= Muhammad Shafi Daudi =

Indian scholar and politician

Member of the Central Legislative Assembly
- In office 1924–1935

Personal details
- Born: 27 October 1875 Daudnagar, India
- Died: 25 January 1949 (aged 73) Daudnagar, India
- Party: Indian National Congress (1920-1928); Swaraj Party (1923-1935); All-India Muslim Conference (1928-1932); All-India Muslim League (1932-1947)
- Education: Darul Uloom Deoband

Muhammad Shafi Daudi (27 October 1875 – 25 January 1949) was an Indian Muslim scholar and a politician, who was a member of the Central Legislative Assembly from 1924 to 1935.

== Early life and education ==
Muhammad Shafi Daudi was born in Daudnagar village of Bihar in 25 October 1875 to Sheikh Mohammad Hasan. He studied in various Madrassa including Darul Uloom Deoband.

== Personal life ==
Muhammad Shadi Daudi was married to Zubaida Daudi, a woman freedom fighter who joined Non-cooperation movement. They had 9 children together.

== Career ==
Daudi joined Indian National Congress in 1920 and also joined Swaraj Party in 1923.

Muzaffarpur district had become an important centre of the Non-Cooperation Movement. The colonial authorities decided to suppress the movement. On 30 October 1921 the Superintendent of Police entered in his diary that the people of Muzaffarpur have great trust in their leader Daudi. The same day the police raided Daudi’s house and arrested along with him Maghfoor Ahmad Ajazi and Abdul Wadood.

He became President of Swaraj Party for Bihar. He participated in the 1923 Indian general election and was elected to the Central Legislative Assembly. He was its member from 1924 to 1935.

In 1928, when Nehru Report on constitutional reforms was adopted by the Indian National Congress. He vehemently opposed the report regarding it failed to provide rights to the minorities.

After the adaption of Nehru Report, He resigned from Indian National Congress along with other Muslim Leaders and founded the All India Muslim Conference on 31 October 1928 at Delhi. His party drafted a resolution which demanded a Federal System of Government with autonomy and residuary powers for the provinces and separate electorate for Muslims. This demand was later adapted by Muhammad Ali Jinnah in his Fourteen points.

He became the General Secretary of All India Muslim Conference in 1930.

In 1932, he merged his All India Muslim Conference with All India Muslim League. he was nominated as one of the permanent vice presidents of Muslim League along with Muhammad Iqbal and Shafaat Ahmed Khan by Aga Khan III on 15 February 1934.

In 1935, when Swaraj Party merged into Indian National Congress he did not join the Congress.

He also participated in 1937 Indian provincial election on the ticket of Majlis-e-Ahrar-ul-Islam.

== Death and legacy ==
He died on 25 January 1949 at his hometown Daudnagar.

A Statue was set up in memory of Shafi Daudi at the Tilak Maidan in Muzaffarpur, Bihar by All India Freedom Fighters Federation.
