= Maghfoor Ahmad Ajazi =

Indian freedom fighter (1900–1966)

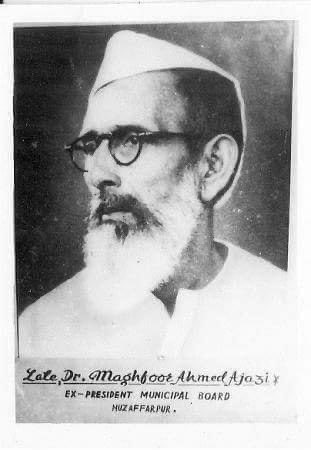
- Maghfoor Ahmad Ajazi
- Born: 3 March 1900; Muzaffarpur, British India
- Died: 26 September 1966 (aged 66); Muzaffarpur, India
- Occupations: Political Activist; freedom fighter; Urdu Poet
- Known for: Founder of All-India Jamhur Muslim League & Flag bearer for the cause of Urdu Language
- Movement: Indian independence movement

Signature
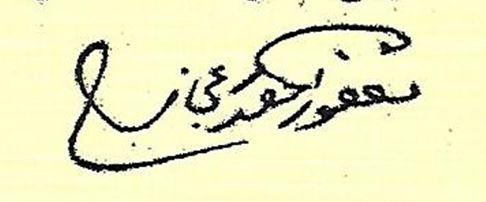

Maghfoor Ahmad Ajazi (3 March 1900 – 26 September 1966) was an Indian political activist and statesman, and prominent figure in the Indian independence movement.

== Early life ==
Ajazi was born on 3 March 1900 in village Dihuli, Block Sakra of District Muzaffarpur, in British India. His father Maulana Hafizuddin Husain and grandfather Imam Bakhsh were zamindars and his mother's name was Mahfoozunnisa. His maternal grandfather Reysat Husain was an advocate in Sitamarhi.

He through Ajaz Husain Budayuni, the Khalif of Fazle Rahman Ganj Muradabadi, acquire title of 'Ajazi'. He gained his patriotism from his father Hafizuddin who had organized the peasantry against the European indigo planters.

Ajazi's mother died in his childhood, while his father died in Lucknow during treatment and was buried in Chaar Bagh Qabristan when Ajazi was in school. His elder brother Manzoor Ahsan Ajazi was also a freedom fighter. He had only one sister, Noorun Nisa.

Ajazi received his elementary and religious education from Madrasa-e-Imdadia, Darbhanga and then joined North Brooke Zila School, Darbhanga, from where he was expelled for opposing the Rowlatt Act. He passed the matriculation examination from Pusa High School and took admission in B.N. College, Patna, for higher studies. He was married to Azizul Fatima. After nikah, marriage ceremony which was attended by Shafi Daudi, Binda babu (later on Speaker, Bihar Assembly) and Deep babu (later on cabinet minister, Bihar), was completely transformed into a public meeting for freedom struggle where slogans against British rule in India and pro-freedom slogans were raised.

== Pre-Independence activism ==
Ajazi left his studies at Bihar National College to follow Mahatma Gandhi and joined the Non-cooperation movement in 1921.

He collected funds for freedom struggle through ‘Muthia’ drive. ‘Muthia’ meant to take out a muththi or fist of grain before preparing every meal to fund freedom struggle. Once he unknowingly reached the house of his cousin in a remote village. He inquired about 'Muthia'. He received a negative answer. His cousin recognised him and requested him to take meal, but he refused even a glass of water. When his sister promised to take out muthia and donated the dues, he agreed to take meal.

He attended the AICC session held at Ahmedabad in 1921 and supported Hasrat Mohani's motion on 'Complete Independence', which was opposed by Mahatma Gandhi and failed. "The Hindu", English Daily in its article published on 2 March 2022 entitled "Colonial's Rule's Impact :Wipe Out British Raj's Ethos" says "Sri Aurbindo advocating for Poorna Swaraj in 1907, going against the proposal of colonial Self-Government given by Dadabhai Naoroji. Hasrat Mohani, Bal Gangadhar Tilak, Maghfoor Ahmad Ajazi, and Bipin Chandra Pal reinforced this call for Complete Independence" He met Gandhiji at Sabarmati Ashram. Ajazi was not in support of the dominion status for India as many people in the Congress wanted at that time. He was always of the opinion that India should not remain under British imperialism for any significant amount of time and that the Raj had no moral right to subjugate Indians. This was the reason that he went against many Congress leaders of his time who were contented with dominion status and he instead wholeheartedly supported the motion of Complete Independence for India.

Ajazi launched a Seven Point Programme to raise funds for the Congress and Khilafat Committees of Muzaffarpur which helped in purchasing land for the District Congress which is now known as Tilak Maidan, Muzaffarpur. Some of the features of his mobilization schemes included selling khadi clothes, burning foreign clothes, boycotting other foreign goods, procuring handful of grains from households and collecting funds for the freedom movement. In one such public meeting at his ancestral village, Dihuli, he burnt a bonfire of his own western clothes. By the end of October 1921, Muzaffarpur district had become an important centre of the Non-cooperation movement. The colonial authorities decided to suppress the movement. So, the police raided Daudi’s house and Ajazi, Daudi and Abdul Wadood were among the leaders arrested and put behind bars. In the Gaya Congress session of 1922, Ajazi met C. R. Das and made fervent electoral campaigns for the Congress candidates in the municipal polls. In 1923, a special session of the Congress took place in Delhi presided over by Abul Kalam Azad. During this session, an issue of sitting arrangement came up whereby the delegates from Bihar were not given seats in the front row. Ajazi registered his strong objection to this discriminatory arrangement after which Bihari delegates were also given appropriate seats. His protest was admittedly on the issue of self-respect of the Biharis and due to his attitude of not accepting any discrimination among people based on their faith, caste or place of origin.

He represented the Central Khilafat Committee at the All Parties Conference and All Muslim Parties Conferences on Nehru Report along with Shaukat Ali, Begum Md. Ali, Abdul Majid Daryabadi, Azad Subhani, Abul Muhasin Muhammad Sajjad and others. On the direction of Md Ali Jauhar, he took charge of the Khilafat Committee Calcutta. He was arrested while participating in a protest march led by Subash Chandra Bose. Later, he was released. He led the demonstrations against Simon Commission at Patna in 1928. He along with Rajendra Prasad worked extensively in relief operations during the 1934 Nepal–India earthquake which was one of the worst earthquakes in India's history. He operated several relief camps providing the affected people with food and shelter. In 1941 he joined the Individual Civil Disobedience and started mobilizing people. During one such mobilization in Muzaffarpur while he was leading a peaceful protest, the local police resorted to lathi charge because of which Ajazi and his followers suffered serious injuries. Despite the death of his eldest son on 25 July 1942, he took part in the Quit India movement and attended the AICC session held at Bombay on 8 August 1942 where he played an important role in adoption of resolution demanding complete independence from the British government. Due to his active involvement in the movement, arrest warrant was issued in his name. A search operation was undertaken at his house. This pushed him to work secretly. Finally, he was arrested and put behind bars along with other national leaders by the British authorities in order to quell the movement.

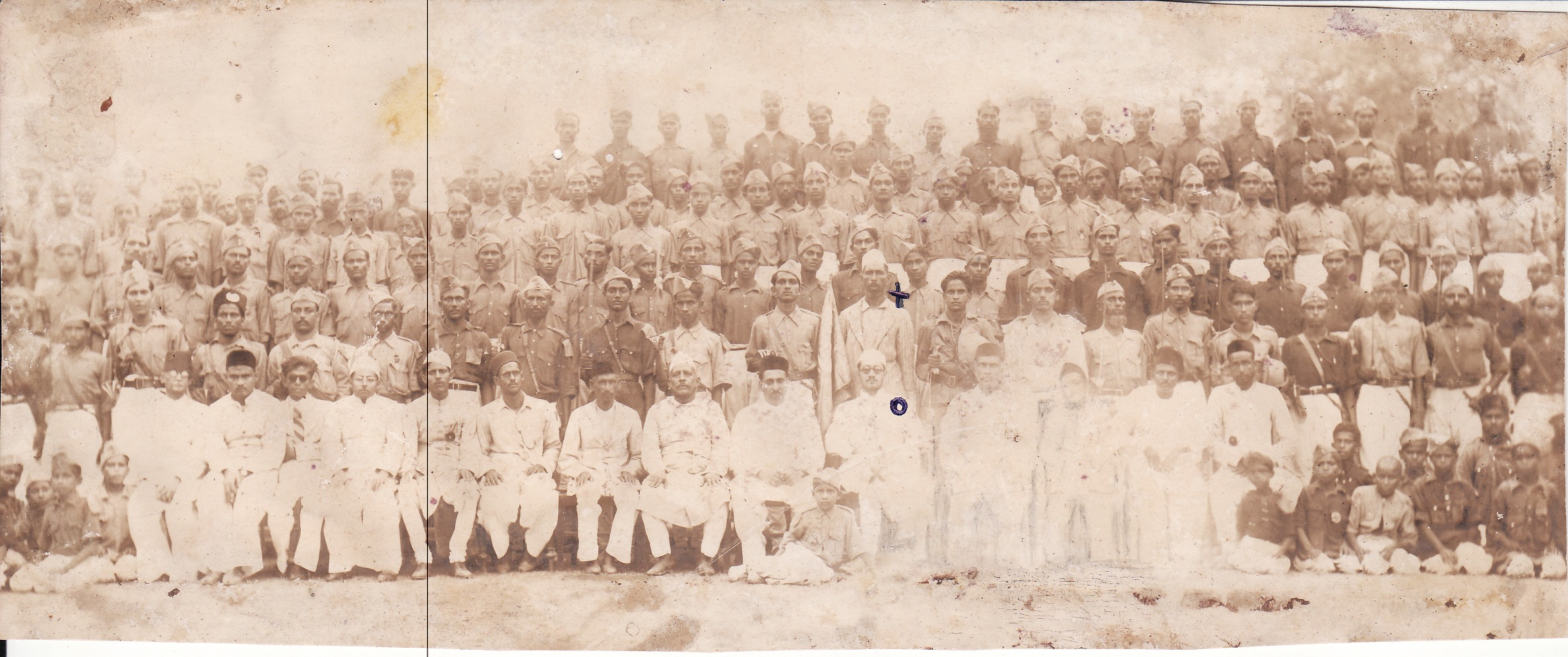
First Session of All India Jamhur Muslim League, which was established by Maghfoor Ahmad Ajazi to support a united India (1940).

Ajazi opposed Muhammad Ali Jinah and opposed the creation of Pakistan. He founded the All-India Jamhur Muslim League in 1940 to counter Jinnah's pro-separatist All-India Muslim League, and served as its first general secretary. Members from the All India Muslim League used to come in batches to his residence to harass him by spitting and screaming. He asserted his politics against the divisive politics of 1940s. He didn't give in despite increasing communalization of Indian landscape in the run up to the independence and remained firm in his belief that Muslims and Hindus can take the nation forward through co-operation and working together for the common good.

Ajazi was also a poet and writer in the Urdu language as well as an orator. His papers, diaries, letters and files are preserved in the Nehru Memorial Museum & Library in New Delhi, National Archives in New Delhi and the Khuda Bakhsh Oriental Public Library in Patna. Govt. of India has decorated his photograph in Azadi Ke Deewane Museum of Lal Qila, Delhi with caption "Opposed Jinnah's Two Nation Theory and founded All India Jamhur Muslim League to counter it".

== Post-independence activism ==
He was the chairman of the Urdu Conference of Muzaffarpur held in 1960, in which for the first time a resolution was passed demanding that Urdu be accepted as an official language in Bihar.

Ajazi established Anjuman Khuddam-e-Millat, based on the pattern of Sir Syed's Educational society. This society established a school, renovated the Company Bagh Mosque of Muzaffarpur, now the biggest Mosque of this city, built a rest house, and undertook the last rites of unclaimed dead bodies.

== Death ==
Ajazi died on 26 September 1966 in Muzaffarpur at his own residence Ajazi House. Thousands of people attended his Namaz-e-Janaza(funeral) which was performed at historic Tilak Maidan, the land bought by the donations made by Ajazi himself and now serves as the headquarters of District Congress Committee. It was the largest gathering ever for a funeral procession in the city's history. He was buried in Qazi Mohammadpur Qabristan.

President Fakhruddin Ali Ahmed recalled his services during Freedom Struggle saying as "He was in forefront of India's War for Independence. The story of his life is a unique and interesting story of an important era of the country". Acharya J.B. Kripalani said: "Dr. Ajazi was a great patriot, a devoted servant of humanity and a lovable friend. Selfless patriot like him are becoming rare. His death is a loss to society". Author Kalam Haidry and novelist and journalist Moin Shahid called him "Baba-e-Urdu, Bihar" (Father of Urdu in BIhar) for his services towards Urdu language. Journalist and poet Wafa Malikpuri described him an old 'Mujahid' (crusader) for Urdu language. Muzaffarpur Municipal Board named the road leading to his residence as "Dr. Ajazi Marg".

== Tributes by Govt. of India ==
- Govt. of India has recognised him as one of the Unsung Heroes of Indian Freedom Struggle on the eve of Amrit Mahotsav of Independence. Azadi Ka Amrit Mahotsav is an initiative of the Government of India to celebrate and commemorate 75 years of India's independence and the glorious history of its people, culture and achievements.
- Embassy of India in Greece pays tribute to him as India celebrates 75 years of its Independence.
- Govt. of India has decorated his photograph in Azadi Ke Diwane Museum of Lal Qila, Delhi with caption "Opposed Jinnah's Two Nation Theory and founded All India Jamhur Muslim League to counter it". The Azadi Ke Diwane museum in the Red Fort complex is dedicated to the unsung heroes who sacrificed their lives and fought for India's freedom. It is a one-of-a-kind museum which aims to inspire younger generations, inform them about the cost of freedom and make them aware that they should not take independence for granted as great freedom fighters achieved it by sacrificing their lives. The museum was built by the Archaeological Survey of India (ASI), with the multi-sensory experiences (to engage visitors) co-created by Tagbin. It is housed in a double-storey building and is divided into 22 zones, arranged in chronological order from 1857 to 1947 paying homage to those who gifted Indians with an independent nation.
