= All Parties Conference =

Group drafting the 1928 Indian constitution

The All Parties Conference was a formal grouping of all Indian political parties for organizing a committee in opposition to the Simon Commission to author the Constitution of India after independence was actualized. It was organised by the Indian National Congress in response to the racist anti-Indian speech made Secretary of State for India, Lord Birkenhead in the British House of Commons, where he had mocked the ability of Indians of self-governance. It was formally called upon by Dr. M. A. Ansari.

Parties that were invited were

1. Indian National Congress
2. All India Muslim League
3. Central Khilafat Committee
4. Akhil Bharatiya Hindu Mahasabha
5. Nationalist Party (led by Hari Singh Gour)
6. National Liberal Federation and its offshoot South Indian Liberal Federation
7. Non-Brahman Party and its offshoot Nationalist Non-Brahman Party (led by Bhaskarrao Jadhav)
8. Home Rule League (led by Annie Besant)
9. Central Sikh League
10. All India Conference of Indian Christians
11. Parsi Central Association, Zoroastrian Association, Parsi Rajakeya Sabha and Bombay Parsi Panchayat (representing Parsis)
12. Republican League
13. Independent Party
14. All India Anglo-Indian Association (representing Anglo-Indians)
15. Indian States Subjects' Association, Indian States Subjects' Conference and Indian States People's Conference (representing Princely States)
16. General Council of Burmese Associations (representing British Burma)
17. Communist Party of India, All India Trade Union Congress and Workers and Peasants Party (representing communists)

In addition to political parties, invitations were also sent to other organisations like the Indian Association, South Indian Chamber of Commerce and Landholders Associations of Madras, Bengal, Bihar and United Provinces.

The All Parties Conference met for the first time in February 1928 at Delhi and set up a committee to discuss the drafting of the constitution, consisting of:

- Motilal Nehru (representing the Indian National Congress & acting as Chairman of the committee)
- Sir Syed Ali Imam & Shuaib Qureshi (representing Muslims)
- Madhav Shrihari Aney & M. R. Jayakar (representing Hindus)
- G. R. Pradhan (representing the non-Brahmans)
- Sardar Mangal Singh (representing Sikhs)
- Sir Tej Bahadur Sapru (representing the National Liberal Federation)
- N. M. Joshi (representing communists)
- Jawaharlal Nehru (acting as Secretary)

However, the committee soon faced a major disagreement between the Congress, Hindu Mahasabha, Muslim League and Sikh League over the issue of reservation of seats on the basis of religion that had been created by the Government of India Act 1909 and Government of India Act 1919 - the Congress was outright opposed to it while the Muslim League was adamant in its demand for one-third representation in the Central Legislative Assembly and reservation of seats for Muslims in Hindu majority provinces as well as in the Muslim majority provinces of Bengal and Punjab, which was vehemently opposed by the Hindu Mahasabha and Sikhs. In addition to opposition to reservation for Muslims in Bengal and Punjab, the Hindu Mahasabha also opposed the Muslim League's demands of provincial autonomy for the Muslim majority Sind division from the Hindu majority Bombay Presidency and creation of new provinces out of the Muslim majority NWFP and Baluchistan. To resolve the disputes, two more committees were set up at its second session in March 1928 at Delhi. Jayakar and Joshi refused to participate in the committee. Nevertheless, the committee did start its work, taking in inputs from Madanmohan Malaviya, C. Y. Chintamani, Sacchidananda Sinha, Ishwar Saran, M. A. Ansari, Saifuddin Kitchlew, Tassaduq Ahmed Sherwani, Syed Mahmud and Chaudhury Khaliquzzaman. In its third session at Lucknow in August 1928, the committee presented its draft constitution, known as the Nehru Report. The Nehru report rejected reservation on the basis of religion, by refusing to acknowledge the deterioration of relations between Hindus and Muslims over issues like the Hindi-Urdu controversy, Malabar uprising, Rangila Rasul controversy, cow protection movement of the Arya Samaj (see Cattle slaughter in India) and the 1926 murder of Swami Shraddhanand and calling out the paranoia propagated by the Muslim League and the Hindu Mahasabha about the other side's aims of state capture as baseless. The Muslim League, stung by the Congress's rejection of separate electorates for Muslims (which the Congress had previously agreed to in the 1916 Lucknow Pact), widely denounced the Nehru Report, with non-Congress Muslim representatives refusing to sign in it. Still in its final session in December 1928 at Calcutta, the All Parties Conference formally adopted the Nehru Report, in response of which the indignant Muslim League representatives staged a walkout. Muhammad Ali Jinnah declared this as the 'parting of ways', yet kept the doors open for negotiation through his 14 Points, which was opposed by the Congress and the Hindu Mahasabha.

The sidelining of the Muslim League in the All Parties Conference had profound implications for the League in general. Jinnah, who had previously championed Hindu-Muslim unity (thereby dividing the party into factions loyal to him and Mian Muhammad Shafi), now turned towards Muslim nationalism.

The All Parties Conference would be the last such attempt by the Congress to work alongside other political players of the country on equal footing, as the Congress started to adopt a more confrontational and belligerent stance towards the British administration following the rejection of the Nehru Report in the Imperial Legislative Council, beginning with the election of Nehru as its president and adoption of Purna Swaraj in its 1929 Lahore session. The other parties in the Conference were opposed to this outright declaration of independence, instead opting for achievement of dominion status espoused in the Balfour Declaration, which the Congress had initially agreed upon by omitting all references to secessionism in the Nehru Report, much to the opposition of the growing socialist faction within the Congress party, which under the leadership of Subhash Chandra Bose, set up the Indian Independence League. The widespread intercommunal solidarity that had been generated by the All Parties Conference did not last after the civil disobedience movement. In 1931, while attending the 2nd Round Table Conference, Gandhi, in his capacity as the lone Congress representative, while vociferously opposing any sort of affirmative action (as laid down in the Nehru Report), claimed the Congress to be the sole representative of all Indians irrespective of caste, religion, class, community and interests and disparagingly referred to delegates of all other Indian political parties present there as ''being not the chosen ones of the nation but chosen ones of the government", which a drew on-spot a sharp condemnation from all non-Hindu and Dalit leaders, especially Dr. B. R. Ambedkar. Congress's foray into nationwide electoral politics in 1934 and 1937 solidified its alienation from all other parties.
