= All India States Peoples Conference =

Political movements in the British Raj

The All India States Peoples Conference (AISPC) (Note: The official name appears to be All-India States' People's Conference. Several variations are however seen in the literature: the hyphen in All-India may be omitted; the apostrophe at the end of States' might be omitted, and People's might be written as Peoples'. Another variation is to shorten States to State.) was a conglomeration of political movements in the princely states of the British Raj, which were variously called Praja Mandals or Lok Parishads. The first session of the organisation was held in Bombay in December 1927. The Conference looked to the Indian National Congress for support, but Congress was reluctant to provide it until 1939, when Jawaharlal Nehru became its president, serving in this position till 1946. After the Indian Independence, however, the Congress distanced itself from the movement, allying itself with the princely rulers via its national government's accession relationships.

The States Peoples' Conference dissolved itself on 25 April 1948 and all its constituent units merged into the Congress, with one exception, viz., the Jammu & Kashmir National Conference. This body, under the leadership of Sheikh Abdullah remained independent, while one section of it merged with the Congress in 1965.

== Organisation ==
The Conference brought together representatives from hundreds of Indian princely states, including Baroda, Bhopal, Travancore and Hyderabad. It was established to encourage political dialogue between the princely class of India, and the British Raj, upon the issues of governance, political stability and future of India.

For a long period, the Conference was hostile to the Indian independence movement, and acted often to condemn and counter-act the work of the Indian National Congress when it was banned by British authorities.,

In 1928, as a part of the All Parties Conference, the All India States Peoples' Conference met in Lucknow with other Indian political organisations to draft the Nehru Report, which was an early version of the Constitution of India.

== Democratisation ==
The body had no popular representation until the 1930s, when it opened up its ranks to membership from across the political spectrum.

Jawaharlal Nehru, who would become the first Prime Minister of India in 1947, was invited to become the President of the All-India body in 1935, became the President in 1939 and remained so until 1946.

== Indian integration ==
The body would play an important role during the political integration of India, helping Indian leaders Vallabhbhai Patel and Jawaharlal Nehru negotiate with hundreds of princes over the formation of a united, independent India after 1947.

== See also ==
- History of the Republic of India
- British Raj
- Indian independence movement

== Bibliography ==
- Chandra, Bipan (2000), India's Struggle for Independence, Penguin Books Limited, ISBN 978-81-8475-183-3
- Ramusack, Barbara N. (1988), "Congress and the People's Movement in Princely India: Ambivalence in Strategy and Organization", in Richard Sisson; Stanley Wolpert (eds.), Congress and Indian Nationalism: The Pre-independence Phase, University of California Press, pp. 377–404, ISBN 978-0-520-06041-8
- Chowdhary, Rekha (2015), Jammu and Kashmir: Politics of Identity and Separatism, Routledge, ISBN 978-1-317-41405-6
- McLeod, John (1999), Sovereignty, Power, Control: Politics in the States of Western India, 1916-1947, BRILL, ISBN 90-04-11343-6
- Sisson, Richard (1988), Congress and Indian Nationalism: The Pre-independence Phase, University of California Press, ISBN 978-0-520-06041-8
- Presidential Address, All-India States' Peoples' Conference, February 1939, Ludhiana
