= Delhi Statement =

1929 statement by Gandhi

The Delhi Statement was issued by Gandhi on 2 November 1929. It was issued when Simon Commission was touring India.

The Congress was passing through a phase of political inactivity. The Swarajists had joined the Legislative Council but did not achieve much. Gandhi was engaged in village upliftment programme. During the Madras Session in December 1927, young leaders like Jawahar Lal Nehru had proposed the resolution for complete independence which was however defeated and the action of Jawahar Lal was not appreciated by Gandhi. With such a background, Simon Commission was receiving strong protest from nationalist supporters. Irwin persuaded the Congress leadership to come to the Round Table Conference which Simon Commission was expected to propose after going back to London. Irwin, the Viceroy of India, had watched with great concern the unanimity of Indians in opposing the Simon Commission. There was opposition in London also against giving concessions to the Indians and it was debated in the Parliament. With this background, Gandhi issued the statement. It was, in a way, an attempt to find a middle path. In the statement, it was suggested, that in the coming Round Table Conference, the features of Dominion Status to India would be discussed, that there would be majority of Congress delegates in the Conference and there would be issues of general amnesty and conciliation. In this way, there were four main demands for the Commission.

Gandhi met Irwin on 23 November 1929 where Irwin, the Viceroy, rejected the offer given in Delhi Statement. In the meantime, Lala Lajpat Rai died because of Lathi Charge on 17 November 1928. Later, when Gandhi signed the Gandhi Irwin pact, all the four demands were avoided at that time. Under the pact, Gandhi had accepted to participate in the second Round Table Conference after holding back the Civil Disobedience Movement. It was read as a compromise by the supporters of Nationalist and especially by the Indian Capitalists who had started showing sign of fatigue during the Civil Disobedience Movement. It is considered as the cause of later withdrawal of Civil Disobedience Movement, which was finally withdrawn in April 1934.
