= Shuaib Qureshi =

Pakistani diplomat, politician and journalist

Minister for Information and Broadcasting
- In office 18 April 1953 – 30 May 1954
- Prime Minister: Mohammad Ali Bogra

Ambassador of Pakistan to the Soviet Union
- In office 1949–1953

Ambassador of Pakistan to Iraq
- In office 1955–1959

Personal details
- Born: 1892
- Died: 1962 (aged 69–70)

Shuaib Qureshi (1892–1962) was a Pakistani diplomat, politician, journalist and lawyer. He served as Pakistan's first ambassador to the Soviet Union, later joined the federal cabinet of Prime Minister Mohammad Ali Bogra as minister for information and broadcasting, and subsequently served as Pakistan's envoy to Iraq.

== Early life ==
Qureshi was born in 1892 and was trained as a lawyer. Before the creation of Pakistan, he was active in politics and journalism in British India. He was a member of the Indian medical mission to Turkey during the Balkan War of 1912–13, served as general secretary of the All India Congress Committee from 1924 to 1928, and was a member of the All Parties Conference Committee that produced the Nehru Report. He later served in the Bhopal State service from 1929 to 1948 and edited the newspapers Young India, Independent, Muslim Outlook and New Era.

== Career ==
After the creation of Pakistan, Qureshi entered the diplomatic service. In October 1949, he was appointed Pakistan's first ambassador to the Soviet Union. He served in Moscow from 1949 to 1953 and was later posted to India in 1953.

On 18 April 1953, Qureshi was inducted into the federal cabinet of Prime Minister Mohammad Ali Bogra as minister for information and broadcasting from 18 April 1953 to 30 May 1954, and later held the portfolios of refugees and rehabilitation and Kashmir affairs.

After leaving the cabinet, he returned to diplomacy. He served as Pakistan's envoy to Iraq from 1955 to 1959.
