= Political career of Rab Butler (1929–1941) =

The Right Honourable R. A. Butler MP
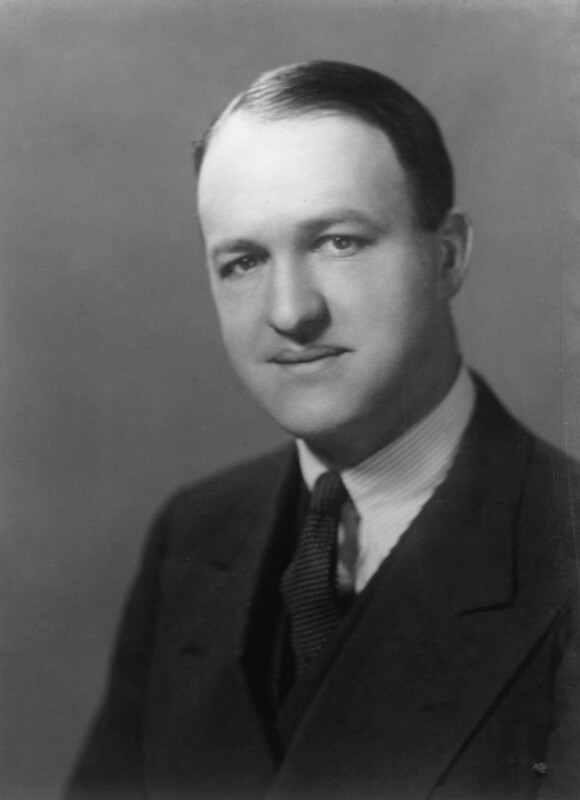
- 1934 photograph of Butler
- Born: Richard Austen Butler; 9 December 1902; Attock Serai, British India (now Attock, Pakistan)
- Died: 8 March 1982 (aged 79); Great Yeldham, Essex, England
- Resting place: St Mary the Virgin, Saffron Walden
- Other name: Rab
- Education: Pembroke College, Cambridge
- Political party: Conservative
- Spouse: Sydney Elizabeth Courtauld (m. 1926; died 1954)
- Children: 3
- Parent: Montagu Sherard Dawes Butler (father)

Member of Parliament for Saffron Walden
- In office 30 May 1929 – 19 February 1965
- Preceded by: William Mitchell
- Succeeded by: Peter Kirk
Ministerial offices
Under Secretary of State for Foreign Affairs
In office 25 February 1938 – 20 July 1941 Serving with The Earl of Plymouth (1938–1940)
Prime Minister	Neville Chamberlain; Winston Churchill
Sec. of State	The Viscount Halifax; Anthony Eden
Preceded by	The Viscount Cranborne
Succeeded by	Richard Law
Parliamentary Secretary to the Ministry of Labour
In office 28 May 1937 – 25 February 1938
Prime Minister	Neville Chamberlain
Minister	Ernest Brown
Preceded by	Anthony Muirhead
Succeeded by	Alan Lennox-Boyd
Under Secretary of State for India
In office 29 September 1932 – 28 May 1937
Prime Minister	Ramsay MacDonald; Stanley Baldwin
Sec. of State	Sir Samuel Hoare; The Marquess of Zetland
Preceded by	The Marquess of Lothian
Succeeded by	The Lord Stanley

Richard Austen Butler (9 December 1902 – 8 March 1982), generally known as R. A. Butler and familiarly known from his initials as Rab, was a prominent British Conservative Party politician.

Butler was elected to Parliament for Saffron Walden in Essex at the 1929 general election and soon became a parliamentary assistant to Samuel Hoare, the leading Conservative politician associated with Indian policy. Butler attended the Second Round Table Conference, and in early 1932, he visited India on Lord Lothian's Franchise Committee, which recommended an increase in the Indian franchise. Butler became the youngest member of the government, at 29, in September 1932, when he was appointed Under-Secretary for India. In that position, he helped to steer the Government of India Act 1935, which granted provincial self-government to India through the Commons in the teeth of strong opposition from Winston Churchill, who spoke for much of the rank-and-file Conservative opinion in the country.

Between May 1937 and February 1938, Butler served as Parliamentary Secretary to the Ministry of Labour. In February 1938, Butler was moved to be Under-Secretary of Foreign Affairs, serving under Foreign Secretary Lord Halifax and Prime Minister Neville Chamberlain. Butler, who was often the main government foreign affairs spokesman in the Commons, was a strong supporter of the appeasement of Nazi Germany and supported Chamberlain's efforts to negotiate with Adolf Hitler in September 1938, which culminated in the Munich Agreement. After Hitler broke the agreement by occupying Prague in March 1939, Butler continued urging rapprochement with Germany and, up to the very outbreak of war, opposing Britain going to war for the sake of Poland. After the outbreak of war, he continued to hanker towards a compromise peace, and in June 1940 he had a mysterious meeting with the Swedish trade envoy Björn Prytz at which he declared that British attitudes to peace would be based on "common sense, not bravado". Thereafter, he retained his position at the Foreign Office until July 1941 but appears to have been kept away from serious decision-making.

Butler's later claims in his memoirs (1971) that he had supported appeasement merely to gain time for British re-armament are not supported by contemporary evidence. Although Butler went on to hold many senior Cabinet offices, his reputation as an appeaser dogged him later in his career and would be one of the factors that cost him the party leadership in 1957 and 1963.

== Backbench MP ==
Butler was elected Member of Parliament (MP) for Saffron Walden in the 1929 general election and held the seat until his retirement in 1965. His father advised him that he lacked facility for executive decision making and that he should aim to become Speaker. He also warned him in 1926 not to acquire a reputation as a bore by specialising in Indian affairs in Parliament. He then advised him in 1929 that he should either devote his life to India as he himself had done or aim to come out later as a provincial governor or even as Viceroy.

Before being elected to Parliament he became private secretary to Samuel Hoare. Butler was one of a number of young MPs who had a sharp exchange of letters in The Times (27–28 May 1930) with Harold Macmillan, who was then out of Parliament, over the Mosley Memorandum. Macmillan had suggested that the "game" of politics was "hardly worth bothering to play at all" if governments were not willing to adopt radical solutions to reduce unemployment. Butler replied that if that was his view he should seek a "pastime more suited to his talents". Butler recorded that the whips had "chuckled" at the letter, but it may have contributed the enmity that Macmillan, who would be a backbench rebel in the 1930s, when Butler was a rising ministerial star, felt towards him in later years.

In 1930, Butler referred to the rebels against Stanley Baldwin's leadership, led by the Press Barons Lords Rothermere and Beaverbrook, as the "Forty Thieves". He wrote of "Brigadier-General this and Colonel that" amongst Conservative backbenchers and thought Beaverbrook to be "green and apeish". (Note: Beaverbrook, a short man with relatively long arms and faintly simian appearance, was often likened to a chimpanzee by contemporaries.) Butler supported Duff Cooper in the Westminster St George's by-election in March 1931.

== India Office Minister ==
=== Parliamentary Private Secretary and appointment as junior minister ===
In August 1931, when the National Government was formed, Butler was appointed Parliamentary Private Secretary (PPS) to India Secretary Samuel Hoare. The India Committee, one of whose leading lights was Winston Churchill, had been formed to resist plans for greater Indian self-government after the Gandhi–Irwin Pact. (Note: Butler's father did not approve of Lord Irwin, as the future Foreign Secretary Lord Halifax was then known. The Irwin Declaration had been on 31 October 1929. Indians had been excluded from the Simon Commission, but Lord Irwin wanted them to be involved in the constitutional talks. The First Round Table Conference was in November 1930. Churchill resigned from the Conservative Shadow Cabinet in protest in February 1931, with negotiations with Gandhi in progress. The Gandhi–Irwin Pact announced the release of Indian prisoners and that the Indian National Congress would be invited to participate in the Second Round Table Conference. Lord Willingdon, the new Viceroy from April 1931, was much less sympathetic to Gandhi than Irwin had been (Jago 2015, p.65-7, 70).) Butler's wife, Sydney had written to his mother that she would "pray for snow and sleet" if Mahatma Gandhi visited London in his loincloth. As PPS, Butler was Hoare's eyes and ears at the Second Round Table Conference then in progress and was soon impressed by Gandhi. He was sent to India on Lord Lothian's Franchise Committee, one of three committees that were set up as part of the Round Table Conference. He left in January 1932 and returned on 21 May. The Committee recommended an increase in the Indian electorate from 7 million to 36 million.

Butler returned to find himself now a joint PPS with Micky Knatchbull, MP for Ashford in Kent. Butler soon re-established himself as Hoare's main adviser and persuaded him to attend the Conservative Conference at Blackpool that October at which Churchill was planning to move a motion that was critical of the government's Indian policy. He was given his first ministerial job as Under-Secretary of State for India (29 September 1932) when Lord Lothian resigned, along with the rest of Herbert Samuel's Official Liberals, over the National Government's abandonment of free trade. At 29, Butler was the youngest member of the government.

=== White paper and Joint Select Committee ===
The government published a white paper in March 1933 that contained proposals for Indian Home Rule. At the end of March, Butler had to open for the government on the last day of the debate on the proposals. He called for a Joint Select Committee of Both Houses to examine the recent White Paper and make proposals for a bill. Expecting a fierce response from Churchill, he compared himself (29 March) to "a bullock calf tied to a tree, awaiting the arrival of the Lord of the Forest" and added that the tiger would be shot by riflemen when tempted out. (Note: Butler's sister rebuked him for the metaphor by pointing out that for religious reasons, Indians were more likely to employ a goat for that purpose.)

One of Butler's jobs was to monitor opinion in the Parliamentary Party. In April 1933, he drew up a White List of 47 Conservative MPs who openly supported the White Paper and a Black List of 103 MPs, not including obvious ones like Churchill, whose names, Conservative Central Office recorded, should not be passed on to constituency associations that asked for a speaker on India.

The Joint Select Committee began in April 1933. The Union of Britain and India (UBI), a front organisation funded by Conservative Central Office, was launched on 20 May 1933. (Note: Graham Stewart (1999, pp.166-8) gives the date as 17 May.) The UBI was dedicated to promoting Indian reform along the lines of the White Paper, albeit with "adequate safeguards". In setting up the UBI, Hoare, Butler and J. C. C. Davidson were in breach of their pledges, as members of the Joint Select Committee, to remain neutral and to consider the evidence without prejudice (Note: It was a "quasi-judicial" committee, in modern parlance.) and so the depth of their involvement therefore had to be covered up. Butler's flat was frequently used for UBI meetings, and he later admitted in his memoirs that it had been difficult to get anybody to join it. In 1933, Butler clashed with his future rival Harold Macmillan, a Conservative backbencher at the time, who refused to publish UBI propaganda from his family publishing house. (Note: UBI Chairman Sir John Thompson was quite explicit that its purpose was to organise meetings in constituencies in which the local Conservatives opposed the bill. This was a breach of the government's ban on partisan campaigning. The Diehards, who opposed reform, on the Joint Select Committee by and large respected the gentleman’s agreement to remain neutral. Their Indian Defence League continued to campaign actively in the constituencies but had never agreed to the ban on campaigning. The UBI listed 192 members and supporters. It boasted 27 ex-Indian Governors and Members of Council who had experience of India since the Montagu–Chelmsford Reforms of 1919; the IDL countered in the spring of 1934 by publishing a list of 300 members with Indian experience, 200 of them since 1919. By December 1934, when it began a recruitment drive, the IDL already had between 8,000 and 10,000 members. Of the 20 UBI branches that were eventually set up, half of them in the early part of 1935, none was in the key battleground of Lancashire, where there were concerns that the cotton trade would suffer from a protectionist self-governing India. The UBI Bulletin was little more than a leaflet compared to the 50-page Indian Empire Review.[Stewart 1999, pp.166-8])

Butler was present for Baldwin's speech (28 June 1933) to the Central Council of the National Union of Conservative Associations which urged that India be kept out of party politics, rather than become the political issue that Ireland had been for previous generations. Butler thought that the presence of Neville Chamberlain at the meeting did more to sway Conservative opinion in Baldwin's favour.

Butler was active speaking in the country in favour of implementing the planned reforms on behalf of the UBI. Butler faced significant opposition from Conservative activists in his constituency, including some who deplored the granting of independence to Ireland over a decade earlier and one woman who thought it wrong to give the vote to Indians as she believed them to be savages who were still fighting with bows and arrows.

The Manchester Chamber of Commerce, representing the Lancashire cotton trade, initially objected to India having the right to impose tariffs on British goods. Churchill accused Hoare of having, with the aid of the Earl of Derby, breached parliamentary privilege by improperly influencing the Manchester Chamber of Commerce to drop its opposition. Butler disapproved of Churchill's actions, writing (19 April 1934) to Lord Brabourne (the former Micky Knatchbull, now Governor of Bombay) after Churchill had made his charges that "Winston developed his case with considerable force" and commenting on his alliance with Lloyd George, Clement Attlee (acting leader of the Labour Party) and Rothermere's Daily Mail which publicised his charges. He added that "The whole episode will certainly make Winston’s name stink more than it does at present with the reputable members of our party. I am inclined to think that it will do Winston down, whatever the effect it has on Sam [Hoare]". He added that Churchill's collusion with opposition leaders "should settle our party’s opinion of him". (Stanley Baldwin (28 April) thought that the episode proved Churchill to be "fundamentally a blackguard" guilty of "the dirtiest business I’ve ever encountered in politics".) (Note: In the event Hoare was completely exonerated by the Committee on Privileges. Churchill gave a powerful speech in the Commons Chamber that attacked the committee's findings. On 13 June 1934, Leo Amery spoke, arguing that Churchill's true aim was to bring down the government under the cover of the doctrine fiat justicia ruat caelum ("may justice be done, though the heavens fall"). Churchill, who was neither a lawyer nor a classicist, growled "translate it!" Amery replied that it meant "If I can trip up Sam, the Government's bust". The ensuing laughter made Churchill look ridiculous.)

By October 1934, Butler's White List had grown to 56 MPs, and his Black List had shrunk to 60. There were also 2 Grey White MPs, 4 White Grey, 36 Grey and 1 Black Grey.

=== Government of India Act ===
After a year and a half, the Joint Select Committee reported in November 1934. A bill was drawn up, which Butler helped to pilot through the House of Commons in the first half of 1935. The bill was immensely long, containing 473 clauses and 16 schedules, and the debates took up 4,000 pages of Hansard. During the passage of the bill, Churchill praised Butler in the House of Commons (5 June 1935) but not Hoare with whom Churchill had clashed badly after Churchill had accused him of interfering with the evidence of the Manchester Chamber of Commerce to the Joint Select Committee. Baldwin replaced Ramsay MacDonald as Prime Minister (7 June 1935) during the third reading of the bill. During the resulting reshuffle, Hoare became Foreign Secretary and was succeeded as India Secretary by Lord Zetland and so Butler had to steer the final stages of the bill through the House of Commons. Lord Dunglass attributed the success of the bill, which became the Government of India Act 1935, to him. The Act received Royal Assent on 2 August 1935.

Butler later regarded the Act as the greatest achievement of his career and argued that it helped to set India on the path of parliamentary democracy. Butler also blamed Muhammad Ali Jinnah, whose strength of character he likened to that of Edward Carson, for the eventual secession of Pakistan and wrote that "men like Jinnah are not born every day". However, he also blamed the Indian National Congress for not doing enough to court the Muslims. In 1954, Butler stayed in Delhi, where Jawaharlal Nehru, who he wrote had mellowed from his extreme positions of the 1930s, told him that the Act, based on the principles of A. V. Dicey and Anson, had been the foundation of the Indian Independence Bill.

=== After the Act ===
Butler continued as Under-Secretary for India for the rest of Baldwin's government (1935–1937). He had a distant relationship with Lord Zetland, who required him to book an appointment in advance if he wanted to see him. In his memoirs, Butler makes no mention of the period except a single paragraph sneering at Zetland, despite the crises in foreign policy (Italian expansion into Abyssinia in late 1935, German remilitarisation of the Rhineland in March 1936 and the outbreak of the Spanish Civil War in June 1936) which took place in this period.

Neville Chamberlain succeeded Baldwin as Prime Minister in May 1937. Butler was Parliamentary Secretary at the Ministry of Labour in the new government until February 1938. He served under Ernest Brown, Minister of Labour, who was also responsible for Regional Development, which gave Butler experience of the human cost of regional unemployment.

== Foreign Office Minister ==
=== February 1938: Appointment ===
In February 1938, Butler was appointed Under-Secretary of State for Foreign Affairs in the reshuffle caused by the resignation of Anthony Eden as Foreign Secretary and Lord Cranborne as Under-Secretary. At an early meeting with a German diplomat on 24 February, shortly before his formal assumption of office, Butler spoke of how little support Eden had enjoyed in the Cabinet, of the recent sidelining of the anti-German foreign office mandarin Robert Vansittart and of how Butler believed that the older generation of French-speaking and pro-French diplomats were now being pushed aside. Although such views were widely held in the upper reaches of the government, Butler's forcefulness in sharing them with the Germans was unusual.

With the new Foreign Secretary, Lord Halifax, in the House of Lords, Butler was the main Foreign Office spokesman in the House of Commons. In practice, the Prime Minister often spoke in the House of Commons on foreign policy, and initially, when Butler spoke on sensitive issues such as the Anschluss of Austria (March 1938) or the ongoing Spanish Civil War, he was greeted with cries of "Where's the Prime Minister? Fetch him in!" Butler's PPS was the diarist "Chips" Channon, who described Butler (28 February 1938) as "a scholarly dry-stick, but an extremely able, cautious, canny man of great ambition" and (12 March 1938) as having "the brains and ability of a super clever civil servant, but completely unprejudiced. He seems to have no bias on any subject and looks on the whole human race as mental".

=== Summer 1938: Czechoslovakia ===
In internal foreign office discussions after the Anschluss, Butler counselled against a British guarantee to go to war to defend Czechoslovakia and approved of the Cabinet decision (22 March) not to give one (he later omitted these facts from his memoirs). Halifax and Butler assisted Chamberlain in drafting his Commons statement for 24 March. Chamberlain did not rule out war altogether but was influenced by advice from the chiefs of staff that Czechoslovakia was indefensible. (Note: Tim Bouverie (1999, pp.195-8) discusses how there was little British appetite for war for the sake of Czechoslovakia, seen as an artificial multinational state created at the Versailles Settlement in 1919 and supposedly impossible for Britain and France to assist. Neither Chamberlain nor Halifax felt at this stage that Hitler had "Napoleonic" ambitions to dominate the continent, but rather that he genuinely wanted to unite all German-speaking people into Germany. Ministerial discussions ruled out any attempt to encircle Germany with alliances with the USSR (whose armed forces had been seen to have been severely weakened by the recent Great Purges) or other countries, or even a renewed commitment to fight alongside France, an ally of Czechoslovakia, but rather decided to urge Prague to seek peaceful compromise with Berlin and with the Sudeten Germans.) Jago argues that Butler helped to tone down Chamberlain's speech to stick to a more logical approach than was usual for Chamberlain and to stress the commitment to peace.

On 22 April Ernst Woermann, First Counsellor at the German Embassy in London, reported a conversation with Butler to Joachim von Ribbentrop, who had recently been promoted from German Ambassador in London to Foreign Minister. Butler stated that despite the Anschluss in March Chamberlain still desired a "real understanding" with Germany. He reported Butler as saying that "the German and British peoples were of the same blood" and that it was "inconceivable that Germany and England should meet again on the battlefield". Butler commented that the two men could not speak freely about Czechoslovakia but added that "England was aware that Germany would attain "her next goal" [i.e. control of the German-speaking Sudetenland] and was only concerned about the manner in which this was done". Tim Bouverie comments that such comments must have served to undermine any credibility in British warnings to Germany not to make aggressive threats against Czechoslovakia. In June 1938, Helmuth Wohlthat, Ministerial Director for the German Four Year Plan, met Butler and reported that he was favourably-disposed to Germany.

Butler spent most of the Sudeten Crisis with Channon at a meeting in Geneva about reform of the Covenant of the League of Nations and strongly approved of Chamberlain's trip to Berchtesgaden (16 September) even if it meant sacrificing Czechoslovakia in the interests of peace. Channon recorded Butler as saying (16 September 1938) that "the man in possession when challenged must inevitably part with something". With Chamberlain having another meeting with Hitler at Godesberg (22–23 September), Halifax instructed Butler (23 September) to find out if the Soviets would fight to defend Czechoslovakia. Hitler presented inflated demands in the Godesberg Memorandum (24 September). Butler had to talk to Maxim Litvinov, Soviet Commissar for Foreign Affairs. He obtained an assurance ("anodyne" in Jago's view) that the Soviets "would take action" and "might desire to raise the matter with the League" if Germany acted without agreement. Lady Diana Cooper encountered Butler at a party one evening in Geneva. He tried to impress a beautiful young Swiss woman by reciting a poem by Alphonse de Lamartine on a balcony, only to turn around and find that she had slipped away.

Butler returned to Britain to make the winding-up speech for the Government in the Parliamentary Debate on the Munich Agreement on 5 October. After Churchill had spoken, Butler said that war solved nothing and that it was better to "settle our differences with Germany by consultation". He implied the government's critics to be insular by mentioning how Chamberlain was praised abroad and at Geneva. However, he did not directly defend the Munich settlement; the motion was to support the avoidance of war and the pursuit of lasting peace. When Duff Cooper resigned in protest, Butler wrote (12 October) of his resignation statement in the House of Commons that "Duff's veins stood out and he was very rude".

=== Autumn 1938 to spring 1939: from Munich to Prague ===
One of Butler's constituents in Saffron Walden was the businessman Ernest Tennant. A leading member of the Anglo-German Fellowship, he pushed for Anglo-German friendship until he became convinced of Hitler's malignant intentions in the winter of 1938–1939. On 30 November, Butler gave a speech to a group of politicians and business leaders called "The Parlour". His surviving notes, discussed with Chamberlain's foreign policy advisor Horace Wilson, indicate that he thought that Hitler would "Bluster West, Infiltrate East". In other words, Butler thought that war involving Britain and France was unlikely but that there would be further changes to Eastern European boundaries, including a very likely German occupation of the rump of Czechoslovakia, Danzig and Memel and the eventual German participation in rule of the former colonies, which had been confiscated after the First World War, but the recent Kristallnacht would make Anglo-German agreement difficult for the time being. Butler approved of Chamberlain's talks with Mussolini and believed that Germany was still economically weak.

Butler was sworn of the Privy Council in the 1939 New Year Honours as the youngest person to join it since Churchill in 1907. Channon found Butler "very sly and subtle" (15 January 1939). David Lloyd George called him "the Artful Dodger" at the time in reference to his refusal to give straight answers about the government's views about Spain, where Francisco Franco's victory was clearly imminent. Lloyd George intended a compliment when he described Butler as "playing the part of the imperturbable dunce who says nothing with an air of conviction". Between the reopening of Parliament on 31 January 1939 and Hitler's seizure of Prague on 15 March, Butler was kept very busy in Parliament, making 544 oral statements, including 35 in two days on 1–2 February 1939) and giving 35 written answers. He wrote during the Palestine Conference (17 February 1939) that he found it "rather peaceful to bathe in these Arab-Jewish difficulties" and that he did not share recent Cabinet concerns that Hitler might bomb Britain or invade the Netherlands.

=== After Prague: Polish guarantee ===
After Hitler occupied Prague (15 March 1939), Butler, like Chamberlain, was shocked at his duplicity in breaking the Munich Agreement. Britain attempted to deter further German aggression by pledging to go to war to defend Poland since Germany was demanding greater control of the Free City of Danzig and the Polish Corridor and other Eastern European countries. This sea change in policy was driven more by Halifax than by Chamberlain, and evidence suggests that Butler did not support it and would have preferred Poland also to be sacrificed in the interests of peace.

Channon recorded (26 March) that the mooted Polish guarantee was unwise as it might "stiffen the resistance" of Poland, as had happened with Czechoslovakia the previous year. This very likely reflects Butler's views, as he wrote that summer that he "never liked the Polish Guarantee. It gave Russia just the excuse not to defend herself against Germany". The guarantee was finally given on 5 April, and that day Channon recorded that Butler was irritated that Halifax had not consulted him over the matter. Butler thought that Benito Mussolini's seizure of Albania in (7–12 April 1939) would destabilise the Balkans. Chamberlain told him not to be so silly and to go home to bed. However, Channon also recorded (13 April) that Halifax was aware that Butler still had the Prime Minister's ear and was still encouraging him to conciliate Hitler.

=== Summer 1939: relations with Germany, Poland and Soviet Union ===
Butler, after a meeting with the Duke of Buccleuch, who had recently accompanied Butler's friend Lord Brocket, another leading member of the Anglo-German Fellowship, to Berlin, vainly urged Halifax to encourage Poland to make concessions to Germany and to push for better Anglo-German trade links. In fact, not even Chamberlain or Wilson favoured British economic assistance for Germany. Butler was also impressed by Hitler's Reichstag speech of 28 April, which appeared to hold out the possibility of a renewed Anglo-German agreement and a settlement of the Danzig issue. By May, Halifax and the Foreign Office were deeply concerned that Chamberlain and Wilson were inclining to appeasement again.

Although not yet a member of the Cabinet, Butler became a member of the foreign policy committee, which from 16 May discussed the possibility of an Anglo-Soviet alliance. The Cabinet decided on such an alliance on 24 May, contrary to Chamberlain's and Butler's wishes, but Butler and Wilson persuaded Chamberlain to hamstring the search for an agreement by including a requirement that Britain would not fight without League of Nations approval. Chamberlain, who was concerned that an Anglo-Soviet alliance might worsen diplomatic relations by dividing Europe into two hostile power blocs, as in the period before 1914, wrote to his sister Hilda (28 May 1939) that Butler was his only supporter over the issue but that he was "not... a very influential ally".

On 13 June Butler wrote directly (i.e. without allowing Foreign Office officials to comment) to Halifax to recommend "forward moves" between Britain and Germany over trade, the restoration of German colonies and a renewed naval agreement, but Halifax was dismissive. Butler had a long talk with the Nazi sympathiser, the Aga Khan (28 June), and sent Halifax a full report although Butler claimed to have supported an Anglo-Soviet agreement to preserve the balance of power. Butler wanted the Aga Khan to visit Berlin, and when Halifax did not approve, Butler lobbied Chamberlain and Wilson, who also did not approve. Butler's friend Lord Brocket opposed the British guarantee to Poland and Romania and appears, to Lord Halifax's irritation, to have given German Foreign Minister Joachim von Ribbentrop the impression in June 1939 that Britain would not fight for Danzig or the Polish Corridor to which he believed Germany to have a good claim. On 17 July, Butler lobbied Halifax for Britain to lean on Poland to reach agreement with Germany and wanted only an "anodyne" agreement with the Soviet Union but a renewed Anglo-German Naval Agreement, to be followed eventually by an agreement over colonies.

=== Late August 1939: Hitler moves on Poland ===
With a German move against Poland looming, Butler returned from holiday in the South of France on 24 August, the day after the Molotov–Ribbentrop Pact. Butler later wrote that he believed that "Germany might have negotiated had we influenced the Poles earlier in the summer" and that he agreed with Carl Jacob Burckhardt, the League of Nations High Commissioner for the Free City of Danzig, that "Polish diplomacy was not clever and that they brought much of the trouble upon their own heads". On 25 August, Butler advised Chamberlain, Halifax, Cadogan (Permanent Under-Secretary at the Foreign Office) and Wilson that signing the Polish Treaty (Agreement of Mutual Assistance) that afternoon "would have a bad psychological effect upon Hitler and would wreck the negotiations". He favoured Hitler's proposal, which was received that day, for Germany to be allowed to settle matters with Poland as it wished and, in return for concessions over her former colonies, for the signing of an Anglo-German alliance guaranteeing German assistance in the defence of the British Empire. Butler's and Wilson's response struck Leslie Hore-Belisha (Secretary of State for War) as "fulsome, obsequious and deferential". In fact, the signature of the Anglo-Polish Alliance on the afternoon of 25 August encouraged Hitler to postpone the invasion, which had been scheduled for 26 August, until 1 September. Oliver Harvey recorded (27 August) that Butler and Horace Wilson were "working like beavers" for "another Munich", but eventually, Cadogan's advice was taken, and the government agreed to honour the guarantee to Poland.

As late as the start of September 1939, with German invasion of Poland imminent, comments in Channon's diary suggest that Butler was sympathetic to last-minute Italian efforts to broker peace and that he and Butler were heartened by a delay in the British declaration of war on Germany. In fact, however, the delay in the issuing of the British ultimatum was caused by the lack of agreement with the French over the timing.

=== Later analysis and Butler's memoirs ===
Butler's close association with appeasement was often held against him later in his career, more so than against Lords Home or Hailsham, his rivals for the party leadership in 1963, who had been more junior. (Note: Home, known at the time as Lord Dunglass, was the Prime Minister's PPS, and Hailsham (Mr. Quintin Hogg as he then was), was elected to Parliament at the famous Oxford by-election soon after Munich.) This did not prevent Butler from holding many further senior ministerial positions, whilst the immediate causes of his failure to achieve the premiership would be in 1957 his open discontent with Eden's leadership in general and with the Suez adventure in particular and his reluctance to pander to the Conservative right and in 1963 his reluctance to cause a political crisis by refusing to serve under Home. Although Churchill valued Butler's abilities as a minister, by the time of Suez, his past, coupled with his lack of personal military experience, damaged his reputation in the eyes of the younger generation of Conservative MPs, many of whom were Second World War veterans. Macmillan, who later recalled Butler as having been "the most cringing of the Munichites", often made sure that point was repeated.

Although at the time Butler strongly supported reaching agreement with Hitler as necessary for peace, in his memoirs (The Art of the Possible, 1971) he made the opposite argument by defending the Munich Agreement as essential to buy time for Britain to rearm and to gain support in Britain and the Dominions and by also claiming that he had little input into the direction of foreign policy. He argued that Dominion support was not forthcoming in 1938, that France might not have stood firm because of domestic troubles, and that the Sudeten Germans could not be denied self-determination. Anthony Howard concedes that Butler was right to argue that public opinion in Britain and the Dominions was more willing to accept war in autumn 1939 than had been the case a year earlier.

The sections on appeasement in Butler's memoirs attracted little attention from reviewers, the exception being Labour Leader Harold Wilson, as Britain's refusal to intervene in the Spanish Civil War on the side of the Republic was still a totemic issue to the Left a generation later. Butler stressed his role in answering Parliamentary questions, travelling to League meetings in Geneva and meeting with foreign diplomats in London (Halifax disliked foreign travel and having dealings with the Soviets and Japanese). Paul Stafford wrote, "The impression that The Art of the Possible creates, that Rab welcomed the drive away from appeasement after [Hitler's breach of the Munich Agreement by occupying] Prague and supported Halifax for leading it, is wholly false". For all their differences, Chamberlain and Halifax had by this time largely come to agree that no agreement with Hitler was worthwhile without at least the threat of war and that a line must be drawn over Danzig.

Butler's own papers suggest that he had gone to "greater lengths to meet Hitler's demands than any other figure in the British government" in 1939. His efforts to revoke the Polish guarantee in the summer of 1939 went beyond even Horace Wilson's, and it seems doubtful that he was willing to fight Hitler over Poland at all. Paul Stafford noted, "Rab's pre-war record at the Foreign Office is not a creditable one. Had the truth about his activities in 1938-9 been clearly appreciated while he was still in politics, the effect on his career would probably have been catastrophic".

Butler tried to prevent the publication of Channon's diaries in the 1960s lest they shed light on his activities in this era. Patrick Cosgrave wrote, "Butler did not merely go along with appeasement, he waxed hard, long and enthusiastic for it, and there is very little evidence in public records at the time that he took the slightest contemporary interest in the rearmament programme to which he devotes such emphasis in his memoirs". Halifax made not one reference to Butler, who was by then a leading member of the government, in his 1957 autobiography, Fullness of Days. Halifax's biographer Andrew Roberts writes: "It is hard to see Butler as a sympathetic figure in the 1930s. He took to appeasement with an unholy glee not shared after the Anschluss by anyone else in the Foreign Office... a thoroughly unattractive figure". Butler's biographer Michael Jago comments that it is "hard to disagree" with Roberts. Over appeasement, Butler "distorted the facts, grossly misrepresenting his responsibility and attitudes in 1938". Although not the direct cause of his leadership defeats in 1957 or 1963 "it was... always there, the blemish that he could not quite reason away".

=== Phoney War ===
At the outbreak of war, Butler hoped to be promoted to Minister for Economic Warfare, a Cabinet-level position. Channon recorded that Butler was also considered for the post of Minister of Information but was kept in his current position, as Chamberlain found him too useful. Paul Stafford suggests that Butler's closeness to Chamberlain was partly due to Chamberlain's wish to avoid war as far as possible, unlike Halifax and most other members of the Cabinet, who had been resigned to war, albeit at a moment opportune to Britain.

On 20 October 1939, after the fall of Poland, Butler was, according to Soviet Ambassador Ivan Maisky, still open to a compromise peace and agreement to restore Germany's colonies to her if it was guaranteed by all the powers, including the Americans and the Soviets. Butler dismissed as an "absurdity" any suggestion that Germany first be required to withdraw from Poland. Butler disapproved of Churchill, who was then First Lord of the Admiralty and publicly opposed any hint of a compromise peace. After Churchill made a confident war speech on 12 November 1939 that was not vetted by the Foreign Office and said that it was "absolutely for certain" that the war must end in the utter defeat of either Britain and France or Nazi Germany, Butler had to tell the Italian Ambassador – Italy was still neutral at the time – that Churchill was speaking only for himself, not for the government. Butler told Jock Colville that he "thought it beyond words vulgar". Butler again hoped in vain to be promoted to a ministry of his own on Hore-Belisha's dismissal (5 January 1940).

On 10 and 12 January 1940, Butler strongly opposed Operation Catherine, Churchill's proposal to send a fleet of warships into the Baltic to interdict Swedish iron ore shipments to Germany.

Butler was quicker than many to realise the social change that war would bring. He spoke to Robert Barrington-Ward of The Times (12 February 1940) of "the new social revolution that is making its way, and how to anticipate and meet it". Maisky proposed (22 February) Butler as an intermediary in the Winter War. Channon was opposed to this and thought it would be seen as another Munich. Butler opposed (12 March) the government's plans to send an expeditionary force to Finland if talks with the Soviet Union broke down.

On 13 March 1940, Butler still hoped to get Pope Pius XII, Mussolini and President Roosevelt to put pressure on Hitler to make peace. According to Butler's diary, he believed that Halifax would be open to that plan.

=== May 1940: Churchill takes power ===
With Chamberlain's position untenable after the Norway Debate, the choice for the premiership was between Halifax and Churchill. The matter was decided at a meeting between Chamberlain and the two candidates on 9 May. Butler had already briefed Halifax about his conversation with the senior Labour politician Hugh Dalton the previous evening, who had said that Labour refused to serve under Chamberlain or "in the company of [Sir John] Simon" but preferred Halifax to Churchill as Prime Minister and that Churchill "must "stick to the war". (Note: There is some evidence that Labour opinion shifted a little towards Churchill over the next day or two.)

Butler called on Halifax in a final effort (10 May 1940) to persuade him to accept appointment as Prime Minister, but Halifax said that was out at the dentist. Churchill was appointed instead. Colville recorded in his diary on 10 May 1940 that Butler; Lord Dunglass, (as Lord Home was then called); and two others drank the health of the "King over the Water":

Rab said he thought that the good clean tradition of English politics, that of Pitt as opposed to Fox, had been sold to the greatest adventurer of modern political history. He had tried earnestly and long to persuade Halifax to accept the Premiership, but he had failed. He believed this sudden coup of Winston and his rabble was a serious disaster and an unnecessary one: the 'pass has been sold' by Mr. C., Lord Halifax and Oliver Stanley [who had recently given a poor speech in the Norway Debate]. They had weakly surrendered to a half-breed American [i.e. Churchill] whose main support was that of inefficient but talkative people of a similar type.

Butler wrote to Chamberlain on 11 May to urge him to carry on as a member of the government in the hope of achieving a negotiated peace. Butler later grew to respect Churchill after he had served under him.

Butler was reappointed to his Foreign Office position on 15 May 1940. Churchill told him, "I wish you to go on with your delicate manner of answering parliamentary questions without giving anything away".

=== June 1940: Prytz Affair ===
On 17 June 1940, three days after the fall of Paris and the day that Marshal Philippe Pétain asked for an armistice, Butler had a mysterious meeting in St James's Park with a Swedish envoy, Björn Prytz. The meeting may have been deliberate, as the park is a traditional place for government figures to arrange to meet "accidentally". The meeting continued for a few minutes in the Foreign Office during which Butler conferred briefly with Lord Halifax in his office. Peace proposals had been made through Swedish channels in autumn 1939, and in late May, Halifax had suggested approaching Italy, which was on the verge of entering the war, to see if a compromise peace could be brokered; the idea was vehemently resisted by Churchill). Prytz reported to Stockholm that Butler had declared that British policy must be determined by "common sense not bravado" (the phrase was repeated in English) and that he had "assured me that no opportunity for reaching a compromise (peace) would be neglected if the possibility were offered on reasonable conditions". Prytz's report mentioned that Halifax might succeed Churchill as Prime Minister at the end of June 1940. Christian Günther, the Swedish Foreign Minister, asked Victor Mallet, the British Envoy to Sweden, for clarification. On 20 June, after another meeting with Butler, Prytz requested that the cable not be forwarded to Berlin, which in Jago's view might suggest that that had been Butler's original intention.

Churchill was furious when he found out, probably through intelligence intercepts of Swedish diplomatic cables. He wrote to Halifax on 26 June complaining of Butler's "odd language", which hinted at a lukewarm or even defeatist attitude. Butler, who was lucky not to have been sacked, made a four-page handwritten reply the same day, claiming that he had kept to the official British line and had said "nothing definite or specific that I would wish to withdraw", but offering to resign. On 28 June, after being shown Churchill's letter, Butler wrote to Halifax that "you might enquire why... I was reported as saying that "common sense and not bravado" would dictate our policy". Butler gave an unconvincing explanation, which he later repeated in his memoirs, that by "common sense not bravado", he had been pushing the official line that there could be no peace until Germany had disgorged its conquests. Jago argues that the slightly odd wording suggests that Halifax had suggested the phrase and that Butler may have been covering for him.

Halifax's biographer Andrew Roberts describes Butler's explanation as "risible" and offers a different interpretation. He believes that Butler, who did not get on with Halifax and was never invited to his home, was unaware of Cabinet-level policy changes and had been putting words into Halifax's mouth. Roberts argues that Halifax, who on 17 June was wishing in his diary that a single bomb would kill Hitler and Mussolini, had already moved away from his earlier openness to a compromise peace. On 22 July, Halifax delivered a speech rejecting Hitler's public "peace offer" of 19 July, and he also rejected further tentative German peace feelers throughout the year.

== Final months at Foreign Office ==
Butler kept his job and was allowed to make two broadcasts on the BBC on 21 October and 15 December 1940. At the reshuffle on Chamberlain's resignation from the government on 22 October 1940, Churchill's close ally Brendan Bracken offered Butler promotion to the Cabinet-level job of President of the Board of Education, but no offer was forthcoming from Churchill. Butler and Channon had prominent places in the second pew at Chamberlain's funeral (14 November 1940).

Butler had little respect for Eden but reluctantly agreed to remain at the Foreign Office when the latter once again became Foreign Secretary in December 1940. In March 1941, with Eden in Cairo, Churchill handled Foreign Office business personally, instead of delegating it to Butler. By then, Butler's responsibilities had been restricted to "routine drudgery" such as negotiating safe passage for diplomats, repatriation of neutral seamen and, on one occasion, arranging extra clothing coupons for foreign diplomats so that the Duke of Alba could buy more socks. Butler and Geoffrey Lloyd attempted to register for military service in May 1941, but their application was referred to Ernest Bevin (Minister of Labour), who in turn referred it to Churchill. He vetoed it on the grounds that their work as government ministers was more important. As late as May 1941, a memo from Hitler to Albrecht Haushofer, a foreign policy advisor to Rudolf Hess, listed Butler as somebody in London who was likely to be sympathetic to peace talks.

== Sources ==
- Addison, Paul (1994). The Road to 1945. London: Pimlico. ISBN 978-0712659321.
- Ball, Simon (2004). The Guardsmen. London: HarperCollins. ISBN 978-0-002-57110-4.
- Bouverie, Tim (2019). Appeasing Hitler. London: Bodley Head. ISBN 978-1-847-92440-7.
- Campbell, John (2010). Pistols at Dawn: Two Hundred Years of Political Rivalry from Pitt and Fox to Blair and Brown. London: Vintage. ISBN 978-1-845-95091-0. (contains an essay on Macmillan and Butler)
- Cosgrave, Patrick (1981). R.A.Butler: An English Life. London: Quartet Books. ISBN 978-0704322585.
- Howard, Anthony RAB: The Life of R. A. Butler, Jonathan Cape 1987 ISBN 978-0-224-01862-3 excerpt
- Jago, Michael Rab Butler: The Best Prime Minister We Never Had?, Biteback Publishing 2015 ISBN 978-1849549202
- Matthew, Colin (2004). Dictionary of National Biography. Vol. 9. Oxford: Oxford University Press. ISBN 978-0198614111., essay on Butler written by Ian Gilmour
- Roberts, Andrew (2004). Holy Fox: Biography of Lord Halifax. London: Phoenix. ISBN 978-1-857-99472-8.
- Stafford, Paul. "Political Autobiography and the Art of the Plausible: RA Butler at the Foreign Office, 1938–1939." Historical Journal 28.04 (1985): 901–922. in JSTOR
- Stewart, Graham (2007) [1999]. Burying Caesar : Churchill, Chamberlain and the Battle for the Tory Party. London: Phoenix. ISBN 978-0-753-81060-6. (originally published 1999).
- Toye, Richard (2008). Lloyd George and Churchill: Rivals for Greatness. London: Pan Macmillan. ISBN 978-0-330-43472-0.
- Ziegler, Philip (2011). Diana Cooper: The Biography of Lady Diana Cooper. London: Faber and Faber. ISBN 978-0-571-27957-9. (originally published 1981).

=== Primary sources ===
- Butler, Rab (1971). The Art of the Possible. London: Hamish Hamilton. ISBN 978-0241020074., his autobiography

Parliament of the United Kingdom
Preceded by William Mitchell	Member of Parliament for Saffron Walden; 1929–1965	Succeeded by Peter Kirk
Political offices
Preceded by The Marquess of Lothian	Under Secretary of State for India; 1932–1937	Succeeded by The Lord Stanley
Preceded by Anthony Muirhead	Parliamentary Secretary to the Ministry of Labour; 1937–1938	Succeeded by Alan Lennox-Boyd
Preceded by The Viscount Cranborne	Under Secretary of State for Foreign Affairs; 1938–1941; Served alongside: The Earl of Plymouth (1938–1940)	Succeeded by Richard Law
