= Simon Commission =

Report on possible constitutional reform in British India

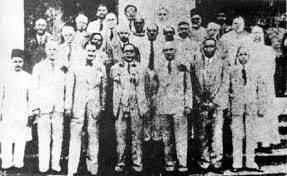
The Simon Commission

The Indian Statutory Commission, also known as the Simon Commission, was a group of seven members of the British Parliament under the chairmanship of John Simon. The commission arrived in the Indian subcontinent in 1928 to study constitutional reform in British India. One of its members was Clement Attlee, who would later become the Prime Minister of the United Kingdom (1945–1951).

Some of the most prominent supporters of the Simon Commission were Dr. B. R. Ambedkar, Periyar E. V. Ramasamy and Chaudhary Chhotu Ram.

== Background ==
The commission was constituted because, at the time the Montagu–Chelmsford Reforms were introduced in 1919, the British Government had declared that a commission would be sent to India after 10 years to examine the effects and operations of the constitutional reforms and to suggest further reforms.

In November 1927, the British government appointed the Simon Commission two years ahead of schedule. The commission was strongly opposed by the Muslim League and the Indian National Congress, and prominent Indian leaders including Nehru, Gandhi, and Jinnah, because it contained only British members and no Indians. However, it was supported by Dr. B. R. Ambedkar, Periyar E. V. Ramasamy and Chaudhary Chhotu Ram.

Prominent Indian nationalist Lala Lajpat Rai led a protest against the commission in Lahore. He suffered a brutal police beating during the protest and died of heart attack eighteen days later on 17 November 1928.

The Government of India Act 1919 had introduced the system of diarchy to govern the provinces of British India. Indian opinion clamoured for a revision of this form of government, and the Government of India Act 1919 provided that a commission would be appointed after 10 years to investigate the progress of the government scheme and to suggest new steps for reform. The Secretary of State for India F.E. Smith feared that the ruling Conservative government was facing imminent electoral defeat at the hands of the Labour Party, and hence feared that the commission would be filled by its members and sympathizers. Hence, the commission was appointed ahead of time, and seven MPs were selected to constitute the promised commission to examine the state of Indian constitutional affairs. He also ensured that there were no Indians in the commission, as he believed the Labour MPs and Indian members would join. The Viceroy of India Lord Irwin too supported the decision to exclude Indians, as he too thought they would vote together with the Labour MPs, but also because he thought the Indian representatives would fight each other.

Some people in India were outraged and insulted that the Simon Commission, which was to determine the future of India, did not include a single Indian member. The Indian National Congress, at its December 1927 meeting in Madras (now Chennai), resolved to boycott the Commission and challenged Lord Birkenhead, the Secretary of State for India, to draft a constitution that would be acceptable to the Indian populace. A faction of the Muslim League, led by Mohammed Ali Jinnah, also decided to boycott the commission.

In the face of the opposition from the Congress, F.E. Smith wanted to publicise the meetings of the commission with "representative Muslims" in order to "terrify the immense Hindu population by apprehension that the Commission is being got hold of by the Muslims and may present a report altogether destructive of the Hindu population."

However opinion was divided, with support for co-operation coming from some members of the Muslim League and also both Hindu Mahasabha and members of the Central Sikh League. An All-India Committee for Cooperation with the Simon Commission was established by the Council of India and by selection of the Viceroy, Lord Irwin. The members of the committee were: C. Sankaran Nair (chairman), Arthur Froom, Nawab Ali Khan, Shivdev Singh Uberoi, Zulfiqar Ali Khan, Hari Singh Gour, Abdullah Al-Mamun Suhrawardy, Kikabhai Premchand and Prof. M. C. Rajah.

In Burma (Now known as Myanmar), which was included in the terms of reference of the Simon Commission, there was strong suspicion either that Burma's unpopular union with India would continue, or that the constitution recommended for Burma by the commission would be less generous than that chosen for India; these suspicions resulted in tension and violence in Burma leading to the rebellion of Saya San.

The commission found that the education was being denied to the untouchables who were ill-treated in the name of caste.

== Protests and injuries of Lala Lajpat Rai ==
The Simon Commission left England in January 1928. Almost immediately with Its arrival in Bombay on 3 February 1928, its members were confronted by throngs of protesters, although there were also some supporters among the crowds who saw it as the next step on the road to self-governance. A strike began and many people turned out to greet the commission with black flags on which was written 'Simon Go Back'. Maghfoor Ahmad Ajazi led the demonstrations against Simon Commission in Patna. Similar protests occurred in every major Indian city that the seven British MPs visited.

One protest against the Simon Commission became infamous. On 30 October 1928, the Commission arrived at Lahore where it was met by protesters waving black flags. The protest was led by the Indian nationalist Lala Lajpat Rai, who had moved a resolution against the Commission in the Legislative Assembly of Punjab in February 1928. The protesters blocked the road in order to prevent the commission members from leaving the railway station. In order to make way for the commission, the local police led by Superintendent James Scott began beating protesters. Lala Lajpat Rai was critically injured and died on 17 November 1928 due to heart attack .

== Recommendations ==
The Commission published its 2-volume report in June 1930. The commission proposed to abolish the diarchy, an extension to autonomy of provinces by establishing representative government in provinces. However it allowed the British governors of provinces to retain much of their emergency powers, hence in practice very little autonomy was to be given to the provinces. Most notably the commission's report did not mention dominion status at all. The commission also recommended to retain separate electorates as long as inter-communal tensions between Hindus and Muslims remained.

== Aftermath ==
In September 1928, ahead of the commission's release, Motilal Nehru presented his Nehru Report to counter its charges that Indians could not find a constitutional consensus among themselves. This report advocated that India be given dominion status with complete internal self-government. Jinnah declared the report as "Hindu Document" and presented Fourteen Points of Jinnah in response to the Nehru Report. The Fourteen Points consisted of Muslim's minimum demands from the British Rule.

By the time it was published the commission was already overshadowed by a declaration by the Viceroy of India Lord Irwin on 31 October 1929 which reinterpreted the 1917 declaration (which had led to the Mortagu-Chelmsford reforms) as the British government's final policy goal always being India's attainment of dominion status. He also called for a round-table conference in London regarding this. Although this remained controversial among many conservatives in London, in reality there was no change in British policy as the promise was very vague and far in the future.

The outcome of the Simon Commission was the Government of India Act 1935, which called for a "responsible" government at the provincial level in India but not at the national level—that is a government responsible to the Indian community rather than London. It is the basis of many parts of the Indian Constitution. In 1937 the first elections were held in the Provinces, resulting in Congress Governments being returned in almost all Provinces.

Clement Attlee was deeply moved by his experience on the commission and endorsed the final report. However, by 1933 he argued that British rule was alien to India and was unable to make the social and economic reforms necessary for India's progress. He became the British leader most sympathetic to Indian independence (as a dominion), preparing him for his role in deciding on Indian independence as British Prime Minister in 1947.

== Members of the Commission ==
- Sir John Simon, MP for Spen Valley (Liberal, chairman)
- Clement Attlee, MP for Limehouse (Labour)
- Harry Levy-Lawson, 1st Viscount Burnham
- Edward Cadogan, MP for Finchley (Conservative)
- Vernon Hartshorn, MP for Ogmore (Labour)
- George Lane-Fox, MP for Barkston Ash (Conservative)
- Donald Howard, 3rd Baron Strathcona and Mount Royal

== See also ==
- Delhi Statement
