= Granville Austin =

Historian of the Indian Constitution (1927–2014)

Granville Seward Austin
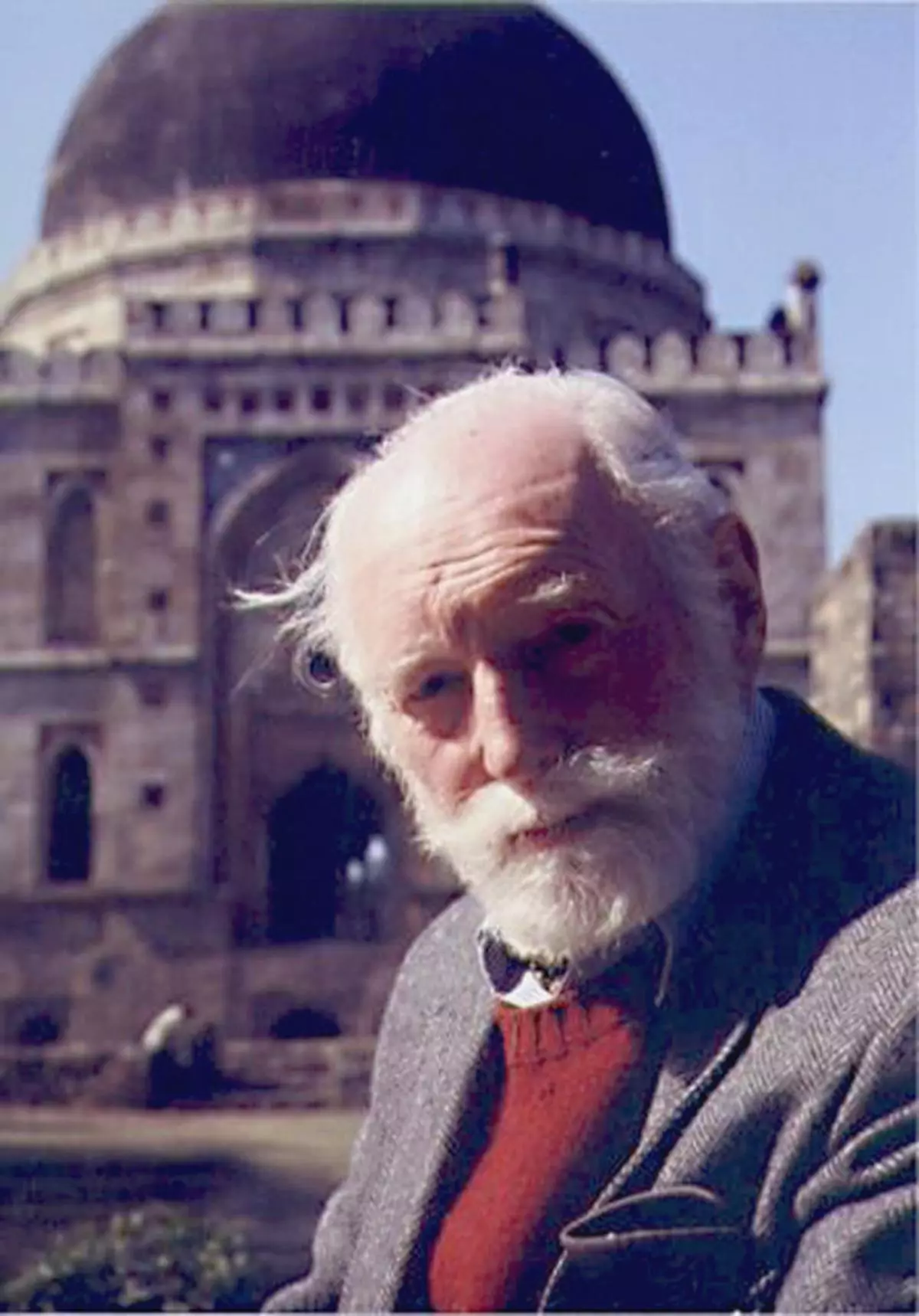
- Born: 1927
- Died: July 6, 2014
- Education: Oxford University
- Awards: Padma Shri

Granville Seward Austin (1927 – 6 July 2014) was a US civil servant and a historian of the Indian Constitution.

== Education ==
Austin received most of his early education at Norwich, Vermont, USA. Austin graduated from Dartmouth College with a BA in American Literature. He then earned a doctorate in Modern Indian History from Oxford University.

== Career ==
He worked as a journalist and photographer, later served with the U. S. Information Service, Department of State, Department of Health, Education and Welfare, and on the staff of a U. S. senator. He has held fellowships or grants from St. Antony's College, Oxford, the Ford Foundation, the Fulbright Program, the American Institute of Indian Studies, the Rockefeller Foundation, the Woodrow Wilson International Center for Scholars, the Rajiv Gandhi Foundation, and the Institute of Current World Affairs.

Austin was the author of two seminal political histories of the constitution of India, The Indian Constitution: Cornerstone of a Nation and Working a Democratic Constitution: The Indian Experience.

While serving as director of the State Department's Near East and South Asia office, he reviewed intelligence reports pertaining to the 1967 USS Liberty incident. He became convinced the Israelis knew they were attacking an American naval vessel: “They knew damn well what it was. That it was an accident, of course, was nonsense.”

== Awards ==
In 2011, in recognition for his writing on the framing and working of the Indian Constitution, Granville Austin was awarded a Padma Shri award, the fourth highest civilian honor of the Republic of India. National Translation Mission of the Ministry of Human Resource Development of the Government of India has selected The Indian Constitution: Cornerstone of a Nation for translation into Indian languages. As of 2017 the book had been published in the Telugu, Marathi, Punjabi, Odia, Hindi and Malayalam languages.

== Death ==
He died on 6 July 2014.

== Bibliography ==
- The Indian Constitution: Cornerstone of a Nation (Oxford, Oxford University Press, 1966).
- Working a Democratic Constitution: The Indian Experience (New Delhi, Oxford University Press, 1999).
- Retrieving Times (White River Press, 2008)
