= Fourteen Points of Jinnah =

1929 reform plan for British India

The Fourteen Points of Jinnah, also known as Jinnah's Fourteen Points, was a political proposal, presented in 1929, by Muhammad Ali Jinnah for future constitutional reforms in British Raj. They constituted the Muslim League's response to the Nehru report with demands to safeguard Muslim political rights in India.

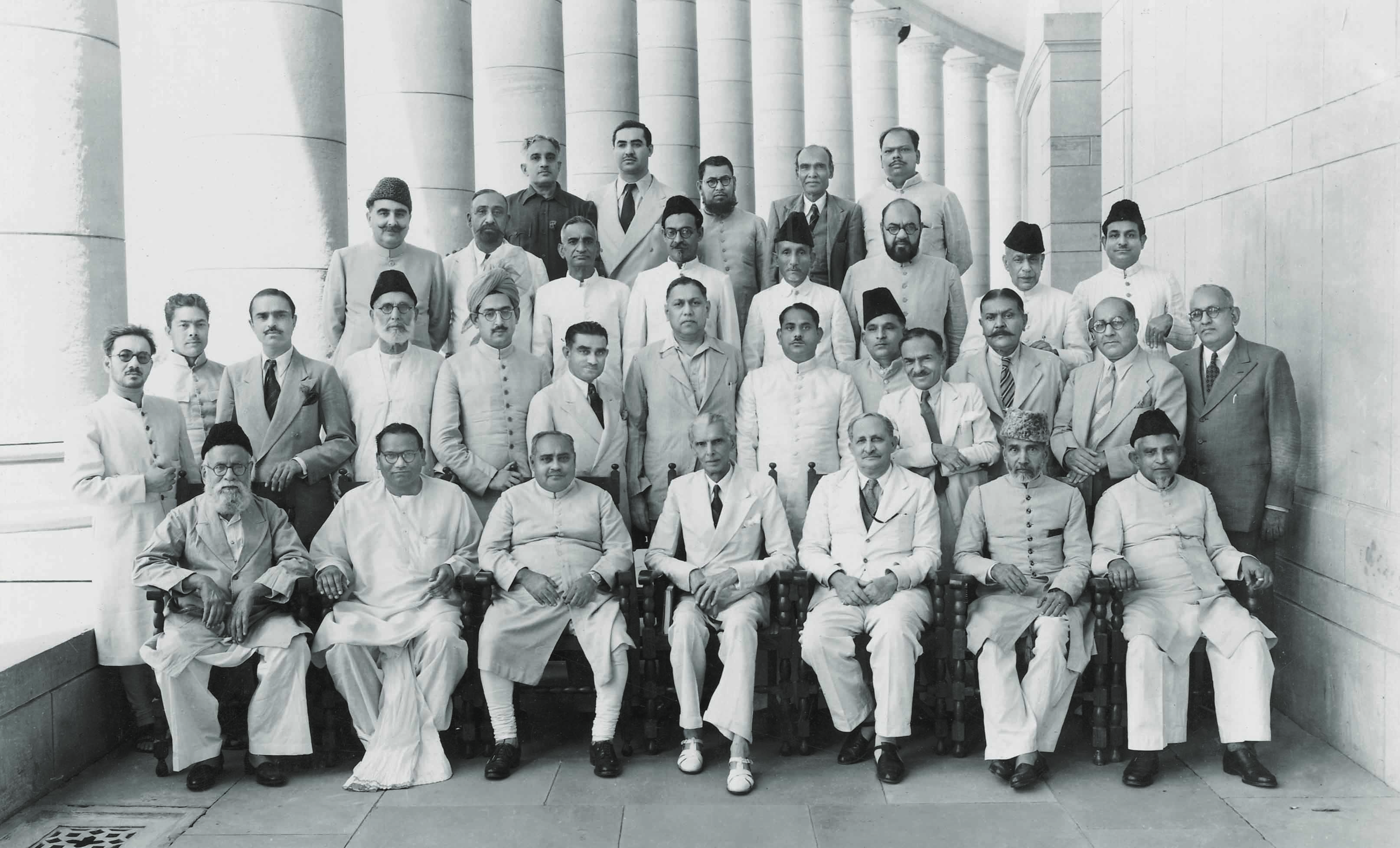
Jinnah (seated, center) with Muslim League leaders in the corridor of the Central Legislative Assembly (1946)

It consisted of the four Delhi proposals, the three Calcutta amendments, demands for the continuation of separate electorates and reservation of seats for Muslims in government services and self-governing bodies. In 1928, an All Parties Conference was convened in reaction to the Simon Commission appointed to discuss parliamentary reform in British Raj. A committee was set up under Motilal Nehru which prepared the "Nehru Report". This report demanded "Dominion Status" for British India. Separate electorates were refused and the reservation of seats for the Muslims of Bengal and Punjab was rejected. The Nehru Report did not uphold a single demand of the Muslim League.

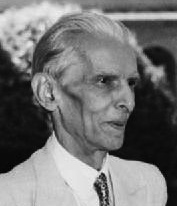
Muhammad Ali Jinnah, the proposer of the demands

In reaction to the Nehru Report, the League authorised Jinnah to draft terms for the basis of any future constitution for British India, which would protect the interests of the Muslims. He presented his 14 points and stated it was the "parting of ways" and that he did not want anything to do with the Indian National Congress in the future. The points gave the Muslim League a direction and framework of its demands, and greatly influenced the Muslims' thinking for the next two decades until the establishment of Pakistan in 1947.

== Background ==
The report was given in a meeting of the council of the All India Muslim League on 9 March 1929. The Nehru Report was criticized by Muslim leaders Aga Khan and Muhammad Shafi. They considered it as a death warrant because it recommended joint electoral rolls for Hindus and Muslims. Muhammad Ali Jinnah left for England in May 1928 and returned after six months. In March 1929, the Muslim League session was held in Delhi under the presidency of Jinnah. In his address to his delegates, he consolidated Muslim viewpoints under fourteen items and these fourteen points became Jinnah's 14 points and the manifesto of the All India Muslim League.

== The Points ==
The original points as presented by Jinnah with the spelling, the punctuation, and the structure preserved:

1. The form of the future constitution should be federal, with the residuary powers vested in the provinces.
2. A uniform measure of autonomy shall be granted to all provinces.
3. All legislatures in the country and other elected bodies shall be constituted on the definite principle of adequate and effective representation of minorities in every Province without reducing the majority in any Province to a minority or even equality.
4. In the Central Legislature, Muslim representation shall not be less than one third.
5. Representation of communal groups shall continue to be by means of separate electorates as at present, provided it shall be open to any community, at any time, to abandon its separate electorate in favour of joint electorate.
6. Any territorial redistribution that might at any time be necessary shall not in any way, affect the Muslim majority in the Punjab, Bengal and N. W. F. Province.
7. Full religious liberty i.e., liberty of belief, worship and observance, propaganda, association and education, shall be guaranteed to all communities.
8. No bill or resolution or any part thereof shall be passed in any legislature or any other elected body if three fourths of the members of any community in that particular body oppose such a bill, resolution or part thereof on the ground that it would be injurious to the interests of that community or in the alternative, such other method is devised as may be found feasible and practicable to deal with such cases.
9. Sind should be separated from the Bombay Presidency.
10. Reforms should be introduced in the N. W. F. Province and Baluchistan on the same footing as in other provinces.
11. Provision should be made in the constitution giving Muslims an adequate share along with the other Indians, in all the services of the State and in local self-governing bodies having due regard to the requirements of efficiency.
12. The constitution should embody adequate safeguards for the protection of Muslim culture and for the protection and promotion of Muslim education, language, religion, personal laws and Muslim charitable institutions and for their due share in the grants-in-aid given by the State and by local self-governing bodies.
13. No cabinet, either Central or Provincial, should be formed without there being a proportion of at least one-third Muslim Ministers.
14. No change shall be made in the Constitution by the Central Legislature except with the concurrence of the States constituting the Indian Federation.

== Reactions ==
The Muslim leadership, including Aga Khan III and Mian Muhammad Shafi among others, praised Muhammad Ali Jinnah and accepted the points as the Muslims' political manifesto. The poet-philosopher Muhammad Iqbal supported Jinnah's stance and later built on it in his Allahabad Address in 1930 where he envisioned a separate Muslim homeland. It was also supported by the Muslim masses as it sought to strengthen their political representation and protect their rights and interests.

The Indian National Congress wholly rejected the demands with Jawaharlal Nehru referring to them as "Jinnah's ridiculous 14 points". Motilal Nehru and other top Congress leaders were heavily against the demands as it sought to establish a less centralised government with more autonomy given to the provinces, while they pushed for a strongly centralised government without separate electorates.

The Fourteen Points have been referred to by historians as the "blueprint for Pakistan" and accounting its rejection by the Congress as deepening the Hindu-Muslim divide. It also strengthened Jinnah's image as the principal spokesperson of the Muslims.
