= Nehru Report =

Memorandum proposing a dominion status constitution for India

The Nehru Report of 1928 was a memorandum drafted by All Parties Conference under the chairmanship of Motilal Nehru in British India to appeal for a new dominion status and a federal set-up of government for the constution of India. It also proposed for the Joint Electorates with reservation of seats for minorities in the legislatures.

M K Gandhi proposed a resolution saying that British should be given one year to accept the recommendations of the Nehru report or a campaign of non-cooperation would begin. The resolution was passed.

== Background ==
British policy, until almost the end of the Raj, was that the timing and nature of Indian constitutional development was to be decided exclusively by the British Parliament, but it was assumed that Indians would be consulted as appropriate. This was formally stated in the Government of India Act 1919. Britain did not acknowledge the right of Indians to frame their own constitution until the 1942 Cripps Declaration.

A non-official effort to draft a new constitution was made by Annie Besant and a few of her Indian friends. Most of the leaders were rather cool toward her project, but it was somewhat revised by a so-called All-Parties Conference which met at Delhi in January–February, 1925, and was formally approved by a convention held at Kanpur in April. It was drafted as a statute and introduced in the House of Commons by Labour MP George Lansbury, December 9, 1925, under the title, "The Commonwealth of India Bill." The bill proposed to confer upon India at once the full status of a Dominion, subject to certain temporary reservations. The Viceroy, as the representative of the King-Emperor, was to have complete charge of military and naval forces and foreign relations until the Indian Parliament by its own act should signify its readiness to assume control. Any step taken by the Indian Parliament concerning the Indian States must have the previous approval of the Viceroy. There was a Bill of Rights which included, among other things, guarantees of personal liberty, freedom of conscience, freedom of speech, and equality of gender. this scheme did not arouse any popular enthusiasm, partly perhaps because it was not really an Indian product, but mainly because of the negative character of the Nationalist movement. The leaders were more interested in opposing the existing system than they were in preparing a constructive alternative.

In November 1927, the British government appointed the Simon Commission to review the working of the Government of India Act 1919 and propose constitutional reforms for India. The Commission did not have a single Indian member which irritated leaders of the nationalist movement. While the British acknowledged the discontent, it did not consider making changes to the composition of the commission; it justified exclusion of Indians on the basis of their disunity & instead asked Indians to prove that they could unanimously draw up a constitution themselves. A similar challenge was made in 1925 by Conservative MP Lord Birkenhead, Secretary of State for India, following a racist anti-Indian speech in the House of Lords, stated:

... let the Indians produce a constitution which carries behind it a fair measure of general agreement among the great peoples of India...

Leaders of the nationalist movement responded to the challenge by drafting the Nehru Report.

In December 1927, at its Madras session, the Indian National Congress, took two major decisions in response to the setting up the Simon Commission: first, it decided to not cooperate with the commission; second, it set up an All Parties Conference to draft a Constitution for India.

== The Report ==
The constitution outlined by the Nehru Report was for Indian enjoying dominion status within the British Commonwealth. Some of the important elements of the report include:

- Unlike the eventual Government of India Act 1935 it contained a All power of government is in the hand of dave veer and all authority – legislative, executive and judicial – are derived from the people and the same shall be exercised through organisations established by, or under, and in accord with, this Constitution.
- There shall be no state religion; men and women shall have equal rights as citizens.
- There should be federal form of government with residuary powers vested in the centre. (Some scholars, such as Moore considered the Nehru Report proposal as essentially unitary rather than federal);
- It included a description of the machinery of government including a proposal for the creation of a Supreme Court and a suggestion that the provinces should be linguistically determined.
- It did not provide for separate electorates for any community or weightage for minorities. Both of these were liberally provided in the eventual Government of India Act 1935. However, it did allow for the reservation of minority seats in provinces having a minorities of at least ten percent, but this was to be in strict proportion to the size of the community.
- The language of the Union shall be Hindustani, which may be written either in Devanagari or Urdu character. The use of the English language shall be permitted.

The Nehru Report, along with that of the Simon Commission was available to participants in the three Indian Round Table Conferences (1930–1932). However, the Government of India Act 1935 owes much to the Simon Commission report and little, if anything to the Nehru Report.

== Muslim League's reaction to the Nehru Report ==
With some exceptions League leaders failed to pass the Nehru proposals. In reaction Mohammad Ali Jinnah drafted his Fourteen Points in 1929 which became the core demands of the Muslim community which they put forward as the price of their participating in an independent united India. Their main objections were:

- Separate electorates and weightage — the 1916 Congress-Muslim League agreement Lucknow Pact provided these to the Muslim community whereas they were rejected by the Nehru Report.
- Residuary powers — the Muslims realized that while they would be a majority in the provinces of the North-East and North-West of India, and hence would control their provincial legislatures, they would always be a minority at the centre. Thus they demanded, contrary to the Nehru Report, that residuary powers go to the provinces.

According to Mohammad Ali Jinnah, “The Committee has adopted a narrow minded policy to ruin the political future of the Muslims. I regret to declare that the report is extremely ambiguous and does not deserve to be implemented.”

== Reception ==
Reginald Coupland in The Constitutional Problem in India saw the Report as the "frankest attempt yet made by Indians to face squarely the difficulties of communalism..." and found its objective of claiming dominion status as remarkable. However, he argued that the Report "had little practical result". Granville Austin in India’s Constitution: Cornerstone of a Nation, highlighted that the fundamental rights section of the Nehru Report was "a close precursor of the Fundamental Rights of the Constitution [of India, 1950]…10 of the 19 subclauses re-appear, materially unchanged, and three of the Nehru rights are included in the Directive Principles". Neera Chandhoke's in her chapter in The Indian Constituent Assembly (edited) argued that "the inclusion of social and cultural rights in a predominantly liberal constitution appears extraordinary". Niraja Jayal in Citizenship and Its Discontents suggested that the Nehru Report, in the context of the international discourse of rights around the late 1920s, was a "rather exceptional document in its early envisioning of social and economic rights".

== See also ==
- Indian Round Table Conferences 1931-1933
- Proposed Indian Round Table Conference 1922
- Khilafat Movement
