= Jamsetjee =

Jamsetjee is a given name. Notable people with the name include:

- Avabai Jamsetjee Jeejeebhoy (born 1793), the wife of Sir Jamsetjee Jeejeebhoy, 1st baronet
- Sir Jamsetjee Jejeebhoy, 1st Baronet (1783–1859), also spelt Jeejeebhoy or Jeejebhoy, was a Parsi-Indian merchant and philanthropist
- Sir Jamsetjee Jejeebhoy, 2nd Baronet, CSI, (1811–1877), Indian businessman
- Sir Jamsetjee Jejeebhoy, 3rd Baronet, CSI, (1851–1898), Indian businessman
- Sir Jamsetjee Jejeebhoy, 4th Baronet, (1853–1908), Indian businessman
- Sir Jamsetjee Jejeebhoy, 5th Baronet, KCSI, (1878–1931), Indian businessman

== See also ==
- Sir Jamsetjee Jeejebhoy School of Art (Sir J. J. School of Art), is the oldest art institution in Mumbai, and is affiliated with the University of Mumbai
