= 1923 Indian general election =

- 1923

105 of the 145 seats in the Central Legislative Assembly 73 seats needed for a majority
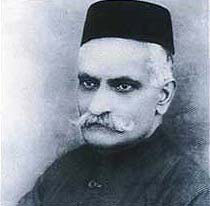

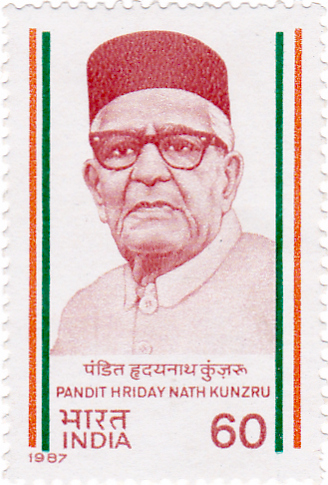
	First party	Second party
Leader	Motilal Nehru	H. N. Kunzru
Party	SP	ILP
Seats won	38	27

General elections were held in British India in November 1923 for both the Central Legislative Assembly and provincial assemblies. The Central Legislative Assembly had 145 seats, of which 105 were elected by the public.

The Assembly was opened on 21 January 1924 by Viceroy Lord Reading.

== Results ==
=== Legislative Assembly ===
Party	Seats
Swaraj Party	38
Indian Liberal Party	27
Loyalists	6
Brahmins	3
Gurdwara Sikhs	2
Liberals	2
Unknown allegiance	20
Independents	7
Appointed members	40
Total	145
Source: The Times

=== Provincial assemblies ===
Results in provincial assemblies

Province	Anti-Ministerialists	Justice Party	Swaraj Party	Others	Independents	Appointed	Unfilled seats^{[a]}	Total
Assam			14	39			0	53
Bengal			49	87			3	139
Bihar and Orissa			12	82			9	103
Central Provinces			50	19			0	69
Bombay			32	72			7	111
Madras	37	44	11	6	0	28	0	127
Punjab			28	65			0	93
United Provinces			38	84			1	123
Source: The Times, Saroja Sundararajan

^{a} Seats that were unfilled as of 1 January 1924

== Members of Central Legislative Assembly ==
=== Officials ===
- Government of India: Sir Malcolm Hailey, Charles Alexander Innes, Atul Chandra Chatterjee, Basil Phillott Blackett (Finance Member), Ernest Burdon, Alexander Muddiman (Home Member), Bhupendra Nath Mitra, Denys Bray, J. W. Bhore, Henry Moncrieff Smith, Montagu Sherard Dawes Butler, James Alexander Richey, L. F. Rushbrook Williams, Evelyn Berkeley Howell, Alfred Alen Lethbridge Parsons, Sir Geoffrey Clarke, Alexander Tottenham, Captain Ajab Khan, G. G. Sim, A. G. Clow, L. Graham, J. L. McCallum
- Nominated from Provinces: T. E. Moir (Madras), Julius Matheson Turing (Madras), Philip Edward Percival (Bombay), Percy Barnes Haigh (Bombay), Walter Hudson (Bombay), Lewis Sydney Steward O'Malley (Bengal), Girish Chandra Nag (Bengal), Muhammad Abdul Mumin (Bengal), R. A. Wilson (Central Provinces), Rustomji Faridoonji (Central Provinces), Basil Copleston Allen (Assam), William Alexander Cosgrave (Assam), Frank Charles Owens (Burma), H. Tonkison (Burma), Shyam Narayan Singh (Bihar & Orissa), Henry Edward Holme (United Provinces), E. H. Ashworth (United Provinces), Hubert Calvert (Punjab)
- Berar Representative: Madhav Shrihari Aney

=== Nominated non-officials ===
- Provinces: P. S. Sivaswami Iyer (Madras), Sahibzada Abdul Qayyum (NWFP), Sardar Bahadur Captain Hira Singh (Punjab)
- Special Interests: Henry Gidney (Anglo-Indian), Surendra Kumar Datta (Indian Christians), N. M. Joshi (Labour Interests)

=== Elected non-officials ===
- Ajmer-Merwara: Harbilas Sarda
- Assam: Tarun Ram Phookan (Assam Valley General), Kamini Kumar Chanda (Surma Valley cum Shillong General), Ahmad Ali Khan (Muslim), Eustace Joseph (European), T. A. Chalmers (European)
- Bengal: Bipin Chandra Pal (Calcutta General), Tulsi Chandra Goswami (Calcutta Suburbs General), Amar Nath Dutt (Burdwan General), Bhabendra Chandra Roy (Presidency General), K. C. Neogy (Dacca Rural General), Kumar Sankar Ray (Chittagong & Rajshahi General), Yacoob C. Ariff (Calcutta & Suburbs Muslim), Mohammad Shams-us-Zoha (Burdwan & Presidency Muslim), Alimuazzam Chowdhry (Dacca Muslim), Khwaja Abdul Karim (Dacca Muslim), Muhammad Kazim Ali (Chittagong Rural Muslim), Khabeeruddin Ahmed (Rajshahi Rural Muslim), Sir Campbell Rhodes (European), Darcy Lindsay (European), W. S. J. Wilson (European), Col. J. D. Crawford (European), Surendra Chandra Ghose (Landholders), Rang Lal Jajodia (Marwari Association)
- Bihar & Orissa: Nilakantha Das (Orissa General), Bhabananda Das (Orissa General), Anugrah Narayan Sinha (Patna-cum-Shahabad General), Hari Prasad Lal (Gaya-cum-Monghyr General), Ganganand Sinha (Bhagalpur, Purnea & Santhal Parganas General), Devaki Prasad Sinha (Chota Nagpur General), Gaya Prasad Singh (Muzaffarpur-cum-Champaran General), Sarfaraz Husain Khan (Patna & Chota Nagar cum Orissa Muslim), Moulvi Mian Asjad-ul-lah (Bhagalpur Muslim), Muhammad Shafi Daoodi (Tirhut Muslim), Raja Raghunandan Prashad Singh (Landholders), Shyama Charan, Brajnandan Sahay, Saiyid Muhammad Ismail
- Bombay: Vithalbhai Patel (Bombay City General), Nowroji Maneckji Dumasia (Bombay City General), Seth Harchandrai Vishandas (Sind General), Jamnadas Mehta (Bombay Northern General), Narasimha Chintaman Kelkar (Bombay Central General), Krishnaji Govind Lohokare (Bombay Central General), Venkatesh Belvi (Bombay Southern General), Muhammad Ali Jinnah (Bombay City Muslim), W. M. Hussanally (Sind Muslim), Ghulam Muhammad Khan Bhurgri (Sind Muslim), Mahomed Ebrahim Makan (Bombay Northern Muslim), Sardar Mahboob Ali Khan Mohammad Akbar Khan (Bombay Southern Muhammadan), Purshottamdas Thakurdas (Indian Merchants Chamber), Kasturbhai Lalbhai (Ahmedabad Millowners Association), Sardar Vishnu Narayan Mutalik (Gujarat & Deccan Sardars & Inamdars), Henry Richard Dunk (European), Hugh Golding Cocke (European), E. F. Sykes (European), Sir Montagu de Pomeray Webb (European)
- Burma: Maung Tok Kyi (General), Maung Kun (General), Maung Ba Si (General), Edward Gibson Fleming (European)
- Central Provinces: M. V. Abhyankar (Nagpur General), Hari Singh Gour (Hindi Divisions General), Sambhu Dayal Misra (Hindi Divisions General), M. Samiullah Khan (Muslim), Seth Govind Das (Landholders)
- Delhi: Piyare Lal (General)
- Madras: T. Rangachari (Madras City General), Bhupatiraju Venkatapatiraju (Ganjam cum Vizagapatam General), Mocherla Ramachandra Rao (Godavari-cum-Krishna General), Kakutur Venkataramanareddi (Guntur cum Nellore General), Chetlur Doraiswamy Ayyangar (Madras ceded districts and Chittoor General), R. K. Shanmukham Chetty (Salem and Coimbatore cum North Arcot General), M. K. Acharya (South Arcot General), Krishna Rama Aiyangar (Madura & Ramnad cum Tinnevelly General), A. Rangaswami Iyengar (Tanjore & Trichy General), Maulvi Sayad Murtuza Sahib Bahadur (South Madras Muslim), Gordon Fraser (European), Kunhi Kammaran Nambiyar Chandroth Koodali Thazheteveetil (Landholders), M. Ct. M. Chidambaram Chettyar (Madras Indian Commerce), Haji S. A. K. Jeelani
- Punjab: Lala Dunichand (Ambala General), Bakshi Sohan Lal (Jullundur General), Lala Hansraj (Jullundur General), Diwan Chaman Lall (West Punjab General), Abdul Haye (East Punjab Muslim), Shaikh Sadiq Hasan (East Central Punjab Muslim), Khan Sahib Ghulam Bari (West Central Punjab Muslim), Chaudhri Baawal Baksh (North Punjab Muslim), Ghazanfar Ali Khan (North Punjab Muslim), Sayyad Ghulam Abbas (North West Punjab Muslim), Makhdum Syed Rajan Baksh Shah (South West Punjab Muslim), Sardar Gulab Singh (West Punjab Sikh)
- United Provinces: Motilal Nehru (UP Cities General), Shamlal Nehru (Meerut General), Narayan Das (Agra General), Madan Mohan Malaviya (Allahabad & Jhansi General), C. S. Ranga Iyer (Rohilkhand & Kumaon General), Krishna Kant Malaviya (Benaras & Gorakhpur General), H. N. Kunzru (Lucknow General), Pandit Harkaran Nath Misra (Lucknow General), Kishanlal Nehru (Fyzabad General), Haji Wajihuddin (UP Cities Muslim), Nawab Ismail Khan (Meerut Muslim), Maulvi Muhammad Yakub (Rohilkhand & Kumaon Muslim), Raja Amarpal Singh (Landholders), Colonel Sir Henry Stanyon (European), Rai Bahadur Raj Narain
- Other: H. P. Dayal, C. V. Vasantha Sastri
