= Chetty (surname) =

Chetty or Chetti is a surname. Notable people with the surname include:

- Chris Chetti (born 1974), American retired professional wrestler
- Cody Chetty (born 1991), South African former first-class cricketer
- G. Janakiram Chetty (born 1906), Indian merchant and politician
- G. N. Chetty (1881–1950), Indian merchant, landlord, politician, legislator and economist
- Gazulu Lakshminarasu Chetty (1806–1868), Indian merchant and political activist
- Ilyes Chetti (born 1995), Algerian footballer
- Jonnalagadda Gurappa Chetty, Indian painter, craftsman and writer
- K. P. Puttanna Chetty (1856–1938), British Indian administrator, bureaucrat and philanthropist
- Mergan Chetty (born 1968), South African politician
- Nalli Kuppuswami Chetti (born 1940), Indian textile industrialist and philanthropist
- P. Theagaraya Chetty (1852–1925), Indian lawyer, industrialist and political leader, one of the founders of the Justice Party
- R. K. Shanmukham Chetty (1892–1953), Indian lawyer, economist and politician, first finance minister of India
- Raj Chetty (born 1979), Indian-born American economist
- Sami Venkatachalam Chetty (died 1958), Indian politician, businessman and Indian independence activist
- Simon Casie Chetty (1807–1860), Ceylonese civil servant, author and politician
- Sylvie Chetty, New Zealand marketing academic
- T. Namberumal Chetty (c. 1856–1925), Indian contractor, engineer, builder and businessman
- T. R. A. Thumboo Chetty (1837–1907), first Indian chief judge of the Chief Court of Mysore
- Trisha Chetty (born 1988), South Africa cricketer
