= Venkatesh Belvi =

Indian politician (1866–1962)

Dattatraya Venkatesh Belvi

Member of the Central Legislative Assembly
- In office 1924–1931
- Constituency: Bombay Southern Division

Member of the Bombay Legislative Council
- In office 20 December 1912 – 1921

Personal details
- Born: 14 January 1866
- Died: 4 April 1962 (aged 96) Belgaum, Mysore State (now Karnataka), India
- Party: Indian National Congress; Swaraj Party
- Occupation: Lawyer; Politician; Activist

Dattatraya Venkatesh Belvi (14 January 1866 – 4 April 1962) was an Indian politician and lawyer. He was a member of the Central Legislative Assembly between 1924 and 1931. He was known for his activism during the Home Rule movement in the Belgaum region under the wings of Bal Gangadhar Tilak.

== Early life ==
Belvi was born on 14 January 1866 into a "humble family". He was educated in Sardar's High School, Belgaum and Deccan College, Poona. Upon obtaining a degree in law from Government Law College, Bombay, he commenced practice as a lawyer in Belgaum in 1893, a profession he continued till 1944. His academic career was described as "[b]rilliant".

== Career ==
As member of the Indian National Congress, Belvi was elected to the Bombay Legislative Council in 1912 and retained the position till 1921 upon being elected a total of three times. During this time he was also involved in Tilak's Home Rule movement. He was appointed as member of the Executive Central Committee that was formed after the establishment of the League in 1916, as a representative of Belgaum. During this time, he worked as close associate of Gangadhar Rao Deshpande.

Belvi also held several positions such as member of the bar in the North Karnataka region, hitherto a part of the Bombay Presidency, and as president of the Belgaum municipality. He also served as director of the Belgaum District Central Co-operative Bank and Belgaum Pioneer Co-operative Bank, before serving as president of the Belgaum Central Library. At the 1923 general election, he was elected to the Central Legislative Assembly from the Swaraj Party. He was elected again and retained the position till 1931. Belvi died on 4 April 1962 in Belgaum, aged 96.

== See also ==
- Indian independence movement
