= Navshakti =

Marathi newspaper based in Mumbai, India

- Type: Daily
- Format: Broadsheet
- Owner: Indian National Press
- Publisher: Indian National Press
- Editor-in-chief: G. L. Lakhotia
- Editor: Sanjay Malme
- Founded: 1943
- Language: Marathi
- Headquarters: Mumbai
- Circulation: 83,910
- Sister newspapers: The Free Press Journal
- Website: marathi.freepressjournal.in
- Free online archives: epaper.navshakti.co.in

Navshakti is a Marathi-languagenewspaper based in Mumbai, India. The newspaper has a circulation of 83,910 across the state of Maharashtra. This paper was started by S. Sadanand. P. R. Behere was its first editor.

Indian Literature mentions Prabhakar Padhye, editor of Navshakti as a "formidable editor" whose "political and social writing" stood out in the context of the Marathi language.

== Bhatkyachi Bhramanti ==
Bhatkyachi Bhramanti (Journey of a tramp) was a weekly column by Pramod Navalkar. It ran for a record 52 years. It has found mention in Guinness World Records. Kiran Tare writing in the Daily News and Analysis informs that Navalkar was writing this column when he died. In this column Navalkar wrote about heads of criminal gangs, exposed gold smuggling, prostitution dens and bars. He used disguises to gain entry into exclusive brothels such as posing as an Arab to gain entry to a nude cabaret at Hotel Fariyas. Navalkar wrote free of charge.
