= T. S. Chockalingam =

Renowned Indian journalist, writer, and freedom fighter

- Born: 3 May 1899
- Died: 6 January 1966 (aged 66)

T. S. Chockalingam (3 May 1899 – 6 January 1966) was a pioneering Tamil journalist, writer, and advocate of Indian independence. During the pre-Independence period, his editorship of Dinamani accorded him the reputation as the dominant Tamil-language journalist of the 1930s and 1940s.

== Early life ==
Chockalingam was born in Tenkasi, Tirunelveli district, to Sankaralingam Pillai and Lakshmiyammal. He had three brothers and two sisters. His family owned a prominent general store named Madathukadai. After his father died, his brother Chidambaram Pillai managed the business. However, Chidambaram's arrest in the Ash Murder Case led Chockalingam to take over the store, which disrupted his education. His sister, Sornathammal, was married to P. Chockalingam of Ambasamudram, a prominent freedom fighter and communist..

== Career in journalism ==
He started at the Tamil Nadu magazine under P. Varadarajulu Naidu. By 1931, Chockalingam had launched the pioneering quarter anna magazine, Gandhi. He later co-founded the Manikkodi magazine with V. Ramaswami Iyengar and Stalin Srinivasan in 1933.

Chockalingam became the first editor of the Dinamani newspaper. In his inaugural editorial, he encouraged every Tamilian to take pride in their identity and to proudly call themselves Indian when outside Tamil Nadu. His tenure saw the involvement of prominent writers such as A. N. Sivaraman, Pudhumaipithan, C. S. Chellappa, and Ku. Alagirisami as assistant editors. He resigned from Dinamani in 1943 along with several colleagues.

In 1944, Chockalingam launched the daily newspaper Dinasari. Despite its challenges, he continued his journalistic pursuits by founding other publications, including Janayugam, Bharatham, and Navasakthi. In 1988, the Encyclopaedia of Indian Literature described Chockalingam as one of the most important nationalist journalists in Tamil.

== Congress politics ==
In 1937, Chockalingam was elected to the Legislative Assembly of the Madras Presidency as a member of the Congress party, representing Tenkasi constituency.

== Contributions to Tamil literature ==
Chockalingam introduced Pudhumaipithan, a pivotal Tamil writer. He provided Pudhumaipithan with opportunities across various publications he was involved with, including Dinamani, Manikkodi, and Dinasari. It is said that the translation of "War and Peace" by T.S.Chokkalingam has played a major role in forming the modern prose in Tamil.

=== Biographies ===
- Jawaharlal Nehru
- Vangam Thantha Singam on Subhas Chandra Bose
- Kamaraj

=== Short stories ===
- Alli Vijayam

== Death ==
Chockalingam died on 6 January 1966.
