= Free Press of India =

Indian nationalist-supporting news agency

- Industry: News media
- Founded: 1920s
- Founder: Swaminathan Sadanand
- Defunct: July, 1935
- Headquarters: India
- Key people: Swaminathan Sadanand

Free Press of India was an Indian nationalist-supporting news agency founded in the 1920s by Swaminathan Sadanand, during the period of the British Raj. It was the first news agency owned and managed by Indians. Beset by dubious business acumen from the outset, and beholden to those who financed it, the agency failed to obtain substantial support from Indian-owned press and hence closed down in 1935. It was revived briefly between 1945 and 1947 before being stifled by the government of the newly independent country. It was at various times a supporter of the Swaraj Party and, later, of the Responsive Cooperation Party, as well as various business interests.

== Background ==
In the three decades prior to independence of India, the Reuters news agency and its affiliates, such as the Associated Press of India (API), Eastern News Agency and Indian News Agency Service, had more or less complete control of newswire services in India. They supplied news services to the Government of the British Raj in that country, as well as from India to the international media, and vice versa. Sadanand had worked for API and left that arm of the Reuters monopoly soon after being dismayed by government suppression of reportage concerning the Jallianwala Bagh massacre of 1919. Thereafter, he worked for the Independent newspaper in Allahabad and then for the Rangoon Times in Burma, but he held a desire to break the monopoly, as did Gandhi and others involved in the Indian independence movement.

== Formation ==
The Free Press of India (FPI) was the first news agency in the country to be both owned and managed by Indians. Sadanand said that he had planned its creation in 1923 and that it was actually established in 1925. On the other hand, the First news agency in India was the Associated Press Of India (API), which began functioning in 1905 and was owned by Britishers. K. M. Shrivastava, a professor of news agency journalism, notes that Sadanand's account of the origins is one of several differing versions. Milton Israel notes late 1924, but also an announcement of the FPI office opening that was published by The Bombay Chronicle on 8 January 1925. (Note: The Free Press of India Agency became a limited company in March 1926, according to Milton Israel, but some sources place the date of establishment as late as 1927.) Sadanand had issued an appeal in September 1924, and earlier in that year he had approached Congress with his ideas and costings. His appeal noted that he proposed "An independent news agency that will collect and disseminate news with accuracy and impartiality from the Indian viewpoint [which is] a long-felt public want". One difficulty that would have to be surmounted, as the Chronicle noted, was that among all the various nationalist factions there was no common "Indian viewpoint"; Israel describes the extant monopoly as "efficient, dependable, and generally accurate". Another difficulty was to be the poor financial acumen of Sadanand, who envisaged that the FPI could be financially self-supporting by its second year of operation. Experienced newspaper businessmen, such as J. B. Petit and F. H. Holsinger, foresaw a much longer period of subsidy being required, as well as little chance of success because there were neither sufficient newspapers in print to justify another agency nor means to prevent the existing agencies from temporarily engaging in a price war to see off the new business. J. K. Singh was later to describe him as a great journalist but a poor business manager and a "sad failure".

Although Petit served briefly on the board of directors, he refused to invest. Others did provide funds and the FPI became beholden to its principal financial backers, being various businesses and political factions. The Swaraj Party was a major initial supporter but when one member, M. R. Jayakar, who was also a director of FPI, shifted his support from that to the Responsive Cooperation movement after October 1925, so too did the FPI. Other early board members included GD Birla and P. Thakurdas. Israel writes that the FPI since its establishment "had been run by a coalition of Bombay industrialists and journalists". A primary stimulus in the formation and growth of the nationalist-supporting FPI was probably the "rupee ratio" debate that pitted the colonial government against Indian nationalists. This debate concerned whether it was better to devalue the rupee or restrict the amount of rupees in circulation, together with the aim of maintaining a fixed ratio between the rupee and sterling of 1s. 6d. Any outcome of the debate would affect business but Israel also says that

It was clear from the beginning that the long term future of the FPI was going to be Sadanand's problem; and the willingness of his affluent backers to continue more than marginal philanthropy would depend on his success in becoming a stable competitor in the professional press world. They were never willing, however, to underwrite the high cost that might have made it possible to achieve that goal.

Sadanand was already aware of the constraints acting on the press as a result of the repressive laws of the British Empire. Newspapers could not carry factual reports of what Shrivastava calls "official excesses" even though FPI supplied them. To counteract this problem, he started his own newspaper, first as a cyclostyled news bulletin, the Free Press Bulletin, and finally The Free Press Journal on 13 June 1930. The Bulletin was a short-lived affair that had become a supplement to the Advocate of India Sunday newspaper as early as 1926, due to the inability to finance it as a standalone publication.

== Effect ==
The potential of the FPI as a new competitor was sufficient to cause the management at Reuters to institute various administrative changes in order to meet the perceived challenge. Sadanand claimed that the FPI "had the support of the entire national press of India while it was functioning. It maintained a comprehensive internal service. It was the first Indian news agency which organised and maintained an effective world news service to the press of India during the years 1932–35". Shrivastava notes that, despite Sadanand's own description, the venture was not a success and was not in fact supported by the press of India, however worthy his aims may have been. Sadanand was an affluent man and could afford to take risks, which was evidenced by his agency frequently forfeiting security deposits in acts of defiance, but the combined effects of a lack of general support, the opposition of the government of the British Raj and the vested interests of established news media caused it to close in 1935.

== Revival ==
The FPI was revived in 1945 and aimed then to provide feeds of international news to the Indian press, for which purpose it established correspondents in Batavia, Cairo, London, Nanking, New York and Singapore. The revival was abandoned in 1947 when the necessary teleprinter lines were denied to the organisation. The FPI had angered Sardar Patel, the Home Minister, by circulating a news story, on the day after independence of India, that revealed unauthorised details of military movements. Patel thereafter denied FPI the facilities that it needed in order to operate. Sadanand had hoped to resurrect the venture once more when the new government of the now-independent India had settled into place but in fact the FPI was not revived. Sadanand was one of the seven initial shareholders of the Press Trust of India, which was started in 1948.
