= P. I. Rajeev =

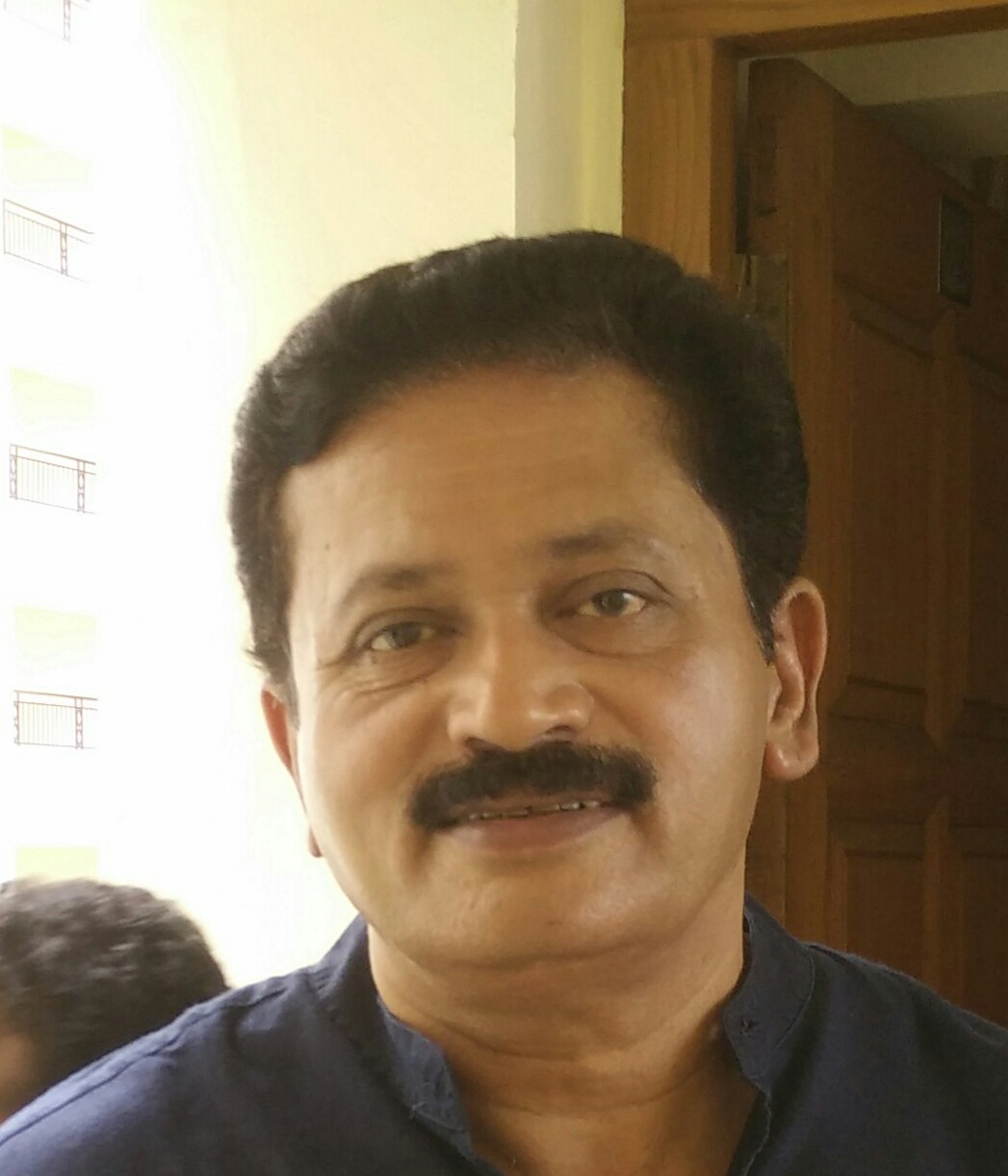
P. I. Rajeev

P. I. Rajeev is an Indian investigative journalist and columnist. He has written extensively for the Indian Express and India Today. former resident editor of The Hindu in Kerala. Now working as executive editor of Mathrubhumi Daily, Kerala.

Rajeev has also covered the communal riots in different parts of the country.

== Career ==
Rajeev from Kozhikode (Calicut) began his journalism career at the Free Press Journal in Mumbai in 1987 and later joined in Indore. He then moved to the Madhya Pradesh Chronicle as its features editor.

He shifted to the Indian Express in New Delhi in 1990. He was transferred to Kozhikode in 1993, but later took over as chief reporter in 1994. He was promoted as associate editor of New Indian Express Kochi in 2003.

Rajeev quit the New Indian Express and joined the Indian Express to improve its reportage in South India. He was senior editor of South India during 2005–2008. Later was made resident editor of Gujarat, where he served till 2011.

He was the resident editor of The Times of India at Central India for a brief period in 2011–12. Afterwards he joined as managing editor (South India) of India Today in 2012 and is now with The Hindu from June 2015.
