= Chockalingam =

Chockalingam is a given name and surname of Tamil origin. Notable people with the name include:

- G. Chockalingam (died 2000), Indian politician
- P. Chockalingam, Indian politician
- T. Chockalingam, Assistant Professor, Department of Civi Engineering, Ramco Institute of Technology, Rajapalayam.
- Mindy Kaling (born Vera Mindy Chockalingam in 1979), American actress, comedian, screenwriter, producer, director, and author
