= Avabai =

Avabai is a given name. Notable people with the name include:

- Avabai Jamsetjee Jeejeebhoy (c. 1793–?), benefactress of the Mahim causeway, wife of Jamsetjee Jeejeebhoy
- Avabai Bomanji Wadia (1913–2005), Ceylonese-born Indian social worker
