= Legislative Assembly of India =

Legislative Assembly of India may refer to:

- Central Legislative Assembly, the lower house of the Indian legislature from 1920 to 1946
- State legislative assemblies of India, the lower houses of the state legislature in present-day India.
