= The Southern India Mills Association =

- Abbreviation: SIMA
- Founder: R.K. Shanmukham Chetty
- Type: Non-governmental organization
- Headquarters: Coimbatore, India
- Region served: South India
- Official languages: English
- Chairman: M Senthilkumar
- Website: https://www.simamills.in/

The Southern India Mills Association, also known as the acronym SIMA, is a Textile mill association, which was established in 1933 at Coimbatore, India, by late Sir R.K. Shanmukham Chetty, the first finance minister of independent India, to represent the entire South Indian textile value chain.
