= Indian Legislative Assembly =

- Central Legislative Assembly
- State legislative assemblies of India
