= Kumar Sankar Ray =

Kumar Sankar Ray was born in 1882 and was a scion of the zamindar family of Teota (now in Bangladesh). Although initially trained as a barrister he never took up law as his profession. Instead, he entered politics as part of the Swarajya Party, founded by Chittaranjan Das and was elected to the Central Legislative Assembly on a Congress ticket. He was a member of the Council of State until his death in 1944. He was an elder cousin to the nationalist leader Kiran Sankar Roy.
