= Manikkodi =

Tamil non-fiction literary weekly publication

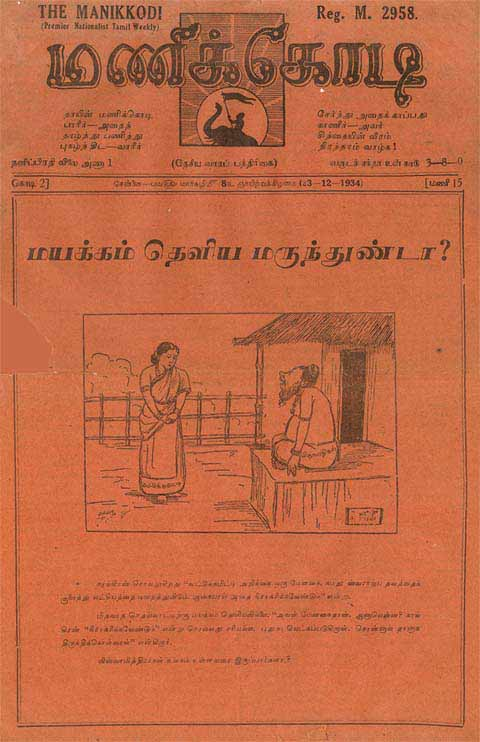
- Manikkodi issue dated 3 December 1934
- Editor-in-chief: Stalin Srinivasan
- Staff writers: P. G. Sundararajan, C. S. Chellappa, Puthumaipithan
- Categories: Non-fiction
- Frequency: Weekly
- First issue: 1933
- Final issue: 1939
- Country: British India
- Based in: Madras
- Language: Tamil

Manikkodi was a Tamil non-fiction literary weekly that was published from 1933 to 1939. Founded by Stalin Srinivasan, V. Ramaswami Iyengar and T. S. Chockalingam, the magazine was noted for its expertly-written articles by eminent authors like Swaminatha Athreya and gave birth to the Manikkodi Literary Movement. The magazine launched the careers of newcomers like C. S. Chellappa, Puthumaipithan, and Chitti who have earned acclaim as literary greats.
