= Abdur Rahim (judge) =

British Indian judge and politician

Sir Abdur Rahim KCSI
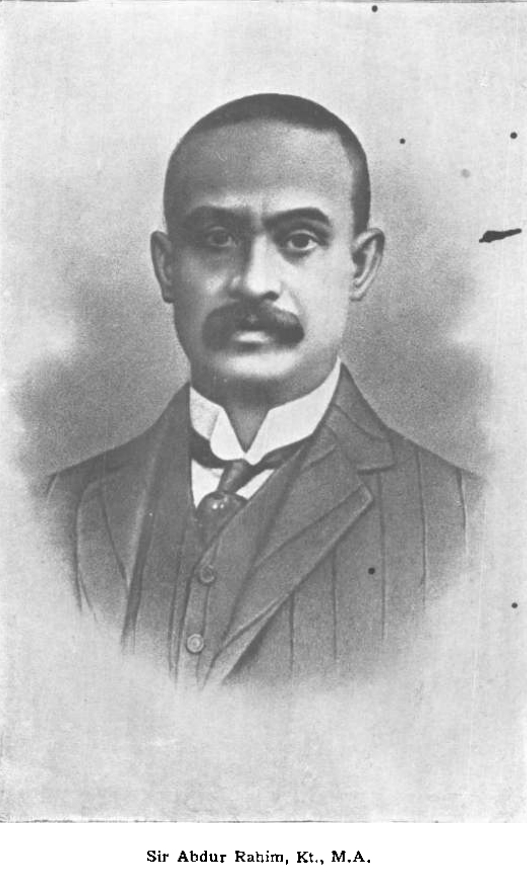

President of Central Legislative Assembly
- In office 24 January 1935 – 1 October 1945
- Preceded by: R. K. Shanmukham Chetty
- Succeeded by: Ganesh Vasudev Mavlankar

Member of Central Legislative Assembly
- In office 1930–1945
- Preceded by: Mohamed Rafique
- Constituency: Calcutta & Suburbs

Personal details
- Born: 7 September 1867 Midnapore, Bengal, British India.
- Died: 19 October 1952 (aged 85) Karachi, Sindh, Pakistan
- Party: All-India Muslim League; Bengal Muslim Party
- Children: Jalaludin Abdur Rahim; Begum Niaz Fatima
- Education: Presidency College, University of Calcutta

Sir Abdur Rahim, KCSI (7 September 1867 – 19 October 1952), sometimes spelled Abdul Rahim, was a judge and politician in British India and later in Pakistan, and a leading member of the All-India Muslim League. He was President of the Nikhil Banga Praja Samiti from 1929 to 1934 and of the Central Legislative Assembly of India from 1935 to 1945.

== Life ==

Rahim was born into a highly educated family of Bengal, the son of Mawlawi Abdur Rab, who was a Zamindar in the province's Midnapore district. Educated at Presidency College, Calcutta, and in England at the Inns of Court, he became a barrister of the Calcutta High Court in 1890, and later became a founding and influential member of the Muslim League.

Beyond his profession, Rahim was active in the world of education and became a member of the Senate and the Syndicate of the University of Madras. He was one of those who successfully promoted the foundation of the Maulana Azad College.

On 20 July 1908, Rahim was appointed a Judge of the High Court of Judicature at Madras, and in September 1912 (with Lord Islington, Lord Ronaldshay, Herbert Fisher, and others) as a member of the Royal Commission on the Public Services in India of 1912–1915.

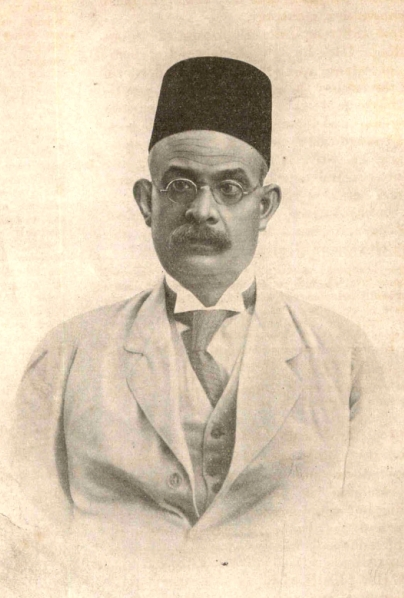

Rahim went on to become Chief Justice of the High Court of Madras and Tagore Professor of Law in the University of Calcutta. In the 1919 Birthday Honours, he was knighted.

While he was still a judge of the High Court of Madras, Rahim gave a series of lectures at the University of Calcutta which were later published under the title The Principles of Muhammadan Jurisprudence according to the Hanafi, Maliki, Shafi'i, and Hanbali Schools. This work considers some recent European books on philosophy and law and compares the Islamic and European principles of jurisprudence, combining classical and modern learning.

Entering politics, he became a member of the Bengal Province Executive Council and served as the province's Administrator of Justice and Allied Subjects from 1921 to 1925.

In the 1925 Birthday Honours, Rahim was appointed a Knight Commander of the Order of the Star of India (KCSI).

In December 1925 and January 1926, Rahim chaired the 17th session of the All-India Muslim League at Aligarh, when he said –

The Hindus and Muslims are not two religious sects like the Protestants and Catholics of England, but form two distinct communities of peoples, and so they regard themselves... the fact that they have lived in the same country for nearly 1,000 years has contributed hardly anything to their fusion into a nation... Any of us Indian Muslims travelling in Afghanistan, Persia, Central Asia, among Chinese Muslims, Arabs, and Turks would at once be made at home and would not find anything to which we are not accustomed. On the contrary in India we find ourselves in all social matters aliens when we cross the street and enter that part of the town where our fellow townsmen live.

In 1926, he presided over the All-India Mohammadan Educational Conference and argued for the use of the Urdu language among all Indian Muslims. The Hindu leaders became hostile to Rahim, and when in 1927 the Governor of Bengal offered him a place in the Provincial government, the Hindus refused to work with him.

Also in 1926, he formed a political party called the Bengal Muslim Party. The Modern Review commented:

For any Muslim, and particularly for Sir Abdur Rahim, to form such a party cannot surprise anybody. But what is amusing is that he has felt it necessary to camouflage it as something other than what it is. For the party speaks in the opening paragraph of its manifesto in the most liberal and nonsectarian tones.

In 1928, Rahim was the president of the Bengal Muslim Conference which opposed the Nehru Report, and in 1930 of the Bengal Muslim Conference which opposed the proposals of the Simon Commission.

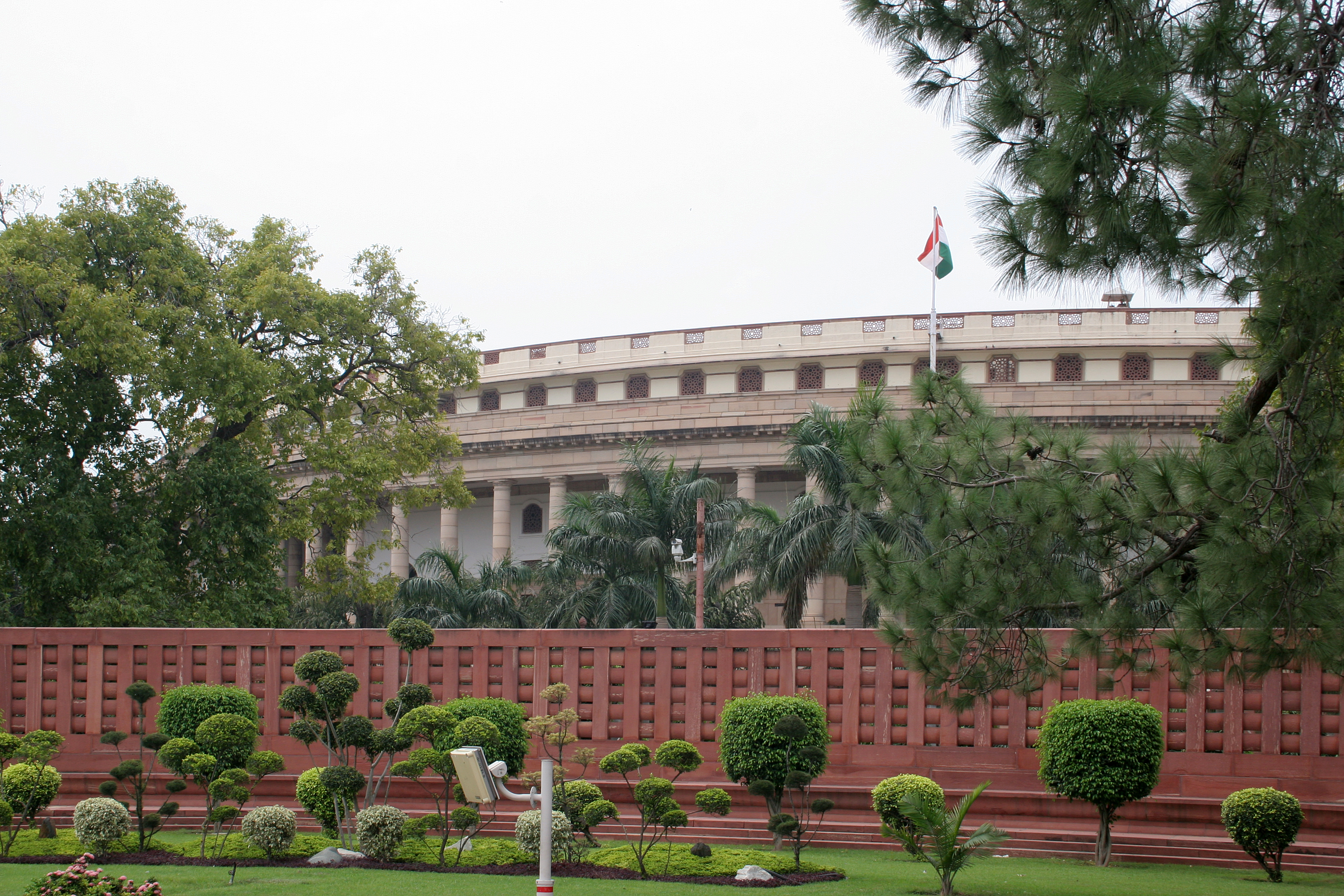
Parliament Building in New Delhi, home of the Central Legislative Assembly, now of the Parliament of India

From 1929 to 1934, he was President of the Nikhil Banga Praja Samiti, or All Bengal Tenant Association.

In 1931, he was elected to the Central Legislative Assembly of India, and while Mohammad Ali Jinnah was overseas for the Round Table Conferences, Rahim led the Independent Party. On 24 January 1935, he was elected as the assembly's president, which effectively ended his public involvement in partisan politics, but he retained strong views on the interests of Muslim Indians. He served as president of the Central Legislative Assembly from 1935 until 1945.

A member of the Indian Military College Committee, Rahim was sometimes skeptical of British policy. He was also opposed to recruiting men from outside India into the Indian Army, such as the Gurkhas, which he described as "absolutely an anti-Indian policy".

In June 1939, the Viceroy, Lord Linlithgow, wrote to the Secretary of State for India, Lord Zetland, after sounding out Rahim on Muslim attitudes towards the proposed Federation of India –

I had not anticipated that he would be anything but right wing; but I was, I confess, a little surprised by the extreme communal vigour of his views and by the conviction with which he maintained that his co-religionists now stood, as he put it, with their backs to the wall and must fight.

In October 1939, with Sir Abdullah Haroon, Rahim visited Allama Mashriqi, leader of the Khaksars, shortly after his release from jail.

In 1946, Rahim donated his collection of 333 Arabic books, mostly on religion, to the Imperial Library (now the National Library of India), where they are known as the Sir Abdur Rahim Collection.

After moving to Pakistan in 1947, he settled in Karachi, where he died of pneumonia in 1952.

His daughter Begum Niaz Fatima married the barrister Huseyn Shaheed Suhrawardy (1892–1963), who later became the fifth Prime Minister of Pakistan, while his son Jalaludin Abdur Rahim was a Nietzschean philosopher and one of the founders of the Pakistan People's Party.

== Publications ==
- Rahim, Abdur (1911). The Principles of Muhammadan Jurisprudence according to the Hanafi, Maliki, Shafi'i and Hanbali Schools (PDF). London: Luzac & Co.
