= Bhatkyachi Bhramanti =

Bhatkyachi Bhramanti (Journey of a tramp) was a weekly column by Pramod Navalkar using the pen name of "Bhatkya" in the Sunday edition of Navshakti that ran for a time-span of 52 years. It was first published on 2 December, 1956. The time-span of the column has found a mention in Limca Book of Records.

In the column, Navalkar wrote about criminal gangs, gold smuggling rackets, prostitution dens, barmaids and other societal malices (in his opinion), often using disguises to gain entry into exclusive areas. Navalkar wrote free of charge. The column exposed shocking aspects of Mumbai's nightlife.

Ashish Rajadhyaksha is quoted in a doctoral thesis describing this column as an example of "territorial realism".
