= Janardan Thakur =

Indian editor and reporter (1936–1999)

Janardan Thakur (March 1, 1936 – July 12, 1999) was a veteran editor, political reporter and columnist. He was also the former editor of English-language daily newspaper, The Free Press Journal. As an author, he is most known for his book, All The Prime Minister’s Men (1977), which is considered a classic in political writing as well as on the Emergency period and All the Janata Men (1978).

== Career ==
Born March 1, 1936 in Bihar, Thakur started his career with the Patna-based daily newspaper, Searchlight, in December 1959. Later, he remained a Jefferson Fellow at the East–West Center, Hawaii in 1971. He joined the Ananda Bazar Patrika group in 1976, and subsequently in the 1980s, he started freelancing and went on to become a syndicated columnist. He remained political journalist with the magazine, The Illustrated Weekly Of India and The Asian Age. In 1990s, he moved to Mumbai and became the editor of newspaper, The Free Press Journal.

He also authored books like All the Prime Minister's Men after the Emergency; All the Janata Men; V.P. Singh: A Quest for Power, PMs: Nehru to Vajpayee and Faces: Forty in the Fray.

== Personal life ==
On July 12, 1999, at the age of 64, he died of a heart attack in Mumbai (then Bombay). He was survived by his wife, Purnima, daughters Chitra, Pooja and Richa, and son Sankarshan Thakur, national editor of the newspaper, The Telegraph.

== Books ==
- All The Prime Minister’s Men . Vikas Publishing. 1977. ISBN 9780706905663.
- All the Janata Men. Vikas Publishing. 1978. ISBN 9780706906448.
- Indira Gandhi and Her Power Game. Vikas Publishing. 1979. ISBN 9780706909852
- V.P. Singh: The Quest for Power. Warbler Books. 1989.
- Prime Ministers: Nehru to Vajpayee (with Dom Moraes). Eshwar. 1999. ISBN 9788186982723.
- Faces: Forty in the Fray. 1999. Business Publications Incorporated. ISBN 9788176930185.
