= Sir Jamsetjee Jejeebhoy, 3rd Baronet =

Sir Jamsetjee Jeejebhoy, 3rd Baronet
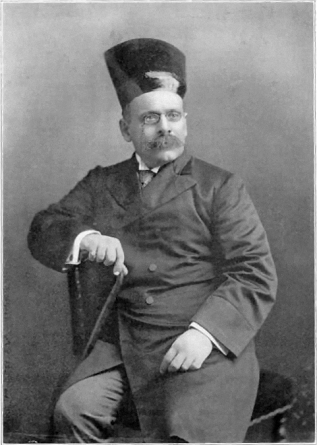
- Sir Jamsetjee Jeejeebhai, 3rd Baronet. Source:The National Geographic Magazine, Dec 1905
- Born: Menekjee Cursatjee; 3 March 1851
- Died: 16 July 1898 (aged 47)

Sir Jamsetjee Jeejebhoy, 3rd Baronet, CSI, (3 March 1851 – 16 July 1898) was an Indian businessman.

Born Menekjee Cursatjee, he was the eldest son of Sir Jamsetjee Jeejeebhoy, the second baronet. His son inherited the baronetcy from his father in 1877. Jeejebhoy enjoyed the advantages of an English education, and continued the career of benevolent activity and loyalty to British rule which had been the theme of his father and grandfather's life. His public service was recognised by his nomination to the Order of the Star of India, as well as by appointment to the Legislative Councils of Calcutta and Bombay. In 1881, he visited King Kalākaua of Hawaii on the monarch's world tour, while he was in Bombay. Upon his death in 1898 at age 47, his title was inherited by his younger brother, Cowsajee.

Baronetage of the United Kingdom
Preceded by Jamsetjee Jejeebhoy	Baronet (of Bombay); 1877–1898	Succeeded by Cowsajee Jejeebhoy
