= Marathi Granth Sangrahalaya =

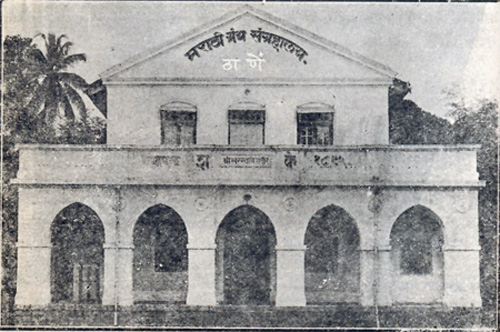
- Marathi Granth Sangrahalaya
- Location: Thane, Maharashtra, India, India
- Type: Public library
- Established: 1 June 1893

Other information
- Website: Official website

Marathi Granth Sangrahalaya (MGS) is a public library located in Thane, Maharashtra, India. It was founded on 1 June 1893. It is one of the oldest Marathi libraries in India.

== History ==
Marathi Granth Sangrahalaya was established on 1 June 1893, by Vinayak Laxman Bhave, a 22-year-old man, along with his friends Vishnu Bhaskar and Baba Patwardhan. It was the first public Marathi library in Thane district. On the day of its establishment, the library received 40 subscribers, and by the end of the year, the number of subscribers had gone up to 172. The library started with 76 books and had 598 books by the end of the year.

The library had run a magazine called Maharashtra Kavi from 1904 to 1908 under the editorship of Vinayak Laxman Bhave. The magazine published works of many poets from the 13th century to the 18th century. In 1944, the golden jubilee of the organization was celebrated under the chairmanship of Narasimha Chintaman Kelkar, alias Tatyasaheb Kelkar. On 8 February 1953, the 13th Literary Week of Marathi Granth Sangrahalaya was inaugurated by freedom activist Vinayak Damodar Savarkar. The 42nd Akhil Bharatiya Marathi Sahitya Sammelan was held in Thane in 1960 as an initiative of Marathi Granth Sangrahalaya. In 2014, the mobile book library was started by Marathi Granth Sangrahalaya. In June 2017, on its 120th anniversary, it installed a digital kiosk, which offers books in digital and audio formats.

== Building ==
The first building of Marathi Granth Sangrahalaya was constructed in 1930 in Kharkar Ali, Thane. The new library building was inaugurated on 21 April 1964, by the then Defense Minister of India, Yashwantrao Chavan and Datto Vaman Potdar. At the same time, the organization got the status of a district library.

== Collection ==
Marathi Granth Sangrahalaya has more than 1,700 books. It has a collection of old magazines, including Kerala Kokil, Kayastha Mitra, Paisa Fund, Dharmajagruti, Kirloskar, and Anand. A project of digitization has also been started to make the bibliography accessible to more readers digitally.

== Membership ==
It had 3,000 to 4,000 members before COVID-19. The membership decreased after COVID-19. The membership of Marathi Granth Sangrahalaya is ₹1,000 per month since April 2018.

== Election ==
In the triennial election of Marathi Granth Sangrahalaya, Vidyadhar Thanekar, a writer and publisher won as the president in September 2021.
