= The Free Press Journal =

Indian broadsheet newspaper

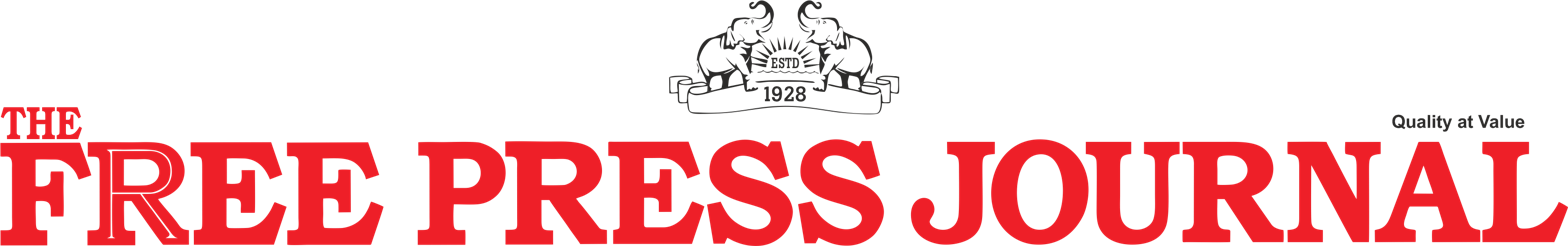

- Front page of the Mumbai edition of The Free Press Journal (30 October 2024)
- Type: Daily Newspaper
- Format: Broadsheet
- Publisher: Indian National Press Bombay Pvt. Ltd.
- Editor: V Sudarshan
- Managing editor: G. L. Lakhotia
- Founded: 1928
- Language: English
- Headquarters: Free Press House, Free Press Journal Marg, 215, Nariman Point, Mumbai 400021
- Circulation: 154,000
- Sister newspapers: Navshakti
- Website: freepressjournal.in

The Free Press Journal is an Indian English-language daily newspaper that was established in 1928 by Swaminathan Sadanand, who also acted as its first editor. First produced to complement a news agency, the Free Press of India, it was a supporter of the Independence movement. It is published in Mumbai, India.

== History ==
The founder editor was Swaminathan Sadanand. It was founded in 1928 to support Free Press of India, a news agency that dispatched "nationalist" news to its subscribers. In the colonial context, Colaco describes it as "an independent newspaper supporting nationalist causes". She quotes Lakshmi as saying that "The nationalist press marched along with the freedom fighters". It played a significant role in mobilising sympathetic public opinion during the independence movement.

== Notable former employees ==
Among its founders was Stalin Srinivasan who founded Manikkodi in 1932. Bal Thackeray worked as a cartoonist for the newspaper until being removed from the job. Thackeray then founded Marmik. According to Stephen E. Atkins he was removed "after a political dispute over Thackeray's attacks on southern Indian immigration into Bombay" Notable cartoonist R. K. Laxman joined The Free Press Journal as a twenty-year-old. He was Thackeray's colleague. Three years into the job, he was asked by his proprietor not to make fun at communists, Laxman left and joined The Times of India.

== Support to Jewish refugee medical doctors ==
It supported the practice rights of Jewish doctors who had taken refuge in Mumbai fleeing persecution in Germany, in the 1930s. Indian doctors opposed their right to practice claiming that Germany did not have reciprocal arrangements for Indian doctors. The Free Press Journal argued that this was against the "ancient Indian traditions of affording shelter from persecution".

== Columnists ==
- Seema Mustafa: Seema Mustafa is a Resident Editor for The Sunday Guardian. She writes a column "Frankly Speaking Seema Mustafa".
- Janardan Thakur: veteran political columnist was editor of the newspaper in the late 1990s.

== See also ==
- Navshakti
