= Responsive Cooperation Party =

Indian Independence Party

The Responsive Cooperation Party was a political party operating in the Indian independence movement and was established by M. R. Jayakar, B. S. Moonje, N. C. Kelkar and others. The party was a splinter from the Motilal Nehru-led Swaraj Party, which was further split by the formation of the Independent Congress Party and the Nationalist Party. The Responsive Cooperationists had become opposed to the concept of non-cooperation with the government of the British Raj and Jayakar's move away from the Swaraj Party was evident by October 1925. The concept of responsive cooperation predates the party and was coined by Joseph Baptista, before being taken up by Bal Gangadhar Tilak, of whom Kelkar was a follower, around 1919.

== Background ==
Bal Gangadhar Tilak, an Indian independence activist, favoured the religious belief system known as Advaitism and from this held the view that people had a divine right to freedom because their souls were identical to that of God rather than distinct from it. If the spiritual potential of people is to be achieved then they must be free to seek it, express it and live it, and the colonial presence of the British in India denied such freedom because it made them subservient to a bureaucracy. He wrote a newspaper article, published by Kesari, that countered the argument that the British government was constitutional by noting that in India there was no social contract whereby the government and the governed shared mutual obligations, and where the former was accountable to the latter. His notion of swarajya was simultaneously a religious and a political concept that was intended to address these issues. Attainment of swaraj - the rule of the people rather than a bureaucracy — was also a prerequisite for any other changes, such as social reforms or the pursuit of economic adjustments.

It was proposed by Tilak that the practical implementation of swaraj would be achieved by adopting a four-point programme (chatuhsutri) of boycott, swadeshi (purchase of local goods rather than produce from abroad), education and passive resistance. Adi Hormusji Doctor has noted of the last of these, which Tilak first proposed at the Benares Congress, that although it was Mahatma Gandhi who later popularised the idea, "to Tilak goes the credit of being the first to conceive its enormous potentialities." Tilak toned down his rhetoric from 1916, emphasising that his concern was the bureaucracy rather than the British monarch, and seeking British citizenship for Indian people. Together with Annie Besant and others, he formed the All India Home Rule League and then, in 1919, he voiced the idea of responsive cooperation - a term originally coined by Joseph Baptista, and a concept that Tilak described as a "divine revelation" - whereby he thought that the Indian people would cooperate with British reforms if the British were willing to cooperate with the Indians in return. His point was made in relation to the proposed Montagu–Chelmsford Reforms, which were also the tipping point for Gandhi, who reversed his own position to one of non-cooperation. In 1920, shortly before his death, Tilak proposed to contest elections through the vehicle of his newly formed Congress Democratic Party and this, too, had aims consistent with his previously stated philosophy.

In 1921 the British authorities tired of dealing with the demands of Congress and the satyagrahas: they classified Congress as an illegal body and imprisoned leaders such as Gandhi, Jawaharlal Nehru and Lajpat Rai, as well as arresting numerous other activists within the nationalist movement. Amid the subsequent internal dissension within Congress, Motilal Nehru and Chittaranjan Das formed a Swaraj group that, between 1923 and 1927, existed as the Swaraj Party. This organisation was split almost from the outset, with the dispute reflecting the wider strategic differences regarding the choice between adopting a stance of non-cooperation or responsive cooperation.

== Formation ==
From the fractured Swaraj Party emerged the Responsive Cooperation Party, the Independent Congress Party and the Nationalist Party, all of which favoured responsivism. The first two of these were formed just prior to the 1926 elections and went on to rout the Swaraj Party and Congress in North India in those elections.

Bhatt notes that it is

... striking that the major figures involved in the national movement who opposed absolute non-cooperation - Lajpat Rai, Madan Mohan Malaiviya and B. S. Moonje - were also important in the by then burgeoning and militant Hindu nationalist organisations that existed within and outside the Indian National Congress.

Moonje was particularly involved with the recently formed Rashtriya Swayamsevak Sangh.

Gangadhar Birla was among the supporters of the Responsivists in the mid-1920s, as was the Hindu Mahasabha and the Independent Congress Party, now led by Madan Mohan Malaviya.
