= Stalin Srinivasan =

Indian journalist

- Born: Kuppuswami Srinivasan; 30 May 1899; Shiyali, Tanjore District, Madras Presidency
- Died: 2 June 1975 (aged 76)
- Education: Presidency College, Madras
- Occupation: Journalist
- Known for: Founding Manikodi

Kuppuswami Srinivasan (30 May 1899 – 2 June 1975), popularly known as Stalin Srinivasan, was an Indian journalist and Indian independence activist who founded the journal Manikodi in 1932. He was also one of the founders of the Free Press Journal. Upon India's independence, he served as the first chief film censor of Madras state. Acclaimed civil lawyer Radha Srinivasan is Stalin Srinivasan's daughter.

== Early life ==
Srinivasan was born on 30 May 1899 at Shiyali in the Tanjore district of Madras Presidency, India. He graduated in law and was pursuing his post-graduate studies at the Presidency College, Madras when he was invited by C. Rajagopalachari to join the staff of the National School that he had founded.

== Career ==
Srinivasan worked for the Daily Press and Swarajya before joining S. Sadanand's The Free Press Journal in Bombay. He served notably as the Central Assembly Correspondent in Delhi and covered the proceedings of the C. Sankaran Nair committee in London. When Sadanand was jailed for publishing an article by Srinivasan, the latter went to court to get Sadanand released.

In 1932, along with a few of his friends, Srinivasan started the Tamil journal Manikkodi. Manikkodi would acquire acclaim as a journal and spearhead a literary movement.
