= Chitti (writer) =

Indian writer

Periyakulam Govindaswamy Sundararajan (pen name: Chitti) (20 April 1910 – 23 June 2006) was an Indian writer who was associated with the Manikodi. At the time of his death in 2006, he was the last surviving contributor to the Manikodi magazine.
