= Swaminatha Athreya =

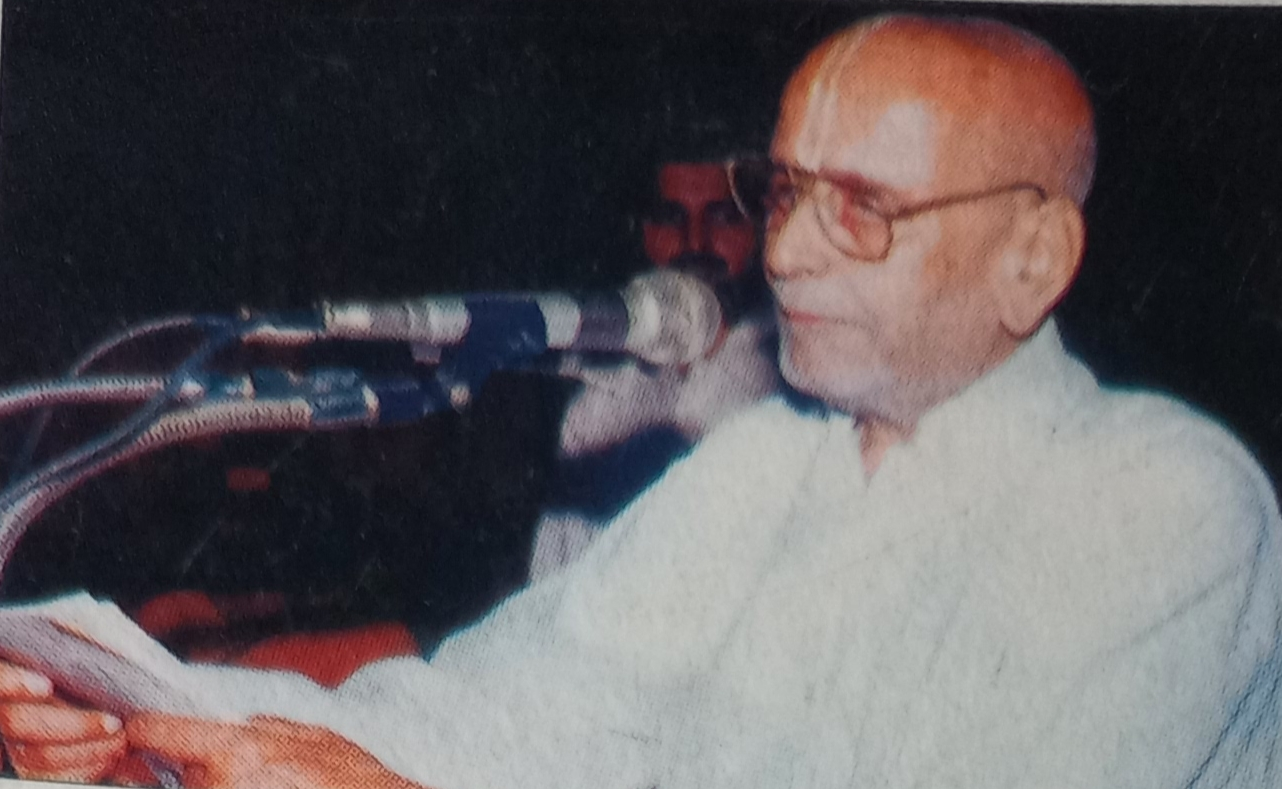
- Swaminatha Athreya during an event
- Born: Thanjavur
- Baptised: 19 November 1919
- Died: 19 December 2013 (aged 94); Thanjavur
- Occupation: Author
- Years active: c. 1935–2010
- Era: Manikodi
- Father: Simizhi Venkatrama Sasthri

Swaminatha Athreya (also called Swaminathan Athreya or Swaminathan Athreyar or Athreyan) (9 November 1919 – 19 December 2013) was a Vedic scholar and writer of Hindu divine literature in Sanskrit and Tamil. He was based out of Thanjavur, a town in the South Indian state of Tamil Nadu. He was born in Simizhi and had his early tutelage in Sanskrit under his father Simizhi Venkatrama Sasthri. He went on to learn Sanskrit in Annamalai University.

Athreyar associated himself with Kanchi Mutt, a South Indian monastic institution. His major works include the Tamil translation of Bhagavad Gita, Thyagaraja Anubavangal and Samartha Ramadasar. He was honoured with several awards like "Asukavi Thilagam" and "Veda Sri" for his extensive works in Sanskrit and Tamil. He is considered one of the prominent composers of Sanskrit Nirupanas that include the likes of Jagannatha Pandita, Chitrakavi Sivaramakrishna Bhagavatar, Mangudi Saptarishi Bhagavatar, Harikesavanallur Muthiah Bhagavatar and Thanjavur Sundaresa Sarma. He died on 19 December 2013 in his premises due to ailments related to old age.

== Early life ==
Athreyar was born on 19 November 1919 in Simizhi, a village in the Thanjavur district in the South Indian state of Tamil Nadu. His father Simizhi Venkatrama Sasthri was a famed Sanskrit scholar and orator. Athreyar started his initial Sanskrit tutelage on Sastras, Ramayana and historical Puranas under his father. He enhanced his knowledge in Sanskrit in Annamalai University. He translated the works of Srinivasa Sastri in Sanskrit and got his appreciation. He later associated himself with Kanchi Mutt under the aegis of the then pontiff Chandrashekarendra Saraswati. He started his works on various Sanskrit and Tamil literature during the association with the Mutt.

== Works ==
Swaminatha Athreyar has translated the Bhagavat Gita published by Gita Press. The translation is the first comprehensive translation for Gita in Tamil and has influence of Sanskrit language. His book on Samarth Ramdas is a research publication on Ramdasar and his association with King Shivaji. In 2004, he compiled Narayana Tirthar Charithram, a book on Narayana Tirthar. He has authored and compiled many works of the Saraswathi Mahal Library in Thanjavur. Sri Tyagaraja Anubhavangal is a collection of 12 short stories written over a period of years, that narrates specific incidents that gave birth to different compositions. His other works include Bhaktha Rama Samrajyam, Nama Samrajyam, Srirama Mathuri, Ramanamam, Thyagaraja Anubavangal, Athreya Lagu Lega Mala, Jaya Jaya Hanuman and translation of Siva Leelavarnam.

== Honours ==
He is considered one of the prominent composers of Sanskrit Nirupanas that include Jagannatha Pandita, Chitrakavi Sivaramakrishna Bhagavatar, Mangudi Saptarishi Bhagavatar, Harikesavanallur Muthiah Bhagavatar and Thanjavur Sundaresa Sarma. As per his views, for historic novels, the author should concentrate on incident and characters rather than putting their personal perspectives.

Athreyar was honoured with "Asukavi Thilagam" by Kanchi Kamakoti Peetham during 1963 by the then pontiff Chandrashekarendra Saraswati. He was also appointed as the "Asthana Vithuvan" (or chief poet) of the Mutt. Athreyar has been honoured with Agavithilagam award. The Sahitya Parishad honoured him with Sahidi Vallabha award. Krishna Sweets conferred him with Gnana Semmal award on 1 January 2010. The World Veda Foundation conferred him with "Veda Sri" Based on his works in Sanskrit, the former Minister of Human Resource Development, Dr. Murli Manohar Joshi, conferred Athreyar the "Rashtriya Samskritha Samasthana Moola" award.
