= Sir Jamsetjee Jejeebhoy, 4th Baronet =

Indian baronet (1852–1908)

Sir Jamsetjee Jejeebhoy, 4th Baronet, (25 November 1852 – 17 June 1908) was an Indian businessman.

Born Cowasjee Cursatjee, he was the son of Sir Jamsetjee Jejeebhoy, the second baronet. Jejeebhoy inherited the baronetcy from his brother, Menekjee.

It was the fourth Baronet who came to be viewed as the leader of the Parsi community throughout the world. He was a well-known Bombay businessman, and in 1902 was chosen to represent the city at the Coronation of King Edward VII and Queen Alexandra.

On Jejeebhoy's death, his title was inherited by his eldest son, Rustomjee.

Baronetage of the United Kingdom
Preceded by Jamsetjee Jejeebhoy	Baronet (of Bombay); 1898–1908	Succeeded by Rustomjee Cowsajee Jamsethee Jejeebhoy
