= P. Chockalingam =

Indian politician

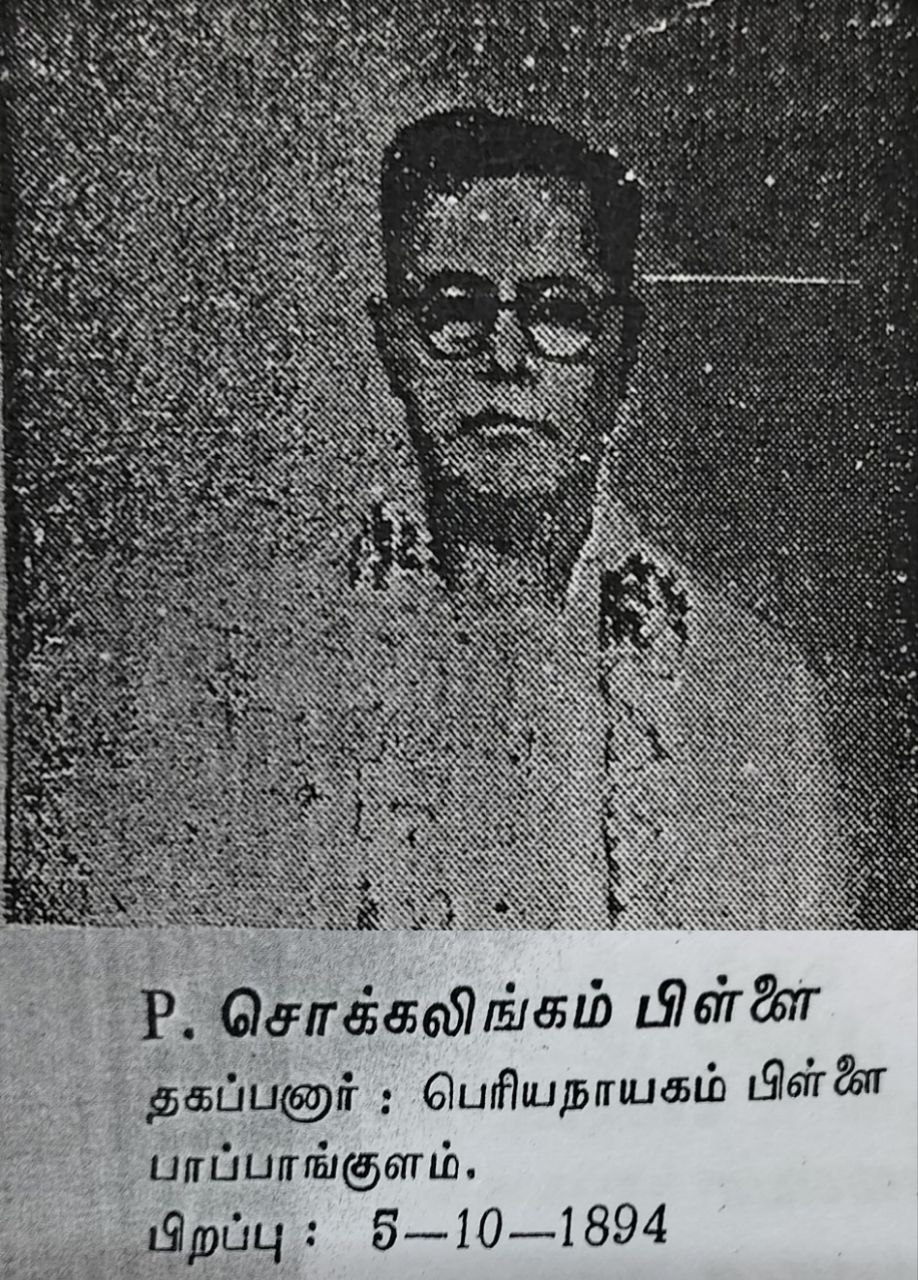

Member of the Madras State Assembly
- In office 1952–1957
- Preceded by: Lakshmi Sankara Iyer
- Constituency: Ambasamudram

Freedom Fighter

Communist

Personal details
- Born: 05-10-1894
- Died: September 1959
- Citizenship: India
- Party: Independent politician
- Spouse: Sornathammal
- Relations: Brother in Law T.S Chokkalingam Pillai (Journalist, Writer, Freedom Fighter)
- Children: 4 Sons and 2 Daughters
- Parent: Periyanayagam Pillai
- Occupation: Freedom Fighter, Communist

P. Chockalingam (5 October 1894 – September 1959) was an Indian freedom fighter, socialist leader, and political activist from Tamil Nadu. A prominent figure in the Indian independence movement and later in labour and farmers' struggles in the Tirunelveli region. Known for his fiery oratory, deep compassion for the oppressed, and progressive ideals, Chokkalingam Pillai played a vital role in shaping left-leaning mass movements in South Tamil Nadu.He was elected to the Tamil Nadu legislative assembly as an Independent candidate from Ambasamudram constituency in 1952 election.

== Early life and background ==
P. Chockalingam was born on 5 October 1894 in Pappankulam, a village in Ambasamudram Taluk, Tirunelveli district, Tamil Nadu. His father, Periya Nayagam Pillai, was a landlord. He married Sornathammal, sister of the renowned journalist, writer, and freedom fighter T. S. Chockalingam Pillai. Another of his brothers-in-law was Chidambaram Pillai, who was imprisoned for one year for his involvement in the Ashe murder case. His brother P. Muthaiah Pillai was elected as a Member of Parliament in the 1962 Lok Sabha elections.

== Role in the Freedom Struggle ==
Influenced by V. O. Chidambaram Pillai (VOC) and close to Subramania Bharati (Bharathiyar), Chockalingam became an early participant in the Indian freedom struggle. During the Non-Cooperation Movement in 1922, he led protests and was arrested, spending a year in Cuddalore Jail.

He gained popularity for his moving speeches about British atrocities, especially the Jallianwala Bagh massacre, which brought many into the national movement. He had a natural gift for oratory, and his public speeches were often emotional and persuasive.

A staunch supporter of the poor and working class, he aligned with the leftist faction of the Indian National Congress, promoting socialist ideas within the party.

== Labour and Farmers' Movement ==
In 1938, Chockalingam organized a historic 90-day strike at the Harvey Mills in V.K. Puram, alongside leaders like Sindhipoonthurai Shanmugam Pillai, Kallidaikurichi Gomathi Shankar Theetchidar, and Alwarkurichi Tirumalai Kolundhu Pillai. He collected food, clothing, and funds for striking workers and became active in the Congress Socialist Party.

Over time, he gravitated toward communist ideology and was arrested in 1940 under the Defence of India Act. He was detained as a political prisoner and held for four years in Vellore Central Jail, until his release in 1944. During his imprisonment, he came into close contact with prominent communist leaders and deepened his commitment to socialist and pro-labour causes. Despite the extended incarceration and the resulting financial ruin and social hardships faced by his family, Chockalingam remained steadfast in his activism and returned to public life with renewed dedication to the struggles of workers and peasants.

He helped form farmer unions in Kodarangulam, Ambur, and Kankeyanallur, and convened a major peasant conference at Kodarangulam. He later held the positions of Vice President of the Tamil Nadu Farmers' Union and President of the Tirunelveli District Farmers' Union.

During the 1947 crackdown on communists following the arrests of Meenakshinathan, Nallasivan, and Sreenivasan, Chockalingam was again imprisoned, only to be released shortly before India's independence. In 1948, he was arrested once more and released the following year.

== Death and legacy ==
Chockalingam died in September 1959. He is remembered for his unwavering dedication to the freedom struggle, his grassroots leadership in labour and farmers’ movements, and his contributions to socialist politics in Tamil Nadu. His views remained strongly socialist and pro-labour. In the Assembly, he consistently raised issues related to farmers, labour rights, and rural development. His legacy lives on through the causes he championed and the generations of activists he inspired.
