= Sylvie Chetty =

New Zealand marketing academic

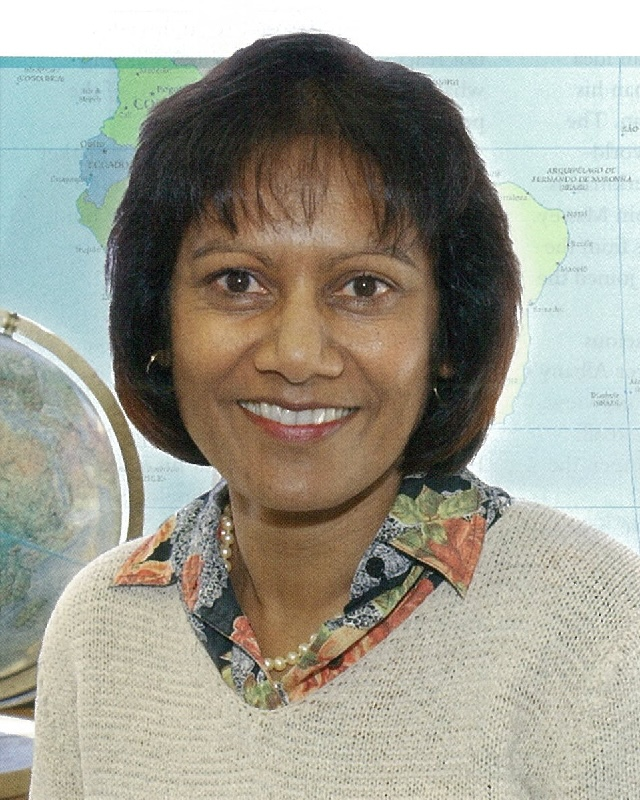
- Chetty in 2005
- Other name: Kamala Chetty

Academic background
- Education: University of Canterbury
- Thesis: International trade performance of New Zealand manufacturing: An industry and enterprise-level study (1993)

Academic work
- Discipline: Marketing
- Institutions: Massey University; University of Otago

Sylvie Kamala Chetty is a New Zealand marketing academic, and as of 2019 is a full professor at the University of Otago.

== Academic career ==
After a 1993 PhD titled 'International trade performance of New Zealand manufacturing: An industry and enterprise-level study' at the University of Canterbury, Chetty moved to Massey University, rising to full professor and then the University of Otago.

== Selected works ==
- Chetty, Sylvie, and Desiree Blankenburg Holm. "Internationalisation of small to medium-sized manufacturing firms: a network approach." International business review 9, no. 1 (2000): 77–93.
- Chetty, Sylvie. "The case study method for research in small-and medium-sized firms." International small business journal 15, no. 1 (1996): 73–85.
- Chetty, Sylvie, and Colin Campbell-Hunt. "A strategic approach to internationalization: a traditional versus a “born-global” approach." Journal of International marketing 12, no. 1 (2004): 57-81.
- Chetty, Sylvie K., and Robert T. Hamilton. "Firm-level determinants of export performance: a meta-analysis." International Marketing Review 10, no. 3 (1993).
- Chetty, Sylvie, and Colin Campbell-Hunt. "Paths to internationalisation among small-to medium-sized firms: a global versus regional approach." European journal of marketing 37, no. 5/6 (2003): 796–820.
- Chetty, Sylvie K., and Heather IM Wilson. "Collaborating with competitors to acquire resources." International Business Review 12, no. 1 (2003): 61–81.
