= Sami Venkatachalam Chetty =

Indian politician

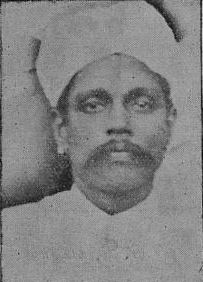
Sami Venkatachalam Chetty in 1920s

Sami Venkatachalam Chetty (died 17 November 1958) was an Indian politician, businessman and Indian independence activist who served as a member of the Madras Legislative Council and Imperial Legislative Council of India, as well as President of the Madras Corporation. He is largely known for his surprise victory over Assembly Speaker R. K. Shanmukham Chetty in the 1934 elections to the Imperial Legislative Council.

== Career ==
Chetty joined the Indian National Congress in the early 1920s and was elected to the Madras Legislative Council in the 1926 elections. He served as the leader of the Swaraj Party in the house during the visit of the Simon Commission. In 1925–26, Chetty served as President of the Madras Corporation.

In 1934, Chetty defeated R. K. Shanmukham Chetty in the elections to the Imperial Legislative Council of India. He served as a member of the council before retiring from politics in the late 1930s.

== Condolence ==
Shri Venkatachalam Chetti was a member of the former Central Assembly from the year 1934 to 1938. He was, before that, the Leader of the Opposition on behalf of the Congress in the Madras Legislative Assembly.
