= Jejeebhoy baronets =

Baronetcy in the Baronetage of the United Kingdom

- Escutcheon of the Jejeebhoy baronets of Bombay
- Creation date: 1857
- Status: extant
- Motto: Industry and liberality
- Arms: Azure: a sun rising above a representation of the Ghautz, or mountains near Bombay, in base, and in chief two bees volant, all proper
- Crest: A mount, thereon amidst wheat, a peacock, in the beak an ear of wheat, all proper. Other: Behind the shield in saltire a key wards outwards Or and a rod Gules garnished Or.

The Jejeebhoy Baronetcy (sometimes spelled Jeejeebhoy), of Bombay, is a title in the Baronetage of the United Kingdom. It was created 6 August 1857 for Jamsetjee Jejeebhoy, a prominent Parsi merchant and philanthropist who was the first Parsi and first Indian to be knighted (1842) and the first to be made a baronet (1857). When Sir Jamsetjee Jejeebhoy was made a baronet, it was realised that the Parsee custom was for a change of names for each generation. This conflicted with the British tradition of using consistent surname for a particular baronetcy. In 1915, the Imperial Legislative Council passed the Sir Jamsetjee Jejeebhoy Baronetcy Act, providing that all the male heirs should take these names and no other. Similar provision was made for subsequent Parsee baronets. All holders of the title relinquish their own names and assume that of the first Baronet.

Following Sir Jamsetjee's death in 1859, he was succeeded by his eldest son Cursetji as the second baronet. The second baronet had three sons; his eldest son Manekji succeeded him as the third baronet in 1877. The third baronet was appointed a Companion of the Star of India (CSI) and as a justice of the peace, served on the council of the Governor of Bombay. He had one son, Cursetji (1878–1893), who predeceased him at a young age, and was succeeded by his younger brother Cowasji, the fourth baronet, who came to be known as the leader of the Parsi community in Bombay. His only son, Rustamji, succeeded him as the fifth baronet in 1908, and was knighted as a Knight Commander of the Order of the Star of India (KCSI) and later served as vice-president of the Indian Legislative Assembly. The fifth baronet was succeeded by his only son Cowasji in 1931 as the sixth baronet. The sixth baronet only had three daughters, and upon his death in 1968, the main line of male descent from the first baronet failed. His second cousin Manekji succeeded him as the seventh baronet; Manekji was a great-grandson of the second baronet through his youngest son Jamsetji Cursetji (1860–1916) and through his son Rustamji (1884–1947).

== Jejeebhoy baronets of Bombay, India (6 August 1857) ==
- Sir Jamsetjee Jejeebhoy, 1st Baronet (1783–1859)
- Sir Jamsetjee Jejeebhoy, 2nd Baronet, Cursetjee (1811–1877)
- Sir Jamsetjee Jejeebhoy, 3rd Baronet, Manockjee Cursetjee (1851–1898)
- Sir Jamsetjee Jejeebhoy, 4th Baronet, Cowasjee Cursetjee (1852–1908)
- Sir Jamsetjee Jejeebhoy, 5th Baronet, Rustomjee (1878–1931)
- Sir Jamsetjee Jejeebhoy, 6th Baronet, Cowasjee (1909–1968)
- Sir Jamsetjee Jejeebhoy, 7th Baronet, Maneckjee Rustomjee (1913–2006)
- Sir Jamsetjee Jejeebhoy, 8th Baronet, Rustomjee Maneckjee (born 1957) is a board member of Tata Group.

The heir apparent to the baronetcy is Jehangir Jejeebhoy (born 1986).
