= Jamsetjee Jejeebhoy =

Indian merchant (1783–1859)

Sir Jamsetjee Jejeebhoy BT, CMG, FRAS
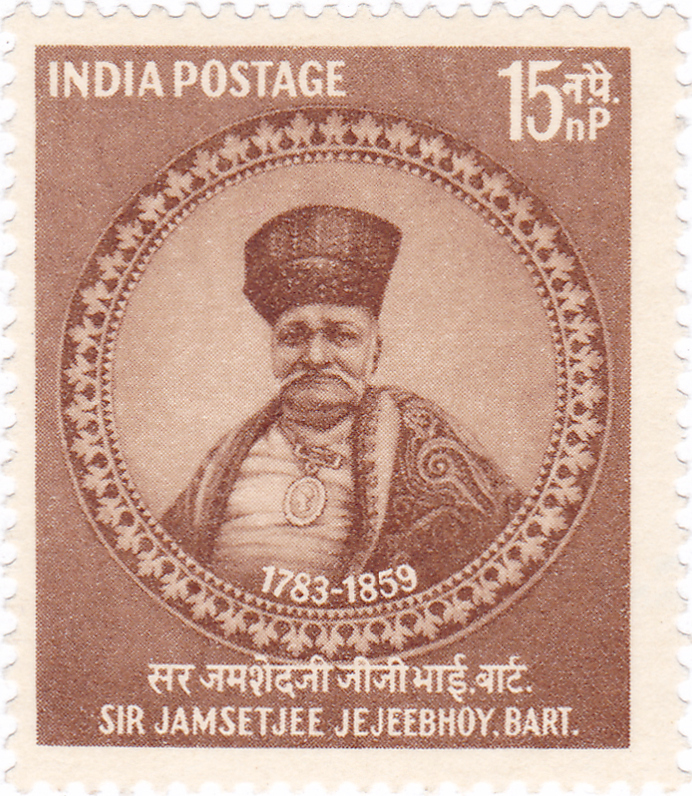
- Jejeebhoy on a 1959 stamp of India
- Born: 15 July 1783; Bombay, Maratha Confederacy
- Died: 14 April 1859 (aged 75); Bombay, Bombay Presidency, British India
- Occupations: Merchandiser, business magnate

Sir Jamsetjee Jejeebhoy, 1st Baronet, CMG, FRAS (15 July 1783 – 14 April 1859), also spelt Jeejeebhoy or Jeejebhoy, was an Indian merchant and philanthropist. He made a significant fortune in cotton and was also a participant in the opium trade.

== Early life and business career ==
Jejeebhoy was born in Bombay in 1783, the son of Merwanjee Mackjee Jejeebhoy and Jeevibai Cowasjee Jejeebhoy. His father was a Parsi textile merchant from Surat, Gujarat, who migrated to Bombay in the 1770s. Both of Jeejeebhoy's parents died in 1799, leaving the 16-year-old under the tutelage of his maternal uncle, Framjee Nasserwanjee Battliwala. At the age of 16, having had little formal education, he made his first visit to Calcutta and then began his first voyage to China to trade in cotton and opium under the mentorship of Sir Roger Faria, whose offices he trained at, initially as a clerk, before he rose in the ranks.

Jejeebhoy's second voyage to China was made in a ship of the East India Company's fleet. Under the command of Sir Nathaniel Dance, this ship drove off a French squadron under Rear-Admiral Charles-Alexandre Léon Durand Linois in the Battle of Pulo Aura.

On Jejeebhoy's fourth voyage in 1805 to China, the Indiaman in which he sailed was forced to surrender to the French, by whom he was carried as a prisoner to the Cape of Good Hope, then a neutral Dutch possession. He met William Jardine on this ship where the latter was a surgeon and who would go on to become his partner in opium trade. After much delay and great difficulty, Jejeebhoy made his way to Calcutta in a Danish ship. Undaunted, Jejeebhoy undertook another voyage to China which was more successful than any of his previous journeys.

By this time Jejeebhoy had established his reputation as an enterprising merchant possessed of considerable wealth. In 1803, he married his maternal uncle's daughter Avabai (d. 1870) and settled in Bombay, where he directed his commercial operations on an extended scale. Around this time, he changed his name from "Jamshed" to "Jamsetjee" to sound similar to names of the Gujarati community. By the age of 40, he had made over two crore rupees, a staggering sum in those days. Further riches came to him from the cotton trade during the Napoleonic Wars. He bought his own fleet of ships. Lord Elphinstone, then Governor of Bombay, said of him, "By strict integrity, by industry and punctuality in all his commercial transactions, he contributed to raise the character of the Bombay merchant in the most distant markets."

In 1814, his co-operation with the British East India company had yielded him sufficient profits to purchase his first ship, the Good Success, and he gradually added another six ships to this, usually carrying primarily opium and a little cotton to China. By 1836, Jejeebhoy's firm was large enough to employ his three sons and other relatives, and he had amassed what at that period of Indian mercantile history was regarded as fabulous wealth.

Jejeebhoy was known by the nickname "Mr. Bottlewalla". "Walla" meant "vendor", and Jejeebhoy's business interests included the manufacture and sale of bottles on the basis of his uncle's business. Jejeebhoy and his family would often sign letters and checks using the name "Battliwala", and were known by that name in business and society, but he did not choose this assumed surname when it came to the baronetcy.

In 1818, he formed the business, trading and shipping firm "Jamsetjee Jejeebhoy & Co." with two other associates Motichund Amichund and Mahomed Ali Rogay as Jejeebhoy's business associates. He was later joined by his mentor in his early years, a notable opium merchant of Goan extraction, Sir Rogério de Faria. His voyages to China resulted in a long trading partnership with the Canton based company Jardine Matheson & Co. The connection with Jeejeebhoy was instrumental as Jardine and Matheson built up their great firm, continuing the profitable and amiable association with the Parsi entrepreneur. Jeejeebhoy long continued as one of the close associates who served as underwriters to Jardine, Matheson and Company. A tribute to their connection exists even today in a portrait of Jeejeebhoy which hangs in Jardine's Hong Kong office. He was seen as the chief representative of the Indian community in Bombay by the British Imperial authorities.

He was one of two Indian members on the first board of management the Great Indian Peninsula Railway along with Jagannath Shankarseth.

== Philanthropy ==
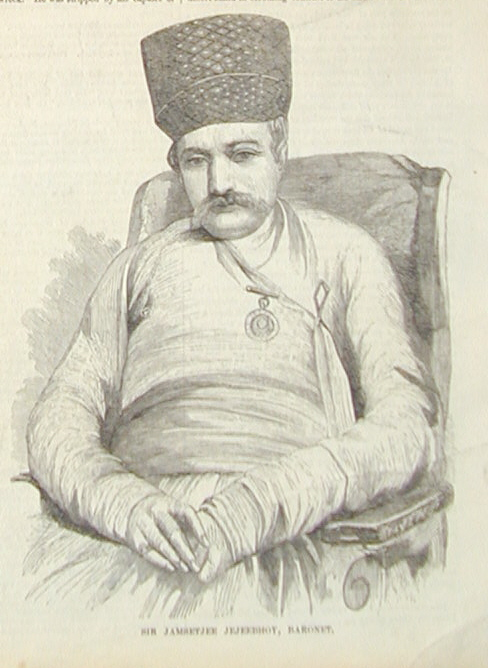
Sketch of Jejeebhoy, 1857

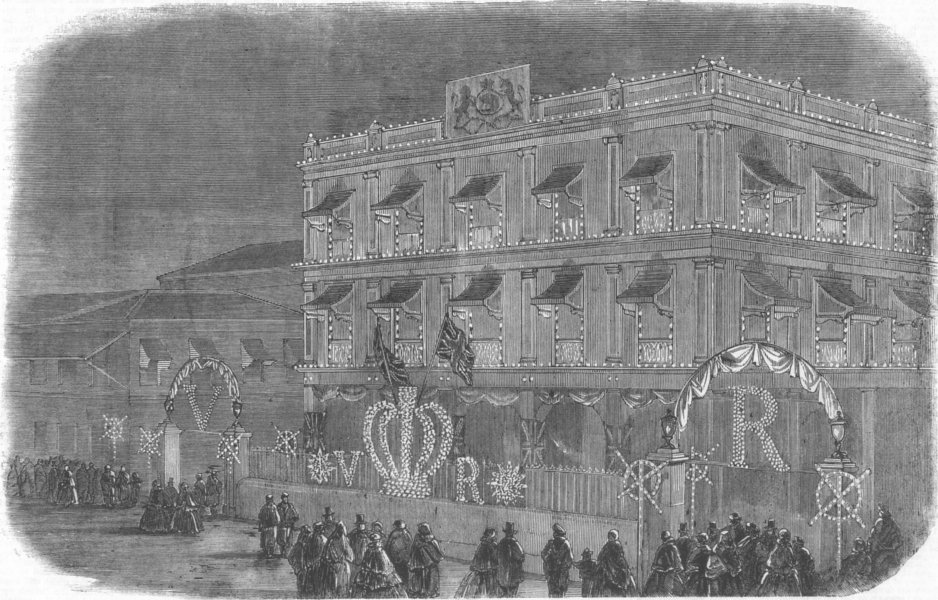
The Illustrated London News print of Jejeebhoy's residence, 1858

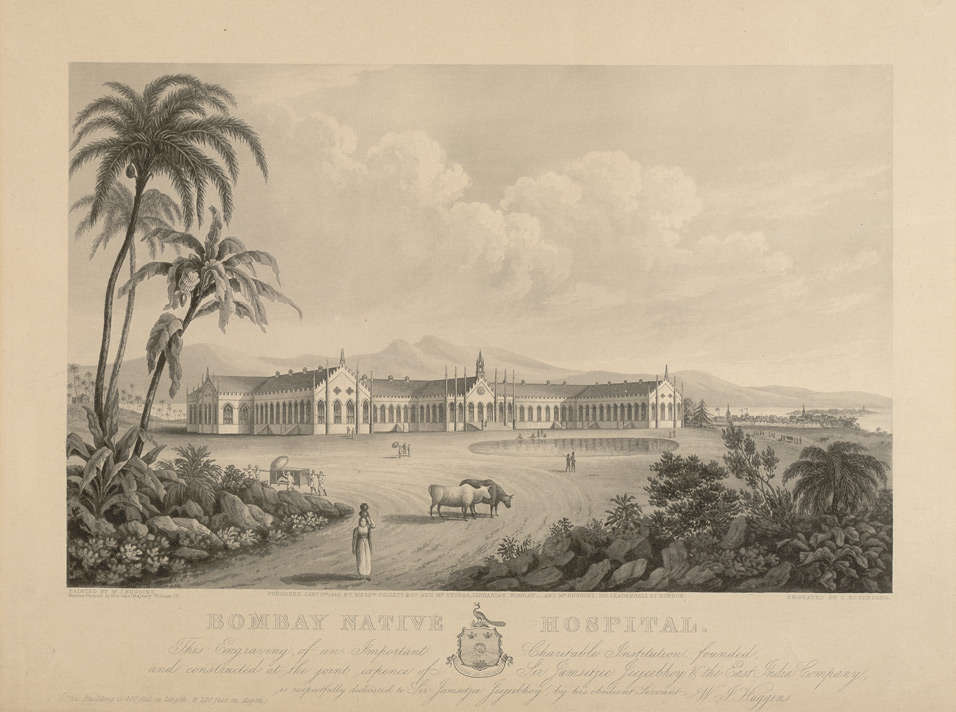
Engraving of the Bombay Native Hospital, constructed at the joint expense of Jejeebhoy and the East India Company; it was later renamed "Sir J. J. Hospital".

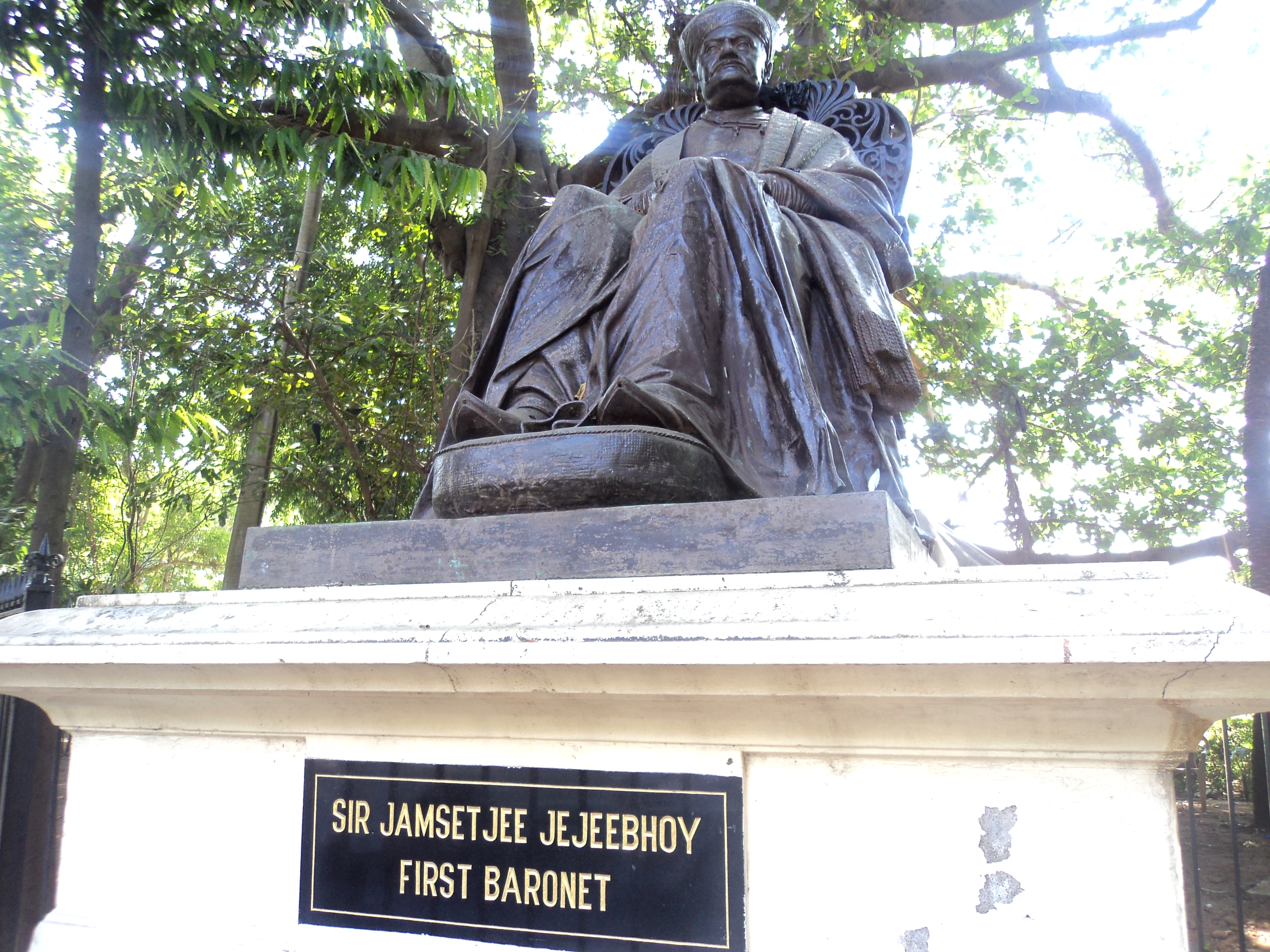
Sir Jamsetjee Jejeebhoy statue, Mumbai

An essentially self-made man, having experienced the miseries of poverty in early life, Jejeebhoy developed great sympathy for his poorer countrymen. In his later life he was occupied with alleviating human distress in all its forms. Parsi and Christian, Hindu and Muslim, were alike the objects of his beneficence. Hospitals, schools, homes of charity and pension funds throughout India (particularly in Bombay, Navsari, Surat, and Poona) were created or endowed by Jejeebhoy, and he financed the construction of many public works such as wells, reservoirs, bridges, and causeways. By the time of his death in 1859, he was estimated to have donated over £230,000 to charity. His philanthropic endeavours began in earnest in 1822, when he personally remitted the debts of all the poor in Bombay's civil jail. Some of Jejeebhoy's notable charitable works include:

- Mahim Causeway: The British Government had refused to build a causeway to connect the island of Mahim to Bandra. Jejeebhoy's wife, Avabai Jamsetjee Jeejeebhoy, spent Rs. 1,55,800 to finance its construction, after whom it was named. The work began in 1841 and is believed to have been completed four years later.
- He donated Rs. 1,00,000 to build Grant Medical College and Sir JJ Group of Hospitals
- Jejeebhoy donated to at least 126 notable public charities, including the Sir J. J. School of Art, the Sir J. J. College of Architecture, the Sir J. J. Institute of Applied Art and the Seth R.J.J. High School. He also endowed charities dedicated to helping his fellow Parsis and created the "Sir Jamsetjee Jeejebhoy Parsi Benevolent Fund" in 1849.
- He paid two-thirds of the entire cost of the Poona waterworks, with the remainder coming from the government.
- He gave a substantial donation to Bombay Samachar founded by Fardunjee Marzban in July 1822. The Bombay Times was launched in 1838 by a syndicate of persons, which included Sir Jamsetjee. In 1861, it was renamed The Times of India. Jamsetjee also donated handsomely to the Jam-e-Jamshed Press when it was founded in 1859.
- The Dr. Bhau Daji Lad Museum, formerly The Victoria and Albert Museum, which was designed by a London architect was built with the patronage of many wealthy Indian businessmen and philanthropists like Jejeebhoy, David Sassoon and Jagannath Shankarseth.
- Construction of Charni Road and relief to cattle. Between 1822 and 1838, cattle from the congested fort area used to graze freely at the Esplanade Maidan (now called Azad Maidan), an open ground opposite the Chhatrapati Shivaji Terminus. In 1838, the British rulers introduced a 'grazing fee' which several cattle-owners could not afford. Therefore, Sir Jamshedji Jeejeebhoy spent Rs. 20,000 from his own purse for purchasing some grasslands near the seafront at Thakurdwar and saw that the starving cattle grazed without a fee in that area. In time the area became known as "Charni" meaning grazing. When a railway station on the BB&CI railway was constructed there it was called Charni Road.
- He spent Rs. 1,45,403 to set up the Sir J. J. Dharamshala at Bellasis Road, and until today, innumerable old and destitute people receive free food, clothing, shelter and medicines. All their needs for the past 150 years, irrespective of caste, creed or religion, have been looked after by the Dharamshala, the first free home for the elderly in Asia.
- Whether it was the famine of Ireland (1822), the floods in France (1856) or the fire, which ravaged both Bombay (1803) and Surat (1837), this beacon of altruism gave graciously to one and all without discriminating on the basis of caste or creed.

== Baronetcy ==
Jejeebhoy's services were first recognised by the British Empire in 1842 by the bestowal of a knighthood and in 1857, by the award of a baronetcy. These were the very first distinctions of their kind conferred by Queen Victoria upon a British subject in India.

On Jejeebhoy's death in 1859, his Baronetcy was inherited by his eldest son, Cursetjee Jejeebhoy, who, by a special Act of the Viceroy's Council in pursuance of a provision in the letters-patent, took the name of Sir Jamsetjee Jejeebhoy as second baronet.

When he died in 1859, Jeejeebhoy was remembered in an obituary by a Bombay-based newspaper as, "Simple in his tastes and manners, and dignified in his address, the personal appearance of Sir Jamsetjee, in later years, was a picture of greatness in repose. He had done his work, and entered upon the sabbath of his life.…"

== Advocate of non-violence ==
In 1855, under royal patronage, the Patriotic Fund was launched to aid the wounded soldiers and widows of those who had died in the Crimean War. Jamsetjee donated Rs. 5,000/- for this cause. But some remarks from his speech on this occasion are most significant:

Of none of the great evils which afflict our race do we form such inadequate conceptions as of the evils of war. War is exhibited to us in the dazzling dress of poetry, fiction, and history, where its horrors are carefully concealed beneath its gaudy trappings; or we see, perhaps, its plumes and epaulettes, and harlequin finery, we hear of the magnificence of the apparatus, the bravery of the troops, the glory of the victors, but the story of the wholesale miseries and wretchedness and wrongs which follow in its train is untold … What nation is not groaning under war-debts, the greatest of national burdens! Had the inconceivable sum wasted in the work of human butchery been applied to promote individual comfort and national prosperity, the world would not now be so far behind as it is in its career of progress … Our duty to relieve the sufferers in this great war would have remained the same whether the war had been a just one or not; but, considering the nature and objects of this war, we extend this relief now more as a privilege than as a duty … To the call of our gracious Sovereign, and to the call of humanity, the Parsis, my lord, will cordially respond.

His non-violent attitude extended also to the animal kingdom. He would not allow any form of cruelty towards animals. The East India Company introduced a rule "for the annual destruction of dogs in Bombay island, and a considerable number were from time to time destroyed, in spite of frequent petitions from the public". This mass dog killing led to a serious riot. To alleviate this suffering, Jamsetjee Jeejeebhoy and Amichand Shah founded Bombay Panjrapole on 18 October 1834.

== Arms ==
Coat of arms of Jamsetjee Jejeebhoy
Crest A mount, thereon amidst wheat, a peacock, in the beak an ear of wheat, all proper. Escutcheon Azure: a sun rising above a representation of the Ghautz, or mountains near Bombay, in base, and in chief two bees volant, all proper. Motto Industry and liberality..

== General and cited references ==
- B. K. Karanjia (1998). Give Me a Bombay Merchant Anytime!: The Life of Sir Jamsetjee Jejeebhoy, Bt., 1783–1859. University of Mumbai.

Baronetage of the United Kingdom
New creation	Baronet (of Bombay); 1857–1859	Succeeded by Cursetjee Jejeebhoy
