= Sir Jamsetjee Jejeebhoy, 5th Baronet =

Sir Jamsetjee Jejeebhoy, 5th Baronet, KCSI, (6 March 1878 – 6 February 1931) was an Indian businessman.

Born Rustomjee Jejeebhoy, he was the son of Sir Jamsetjee Jejeebhoy, the fourth baronet.

Baronetage of the United Kingdom
Preceded by Cowsajee Cursetjee Jejeebhoy	Baronet (of Bombay); 1908–1931	Succeeded by Cowsajee Jejeebhoy
