= S. Sadanand =

Indian journalist

- Born: 1900
- Died: 1953 (aged 52–53)
- Occupation: Journalist
- Known for: Started the Free Press of India Agency

Swaminathan Sadanand (1900–1953) was an Indian journalist.

In 1927 Sadanand started the Free Press of India Agency, which was the first news agency owned and managed by Indians.

In 1930 Sadanand became founder editor of the English-language The Free Press Journal which, according to A. R. Desai, was a strong supporter of the Indian National Congress's (INC) "demand and struggle for independence" from Great Britain. In 1933, he bought The Indian Express, (Madras), from Varadarajulu Naidu, an INC supporter who had founded it in 1932. The closure of The Free Press Journal caused The Indian Express to pass into the control of Ramnath Goenka. He was one of the seven initial shareholders of the Press Trust of India when it was founded in 1947.

Sadanand never went to college and was a self-taught journalist. J. K. Singh calls him a great journalist but a poor business manager and a "sad failure". Rangaswami Parthasarathy calls him an able editor, an innovator and a fearless patriot.
