= Avabai Jamsetjee Jeejeebhoy =

Avabai, Lady Jeejeebhoy (1793–24 February 1870) was the wife of Sir Jamsetjee Jeejeebhoy, 1st baronet. She is best known for having funded the construction of the Mahim causeway in Mumbai (Bombay), which serves today as an important link between the island city of Mumbai with its north-western suburbs.

== Personal life ==
Avabai was born the daughter of Framji Batlivala, a Parsi merchant from Daman who carried out a trade in bottles in the Fort area of downtown Mumbai (Bombay). The family belonged to the Parsi community. As per Indian custom of that era, Avabai was wed at age 10 to the 20-year-old Jamshetjee, who had lost both his parents at a young age and was then venturing his first foray into commerce under the tutelage of Avabai's father. Jamshetjee was Avabai's first cousin, being the son of Framji's sister Jeevibai. The couple enjoyed a marriage of great felicity and were the parents of seven sons and three daughters; however, four sons and two daughters succumbed to the dangers that plagued infancy in the 19th century.

As a merchant, Jamshetjee enjoyed success far beyond his expectations and accumulated a vast fortune; by some estimates, he was worth a stupendous two crore (twenty million) rupees by age 40. Both he and Avabai were unstinting in their philanthropic efforts and are credited with funding as many as 126 different public charities. In recognition of these services to the public good, Jamshetjee was conferred a knighthood in 1842 and Avabai become Lady Jeejeebhoy. Subsequently, in 1857, a baronetcy was conferred upon Jamshetjee.

== Mahim causeway ==
Before 1845, there was no connection by land between the present-day Mumbai neighbourhoods of Mahim and Bandra; people had to be ferried across the Mahim Creek. This was dangerous during the monsoons, when the seas around Mumbai are extremely rough; people sometimes lost their lives merely in crossing between Mahim and Bandra on the ferries. The passage of carriages and other vehicles was impossible and separate arrangements for conveyance had to be made on either side.

The government deliberated upon the matter, estimated the required expense as being one lakh rupees, and made it known that paucity of funds precluded the expenditure of what was then a vast sum of money. Avabai, perhaps by personal experience, well knew the importance to local residents of building the causeway, and resolved upon seeing the needful done. She arranged with the government to have the causeway constructed by them at her expense. As the daughter of Framji, who had funded Jamshetjee's early mercantile ventures and received a share of the proceeds, Avabai was a lady of independent means. She stipulated that given the circumstances of the causeway's construction, no toll should ever be charged by the government for its use.

Construction of the Mahim causeway began in 1841 and was completed in 1845. The estimated cost of construction was far exceeded, and finally amounted to Rs. 1,57,000/-, all of which was paid out of money donated to the treasury by Avabai from her personal funds. The causeway bears a dedication to Lady Avabai Jeejeebhoy in four languages.

== See also ==
- Mahim Causeway
- Jamsetjee Jeejeebhoy
