= Narasimha Chintaman Kelkar =

Indian lawyer and writer

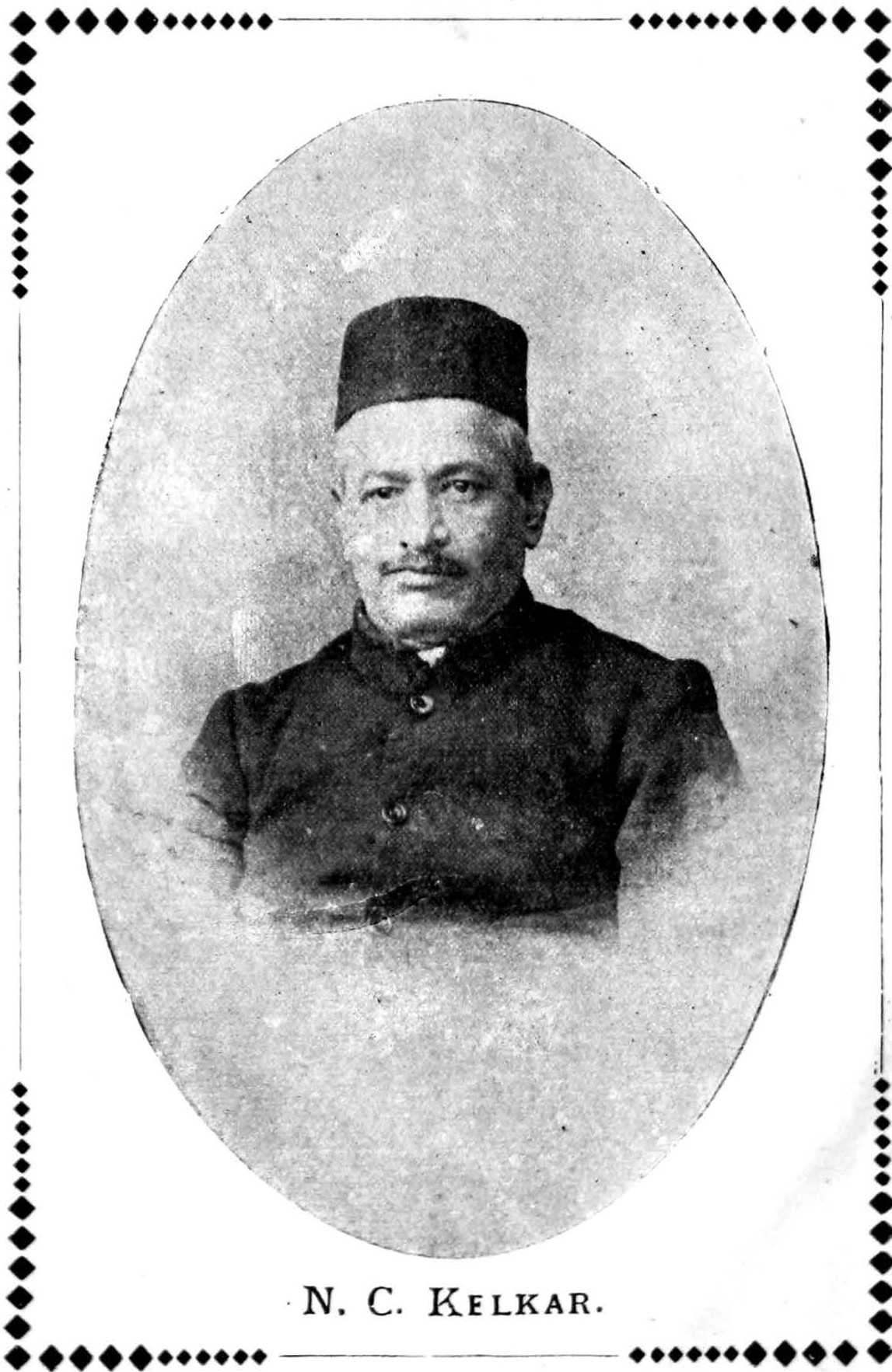
- Born: 24 August 1872; Miraj, Maharashtra, India
- Died: 14 October 1947 (aged 75); Pune, India
- Other name: Sahityasamrat Tatyasaheb Kelkar
- Occupations: Politician, lawyer, editor, novelist, historian
- Political party: Hindu Mahasabha
- Other political affiliations: Indian National Congress
- Movement: Indian Independence Movement

Narasimha Chintaman Kelkar (N. C. Kelkar), popularly known as Sahityasamrat Tatyasaheb Kelkar (24 August 1872 – 14 October 1947), was a lawyer from Miraj as well as a dramatist, novelist, short story writer, poet, biographer, critic, historian, writer on philosophical and political themes. He was born in Chitpavan Brahmin family. He was a literary and political figure in Maharashtra, India, and also both editor and trustee of the newspaper Kesari. He served as editor twice when Tilak was imprisoned in 1897 and 1908.

He was associated with Shikshana Prasarak Mandali Pune, an education society in Pune established in 1904. He was also closely associated with Bal Gangadhar Tilak in the Indian independence movement. He had also served as the president of Marathi Granth Sangrahalaya, Thane.

After the death of Tilak in 1920, he became one of the foremost leaders of the Tilak faction in the Congress party. He was elected to the Central Legislative Assembly, the lower house of the Imperial Legislative Council in 1923 and served until 1929. He was president of Akhil Bharatiya Hindu Mahasabha twice at Jabalpur in 1928 and Delhi at 1932.

== Literary accomplishments ==
=== Play ===
- Sarojini (1901)
- Tohi mich ani hahi mich alias Mavardevachi jidgoli (1898)
- Chandragupta (1913)
- Totayache band (1913)
- Krishnarjuna yaddha (1915)
- Sant Bhanudas (1919)
- Pattichi nivad, Jangal main mangal (incomplete)

=== Novels ===
- Andharved (1928)
- Navalpurcha santhanik (1934),
- Balidan (1937)
- Kokancha por (1942)
- Kavala ani Dhapi, Jagachi rit (1943)

=== Short stories ===
- Moujeche char prahar (1931)
- Kusha vishi ani itar goshti (1950)

=== Poetry ===
- Kavyopahar (1927)
- Padyaguchha (1936)
- Gatagoshti : Autobiographical writing (1939)
- Patravyvahar : supplementary to Gatagoshti (1941)

=== Biographies ===
- Garibaldi : in Marathi (1902), this book ran for five editions, and the last edition was published in 1944.
- Life and times of Lokamanya Tilak (in English)
- Maza janmabharcha ek udyag, Lokamanya Tilak yanche charitra Purvardha (1923)
- Landmarks of Lokmanya's life (in English) (1924)
- Lokamanya Tilakanche punyasmaran (1927)
- Lokamanya Tilak yanche charitra Uttarardha Vol. II (1928)
- Lokamanya Tilak yanche charitra Uttarardha Vol. III (1928)
- Ayarlandche rastravir Vol I and II with P V Gadgil (1930)

=== History ===
- Irelandcha itihas (1909)
- Marathe va Ingraj (1918)
- Itihas vihar (1926)
- French rajyakranti (1937)

=== Court cases ===
- Tilak trial (in English, 1908)
- Contempt of court Case (3rd edition 1924)
- Kesarivaril Khatla (1924)

=== Philosophy ===
- Bharatiya tatvajnan : Keshavsut (1934)
- Gavaran Gita (1944)
- Sudharana, sukha va sadachar (1945)
- Jnaneshvari Sarvasva (1946)

=== Political writing ===
- Case of Indian Home Rule (1917)
- Tirangi Navamatwad (a book on Marxism/communism)

== See also ==
- Responsive Cooperation Party
