= R. K. Shanmukham Chetty =

Indian lawyer, economist and politician

Sir Ramasamy Chettiar Kandasamy Shanmukham Chettiar KCIE
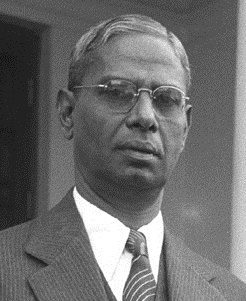
- Shanmukham Chettiar in 1947

Minister of Finance
- In office 15 August 1947 – 17 August 1948
- Prime Minister: Jawaharlal Nehru
- Preceded by: Office Established
- Succeeded by: John Matthai

Diwan of Cochin kingdom
- In office 1935–1941
- Monarch: Rama Varma XVII
- Preceded by: C. G. Herbert
- Succeeded by: A. F. W. Dickinson

President of the Central Legislative Assembly
- In office September 1933 – 1935
- Governor-General: Freeman Freeman-Thomas, 1st Marquess of Willingdon
- Preceded by: Sir Muhammad Yakub
- Succeeded by: Sir Abdur Rahim

Member of the Imperial Legislative Council of India (Central Legislative Assembly)
- In office 1924–1935
- Governors-General: Rufus Isaacs, 1st Marquess of Reading, E. F. L. Wood, 1st Earl of Halifax, Freeman Freeman-Thomas, 1st Marquess of Willingdon

Personal details
- Born: 17 October 1892 Coimbatore, Madras Presidency, British India
- Died: 5 May 1953 (aged 60) Coimbatore, Madras State, India
- Party: Swaraj Party, Justice Party
- Education: University of Madras; Madras Christian College, Madras Law College
- Occupation: Legislator
- Profession: Lawyer, politician

Sir Ramasamy Chettiar Kandasamy Shanmukham Chettiar KCIE (17 October 1892 – 5 May 1953) was an Indian lawyer, economist and statesman who served as first Finance Minister of India from 1947 to 1948. He also served as President of India's Central Legislative Assembly from 1933 to 1935 and Diwan of Cochin kingdom from 1935 to 1941.

Shanmukham Chettiar was born in Coimbatore in 1892 and studied at Madras Christian College and Madras Law College. On completion of his education, Shanmukham Chettiar joined politics and served both in the Indian nationalist Swaraj Party as well as the Justice Party. Shanmukham Chettiar was elected to the Central Legislative Assembly of India and served as its Deputy President from 1931 to 1935. After losing the 1935 elections, Chettiar returned to South India where he served as Diwan of Cochin kingdom from 1935 to 1941. On India's independence in 1947, Jawaharlal Nehru, the first Prime Minister of India controversially chose Chettiar as his Finance Minister despite the latter's well known pro-British leanings. Shanmukham Chettiar died on 5 May 1953.

During his public life, Chettiar also identified with a number of social causes. He was a strong supporter of the Tamil Isai Movement. Shanmukham Chettiar was the Finance Minister of India when the country's first budget was tabled in Parliament on 26 November 1947.

== Early life ==
Shanmukham Chettiar was born to Kandasamy Chettiar in Vaaniar Street, Coimbatore on 17 October 1892. Shanmukham Chettiar's grandfather Ramasami Chettiar had migrated to Coimbatore in the middle of the 19th century. The family was involved in business and owned a number of mills in Coimbatore city.

Shanmukham Chettiar had his schooling at Coimbatore. He studied economics at Madras Christian College and graduated in law from Madras Law College. On completion of his graduation, Shanmukham Chettiar did not join the bar. Instead, he took care of the family business and after some time, entered politics.

== Early political career ==
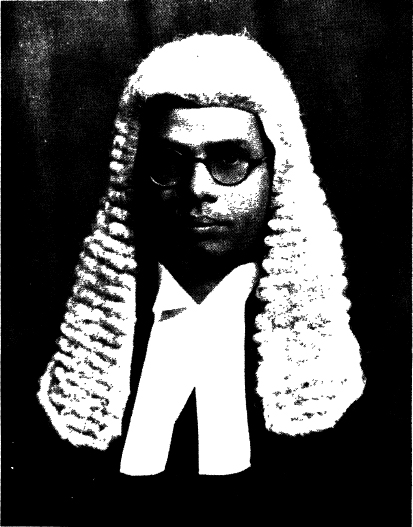
R. K. Shanmukham Chettiar in 1924

Shanmukham Chettiar joined the Justice Party and became a Councillor in the Coimbatore municipality in 1917. Soon afterwards, he was elected Vice-Chairman of the Coimbatore Municipality. Chettiar is credited with having brought about some reforms in the municipal administration.

In 1920, Shanmukham Chettiar participated in the Madras Presidency legislative council elections and was elected to the Madras Legislative Council. He served as a member of the Madras Legislative Council from 1920 to 1922, when he resigned. He joined the Swaraj Party and was, in 1924, elected to the Central Legislative Assembly, the newly inaugurated lower house of the Imperial Legislative Council of India. Chettiar represented Indian employers at the International Labour Conference in Geneva in 1928, 1929 and 1932. He was the Indian delegate at the Imperial Economic Conference held at Ottawa in 1932.

In 1932, Shanmukhan Chettiar was made Deputy-President of the Central Legislative Assembly and in 1934, made President, in succession to Sir Ibrahim Rahimtoola. Shanmukham Chettiar served as President till 1935, when he had to quit his membership of the Central legislative Assembly after losing the 1935 elections.

During his tenure as member of the Central Legislative Assembly, Chettiar is believed to have enjoyed the support of Lord Willingdom, who once even referred to Shanmugham Chettiar as his "god-son".

== Later political career ==
- Chettiyar served as Diwan of Cochin from 1935 to 1941. During his tenure, new reforms were brought in the administration of the princely state. Chettiar introduced schemes for the improvement of Cochin port. He also tried to do away with Hindu religious superstitions and introduce Periyar E. V. Ramasamy's schemes. Chettiyar returned to Madras in 1941 and was succeeded by E. F. W. Dickinson.
- In 1938, Chettiyar visited Geneva as the Indian delegate to the League of Nations. He was also India's delegate to the World Monetary Conference at Bretton Woods in 1944. During this period, Shanmukham Chettiar tried to revive the staggering Justice Party but failed. For a short period, he served as constitutional advisor to the Nawab of Bhopal. He also served as President of the Indian Tariff Board. Due to his pro-British views, Shanmugam Chettiyar was not included in the Constituent Assembly.
- When India got independence on 15 August 1947, he is reported to have said

... we have secured freedom from foreign yoke, mainly through the operation of world events, and partly through a unique act of enlightened self-abnegation on behalf of the erstwhile rulers of the country....

- Due to his expertise in economics, Shanmugam Chettiyar was chosen by the Father of the Nation, Mahathma Gandhi Same religion ship Chettiyar against the wishes of Jawaharlal Nehru, to be the Finance Minister in independent India's first cabinet. However, due to conflict of views with Nehru, Chettiyar quit after a short time. Shanmugam Chettiyar is, today, remembered for presenting the first budget of independent India on 26 November 1947.
- Chettiyar returned to state politics and was re-elected to the Madras State Legislative Assembly in the 1952 elections as an independent candidate.

== Constituent Assembly Debates ==
In the Constituent Assembly, Chettiyar he intervened on the issues of fiscal federalism.

The Parliament House will join with me in conveying our condolence to his family. The House may stand in silence for a minute and express its sorrow.

== Death ==
- Shanmugam Chettiyar suffered a severe heart attack on 3 May 1953. He succumbed to a second attack on the evening of 5 May 1953.

== Honours ==
- Chettiyar was made a Knight Commander of the Order of the Indian Empire on 3 June 1933. He was conferred with the degree of Doctor of Philosophy by the Annamalai University. A life-size bronze statue of Dr. Chettiyar was unveiled on the campus of R. K. Srirangammal Kalvi Nilayam Higher Secondary School, Coimbatore on 6 July 2014. Kochi's Shanmugham road is named after him.

== Notes ==
| Preceded by Liaquat Ali Khan | Finance Minister of India; 1947–1949 | Succeeded by John Mathai |
