= Central Legislative Assembly =

Lower house of the British Indian Imperial Legislative Council (1919–1947)

- Imperial Legislative Council
- Star of India

Type
- Type: Lower house of the Imperial Legislative Council

History
- Founded: 23 December 1919
- Disbanded: 14 August 1947
- Succeeded by: Constituent Assembly of India

Leadership
- President: Sir Frederick Whyte (first); Ganesh Vasudev Mavalankar (last)
- Seats: 145

Elections
- Voting system: First past the post
- First election: 1920 Indian general election
- Last election: 1945 Indian general election

Motto
- Heaven's Light Our Guide

Meeting place
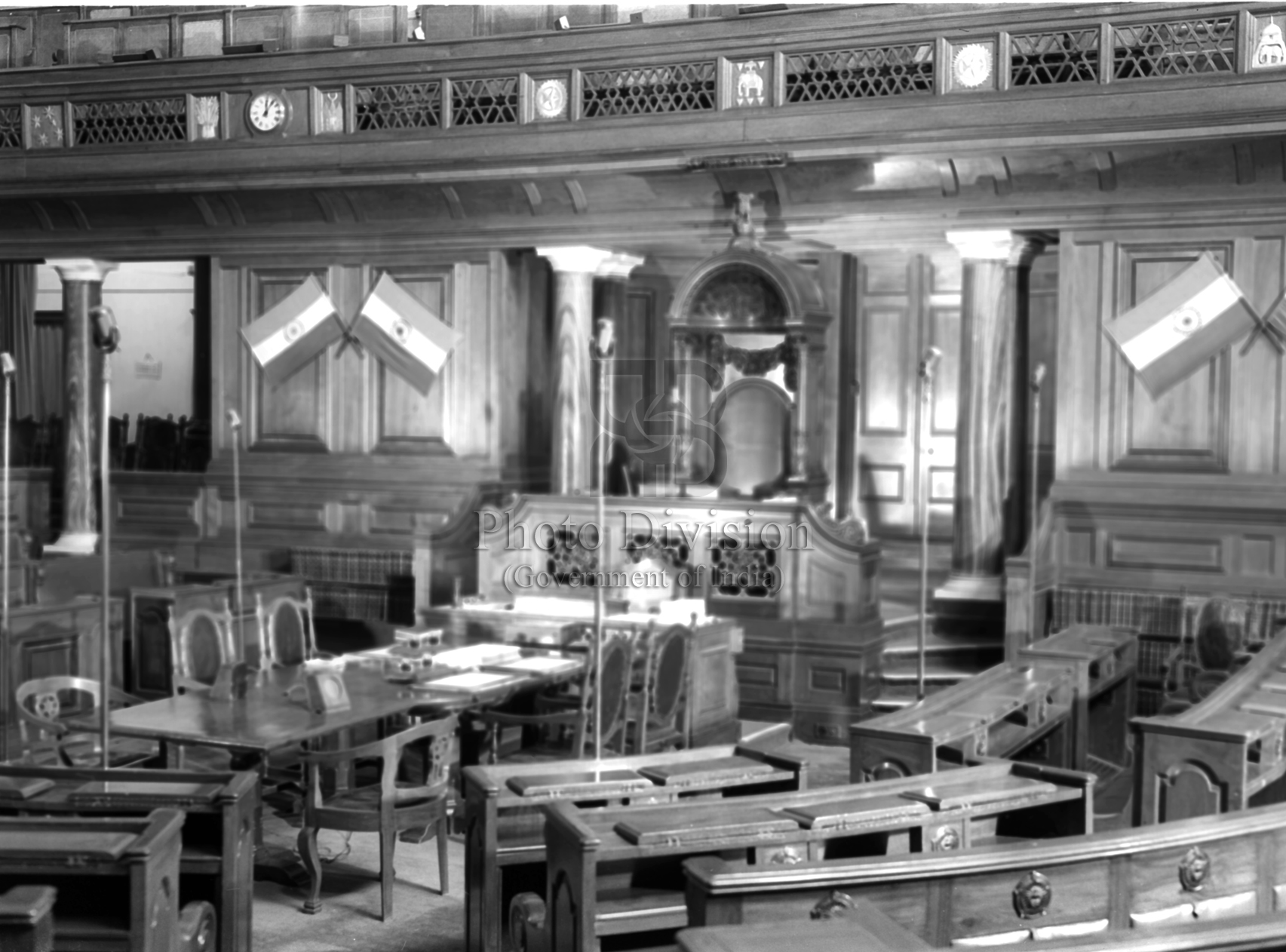
- Assembly chamber, Council House, Raisina Hill, New Delhi

The Central Legislative Assembly was the lower house of the Indian Legislature, the legislature of British India. It was created by the Government of India Act 1919, implementing the Montagu–Chelmsford Reforms. It was also sometimes called the Indian Legislative Assembly and the Imperial Legislative Assembly. The Council of State was the upper house of the legislature for India.

As a result of Indian independence, the Legislative Assembly was dissolved on 14 August 1947 and its place taken by the Constituent Assembly of India and the Constituent Assembly of Pakistan including East Bengal (modern-day Bangladesh).

== Composition ==
The new Assembly was the lower house of a bicameral parliament, with a new Council of State as the upper house, reviewing legislation passed by the Assembly. However, both its powers and its electorate were limited.

The Assembly had 145 members who were either nominated or indirectly elected from the provinces.

The Legislative Assembly had no members from the princely states, as they were not part of British India. On 23 December 1919, when King-Emperor George V gave royal assent to the Government of India Act 1919, he also made a proclamation which created the Chamber of Princes, to provide a forum for the states to use to debate national questions and make their collective views known to the Government of India.

=== Nominated members ===
The nominated members were officials or non-officials and nominated by the Government of India and the provinces.

==== Officials ====
There were a total of 26 nominated officials out of which 14 were nominated by the Government of India from the Viceroy's Executive Council, Council of State and from the Secretariat. The other 12 came from the provinces. Madras, Bombay and Bengal nominated two officials while United Provinces, Punjab, Bihar & Orissa, Central Provinces, Assam and Burma nominated one each.

==== Non-officials ====
There were a total of 15 nominated non-officials out of which 5 were nominated by the Government of India representing five special interests namely Associated Chambers of Commerce, Indian Christians, Labour interests, Anglo-Indians and the Depressed Classes. The other 10 non-officials were nominated from the provinces namely two from Bengal, United Provinces and Punjab and one each from Bombay, Bihar & Orissa, Berar and the North West Frontier Province.

=== Elected members ===
Initially, of its 142 members, 101 were elected and 41 were nominated. Of the 101 elected members, 52 came from general constituencies, 29 were elected by Muslims, 2 by Sikhs, 7 by Europeans, 7 by landlords, and 4 by business men. Later, one seat each was added for Delhi, Ajmer-Merwara and the North West Frontier Province.

The constituencies were divided as follows:

Province	Seats	Names of Constituencies
Assam	4	General (2): Assam Valley, Surma Valley with Shillong; Muslim: Assam Muhammadan; Assam European
Bengal	16	General (6): Calcutta Urban (1), Calcutta suburbs (Hoogly, Haorah, 24 Pargana Dist Municipal) (1), Calcutta Rural, Presidency Division (1), Burdwan Division (excluding Hoogly and Howrah Dist) (1), Dacca Division (1), Chittagong Rajshahi Division (1); Muslim (5): Calcutta and suburbs (Hoogly, Haorah, 24 Pargana Dist) (1), Burdwan and Calcutta Presidency Division (1), Dacca Division (1), Chittagong Division (1), Rajshahi Division (1); Europeans in Bengal Presidency (2); Landholders Bengal (1); Commerce (2): Indian Chambers of Commerce (1), Rotation: Bengal Chambers of Commerce or Marwari Association or Bengal Mahajan Sabha (1)
Bihar and Orissa	12	General (8): Tirhut Division (2), Orissa (2), Patna with Shahabad (1), Gaya with Monghyr (1), Bhagalpur Purnea and the Santhal Parganas (1), Chota Nagpur Division (1); Muslim (3): Patna and Chota Nagpur cum Orissa (1), Bhagalpur Division (1), Tirhut Division (1); Bihar and Orissa Landholders (1)
Bombay	16	General (8): Bombay City Urban (2), Sind (1), Northern Division (2), Southern Division (1), Central (2); Muslim (4): Bombay City Urban (1), Sind Urban (1), Sind Rural in rotation with Northern Division (1), Central Division in rotation with Southern Division (1); Europeans in Presidency (1); Commerce (2) Indian Merchants Chamber (1), The Bombay Millowners' Association or The Ahmedabad Millowners' Association (1); Landholders Rotation (1): Sind Jagirdars & Zamindars or Gujarat & Deccan Sardars & Inamdars
Burma	4	General (3); European (1)
Central Provinces	5	General (3): Nagpur Division (1), Central Provinces Hindi Division (The Narmada, Jabalpur and Chhattisgarh Divisions) (2); Muslim (1); Landholders (1)
Madras	16	General (11): Madras City Urban (1), Madras Districts Rural (1), Ganjam cum Vizagapatnam (1), Godavari cum Krishna (1), Guntur cum Nellore (1), Chittoor cum Ceded Dists (Anantpur, Bellary, Cuddapah, Kurnool) (1), Salem, Coimbatore cum North Arcot (1), Chingleput cum South Arcot (1), Tanjore cum Trichinopoly (1), Madurai, Ramnad cum Tinnevelly (1), Nilgiris and West Coast (Malabar, Anjengo, S. Canara) (1); Muslim (3): North Madras (Ganjam, Vizgapatam, Godavari, Krishna, Guntur, Nellore, Anantapur, Bellary, Cuddapah, Kurnool and Chittoor) (1), South Madras (Chingleput, Madras, Arcot, North & South Coimbatore, Tanjore, Trichinopoly, Madurai) (1), Nilgiris and W. Coast (Malabar, S. Canara) (1); Europeans in Presidency (1); Landholders in Presidency (1)
Punjab	12	General (3): Ambala Division (1), Jullundur Division (1), West Punjab (Lahore, Rawalpindi, Multan) Division (1); Muslim (6): East Punjab (Ambala, Kangra, Hoshiarpur, Jullunder, Ludhiana) (1), East Central Punjab (Ferozepur, Lahore, Amritsar and Gurdaspur) (1), West Central Punjab (Sialkot, Gujranwala, Sheikhupura and Lyallpur) (1), North Punjab (Gujrat, Jhelum and Rawalpindi) (1), North- West Punjab (Attock, Mianwali, Shahpur and Jhang) (1), South-West Punjab (Multan, Montgomery, Muzaffargarh and Dera Ghazi Khan) (1); Sikh (2): East Punjab (Ambala and Jullundur Division) (1), West Punjab (Lahore, Rawalpindi and Multan) (1); Punjab Landholders (1)
United Provinces	16	General (8) Cities of UP (Agra, Meerut, Cawnpore, Benares, Allahabad, Bareilly, Lucknow) (1), Meerut Division (excluding Municipality and Cantonment) (1), Agra Division (1), Rohilkhand and Kumaon Division (1), Allahabad Jhansi Division (1), Benares Gorakhpur Division (1), Lucknow Division (1), Faizabad Division (1); Muslim (6): Cities of U.P (1), Meerut Division (1), Agra (1), Rohilkhand and Kumaon Division (1), Lucknow and Faizabad (1), Southern Division (Allahabad, Benares, Gorakhpur) (1); European U. P. (1); Landholders U P (1)

The Government of India Act 1935 introduced further reforms. The Assembly continued as the lower chamber of a central Indian parliament based in Delhi, with two chambers, both containing elected and appointed members. The Assembly increased in size to 250 seats for members elected by the constituencies of British India, plus a further 125 seats for the Indian Princely states. However, elections for the reformed legislature never took place.

== Inauguration ==
The Central Legislative Assembly met in the Council Hall and later to the Viceregal Lodge in Old Delhi both of which are now located in Delhi University. A new "Council House" was conceived in 1919 as the seat of the future Legislative Assembly, the Council of State, and the Chamber of Princes. The foundation stone was laid on 12 February 1921 and the building was opened on 18 January 1927 by Lord Irwin, the Viceroy and Governor-General. The Council House later changed its name to Parliament House, or Sansad Bhavan, and was the home of the Parliament of India until 19 September 2023, having been converted into a museum.

The Assembly, the Council of State, and the Chamber of Princes were officially opened in 1921 by King George V's uncle, the Duke of Connaught and Strathearn

== Elections ==
The first elections to the new legislatures took place in November 1920 and proved to be the first significant contest between the Moderates and the Non-cooperation movement, whose aim was for the elections to fail. The Non-cooperators were at least partly successful in this, as out of almost a million electors for the Assembly, only some 182,000 voted.

After the withdrawal of the non-cooperation movement, a group within the Indian National Congress formed the Swaraj Party and contested the elections in 1923 and 1926. The Swaraj Party led by Motilal Nehru as the leader of the Opposition was able to secure the defeat, or at least the delay, of finance bills and other legislation. However, after 1926, the members of the Swaraj Party either joined the government or returned to the Congress which continued its boycott of the legislature during the Civil Disobedience Movement.

In 1934, the Congress ended its boycott of the legislatures and contested the elections to the fifth Central Legislative Assembly held that year.

The last elections to the assembly were held in 1945.

The electorate of the Assembly was never more than a very small fraction of the population of India. In the British House of Commons on 10 November 1942, the Labour MP Seymour Cocks asked the Secretary of State for India Leo Amery "What is the electorate for the present Central Legislative Assembly?" and received the written answer "The total electorate for the last General Election (1934) for the Central Legislative Assembly was 1,415,892."

== Important events ==
- In March 1926, Motilal Nehru demanded a representative conference to draft a constitution conferring full Dominion status on India, to be enacted by the parliament. When this demand was rejected by the Assembly, Nehru and his colleagues walked out of the house.
- On 8 April 1929, the Indian revolutionaries Bhagat Singh and Batukeshwar Dutt threw a bomb into the corridors of the Assembly in order to show their discontent and frustration against the British government's decision to enact the Trade Disputes Bill and the Public Safety Bill. The bomb explosion was followed by a shower of leaflets citing their reasons and ideology behind the act and few gunshots in the air, shouting "Inquilab Zindabad!" ("Long Live the Revolution!"). A few members were injured such as George Ernest Schuster (the finance member of the Viceroy's Executive Council), Sir Bomanji A. Dalal, P. Raghavendra Rau, Shankar Rao and S. N. Roy. The revolutionaries surrendered themselves and the weapon without any resistance as per plan instead of escaping. On 12 June 1929 they were sentenced to Penal transportation for the bombing, having defended the case themselves.
- Due to the return of the Congress in 1934 as the main opposition, there was a sharp increase in the number of government defeats in the Assembly. In a British House of Commons debate on 4 April 1935, the Secretary of State for India, Samuel Hoare, stated that "The number of divisions in the Legislative Assembly since the recent elections and up to the 25th March in which Government have been successful is five. The number of adverse divisions in the same period is seventeen." Henry Page Croft then asked "Can the right hon. Gentleman say whether the Government would have been successful on any occasion without the support of the nominated members?" Hoare replied "I could not answer that question without looking into the figures, but in any case I see no reason to differentiate between one class of member and another."
- In 1936 during the Arab revolt in Palestine, Indian troops were sent there. In the Assembly, the Viceroy, Lord Linlithgow, disallowed all questions and resolutions which asked him to express the concern of Indian Muslims about the position of Arabs in Palestine.
- On 27 February 1942, during the Second World War, the Assembly held a secret session to discuss the war situation.

== Presidents of the Assembly ==
The presiding officer (or speaker) of the Assembly was called the President. While the Government of India Act 1919 provided for the President to be elected, it made an exception in the case of the first President, who was to be appointed by the Government. The Governor-General appointed Frederick Whyte, a former Liberal member of the British House of Commons who had been a parliamentary private secretary to Winston Churchill. Sachchidananda Sinha was the Deputy President of Assembly in 1921.

Ganesh Vasudev Mavlankar was the last President of the Assembly till the Assembly came to an end on 14 August 1947. He became the first Speaker of the Constituent Assembly of India, and in 1952 the first Speaker of the Lok Sabha, the lower house of the Parliament of India.

No	Image	President	Tenure
1		Sir Frederick Whyte	3 February 1921 – 23 August 1925
2		Vithalbhai Patel	24 August 1925 – April 1930
3		Muhammad Yakub	9 July 1930 – 31 July 1931
4		Sir Ibrahim Rahimtoola	17 January 1931 – 7 March 1933
5		Sir Ramasamy Shanmukham Chetty	14 March 1933 – 31 December 1934
6		Sir Abdur Rahim	24 January 1935 – 1 October 1945
7		Ganesh Vasudev Mavlankar	24 January 1946 – 14 August 1947

No	Image	Deputy President	Tenure
1		Dr Sachchidananda Sinha	February 1921 – September 1921
2		Sir Jamsetjee Jejeebhoy	September 1921 – 1923
3		T. Rangachari	February 1924 – 1926
4		Muhammad Yakub	January 1927 – 1930
5		Hari Singh Gour	July 1930
6		R. K. Shanmukham Chetty	January 1931 – March 1933
7		Abdul Matin Chaudhury	March 1933 – 1934
8		Akhil Chandra Datta	February 1934 – 1945
9		Muhammad Yamin Khan	February 1946 – 1947

== Notable members ==
- Labour Interests: N. M. Joshi
- Depressed Classes: M. C. Rajah, N. Sivaraj
- Bihar & Orissa: Madhusudan Das, Sachchidananda Sinha, Nilakantha Das, Anugrah Narayan Sinha
- Assam: Khan Bahadur Gulam Mostofa Chowdhury
- Bengal: Khwaja Habibullah, Kshitish Chandra Neogy, Gurusaday Dutt, Satyendra Chandra Mitra, Abdullah Al-Mamun Suhrawardy, Amarendra Chatterjee, Renuka Ray.
- Bombay: Sir Jamsetjee Jejeebhoy, Seth Harchandrai Vishandas, Vithalbhai Patel, N. C. Kelkar, Muhammad Ali Jinnah, Kasturbhai Lalbhai, M. R. Jayakar, Wahid Baksh Bhutto, Sir Jehangir Cowasji, Bhulabhai Desai, Abdullah Haroon, Homi Mody, Keshavrao Jedhe, Narhar Vishnu Gadgil, Narasimha Chintaman Kelkar
- Central Provinces & Berar: Hari Singh Gour, Seth Govind Das, B. S. Moonje, M. S. Aney, Narayan Bhaskar Khare, Barrister Ramrao Deshmukh, Rao Bahadur Dinkarrao Rajurkar
- Delhi: Asaf Ali
- Madras: T. V. Seshagiri Iyer, P. S. Kumaraswamy Raja, P. S. Sivaswami Iyer, Muhammad Habibullah, T. Rangachari, R. K. Shanmukham Chetty, A. Rangaswami Iyengar, M. Ct. M. Chidambaram Chettyar, S. Srinivasa Iyengar, Tanguturi Prakasam, Madabhushi Ananthasayanam Ayyangar, V. V. Giri, Arcot Ramasamy Mudaliar, S. Satyamurti, N. G. Ranga, Kasinathuni Nageswara Rao, Addepally Satyanarayana Murthy, T. S. Avinashilingam Chettiar, C. N. Muthuranga Mudaliar, T. S. S. Rajan, Sami Venkatachalam Chetty, Ramakrishna Ranga Rao of Bobbili, Kasturiranga Santhanam
- NWFP: Sahibzada Abdul Qayyum, Khan Abdul Jabbar Khan
- Punjab: Lala Lajpat Rai, Mian Sir Muhammad Shah Nawaz, Bhai Parmanand
- United Provinces: Motilal Nehru, Madan Mohan Malaviya, C. S. Ranga Iyer, H. N. Kunzru, Ghanshyam Das Birla, Bhagwan Das, Govind Ballabh Pant, Sri Prakasa, Muhammad Yamin Khan, Mohammad Ismail Khan, Ziauddin Ahmad, Liaquat Ali Khan, Rafi Ahmed Kidwai

== Dissolution ==
As per the Indian Independence Act 1947, the Central Legislative Assembly and the Council of States ceased to exist and the Constituent Assembly of India became the central legislature of India.

== See also ==
- Viceroy's Executive Council
- Council of State (India)
- Imperial Legislative Council
- Interim Government of India
