= Swaraj Party =

- Leader: Chittaranjan Das
- Secretary: Motilal Nehru, Birendranath Sasmal, Vithalbhai Patel
- Founder: Chittaranjan Das, Motilal Nehru
- Founded: 1 January 1923; 103 years ago
- Dissolved: 1935; 91 years ago
- Split from: Indian National Congress
- Merged into: Indian National Congress
- Colours: Sandal

The Swaraj Party, established as the Congress-Khilafat Swaraj Party, was a political party formed in India on 1 January 1923 after the Gaya annual conference in December 1922.

== Chauri Chaura ==
The Swaraj Party was formed on 1 January 1923 by Indian politicians and members of the Indian National Congress who had opposed Mahatma Gandhi's suspension of all civil resistance on 12 February 1922 in response to the Chauri Chaura tragedy, where policemen were killed by a mob of protestors. Gandhi felt responsible for the killings, reproached himself for not emphasizing nonviolence more firmly, and feared that the entire Non-Cooperation Movement could degenerate into an orgy of violence between the British-controlled army and police and mobs of freedom-fighters, alienating and hurting millions of common Indians. He went on a fast-unto-death to convince all Indians to stop civil resistance. The Congress and other nationalist groups disavowed all activities of disobedience.

However, many Indians felt that the Non-Cooperation Movement should not have been suspended over an isolated incident of violence, and that its astonishing success was actually close to breaking the back of British rule in India. These people became disillusioned with Gandhi's political judgments and instincts.

== Council entry ==
Gandhi and most of the Congress party rejected the provincial and central legislative councils created by the British to offer some participation for Indians. They argued that the councils were rigged with un-elected allies of the British, and too un-democratic and simply "rubber stamps" of the Viceroy.

In December 1922, Chittaranjan Das, Narasimha Chintaman Kelkar and Motilal Nehru formed the Congress-Khilafat Swarajaya Party with Das as the president and Nehru as one of the secretaries. Other prominent leaders included Huseyn Shaheed Suhrawardy, Birendranath Sasmal and Subhas Chandra Bose of Bengal, Vithalbhai Patel and other Congress leaders who were becoming dissatisfied with the Congress. The other group was the 'No-Changers', who had accepted Gandhi's decision to withdraw the movement.

Now both the Swarajists and the No-Changers were engaged in a fierce political struggle, but both were determined to avoid the disastrous experience of the 1907 split at Surat. On the advice of Gandhi, the two groups decided to remain in the Congress but to work in their separate ways. There was no basic difference between the two.

In the 1923 Indian general election, Swarajist members (45/145) were elected to the councils. Vithalbhai Patel became the president of the Central Legislative Assembly.

At a meeting on 30 December 1923, the general council of the party demanded the establishment of fully responsible government for India. They demanded that the government start by releasing political prisoners, suspending all repressive laws and orders, and convening a round table conference to negotiate the principles of a constitution for India.

However, the legislatures had very limited powers, and apart from some heated parliamentary debates, and procedural stand-offs with the British authorities, the core mission of obstructing British rule failed.

With the death of Chittaranjan Das in 1925, and with Motilal Nehru's return to the Congress the following year, the Swaraj Party was greatly weakened.

== Pro-Changers and No-Changers, and the Simon Commission ==
After his release from prison in 1924, Gandhi sought to bring back the Swarajists to the Congress and re-unite the party. Gandhi's supporters were in a vast majority in the Congress, and the Congress still remained India's largest political party, but Gandhi felt it necessary to heal the divide with the Swarajists, so as to heal the nation's wounds over the 1922 suspension.

The Swarajists sought more representation in the Congress offices, and an end to the mandatory requirement for Congressmen to spin khadi cloth and do social service as a prerequisite for office. This was opposed by Gandhi's supporters, men like Vallabhbhai Patel, Jawaharlal Nehru and Rajendra Prasad, who became known as the No Changers as opposed to the Swarajist Changers. Gandhi relaxed the rules on spinning and named some Swarajists to important positions in the Congress Party. He also encouraged the Congress to support those Swarajists elected to the councils, so as not to embarrass them and leave them rudderless before the British authorities.

When the Simon Commission arrived in India in 1928, millions of Indians were infuriated with the idea of an all-British committee writing proposals for Indian constitutional reforms without any Indian member or consultations with the Indian people. The Congress created a committee to write Indian proposals for constitutional reforms, headed by now Congress President Motilal Nehru. The death of Lala Lajpat Rai, beaten by police in Punjab further infuriated India. People rallied around the Nehru Report and old political divisions and wounds were forgotten, and Vithalbhai Patel and all Swarajist councillors resigned in protest.

Between 1929 and 1937, the Indian National Congress would declare the independence of India and launch the Salt Satyagraha. In this tumultuous period, the Swaraj Party was defunct as its members quietly dissolved into the Congress fold.

== Madras Province Swarajya Party ==
The Madras Province Swarajya Party was established in 1923. S. Satyamurti and S. Srinivasa Iyengar led the party. The party contested in all provincial elections between 1923 and 1934 with the exception of the 1930 election which it did not participate officially due to the Civil Disobedience Movement, though some of the members of the party contested for office as independents. The party emerged as the single largest party in the 1926 and 1934 Assembly elections but refused to form the provincial government under the existing diarchy system. In 1934, the Madras Province Swarajya Party merged with the All India Swarajya Party which subsequently merged with the Indian National Congress when it contested the 1935 elections to the Imperial Legislative Council under the Government of India Act 1935.

From 1935 onward, the Swarajya Party ceased to exist and was succeeded by the Indian National Congress in the elections to the Imperial Legislative Council as well as the Madras Legislative Council.

Presidents of the Madras Province Swarajya Party	Term start	Term end
S. Srinivasa Iyengar	1923	1930
Sathyamurthy	1930	1935

=== Performance of the Madras Provincial Swarajya Party ===
Elections	Seats in Madras Assembly	Assembly Seats won	Total number of Council seats	Members nominated to the council	Result	Party President
1923	98	20	29			
1926	98	41	34			S. Srinivasa Iyengar
1930	Did not participate in the elections due to Civil Disobedience Movement					
1934	98		29			

== See also ==
- Free Press of India
- Indian Nationalism
- K.M. Munshi
- Abdul Hameed Khan
