= Round Table Conferences (India) =

Meetings held as a prelude to Government of India Act 1935

The three Round Table Conferences of 1930–1932 were a series of peace conferences, organized by the British Government and Indian political personalities to discuss constitutional reforms in India. These started in November 1930 and ended in December 1932. They were conducted as per the recommendation of Muhammad Ali Jinnah to Viceroy Lord Irwin and Prime Minister Ramsay MacDonald, and by the report submitted by the Simon Commission in May 1930. Demands for Swaraj or self-rule in India had been growing increasingly strong. B. R. Ambedkar, Jinnah, Sir Tej Bahadur Sapru, V. S. Srinivasa Sastri, Sir Muhammad Zafrulla Khan, K. T. Paul and Mirabehn were key participants from India. By the 1930s, many British politicians believed that India needed to move towards dominion status. However, there were significant disagreements between the Indian and the British political parties that the Conferences would not resolve. The key topic was about constitution and India which was mainly discussed in that conference. There were three Round Table Conferences from 1930 to 1932.

== First Round Table Conference (November 1930 – January 1931) ==
The Round Table Conference officially inaugurated by George V on November 12, 1930 at Royal Gallery House of Lords in London and chaired by the Prime Minister. Ramsay MacDonald was also chairman of a subcommittee on minority representation, while for the duration his son, Malcolm MacDonald, performed liaison tasks with Lord Sankey's constitutional committee. One of the foremost advisers was Sir Malcolm Hailey, an Indian civil servant with thirty years experience. The leading Liberal on the committee, Lord Reading was "well aware of the troubles which might arise if and when India became independent." Clement Attlee, who served on the Simon Commission, wanted an early resolution but was baulked by the Conservatives in government until 1945. Sir Samuel Hoare wrote the cabinet a memo recommending a federal formula for the Government of India to "make it possible to give a semblance of responsible government and yet retain the realities and verities of British control." The idea was proposed by the princely states and other Liberal Indian leaders including Sir Tej Bahadur Sapru would welcome it. The minority Labour government hoped to win the support of Liberal and Conservative colleagues in parliament for a "responsive" Indian government at central and provincial levels and a conservative legislature.

The eight British political parties were represented by sixteen delegates. There were fifty-eight political leaders from British India and sixteen delegates from the princely states. In total 74 delegates from India attended the Conference. However, the Indian National Congress, along with Indian business leaders, kept away from the conference. Many of them, including Gandhi, were in jail for their participation in Civil Disobedience Movement. Their boycott doomed the conference to failure. Lord Irwin made a controversial statement declaring that India should be eventually granted Dominionship. The Conservatives were disgusted: "the whole conference was manipulated and manoeuvred by the Socialist Party", said Sir Winston Churchill, "to achieve the result they had set before themselves from the beginning, namely the conferring of responsible government at the centre upon Indians."

=== Participants ===
- British Representatives:
  - Labour: Ramsay MacDonald, Lord Sankey, Wedgwood Benn, Arthur Henderson, J. H. Thomas, William Jowitt, Hastings Lees-Smith, Earl Russell
  - Conservative: Earl Peel, Marquess of Zetland, Samuel Hoare, Oliver Stanley
  - Liberal: Marquess of Reading, Marquess of Lothian, Sir Robert Hamilton, Isaac Foot
- Muslim League: Aga Khan III (Note: Attended all three conferences) (leader of British-Indian delegation), Muhammad Ali Jinnah, Maulana Mohammad Ali Jauhar, Muhammad Shafi, Muhammad Zafarullah Khan, Sir Abdul Halim Ghuznavi, Sir Ghulam Hussain Hidayatullah, AK Fazlul Huq, Dr. Shafa'at Ahmad Khan, Raja Sher Muhammad Khan of Domeli
- Indian States' Representatives: Maharaja of Alwar, Maharaja of Baroda, Maharaja of Darbhanga, Nawab of Bhopal, Maharaja of Bikaner, Rana of Dholpur, Maharaja of Jammu and Kashmir, Maharaja of Nawanagar, Maharaja of Patiala (Chancellor of the Chamber of Princes), Maharaja of Rewa, Chief Sahib of Sangli, Sir Prabhashankar Pattani (Bhavnagar), Manubhai Mehta (Baroda), Sardar Sahibzada Sultan Ahmed Khan (Gwalior), Akbar Hydari (Hyderabad), Mirza Ismail (Mysore), Kailash Narain Haksar (Jammu and Kashmir)
- British-Indian Representatives:
  - Hindus: B. S. Moonje, M. R. Jayakar, Diwan Bahadur Raja Narendra Nath
  - Liberals: J. N. Basu, Tej Bahadur Sapru, C. Y. Chintamani, V. S. Srinivasa Sastri, Chimanlal Harilal Setalvad
  - Justice Party: Arcot Ramasamy Mudaliar, Bhaskarrao Vithojirao Jadhav, Sir A. P. Patro
  - Depressed Classes: B. R. Ambedkar, Rettamalai Srinivasan
  - Sikhs: Sardar Ujjal Singh, Sardar Sampuran Singh
  - Parsis: Phiroze Sethna, Cowasji Jehangir, Homi Mody
  - Indian Christians: K. T. Paul (All India Conference of Indian Christians)
  - Europeans: Sir Hubert Carr, Sir Oscar de Glanville (Burma), T. F. Gavin Jones, C. E. Wood (Madras)
  - Anglo-Indians: Henry Gidney
  - Women: Begum Jahanara Shahnawaz, Radhabai Subbarayan
  - Landlords: Maharaja Kameshwar Singh of Darbhanga (Bihar), Muhammad Ahmad Said Khan Chhatari (United Provinces), Maharaja of Paralakhemundi Estate (Orissa) Krushna Chandra Gajapati, Provash Chandra Mitter
  - Labour: N. M. Joshi, B. Shiva Rao
  - Universities: Syed Sultan Ahmed, Bisheshwar Dayal Seth
  - Burma: U Aung Thin, Ba U, M. M. Ohn Ghine
  - Sindh: Shah Nawaz Bhutto, Ghulam Hussain Hidayatullah
  - Other Provinces: Chandradhar Barua (Assam), Sahibzada Abdul Qayyum (NWFP), S. B. Tambe (Central Provinces)
  - Government of India: Narendra Nath Law, Bhupendra Nath Mitra, C. P. Ramaswami Iyer, M. Ramachandra Rao
- Officials attending in consultative capacity: W. M. Hailey, C. A. Innes, A. C. MacWatters, Sir Henry G. Haig, L. W. Reynolds
- Indian States Delegation Staff:
  - Hyderabad: Sir Richard Chenevix-Trench, Nawab Mahdi Yar Jung, Ahmed Hussain, Nawab Sir Amin Jung Bahadur, Reginald Glancy
  - South Indian States: T. Raghavaiah
  - Baroda: V. T. Krishnamachari
  - Alwar: Fateh Naseeb Khan
  - Orissa States: K. C. Neogy
  - Nominated by the Chamber of Princes Special Organisation: L. F. Rushbrook Williams, Qazi Ali Haidar Abbasi, Jarmani Dass, Anna Babaji Latthe, D. A. Surve
- Secretariats: S. K. Brown, V. Dawson, K. S. Fitze, W. H. Lewis, R. J. Stopford, John Coatman, Marmaduke Pickthall, K. M. Panikkar, N. S. Subba Rao, Geoffrey Corbett, A. Latifi, Girija Shankar Bajpai
- Secretariat-General: R. H. A. Carter, Mian Abdul Aziz, W. D. Croft, G. E. J. Gent, B. G. Holdsworth, R. F. Mudie, G. S. Rajadhyaksha

=== Proceedings ===
The conference started with six plenary meetings where delegates put forward their issues nine sub-committees were formed to deal with several different matters including federal structure, provincial constitution, province of Sindh and NWFP, defense services and minorities e.t.c. These were followed by discussions on the reports of the sub-committees on Federal Structure, Provincial Constitution, Minorities, Burma, North West Frontier Province, Franchise, Defense services and Sindh. These were followed by 2 more plenary meetings and a final concluding session. It was difficult for progress to be made in the absence of the Indian National Congress but some advances were made. The Prime Minister wrote his diary "India has not considered. It was communalism and proportions of reserved seats" that exposed the worst side of Indian politics.

The idea of an All-India Federation was moved to the centre of discussion by Tej Bahadur Sapru. All the groups attending the conference supported this concept. The princely states agreed to the proposed federation provided that their internal sovereignty was guaranteed. The Muslim League also supported the federation as it had always been opposed to a strong Centre. The British agreed that representative government should be introduced on provincial level.

== Second Round Table Conference (September 1931 – December 1931) ==
After the failure of the First Round Table Conference, the British recognized they needed the participation of the Indian National Congress. On January 26, 1931, Gandhi and other Congress leaders were freed from prison. The resulting discussions culminated in the Gandhi–Irwin Pact (1931) under which the Congress agreed to participate in a Second Round Table Conference. Although MacDonald was still Prime Minister of Britain, he was by this time heading a coalition Government (the "National Government") with a Conservative majority, including Sir Samuel Hoare as a new Secretary of State for India.

=== Participants ===
- British Representatives:
  - Labour: Ramsay MacDonald, Wedgwood Benn, Arthur Henderson, William Jowitt, Hastings Lees-Smith, F. W. Pethick-Lawrence, Lord Sankey, Lord Snell, J. H. Thomas
  - Conservative: Viscount Hailsham, Samuel Hoare, Earl Peel, Oliver Stanley, Marquess of Zetland
  - Scottish Unionist: Walter Elliot
  - Liberal: Isaac Foot, Henry Graham White, Robert Hamilton, Marquess of Lothian, Marquess of Reading,
- Indian States' Representatives: Maharaja of Alwar, Maharaja of Baroda, Maharaja Of Darbhanga, Nawab of Bhopal, Maharaja of Bikaner, Maharao of Kutch, Rana of Dholpur, Maharaja of Indore, Maharaja of Jammu and Kashmir, Maharaja of Kapurthala, Maharaja of Nawanagar, Maharaja of Patiala, Maharaja of Rewa, Chief Sahib of Sangli, Raja of Korea, Raja of Sarila, Sir Prabhashankar Pattani (Bhavnagar), Manubhai Mehta (Baroda), Sardar Sahibzada Sultan Ahmed Khan (Gwalior), Sir Muhammad Akbar Hydari (Hyderabad), Mirza Ismail (Mysore), Col. K.N. Haksar (Jammu and Kashmir), T. Raghavaiah (Travancore), Liaqat Hayat Khan (Patiala)
- British-Indian Representatives:
  - Government of India: C. P. Ramaswami Iyer, Narendra Nath Law, M. Ramachandra Rao
  - Indian National Congress: Mahatma Gandhi (He was the sole representative of the Congress).
  - Muslims: Aga Khan III, Maulana Shaukat Ali, Muhammad Ali Jinnah, A. K. Fazlul Huq, Sir Muhammad Iqbal, Muhammad Shafi, Muhammad Zafarullah Khan, Sir Syed Ali Imam, Maulvi Muhammad Shafi Daudi, Raja Sher Muhammad Khan of Domeli, Abdul Halim Ghaznavi, Hafiz Hidayat Hussain, Sayed Muhammad Padshah Saheb Bahadur, Dr. Shafa'at Ahmad Khan, Jamal Muhammad Rowther, Kaja Mian Rowther, Nawab Sahibzada Sayed Muhammad Mehr Shah
  - Hindus: M. R. Jayakar, B. S. Moonje, Diwan Bahadur Raja Narendra Nath
  - Liberals: J. N. Basu, C. Y. Chintamani, Tej Bahadur Sapru, V. S. Srinivasa Sastri, Chimanlal Harilal Setalvad
  - Justice Party: Raja of Bobbili, Arcot Ramasamy Mudaliar, Sir A. P. Patro, Bhaskarrao Vithojirao Jadhav
  - Depressed Classes: B. R. Ambedkar, Rettamalai Srinivasan
  - Sikhs: Sardar Ujjal Singh, Sardar Sampuran Singh
  - Parsis: Cowasji Jehangir, Homi Mody, Phiroze Sethna
  - Indian Christians: Surendra Kumar Datta, A. T. Pannirselvam
  - Europeans: Edward Benthall, Sir Hubert Carr, T. F. Gavin Jones, C. E. Wood (Madras)
  - Anglo-Indians: Henry Gidney
  - Women: Sarojini Naidu, Begum Jahanara Shahnawaz, Radhabai Subbarayan
  - Landlords: Muhammad Ahmad Said Khan Chhatari (United Provinces), Kameshwar Singh of Darbhanga (Bihar), Raja of Parlakimedi (Orissa), Sir Provash Chandra Mitter
  - Industry: Ghanshyam Das Birla, Sir Purshottamdas Thakurdas, Maneckji Dadabhoy
  - Labour: N. M. Joshi, B. Shiva Rao, V. V. Giri
  - Universities: Syed Sultan Ahmed, Bisheshwar Dayal Seth
  - Burma: Sir Padamji Ginwala
  - Sindh: Shah Nawaz Bhutto, Ghulam Hussain Hidayatullah
  - Other Provinces: Chandradhar Barua (Assam), Sahibzada Abdul Qayyum (NWFP), S. B. Tambe (Central Provinces)
- Indian States Delegation Staff: V. T. Krishnamachari (Baroda), Richard Chenevix-Trench (Hyderabad), Nawab Mahdi Yar Jung (Hyderabad), S. M. Bapna (Indore), Amar Nath Atal (Jaipur), J. W. Young (Jodhpur), Ram Chandra Kak (Jammu and Kashmir), Sahibzada Abdus Samad Khan (Rampur), K. C. Neogy (Orissa states), L. F. Rushbrook Williams, Jarmani Dass, Muhammad Saleh Akbar Hydari, K. M. Panikkar, N. Madhava Rao
- British Delegation Staff: H. G. Haig, V. Dawson, K. S. Fitze, J. G. Laithwaite, W. H. Lewis, P. J. Patrick, John Coatman, G. T. Garratt, R. J. Stopford
- British Indian Delegation Staff: Geoffrey Corbett, A. Latifi, Girija Shankar Bajpai, Benegal Rama Rau, Syed Amjad Ali, Prince Aly Khan, A. M. Chaudhury, Mahadev Desai, Govind Malaviya, K. T. Shah, P. Sinha
- Secretariat-General: R. H. A. Carter, K. Anderson, C. D. Deshmukh, J. M. Sladen, Hugh MacGregor, G. F. Steward, A. H. Joyce, Syed Amjad Ali, Ram Babu Saksena

=== Proceedings ===
The Second Session opened on September 7, 1931. There were three major differences between the first and second Round Table Conferences. By the second:

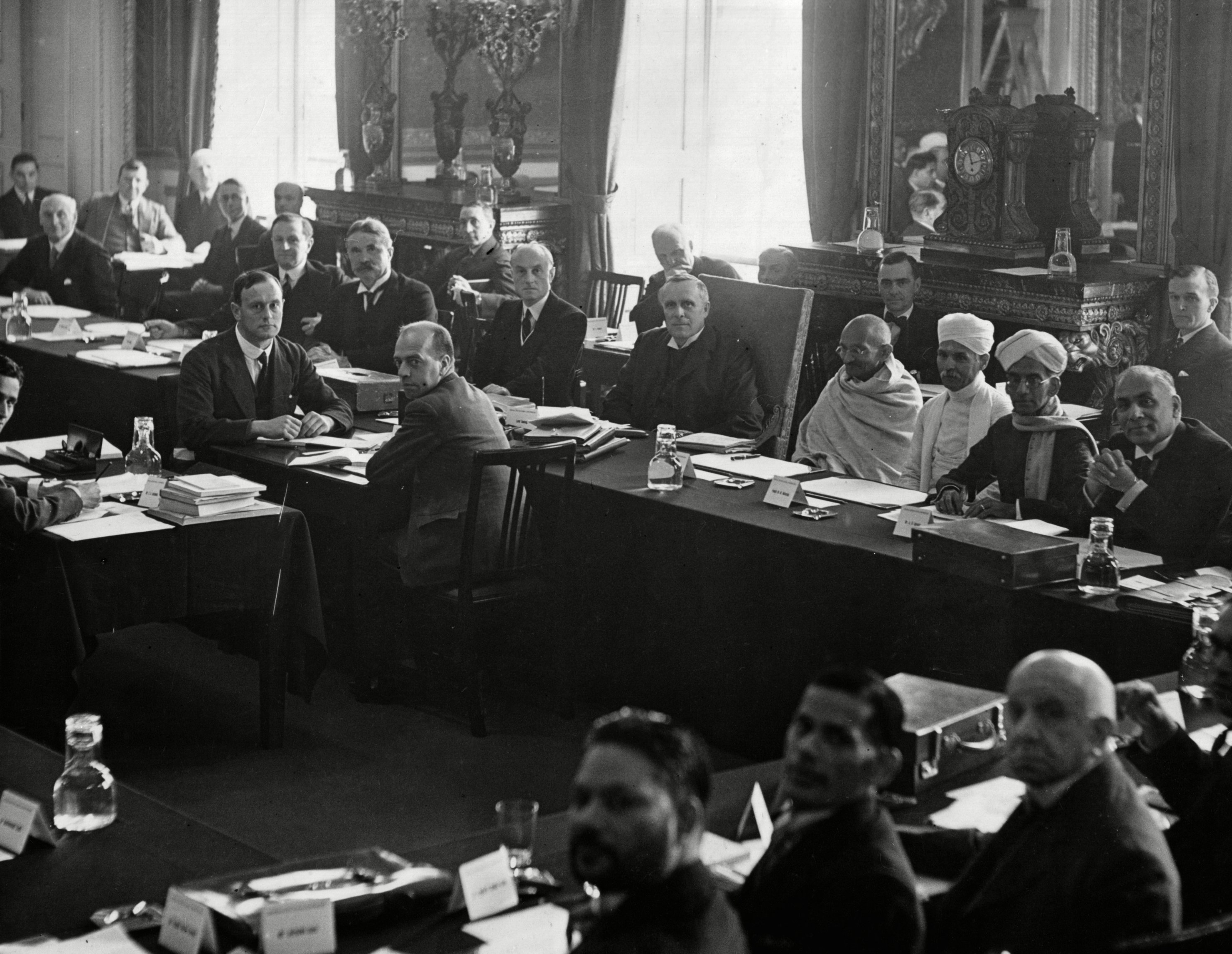
The Second Round Table Conference (September 7, 1931)

- Congress Representation — The Gandhi–Irwin Pact opened the way for Congress participation in this conference. Gandhi was invited from India and attended as the sole official Congress representative accompanied by Sarojini Naidu and also Madan Mohan Malaviya, Ghanshyam Das Birla, Muhammad Iqbal, Sir Mirza Ismail (Diwan of Mysore), S.K. Dutta and Sir Syed Ali Imam. Gandhi claimed that the Congress alone represented political India; that the Untouchables were Hindus and should not be treated as a “minority”; and that there should be no separate electorates or special safeguards for Muslims or other minorities. These claims were rejected by other Indian participants.
- National Government — two weeks earlier the Labour government in London had fallen. Ramsay MacDonald now headed a National Government dominated by the Conservative Party.
- Financial Crisis – During the conference, Britain went off the Gold Standard, further distracting the National Government.

At the end of the conference Ramsay MacDonald undertook to produce a Communal Award for minority representation, with the provision that any free agreement between the parties could be substituted for his award.

Gandhi took particular exception to the suggestion of untouchables as a minority separate from the rest of the Hindu community. Other important discussions were the responsibility of the executive to the legislature and a separate electorate for the Untouchables as demanded by Dr. B. R. Ambedkar. Gandhi announced that henceforth he would work only on behalf of the Harijans: he reached a compromise with the leader of depressed classes, Dr. B. R. Ambedkar, over this issue; the two eventually resolved the situation with the Poona Pact of 1932. But not before the conference of All-India Depressed Classes had specifically 'denounced the claim made by Mahatma Gandhi.'

== Third Round Table Conference (November 1932 – December 1932) ==
The third and last session assembled on November 17, 1932. Only forty-six delegates attended since most of the main political figures of India were not present. The Labour Party from Britain and the Indian National Congress refused to attend.

From September 1931 until March 1933, under the supervision of the Secretary of State for India, Sir Samuel Hoare, the proposed reforms took the form reflected in the Government of India Act 1935.

=== Participants ===
- Indian States' Representatives: Dewan Kishen Pershad (Dewan of Hyderabad), Mirza Ismail (Dewan of Mysore), V. T. Krishnamachari (Dewan of Baroda), Wajahat Hussain (Jammu and Kashmir), Sir Sukhdeo Prasad (Udaipur, Jaipur, Jodhpur), D. A. Surve (Kolhapur), Raja Oudh Narain Bisarya (Bhopal), Manubhai Mehta (Bikaner), Nawab Liaqat Hayat Khan (Patiala), Fateh Naseeb Khan (Alwar State), L. F. Rushbrook Williams (Nawanagar), Raja of Sarila (small states)
- British-Indian Representatives: Aga Khan III, Sir Dr. Allama Muhammad Iqbal, B. R. Ambedkar (Depressed Classes separate Electorate), Ramakrishna Ranga Rao of Bobbili, Sir Hubert Carr (Europeans), Nanak Chand Pandit, A. H. Ghuznavi, Henry Gidney (Anglo-Indians), Hafiz Hidayat Hussain (All India Muslim League), M. R. Jayakar (Liberal Party), Cowasji Jehangir(Liberal Party), N. M. Joshi (Hindu Mahasabha), Narasimha Chintaman Kelkar, Arcot Ramasamy Mudaliar, Begum Jahanara Shahnawaz (Women), A. P. Patro, Tej Bahadur Sapru, Dr. Shafa'at Ahmad Khan, Sir Shadi Lal, Tara Singh Malhotra, Sir Nripendra Nath Sircar, Sir Purshottamdas Thakurdas, Muhammad Zafarullah Khan.

=== Proceedings ===
Similar to the first two Round Table Conferences, the Third Round Table Conference did not turn out to be fruitful or inclusive.

== Conclusion ==
A Joint Committee was set up and had to present the recommendations as a Bill, which was eventually enacted as the Government of India Act 1935.
