= Moropant Vishvanath Joshi =

Indian lawyer (1861–1962)

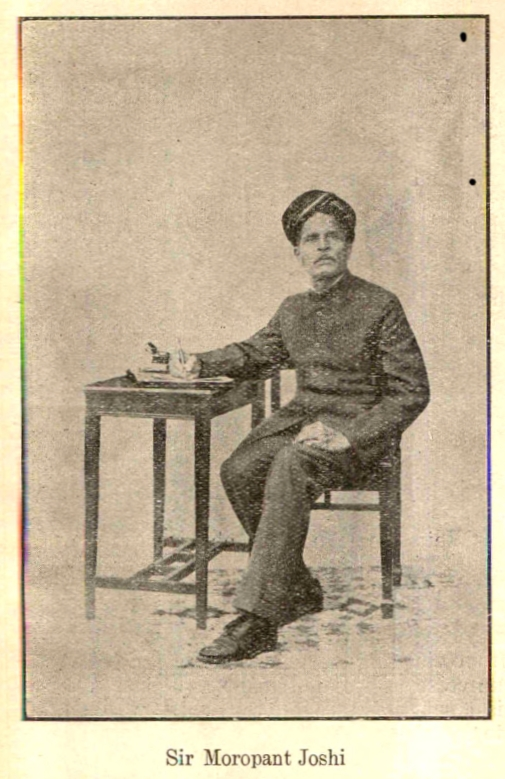

Sir Moropant Vishvanath Joshi KCIE (October 1861 – 1962) was a leading barrister, social reformer and politician from Amravati, Central Provinces and Berar.

Joshi was born in an eminent Chitpavan Brahmin family, the son of Vishvanath Raghunath Joshi. A Moderate leader, he joined the Indian Liberal Party when the Indian National Congress came under the leadership of Mahatma Gandhi.

Joshi was a member of the Central Provinces Legislative Council. When diarchy was introduced by the Government of India Act 1919, Joshi was made the home member in the governor's executive council. He was knighted in the 1923 Birthday Honours, and appointed a Knight Commander of the Order of the Indian Empire (KCIE) in the 1926 New Year Honours.

In 1925, the tenure of Moropant Joshi as home member from the Central Province was about to end. The governor of the province, Sir Montagu Butler offered Seth Govind Das the post, but he refused the offer and Mr S. B. Tambe from the Berar region was appointed.

Joshi was the chairman of the committee of ten, to which the Hindu Child Marriage Bill was referred and was passed as Child Marriage Restraint Act of 1929 on 28 September 1929.

His daughter Sarwasati (b. 3 June 1929) married Sir Chintamanrao Dhundirajrao Patwardhan, KCSI, KCIE Ruler of Sangli Princely State

Joshi retired in 1933 and died aged 101 in 1962.
