= V. S. Srinivasa Sastri =

Indian politician, administrator, educator, orator and Indian independence activist

The Right Honourable Valangaiman Sankaranarayana Srinivasa Sastri CH PC
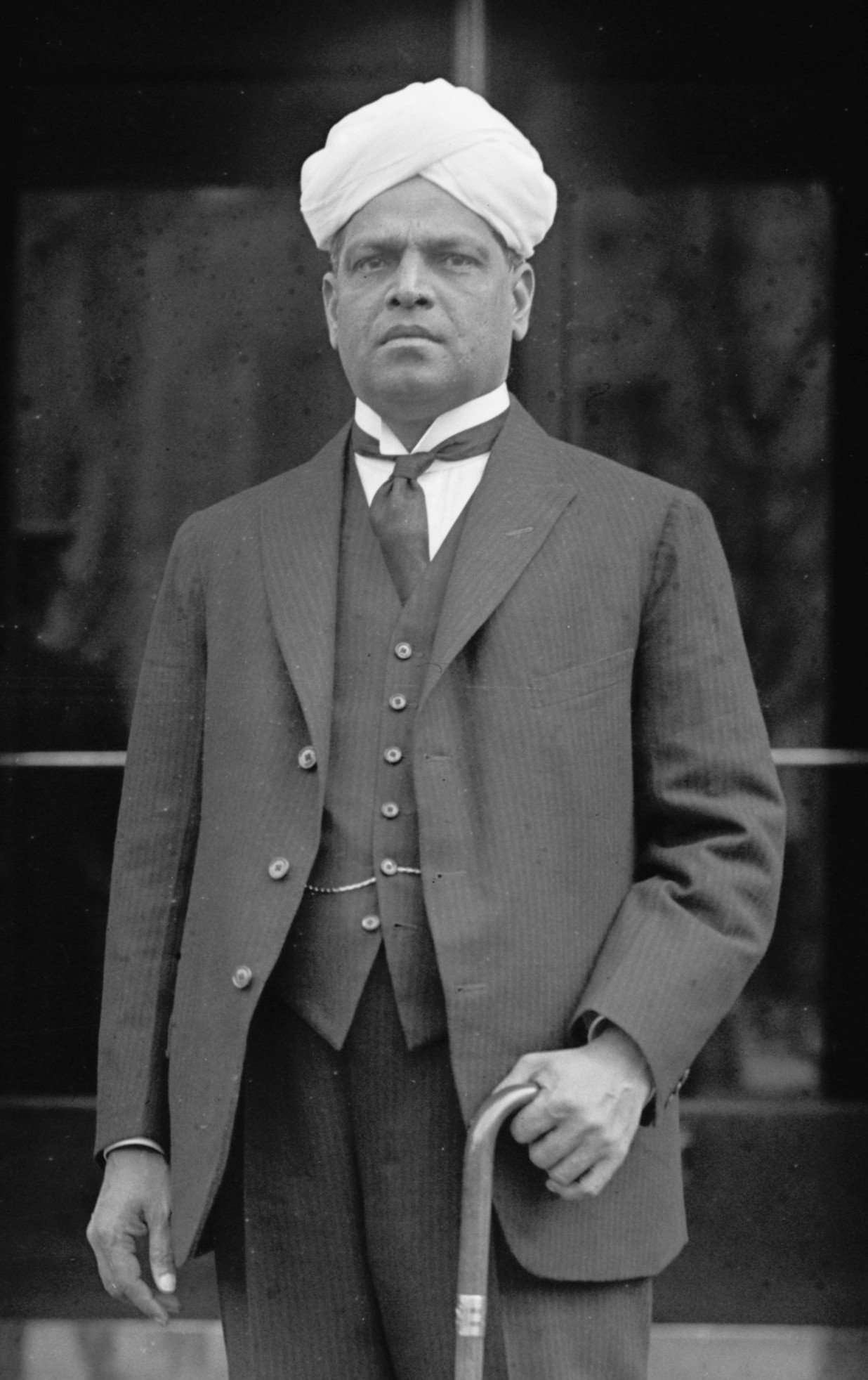
- V. S. Srinivasa Sastri in 1921

India's Agent to the Union of South Africa
- In office June 1927 – January 1929
- Monarch: George V
- Governor General: Edward Wood, 1st Earl of Halifax
- Preceded by: None
- Succeeded by: Kurma Venkata Reddy Naidu

Member of the Council of State
- In office 1920–1925
- Monarch: George V of the United Kingdom
- Governor General: Rufus Isaacs, 1st Marquess of Reading

Member of the Imperial Legislative Council of India
- In office 1916–1919
- Monarch: George V
- Governor-General: Frederic Thesiger, 1st Viscount Chelmsford

Personal details
- Born: 22 September 1869 Valangaiman, Tanjore district
- Died: 17 April 1946 (aged 76) Mylapore, Madras
- Party: Indian National Congress (1908–1922), Indian Liberal Party (1922–1946)
- Spouse: Parvathi
- Education: Native High School, Kumbakonam; Government College, Kumbakonam
- Occupation: headmaster
- Profession: educationist, orator, writer, politician, diplomat

Valangaiman Sankaranarayana Srinivasa Sastri CH PC (22 September 1869 – 17 April 1946) was an Indian politician, administrator, educator, orator and Indian independence activist. He was acclaimed for his oratory and command over the English language. Srinivasa Sastri was born to a poor temple priest in the village of Valangaiman near Kumbakonam, India. He completed his education at Kumbakonam and worked as a school teacher and later, headmaster in Triplicane, Madras. He entered politics in 1905 when he joined the Servants of India Society. Sastri served as a member of the Indian National Congress from 1908 to 1922, but later resigned in protest against the non-cooperation movement. Sastri was one of the founding members of the Indian Liberal Party. In his later days, he was strongly opposed to the partition of India.

Srinivasa Sastri served as a member of the Madras Legislative Council from 1913 to 1916, Imperial Legislative Council of India from 1916 to 1919 and the Council of State from 1920 to 1925. Sastri also functioned as India's delegate to the League of Nations, as member of the Privy Council of the United Kingdom and agent to the Union of South Africa.

Sastri gained worldwide fame for his prowess in the English language. He was a close follower of Gopal Krishna Gokhale. He was also a close friend and associate of Mahatma Gandhi, who addressed Sastri as his "elder brother" in writings. Sastri was appointed a Member of the Order of the Companions of Honour in 1930. In 1921, the Freedom of the City of London was conferred on him, and in 1931 he received the Freedom of the City of Edinburgh.

However, some members of the Indian freedom struggle such as Nehru felt that Sastri was too sympathetic to the British rulers, and too co-operative with them. This was especially apparent at the Round table conferences where Sastri and his party member agreed to the unfair proposals of the British.

== Early life and educational career ==
Srinivasa Sastri was born in the town of Valangaiman, Madras Presidency, India on 22 September 1869. His father, Vaidik Sankaranarayana Sastri, was a Hindu priest. He was educated at the Native High School in Kumbakonam and in 1887, graduated from Pachaiyappa's College, Chennai, with a first class degree in English and Sanskrit. On graduation, he found employment as a teacher at Municipal College, Salem.

Srinivasa Sastri married Parvathi in 1885. His granddaughters are, Parvathy, married to Ramamurti (Retd.G.M of NLC) and Kausalya, married to the renowned Indian scientist and nephew of Sir C. V. Raman, S. Ramaseshan.

In 1894, Srinivasa Sastri was appointed headmaster of Hindu High School, Triplicane and served for a period of eight years, until 1902. During this period, he achieved fame for his proficiency in English and his good administrative skills. In his late years, he also served as Vice-Chancellor of the Annamalai University. During his tenure as Vice-Chancellor, he demonstrated his scholarship in Sanskrit and Oriental Literature. He persuaded Mahavidwan R. Raghava Iyengar, then Head of the Tamil Research Department, to translate Kalidasan's epic poem Abhignana Sakuntalam in Tamil. The poem was translated in the Sandam Metre and published in 1938. He delivered the Kamala lectures in Calcutta University which are widely cherished and remembered.

== Politics ==
Srinivasa Sastri established the Madras Teachers Guild during his term as headmaster of Triplicane High School. He was one of the pioneers of the Co-operative movement and started India's first co-operative society, the Triplicane Urban Co-operative Society (TUCS) in 1904.

Srinivasa Sastri met Indian independence activist Gopal Krishna Gokhale for the first time in 1906. He was drawn towards Gokhale's Servants of India Society and joined the organization becoming its president in 1915. He joined the Indian National Congress in 1908 and became the Secretary of the Madras District Congress Committee in 1911. As a member of the Congress, he was instrumental in bringing about a pact between the Congress and the Muslim League.

Srinivasa Sastri was nominated to the Madras Legislative Council in 1913 and to the Imperial Legislative Council of India in 1916. He opposed the Rowlatt Act which empowered the Government of India to imprison anyone without trial and delivered a well-appreciated speech in the Imperial Legislative Council denouncing the bill. In 1919, he was appointed a member of the Privy Council of the United Kingdom.

In 1922, Sastri resigned his membership of the Indian National Congress after disagreeing with its leadership on the issue of non-cooperation and established the Indian Liberal Party along with Tej Bahadur Sapru. He consequently served as a President of the Indian Liberal Federation. In 1924, he accompanied Annie Besant on a visit to England demanding Home Rule for India. He also participated in the first and second round table conferences.

== International delegations ==
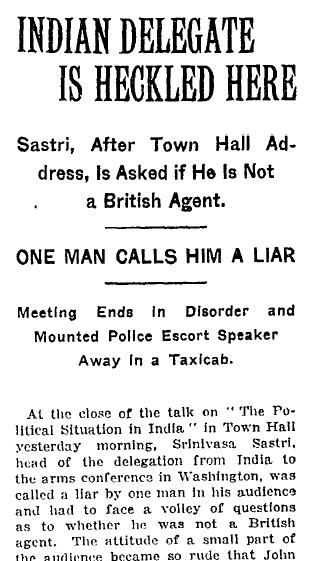
Report in The New York Times dated 29 January 1922, on the incident at the Town Hall, Washington D. C.

Srinivasa Sastri was a part of the delegation of Indian moderates who visited England in 1919. He was also a part of the Indian delegation to the Imperial Conference (1921) and the Second session of the League of Nations in 1921. As a member of the Viceregal council, Srinivasa Sastri was also a part of the British delegation which participated in the Washington Naval Conference and a signatory to the Five Power Naval Disarmament Treaty. During one of his speeches on "The Political Situation in India", he was accused of being a British agent and attacked by a mob and had to be hastily escorted away by mounted police.

In 1922, the Government of India sent Sastri on delegations to Australia, New Zealand and Canada in order to investigate the conditions of Indians living in those countries. Due to his efforts, the Government of Australia passed the Commonwealth Electoral Act enlarging the franchise to include "natives of British India".

In 1919, Srinivasa Sastri visited the Union of South Africa along with Sir Benjamin Robertson as a part of the delegation which signed the Cape Town Agreement with the Government of South Africa. As a result of this agreement, South Africa gave up its Class Area Bill intended to segregate Indians in South Africa. Initially, Jan Smuts, the Prime Minister of the Union of South Africa, refused to treat Srinivasa Sastri on par with the European delegate. However, on Srinivasa Sastri's departure from South Africa as India's Agent in 1928, Smuts recognized Sastri as the "most respected man in South Africa".

Srinivasa Sastri was sent to the Federated Malay States in 1937, to report on the conditions of the Indian labourers in the country. The delegation submitted a controversial report titled Conditions of Indian labour in Malaya which was published in Madras and Kuala Lumpur, the very same year. Srinivasa Sastri, being the author of the report, was criticized by Indian nationalists for "his reluctance to comment at length on the political and social status of Indians in Malaya".

== Agent to South Africa ==
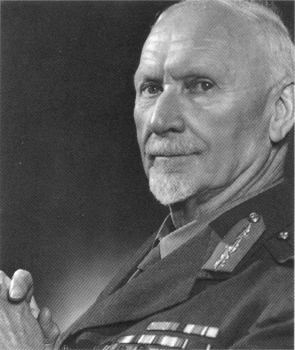
Jan Smuts, then Prime Minister of the Union of South Africa, refused to accord Srinivasa Sastri the same welcome that was offered to Sir Benjamin Robertson, a fellow delegate of Sastri.

On 27 May 1927, at the behest of Mahatma Gandhi, Lord Irwin, the Viceroy of India, appointed Srinivasa Sastri as India's first Agent to the Union of South Africa. Srinivasa Sastri arrived in South Africa in June 1927 and served as Agent till January 1929.

With Sastri's support and encouragement, dissidents of the Transvaal British Indian Association (TBIA) founded the Transvaal Indian Congress (TIC) on 18 December 1927. The TBIA later merged with the South African Indian Congress. Section 104 of the Liquor Bill prohibiting Indians from entering licensed premises was withdrawn. The Thornton Committee was established in 1928 to investigate the sanitary conditions of Indians in and around Durban.

During the early part of Sastri's tenure, a number of segregationary laws were passed targeting Indians and Indian immigrants in South Africa. The period also witnessed the establishment of a number of trade unions. Sastri campaigned against racial segregation of Indians and got the Class Area Bill segregating Indians withdrawn.

Sastri returned to India in January 1929 and was succeeded by Kurma Venkata Reddy Naidu.

== Later life and death ==
In 1930, Sastri was appointed a member of the Royal Commission on Labour in India. During 1930–31, he participated in the Round Table Conferences in London to discuss India's future and was instrumental in bringing about the Gandhi-Irwin Pact. In 1935, Sastri was appointed Vice-Chancellor of Annamalai University, in Tamil Nadu, and served from 1935 to 1940. At the peak of the Second World War, he participated in a 15-member Indian delegation which appealed to the British Prime Minister, Winston Churchill to provide dominion status to India. He strongly opposed Muslim League demands for the partition of India.

In June 1940, the Government of Madras appointed a committee headed by Srinivasa Sastri to frame a set of general principles for coining words for scientific and technical terms in vernacular languages. The constitution of the committee was strongly condemned by the Madras Presidency Tamil Sangam and its Secretary E. M. Subramania Pillai who felt that Srinivasa Sastri was biased in favour of Sanskrit and hence, Anti-Tamil. The committee submitted its report after three months recommending the retention of the existing Sanskrit loanwords in Tamil and rejecting the need for them to be replaced. The deliberations of the Sastri Committee provoked widespread agitations in Madras Presidency. The committee was eventually reshuffled by Provincial Education Minister T. S. Avinashilingam Chettiar soon after the demise of Srinivasa Sastri and balanced with the introduction of more members supporting the replacement of Sanskrit loan words.

Srinivasa Sastri's health began to deteriorate in early 1946. In January, Srinivasa Sastri was admitted to the General Hospital, Madras. He died at 10:30 p.m. on 17 April at the age of 76.

== Silver-Tongued Orator of the British Empire ==
Srinivasa Sastri was known for his mastery over the English language and his oratory. As a student, he once corrected a few passages in J. C. Nesfield's English Grammar. Whenever he was on visit to the United Kingdom, Sastri was often consulted over spellings and pronunciations. His mastery over the English language was recognized by King George V, Winston Churchill, Lady Lytton and Lord Balfour who rated him amongst the five best English-language orators of the century. The Master of Balliol, Arthur Lionel Smith swore that he had never realized the beauty of the English language until he heard Sastri. while Lord Balfour remarked that listening to Srinivasa Sastri made him realise the heights to which the English language could rise. Thomas Smart conferred upon Sastri the appellation "Silver Tongued Orator of the British Empire" and he was so called all over the United Kingdom. Srinivasa Sastri's inspirations were William Shakespeare, Sir Walter Scott, George Eliot, John Stuart Mill, Thomas Harvey, Victor Hugo and Valmiki – Indian sage and the author of the Hindu epic Ramayana.

However, others noticed that Sastri often repeated the rhetoric of the British empire. In a meeting with students in Lucknow in 1891, he advised students to follow the rules laid out by the British colonial government and not to disobey them. Some time later, when Annie Besant was interned due to her idea regarding Home rule, Sastry fell silent when followers of Besant and Servants of India needed guidance the most. This led Nehru to later comment in his autobiography that while Sastri was an excellent orator, he appeared to advocate mute submission and was not very effective in times of crisis.

== Relation with Mahatma Gandhi ==
"Your criticism soothes me. Your silence makes me feel nervous."

— Mahatma Gandhi in a letter to Sastri

During his tenure in the Servants of India Society, Sastri developed a close attachment with Mahatma Gandhi. Gandhi often addressed Srinivasa Sastri as his "elder brother" in all their correspondences. However, despite their friendship, during his tenure as president, Srinivasa Sastri opposed Gandhi's presence in the Servants of India Society. When Gandhi sought Sastri's advice before launching his non-cooperation movement, he counselled him against it. In his later years, Sastri sternly advised Mahatma Gandhi against accepting the Muslim League demand for partition.

Srinivasa Sastri corrected mistakes in the manuscript of The Story of My Experiments with Truth, the English translation of Gandhi's autobiography and also successive issues of the magazine Harijan that was edited by Mahatma Gandhi.

On Sastri's death, Gandhi paid a tribute to Sastri in a condolence message in the Harijan.

Death has removed not only from us but from the world one of India's best sons.

== Honours ==
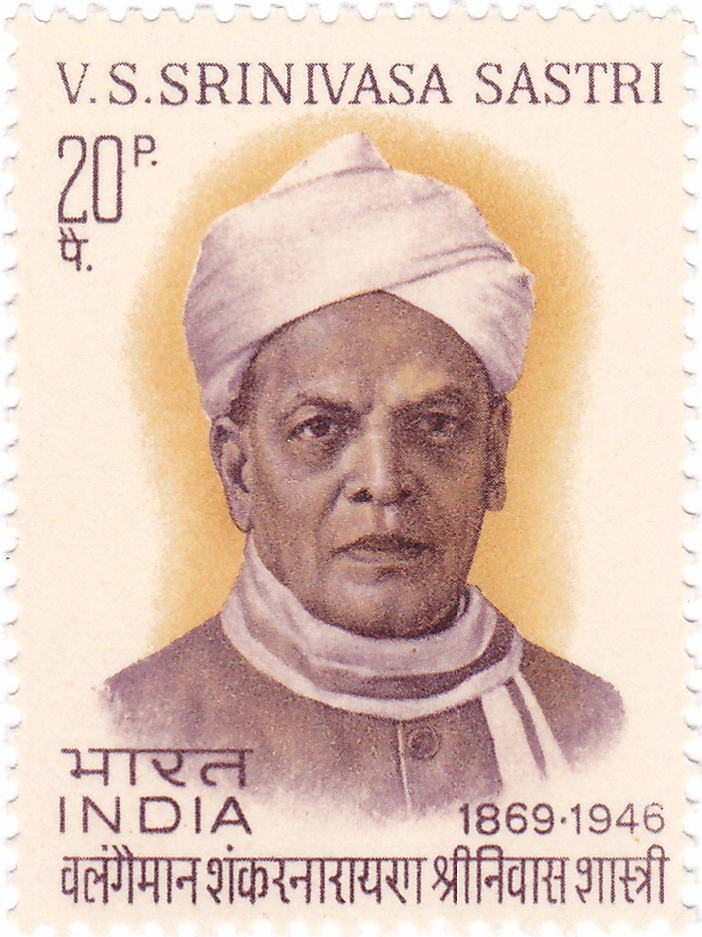
Srinivasa Sastri on a 1970 stamp of India

Sastri was made a member of the Privy Council of the United Kingdom in 1921. On 1 January 1930, he was made a Companion of Honour. The then Viceroy offered to make Sastri Knight Commander of the Order of the Star of India in 1928, but he declined the offer.

In 1937, the then Governor of Madras offered to make Sastri the Acting Chief Minister of Madras Presidency but Sastri declined the offer. He also declined an offer of membership in the council of the Secretary of State for India. In 1921, the Freedom of the City of London was conferred on Srinivasa Sastri. This was followed by the Freedom of the City of Edinburgh on 9 January 1931.

Sastri's biography, The Right Honourable V.S. Srinivasa Sastri: A Political Biography (1963), written by his long-time political secretary P. Kodanda Rao won the Watumull Memorial Prize in 1966.

== Works ==
- V. S. Srinivasa Sastri (1916). Self-government for India under the British flag. Servants of India Society.
- V. S. Srinivasa Sastri (1917). The Congress-League scheme: An Exposition. Servants of India Society.
- V. S. Srinivasa Sastri (1921). A conscience clause: for Indians in Indian education codes. Servants of India Society.
- V. S. Srinivasa Sastri (1923). The Kenya Question.
- V. S. Srinivasa Sastri (1923). Report by the Hon'ble V. S. Srinivasa Sastri regarding his deputation to the Dominions of Canada, Australia and New Zealand.
- V. S. Srinivasa Sastri (1931). The results of the Round Table Conference address at a meeting of the Committee of the Empire Parliamentary Association specially studying Indian affairs. London: Empire Parliamentary Association.
- V. S. Srinivasa Sastri; E.Lucia Turnbull; H. G. D. Turnbull (1934). Gopal Krishna Gokhale: A Brief Biography. V. Sundra Iyer.
- V. S. Srinivasa Sastri (1935). The rights and duties of the Indian citizen – The Kamala lectures. University of Calcutta.
- V. S. Srinivasa Sastri (1935). Valmiki Ramayana: condensed in the poet's own words. G. A. Natesan.
- V. S. Srinivasa Sastri (1937). Report on the conditions of Indian labour in Malaya. Government of India.
- V. S. Srinivasa Sastri (1937). Life of Gopala Krishna Gokhale. Bangalore Print and Pub. Co.
- V. S. Srinivasa Sastri (1939). Birthright. Kumbakonam Parliament.
- V. S. Srinivasa Sastri (1941). என் வாழ்க்கையின் அம்சங்கள் (in Tamil).
- V. S. Srinivasa Sastri (1945). Life and times of Sir Pherozeshah Mehta. Madras Law Journal Press.
- V. S. Srinivasa Sastri (1946). My master Gokhale. Model Publications.

== Other biographies ==
- T. N. Jagadisan (1969). Builders of modern India: V. S. Srinivasa Sastri. Government of India.
- Pandurangi Kodanda Rao (1963). The Right Honourable V. S. Srinivasa Sastri, P.C., C.H., LL. D., D. LITT.: a political biography. Asia Publishing House.
- The Rt. Hon. V. S. Srinivasa Sastri (1869–1946) centenary souvenir (22-9-1969). Servants of India Society. 1969.
- S. Muthiah (26 January 2009). "Sastri of South Africa". The Hindu. Archived from the original on 7 November 2012.
- S. R. Bakshi (1993). V. S. Srinivasa Sastri: Volume 40 of Indian freedom fighters: struggle for independence. Anmol Publishers Pvt Ltd. ISBN 978-81-7041-604-3.

Preceded by Gopal Krishna Gokhale	President of the Servants of India Society; 1915–1927	Succeeded by H. N. Kunzru
Preceded by None	Agent to the Republic of South Africa; 1927–1929	Succeeded by Kurma Venkata Reddy Naidu
