= Aman Singh Bundela =

Raja of Sarila (1755 to 1788)

Aman Singh
- Raja

Raja of Sarila
- Reign: c. 1755 – c. 1888
- Predecessor: Title established
- Successor: Tej Singh
- House: Sarila
- Dynasty: Bundela
- Father: Pahar Singh

Aman Singh (or Man Singh) was the Raja of Sarila from 1755 to 1788.

== Biography ==
Aman Singh was the son of Pahar Singh and the grandson of Chhatrasal. His father sent him to occupy and fortify Sarila. Aman Singh, following his father’s wishes, conquered the area and constructed a fortress there between 1755 and 1770. The descendants of the warriors who aided him were granted jagirs, and these jagirs paid no tribute to the state. He was succeeded by Tej Singh.
