= Tej Bahadur Sapru =

Indian lawyer and politician (1875–1949)

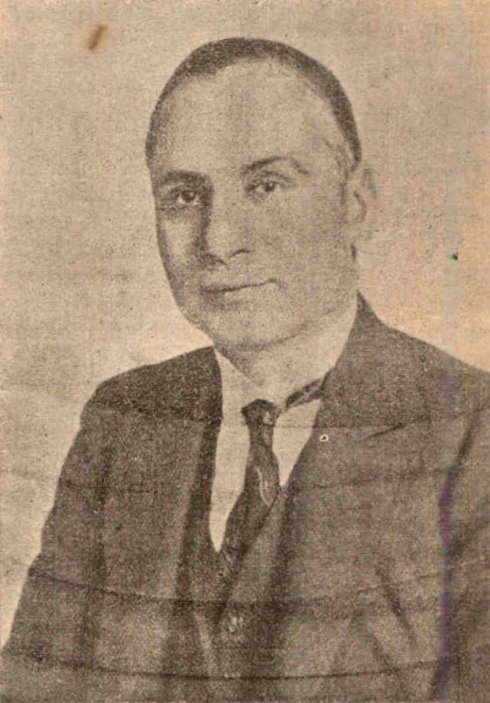
- Born: 8 December 1875; Aligarh, North-Western Provinces, British India
- Died: 20 January 1949 (aged 73); Allahabad, United Provinces, India
- Education: Agra University

Tej Bahadur Sapru (8 December 1875 – 20 January 1949) was an Indian freedom fighter, lawyer, and politician. He was a key figure in India's struggle for independence, helping draft the Indian Constitution. He was the leader of the Liberal party in British-ruled India.

== Early life and career ==
Sapru was born on 8 December 1875 in Aligarh in the North-Western Provinces of British India (now in Uttar Pradesh, India) into a Kashmiri Pandit family. Sapru was the only son of Ambika Prasad Sapru, a zemindar, and his wife Gaura Sapru (née Hukku). Sapru's mother Gaura was the sister of Niranjan Hukku, whose daughter Uma was married to Shyamlal Nehru, a first cousin of Jawaharlal Nehru. Sapru was also an eighth cousin of Muhammad Iqbal, a Muslim ideologue who was among those who formulated the very idea of Pakistan in the 1930s, who was later given the title of the national poet of Pakistan.

He was educated at the Agra College. Sapru worked in the Allahabad High Court as a lawyer where Purushottam Das Tandon, a future nationalist leader, worked as his junior. He later served as a dean of the Banaras Hindu University. On 13 December 1930, Sapru was admitted to the Middle Temple, but withdrew on 14 January 1932 without being called to the English bar.

== Political career ==
Sapru served in the Legislative Council of the United Provinces (1913–16) and the Imperial Legislative Council (1916–20) and as a member for law affairs in the Viceroy's Council (1920–23). Sapru and Indian Liberals collaborated with the Congress after the ascent of Mahatma Gandhi, who advocated non-violent civil disobedience against British rule. Sapru supported the Non-cooperation movement until (1920–22). He was knighted as a Knight Commander of the Order of the Star of India (KCSI) in the 1923 King's Birthday Honours list, As early as 1927, Sapru organised an All Party Conference to begin drafting the Indian Constitution. In 1928, he helped draft the Nehru Committee Report on Constitutional Reforms. It is acknowledged as the most important document related to the evolution of the Indian Constitution. For the first time in the history of India, it proposed uniting the princely states with the rest of India as a part of the federal polity.

Although initially a member of the Indian National Congress, India's largest political party, Sapru left it to join the Liberal Party of India. He was also a member of the Hindu Mahasabha, sitting on its All-India Committee. While he supported Swaraj (Self Rule) and civil disobedience against British colonial rule, as a constitutionalist, Sapru advocated for greater political rights and freedoms for Indians to be achieved through dialogue with British authorities. For example, on 28 February 1930, he attended a dinner party organised by the Standing Committee of British India and minister advisers. Chimanlal Setalvad from Bombay was also present ready to co-operate with Muslims M. A. Jinnah, and M. R. Jayakar, alongside C. P. Ramaswami Aiyer from Madras. The Committee absorbed Haksar's Report, and agreed to hold monthly meetings; their deliberations became known as the Sapru Committee recommendations. These "conversations with the princes are very important" declared New Delhi. Kailas Nath Haksar was a personal friend who also proposed federation of British and princely India, responsibility was a conservative counter-weight to radicalisation. They established good relations with the British Ministry of Works and Gandhi to build a forum for the round table conference. On 17 November 1930 the All-India Federation gained princely support for a constitutional relationship. Although unaware of the impact of this shift, Sapru sought out Gandhi and Nehru for conversations against civil disobedience movements. He was not successful, other than drawing criticism from Nehru about British control over the Army and financial safeguards. However they had more success in Bhopal and Bikaner, proposed the establishment of a Centre Party with allies in Oudh and United Provinces. They were in no stronger position when the Second Round Table Conference started. The factional splits were fatal to the princes cause; and Sapru's severe criticisms of Maharaja of Dhollpur only served to postpone federation. But he persevered with colleagues Jayakar and Haksar to lobby officials, when he was informed the Viceroy warned against repudiation. Lord Willingdon remained aloof and indifferent to his efforts. The bureaucratic denials slowed attempts, and so in early 1932 Lord Lothian of the Franchise Committee made overtures towards Federation, they recruited Hailey's organ The Pioneer to persuade the princes to donate.

Sapru and other Liberal politicians, eager to achieve independence through dialogue, participated in the central and provincial legislatures set up by the British, even though they were opposed by most Indian political parties and ignored by the people, who considered the legislatures to be unrepresentative "rubber stamps" for the Viceroy of India. Many Congress politicians respected Sapru as an eminent jurist, as he was a valuable and effective mediator. Sapru mediated between Gandhi and the Viceroy Lord Irwin, helping to forge the Gandhi–Irwin Pact that ended the Salt Satyagraha. Sapru also mediated between Gandhi, B. R. Ambedkar and the British over the issue of separate electorates for India's "Untouchables", which was settled by the Poona Pact. Sapru was chosen as the representative of Indian Liberals at the Round Table Conferences (1931–33), which sought to deliberate plans over granting more autonomy to Indians. His efforts along with those of his contemporary M. R. Jayakar at the Round Table Conferences for bridging the differences between the British administration and Congress are well known. But by Third Round Table many princes would not turn up, and their ministers were lukewarm about federation, and personalities clashed to exclude his able lieutenant Haksar. Sapru had to battle conservative intransigent and princely fickleness when participation was largely voluntary. He was appointed a member of the Privy Council on 26 February 1934.

Sapru supported the Viceroy's decision to bring India into the Second World War in 1939, even as the Congress criticised the decision as unilateral and made without consulting the representatives of India's people. Sapru was also one of the main lawyers engaged to defend captured soldiers of the rebel Indian National Army, raised by nationalist leader Subhas Chandra Bose with the aid of Imperial Japan during the warand the Quit India Movement (1942–46).

=== Sapru Committee Report ===
In 1944, the Standing Committee of the Non-Party Conference adopted a resolution to appoint a committee that would make recommendations on constitutional principles, taking into particular account issues of communal division in India. Sapru was invited to head the committee, and to appoint members representing various communities to participate in the preparation of its report. This report, titled 'Constitutional Proposals of the Sapru Committee', came to be commonly known as the Sapru Committee Report, and contained 21 recommendations pertaining to constitutional questions that concerned the governance and politics of India. The Report was published along with a detailed exposition of the reasoning behind these recommendations and included a number of notes of dissent from committee members, as well as details of correspondence regarding their deliberations between the committee and political figures such as Ambedkar, Gandhi, and others. The Sapru Committee Report rejected the proposal for the division of the Indian sub-continent into the two states of India and Pakistan, and made a number of recommendations for the protection of minorities in a unified state. While the Report did not receive much attention or consideration when it was published, it was cited and considered a number of times by the Constituent Assembly of India when drafting the Constitution of India.

== Personal life ==
Sapru and his wife were the parents of five children. Their three sons were Prakash Narain Sapru, Trijugi Narain Sapru, and Anand Narain Sapru and their daughters were named Jagdambashwari and Bhuvaneshwari. Sapru was the grandfather of Jagdish Narain Sapru, former chairman of British Oxygen and of ITC Limited.

Sir Tej Bahadur Sapru died on 20 January 1949 in Allahabad, seventeen months after India gained independence.
