= S. B. Tambe =

Indian politician

Shripad Balwant Tambe was a pledger from Amravati in Berar division of Central Provinces. He was a member of the Swaraj Party and President of the Central Provinces Legislative Council.

He was appointed member of the Government of Central Provinces after Moropant Vishvanath Joshi's tenure ended in 1925. His appointment created political interest throughout India and the Swaraj Party. He was opposed by Motilal Nehru and others, but Mr. M R Jayakar from Bombay Legislative Council supported the move citing similarity with V J Patel.

As of 1927 he inaugurated "The Poona Sevasadan Society, Nagpur Branch" on 2 January, when he was a member of Government of Central Provinces and Berar.

In 1931, Tambe attended the 2nd Round Table Conference.
