= Sarila (state) =

Princely State in India

State of Sarila
- Princely State of British India
- 1755–1947
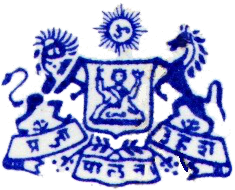
- Coat of arms
- Capital: Sarila
- Area
  - 1881: 90.6496 km^{2} (35.0000 sq mi)
- Population
  - 1881: 5,014
  - 1891: 5,622
  - 1901: 6,298
- History
  - Established: 1755
  - Accession to the Union of India: 1947
| Succeeded by |
| India |

The State of Sarila was a non-salute princely state under the Bundelkhand Agency. Currently, Sarila town, the state's capital, is part of Uttar Pradesh.

Following partition of India in 1947, Mahipal Singh Ju Deo, the last ruler of the state, signed the Instrument of Accession, whereby he acceded his state to the Union of India.

== History ==
Sarila State was founded by Aman Singh. Aman was the son of Pahar Singh and the grandson of Chhatrasal. Pahar Singh sent Aman to occupy Sarila where Aman built a fortress between 1755 and 1760.

The state became a British protectorate in 1807. Following the independence of India, Sarila was merged on 4 April 1948 with 34 other states to form Vindhya Pradesh.

== List of rulers ==
The rulers are Rajputs of the Bundela family. They held the title of Raja. Below is the list of rulers and titular rulers:

=== Rulers ===
| Name | Reign began | Reign ended | Notes |
|---|---|---|---|
| Aman Singh | 1755 | 1788 | Founded the state |
| Tej Singh | 1788 | 1818 | |
| Anirudh Singh | 1818 | 1842 | |
| Hindupat Singh | 1842 | 1871 | |
| Khallak Singh | 1871 | 1882 | |
| Pahar Singh | 19 August 1882 | 1898 | |
| Mahipal Singh Ju Deo | 11 September 1898 | 1970 | |

=== Titular ===
| Name | Reign began | Reign ended | Notes |
|---|---|---|---|
| Mahipal Singh Ju Deo | 1970 | January 1983 | |
| Narendra Singh Ju Deo | January 1983 | 7 July 2011 | |

== Sources and further reading ==
- Princely States of India K-Z
