= List of fasts undertaken by Mahatma Gandhi =

Mohandas Karamchand Gandhi, popularly known as Mahatma Gandhi, informally The Father of the Nation in India, undertook 18 fasts during India's freedom movement. His longest fasts lasted 21 days. Fasting was a tool used by Gandhi as part of his philosophy of Ahimsa (non-violence) as well as satyagraha.

== Fasts ==
Number	Date	Duration	Place	Reason and demands	Reaction to fast	Result
1	1913 (13–20 July)	7 days	Phoenix, South Africa	First penitential fast		
2	1914 (February)	1 day	Phoenix, South Africa	A Phoenix teacher had violated Ashram rules by eating pakodas with some students but denied it. Gandhi began an indefinite fast of atonement.	She confessed a day later.	Gandhi ended the fast.
3	1914 (2 May – 16 May)	14 days	Phoenix, South Africa	Second penitential fast		
4	1918 (15–18 March)	3 days	Ahmedabad	Striking mill workers in Ahmedabad were dejected and losing hope of getting their needed raise. Gandhi announced an indefinite fast until it was resolved.	Mill workers agreed to stay on strike.	Mill workers and owners agreed to arbitration; the workers got their raise.
5	1919 (14-17 Apr)	72 hours	Ahmedabad	First anti-violence fast: against the attempted derail of a train at Nadiad.		
6	1921 (19-22 Nov)	3 days	Bombay	Second anti-violence fast: indefinite fast until peace was made in Bombay, after violence broke out on the occasion of the Prince of Wales' arrival	Community leaders went around the city to "restore and preserve peace."	After a peaceful night, broke his fast with "a frugal fruit repast."
7	1922 (12-17 Feb)	5 days	Bardoli	Third anti-violence fast: for atonement for violence done in Chauri Chaura incident.		
8	1924 (18 Sep – 8 Oct)	21 days	Delhi	First Hindu-Muslim unity fast	Interest of Hindu-Muslim unity after the first non-cooperation movement	Ended fast while listening to the Quran and Gita being read.
9	1925 (24 Nov – 1 Dec)	7 days		Third penitential fast.		
10	1932 (20-26 Sep)	149 hours	Poona	First anti-untouchability fast: against clauses of the Communal Award creating separate electorates and separate reservation of seats for Depressed Classes. The anti-untouchability activist B. R. Ambedkar had advocated for these clauses, but Gandhi prioritized unity among Hindus over political representation for the Depressed Classes. (He did not oppose separate electorates for Muslims, Sikhs, or Christians.)	Fast undertaken at Yerwada Central Jail. National leaders assembled in Pune, where Ambedkar reluctantly negotiated with Gandhi, resulting in the Poona Pact.	As a result of the Poona Pact, the British Government withdrew the clauses in the Communal Award against which Gandhi was protesting. The Depressed Classes would get reserved seats, but they would be elected by joint electorates. Reactions to the Poona Pact among the Depressed Classes were mixed, and its legacy is still debated.
11	1932 (3-4 Dec)	1 day		Second anti-untouchability fast: sympathetic to Appasaheb Patwardhan		
12	1933 (8 May – 29 May)	21 days		Third anti-untouchability fast: for the improvement of Harijans' condition	Released unconditionally from prison on 8 May 1933, and observed the fast at Lady Thackersey's home in Poona.	
13	1933 (16-23 Aug)	7 days		Fourth anti-untouchability fast: to obtain privileges (while in prison) that would enable him to carry on his fight in behalf of the Harijans	Released unconditionally from prison on 23 August 1933, for health reasons	
14	1934 (7-14 Aug)	7 days		Fourth anti-violence fast: against a violent young Congressman		
15	1939 (3-7 March)	99 hours	Rajkot	Establishment of a political reform committee and release of satyagraha prisoners.	The British Viceroy brokered a deal to end the fast.	Gandhi's wife was freed, but the committee was never formed.
16	1943 (10 Feb – 3 Mar)	21 days	Delhi	Objecting to six months of detention without charges by the British.		The British ignored him; nothing changed.
17	1947 (1-4 Sep)	73 hours	Calcutta	Second Hindu-Muslim unity fast		
18	1948 (13-18 Jan)	123 hours		Third Hindu-Muslim unity fast for restoration of communal peace. Gandhi was reading the dreadful news of the Kashmir war, while at the same time fasting to death because Muslims could not live safely in Delhi. Meeting Maulana Azad, Gandhi laid down seven conditions for breaking his fast. These were: The annual fair (the Urs) at the Khwaja Bakhtiyar shrine at Mehrauli, due in nine days time, should take place peacefully; The hundred odd mosques in Delhi converted into homes and temples should be restored to their original uses; Muslims should be allowed to move freely around Old Delhi; Non-Muslims should not object to Delhi Muslims returning to their homes from Pakistan; Muslims should be allowed to travel without danger in trains; There should be no economic boycott of Muslims; Accommodation of Hindu refugees in Muslim areas should be done with the consent of those Muslims already in these localities.	Politicians and leaders of communal bodies had to agree for a joint plan for restoration of normal life. Nathuram Godse assassinated Gandhi.	A large number of important politicians and leaders of communal bodies agreed to a joint plan for restoration of normal life in the city
