= A. P. Patro =

Indian politician

Sir Annepu Parasuramdas Patro KCIE
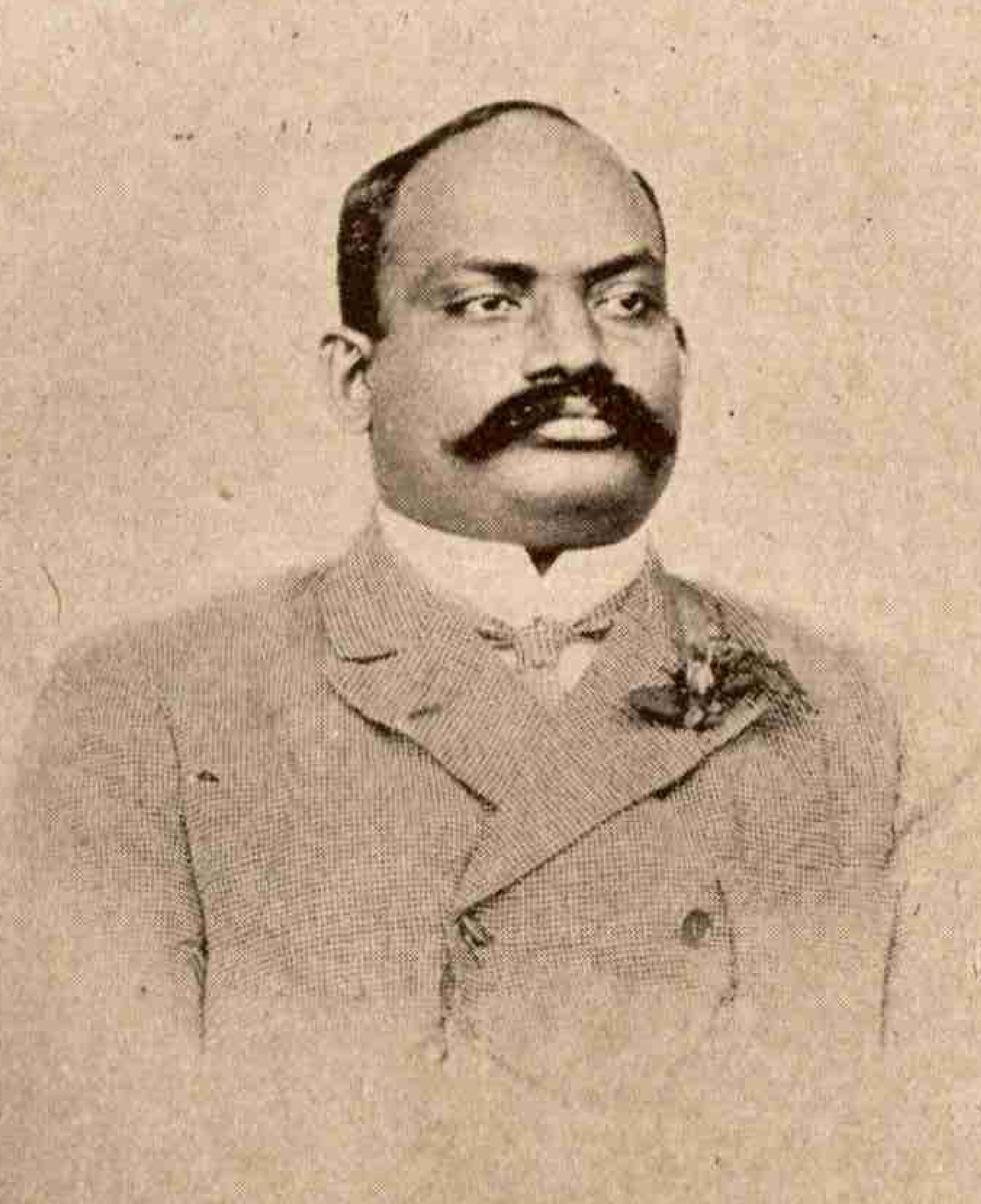
- A portrait of A. P. Patro

Speaker of the Odisha Legislative Assembly
- In office 1946–1946

Minister of Public Works and Education (Madras Presidency)
- In office 11 July 1921 – 3 December 1926
- Premier: Raja of Panagal
- Governor: Freeman Freeman-Thomas, 1st Marquess of Willingdon Sir Charles George Todhunter (acting), George Goschen, 2nd Viscount Goschen
- Preceded by: A. Subbarayalu Reddiar
- Succeeded by: A. Ranganatha Mudaliar

Personal details
- Born: 1875 or 1876 Berhampur, Ganjam district, Madras Presidency
- Died: 1946 (age 69/70 or 70/71)
- Party: Indian National Congress, Justice Party
- Education: Madras Christian College
- Occupation: legislator, political activist
- Profession: lawyer

Rao Bahadur Sir Annepu Parasuramdas Patro KCIE (1875 or 1876–1946) from Berhampur was an Indian politician, zamindar and education minister in the erstwhile Madras Presidency. As a member of the Justice Party, he participated in the First Round Table Conference.

Patro was born in a rich and powerful family of Berhampur, Madras Presidency. He did his schooling in Berhampur and graduated in law from Madras Christian College. Patro actively participated in the Odia Movement and was a member of the Indian National Congress and later, the Justice Party. In 1920, he was elected to the Madras Legislative Council and served as the Minister of Public Works and Education from 1921 to 1926. In 1937, Patro was elected to the Odisha Legislative Council. He served as Speaker of the Assembly for a short time until his death in 1946.

It was during Patro's tenure that the Andhra University was established. Patro was also responsible for creating the existing administrative system of Madras University.

== Early life ==
Patro was born in Berhampur in Ganjam district, Madras Presidency. It is a matter of dispute whether he was born in 1875 or 1876. His father Narayan Patro was an affluent zamindar in Ganjam district. He belongs to Kalingi community which has dominant vote strength in that constituency. He had his schooling in Berhampur and graduated in law from the Madras Christian College. On graduation, Patro practised as an advocate during which his most important clients were the rajas and zamindars of Orissa. Patro gradually rose to become a district-level court pleader.

== Odia movement ==
In the early years of the 20th century, Patro got involved in the Odia movement which demanded a separate Odisha province comprising all Odia-speaking districts of Madras, Bengal and Central Provinces. In 1902-03, he spearheaded agitations in Ganjam district. This marked the beginning of his involvement in politics.

On 11 and 12 April 1902, an Utkal Union Conference was held at Berhampur presided over by the first college graduate from Berhampur. Patro was one of the important delegates representing Ganjam district at the Conference.

During the First Round Table Conference held in London on 12 November 1930, the Raja of Paralakhemundi supported by the Utkal Provincial Congress Committee and the Indian National Congress, appealed to the Chairman of the Committee for a separate province on behalf of the Odia people. Patro, then a member of the Madras Legislative Council, supported his proposal and expressed his solidarity with the movement.

== In the Indian National Congress ==
Patro joined the Indian National Congress in the early years of the second decade of the 20th century and in 1915, was the sole non-Brahmin in the All India Congress Committee. In 1917, Patro resigned from the Indian National Congress to found the South Indian Liberal Federation.

== Minister of public works and education ==
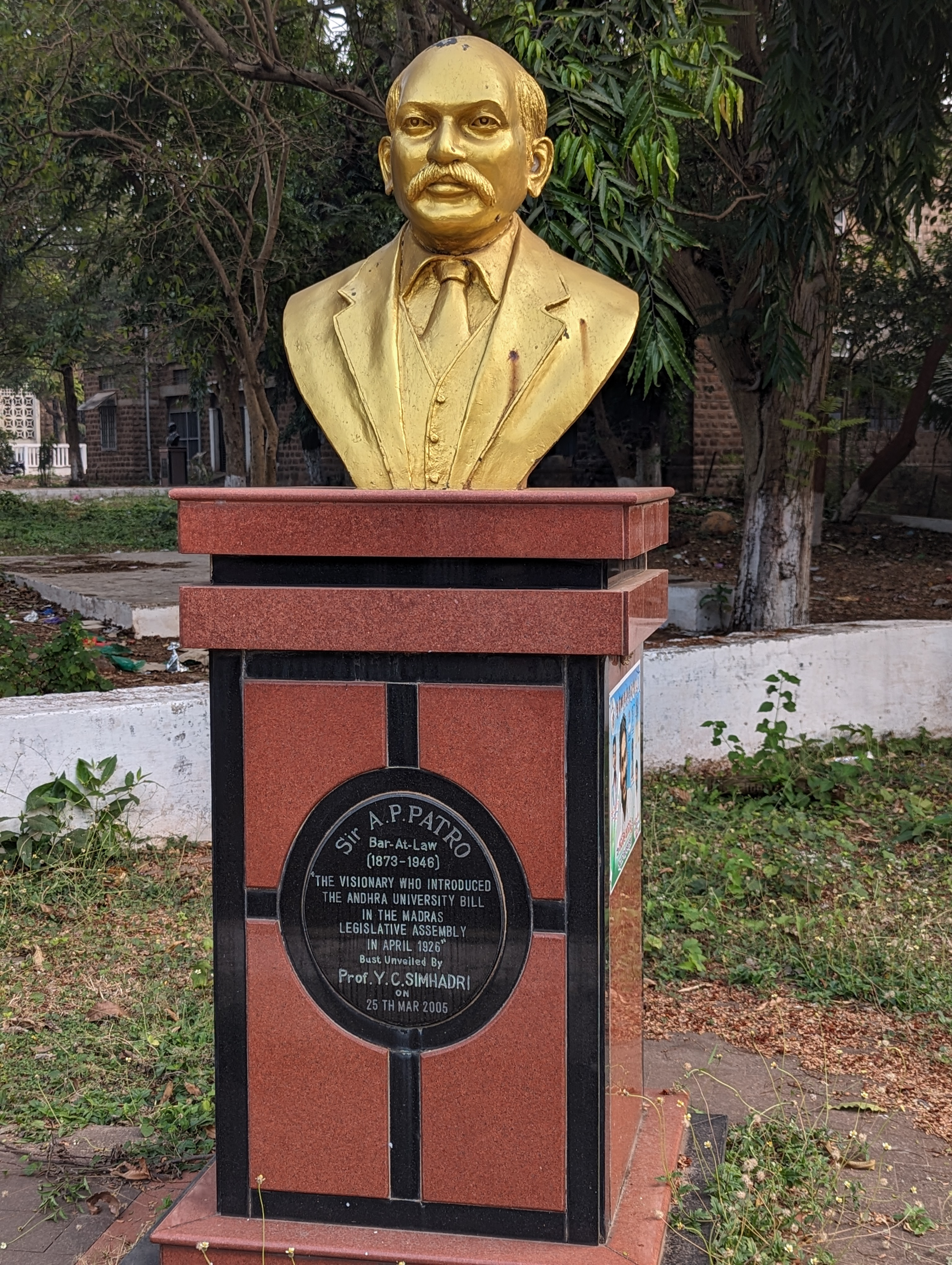
A.P.Patro Statue

Patro was one of the founder-members of the Justice Party. He contested in the first general elections in the Presidency held in November 1920 and was elected to the Madras Legislative Council. On 11 July 1921, when A. Subbarayalu Reddiar, the Chief Minister of Madras Presidency who held the portfolios of education and public works resigned citing health reasons, Patro was appointed in his stead, as the Minister of Education and Public Works.

Patro served as the Minister of Education from 11 July 1921 to 3 December 1926. During his tenure as Education minister, Patro introduced the Madras University Act in 1923 which democratised the management of the University of Madras. The bill asserted that the governing body would henceforth be headed by a Chancellor who would be assisted by a pro-Chancellor who was usually the Minister of Education. Apart from the Chancellor and the pro-Chancellor who were elected, there was to be a Vice-Chancellor appointed by the Chancellor.

The Andhra University Act of 1925 established the Andhra University on the same pattern as the Madras University. As a mark of respect a statue was instituted in Andhra University Premises. (see the image)

In August 1921, the First communal Government Order (G.O. No.613[31]), introducing reservations in the Madras Presidency, was passed. This G.O. had its impact mainly in the field of education. In 1923, the government passed a second order decreeing that endowments to universities would be cut if they did not permit the admission of scheduled castes. The admission procedure in the universities were also heavily altered removing the necessity of a knowledge of Sanskrit for admission to medical colleges.

Patro patronised and promoted Telugu during his tenure as the Minister of Public Works and Education. On 12 October 1925, Patro inaugurated the Loyola College in Chennai.

== Later political activism ==
Patro was an active leader in the Justice Party even after the end of his ministry. In the late 1920s, when two separate factions the Ministerialists and Constitutionalists evolved in the Justice Party, Patro supported the policies and objectives of the Ministerialists. In 1929, a resolution was passed by the Ministerialists recommending the removal of restrictions on Brahmins joining the organisation. The Executive Committee of the party drafted a resolution to this effect and placed it before the Eleventh Confederation of the party at Nellore, for approval. This was followed by an eloquent speech by the President, P. Munuswamy Naidu. Patro supported the resolution and introduced the following amendment to it:

That every person, who is willing to subscribe to the creed and aims and objects of the South Indian Liberal Federation and is willing to abide by the rules framed by the Executive Committee, is eligible to become a member of the Federation

The motion was however defeated by the orthodox sections of the Justice Party. In 1928, Patro led the Madras Legislative Council committee that welcomed the Simon Commission and submitted a memorandum seeking dominion status for India and more autonomy for the provinces.

In the early 1930s, as the movement for a separate province of Odisha gained momentum, Patro actively supported the movement and worked for the unification of the Oriya speaking northern districts of the Presidency with the new province.

In 1935, Patro resigned his membership of the Madras Legislative Council when the Ganjam district and parts of Vizagapatam district were officially transferred to Odisha.

== In the Odisha Assembly ==
Patro was elected to the Odisha Legislative Council in 1937. He opposed the Quit India Movement and offered his full support to the British war-effort during the Second World War. He was re-elected to the assembly in 1946 and served as speaker of the Assembly. Patro died in 1946. He was approximately 70 years old at that time.

== Religion ==
Little is known about Patro's religious affiliations. Patro built a Brahmo mandir in the Andhra region and organised theological discourses in the temple premises.

== Honors ==
Patro received the title of Rao Bahadur, was knighted in the 1924 New Year Honours list and was appointed a Knight Commander of the Indian Empire (KCIE) in the 1935 Silver Jubilee and Birthday Honours list.

== Publications ==
- Patro, A. P. (1912). Studies in Local Self-Government, Education and Sanitation. Madras: G. A. Natesan & Co.
- The Justice Movement in India. Asiatic Review, 27(93). 1932.
