= T. N. Jagadisan =

Indian social worker (1909–1991)

- Born: 2 October 1909; Tachchakkadu, Madras Presidency (now Tamil Nadu)
- Died: 28 June 1991 (aged 81)
- Education: B.A. (Hons.), English, University of Madras
- Occupations: Social worker, educator
- Known for: Advocacy for leprosy care and rehabilitation
- Notable work: Fulfillment Through Leprosy (autobiography)
- Awards: Padma Shri; 1957

T. N. Jagadisan (2 October 1909 – 28 June 1991) was an Indian social worker, educator, and advocate for leprosy care and rehabilitation.

== Early life ==
Jagadisan was born on 2 October 1909 in Tachchakkadu, a village near Chidambaram in Madras Presidency (now Tamil Nadu). He completed his B.A. (Hons.) in English from the University of Madras. He then began his career as a teacher at institutions such as Madura College (Madurai), Union Christian College (Aluva), and Annamalai University (Chidambaram). At Annamalai University, Jagadisan was mentored by V. S. Srinivasa Sastri, whose guidance inspired his commitment to public service. Diagnosed with non-infective leprosy in his youth, he experienced firsthand the stigma associated with the disease. This personal struggle motivated him to dedicate his life to improving the lives of leprosy patients.

== Leprosy care ==
=== National contributions ===
In 1943, Jagadisan joined the British Empire Leprosy Relief Association, which later transformed into the Hind Kusht Nivaran Sangh after India's independence. He was a founding member of HKNS and served as its Organizing Secretary from 1950 to 1966. He worked to promote scientific leprosy treatments and reduce societal discrimination against patients.

In 1946, he established the Kasturba Kushta Nivaran Nilayam in Malavanthangal, one of India’s high-prevalence leprosy regions. The center provided medical care, rehabilitation, and vocational training, aiming to reintegrate patients into society. Jagadisan worked with national leaders like Mahatma Gandhi and Thakkar Bapa, who supported leprosy care as a part of India’s broader social and developmental goals. In 1949, the Government appointed Jagadisan as the Honorary Leprosy Prevention and Relief Organizer in the Rural Welfare Department.

=== International contributions ===
Jagadisan’s efforts extended across India, where he promoted leprosy control programs and trained workers. He also represented India at global platforms:

- 1958: Chaired a session on social aspects and rehabilitation at the VII International Congress of Leprology in Tokyo.
- 1963: Chaired a similar session at the VIII International Congress of Leprology in Rio de Janeiro.
- 1965: Chaired the Leprosy Section at the Pan Pacific Conference of the Royal Society for Rehabilitation of the Disabled in Japan.

Jagadisan’s international engagements, including visits to France, Germany, Belgium, and Switzerland, fostered collaborations that enhanced India’s leprosy programs and raised global awareness.

== Publications ==
- Leprosy and the Social Worker (1952)
- Mahatma Gandhi Answers the Challenge of Leprosy (1965)
- Builders of modern India: V. S. Srinivasa Sastri (1969)

== Recognition ==
Jagadisan emphasised treating leprosy as a medical condition, advocating for policies that balanced scientific treatment with human compassion. His initiatives significantly reduced leprosy prevalence in regions like South Arcot District. He received several honors for his work:

- Padma Shri (1957)
- Silver Medal from Pope Paul VI (1967)
- International Gandhi Award (1988)

== Legacy ==
Jagadisan died on 28 June 1991. His autobiography, Fulfillment Through Leprosy, chronicles his life and contributions, serving as a lasting testament to his work in leprosy care and advocacy.
