= Tej Singh Judeo =

Raja of Sarila (1788-1818)

- Raja

Raja of Sarila
- Reign: 1788 – 1818
- Predecessor: Aman Singh
- Successor: Anirudh Singh
- Issue: Anirudh Singh
- House: Sarila
- Dynasty: Bundela

Tej Singh Ju Deo was Raja of Sarila from 1788 to 1818.

== Biography ==
He succeeded Aman Singh as the Raja of Sarila. He was dispossessed of all his possessions by Ali Bahadur of Banda. However, with the help of Raja Himmat Bahadur, he managed to retain a portion of his territories. At the time of the British arrival in Bundelkhand, he possessed only a fortress and a village in Jalalpur, which yielded an annual revenue of 9,000 rupees. The British government granted him a pension of 1,000 rupees per month until a suitable provision could be made for him. He had put forward before the British government a claim over eleven villages that yielded revenue of 23,600 rupees, which they confirmed upon him in 1807 through a sanad. The pension he was receiving for his maintenance was then stopped. He was succeeded by his son Anirudh Singh.
