= K. T. Paul =

Indian religious leader (1876–1931)

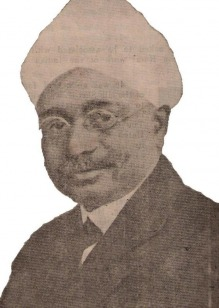
- Born: Kanagarayan Thiruselvam Paul; 24 March 1876; Salem, Tamil Nadu, British India
- Died: 11 April 1931 (aged 55)
- Occupation: General Secretary

Kanakarayan Tiruselvam Paul (24 March 1876 – 11 April 1931) was an Indian leader who served as the president of the All India Conference of Indian Christians, representing the Christian community of colonial India in the First Round Table Conference in London. Paul was the first Indian-born National General Secretary of the National Council of YMCAs of India. A Christian himself, he explored the relationship between Christianity and national identity. He was the President of the Governing Council of the United Theological College, Bangalore, General Secretary of the National Missionary Society (India), and Chairman of the National Christian Council of India. Paul's legacy was rural reconstruction, which he initiated through the YMCA in India. He was a follower of Mahatma Gandhi, who praised K.T. Paul for his nationalism.

== Early life ==
Kanakarayan Tiruselvam Paul was born on 24 March 1876 in a Christian family in Salem, Madras Presidency, India. After matriculation and intermediate studies, he joined Madras Christian College in 1892 to earn his bachelor's degree.

He worked in the Government secretariat and resigned after his marriage. He joined the Coimbatore London Mission High School as a teacher and later became the Headmaster of the Punganur Arcot Mission High School.

In 1902, he joined the Teacher's College at Saidapet. The following year, he returned to his alma mater, Madras Christian College, as a tutor in the Department of History.

== Christian leader ==
Paul's contributions to the church in India may be seen in his work at the National Missionary Society (NMS). In 1905, he helped Vedanayagam Samuel Azariah to establish the National Missionary Society at Serampore and became its Honorary Treasurer; the following year, he became its Organising Secretary and, from 1909 to 1914, general secretary. In this capacity, he became aware of the need for unity in Christian witness and social activity. As general secretary, he visited churches, conducted personal interviews, and organized branch meetings all over India. In North India, he initiated a civic body called 'Premsabha' (meaning 'Council of Love' in Hindi), which did social and religious work among poor Christians of the depressed classes. His contacts with Christian missionaries of other denominations also led Paul to think about the need for unity among Christians and to take part in the formation of the South Indian United Church.

Paul worked for the transformation of the National Missionary Council of India into the National Christian Council of India, in which the Indian churches, as well as missions from overseas, were members. He became the first Chairman of the National Christian Council of India. Paul also showed much interest in theological education. At the time of his death, he was the President of the Governing Council of the United Theological College, Bangalore. He was also the convener of the SIUC committee on theological education. Paul became the president of the All India Conference of Indian Christians in 1923 and represented the Indian Christian community at the London Round Table Conferences in 1930–1932, along with Surendra Kumar Datta.

== Indian Nationalism and Christian Leaders ==
The massacre of innocent Indians by General Dyer at the Jallianwala Bagh in Amritsar, Punjab, in 1918 had fanned the fire of anti-British feelings all over India. Mahatma Gandhi, launching his first attack on British rule using the weapon of Satyagraha, gave a call for the Non-Cooperation Movement in 1920. Indian Christians could not sit on the fence and had to reveal where their sympathies lay. The leaders S. K. Datta and K. T. Paul published an article in the 'Young Men of India' in July 1920, protesting against the insensitive behavior of the British in Punjab. Though the massacre of Jallianwala Bagh had shocked Indian Christians, Paul had not lost his belief that India could build its future through organic links with Western Christianity and British contact. However, his hopes of transforming the Indian polity in cooperation with the British rule strengthened by the diarchy turned into dismay in 1918.

The history of India since the second half of the 19th century had been distinguished by a national movement for political independence. In its initial stages, Indian Christians had seldom participated, and during the first Non-cooperation Movement of Gandhi (1920–23), there was hardly any Christian participation. But in the latter phases of the struggle, an increasing number of Christians began to identify with the national movement, and the maintenance of a secular state – especially from among the Reformed Churches: H.C. Mukherjee, Raja Sir Maharaj Singh, K.T. Paul, S.K. Datta, and V.S. Azariah and V.Santiago are examples. Between 1900 and 1930 K.T. Paul, S.K. Datta, V.Santiago, and V.S. Azariah formed a trio who instilled feelings of responsible nationalism in the Christian community – despite opposition from some western missionaries as well as some Indian Christians.

In the 1930s and 40s Christians were mainly on the side of the Indian National Congress in its struggle for independence. Several Christian organizations such as the Christian Patriot Group of Madras, and the Indian Christian Association, were organized to express Christian views on political matters.

=== K.T. Paul as the conscience of Indian Christians ===
Paul grew to adulthood at a time when the Indian National Congress was voicing the growing demand of educated Indians for representative Government. Paul was committed to political nationalism, seeing in it also a self-awakening of India that would transform the totality of its traditional life. In his speech at the second session of the Round Table Conference in London (7 to 11 September 1931), Gandhi said of K.T. Paul, "I miss as I have no doubt all of you miss, the presence in our midst of K.T. Paul. Although, I do not know, so far as I know, though he never officially belonged to the Congress, he was a nationalist to the full."

As the secretary of the National Missionary Society, and later as the National General Secretary of the YMCA, Paul helped to prevent the Christian community from becoming a 'communal' group. He saw a 'designed place of necessity' for nationalism in the purpose of God for mankind.

Paul as a nationalist recommended the indigenization of even the structure of the Indian Church. He was opposed to the Western type of church structure in India, especially episcopacy. He argued that episcopacy was a product of the West, that it was foreign to the genius of India, that the prophet and not the priest would suffice for the religious life of India, that if the united church in South India fell into the clutches of episcopacy it would be fettered perpetually by western forms since such a union would be a patched-up union, unrelated in any way to what was essentially Indian.

=== Christian Nationalist ===
As a Christian Nationalist and a devote Christian leader, Paul saw the rising nationalist feelings in a different dimension. In order to understand his position as a true nationalist one has to look into the then political situations from 1919 to 1930. In 1919 Montagu–Chelmsford Reforms were introduced which were not accepted by Congress. At this time the Government also passed the Rowlatt Act under the pretext of eradicating terrorism. Most of the Indian leaders thought that these measures were against liberty and thus a betrayal. As a result, the Satyagraha Movement was started by Mahatma Gandhi. At first, Paul did not agree with Gandhi's policy. In the tragedy of Chauri Chaura, a number of policemen were brutally beaten to death by a gang of people who claimed to be Gandhi's followers. This was followed by the Bombay riot. Gandhi suspended the whole Satyagraha indefinitely. But on 10 March 1922, Gandhi was arrested.

Immediately after this, Paul was invited by the Viceroy to become a member of the first Round Table Conference. There his main emphasis was on national unity, although he was unable to influence matters much in the political fields of India.

With the partition of Bengal in 1905, the Swadeshi movement had been inaugurated. One way in which the Indian Christians responded to it was by developing indigenous leadership and freedom from foreign domination and dependence within the church. With this idea, the National Missionary Council was founded. It was founded on the principle that it will use only indigenous personnel, methods, and money for its work. The Society was never active in politics but because it was purely Indian in its personal and management, it continued to express sympathy for the national movement. The National Missionary Council (NMC) was established in 1912 in Calcutta. NMC comprised British and Indian missionaries. Paul was one of the prominent leaders of this council for many years.

== YMCA and K T Paul ==
Paul was appointed the Joint National General Secretary of the Young Men's Christian Association (YMCA) in India in 1913. Dr. John R. Mott, who had attracted Paul to YMCA service later supported his appointment in 1916 as the first Indian National General Secretary of the YMCA in India. Paul began the process of indigenization of the organization at a time when practically all Christian institutions were headed by Europeans. Paul Indianised the policy and programs, leading to the implementation of innovative programs for the marginalized sections of India. The Rural Reconstruction Scheme was one such program. His vision for the future of the Indian YMCA was rooted in his understanding of his own people – their fears, hopes, and their desperate needs.

The YMCA had thus far been an urban movement with specific objectives. Paul took it in a new direction, mindful of the peculiar problems of rural Indian society as compared to the industrialized, urban, and literate Western society for whose specific needs the YMCA had been created. This however was a herculean task, as Paul had to work out substantial details explaining why the Indian YMCA should take up the rural program and deviate completely from its set path of working for the urban youth.

=== Rural Reconstruction ===
Paul was moved by the appalling conditions of poverty of the rural masses who constituted 90 per cent of India's population. Thus he established Rural YMCA Centres to work for the upliftment of rural young men. At this stage, the missionaries too looked to the YMCA for help in the Mass Movement areas where a large number of Christians who were coming over to Christianity brought their problems of poverty, debt, and depression with them. Such problems could not be solved in a day. The large number of such converts entering the Church proved to be a burden. Therefore, it was at the urgent request of the missionaries that the YMCA began to render help in the field, seeking the cooperation of the church to make it economically possible for those Christians to become honest and self-respecting citizens. Paul worked for the village education scheme and rural reconstruction program through the YMCA and the church.

By launching the Rural Work Programme, Paul had in fact opened a 'campaign against Indian poverty'. No government has so far succeeded in eliminating poverty, but Paul experimented with a methodology to tackle it at its roots. As a keen student of the Indian situation he had taken note of the Co-operative Act passed by Lord Curzon in 1904, followed by another in 1912, meant to help farmers to overcome their serious financial problems. Neither the Co-operative Credit banks of the Government nor its agricultural development departments had succeeded in solving the problem of poverty in rural India.

Paul took an intensive study tour of the poverty-stricken districts to supplement the existing knowledge of both the theory and practice of Indian agriculture. He thought that every Indian problem had its roots in rural conditions.

Under the guidance of Paul, the YMCA took up responsibility for depressed classes in four districts and set up YMCA Credit Societies to help bankrupt farmers. However, it ran into difficulty as the regular District Co-operative Banks of the Government were not willing to give loans to these Societies without adequate property securities of the community who took the loan. Paul's appeal to take the character of the borrower as his credit was rejected by the banks. Social disability which deprived the lower castes, of memberships of government Co-operative Credit societies, was a problem faced by Christians both in north and south India. Paul argued that the disabilities of Christians are so great that if special attention was not given to them it would take a century for the advantages to reach them. Therefore, special treatment was given to them while non-Christians could become shareholders and beneficiaries.

==== Madras Christian Co-operative Bank Ltd ====
Paul decided that if other banks did not give credit, the YMCA should organize a Central Co-operative Bank of its own. He was encouraged in his venture by his friend L. D. Swamikannu Pillai, the Registrar of Co-operative Societies. Madras Christian Co-operative Bank Ltd was started in 1916, with the intention of 25 per cent of net profits being carried to the Reserve Fund and 9 per cent paid as dividends. Although organizations established by Paul were never exclusively for Christians, the presence of Christian communities in the area was a pre-requisite.

==== Paul's Anti-Poverty Strategy ====
Then as it is now illiteracy was the bane of India and has been largely responsible for poverty and uncontrolled population growth breeding greater illiteracy and thus creating a vicious circle. The Rural Reconstruction Programme was aimed at removing this ignorance and illiteracy in the villages. The slogan, "5 Ds are the enemies of the villagers" (Debt, Drink, Disease, Darkness, and the Devil), was adopted. By 1921, rural work had begun to produce productive results. Nearly 40,000 people had been reached and helped towards gaining economic independence. In one of the Districts in Bengal, an entire village of outcastes had been liberated. In another village in Madras, the crops of the outcaste converts had increased a hundredfold.

=== Social Work ===
Paul began his social work when he was in the YMCA, which before his time was entirely an urban organization. In the rural areas of India, Christians suffered without any monetary or other kinds of help. In 1912, he decided to extend the cooperative credit movement to rural areas. This formed the basis of his other work in rural areas, which had social, physical, and religious themes also.

An important outcome of this Rural Work was the appeal it made to the young educated Indian Christians. With the prevailing wave of Nationalism, the young men were asking "How can I best serve India?” A large number of young men were responding positively to this nationalistic fervour in developing the rural work started by Paul. It provided scope for such Christian young men to identify themselves with the nationalistic aspirations of the people by working for their upliftment. Nationalistic zeal and drive for indigenization among Indian Christians found fulfilment in rural work.

== Bibliography ==
- "Indian Christian Leadership." Harvest Field, March 1913: 94–104.
- K. T. Paul, The British Connection With India (1928).
- K. T. Paul, Christianity and Indian Nationhood.
- opley, Herbert A. K. T. Paul. 1938. Reprint, Chennai: Christian Literature Society, 1987.
- Eddy, Sherwood. Pathfinders of the World Missionary Crusade. New York: Abingdon-Cokesbury, 1945.
