= Surendra Kumar Datta =

Surendra Kumar Datta MBE (1878–1942), also spelt as Surendra Kumar Dutta or S. K. Dutta, was the president of the All India Conference of Indian Christians (AICIC) and thus the Indian Christian delegate to the Second round Table Conference in London, as well as a prominent YMCA leader, and a member of Central Legislative Assembly – also called Imperial Legislative Assembly before Indian independence – a lower house of a bicameral parliament synonymous to the current Lok Sabha after Indian independence.

== Biography ==
=== Life ===
He was born in Lahore, colonial India, in 1878, and got educated in Lahore. He did Medicine from University of Edinburgh, Edinburgh. He married Rena Carswell, a Scottish Irish woman and secretary in the World Student Christian Federation(WSCF) in Geneva. He served as the lecturer teaching history and biology between 1909 and 1914 in Forman Christian College, Lahore. He served as principal between 1932 and 1942, and later became the president of the same college.

=== YMCA leader ===
He succeeded K. T. Paul as general secretary of Young Men's Christian Association(YMCA) and eventually became president of the Indian YMCA. He worked as national secretary of the YMCAs of India, Burma, and Ceylon(present Sri Lanka) from 1919 to 1927. He along with K.T. Paul and V.S. Azariah were the prominent YMCA leaders, though, YMCA didn't directly involve in politics as it was run by the financial support of foreign donors beside an evangelistic agency, formed under the initiatives of missionaries; however, under the leadership of K.T. Paul and S.K. Datta, they made the YMCA known and respected not only in India but also in Europe and North America. He served as president of the AICIC in 1925, 1933, and 1934. After a lengthy service with YMCA, S.K. Datta was also associated with WSCF along with his wife Rena Datta. In June 1918, he was appointed a member of the Order of the British Empire (MBE) for services in the YMCA during the First World War.

=== National delegate ===
He served as a nominated[appointed] member of Central Legislative Assembly to represent Indian Christian community, before Indian independence and Indian partition, from 1924 to 1926, and gave an address at the International Missionary Council meeting held at Lake Mohonk in 1921 and Jerusalem in 1928. As an Indian Christian delegate, he attended Second Round Table Conference held in London between September and December 1931—K.T. Paul and S.K. Dutta, though not followers of Gandhi and represented Indian christian community, they indeed made efforts to bring reconciliation among the opposing leaders who took part in the conference, including Gandhi, Sarojini Naidu, Madan Mohan Malaviya, Muhammad Iqbal, Ghanshyam Das Birla, Mirza Ismail, and more.

As an editor of YMCA's periodical The Young Men of India, he edited many articles like India and racial relationships and promoted national consciousness among the Indian Christians during the national movement. By 1930, prominent Indian Christian(Protestant) leaders like V.S. Azaraih, K.T. Paul, V. Chakkarai(V. Chakka Rai), and S.K. Dutta have come to conclusions that Indian christians would best integrate themselves into national life if they didn't cast themselves as a separate political entity. They also realized that a separate Christian electorate would further alienate them from national culture and amount to a form of compulsory segregation. In 1930, All Indian Christian Council proclaimed that "the place of a minority in a nation is its value to the whole nation and not merely to itself." [sic] In Second Round Table conference, both K.T. Paul and S.K. Datta representing Protestants took a determined stand against turning Indian Christians into a Communal political entity by Britain—imposing on them Communal representation, Communal electorate, and other Communal safeguards.

A biography of S.K. Datta with name S.K. Datta and his people was published by Margarita Barns.

=== President of the All India Conference of Indian Christians ===
S.K. Datta served as the president of the AICIC, which advocated for the interests of the Christian community of colonial India. He represented Indian Christians in the Second round Table Conference, agreeing with Mahatma Gandhi in his views on minorities and Depressed Classes. Surendra Kumar Datta served as the principal of Forman Christian College in Lahore from 1932 to 1942. During his tenure, he emphasized the integration of liberal arts education with Christian values, aiming to elevate the college's standing as a premier institution in colonial India. His leadership contributed to the development of graduates who significantly impacted Indian society. On 2 November 1932, Dr. Datta was inducted as the first Indian principal of Forman Christian College by the President of the Board of Directors. This appointment marked a significant shift toward greater Indian leadership in institutions that were previously dominated by foreign missionaries.

== Devout christian ==
=== Critic of Hinduism ===
He was a devout Christian and critic of Hinduism, who believed that the Indian religions do indeed search for the truth, yet argued that they didn't provide moral and spiritual support for reform and renewal. He denounced Hinduism philosophy and its doctrines, especially Karma and Transmigration in weakening the demand for moral responsibility and social reform; according to him, only the basic teachings of Christianity could give hope to the people of India—the righteousness of God, the moral order of the created universe, the redeeming love of God manifest in Jesus Christ. He further emphasized a two-fold contribution of Christianity to India through the work of educational institutions, and through the visible Indian church, which he believed to be influential far beyond its minority status.

=== Critic of Western Christianity ===
He was cynical about Indian church for lack of spiritual depth, absence of a distinctive Indian Christian theology, and dependence on foreign leadership and money. He was even critical about the caste system operating within the Indian churches.

== Works ==
- The desire of India.
- The Christian Student and the Indian Church.

== See also ==
- Round Table Conferences (India)
