= Indian Liberal Party =

Political party in British India

The Liberal Party of India, officially called the "National Liberal Federation of India" (NLFI), was a political organization espousing liberalism in the politics of India.

== History and organization ==
The Indian Liberal Party, officially the "National Liberal Federation of India" (NLFI), was formed in 1919, with British intellectuals and British officials often participating members of its committees. The Indian National Congress, which had been formed to create a mature political dialogue with the British government, included both moderates and extremists. The division between the two groups on the goal of independence and the methods to achieve said goals created a growing rift within the Indian National Congress.

When the Montagu report of 1918 was made public, there was a divide in the Congress over it. The moderates welcomed it while the extremists opposed it. With extremists such Bipin Chandra Pal, Lala Lajpat Rai and Bal Gangadhar Tilak rising to dominate the conversation within the Indian National Congress, moderates began to organize separate conventions to oppose the extremists. This growing schism led to the separation of a group of moderates from the Indian National Congress in 1919, and the official founding of The National Liberal Federation of India (NLFI) by Surendranath Banerjee and other prominent moderates such as Tej Bahadur Sapru, V. S. Srinivasa Sastri and M. R. Jayakar.

Among its many influential members, Tej Bahadur Sapru emerged as a leading voice of the party. During the agitation against the Simon Commission, he launched the idea of an all-parties conference in India to prepare an agreed constitutional scheme. The parties members, prior to the "Nehru Report", collaborated with Annie Besant's All-India Home Rule League, to create the "Commonwealth of India Bill, 1925". The Bill was introduced at the British Parliament by George Lansbury but was quickly voted down by Baldwin's Conservative Government. This suggestion, however, set off a series of discussions among India's various parties, resulting in the official convening of an All Parties Conference under the Chairmanship of Indian National Congress President Motilal Nehru in 1928. At the conference, the NLFI was officially represented by Tej Bahadur Sapru, with NLFI member M. R. Jayakar also present but as the official representative of the Akhil Bharatiya Hindu Mahasabha, rather than the NLFI. The conference produced the "Nehru Report", which proposed a constitution and persuaded the new Labour government in Britain to offer India a Round Table Conference.

A number of Liberals including Sapru and Sastri attended the first Round Table Conference (November 1930 to January 1931). They rallied the Indian Princes to the idea of an all-India federal union. Sapru and Sastri likewise attacked the communal issue, working primarily through Muhammad Ali Jinnah. The two Liberals' ultimate object was to secure a constitutional agreement.

== Politics ==
The Liberals were moderate nationalists who openly pursued India's independence from British rule and resented the excesses of British imperialism. They preferred gradual constitutional reform to revolutionary methods as the means of achieving independence and because they attempted to secure constitutional reform by cooperating with British authority rather than defying it. Their goals and methods were inspired by British Liberalism. They aimed toward parliamentary democracy, including not only an institutional structure but a system of values which emphasized the achievement of national welfare through peaceable negotiation and compromise among competing public interests. Therefore, the Liberals regularly participated in the legislative councils and assemblies at the town, provincial and central levels.

The Government of India Act 1919 expanded the membership to the legislatures. The Liberals entered the new legislatures and attempted to make the reforms succeed so as to advance India far toward full self-government. They tried to persuade the British that Indians were a loyal opposition and well prepared for self-government, and trying also to build Indian self-respect and prove that revolutionary upheaval was unnecessary as well as dangerous. They urged for further constitutional reform, asking for an expanded Indian role in both provincial and central government. However, they had a minority position in the legislatures and hence were weakened.

In the legislative elections of 1923, most Liberal candidates were defeated, but some were returned in both the Center and the provinces, while even some of the principal leaders regained seats through nomination. Their influence during 1924–1926 depended largely on their relations with the other main parties in the Central Legislative Assembly, such as the Swaraj Party. The Liberals often voted with these other parties, though they usually went separate ways from the Swaraj Party on highly controversial issues. In general, however, they continued to occupy a slightly more conservative position than the other parties. In 1925, the Liberals joined the Swaraj Party to demand a Round Table Conference to discuss constitutional reforms.

The Liberals urged in advance that the Statutory Commission, scheduled under the terms of the Indian Reform Act of 1919 to review the case for further Indian constitutional advance, have both British and Indian members. However an all-English Commission was announced under Sir John Simon. The Liberals were among the first to denounce it and called for a boycott.

== See also ==
- Liberalism in India
- Indian independence movement
- Indian National Congress
- Indian nationalism
- Leaders of the Indian independence movement
