= Pahar Singh Judeo =

Raja of Sarila (1788–1898)

- Raja

Raja of Sarila
- Reign: 19 August 1882 – 22 February 1898
- Predecessor: Khallak Singh
- Successor: Mahipal Singh
- Born: 1875
- Died: 22 February 1898 (aged 22–23)
- Issue: Mahipal Singh
- House: Sarila
- Dynasty: Bundela

Pahar Singh Ju Deo was Raja of Sarila from 1882 until his death in 1898.

== Early life ==
He was born in 1875. He was educated at Daly College, Indore.

== Reign ==
When Khallak Singh, the Raja of Sarila, died childless in 1882, his widows adopted Pahar Singh as his successor, and his adoption was sanctioned by the Government of India. He succeeded Khallak to his title, rank, and dignity on 19 August 1882. As he was a minor at the time, Rao Sambhar Singh was appointed to administer the affairs of the state until he came of age. He was granted full administrative powers in 1895.

== Personal life ==
He married the daughter of one of the leading jagirdar of Charkhari. A son, Mahipal Singh Ju Deo, was born posthumously to him on 11 September 1898.

== Death ==
He died on 22 February 1898 and was succeeded by Mahipal Singh Ju Deo.
