= John Coatman =

British administrator and author (1889–1963)

John Coatman, CIE, (1889–1963) was director of public information for the Indian Police Service and the British government in India. He was made a Companion of the Order of the Indian Empire in 1929 and was a member of the secretariat during the first Round Table Conference (November 1930 – January 1931). His writing promoted the benefits of the British Empire.

== Selected publications ==
- Report of the administration of Lord Reading, Viceroy and Governor-General of India, 1921–1926: General summary, Government of India Press, Simla, 1927.
- The Indian Riddle: A solution suggested, Humphrey Toulmin, London, 1932.
- Years of Destiny India 1926–1932, 1932.
- Magna Britannia, Jonathan Cape, London, 1936.
- India the Road to Self Government, George Allen & Unwin, 1941.
- The British Family of Nations, George G. Harrap & Co., London, 1950.
- Volkerfamilie commonwealth: die verwirklichung eines politischen ideals, Deutsch Verlags-Anstalt, Stuttgart, 1950.
- Police, Oxford University Press, 1959. (Home University Library of Modern Knowledge)
- Eric Charles Handyside, C.I.E., O.B.E., Indian Police, Tunbridge Wells, c. 1962.
