= All India Conference of Indian Christians =

Indian ecumenical organisation

The All India Conference of Indian Christians (AICIC) is an ecumenical organisation founded in 1914 to represent the interests of Christians in India. It was founded to advocate for the moral, economic, and intellectual development of the Indian Christian community. The AICIC held its first meeting on 28 December 1914 and was led by Raja Sir Harnam Singh of Kapurthala, who was the president of the National Missionary Society (NMS); the first AICIC General Secretary was B. L. Rallia Ram of Lahore. Its creation sought to unite under one umbrella organisation the local and regional Indian Christian Associations that existed in Bombay, Madras, Hyderabad, Punjab, United Provinces, Bengal and Burma. At the time of the Indian independence movement, the organisation allied itself with the Indian National Congress and the resolutions passed by AICIC advocated communal harmony, while also pressing for the rights of Christians in both colonial India and independent India. The India Conference of Indian Christians advocated for self-rule in a united and independent country, opposing the partition of India. During the era of the British Raj in India, the AICIC served as the mouthpiece for members of the Indian Christian community, conducting membership drives to boost its base, which included Protestant and Catholic Christians. As such, the presidents of the AICIC represented the Christians of undivided India at the Round Table Conferences.

== History ==
=== Colonial India ===
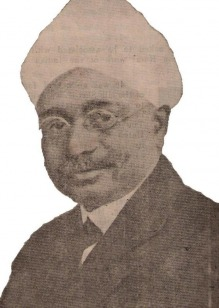
K.T. Paul of Salem became the president of the All India Conference of Indian Christians in 1923, representing the Christian community of Undivided India at the Second Round Table Conference.

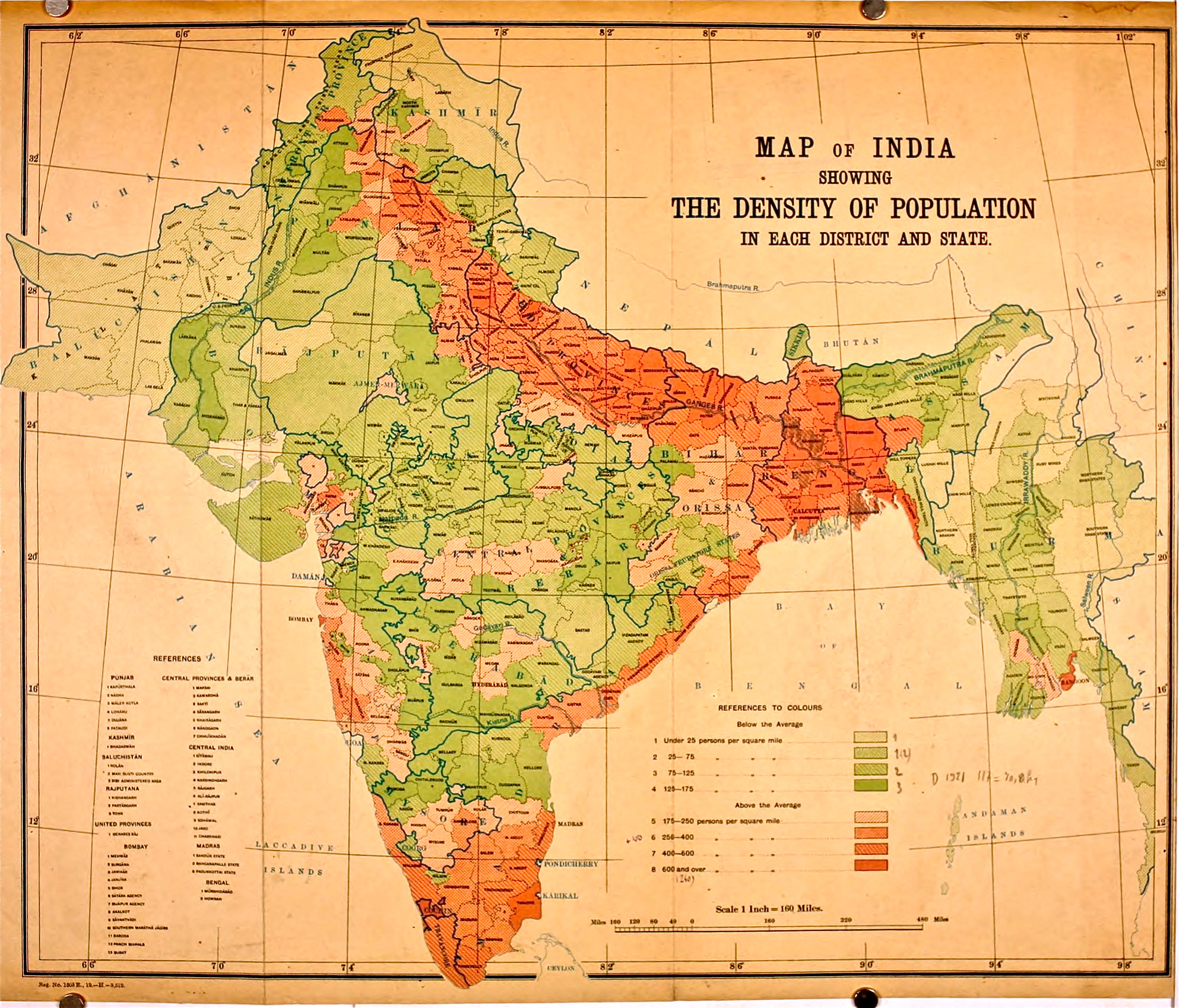
The All India Conference of Indian Christians played an important role in the Indian independence movement, advocating for self-rule of the country by Indians and opposing the partition of India.

In its early stages of the nationalist movement in colonial India, Indian Christians were heavily involved in the Indian National Congress and wider Indian independence movement:

Indian Christian involvement in the early stages of the nationalist movement is also reflected in the high levels of participation in the activities of the Indian National Congress. During the period from its inception up until about 1892 all the evidence suggests that Indian Christians enthusiastically supported the National Congress and attended its annual meetings. For example, according to the official Congress report, there were 607 registered delegates at the Madras meeting of 1887; thirty-five were Christians and, of these, seven were Eurasians and fifteen were Indian Christians. Indian Christians alone made up 2.5 per cent of the total attendance, in spite of the fact that Christians accounted for less than 0.79 per cent of the population. The Indian Christian community was also well represented at the next four sessions of the Congress. The proportion of Indian Christian delegates remained very much higher than their proportion in the population, in spite of the fact that meetings were sometimes held in cities such as Allahabad and Nagpur, far removed from the main centres of Christian population.

In 1916, Indian Christians as a whole appreciated the leadership of Mahatma Gandhi, who placed an emphasis on nonviolence and communal harmony, which reassured Christians of a secure future in an independent India. In 1923, a large conference of Indian Christians assembled in Ranchi, located in the Bihar and Orissa Province of colonial India, where they resolved that "Swaraj [freedom], Nationalism, or self-determination helps the Self-realisation of a people and is consistent with the Christian religion and helpful to the Christian life."

The December 1922 AICIC meeting in Lahore, which had a large attendance of Punjabis, resolved that the Church in India should draw its leadership from the ranks of Indians, rather than foreigners. The AICIC also stated that Indian Christians would not tolerate any discrimination based on race or skin colour.

The AICIC met in 1922 in Lucknow, acknowledging those Christians who were imprisoned as a result of their participation in the nationalist movement.

In 1923, K. T. Paul from Salem became the president of the AICIC; he brought with him a rejection of racism, opposition to foreign missionary control, a service orientation, and a friendly approach towards people of other faiths. Paul represented Indian Christians in the First Round Table Conference in London. Following his death, Gandhi praised Paul for his nationalism; S. K. Datta of Lahore, who served as the principal of Forman Christian College, replaced K. T. Paul and shared Mahatma Gandhi's views on minorities and Depressed Classes.

In 1927, leaders of the AICIC, including both Roman Catholics and Protestants, advocated the notion that Christians "should participate as common citizens in one common, national political system", rather than pressing for separate electorates.

In 1928, as a part of the All Parties Conference, the All-India Conference of Indian Christians met in Lucknow with other Indian political organisations to draft the Nehru Report, which was an early version of the Constitution of India.

E.C. Dewick, a Christian missionary from Great Britain, commented on the role of Indian Christians in the Indian independence movement:

The old traditions of loyalty to the British Raj, and the imitation of the West in dress and social customs have steadily been giving place to a much more nationalistic outlook, and to the expressions of this in national costume and national habits. A growing number of the younger Indian Christians have been gathering to raise their voices in criticism of the British Government, and have joined with their Hindu friends in the No-Cooperation and Civil Disobedience Movements.

Indian Christians thus saw themselves as being able to contribute to the Indian nation, not only in terms of educational and welfare projects, but to mediate disputes between different parties in the country.

In 1932, Aloysius Soares promoted the concept in the Catholic journal Week that minority communities should be protected in the Constitution of India and bill of rights. Catholic and Protestant leaders met in Poona in October 1932 and endorsed this, approving Soares' Fundamental Rights, which began: "Every person in the Indian Federation or Commonwealth shall be free to profess and practise his religion, including the right to make conversions, and, subject to public order and morality, exercise acts of public worship." This was incorporated into the Indian Constitution in 1950.

P. Chenchiah and other Indian Christian leaders saw the interests of Christians, Hindus and Muslims as being the same, holding that "a stronger sense of national identity, far from threatening the sense of religious identity, could be seen as enriching and complementary, and as providing further outlets for good will and collaboration in the newly emerging and all-embracing nation state." The AICIC was praised by Kashmiri Indian freedom fighter H. N. Kunzru, who at its 1943 meeting, stated that: "it was heartening to find that the Christians are struggling for unity, when threats of division are overwhelming."

On 30 October 1945, the AICIC joined with the Catholic Union of India calling for: "in the future constitution of India, the profession, practice and propagation of religion should be guaranteed and that a change of religion should not involve any civil or political disability." This move enabled the Christians in India to stand united that "the committee members unanimously supported the move for independence and expressed complete confidence in the future of the community in India." The joint committee opened an office in Delhi, that the Vice-Chancellor of Andhra University M. Rahnasamy served as President and B. L. Rallia Ram of Lahore served as General Secretary. Six members of the joint committee were elected to the Minorities Committee of the Constituent Assembly of India. On 16-17 April 1947, the joint committee of the AICIC and All India Catholic Union prepared a 13 point memorandum that was forwarded to the Constituent Assembly, calling for religious freedom; this would come to be reflected in the Constitution of India.

The AICIC opposed India's partition and the creation of a separate Muslim state.

On 24-25 March 1947, the Honourable Dr. John Mathai, a member of the interim government, presided over the 27th session of the AICIC, with national leaders including Jawaharlal Nehru, Vijaya Lakshmi Pandit, Sarojini Naidu and B. G. Kher delivering speeches.

The nationalist movement in India gave impetus to the ecumenical movement in India, which eventually resulted in the creation of united Protestant Churches after independence, such as the Church of South India. Indian Christians were more concerned with "their economic survival, social status, or relations with non-Christian neighbours" rather than merely Christian denominational divisions.

=== Independent India ===
From 1953 to 1963, Y. Santram served as the General Secretary of the AICIC.. David Shaw, a former member of the Bombay Legislative Council, would follow.

== See also ==
- Composite nationalism
