= B. L. Rallia Ram =

Indian politician

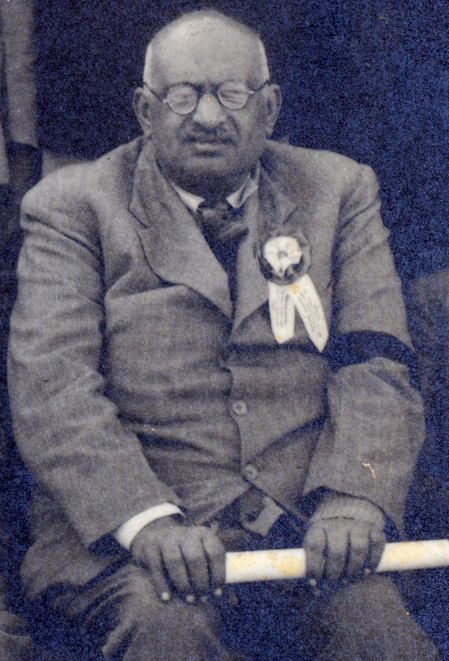
B. L. Rallia Ram

Bihari Lal Rallia Ram was an anti-colonial politician associated with the Indian National Congress and the founding secretary of All India Conference of Indian Christians. After partition, Ram stayed in Pakistan and launched the All Pakistan Christian League. In April 1950, he was inducted as a representative of Punjab in the Constituent Assembly of Pakistan.

Ram was a graduate from University of Lahore, and a staunch adherent of Gandhi. (Note: He had a sister, K. L. Rallia Ram who had similar political ideologies but went on to become a close confidante of Jinnah and supported the Partition.) In British India, he was involved with several Christian organizations — as National General Secretary of the YMCA of India, Burma and Ceylon, and Secretary of the Punjab Indian Christian Association. From 1940 to 1945, Ram served as an honorary treasurer of the Indian Olympic Association.
