= Gandhi–Irwin Pact =

1931 agreement between Mahatma Gandhi and the Viceroy of India, Irwin

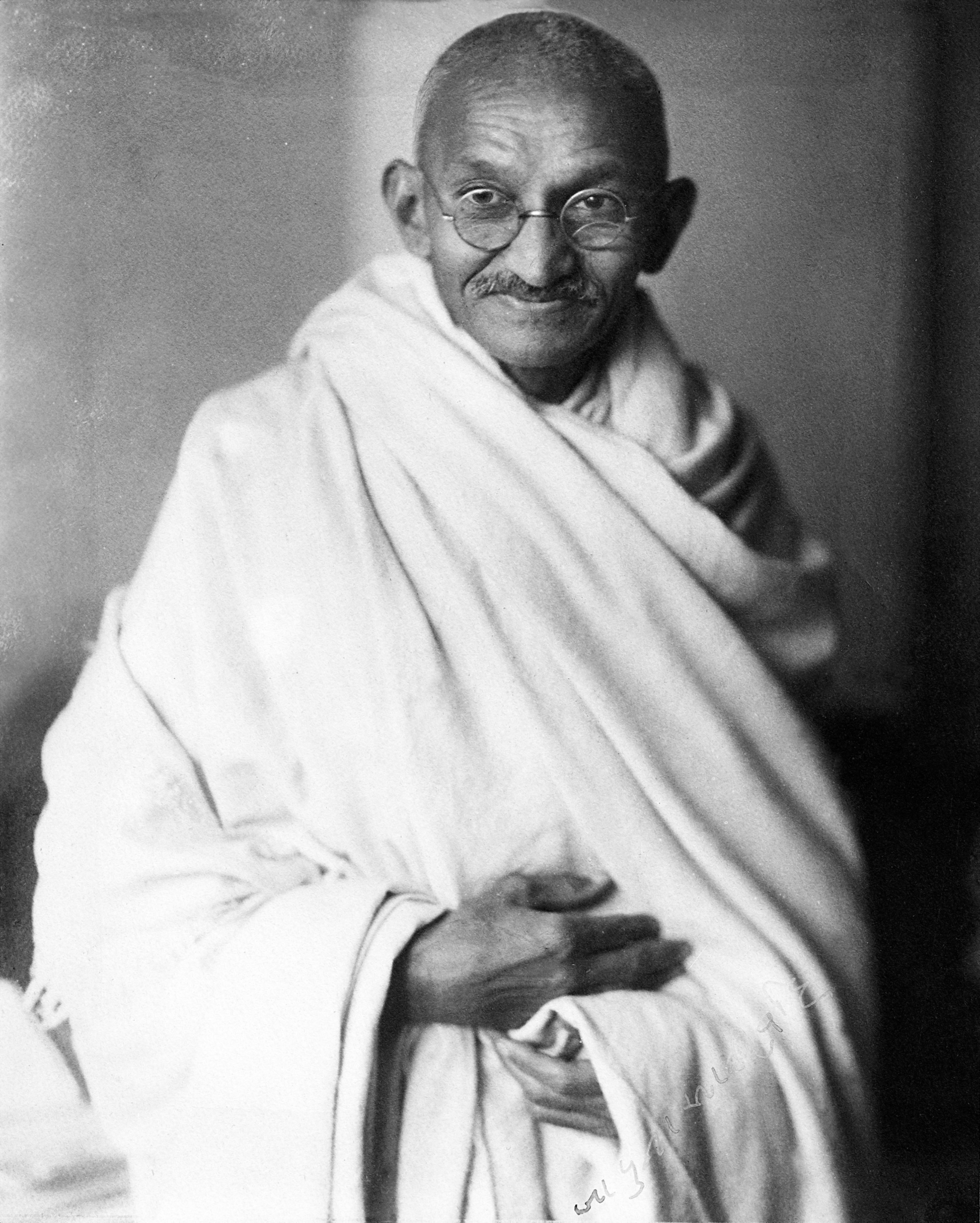
Mahatma Gandhi

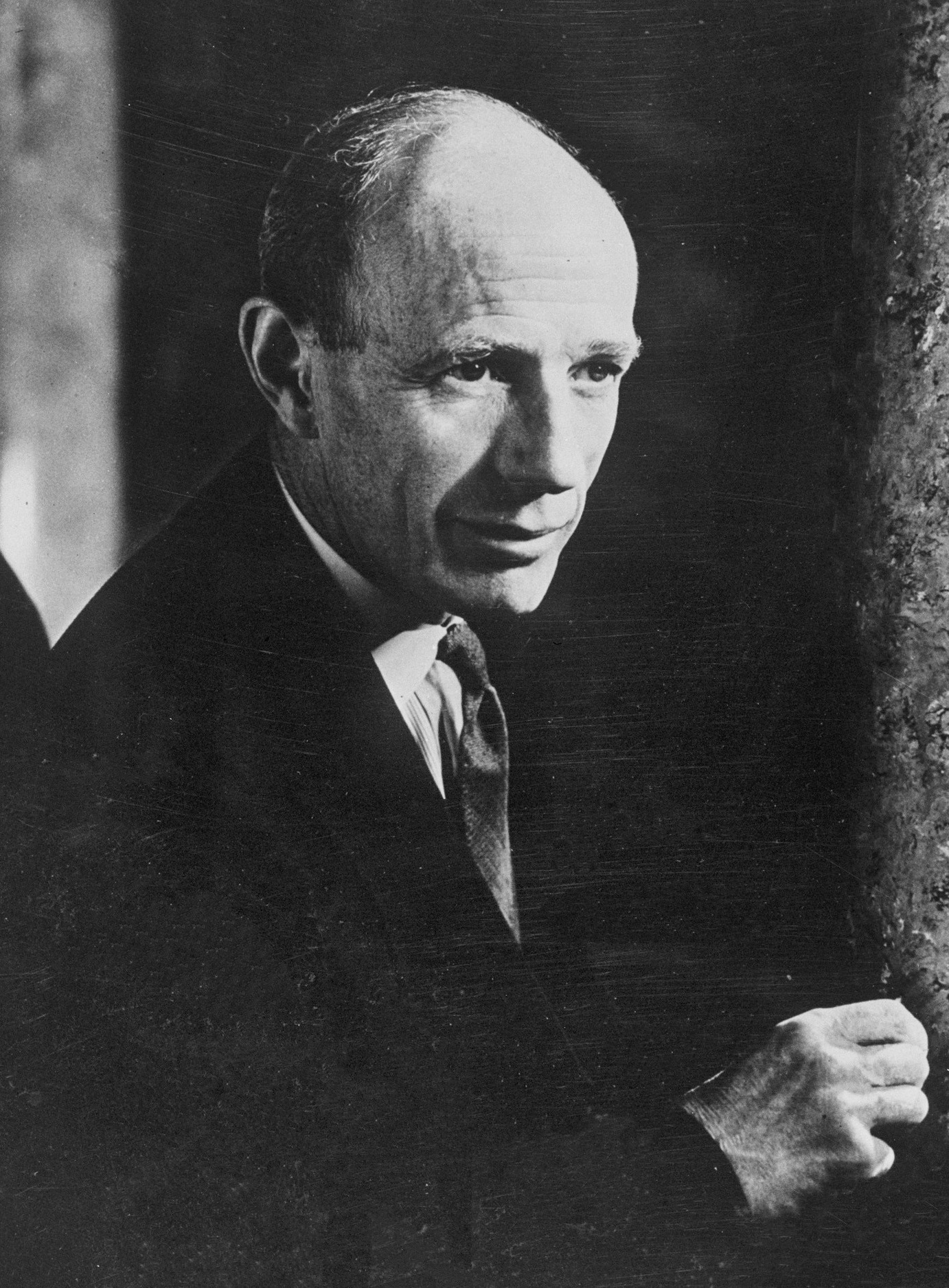
Lord Irwin

The Gandhi–Irwin Pact was a political agreement signed by Mahatma Gandhi and Lord Irwin, Viceroy of India, on 5 March 1931 before the Second Round Table Conference in London. Before this, Irwin, the Viceroy, had announced in October 1929 a vague offer of 'dominion status' for India in an unspecified future and a Round Table Conference to discuss a future constitution. The Second Round Table Conference was held from September to December 1931 in London. This conference marked the end of the Civil Disobedience Movement in India.

Gandhi and Lord Irwin had eight meetings that totalled 24 hours. Although Gandhi was impressed by Irwin's sincerity, the terms of the pact fell manifestly short of those Gandhi had prescribed as the minimum for a truce.

Gandhi managed to have over 90,000 political prisoners released under the Gandhi–Irwin Pact.

== Background ==
Lord Irwin at this time headed the repression of Indian nationalism, but did not relish the role, with British-run Indian Civil Service and the commercial community then favouring even harsher measures. Prime Minister Ramsay MacDonald and William Benn, His Majesty's Principal Secretary of State for India, were eager for peace so long as it didn't weaken the position of the Labour government. As such, they wished for the success of the Round Table Conference and knew that it would carry little weight without the presence of Gandhi. In January 1931, at the closing session of the Round Table Conference, Ramsay MacDonald expressed hope that the Congress would be represented at the next session. The Viceroy, taking the hint, promptly ordered the unconditional release of Gandhi and all members of the Congress Working Committee, who were imprisoned for the Civil Disobedience Movement. In response, Gandhi agreed to meet the Viceroy.

This was the second high-level meeting between Gandhi and a Viceroy in 13 years and should be read in the context of the Montagu–Chelmsford Reforms that were the basis of the Government of India Act, 1919.

== Proposed conditions ==
- Discontinuation of the Salt March by the Indian National Congress
- Participation by the Indian National Congress in the Second Round Table Conference
- Withdrawal of all ordinances issued by the Colonial government of India imposing curbs on the activities of the Indian National Congress
- Withdrawal of all prosecutions relating to several types of political offenses (Rowlatt Act) except those involving violence
- Release of prisoners arrested for participating in the Salt March; and
- Removal of the tax on salt, which allowed the Indians to produce, trade, and sell salt legally and for their own private use

Many British officials in India, and in Britain, were outraged by the idea of a pact with a party whose avowed purpose was the destruction of the British Raj. Winston Churchill publicly expressed his disgust "...at the nauseating and humiliating spectacle of this one-time Inner Temple lawyer, now seditious fakir, striding half-naked up the steps of the Viceroy’s palace, there to negotiate and parley on equal terms with the representative of the King Emperor."

== Agreed terms by Government ==
- Withdraw all ordinances and end prosecutions
- Release all political prisoners, except those guilty of violence
- Permit peaceful picketing of liquor and foreign cloth shops
- Restore confiscated properties of the satyagrahis
- Permit free collection or manufacture of salt by persons near the sea-coast
- Lift the ban over the Congress

== Not agreed terms ==
- Congress' demand of enquiring into police excess.
- Gandhi's demand of converting death penalty of Bhagat Singh, Rajguru and Sukhdev to lesser punishment.

== See also ==
- Poona Pact
- Civil disobedience movement
- Non cooperation movement
