= M. R. Jayakar =

Indian lawyer and politician (1823–1859)

Mukund Ramrao Jayakar, PC
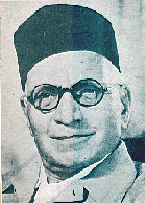

Member of Bombay Legislative Council
- In office 1952–1957

Vice Chancellor of Pune University
- In office 1948 - 1956
- Preceded by: position established
- Succeeded by: R.P. Paranjpye

Personal details
- Born: November 13, 1873
- Died: March 10, 1959 (aged 85) Bombay, India
- Party: Swaraj Party
- Other political affiliations: Indian National Congress; Hindu Mahasabha; National Liberal Federation
- Occupation: Lawyer, academic, freedom fighter and politician

The Right Honourable Mukund Ramrao Jayakar, PC (13 November 1873 – 10 March 1959) was an Indian Lawyer, scholar and politician. He was the first Vice-Chancellor of the University of Poona.

Jayakar was born in a Marathi Pathare Prabhu family.

Jayakar studied for his LL.B. in Bombay in 1902, and became a barrister in 1905 in London. In 1905, he was enrolled as an advocate of the Bombay High Court. He was Director of The Bombay Chronicle along with Jinnah.

He was a member of the Bombay Legislative Council during 1923–1925, and a leader of the Swaraj Party. He also became member of Central Legislative Assembly. In 1937, he became a Judge of the Federal Court of India at Delhi. In December 1946, he joined the Constituent Assembly of India. He was also the chairman of the Indian Road Development Committee, formed in 1927 to report recommendations regarding highway development. He was a member of the Hindu Mahasabha and the Indian National Liberal Federation. He took part in the All Parties Conference in 1928, and was responsible for denying demands of the Muslim League put forward by Muhammad Ali Jinnah.

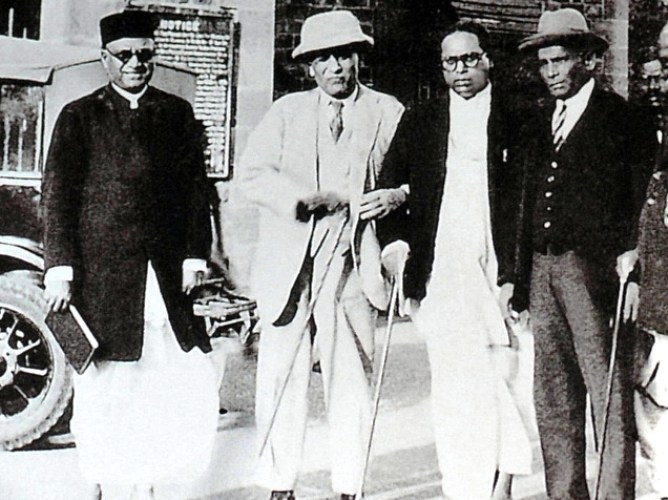
M. R. Jayakar, Tej Bahadur Sapru and B. R. Ambedkar at Yerawada Central Jail, in Poona, on 24 September 1932, the day the Poona Pact was signed

He was also Chairman of the advisory board of Kaivalyadhama Yoga Institute.

He died on 10 March 1959 at Bombay at the age of 86.

== Writings ==
Published works:

Social Reform and Social Service (Madras: Theosophical Society, 1917)

(ed.) Kirtikar, V. J., Studies in Vedanta (Bombay: Taraporevala, 1924)

The Story of My Life (Bombay: Asia Publishing House, 1958)

Contributions to periodicals:

Letter to Times of India, 22 May 1931, criticising India Society and promotion of Bengal school of art

Secondary works:

Bakshi, S. R. (ed.), M. R. Jayakar (New Delhi: Anmol, 1994)

Brown, Judith M., Gandhi’s Rise to Power (Cambridge: Cambridge University Press, 1972)

Dhanki, Joginder Singh (ed.), Perspectives on Indian National Movement: Selected Correspondence of Lala Lajpat Rai (New Delhi: National Book Organisation, 1998)

Israel, Milton, Communications and Power: Propaganda and the Press in the Indian Nationalist Struggle (Cambridge: Cambridge University Press, 1994)

Kulkarni, V. B., M. R. Jayakar (New Delhi: Government of India, 1970)

Lahiri, Shompa, Indians in Britain: Anglo-Indian Encounters, Race and Identity, 1880-1939 (London: Frank Cass, 2000)

Mitter, Partha, The Triumph of Modernism (London: Reaktion, 2007)

Nehru, Jawaharlal, An Autobiography: With Musings on Recent Events in India (London: Bodley Head, 1936)

== See also ==
- Free Press of India
- University of Pune
