= Communal Award =

1932 statement on minority electorates in British India

The Communal Award was created by British Prime Minister Ramsay MacDonald on 16 August 1932. Also known as the MacDonald Award, it was announced after the Round Table Conference (1930–1932) and extended the separate electorate to the Depressed Classes (now known as the Scheduled Castes) and other minorities. The separate electorate had been introduced by the Indian Councils Act 1909 for the Muslims and extended to the Sikhs, Indian Christians, Anglo-Indians and Europeans by the Government of India Act 1919.

The separate electorate was now available to the Muslims, Sikhs, Indian Christians, Anglo-Indians, Europeans and Depressed Classes (now known as the Scheduled Castes) etc. The principle of weightage was also applied. Sir Samuel Hoare asked for clarification of the ninth and last paragraph, which applied directly to the Depressed Classes. The award favoured the minorities over the Hindus, which caused consternation and elicited anger from Mahatma Gandhi. From the fastness of Yerwada Jail he made contact with the Cabinet in London declaring in September 1932 an open fast until death.

The reason behind introduction of Communal Award was that MacDonald considered himself as 'a friend of the Indians' and thus wanted to resolve the issues in India. The Communal Award was announced after the failure of the Second of the Round Table Conferences (India) and attracted severe criticism from Gandhi.

The Award was controversial as it was perceived by many Hindus to be aimed at causing social divides in India, and Gandhi feared that it would disintegrate Hindu society. However, the Communal Award was supported by many among India's minority communities, most notably B. R. Ambedkar, who insisted on separate electorates for Scheduled Castes. According to Ambedkar, Gandhi was ready to award separate electorates to Muslims and Sikhs but was reluctant to give separate electorates to the Scheduled Castes. He feared division within both Congress and Hindu society from the Scheduled Castes having separate representation.

The Akali Dal, the representative body of the Sikhs, was also highly critical of the Award since only 19% was reserved to the Sikhs in Punjab, as opposed to 51% for the Muslims and 30% for the Hindus. Gandhi concurred with the revival of Swaraj, which became policy in May 1934 on ratification by the All-India Congress Committee. The government reluctantly agreed to lift the ban on Congress and in return received anxious support from the All-India Muslim League, which was still smarting over Gandhi's majoritarianism. After lengthy negotiations, Gandhi reached an agreement with Ambedkar to have a single Hindu electorate, but there would be reserved seats for Scheduled Castes. The Poona Pact rejected any further advancement for the Untouchables but satisfied the other electorates like Muslims, Sikhs, Indian Christians, Anglo-Indians and Europeans since they would remain separate.

During the parliamentary debates on the Government of India Act, the Untouchables gained a notable champion in a Conservative MP, Albert Goodman. He stressed that their poverty should be ameliorated by greater representation in the provincial assemblies. However, the Muslim League remained ambivalent to the Communal Award, and its ratification by the Central Assembly remained a priority.
