= Mahipal Singh Judeo =

Raja of Sarila from 1898 to 1983

Mahipal Singh Ju Deo
- Raja

Raja of Sarila
- Reign: 11 September 1898 – 1983
- Predecessor: Pahar Singh
- Successor: Narendra Singh
- Born: 11 September 1898
- Died: 1983
- House: Sarila
- Dynasty: Bundela
- Father: Pahar Singh
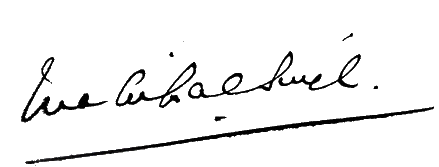
- Signature

Mahipal Singh Ju Deo CSI was the Raja of Sarila from 1898 until his death in 1983.

== Early life, family, and education ==
He was born posthumously on 11 September 1898 to Pahar Singh. He was educated at Daly College, Indore. He married in February 1919 to the daughter of the Thakur of Basela in Hamirpur. He had five sons and three daughters. His sons were Narendra Singh, Jayendra Singh, Virendra Singh, Devendra Singh and Nripendra Singh. His daughters were Sushil Kumari, Saral Kumari and Rajendra Kumari.

== Reign ==
He succeeded his father as Raja of Sarila as an infant at the time of his birth. As he was a minor on the occasion, the state was placed under regency. He was granted full administrative powers on 5 November 1919. In accordance with clause (22) of Article 366 of the Constitution of India, the President of India, via an order issued in 1970, derecognized him as Raja of Sarila.

== Death ==
He died in January 1983.

== Titles and honours ==
Mahipal held the title of Raja. He was called Garib Parwar (transl. protector of the poor) and Ann Data (transl. provider of sustenance) by the people of Sarila. On 8 June 1939, he was made Companion of the Order of the Star of India.
