= Poona Pact =

1932 political truce between Indian independence leaders

The Poona Pact of September 1932 was a negotiated settlement between Mahatma Gandhi and B. R. Ambedkar that increased the political representation of the depressed classes, now known as Scheduled Castes (SC). The Poona Pact was an agreement between nominal Hindus and the Depressed Classes and was signed by 23 people including Madan Mohan Malaviya, on behalf of Hindus and Gandhi, and Dr Bhimrao Ramji Ambedkar on behalf of The Depressed Classes.

== Background ==
In 1909, the allocation of seats based on identity in legislative bodies was made for the first time with the Indian Council Act. The depressed classes were provided some seats in 1919 before seeing further increase in 1925.

The backdrop of the Poona Pact can be traced to the Communal Award of August 1932, which reserved 71 seats in the central legislature for the depressed classes. The Poona Pact was resulted following the separate electorates proposed by British Government under Communal Award for the Depressed Classes, Muslims, Sikhs, Indian Christians and others during the Second Round Table Conference. Gandhi disagreed with the idea of a separate electorate for the Depressed Classes but not for other groups. He began his fast unto death, vehemently opposing this award, viewing it as a British attempt to divide the Hindus.

== Negotiations and Compromises ==
As tensions escalated, negotiations between Gandhi and Ambedkar became inevitable. The crux of the disagreement was Ambedkar's demand for separate electorates for the depressed classes, a proposition Gandhi vehemently opposed. Gandhi's resistance stemmed from his belief that such separation would perpetuate divisions within Hindu society.

The turning point came on 24 September 1932, when the Poona Pact was signed by 23 representatives, including Madan Mohan Malaviya on behalf of Hindus, and Gandhi and Ambedkar representing the depressed classes. The Pact deviated from the Communal Award by allocating 148 seats instead of the originally allotted 80 for the depressed classes in legislative assemblies.

Although Ambedkar was in favor of communal awards, he agreed to sign The Poona Pact. The Poona Pact was signed at 5 pm on 24 September 1932 at Yerwada Central Jail in Poona, India. Gandhi was not one of the signatories of the Poona Pact, but his son, Devdas Gandhi, did sign the pact.

Gandhi, then imprisoned by the British, had embarked on a fast unto death to protest against the decision made by British prime minister Ramsay MacDonald, responding to arguments made by Dr. Babasaheb Ambedkar in the Round Table Conferences, to give separate electorates to depressed classes for the election of members of provincial legislative assemblies in British India. He wrote that separate electorates would "vivisect and disrupt" Hinduism. Ambedkar, for his part, argued that upper-caste reformers could not represent the depressed classes and that they needed their own leaders.

The pact finally settled upon 148 electoral seats. Nearly twice as many seats were reserved for Depressed Classes under the Poona Pact than the 71 seats offered by MacDonald's Communal Award. 8 January 1933 was observed as 'Temple Entry Day'.

== Provisions of the Poona Pact (1932) ==
The Poona Pact of 1932, a pivotal agreement between Mahatma Gandhi and B.R. Ambedkar, laid down crucial provisions shaping the political representation of the Depressed Classes, now referred to as Scheduled Castes.

=== Reserved Seats ===
The agreement stipulated the allocation of reserved seats for the Depressed Classes from the general electorate across various provinces. The distribution was as follows:

- Madras: 30 seats
- Bombay with Sindh: 25 seats
- Punjab: 8 seats
- Bihar and Orissa: 18 seats
- Central Provinces: 20 seats
- Assam: 7 seats
- Bengal: 30 seats
- United Provinces: 20 seats

These numbers were determined based on the total strength of the Provincial Councils outlined in Ramsay MacDonald's decision.

=== Joint Electorates and Primary Elections ===
Elections to these reserved seats were to be conducted through joint electorates, with a unique procedural difference. All members of the Depressed Classes listed in the general electoral roll of a constituency would collectively form an electoral college. This electoral college would then choose a panel of four candidates for each reserved seat through a single vote method. The top four candidates in the primary elections would become the final candidates for the general electorate's consideration.

The same principle of joint electorates and primary elections applied to the representation of the Depressed Classes in the Central Legislature. In this context, 18% of the seats allotted to the general electorate for British India in the Central Legislature were reserved for the Depressed Classes.

=== Duration and Termination ===
A significant point of contention during the negotiations was the duration of the primary election system and reserved seats. Ambedkar proposed automatic termination after a decade, with reserved seats subject to a referendum after 15 years. Gandhi suggested a shorter five-year referendum timeline. The agreed-upon compromise stated that the system of primary elections for panel candidates would conclude after the first ten years, unless terminated earlier by mutual agreement between the communities involved in the settlement.

=== Franchise and Non-Discrimination ===
The pact ensured that the franchise for the Depressed Classes in the Central and Provincial Legislatures aligned with the recommendations of the Lothian Committee Report. Importantly, it guaranteed that no disabilities would be attached to individuals based on their membership in the Depressed Classes concerning elections to local bodies or appointments to public services. Efforts were to be made to secure fair representation for the Depressed Classes in these realms, with consideration for educational qualifications.

=== Educational Facilities ===
In every province, a portion of the educational grant was earmarked to provide adequate educational facilities specifically for members of the Depressed Classes.

=== Duration and Flexibility ===
The system of representation through reserved seats and primary elections would persist until otherwise determined by mutual agreement between the concerned communities. The provision aimed to maintain flexibility for potential adjustments based on evolving circumstances or consensus among the involved parties.

== Impact and legacy ==
The Poona Pact represented a clash between two contrasting views: Gandhi's emphasis on caste reform through social and spiritual means and Ambedkar's insistence on addressing caste as a political issue. Ambedkar argued that political democracy would be meaningless without the equal participation of the depressed classes. The legacy of the Poona Pact endures in India's political landscape. The reserved seats in Parliament and assemblies, allocated based on the population of SCs, aim to provide political representation. However, the current system has faced criticism for diluting the influence of Dalit MPs, as they often represent constituencies where Dalits are a minority.

=== Controversies and Perspectives ===
Controversies surrounding the Poona Pact include debates about whether Gandhi coerced Ambedkar into the agreement. Scholars and writers like Perry Anderson and Arundhati Roy have raised questions about the dynamics of the negotiations. However Gitanjali Surendran says that Ambedkar was content with the outcome, accepting that "reserved seats for dalits, was actually a big step in the recognition of dalit politics."

== See also ==
- Communal Award
- Forward Castes
- Gandhi–Irwin Pact
- Other Backward Classes
- Scheduled Castes and Tribes
- Lucknow Pact
