= Sarila =

- tehsil
- Location in Uttar Pradesh, India Sarila (India)
- Coordinates: 25.77°N 79.68°E
- Country: India
- State: Uttar Pradesh
- District: Hamirpur
- Elevation: 129 m (423 ft)

Population (2001)
  - Total: 7,858

Languages
  - Official: Hindi
- Time zone: UTC+5:30 (IST)
- Vehicle registration: UP 91
- Website: up.gov.in

Sarila is a town, a former princely state and a nagar panchayat in Hamirpur district in the northern Indian state of Uttar Pradesh.

== Geography ==
Sarila is located at 25.77°N 79.68°E. It has an average elevation of 129 m (423 ft). It is situated on Rath-Jalapur Road or MDR-41B. It is 28 km (17 mi) from Rath.

== Administration ==
=== Local self government ===
Sarila is governed by a municipality under the Uttar Pradesh Municipal Act. The council is called a nagar panchayat.

=== Sub district administration ===
Sarila is the headquarters of the subdivision, which is headed by a sub-divisional magistrate (S.D.M.), who is assisted by four officers: one tehsil magistrate and nayab tehsil magistrates.

=== Police administration ===
Sarila city's security is maintained by Sarila Kotwali. Sarila police circle is headed by CO sarila.

== Demographics ==
As of 2001 India census, Sarila had a population of 7,858. Males constitute 53% of the population and females 47%. Sarila has an average literacy rate of 49%, lower than the national average of 59.5%: male literacy is 64%, and female literacy is 33%. In Sarila, 17% of the population is under six years of age.

== History ==
Maharaja Chhatrasal conquered the area now known as Bundelkhand from the Mughals in the 17th century. One of his grandsons, Raja Pahar Singh of Jaitpur, received Sarila, built Sarila fortress and in 1755 founded the Hindu princely state covering 91 km^{2}.

In 1807 Sarila accepted a British protectorate and became a non-salute state under the colonial Bundelkhand Agency.

It had a population of 6,298 in 1901 and a state revenue of 59,147 rupees. The privy purse would be fixed at 18,650 rupees.

The state ceased to exist on 1 January 1950 by accession to Madhya Pradesh.

== Ruling rajas ==
The rulers bore the title of raja.

- Raja Aman Singh, 1st Raja of Sarila 1755/1788, son of Raja Pahar Singh of Jaitpur, died 1778
- Raja Tej Singh, 2nd Raja of Sarila 1788/1818, son of the above
- Raja Anirudh Singh, 3rd Raja of Sarila 1818/1842, son of the above
- Raja Hindupat Singh, 4th Raja of Sarila 1842/1871, died childless
- Raja Khallak Singh, 5th Raja of Sarila 1871/1882
- Raja Pahar Singh, 6th Raja of Sarila 1882/1898, born 1875, son of the above, died 1898
- .... -Regent 11 September 1898 – 5 Nov 1919
- Raja Mahipal Singh Ju Deo, 1919-1947

== Sites and services ==
Jhanda bazaar and Nestle market is a famous area of Sarila's city center.

=== Historical places ===
There are many historical places, princely palace, Hindu temples and mosques located in Sarila.

- Sri Shalleshwar Mandir, located in Jhanda Bazar locality, is the oldest Hindu temple in Sarila. Every year on the occasion of Maha Shivratri, a marriage procession of Lord Shiva is carried out in the whole town. A large crowd from nearby villages gathers around to take part in this.
- Kalka Mandir, located on Mamna Road, is the temple of goddess Kali.

=== Education ===
A number of senior secondary and secondary schools are available in Sarila:

- Sri Shalleshwar inter college
- Government Inter College
- Government I.T.I.
- Sarswati Shishu/Vidhya Mandir inter college
- Abhinav Pragya pg Mahavidhyalaya

=== Banks ===
- Allahabad Bank
- Hamirpur District Co-operative Bank Ltd.
- State Bank of India
- Allahabad UP Gramin Bank
- Aryavart Bank Sarila

== Sources and external links ==
- Indian Princely States on www.uq.net.au as archived on web.archive.org, with coats of arms and genealogy
- WorldStatesmen - India - Princely States K-Z
