= Jathedar Bhai Tehal Singh Dhanju =

Jathedar Bhai Tehal Singh Dhanju (1875 – 20 February 1921) was a Sikh religious figure. He played an important role in awakening the Sikh masses during the Gurdwara Reform Movement in the early 20th century. He work for the liberation of Sikh Gurdwaras from the corrupt Mahants. He is among the list of Sikh martyrs who struggled and volunteered for the liberation of Gurdwara Nankana Sahib from Mahant Narain Das on 20 February 1921. Every year on 21 February at the Shaheedi Asthan, Guru Granth Sahib's Swaroop with bullet marks is brought to Deewan (assembly hall) from 2pm to 4pm for darshan of the Sikh Sangat.

== Early life ==
Bhai Tehal Singh was born in a Kamboj family on Diwali Night of 1875, in Nizampur village, District Amritsar. His father was Sardar Chanda Singh Dhanju and his mother was Sardarani Rukman Kaur Dhanju. The family moved to Chak No 38, Village Nizampur Deva Singh Wala, District Sheikhupur during the colonization of Lower Chenab Bar in the early years of the 19th century. He went to Malaya in 1902 and worked as a watchman in Kualalumpur. He returned to India in 1909 due to family issues. He again left for Malaya in 1911, but returned due to the death of his father in 1915.

== Sikhism ==
Soon after his second return from Malaya, Bhai Tehal Singh took Amrit-pan and joined the Sikh Gurdwara Reform Movement. He helped awaken the migrant Sikh farmers of the Canal Colony, Sheikhupura, and spread the message of Sikh Gurus in villages around Nizampur Deva Singh Wala. He participated in the Political Conference of Dharowal and joined the squad that went to liberate Gurdawara Tarn Taran from Mahant control on 26 January 1921. He was badly injured by the brickbats thrown at the Jatha volunteers by the pujaris. He volunteered in the morcha launched by Sikhs in connection with Gurdwara Rikab Ganj wall in Delhi.

== Liberation of Gurdawara Nankana Sahib ==
His most memorable contribution was in the liberation of Gurdawara Nankana Sahib from Mahant Narain Dass. On 24 January, members of the Akali Dal including Master Tara Singh, Harbans Singh Attari, Master Sundar Singh Lyallpuri, Teja Singh Samundari, Harchand Singh, Kartar Singh Jhabbar, Bhai Dalip Singh Lyallpuri, Jaswant Singh Jhabal and Sardul Singh Kavishar convened a meeting in the "Akali" office, Lyallpur. They decided to hold a Panthik Diwan on 4, 5 and 6 March 1921 in Nankana to take control of the Gurdawara complex from Mahant Narain Das. The Akali leaders learned that the Mahant planned to invite the Akali leaders at Gurdawara Nankana Sahib on 5 March and have them all killed. This news incensed the Sikhs. To foil the plot, Sikh leaders including Jathedar Kartar Singh Jhabbar, Bhai Buta Singh Lyallpuri, Bhai Lachhman Singh Dharowal and Bhai Tehal Singh Nizam Deva Singh wala met on 17 February at Gurdawara Sacha Sauda and decided to lead a Shaheedi Jatha to Gurdawara Nankana Sahib on 29 February and seize control from the Mahant prior to the Panthik Diwan. The planning to send Bhai Buta Singh Lyallpuri directly to Nankana Sahib on 19 February, while two Jathas would be organized under Bhai Lachhman Singh Dharowali and Bhai Kartar Singh Jhabbar that would unite into a single Jatha at Chandar Kot Jhal that evening. The group would reach Gurdawara Nankana Sahib early morning on 20 February and seize control of the Gurdawara.

Bhai Tehal toured villages of Chak No 80, No 38, No 18 and No 10 comprising Nizampur Deva Singh Wala, Mula Singh Wala, Chelewala, Dalla Chand Singh, Thothian, Dhanuwal, Bohoru etc. He assembled a squad of about 150. His Jatha was merged with the 23 Sikhs brought by Jathedar Bhai Lachhman Singh Dharowali.

After performing ardas on 19 February, the Jatha marched towards Nankana Sahib commanded by Jathedar Lachhman Singh Dharowali. When the Jatha reached Chandar Kot Jhal, some among the volunteers decided to wait for the other Jatha from Jathedar Kartar Singh Jhabbar to arrive. Bhai Tehal said, "Dear Khalsa ji, we don't want to wait for anybody. We have taken our resolve at the prayer (Ardaas) and it is imperative for us to move forward now." The Jatha resumed its journey, afterwards following Bhai Tehal and reciting Shabad Gurbani through the night. On 20 February, in the early morning when the Jatha had just entered the outer skirts of Nankana City near Brick-kilns (Bhattha), Chaudhury Pal Singh Layalpuri conveyed a message from Bhai Dalip Singh Sangla to Lachhman Singh urging him to suspend the march.

Chaudhury grabbed Lachhman to stop him. Lacchman had great regard for Bhai Dalip Singh Sangla and thus agreed to disband the Jatha but Tehal pulled Chaudhury Pal Singh away from Lachhman and said, "Khalsa ji, it is time not to stop but to move now. We started from our homes with commitments made under Ardas (prayer) to achieve martyrdom. It is very un-Singh-like to suspend the march and return home...Today is also very special day for us since it coincides with the birth day of Guru Har Rai ji who, though possessed army and weapons, yet did not use them in spite of numerous provocations from his enemies...The worst the Mahant could do is kill us, but who is afraid of death?" He reminded the volunteers to remain peaceful and avoid any provocation.

Enthused by Tehal's speech the entire Shaheedi Jatha including Lacchamn resumed the march following Tehal. At about 5 AM the Jatha were close to the Gurdawara complex. Another messenger, Bhai Waryama Singh (Ram Singh?), arrived with a letter from the Akali leadership. He unsuccessfully tried to persuade Tehal and the Jatha to return. Tehal continued to lead the Jatha towards the Gurdwara. Lachhman and others repeatedly requested him to relent, without result. The Jatha entered Darshni Deohri of the Gurdwara Nankana Sahib at about 6 am. While some of the devotees took seats inside the Prakash Asthan, others sat on the platform and the Baran dari. Lachhman sat on Guru's 'Taabiya' (behind Guru Granth Sahib).

The Mahant got the news of the Jatha's arrival at Chander kot on the evening of 19 February. He gathered his men and briefed them on their duties. After the Jatha had sat down, the Mahant signaled his men to carry out his plan. They closed the main gate and started firing from roof tops. 26 Singhs were killed in the courtyard while another 60 or so sitting inside the Darbar Sahib became targets. When the Mahant's men saw no one moving, they came down with swords and choppers. Any Singh they found breathing was cut to pieces. Thus 86 Jatha Singhs including Jathedar Bhai Tehal Singh and Jathedar Bhai Lachhman Singh achieved martyrdom for the glory of the Sikh Panth. On 21 February Mr King, Commissioner Lahore handed over the keys of the Gurdawara complex to Sardar Harbans Singh. Thus, the peaceful Sikhs had won a decisive battle against the Mahant.

== Fatalities ==
The number of fatalities has been variously estimated at 120, 150 or even 200. Government reports placed the deaths at 126. Police inspector Bachan Singh had the number at 156. The report by Nankana Sahib Committee published in Shaheedi Jeewan however, placed the deaths at 86 and listed the strength of the Shaheedi Jatha at 200. It seems that, besides Shaheedi Jatha Singhs, many non-participant devotees and others staying within Gurdwara also fell victims in the massacre.

== See also ==
- Saka Nankana
- Master Sundar Singh Lyallpuri

== Books and periodicals ==
- Gurdwara Reform Movement, and The Sikh Awakening, 1984, Teja Singh
- Akali, Lahore, 8 October 1920
- Akali Morchian Da Itihaas, 1977, Sohan Singh Josh
- Meri Aap Beeti, Master Sunder Singh Lyallpuri (unpublished)
- Gurdwara Arthaat Akali Lehir, 1975, Giani Pratap Singh
- Struggle for Reform in Sikh Shrines, (Ed Dr Ganda Singh)
- Khushwant Singh: A History of the Sikhs, 1966.
- Shaheedi Jeewan, 1938, Gurbaksh Singh Shamsher
- Glimpses of Sikhism and Sikhs, 1982, Sher Singh Sher
- Encyclopedia of Sikhism, Vol I, II, Harbans Singh
