= Central Sikh League =

- Abbreviation: CSL
- Leader: Gajjan Singh; Baba Kharak Singh; Tara Singh
- Founder: Sardul Singh Kavishar, Harchand Singh Lyallpuri and Sunder Singh Lyallpuri
- Founded: 29 December 1919
- Dissolved: 16 October 1933
- Merged into: Khalsa Darbar
- Ideology: Sikhism; Indian Independence

Central Sikh League was a political party of the Sikhs. It was founded in Amritsar on 19 December 1919. The First Leader/President was Sardar Bahadur Sardar Gajjan Singh.

== History ==
The main objectives and aims of the league were the attainment of Indian independence and the promotion of Khalsa Panth.

The league sought representation of the Sikh community in the Punjab Legislative Council, removal of restriction on carrying of Kirpan one of the religious symbols, and reforms of Sikh places of worship. In 1920, the League passed a resolution to support the Non-Cooperation Movement started by Mahatma Gandhi. Central Sikh League also encouraged volunteers to carry on fight for Swaraj.

The League supported the Gurdwara Reform Movement and appointed an inquiry committee into the Nankana massacre of 20 February 1921. League also protested when the keys of Darbar Sahib were taken by the British Government and again when Maharaja Ripudaman Singh of Nabha State by British Government.
