= Sandhar =

Sandhar may refer to:

- Sandhar, Orissa, a village in Anugul district, Orissa, India
- Sandhar, Punjab, a village in Hoshiarpur district, Punjab, India
- Sukhbir Sandhar, producer of Saka - The Martyrs of Nankana Sahib
- Puneet Sandhar, candidate in 41st British Columbia general election
- Sandhar Jagir, village in Punjab, India
