= Sunder Singh Lyallpuri =

Indian educator and journalist (1878 – 1969)

Sunder Singh Lyallpuri (1878 – 3 March 1969) was a leading Sikh member of the Indian independence movement, a general of the Akali Movement, an educationist, and a journalist. Lyallpuri played a key role in the development of the Shiromani Akali Dal and in the Gurdwara Reform Movement of the early 1920s. He was also a founding member of the Central Sikh League. He took part in several roles in the establishment and growth of Indian independence.

== Family history and early life ==
Sunder Singh was born in 1878 into a Kamboj farmer's family in Village Bohoru in Amritsar. His father's name was Lakhmir Singh Sandha and his mother's was Ram Kaur.

During the colonization of Bars, the Sandha family, along with many others, moved to Sheikhupura District (now in Pakistan) where they were allotted lands in the new Bar Chenab colony currently known as Faisalabad. In memoriam of their ancestral village in Amritsar, the colonists named their new settlement in Sheikhupura as Bohoru (Chak No 18 Bohoru). Sunder Singh was married in 1901 to Bibi Sant Kaur, the daughter of S. Mangal Singh of Nizampur.

== Education and early activities ==
Sunder Singh Lyallpuri received his basic education in Shahkot (Pakistan), and then obtained his B.A. (Honors), from Khalsa College Amritsar and his B.T. from Government College Lahore. Lyallpuri was invited for a personal interview for the position of tehsildar (revenue officer), but he sat in a chair in front of the Commissioner without his permission. This caused a verbal scuffle between him and the English officer, and he was sent back without being interviewed. On pressure from his relatives, he later took a position in Indian postal services, but here too he was entangled with his English boss. The senior officer called him into his office for inquiry and did not offer him a chair to sit on which again hurt the pride of Sunder Singh. Lyallpuri concluded that his self-respect would not allow him to serve the British Indian Government.

== Khalsa Youngman Association ==
Chenab colony of Lyallpur was a new colonial settlement as was Lyallpur itself. Sunder Singh made Lyallpur his land of action and henceforth was nicknamed as Lyallpuri. It was a time when the Hindu Arya Samaj movement was ruling supreme in Punjab, and the Sikh masses were coming to its fold in large numbers. To counter this phenomenon, Sunder Singh Lyallpuri started educating the Sikh masses about Sikhism and its history. In association with S. Harchand Singh Ryees and some other well-wishers, Lyallpuri founded the Khalsa Bhujangi Sabha (Khalsa Youngman Association), the members of which played a leading role in the Sikh affairs and for the country as a whole. It was this association that started the Gurdwara Rikabganj Morcha, later supported by the broad Sikh community, and won the victory for the Akalis.

== Sacha Dhandora and Anand Marriage Act ==
During this time, there was extreme illiteracy and ignorance in the Sikh community. Lyallpuri realized the urgent need to awaken and educate the community. He decided to create a weekly newspaper, the Sacha Dhandora, and began publishing patriotic songs and Sikh-ideology related nationalistic articles. In those days, Tika Sahib (Wali Ahid) Ripudaman Singh of erstwhile Nabha State, was making outstanding contributions towards Sikhism, and his views on Sikhism were routinely published in Sacha Dhandora. This brought Master Lyallpuri and Tika Sahib together. Tika Sahib was also a member of the Imperial Council from 1906 to 1908. Together they worked on the draft for Anand Marriage Act, which was later submitted to the Special Committee for review. When Tika Sahib ceased to be member of the council after 1908, Sardar Sunder Singh Majithia became a member of the Imperial Council in his place. Because of this, Majithia continued to pursue the matter and the Bill got finally enacted on 22 October 1909. The Sikh marriage called Anand Karaj was introduced from the time of the Sikh Gurus but it got statutory recognition only after the passage of the Anand Marriage Act 1909. According to the centrally approved Sikh Code (Sikh Reht Maryada), persons not professing the Sikh faith cannot be joined in wedlock by the Anand Karaj ceremony.

== Morcha for Rakabganj Wall ==
Along with S Harchand Singh, Teja Singh Samundri, S. Sardul Singh and Master Mota Singh, Master Lyallpuri played a crucial role in the Rakabganj Gurudwara Morcha through The Akali (Punjabi Daily); compelling the Government to yield. The write-ups in The Akali, published by Lyallpuri, played a very important and effective role in electrifying the Sikh community and rousing it into action for Gurdwara Rakabganj Morcha.

== Educationist ==
Sardar Harchand Singh was a good friend of Lyallpuri. Both realized the need for education among the Sikh community. So they opened first primary school in the building of Singh Sabha Lyallpura which soon was converted to Lyallpur High School. This noble action also brought several important people like Teja Singh Samundri, Master Tara Singh, S. Harchand Singh, Master Sunder Singh and Prof Niranjan Singh and Jathedar Buta Singh together who had played important roles in Sikh history. Slowly, the High School became the well-known Lyallpur Khalsa College. Other schools founded by Master Lyallpuri or which he helped in founding were: High School Chak No 41 Jhang Branch Khalsa High School Sangla Hill Sheikhupura, Khalsa High School Nwana Pind (Sheikhupura), Khalsa High School Kutia Baba Chetan Das (Sheikhupura), Khalsa High School Jai Chak (Sheikhupura), Kaumi High Schoolh Jhelum, Kaumi College Jhelum etc. Sir Sikander Hyat, the Prime Minister of undivided Punjab, Giani Kartar Singh, Mangal Singh Gill, Gopal Singh Kaumi, Sir Joginder Singh, Qazi Abdul Rehman etc., are some of the well known students of Master Lyallpuri. Some of the Kamboj and other Singhs who fell as martyrs in Saka Nankana had been students of Lyallpuri.

In several of the schools he had founded and served, he offered his services free in exchange for only two meals and a pair of personal clothes.

== Martial Law 1919 ==
After the Jallianwala Bagh Massacre of 13 April 1919, the entirety of Punjab was placed under martial law including Lyallpur. There were no untoward incidents except destruction of telephone and telegraph wires near Lyallpur Railway Station. However, a huge mass of dry husk near the station caught fire and as a result 2-3 people burnt alive. It was a coincidence that Lyallpuri was on the station at the moment. In the early morning of April 22, English police fully loaded with machine-guns laid siege to Lyallpur and arrested 12 people including Lyallpuri.

Lyallpuri was tried for charges of arson, violence and murder. Although the charges were not proved, Lyallpuri was sentenced to death by hanging. His case was taken up by famous lawyers like Pt. Moti Lal Nehru, C. R. Das and Pt. Madan Mohan Malviya. Later, under special government proclamation, the death sentence was commuted to fine and imprisonment. However, the nationalist lawyers continued to pursue the case and finally the sentence was reduced to a fine of Rs 1200 and imprisonment of 1.5 years, for which he was deported to Cellular Jail, Andaman and Nicobar Islands. The fine was paid by Lyallpuri's father by mortgaging/selling his land.

== Founder of The Akali Daily ==
After being released from jail, Lyallpuri held a meeting of his friends which included Sardar S. Harchand Singh, S. Sardul Singh Kaveeshar, Giani Hira Singh Darad, S. Mangal Singh Gill (Tehsildar), S. Pratap Singh Gujjaranwala and S. Teja Singh Samundri in the house of S. Sardul Singh Kaveeshar. Based on the decision of the meeting, Master Lyallpuri founded a Punjabi daily which was named The Akali after Baba Akali Phula Singh. The Akali daily was meant to protect the rights of Sikhs and provide a political voice for their interests. The first issue of The Akali appeared on 21 May 1920 with Lyallpuri as its Owner, Manager, Publisher and Chief Editor. He was assisted by Giani Hira Singh Darad and S Mangal Singh Gill etc. It was the first Punjabi daily to be published and in its very first issue, it had outlined in its editorial note its programme advocating: (1) Panthic control over the Gurdwaras; (2) Panthic control of Khalsa College, Amritsar; (3) repairing the demolished wall of Gurudwara Rakabganj, Delhi; (4) creation of religious and political awakening among the Sikh masses and to line them up for more effective roles in India's struggle of independence; and (5) creation of a Sikh organisation and choosing its members democratically through elections based on Panchayat rules. The writings in The Akali were so effective and bold compared to the Urdu dailies of the times that some Hindus and even Muslims had especially learnt Gurmukhi to read The Akali The paper effectively and forcefully raised the wall issue of Gurdwara Rakabganj Delhi and roused the Sikh community into dynamic action and participation. A big Shaheedi Jatha was organised but before it reached Delhi, the Government yielded to the demands of the Sikh community.

Master Lyallpuri coined the expression Na-Milvartan Lehir, for Asehyog Lehir ('Non-Cooperation Movement') proposed by Mahatma Gandhi which name got the widest acceptance and popularity in Punjab. The coining of the impressive expression like Na-Milvartan and to make it most popular in Punjab could only fall to the share of a daily like The Akali alone. Not only in Punjab, this alternative expression started to be used in whole of India and became an integral part of the vocabulary of the national struggle and history.

== Founding of Akali movement ==
After awakening and organising the Sikh community and achieving a first phase of success in the domain of religion and education, The Akali started dedicating its columns to India's freedom struggle. The paper became a unifying and organising instrument for the Akali Tehrik as well as it also became a mouthpiece of the Sikhs. The paper had realistically adopted a nationalistic approach and had also offered a powerful common front against the anti-Indian, anti-communal and pro-imperialist forces. With the untiring efforts of The Akali under Master Lyallpuri, Shiromani Committee (the religious wing) and Shiromani Akali Dal, (the religio-political wing) of the Sikh Community took birth on 15–16 November 1920 and on 14 December 1920 respectively. "The role of 'The Akali' must be regarded as the milestone in 'Akali Movement'. After the name of newspaper (i.e The Akali), the 'Gurudwara Reform Movement' also became popularly known as the 'Akali Movement'" . Master Sundar Singh Lyallpuri is regarded as the founding father of the 'Akali Movement' and the 'Shiromini Akali Dal' (i.e. the religio-political wing of the Akali party).

At the national level, the Na Milwartan Lehir (Non-Cooperation Movement) was so effectively projected in the daily The Akali that it caused a great alarm and concern among the English Government and they had to arrest Lyallpuri and later other 10-12 of its editors, one after another, within two years. Security of The Akali was also forfeited. Under section 124 'O', Master Lyallpuri was charged and sentenced to one year imprisonment in 1922 for writing and publishing provocative material.

== Akali Urdu News paper ==
After release from prison in 1923, Master Lyallpuri started Akali (Urdu) from Amritsar. The daily continued till 1929–30 with minor breaks but after 1930, it was closed due to financial reasons.

== Hindustan Times ==
Pt Madan Mohan Malayia was a very good friend of Master Lyallpuri. He had suggested to Master Lyallpuri that Akali should start one of their own English newspaper so that the Akal agenda and voice could reach every nook and corner of India. Accordingly, the 'Managing Board' of The Akali newspaper held a meeting under chairmanship of Lyallpuri and decided to found an English daily. The Board assigned the task to Master Lyallpuri and S Mangal Singh Gill. However, the move received a setback when Lyallpuri was arrested under section 124 'O' for writing what the English Government thought was objectionable material in The Akali. On release from jail, Lyallpuri resumed the efforts and put an advertisement in The Akali asking for donations for five Lakhs from Sikh Sangat. In response, the Punjabi fans of Master Lyallpuri from Stockton (USA) immediately wired Rs 150,000. Another Rs 70,000 was contributed by local Sikh community with the efforts of Lyallpuri. S Mangal Singh Gill and Chanchal Singh (Jandiala, Jullundur) were made in charge of the newspaper. Pt Madan Mohan Malaviya and Master Tara Singh were members of the Managing Committee. K. S. Panikar was its first Editor. Devdas Gandhi was also on the editor's panel. The Managing chairman and Chief Patron was Master Lyallpuri himself. The opening ceremony was performed by Mahatma Gandhi on 15 September 1924. The first issue was published from Naya Bazar, Delhi (Now: Swami Sharda Nand Marag). It was very unfortunate for the Sikhs that due to lack of experience, and jealousy and betrayal of the fellows like Master Tara Singh and S. Mangal Singh Gill, as well as due to lack of viable financial resources, the Hindustan Times soon came into severe grip of financial crisis so that its ownership had to be sold to Pt Madan Mohan Malayia. Even Pt Malayia could not keep it running for long and he sold it to G. D. Birla. The sale of the ownership of the Hindustan Times had caused a great mental anguish to Lyallpuri. Master Lylallpuri has personally written that: "S. Mangal Singh and Co. torpedoed my aim of nationalism and of Hindu-Sikh-Muslim-Christian unity. They rather gave it a communal twist, so the Akalis had to part company with Hindustan Times; and this also caused winding up of the Sikh Center at Delhi which I had established with so much fondness and hard labour." Hindustan Times which was founded by Master Sunder Singh Lyallpuri and friends and later sold out by Akalis now forms one of the most leading groups of Indian dailies and is published from several places, besides Delhi.

== Other weekly newspapers ==
Besides the dailies like The Akali and Hindustan Times, Master Lyallpuri had started several weeklies also. The important in the list are: Akali, Azad Akal (Punjabi), Azad Akali (Urdu), Melu, Nawa Yug, Daler Khalsa, Kundan, Inkalab (Urdu), Sanjhiwal, and Guru Khalsa. Each of them ran for a while and then ceased due to political or financial or both reasons.

== National leadership ==
In the wake of Hindu-Muslim riots of 1924, Mahatma Gandhi and other national leaders like Maulana Mohammad Ali and Dr M. A. Anusari called a national Ekta Samelan at Delhi in 1924 which continued for several days. It concentrated mainly on national unity, mutual trust, love and brotherhood. At the end a Central National Panchayat was constituted which was authorised to recruit further members and expand it to the grass roots. With Mahatma Gandhi as its chairman and Convener, the National Panchayat included, among others, Lala Lajpat Rai, G. K. Nariman, Master Sunder Singh Lyallpuri, Dr S. K. Datta and Hakim Ajmal Khan. In the following years, Master Lyallpuri organised or else participated in several seminars or Ekta Samelans for the promotion of mutual love, trust and brotherhood among the Hindus, Muslims, Christians, and the Sikhs. Lyallpuri also remained a member of All India Congress Committee.

Lyallpuri had also attended the Lahore Congress Session of 1929. At the proposal of Baba Kharak Singh and Lyallpuri, a resolution was included in the Congress Session asking for Complete Independence of India. Master Lyallpuri was also involved in the preparation of its wording. Some of the conservative Congress members however, had opposed this resolution but it still got passed with majority vote. Another resolution pressed forward by these Akalis was to ensure fair and equitable treatment to the minorities.

Lyallpuri had also participated in Civil Disobedience Movement and underwent three years' imprisonment.

== Legacy and death ==
Lyallpuri had lost all of his 1.5 murabba fertile land, a house and other property. When S. Paratap Singh Kairon became Chief Minister of Punjab, he allotted him 12 acres (49,000 m^{2}) of land and a sustenance pension of Rs 100 per month. Baba Gurdit Singh, the hero of the Komagata Maru incident used to address Lyallpuri as Baba Phula Singh Akali and also called him Pita ji (dear father). S. Pratap Singh Kairon addressed him as Chacha Ji and used such a vocabulary for him which put him at par with our Gurus.

Lyallpuri died on 3 March 1969.

== Books and periodicals ==
- Akali Lehir Da Sanchalik, Master Sunder Singh Lyallpuri, S Kirpal Singh.
- Merian Kujh Itihaasak Yaadana, Singh Darad.
- Akali Morchian Da Itihaas, S Sohan Singh Josh.
- Meri Aap Beeti, Master Sunder Singh Lyallpuri (unpublished draft).
- Witness to an era, The Tribune, 12 Sep 1982, M. D. Vazirudin .
- Encyclopedia of Sikhism, Vol III, S Harbans Singh.
- Gurdwara Reform Movement, and The Sikh Awakening, 1984, Teja Singh.
- Akali, Lahore, 8 October 1920.
- Akali Morchian Da Itihaas, 1977, Sohan Singh Josh.
- Meri Aap Beeti, Master Sunder Singh Lyalpuri (unpublished).
- Amritsar De Jhujhar Yodhe, 1984, Ram Singh Majitha.
- Teja Singh Samundari, by Dr Piar Singh.
- Autobiography, Dr Rajendra Prasad.
- Phulwari. Lahore, VI, No 2,3.
- Phulwari Da Sikh Itihaas No, December 1929-January 1930.
- Shiromini Committee da Janam te Usde Pradhan, Kaumi Ekta, June 1975, Sohan Singh Josh.
