= Sikhwala =

Sikhwala Sikh Wala
- Rural
- Location in Punjab, India Sikhwala (India)
- Coordinates: 30.02844693°N 74.530445°E
- Country: India
- State: Punjab
- District: Sri Muktsar Sahib

Government
  - Sarpanch: Mr. Parkash Singh Badal (Lambi assembly constituency)
- Postal code: 152113

Sikhwala is a village in the Malout Tehsil of Sri Muktsar Sahib district in Punjab, India.

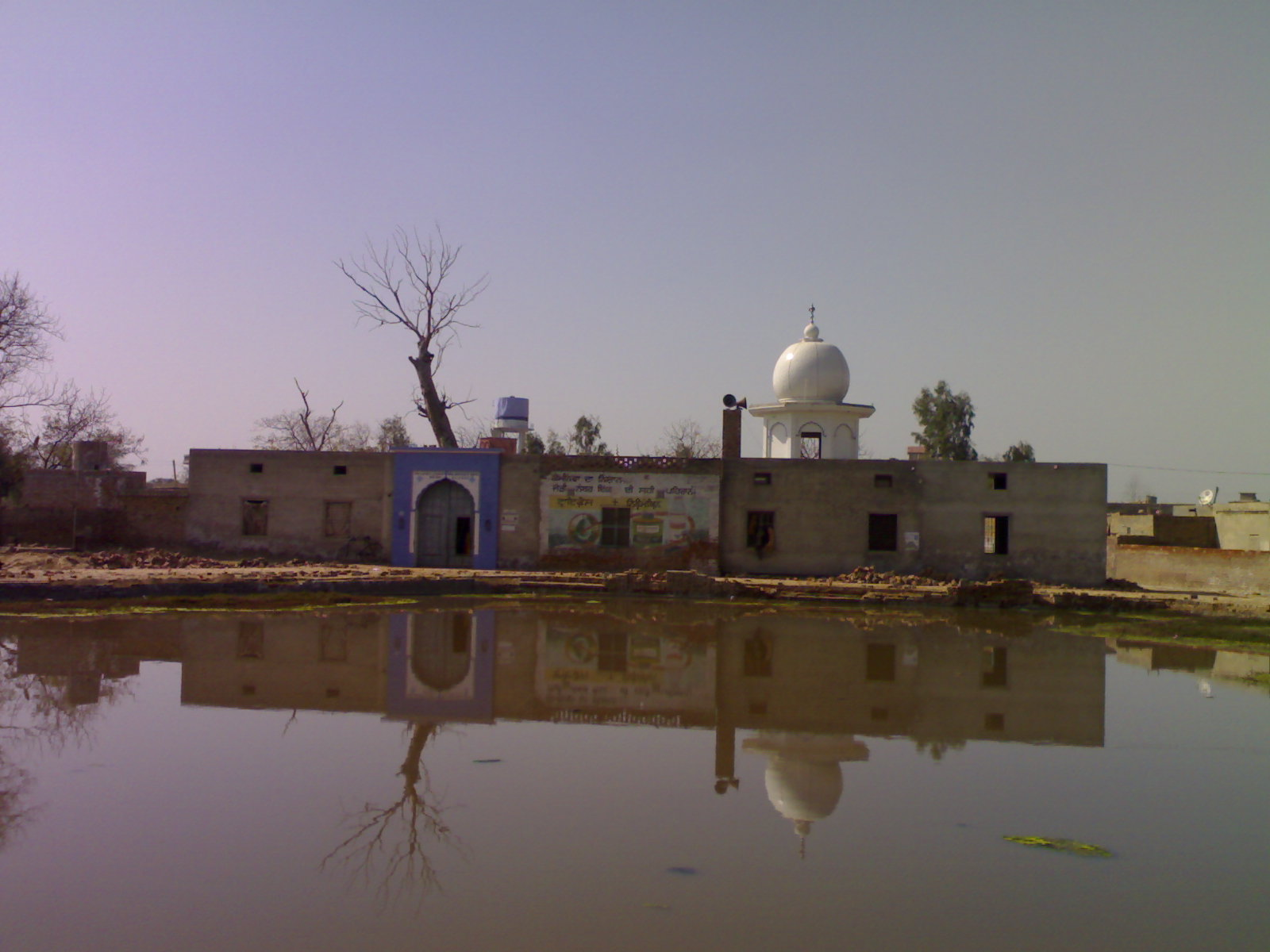
Dera and its reflection in the pond at Sikhwala, where Gurugranth Sahib has been installed with due respect.

It is located in the southern part of Mukatsar district, on the Lambi-Sangariya and Lambi Khubban roads, 290 kilometres (180 mi) from the state capital, Chandigarh, and 346 km (215 mi) from the national capital, New Delhi. Sikhwala is 27 km (17 mi) from Malout and 25 km from Mandi Dabwali. The village has a population of 4,425, with males numbering 2,342 and females numbering 2,083, according to the 2011 population census.

== Geography and climate ==
The soil of Sikhwala is fertile. The 'Lambi Distributary' canal runs on the west side of the village, between Sikhwala and Fatuhikhera village. There are six ponds (chhapar in Punjabi) in the village.

== History ==
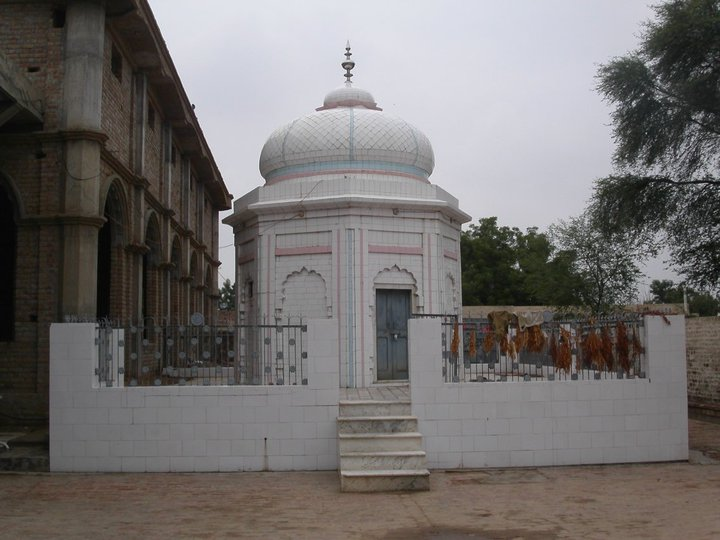
Samadhi of Baba Kharak Singh is located in Gurdwara complex.

Sikhs were always in majority. Families of the Ramgarhia clan began to live in Sikhwala.

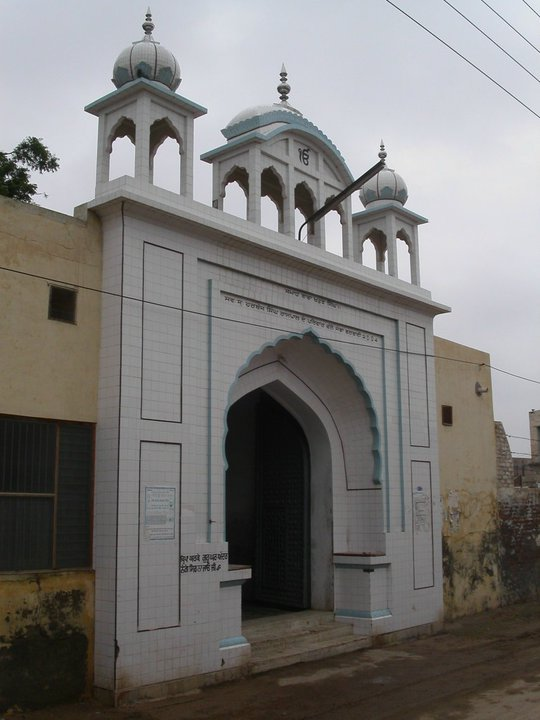
Entrance gate of Gurudwara.

Baba Kharak Singh has an important place in the history of this village. Sant Anant Prakash used to live in a Dera. He belonged to the Udasin tradition of saints and lived a simple life. He was a revered man among the people. In Dera, Sri Gurugranth Sahib is read with traditional devotion.

== Governance ==
Sikhwala has a gram panchayat status. Mr. Harpinder Singh is Sarpanch of the village. SAD, INC., are the major political parties in this area. The Assembly constituency of this area consists of the Lambi assembly constituency, and the Assembly MLA for 2017 was Mr. Parkash Singh Badal. The Lok Sabha constituency of this area is the Bathinda parliamentary constituency. The Parliament MP of Sikhwala in 2017 was Mr. Harsimrat Kaur Badal.

== Culture ==
Sikhism is the religion practiced by a majority of the population. The Ramgarhia people are the majority in the village. Rajpal, Matharu, Lote, Kalsi, Bamrah, Marwa, Chana are main gotras of these Ramgarhia people in Sikhwala.Christian, Jattsikh, Arora, Bania, Ravidasia, Mazhabi are other castes here. Punjabi is the main language; however, a dialect of Rajasthani language called "Bagri" is also spoken by some in the village. Men wear Kurta, Pjamah, Chaadara pants and shirts. Women wear Punjabi suits. Some changes in the culture have been seen in the last few decades. For example, women have almost completely left the custom of spinning textile fibers on the Charkha, and the festival Teeyan (Tiyaan), which focuses on daughters and sisters, is no longer held.

Homes are equipped with modern electronic appliances. Dth and FM radio have changed the mode of entertainment. Kothis or English bungalows are taking the place of old havelis.

Although Sikhism is the major religion practiced in the region, Hinduism is also practiced by some of the population. In the eastern part of Sikhwala, Christians are a minority group.

== Schools and colleges ==
Government Sec., Govt. Senior Secondary School and Govt. Elementary School fulfills education requirements. An English school named Alphonsa Convent School is run by Christian missionaries. A university college has been established on the Sikhwala-Bhitiwala Road.

== Sports ==
Cricket, Kabbadi, and volleyball are very popular sports practiced in Sikhwala.

== Transport ==
Malout and Mandi Dabwali are the closest cities (both about 27–22 km), and there is clear road from sikhwala
