= Akali movement =

Former campaign within Sikhism

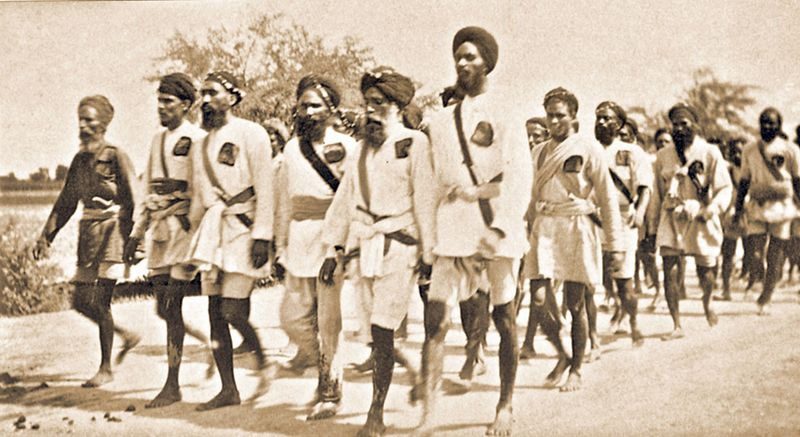
- Jatha of Akali volunteers marching to Guru-ka-Bagh on 25 October 1922 during the movement
- Date: 1920–1925
- Location: Punjab (British India)
- Goals: Transferring control of Sikh gurdwaras from traditional clergy (Udasi mahants) and Government-appointed managers to elected Sikh bodies
- Methods: Nonviolent resistance including demonstrations and petitions
- Result: Sikh Gurdwara Bill (1925) places historical Sikh shrines in India under the control of Shiromani Gurdwara Parbandhak Committee

Parties
Singh Sabha; Shiromani Gurdwara Parbandhak Committee; Akali Dal	Udasis, mahants, and pujaris	British Raj

Lead figures
Kartar Singh Jhabbar; Sunder Singh Lyallpuri; Tehal Singh Dhanju; Buta Singh Lyallpuri	Narain Das	(British Raj) Governor of Punjab

Number
>30,000 courted arrest		

Casualties and losses
400 killed, >2000 injured		

The Akali movement (IPA: /əˈkɑːli/; known in Punjabi as the Ākali Morcha), also called the Gurdwara Reform Movement, was a set of campaigns to bring reform in the gurdwaras (the Sikh places of worship) in India during the early 1920s. The movement led to the introduction of the Sikh Gurdwara Bill in 1925, which placed all the historical Sikh shrines in India under the control of Shiromani Gurdwara Parbandhak Committee (SGPC).

The Akalis also participated in the Indian independence movement against the British Government, and supported the non-cooperation movement against them.

== Formation ==
Sikh leaders of the Singh Sabha in a general meeting in Lahore in March 1919 formed the Central Sikh League in March 1919, which was formally inaugurated in December of that year. In its periodical, the Akali, it listed among its objectives the goals of bringing back control of the Khalsa College, Amritsar under the control of representatives of the Sikh community (accomplished in November 1920 by negating government control through refusing government grants), liberating gurdwaras from mahant control, and encouraging Sikhs to participate in the independence movement, lending support to the non-cooperation movement in October 1919.

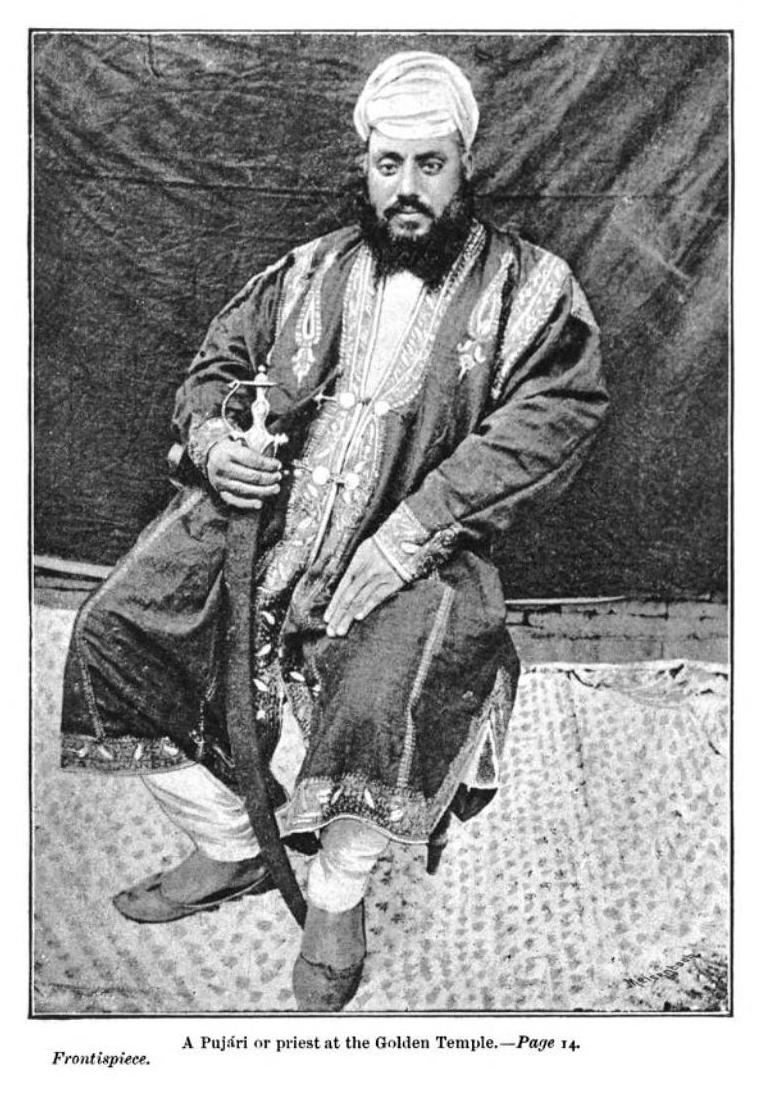
Seated photograph of a pujari or priest at the Golden Temple complex in Amritsar, Punjab

The Central Sikh League demanded the administration of the Golden Temple to be transferred from the government to an elected representative body of Sikhs answerable to the panth, and in October 1920 took control of the Golden Temple and Akal Takht. The Jallianwala Bagh massacre in April 1919 during the course of the national independence movement, subsequent words of support from Arur Singh Shergill, the head priest of the Golden Temple, to General Dyer, and the general disturbances in Punjab in 1919 provoked an outcry among Singh Sabha circles, and increased Sikh urgency to reclaim control of the gurdwaras.

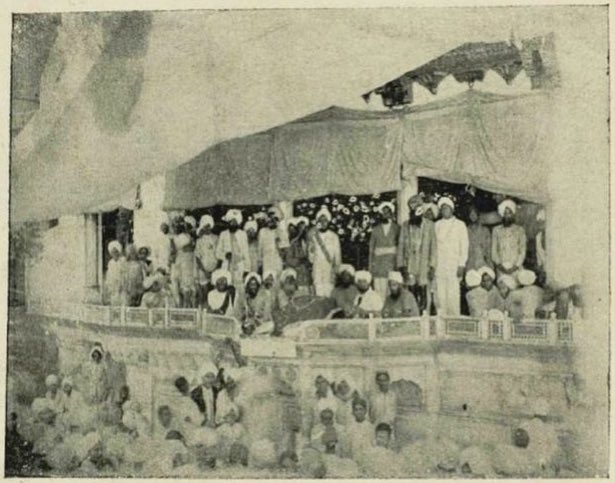
Photograph of the Khalsa Biradari Society occupying the premises of the Akal Takht after purging the Pujari caretakers, marking the beginning of the Akali movement, 12 October 1920

To pacify these sentiments, the colonial Punjab Government appointed a provisional committee of 36 members, entirely from Sikh landed aristocrat families, to formulate proposals regarding the operation of the Golden Temple. Following the Central Sikh League's disapproval of the committee's composition, expressed in a large gathering at the Golden Temple on 16 November 1920 attended by over 10,000 Sikhs, the committee in charge of the Golden Temple was reformulated with 175 members to form a managing committee for all gurdwaras. The government, publicly pursuing a policy of neutral non-interference though still managing to have some appointees on the committee, allowed the new committee, and in December 1920 the committee was named the Shiromani Gurdwara Prabandhak Committee, or SGPC, which coordinated the activities of Akali jathas, or volunteer groups, to liberate all gurdwaras from the corrupt mahants.

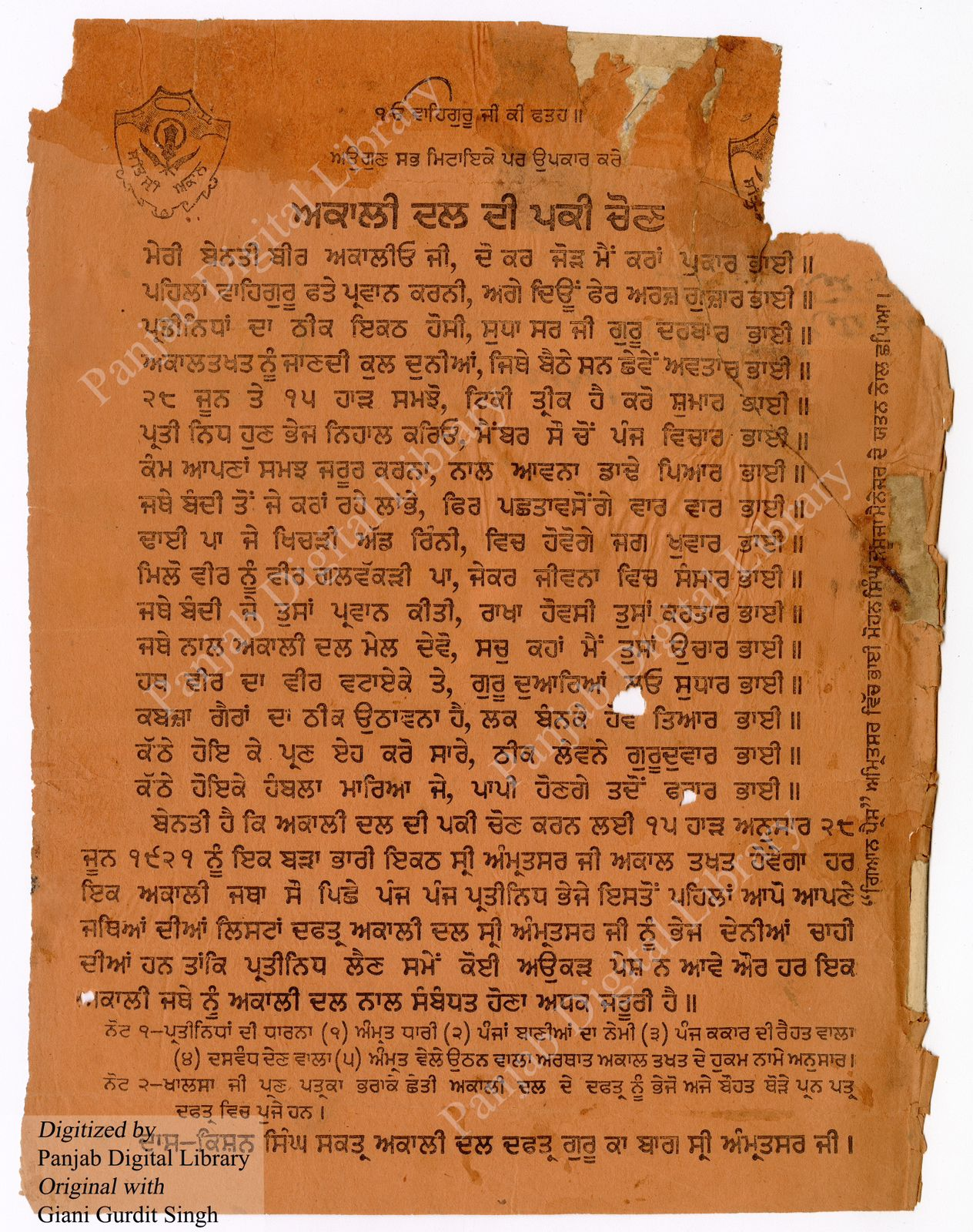
Poster released in 1921 by the Secretary Akali Dal, appealing to all Akali factions to unite or face extinction, Amritsar, circa June 1921. Digitized by the Panjab Digital Library.

The Akali movement was started in 1920 by the Central Sikh League's political wing, the Akali Dal, which was founded in Amritsar in December 1920 and assisted the SGPC. The term Akali derives from the word Akal ("timeless" or "immortal") used in the Sikh scriptures. The movement was named for the Akalis, a Khalsa militant order from the time of Guru Gobind Singh which had risen to prominence under Akali Phula Singh, one of the commanders of the Sikh Empire.

== Initial agitations ==
By the early 20th century, a number of Sikh gurdwaras in British India were under the control of the Udasi mahants (clergymen) or managers appointed by the Governors. The Udasis had come to control Sikh shrines in the eighteenth century during the period of increased persecution of the Khalsa by the Mughal Empire during that time forced them to yield control of Sikh institutions to those without external identifiers; the Khalsa would subsequently focus on political power resulting in the Sikh Empire. The main aim of the Akali movement was to have the Sikh gurdwaras released from the control of the traditional clergy, which had become powerful and ritualized.

The non-violent movement began in 1920, with the jathas, led by Kartar Singh Jhabbar, playing a major role. The first shrine chosen for reform was the Babe di Ber gurdwara in Sialkot. It was under the control of the widow of the mahant Harnam Singh. She initially resisted the takeover of the gurdwara by the Akalis, as it was her only source of income, but relented after she was offered a pension. The control of the gurdwara was then transferred to an elected committee headed by Baba Kharak Singh. However, Tarunjit Singh Butalia claims that the first Sikh shrine released from mahant control during the movement was Gurdwara Chumalla Patshahi Chhevin in Lahore, which is no longer extant.

The next major target of the Akalis was the Harmandir Sahib (Golden Temple), the holiest shrine of the Sikhs. The priest of the Golden Temple had refused to allow low-caste Hindu converts to offer prayers in the shrine. Kartar Singh Jhabbar walked to the Akal Takht in the temple premises, urging the Sikhs to give up the caste-based restrictions and reform the gurdwaras. On 28 June 1920, the Golden Temple came under the control of an elected committee called Shiromani Gurdwara Parbandhak Committee (SGPC).

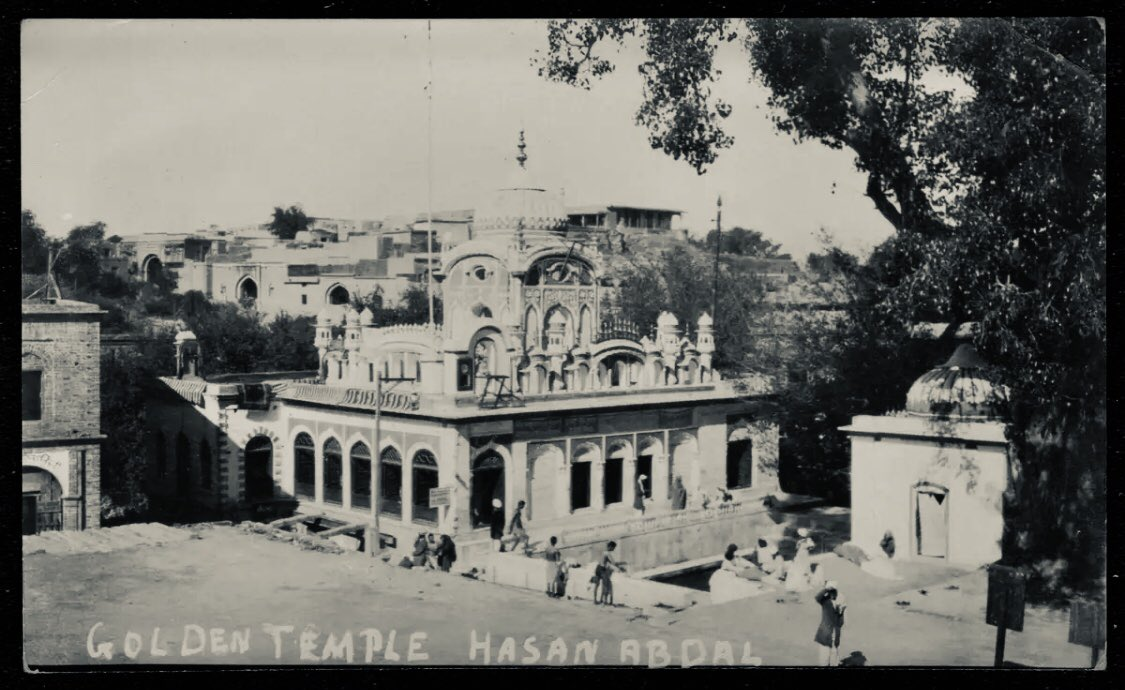
Gurdwara Panja Sahib at Hasan Abdal, ca.1920

Next, the Akalis headed to Hasan Abdal, where Gurdwara Panja Sahib was under the control of Mahant Mitha Singh. Singh allowed sale of cigarettes inside the gurdwara, and was disliked by the Sikhs. The Akalis led by Kartar Singh Jhabbar took control of the gurdwara on 20 November 1920. However, the local Hindus, who also frequented the gurdwara for worship, opposed this takeover. Around 5–6 thousand of them surrounded the gurdwara on the night of the Akali takeover, but were dispersed by the police. Nevertheless, the gurdwara was later successfully brought under the authority of the SGPC.

The Akalis then took control of the Gurdwara Sacha Sauda at Chuhar Kana (in present-day Pakistan). They then turned their attention to the Gurdwara Sri Tarn Taran Sahib, whose clergymen were accused of allowing dancing girls, smoking and drinking inside the shrine's premises. The clergymen were also accused of spreading the teachings of Arya Samaj, a Hindu reform movement some of whose leaders had criticized Sikhism. A group of 40 Akalis, led by Kartar Singh, arrived at the gurdwara on 25 January 1921, performed ardas (Sikh prayer) and declared that the gurdwara was now under their control. Henchmen employed by the mahants attacked the Akalis with crude bombs and bricks while the latter were sleeping. Two Akalis were killed and several wounded, and a jatha two weeks prior had also been beaten. The next day, the Sikhs from the surrounding villages took control of the Gurdwara, and a managing committee appointed by the SGPC. Following this, the Akalis led by Kartar Singh then took control of five more gurdwaras, including the Gurdwara Guru ka Bagh near Amritsar. The British, believing that gurdwara control could be contested in court, did not like the control of gurdwaras passing under the control of committees appointed by the SGPC.

== Nankana massacre ==
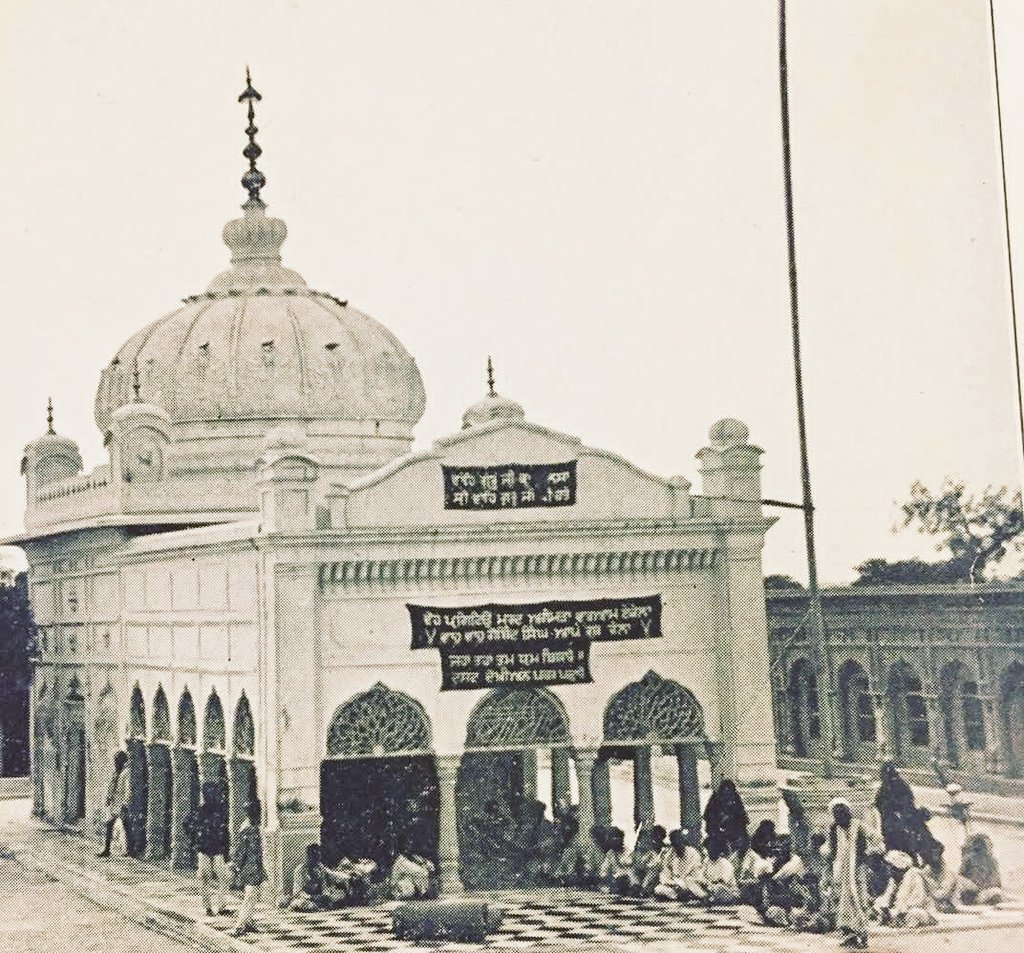
Gurdwara Janam Asthan at Nankana Sahib, ca.1922

In 1921, the Akalis turned their focus to the gurdwara at Nankana Sahib, the birthplace of the first Sikh Guru Nanak. The gurdwara was under the control of a mahant called Narain Das, who was accused of allowing immoral activities in the temple premises, including licentiousness and the misappropriation of gurdwara funds. One of the clergymen at the gurdwara had allegedly raped the 13-year-old daughter of a Hindu devotee from Sindh. The mahant's conduct had been widely condemned by the local congregation, though the large revenue from the gurdwara estates insulated him from public pressure. With the movement gaining momentum, public meetings passed resolutions condemning his conduct, and worried about being ousted by the Akalis, he turned to the government for help. When the government did not respond, Narain Das made his own arrangements, preemptively fortifying the premises and hiring approximately 80 mercenaries.

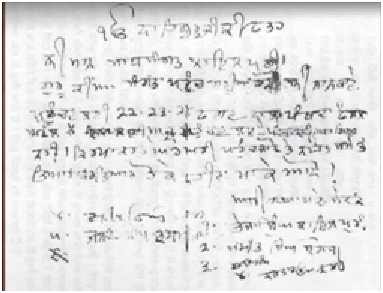
Written message to Sikhs of Lyallpur district by Teja Singh Samundri requesting them to reach Nankana Sahib, ca.1921

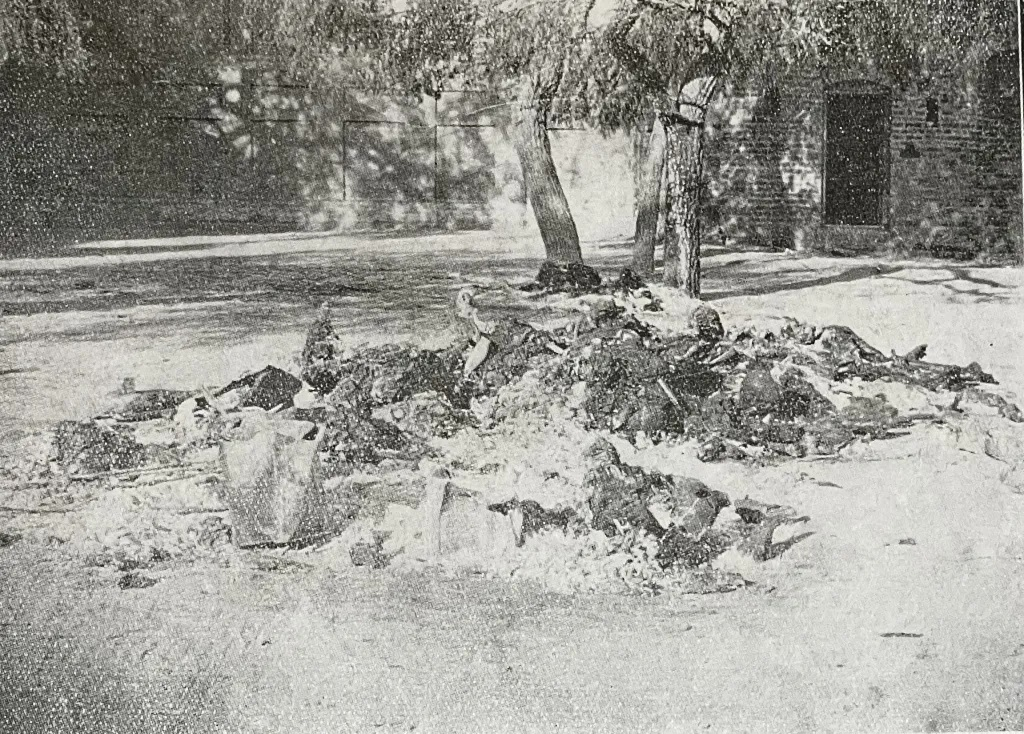
Photograph of the charred remains of Sikh victims of the Saka Nankana massacre of Feb. 20th, 1921

When a jatha of over 100 Sikh made an unscheduled trip to Nankana on 20 February 1921 without any intention yet of taking it, the Pashtun guards of the Mahant opened fire without warning, killing 130 people in what came to be known as the Nankana massacre. Visitors attempting to seek refuge in the gurdwara were chased and killed, and piles of dead and wounded were lit on fire to attempt to destroy evidence of the massacre.

=== Reaction ===
Two days later, Mahatma Gandhi and the Governor of the Punjab province visited the site, accompanied by a number of Sikh and Hindu leaders. Gandhi sympathized with the Sikhs and said that the Mahant had "out-Dyered Dyer." The attending politicians utilized widespread anti-government feelings to exhort the Sikhs to join the national noncooperation movement, which was supported by a resolution passed by the SGPC in May 1921 appealing to Sikhs to begin civil disobedience. As the Sikh reformers were now aligned with the national movement, colonial administrators began to rethink its position on non-interference in gurdwara management and acceptance of the increasing control of the SGPC.

Akalis headed to Nankana upon hearing the news in the thousands, and access to the gurdwara was restricted by the government, though eventually conceded. The British Government, finding itself under immense political pressure, agreed to transfer the control of the gurdwara to the Akalis on 3 March 1921. Narain Das and 26 of his henchmen were arrested.

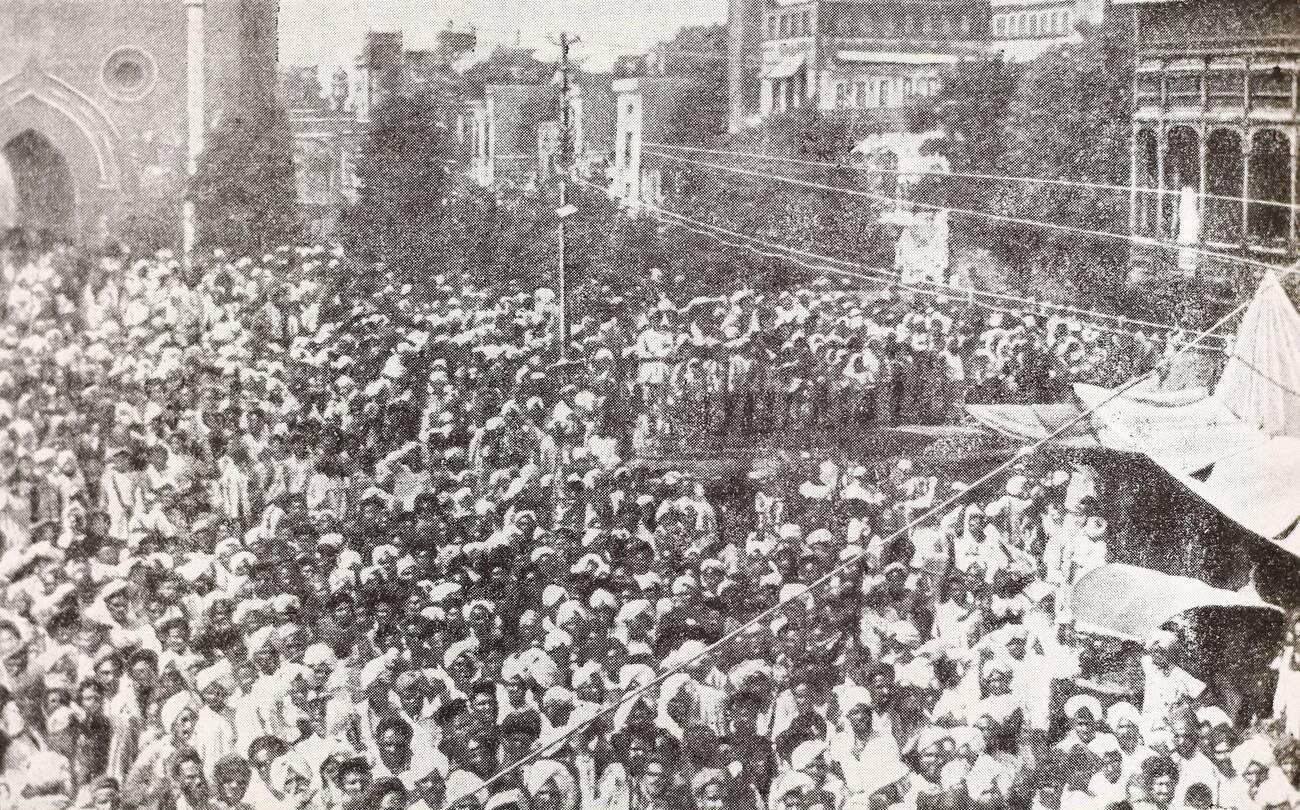
Photograph of a Sikh crowd during the Akali movement, ca.1921–1922

A section of Akalis rejected the peaceful methods adopted by SGPC, and formed the breakaway Babbar Akali movement to seize the control of the gurdwaras using violent methods. Some Akalis and Ghadarites would react against the killing of the Nankana massacre, attempting assassinations against officials held responsible for the killings, as well as their native supporters. Arrests of the militant leaders would follow, but the Babbar Akali Jatha, founded in August 1922 with the aim of defending the faith and political independence, would make overtures to ex-soldiers and the Akali reformers, as well as to Hindus and Muslims who opposed the authorities. They issued 15 issues of the Babbar Akali Doaba from a moving press throughout Jalandhar and Hoshiarpur from August 1922 to May 1923, and in 1923 committed a series of political assassinations; they were declared unlawful in August 1923 and in under a year most Babbar Akali leaders would be arrested or killed. Those arrested would be tried in 1925 and considered to be fighting for independence and Sikh rule, with six hangings in February 1926. Several organizations, including the Central Sikh League, would issued appeals to raise funds for the families of those killed and hanged, and they would be celebrated in poetry and literature.

== Resistance movements ==
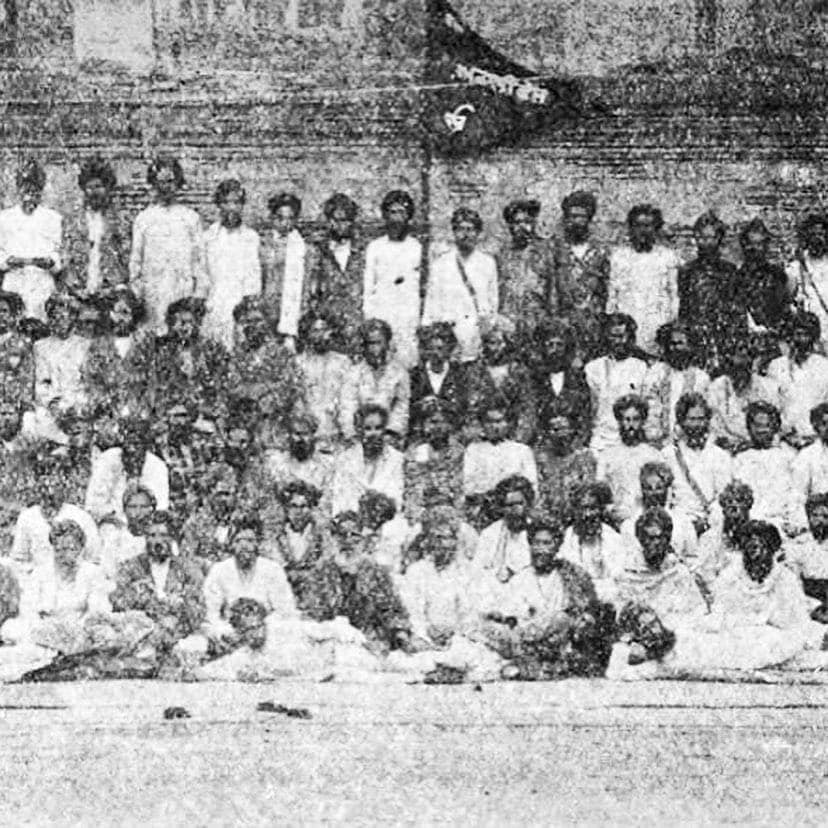
Photograph of a Sikh Jatha during the Akali movement, ca.1920's

Amid the ongoing agitations, the SGPC urged the British Government to release the protestors and legalize its control of the gurdwaras. On 1 May 1921, the influential Sikh leaders passed a resolution for launching a passive resistance movement. The next day, a Sikh-Hindu conference was organized during the Punjab Congress Provincial Congress at Rawalpindi. The Jagat Guru Shankaracharya urged the Hindus to join the Sikhs in the struggle for taking control of the gurdwaras from mahants with personal interests. On 11 May, a number of Akali jathas were asked to proceed to designated gurdwaras to take over their control.

=== Morcha Chabian ("Keys Campaign") ===
In October 1921, the SGPC executive committee passed a resolution asking Sunder Singh Ramgharia, a mahant previously appointed by the government who subsequently assumed a position as an SGPC secretary, to relinquish the keys of the Golden Temple's toshakhana, or vault, to the committee, as he represented government control over the temple's treasures and artifacts. The government would take possession of the keys in November, when Sunder Singh would seek the advice of the Deputy Commissioner, who sent his subordinate Lala Amar Nath to take the keys. which prompted the SGPC to accuse the government of meddling in Sikh affairs, and appeal to Akali jathas to meet at Amritsar and organize protest meetings. The government would in response affix their own locks to the toshakhana in defiance, escalating the situation, and Akali protestors were arrested and given punishments.

The conflict between the Sikhs and the government also lead to the consolidation of ties between the Akalis and noncooperation leaders, and the allegations of government interference in religious affairs began to affect the public opinion of Sikh soldiers, disbanded soldiers, and peasantry, on which colonial stability depended, and the threat of a major civil disobedience at the beginning of 1922. To prevent unrest, the government relented, handing over the toshakhana keys to the Baba Kharak Singh of the SGPC on 17 January 1922, and agreed to the unconditional release of all Sikhs arrested, the number of whom had been increasing up to that point. As Sikh concerns were now linked with the wider non-cooperation movement, Gandhi would telegraph the SGPC in January 1922 with "Congratulations, first decisive battle for India's freedom won." The government's attitude toward the Akalis would grow more contentious by midyear however, as the Akalis would begin to consider independence as their best option.

=== Guru-ka-Bagh ===
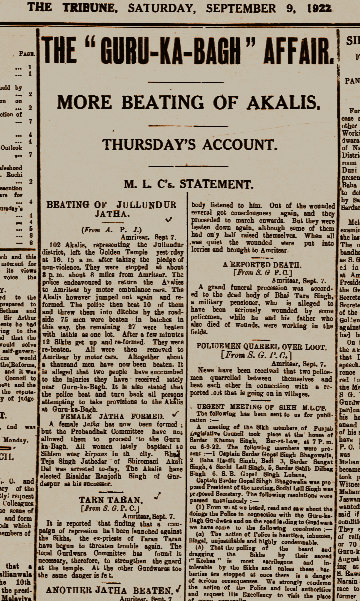
The Tribune newspaper article reporting on the events of the Guru-Ka-Bagh Morcha (Guru-Ka-Bagh movement) on 9 September 1922

The most notable conflict between the Akalis and the colonial government, highlighting the larger problem of private resource management of gurdwaras, occurred in August 1922 at the Guru-ka-Bagh ("garden of the guru") shrine 12 miles from Amritsar near Ajnala, built to mark a visit from Guru Arjan. The struggle between the Akalis and the mahant Sunder Das over the control of the site had resulted in the mahant keeping his position, though as part of a managing committee that would supervise him, similar to the toshakhana arrangement. However, in March 1921, the mahant reneged on the agreement, forcibly occupying the committee's office and destroying its records. A year later in August 1922, Akali volunteers chopped wood on land to fuel the fires of the gurdwara's free community kitchen, for which the mahant had them arrested for theft at the encouragement of the authorities, provoking a major struggle with the Akalis, who contended that the mahant could not claim private possession of the property, as it belonged to the Sikh panth, or congregation.

The Akalis warned the government that denying Sikhs the right to gather fuel for the community kitchen was to deliberately undermine their faith, and the arrests drew more Akali volunteers to the site, with the SGPC launching a campaign to send non-violent Akali jathas to the gurdwara daily. Over 200 volunteers were arrested by August 25, and by October 19 over 2,450 would be arrested by authorities. As continuous waves of Akalis kept arriving, the authorities began to use violent methods, being declared an unlawful assembly, as bands of 50 to 100, and sometimes over 200 Akalis would take blows in non-violent resistance. On October 25, a jatha of retired soldiers reached the site, which was deemed by the government to be potentially destabilizing.

National Non-cooperation leaders rallied to the cause by making speeches at the site, though support from Congress would wane after Gandhi's release in February 1924 as he wanted to separate the political issue of independence from religion. Christian missionary C.F. Andrews, visiting the site in September 1922, was shocked at the administration's brutality, describing Akali tactics as "a new lesson in moral warfare." He protested to Edward MacLagan, the Lieutenant-Governor of Punjab, and the conflict was settled by having the mahant sell the land to Sir Ganga Ram, a private Hindu philanthropist, who handed it over to the Akalis on 17 November 1922. Over 5,000 volunteers were released in March 1923.

=== Gurdwara Bill ===
The Government meanwhile launched a "Gurdwara Bill" to facilitate the settlement of the gurdwara disputes. The Bill provided setting up a Board of Commissioners for the management of the gurdwaras. However, the SGPC objected to the Government's right to appoint the Board members, and the bill was postponed. In On 17 November 1922, the "Sikh Gurdwaras and Shrines Bill" was introduced in the Punjab Legislative Assembly. All the Sikh and the Hindu members opposed the bill, but it was passed by 41 votes to 31 votes.

== Jaito and Bhai Pheru agitations ==
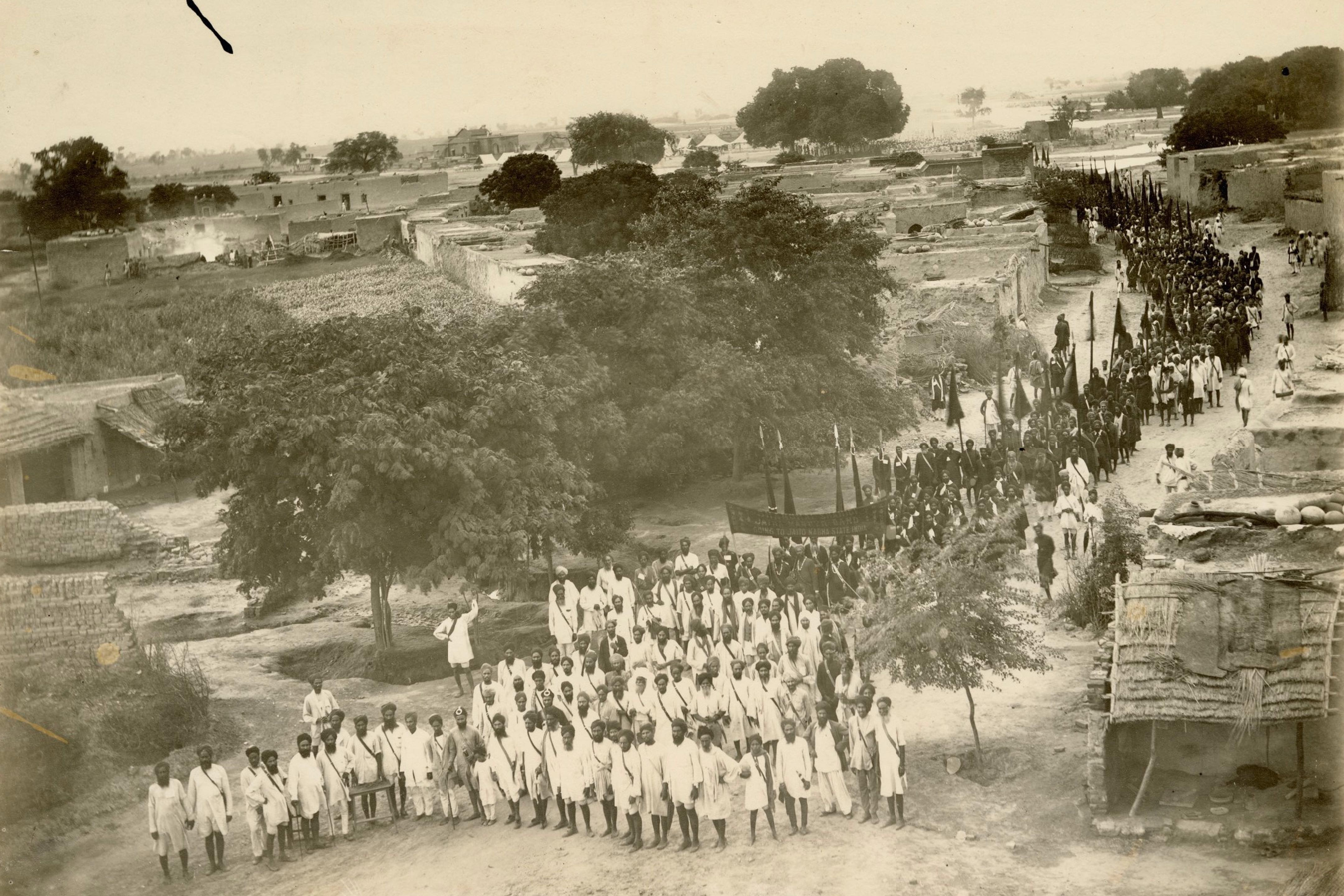
Shahidi Jatha ('Band of Martyrs') from Shanghai involved in the Jaito Morcha (agitation) marching through a village, July–August 1925

In 1923, the Akalis made plans to bring under their control Gurdwara Gangsar at Jaitu (or Jaito) in the Nabha State. The erstwhile Maharaja (ruler) of Nabha Ripudaman Singh had been sympathetic to the Akali and the Indian nationalist cause, but was deposed by the British Government, made to abdicate to his minor son on 9 July 1923. The SGPC held protest meetings, and on 4 August resolved to take up the cause, condemning the act in a meeting at Jaito on 25 August. When the SGPC launched an agitation, its leaders and members were arrested on the charge of sedition. Subsequently, several marches were organized in support of the agitation. The protesters were arrested, beaten and shot at by the police at various instances.

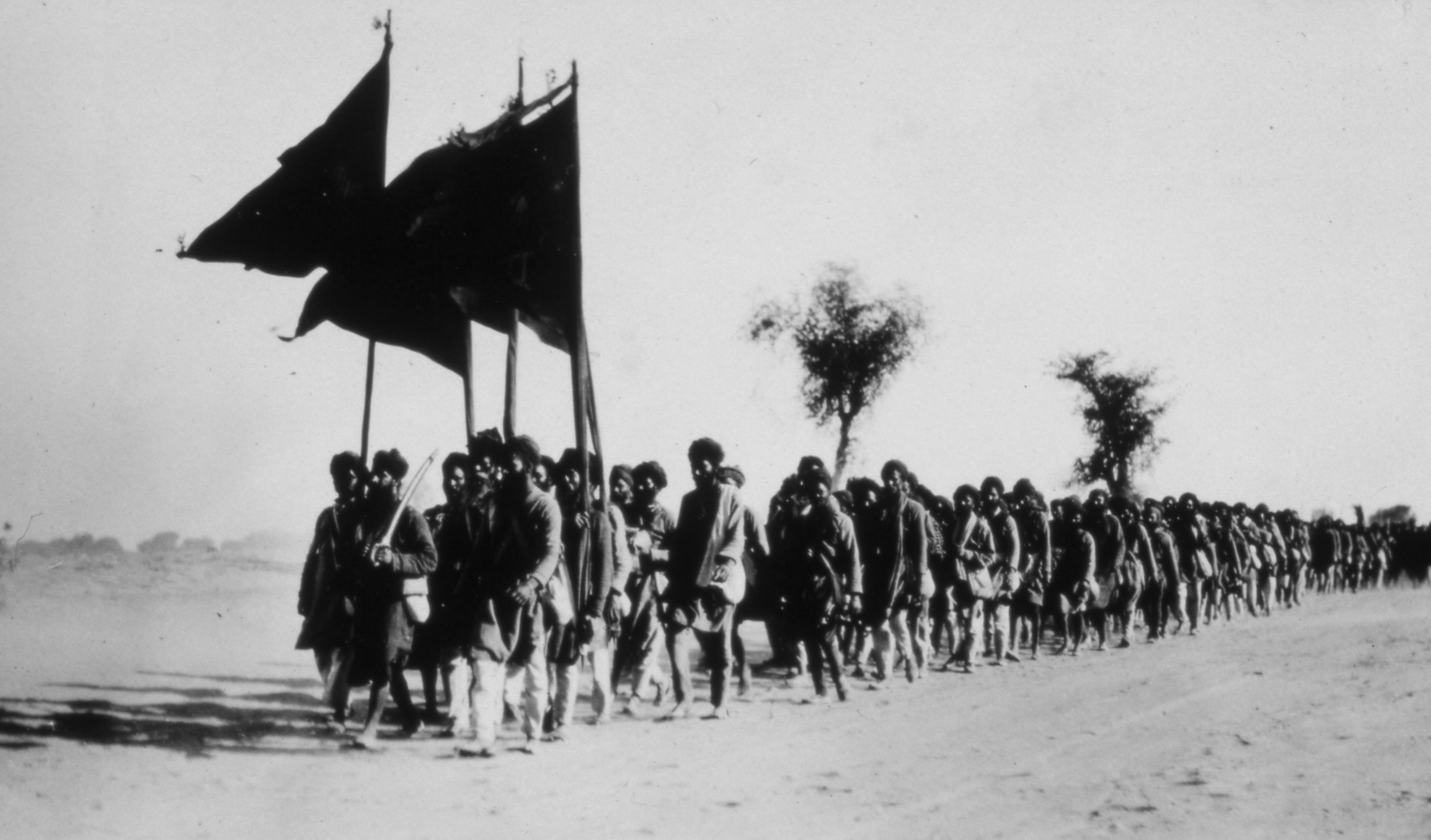
Photograph of a Shahidi Jatha procession at Jaito, circa February 1924

With the disruption of a subsequent Akhand Path ceremony, the SGPC condemned the act and resolved to fight for the Sikh right of free worship, sending jathas from the Akal Takht to Jaito to complete the ceremony. The SGPC and Akali Dal were declared to be unlawful organizations on 12 October 1923, with the 60 members of the Jaito Morcha committee arrested for treason against the Crown, though the members were replaced and the morcha continued. A jatha of 500 Akalis, seen off from Amritsar by a crowd of 30,000, was sent to mark the third anniversary of the Nankana massacre, and was fired upon by on the command of British administrators in Nabha, with about 300 injured, resulting in about 100 deaths. Jathas continued to Jaito until 101 akhand paths were completed on 6 August 1925, establishing the right to free worship.

The Indian National Congress declared its support for the Akali agitation in at the special Congress Session in Delhi. The Akalis were then joined by several non-Sikhs, including Jawaharlal Nehru (later the first Prime Minister of India) and Kasturiranga Santhanam. Nehru and others were arrested during one such march. Finally, the Government of Punjab relented and agreed to transfer the control of the gurdwara to the Akalis.

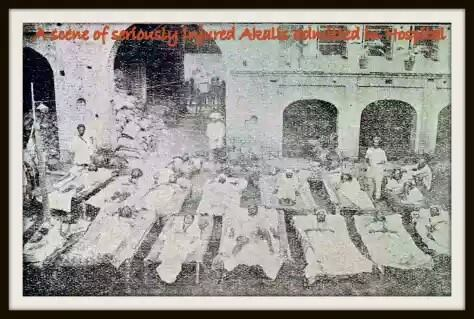
Sikh casualties admitted to hospital during the Akali movement (Gurdwara reform movement) of the early 1920s

While the Jaitu agitation was on, the Akalis also sought the control of the gurdwara at Bhai Pheru. The gurdwara was controlled by Udasi mahants including Pala Ram, the brother of Narain Das (who was responsible for the Nankana massacre). The mahant agreed to transfer the control of the gurdwara to SGPC, after being offered a pension. However, in August 1923, when the Akalis decided to eject the Udasi tenants housed in the gurdwara premises, they faced considerable resistance. On 4 December 1923, a group of Akalis damaged a mahant's residence attached to the shrine. The police arrested 11 Akalis following a complaint. In December, the Government recognized the SGPC as the manager of the gurdwara, but also ordered the Akalis to follow the legal process for ejecting the Udasi mahants out of the premises. On 1 January 1924, an Akali jatha forcibly took the possession of the property occupied by Pala Ram. Around 34 Akalis were arrested by the police for this action on the next day. In subsequent days, a number of Akali jathas staged demonstrations at the site. A total of 5,251 persons were arrested for the demonstrations, and 3,092 of these were sent to the prison.

== Sikh Gurdwara Bill ==
The British Government considered the Akali movement to be a greater threat than Mahatma Gandhi's civil disobedience movement. A 1921 memorandum signed by D. Petrie, the Assistant Director of CID, Punjab states:

Gandhi's propaganda makes its appeal mainly to the urban classes, which lack both the stamina and physical courage to oppose successfully even small bodies of police; the Akali campaign is essentially a rural movement, and its followers are men of fine physique with a national history of which the martial characteristics have been purposely kept alive both by Government and by the Sikhs themselves.

— D. Petrie, Secret CID Memorandum on Recent Developments in Sikh Politics (11 August 1921)

In 1925, after further demands and protests from SGPC, a new "Sikh Gurdwara Bill" was introduced in the Punjab Legislative Assembly on 7 May and adopted in July. It came into force on 1 November 1925, and awarded the control of all the historical shrines to SGPC. A tribunal was set up to judge the disputes, and all the Akali prisoners were released.

By this time, an estimated 30,000 people had been arrested by the British Government; over 400 had been killed and another 2,000 had been injured during the movement. The movement fueled the anti-British Government feeling among the Sikhs. It also led to an anti-Hindu sentiment among a section of Sikhs, who identified the pro-Udasi mahants such as Narain Das and their supporters with the Hindu community.

As the British authorities came to see the Akali movement to be a movement to overthrow the British and therefore to be suppressed, in addition to the casualties and arrests, there had been confiscation of properties and jagirs, fines, courts-martial for wearing the kirpan, or Sikh dagger, and black turbans traditionally signalling revolt, and penalties against publishers, editors, and presses supportive of the movement. The movement found support from almost all sections of the Sikh community, especially the peasantry, artisans, laborers, ex-soldiers, and emigrants returning from abroad.
