= Kartar Singh Jhabbar =

Sikh preacher (1874–1962)

- Born: 1874; Jhabbar village, Sheikhupura District, Punjab (British India)
- Died: 20 November 1962 (aged 87–88); Habri, Karnal, Punjab (India)
- Other name: Kartar Singh Virk
- Education: Khalsa Updeshak Mahavidyalaya
- Occupation: Religious preacher
- Known for: key figure in the Akali movement
- Parent: Teja Singh

Kartar Singh Jhabbar (September 1874 – 20 November 1962) was a Sikh leader known for his role in the Gurdwara Reform Movement of the 1920s. He is remembered for his campaign that successfully led to the establishment of the Shiromani Gurdwara Parbandhak Committee in 1920. Jhabbar was a toponym used as his alias.

== Family background and early life ==
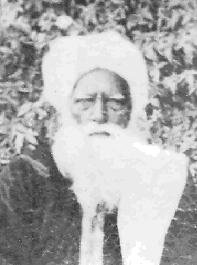
Photograph of Bhai Mool Singh Gurmula, a Sikh preacher that Kartar Singh came under the influence of in 1904

Kartar Singh was born in September 1874 to Teja Singh in a Virk family of Jhabbar village of Sheikhupura District in Punjab (British India). He comes from the lineage of the Jhabbar chiefs of Sheikhupura. Sardar Mahan Singh had attacked the Jhabbar chiefs but lost two battles to them. Later, Maharaja Ranjit Singh formed an alliance with the Jhabbar chiefs and Kartar Singh's grandfather Mangal Singh was in the service of Maharaja Ranjit Singh. Kartar Singh was born into a typical Punjabi peasant family but grew to a tall height, over six-feet, and had a masculine-appearance.

In 1904, Kartar Singh underwent the Pahul baptismal ceremony due to the influence of a roaming Sikh preacher named Bhai Mool Singh Gurmula, who administered the amrit to him. Jhabbar had become impressed by the speeches given by Mool Singh Gurmula at Virn village, which motivated him to start working for propagating the Sikh religion. In 1906, he enrolled at the Gharjakh Vidyala seminary [Khalsa Updeshak Mahavidyalaya] in Gujranwala, a training institute for Sikh preachers, where he spent three years. He began working as a Sikh religious preacher in 1909 and became a sewadar (volunteer) of the ongoing Singh Sabha movement, where he defended and pushed for lower-caste Hindus and Muslims to convert to Sikhism. During an incident at Kotli Dasu Singh village, a mob of 40–50 Muslims attacked a baptismal ceremony of a Muslim who desired to convert to Sikhism, Jhabbar and his crew fended off the attackers with their staffs. Jhabbar travelled across the Punjab and converted persons to Khalsa Sikhism after giving lectures. After two months of preaching, he recruited 500 members for the Singh Sabha. While he was giving lectures at Gurdwara Baoli Sahib, around five to six-thousand Sikhs would gather to listen to him talk. Eventually, Jhabbar moved his base-of-operations to Lahore. In 1912, he established a Khalsa middle-school in Sacha Sauda village in the Sheikhupura district, in-which he appointed Sardar Arjun Singh as the school's first president.

== Political career and activism ==
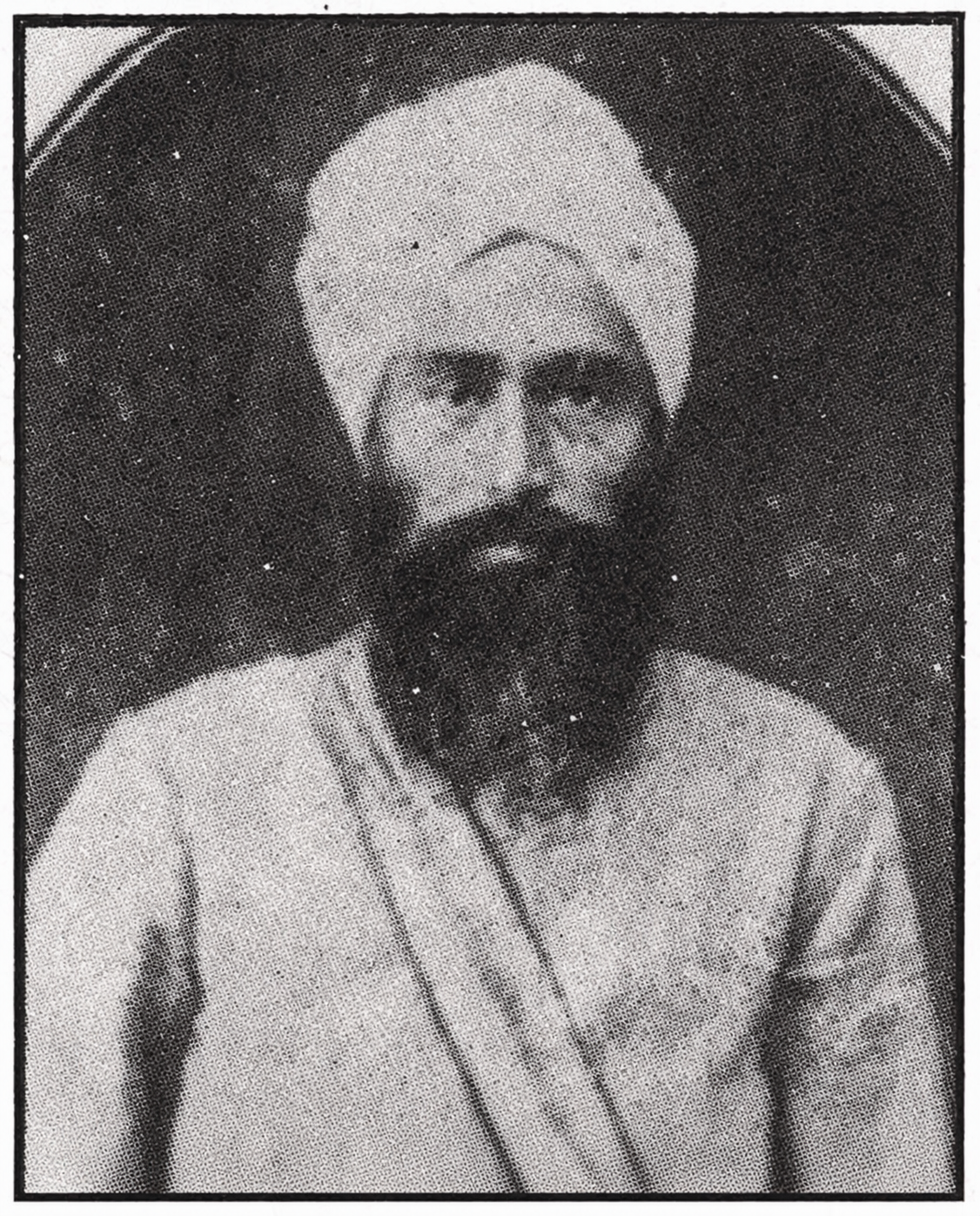
Portrait of Kartar Singh Jhabbar

In 1919, he and other Sikh leaders was arrested for anti-Government protests following the Jallianwala Bagh massacre. He was awarded a death-sentence in the Andaman jail, but was later released after the announcement of the royal clemency.

In the 1920s, Kartar Singh led the Gurdwara Reform Movement, which aimed at transferring the control of Sikh gurdwaras from traditional clergy (Udasi mahants) and Government-appointed managers to the Shiromani Gurdwara Parbandhak Committee (SGPC). In 1920, a jatha (volunteer group) led by him seized the control of the Babe di Ber gurdwara in Sialkot. He also played an important role in the SGPC's takeover of the Harmandir Sahib (Golden Temple), the holiest shrine of the Sikhs. He further helped the Akalis seize the control of Gurdwara Panja Sahib (Hasan Abdal, November 1920), Gurdwara Sacha Sauda (Chuhar Kana, December 1920), Gurdwara Sri Tarn Taran Sahib (January 1921) and Gurdwara Guru ka Bagh (near Amritsar, January 1921).

In 1921, Kartar Singh was arrested for protesting against the Nankana massacre, and again in 1924 for taking part in various Akali movement demonstrations. He was released in December 1928, because of poor health. He and his associates were involved in securing for SGPC the possession of properties attached to various gurdwaras, in accordance with the Sikh Gurdwaras Act, 1925.

== Later life and death ==
After the partition of India in 1947, Kartar Singh migrated to Habri village of Karnal district (in present day Kaithal district of Haryana). He was engaged in resettlement of refugees, and died in Habri, in 1962.

== Film and literature ==
Kartar Singh Jhabbar was shown in a Punjabi movie Saka - The Martyrs of Nankana Sahib where Mukul Dev was shown doing his lead role and the entire movie was based on Saka Nankana Sahib and Gurdwara Reform Movement
