= Ucha Pind =

- Village
- Location in Punjab, India Ucha Pind (India)
- Coordinates: 31.183010°N 75.710254°E
- Country: India
- State: Punjab
- District: Kapurthala

Government
  - Type: Panchayati raj (India)
  - Body: Gram panchayat

Population (2011)
  - Total: 1,544
- Sex ratio 776/768♂/♀

Languages
  - Official: Punjabi
  - Other spoken: Hindi
- Time zone: UTC+5:30 (IST)
- PIN: 144401
- Telephone code: 01822
- ISO 3166 code: IN-PB
- Vehicle registration: PB-09
- Website: kapurthala.gov.in

Ucha Pind is a village in Phagwara Tehsil in Kapurthala district of Punjab State, India. It is located 50 kilometres (31 mi) from Kapurthala, 9 kilometres (5.6 mi) from Phagwara. The village is administrated by a Sarpanch who is an elected representative of village as per the constitution of India and Panchayati raj (India).

== Transport ==
Phagwara Junction Railway Station, Mauli Halt Railway Station are the very nearby railway stations to Ucha Pind however, Jalandhar City Rail Way station is 22 kilometres (14 mi) from the village. The village is 116 kilometres (72 mi) from Sri Guru Ram Dass Jee International Airport in Amritsar; the nearest airport is Sahnewal Airport in Ludhiana, which is located 37 kilometres (23 mi) distant.
