= Sandhar Jagir =

- Village
- Location in Punjab, India Sandhar Jagir (India)
- Coordinates: 31.320553°N 75.268323°E
- Country: India
- State: Punjab
- District: Kapurthala

Government
  - Type: Panchayati raj (India)
  - Body: Gram panchayat

Population (2011)
  - Total: 513
- Sex ratio 260/253♂/♀

Languages
  - Official: Punjabi
  - Other spoken: Hindi
- Time zone: UTC+5:30 (IST)
- PIN: 144602
- Telephone code: 01822
- ISO 3166 code: IN-PB
- Vehicle registration: PB-09
- Website: kapurthala.gov.in

Sandhar Jagir is a village in Kapurthala district of Punjab State, India. It is located 13 kilometres (8.1 mi) from Kapurthala, which is both district and sub-district headquarters of Sandhar Jagir. The village is administrated by a Sarpanch who is an elected representative of village as per the constitution of India and Panchayati raj.

== Transport ==
Kapurthala Rail Way Station, Rail Coach Fact Rail Way Station are the nearby railway stations. Jalandhar City Rail Way station is 23 km away from the village. The village is 73 km away from Sri Guru Ram Dass Jee International Airport in Amritsar. Another near airport is Sahnewal Airport in Ludhiana which is located 77 km away from the village.
