= Saka – The Martyrs of Nankana Sahib =

Saka - The Martyrs of Nankana Sahib
- Directed by: Jagmeet Singh Samundri
- Written by: Jagmeet Singh Samundri
- Produced by: Sukhbir Sandhar; Harvinder Singh Sandhar
- Starring: Mukul Dev; Aman Dhaliwal; Oshin Brar; Ramit Ghai
- Production company: Sukhbir Sandhar Films pvt. Ltd
- Distributed by: Sandhar Films And Music
- Release date: April 8, 2016
- Running time: 131 minutes
- Country: India
- Language: Punjabi

Saka – The Martyrs of Nankana Sahib is an Indian Punjabi historical film about 1921 Nankana Sahib massacre directed and written by Jagmeet Singh Samundri, starring Mukul Dev, Aman Dhaliwal, and Oshin Brar.

== Plot ==
The film is about a massacre (Saka) that happened during Sikh protests of 1920–21 in peaceful efforts to liberate Gurdwara Janam Asthan at Nankana Sahib.

== Cast ==
- Mukul Dev as Lachhman Singh Dharowali
- Aman Dhaliwal
- Oshin Brar
- Dev Kharoud as Kehar Singh
- Hardeep Gill
- Stass Klassen as British governor of Lahore (Edward Douglas MacLagan)
- Mahabir Bhullar as Mahant Narain Dass

== Production ==
=== Filming ===
The set of Gurudwara Sahib was raised at cost of ₹50 lakh (US$52,000) spreading over 2.5 acres at village Ucha Pind, Phagwara by a team from Mumbai. Shooting was completed within 45 days as it rained incessantly during April 2015.

== Release ==
It was released worldwide on 8 April 2016. Shiromani Gurdwara Parbandhak Committee and team of film were angered at Central Board of Film Certification of India for giving 'A' certification to the film and at British Censors for '15 rating' to the film.
