= Mahant =

Superior position in Indian religions

Mahant (/məˈhʌnt/) is a religious superior, in particular the chief of a temple or the head of a monastery in Indian religions.

James Mallinson, one of the few westerners to be named as a mahant, describes the position of a mahant as a combination of an abbot and a brigadier.

== Etymology ==
The Hindi word mahant comes from Prakrit mahanta-, Sanskrit mahat (accusative case: mahantam) meaning "great".

== Hinduism ==
Other titles for the word Mahant, serving in the context of a well known religious place, include priest or pundit—generally always being a gyani or pastor.

Brahmins with Mahant surname are also found in Himachal Pradesh region. They speak local dialects of Pahari and Hindi and read and write in Devanagari. They are vegetarians. The Mahant are monogamous and marriage is by discussion. They make their living from the temples.

In other branches of Hinduism, the mahant is an ascetic who is the head and leader of the temple and has religious responsibilities as a preacher. Mahant is a title of Bairagis and Goswamis. However The post of Mahant can be achieved by a person of any caste, even today many castes are involved in the Mahant/joggi post.

== Sikhism ==
In Sikh history, the mahants (Gurmukhi: ਮਹੰਤ; mahata) were the hereditary managers who controlled and held the door keys of Sikh gurdwaras. After the creation of the SGPC and the Nankana massacre involving Mahant Narayan Das, a law was passed handing over gurdwaras to reformer Sikhs.
