= Baba Kharak Singh =

Indian playwright and political leader

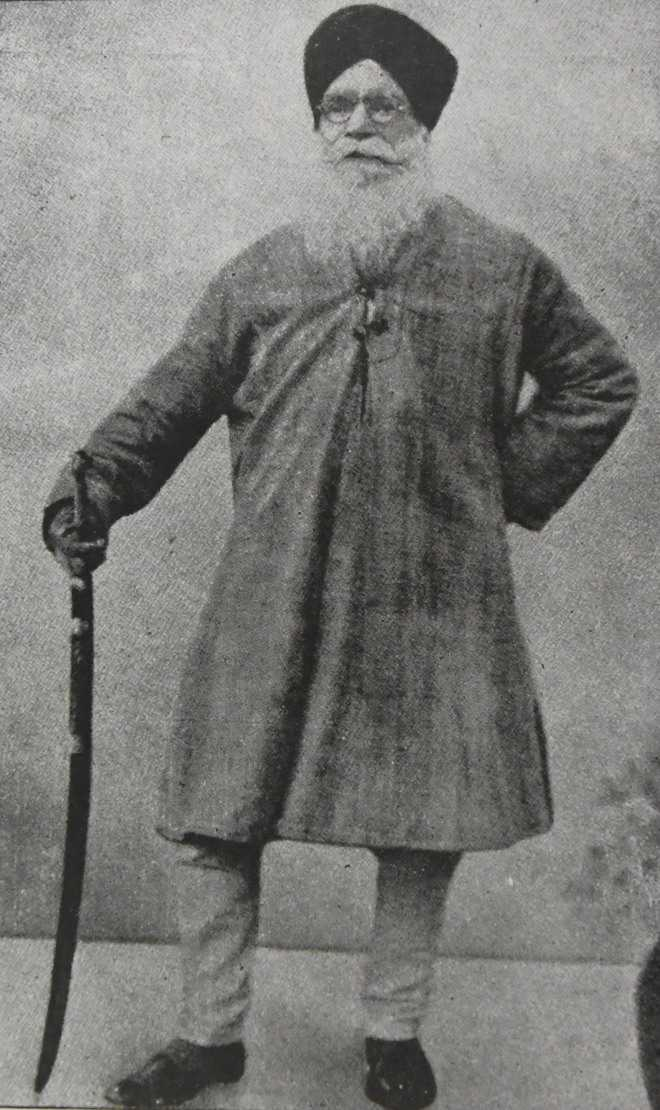

President of SGPC
- In office 14 August 1921 – 19 February 1922
- Preceded by: Sundar Singh Majithia
- Succeeded by: Sundar Singh Ramgharia
- In office 2 October 1926 – 12 October 1930
- Preceded by: Mangal Singh
- Succeeded by: Tara Singh

Personal details
- Born: 6 June 1868 Sialkot, British India (present-day in Pakistan)
- Died: 6 October 1963 (aged 95) Delhi, India
- Occupation: Playwright

Baba Kharak Singh (6 June 1867 — 6 October 1963) was a Sikh playwright born at Sialkot in British India. He was involved in the Indian independence movement and was president of the Central Sikh League. He was also one of the founders of the Shiromani Gurdwara Parbandhak Committee.

He was a Sikh political leader and virtually the first president of the Shiromani Gurdwara Parbandhak Committee. He was among the first batch of students who graduated (1889) from Punjab University, Lahore. His father, Rai Bahadur Sardar Hari Singh, was a wealthy contractor and industrialist. Today, a prominent road, which is a radial road of Connaught Place, New Delhi towards Gurdwara Bangla Sahib, is named Baba Kharak Singh Marg, after him.

== Early life ==
Kharak Singh was born in a Sikh Ahluwalia family, having passed his matriculation examination from Mission High School and intermediate from Murray College, both at Sialkot, after graduating in 1889 from University of the Punjab (Lahore), of which he was part of the first batch of the then newly established university, he joined the Law College at Allahabad, but the death of his father and elder brother in quick succession, interrupted his studies as he had to return to Sialkot to manage the family property.

He started his public life in 1912 as chairman of the reception committee of the 5th session of the Sikh Educational Conference held at Sialkot.

Three years later in 1915, as president of the 8th session of the Conference held at Tarn Taran, he surprised everyone by walking to the site of the conference, breaking the stately custom of arriving in a carriage pulled by six horses. He also refused permission for a proposed resolution to be moved at the conference wishing victory to the British in World War I.

The Jallianwala Bagh massacre of 1919 galvanised Kharak Singh as the virtual core of Sikh politics.

== Political life ==
After Jallianwala Bagh, Kharak Singh opposed perceived "traitors" within the Sikh leadership and the Chief Khalsa Diwan's pro-British slant. Thus, he formed the Central Sikh League in 1919 to resist British colonial rule.

Kharak Singh presided over the historic session of the Central Sikh League held in Lahore in 1920 where under his direction the Sikhs took part in the Non-cooperation movement. Mahatma Gandhi, the Ali brothers and Saifuddin Kitchlew also attended the event and advised the Sikhs to throw in their lot with the Congress Party. In this session Baba Kharak Singh very boldly advocated non-cooperation with the British government and advised his community to join the national forces.

Gurdwara Parbandhak Committee was formed in August 1921 with an ultimate object to take over the management of all historical Gurdwaras and Baba Kharak Singh was elected as its president in 1922. In 1921–22 he successfully led the first morcha (agitation) against the British government (November, 1921), which is popularly known as the Chabian Da Morcha (or 'Keys Agitation'). This was a Sikh protest requiring the return of the keys of the Toshakhana (treasury) of the Golden Temple, which had been seized by the British Deputy Commissioner of Amritsar. Kharak Singh was among the first to be arrested and this was the first of his numerous jail terms under the British. His arrest led to a vigorous storm of protest against the Government. Then government decided to give back the keys of the Toshakhana. On this occasion Mahatma Gandhi sent the following telegram to Baba Kharak Singh: "First decisive battle for India's freedom won. Congratulations."

In February 1922 Lala Lajpat Rai, then the president of Punjab Provincial Congress, was imprisoned and Baba Kharak Singh appointed as President of the Provincial Congress. Commenting in the issue Mahatma Gandhi wrote in "Young India" under the caption " It is indeed an excellent choice".

Kharak Singh and Nehru had a close-bond, with Nehru visiting his house in Delhi multiple times. In 1922, Kharak Singh became president of the Punjab Provincial Congress Committee. Kharak Singh remained a key-figure of the Akalis until 1935, when he was replaced by Master Tara Singh.

== Arrest and prison ==
He was jailed on 26 November 1921 for making an anti government speech, he was sentenced to six months imprisonment on 2 December 1921, but was released on 17 January 1922 when the keys of the toshakhana were also surrendered to him. In the same year he was elected President of Punjab Provincial Congress Committee.

Kharak Singh was, however, rearrested soon and, on 4 April 1922, he was awarded one year in jail for running a factory that manufactured kirpans (one of the religious symbols of the Sikhs): to which another three years were added, on charges of making seditious speeches.

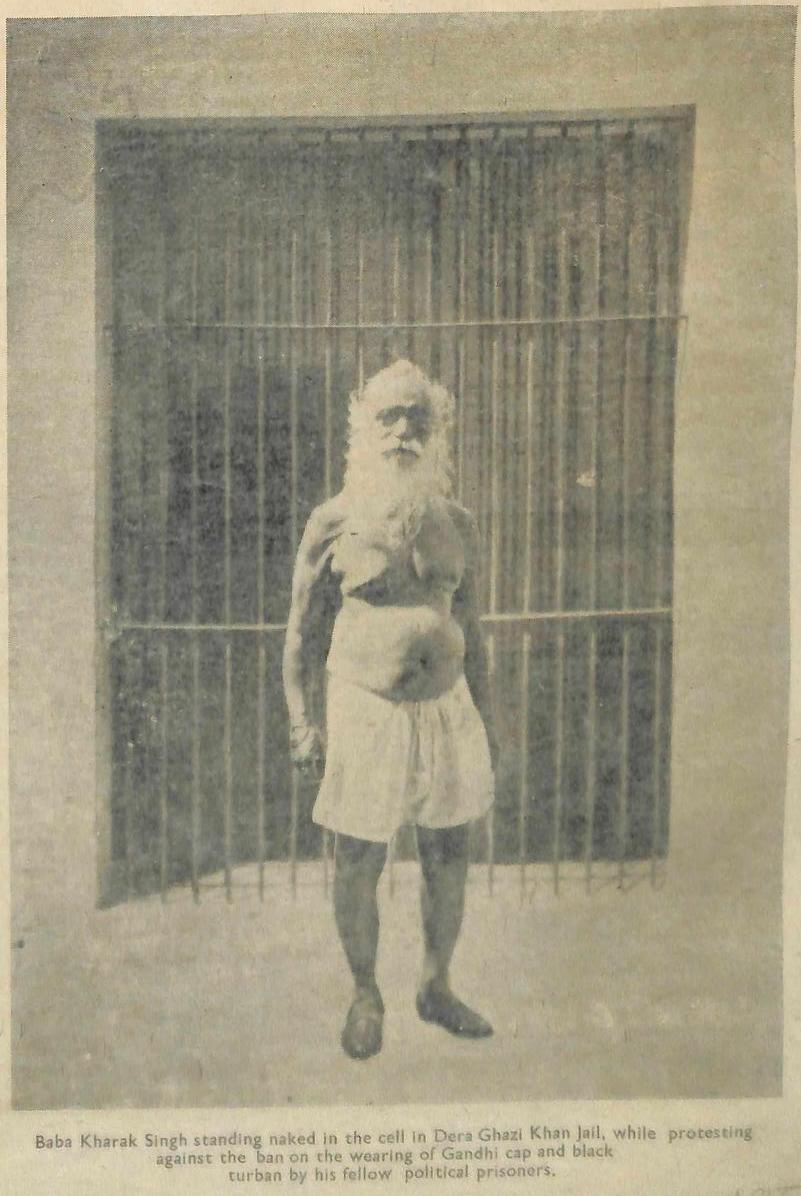
Photograph of Baba Kharak Singh standing in his cell in only his kachera undergarments at Dera Ghazi Khan Jail in-protest

He was sent to jail in distant Dera Gazi Khan (now a district in Pakistan Punjab), where in protest against the forced removal of the turbans of Sikh and the 'Gandhi caps' of non-Sikh political prisoners, he discarded all his clothes except his kachahira (underpants), another of the religious symbols of the Sikhs. He managed to get the jailers to forfeit the ban on black-coloured turbans, however Kharak Singh still refused to wear clothes besides his undergarments despite Congress leaders pleading to him to wear them. Despite the extreme weather conditions of the place, he remained bare-backed until he was released after his full term (twice extended for non-obedience of orders) on 4 June 1927. He walked-out of jail only wearing his undergarments. After his release, he took part in a procession in Amritsar and Lahore, which had thousands of spectators.

== Struggle against British rule ==
He organized a mammoth demonstration in 1928 when the Simon Commission visited Lahore. At a presidential address speech given at Lahore in December 1929 whilst presiding over the All-India Sikh Conference held to protest the findings of the Simon Commission, he stated the following:

In the fight for India's freedom if you find a bullet in my back do not count me as one amongst the Sikhs of the Gurus and do not cremate my dead body according to the Sikh rites. A disciple of the Great Gurus is an ideal saint-soldier and is; supposed to fight in the vanguard and face the bullet in the chest and not in the back. We, the Sikhs, shall never allow any foreigner to rule our Motherland and we shall brook no injustice.

— Kharak Singh (December 1929), extract of his presidential address whilst presiding over the All-India Sikh Conference held in Lahore

Also during 1928-29, he vehemently opposed the Nehru Committee Report until the Congress Party shelved it and took action to secure the Sikhs' concurrence in the framing of constitutional proposals in the future. He was again sent to jail in 1931 but was released after six months. He was re-arrested in 1932 and served another 19 months in prison.

The Sikh opposition to the Swaraj colours articulated in as early as 1921 and took shape progressively. In 1929, a deputation of the Sikhs met Mahatma Gandhi at Lahore and made a firm demand that the Sikh colour, a shade of Yellow or black, be added to the Swaraj flag. In March 1930, when Gandhi launched Civil Disobedience Movements, Baba Kharak Singh, President of the Shiromani Gurdwara Prabandhak Committee, refused to join the movement, if the Sikh colour Saffron was not included in the flag.

He spoke out in opposition to the Communal Award, which gave a statutory majority to Muslims in the Punjab, and was in and out of jail on several occasions for making speeches that the British government held to be seditious. In 1935 he was, once again, taken into custody for his scathing criticism of the Communal Award.

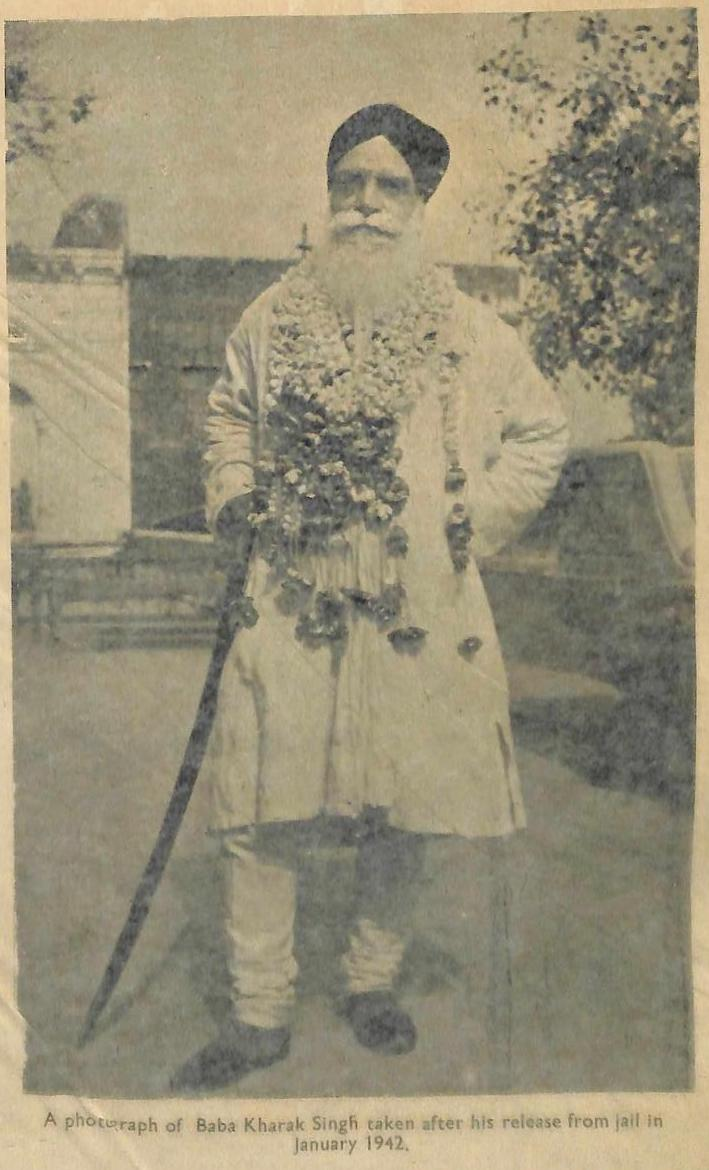
Photograph of Baba Kharak Singh taken after his release from jail in January 1942

In 1940 Kharak Singh was again sent to the jail for participating in the Satyagrah movement, but in spite of his old age, Kharak did not stop his activities.

== Later life and death ==
In 1947, Kharak Singh travelled across the Punjab to oppose the planned partitioning of India. After the partition of 1947, Kharak Singh stayed in Delhi in virtual retirement from public life. In 1953, he was presented the Abhinandan Granth by Rajendra Prasad, President of India. Kharak Singh died on 6 October 1963, aged 95.

== Legacy ==
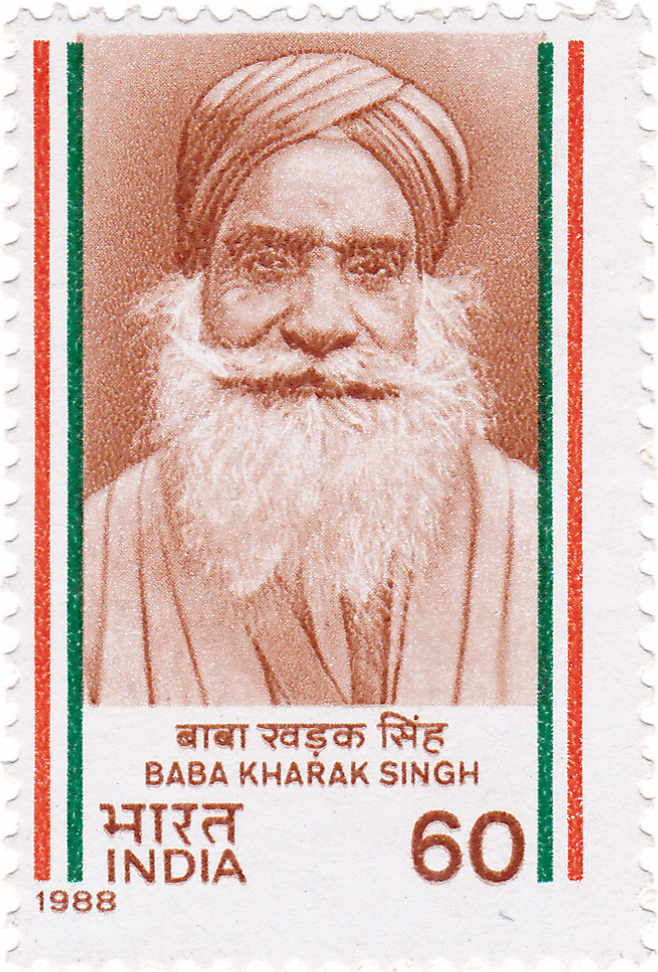
Baba Kharak Singh depicted on a 1988 stamp of India

His legacy has been forgotten by the Congress party, however the Akali Dal pays minimal tribute to him for being one of the founders of the Shiromani Gurdwara Parbandhak Committee.

Abdul Ghaffar Khan had been lodged with Kharak Singh in the same prison and stated the following on him:

Kharak Singh was a powerful man, firm and immoveable like a mountain. Nobody could order him. In spite of all the suffering, he never lost his courage and determination.

— Abdul Ghaffar Khan
