= Nankana massacre =

1921 massacre at Gurdwara Janam Asthan, Nankana Sahib

- Part of Akali movement
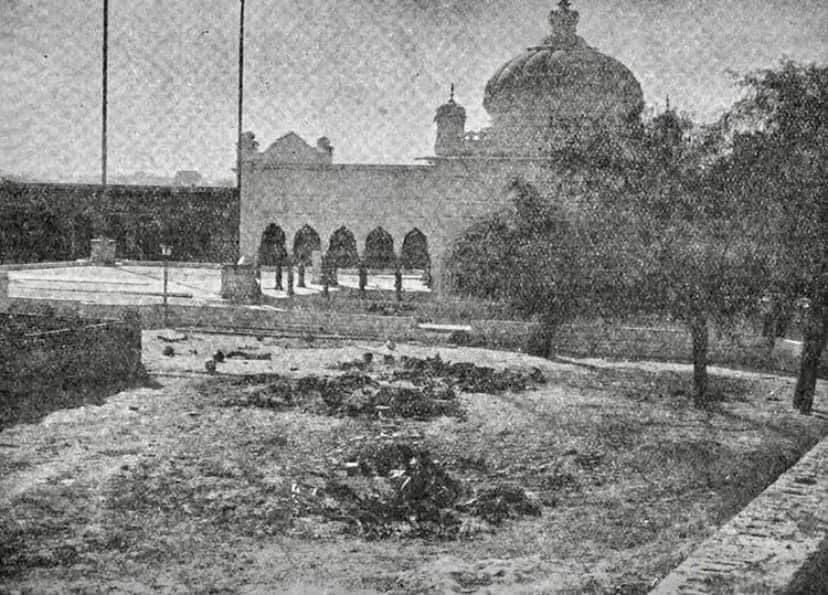
- Photograph of the remains of charred Sikh victims in the aftermath of the Nankana massacre ('Saka Nankana'), February 1921
- Location: 31°27′0″N 73°42′24″E; Nankana Sahib, Punjab, British India (now in Pakistan)
- Date: 20 February 1921
- Target: Sikhs
- Attack type: Mass shooting, religious violence
- Deaths: 140-260 Sikhs
- Victim: Sikhs

The Nankana massacre (also known as Saka Nankana Sahib) occurred on the premises of Gurdwara Janam Asthan, Nankana Sahib on 20 February 1921, then part of the Punjab Province of British India, and today in modern-day Pakistan. Between 140 and 260 Sikhs were killed, including children, by the Udasi Custodian Narayan Das and his mercenaries, in retaliation for a confrontation between him and members of the reformist Akali movement, who accused him of both corruption and sexual impropriety. The event constitutes an important part of Sikh history. In political significance, it comes next only to the Jallianwala Bagh massacre of April 1919. The saga constitutes the core of the Gurdwara Reform Movement started by the Sikhs in the early twentieth century.

== Background ==
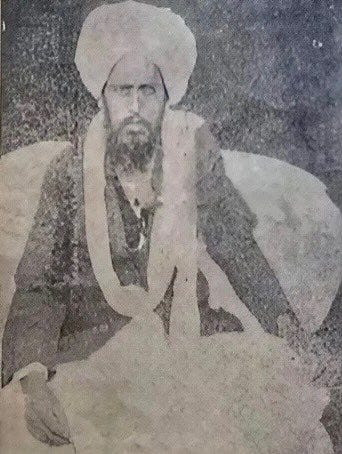
Photograph of Mahant Narayan Das, the last Udasi custodian of Nankana Sahib and accused perpetrator of the Nankana massacre

At the time of the massacre, there was a growing demand in Sikhism that the traditional hereditary custodians hand over their control of the gurdwaras to democratically elected committees. As part of that movement, the Shiromani Committee decided on its own to meet the Mahant on 3 March 1921 to advise him to hand over the charge of gurdwara Nankana Sahib to the committee. But the Committee got the information from its own intelligence that Mahant was planning to invite the Sikh leaders to Nanakana Sahib and have them killed by hired goondas. This greatly angered Kartar Singh Jhabbar and others. A meeting of the Sikh leaders was called at Gurdwara Khara Sauda on 16 February 1921 to chalk out the future course of action. It was decided that Sangat would go in Jathas (troops) and take charge of the Gurdwara. Sikh leaders learned that Mahant was going to Lahore on 20 February 1921. Bhai Kartar Singh Jhabbar and Bhai Lachaman Singh Dharowali decided to take their jathas to Nanakana Sahib on 20 February.

== Lead-up ==
The combined Jatha took a Hukamnama and started for the Gurdwara at about 10 PM on that night so as to reach there by early morning at Amrit Velā (the holy time of prayer). On the way 50 more Sikhs joined the Shaheedi Jatha and the total number swelled to about 200. At Chanderkot Jhal, Jathedar Lachhman Singh decided to wait for Kartar Singh Jhabber and his Jatha. They waited for a while in vain and finally, Jathedar Dharowali decided to cancel the plan for further march to Nankana Sahib. But at this very moment, Jathedar Tehal Singh came forward and addressed the Shaheedi Jatha not to vacillate even for a moment from the forward march since "the prayers having already been said and the action plan having already been decided with Guru's word, it is now imperative for now to move forward". Advising further that "all the members shall keep cool even under extreme provocations". From here-on, Jathedar Tehal Singh took over the supreme command of the Shaheedi Jatha and resumed the march to Nankana.

By almost at Amrit Velā, the Shaheedi Jatha reached the railway crossing near Nankana Sahib. Some of the Jatha members raced towards Darshani Deori to take possession of the Gurdawara, but at this very moment, Chaudhury Paul Singh Lyallpuri showed up with the latest decision of the Shiromani Committee advising to postpone the action for taking possession of the Gurdwara. Having conveyed the information, Bhai Paul Singh grabbed Jathedar Lachhman Singh from his waist behind and persuaded him not to proceed further. Once again, Jathedar Tehal Singh took the initiative and shaking Chaudhury Paul Singh forcefully off from the person of Jathedar Lachhman Singh, he once more challenged the Shaheedi Jatha to get ready for the sublime action. He once again spoke: "Khalsa ji, the time is not to stop now, but to act. We have come here to achieve martyrdom under Guru's word. This is very un-Sikh-like to back out [sic] from one's commitment at the last moment". Saying this, Tehal Singh walked with the Jatha towards the Gurdwara. Lachhman Singh and others repeatedly requested him to relent, but Tehal Singh stuck to his Ardās.

== The massacre ==
Enthused by the speech of Jathedar Tehal Singh, the entire Shaheedi Jatha followed him. By this time, another horseman messenger, Bhai Ram Singh, arrived. In vain he tried to persuade Jathedar Tehal Singh and the Jatha to return. The Jatha soon entered Darshni Deohri of the Gurdwara and shut the main door from inside. While some of the devotees took their seats inside the Prakash Asthan, others sat on the platform and the Baran dari. Bhai Lachhman Singh Dharowali sat on Guru's tabia. Mahant Narayan Das learned of the situation through the Jaikaras (victory slogans) of the Shaheedi Jatha. At first, he was utterly shocked thinking that the game was over, but he soon recovered and ordered his mercenaries to kill everyone in the Jatha. They fired bullets at the Sangat in Gurdwara Hall. Several bullets pierced Sri Guru Granth Sahib. The hired goondas armed with swords, spears, hatchets, and other lethal weapons mercilessly slaughtered the peaceful Sikhs within the very premises of the Gurdwara. The dead and dying Singhs were then dragged to a pile of logs that had been collected earlier and consigned to flame. By the time the police and local Sikhs arrived, all the dead men had been consumed by the fire.

== Response ==
Bhai Lachhman Singh Dharowali who was wounded by a gunshot was tied to a Jand tree and burnt alive.

The news spread and Sikhs from throughout Punjab marched towards Nankana Sahib. Bhai Kartar Singh Jhabber reached the next day with 2200 Singhs armed with shastrs (weapons). Fearing more trouble, Mr. King, Commissioner Lahore, handed over the keys of Nankana Sahib to the Shiromani Committee and arrested Mahant Narayan Das and his Pashtun mercenaries and charged them with murder, but only Das and some of the mercenaries were sentenced to death.

== Statistics on fatalities ==
Officially, 86 Sikhs died. Other sources give the figures of Sikh fatalities as either 140 or 260.

== Legacy ==
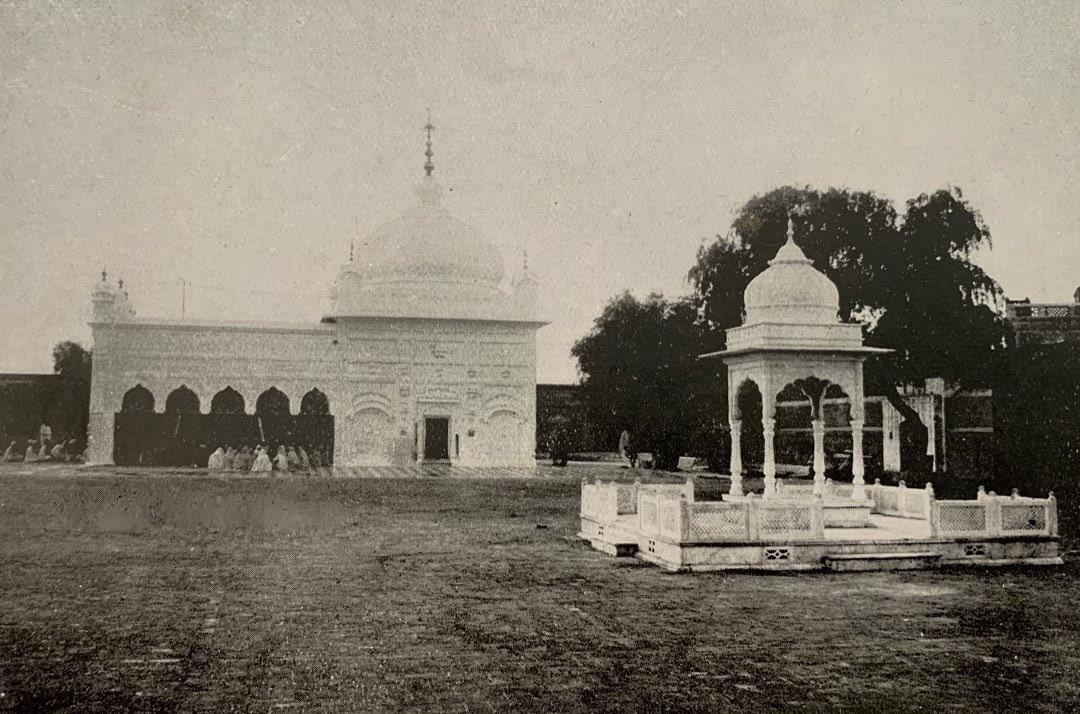
Photograph of Gurdwara Janam Asthan in Nankana Sahib, 1935. The Janam Asthan [sacred birthplace that is marked by the main shrine], Shahid Ganj [place of martyrdom], and Shahidi Jand [martyrs' tree], from which many Sikhs were tied upside-down and were burnt-alive during the Nankana massacre of 1921, are visible.

Every year on 20 February at this Shaheedi Asthan, Guru Granth Sahib's Saroop with bullet marks is brought to Deewan (assembly) from 2 pm to 4 pm for darshan of the Sikh Sangat.

== Film, books and periodicals ==
- Saka – The Martyrs of Nankana Sahib
- Gurdwara Reform Movement, and The Sikh Awakening, 1984, Teja Singh
- Akali, Lahore, October 8, 1920
- Akali Morchian Da Itihaas, 1977, Sohan Singh Josh
- Meri Aap Beeti, Master Sunder Singh Lyalpuri (unpublished)
- Gurdwara Arthaat Akali Lehir, 1975, Giani Pratap Singh
- Struggle for Reform in Sikh Shrines, (Ed Dr Ganda Singh)
- Khushwant Singh: A History of the Sikhs, 1966.
- Shaheedi Jeewan, 1938, Gurbaksh Singh Shamsher
- Glimpses of Sikhism and Sikhs, 1982, Sher Singh Sher
- Encyclopedia of Sikhism, Vol I, II, Harbans Singh

== Gallery ==
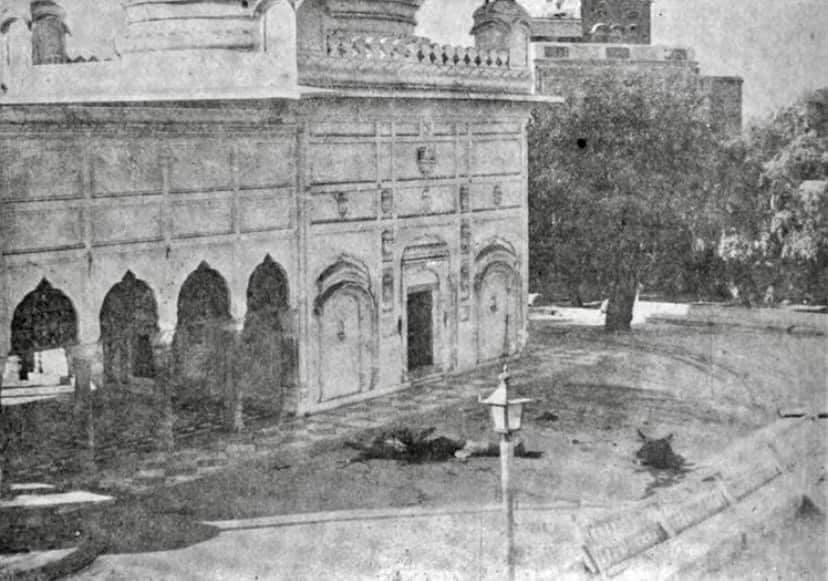
Remains of slaughtered Sikh victims in the aftermath of the Nankana massacre ('Saka Nankana'), February 1921

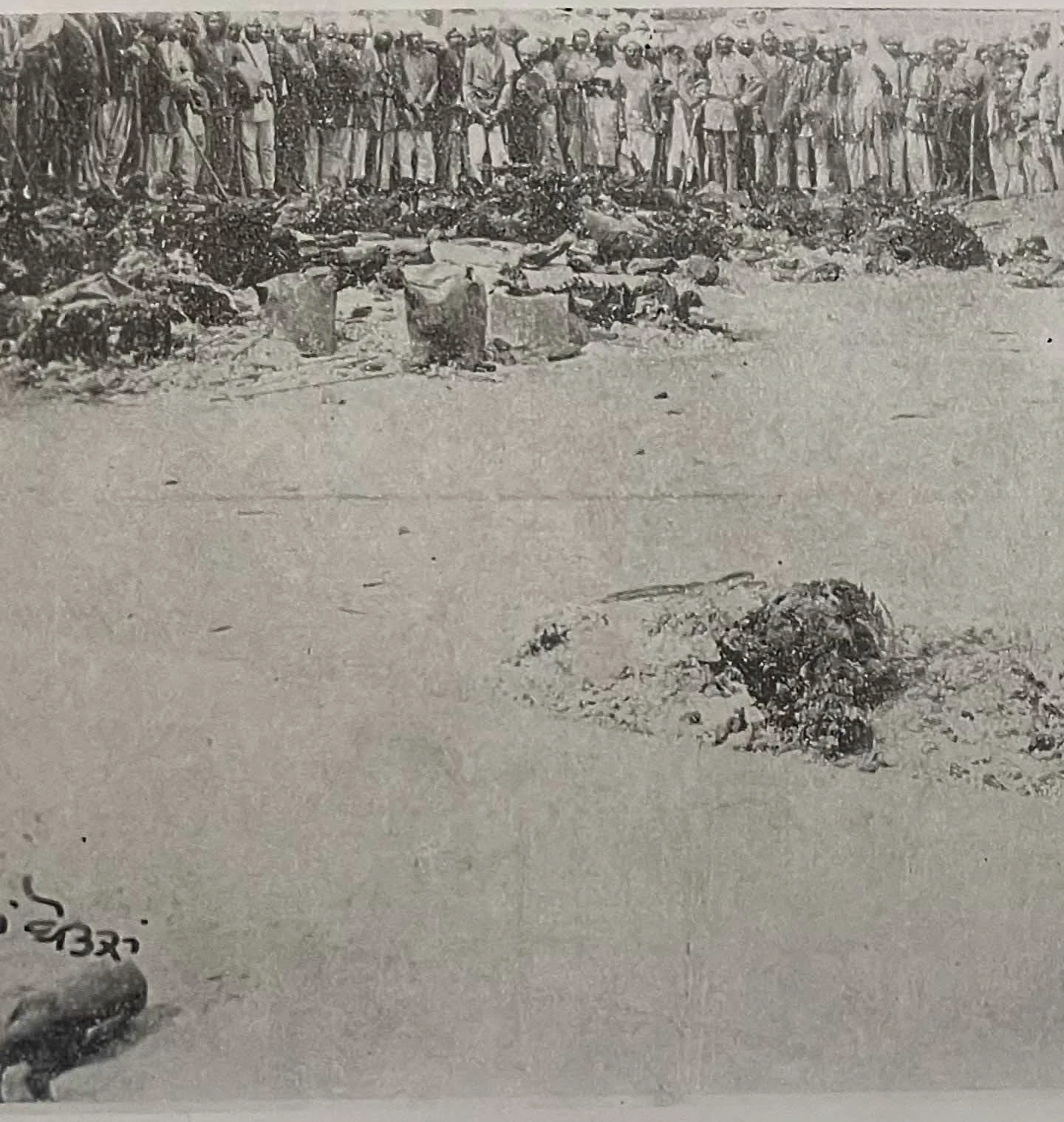
Charred remains of Sikhs murdered in the Nankana massacre

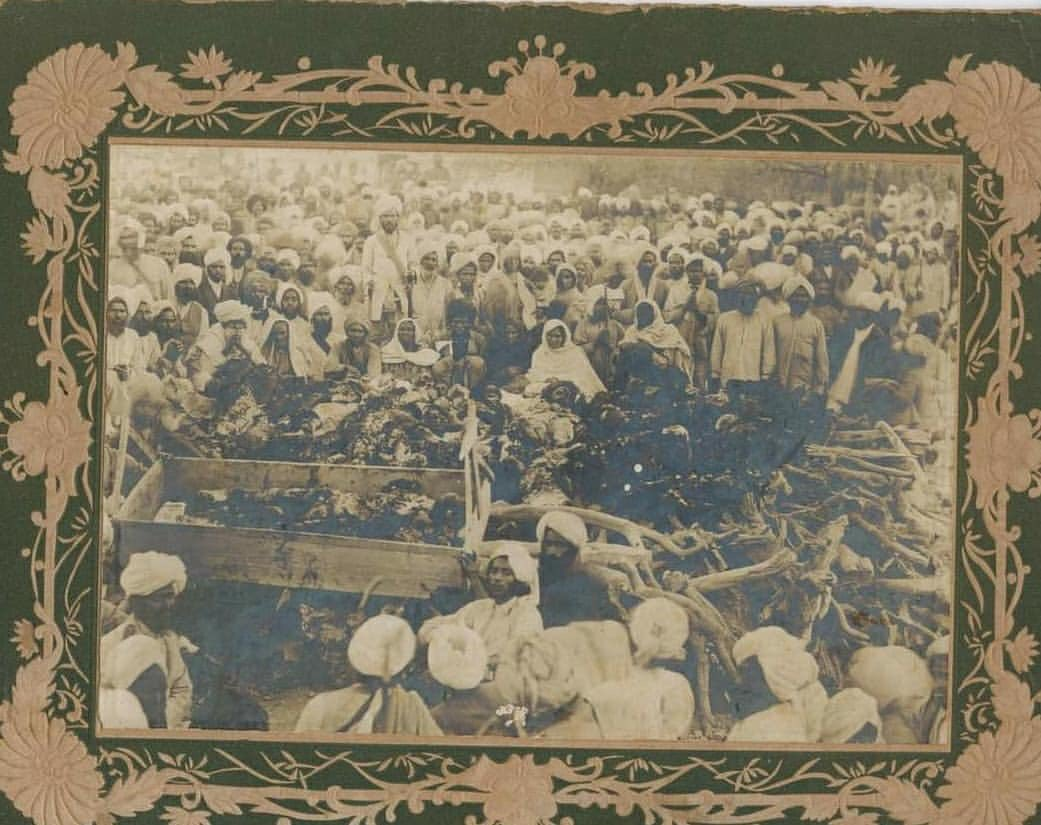
Photograph of the mass funeral of Sikh martyrs of the Nankana massacre ('Saka Nankana'), ca.1921

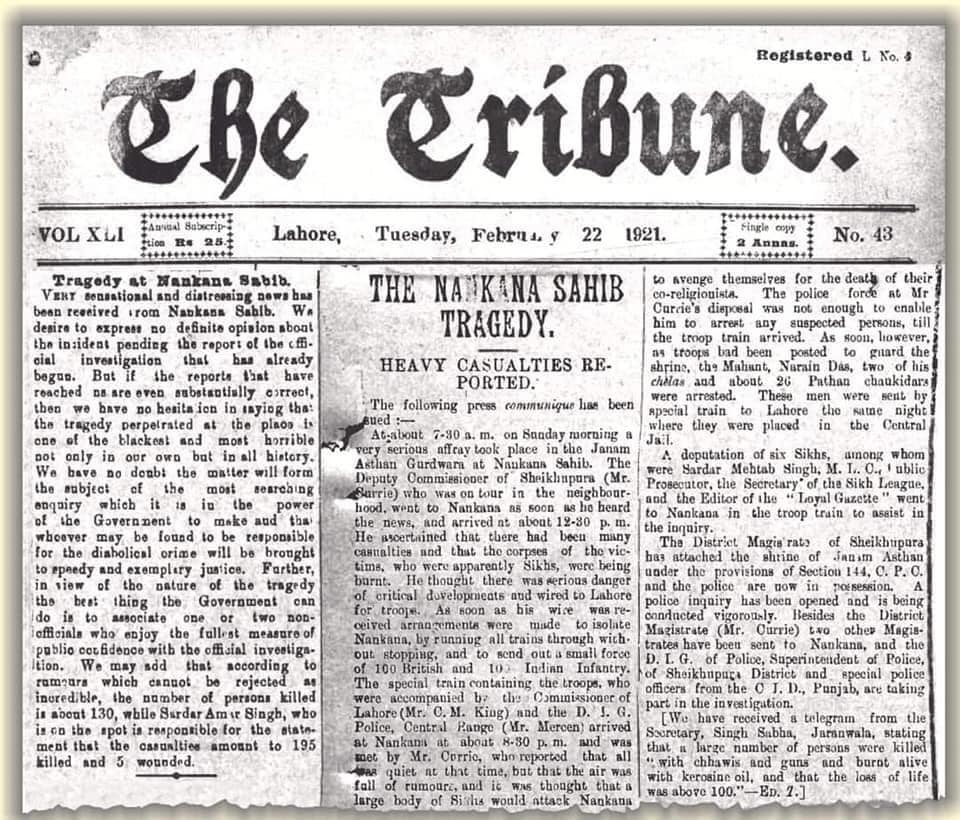
The Tribune newspaper article reporting on the events of the Nankana massacre ('Saka Nankana') on 22 February 1921

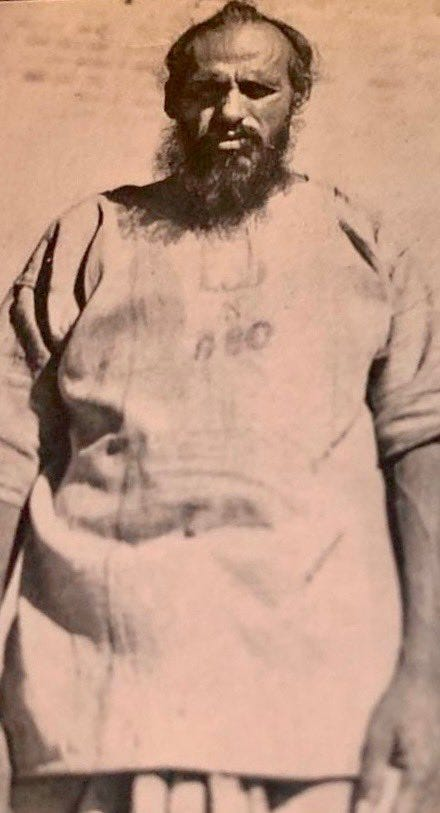
Photograph of Mahant Narayan Das after courting arrest
