= 1926 Indian general election =

- 1926

105 seats contested 53 seats needed for a majority
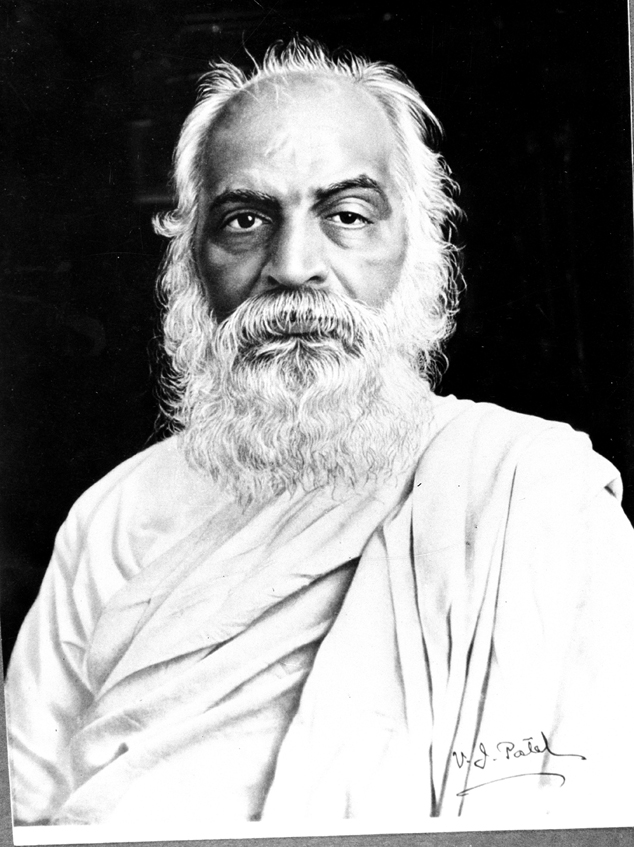

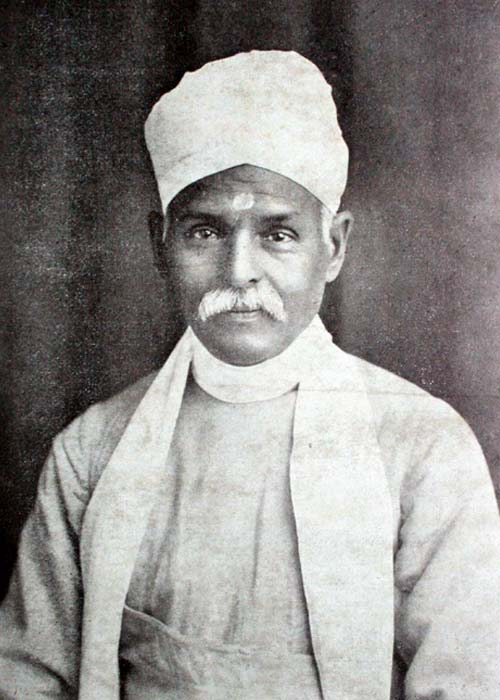
	First party	Second party
Leader	Vithalbhai Patel	Madan Mohan Malaviya
Party	SP	NP
Seats won	38	22

General elections were held in British India between 28 October and late November 1926 to elect members of the Imperial Legislative Council and the provincial legislative councils.

The Swaraj Party was victorious in provincial council elections in Bengal and Madras, and also made gains in Bihar and Orissa. However, at the national level, the party saw their number of seats reduced.

== Results ==
=== Central Legislative Assembly ===
Party	Seats
Swaraj Party	38
Nationalist Party	22
Central Muslims and Allies	18
Minor parties, unattached independents, unknown	5
Europeans	9
Independents	13
Total	105
Source: Schwartzberg Atlas

== Members of Central Legislative Assembly ==
=== Officials ===
- Government of India: Sir James Crerar (Home Member), Alexander Muddiman (Home Member), Sir George Rainy (Railways, Commerce & Ecclesiastical Member), George Ernest Schuster (Finance Member), Sir Brojendra Mitter (Law Member), Bhupendra Nath Mitra (Industries & Labour Member), Evelyn Berkeley Howell, Alfred Alen Lethbridge Parsons, Hubert Arthur Sams, Gerard Macworth Young, Kodikal Sanjiva Row, Clement Wansbrough Gwynne, John Coatman, Sir Frank Noyce, Hattiangadi Shankar Rau
- Provinces: Samuel Henry Slater (Madras), A. Upendra Pai (Madras), John Monteath (Bombay), Vyvyan Macleod Ferrers (Bombay), Joseph Charles French (Bengal), Rajnarayan Banarji (Bengal), J. T. Donovan (Bengal), Nasiruddin Ahmad (Bengal), Hugh Stuart Crosthwaite (United Provinces), M. Keane (United Provinces), Khan Bahadur Mian Abdul Aziz (Punjab), Ram Prasad Narayan Sahi (Bihar & Orissa), Shyam Narayan Singh (Bihar & Orissa), Kismet Leland Brewer Hamilton (Central Provinces), H. C. Greenfield (Central Provinces), William Alexander Cosgrave (Assam), Ernest Frederick Baum (Burma), H. Tonkinson (Burma)

=== Nominated non-officials ===
- Provinces: Rai Bahadur Satya Charan Mukherjee (Bengal), Keshab Chandra Roy (Bengal), Dr. Ratanji Dinshah Dalal (Bombay), Muhammad Yamin Khan (United Provinces), Sardar Bahadur Jawahar Singh (Punjab), Sardar Bahadur Captain Hira Singh Brar (Punjab), Hony. Captain Rao Bahadur Ch. Lal Chand (Punjab), Sir Zulfikar Ali Khan (Punjab), Madhav Shrihari Aney (Berar), Mariadas Ruthnaswamy (Madras), R. Srinivasa Sarma (Bihar & Orissa)
- Special Interests: Henry Gidney (Anglo-Indian), Rev. Jotish Chandra Chatterjee (Indian Christians), Sir James Simpson (Associated Chambers of Commerce), L. V. Heathcote (Associated Chambers of Commerce), G. W. Chambers (Associated Chambers of Commerce), Narayan Malhar Joshi (Labour Interests), M. C. Rajah (Depressed Classes)

=== Elected non-officials ===
- Ajmer-Merwara: Harbilas Sarda
- Assam: Tarun Ram Phookan (Assam Valley General), Srischandra Dutta (Surma Valley cum Shillong General), Maulvi Abdul Matin Chaudhury (Muslim), T. A. Chalmers (Europeans)
- Bengal: T. C. Goswami (Calcutta Suburbs General), Bhabendra Chandra Roy (Presidency General), Amar Nath Dutt (Burdwan General), K. C. Neogy (Dacca General), Satyendra Chandra Mitra (Chittagong & Rajshahi General), Mohamed Rafique (Calcutta & Suburbs Muslim), Abdullah Al-Mamun Suhrawardy (Burdwan & Presidency Muslim), Sir Abdul Halim Ghaznavi (Dacca), Haji Choudhary Mohamad Ismail Khan (Dacca Muslim), Muhammad Anwar-ul-Azim (Chittagong Muslim), Khabeeruddin Ahmed (Rajshahi), Sir Darcy Lindsay (Europeans), Arthur Moore (Europeans), Col. J. D. Crawford (Europeans), Dhirendra Kanta Lahiri Chaudhury (Landholders), Rai Bahadur Tarit Bhushan Roy (Marwari Association), J. F. Fyfe (Bengal Chamber of Commerce)
- Bihar & Orissa: Nilakantha Das (Orissa General), Bhabananda Das (Orissa General), Rajivarandan P. Sinha (Patna-cum-Shahabad General), Anugrah Narayan Sinha (Patna-cum-Shahabad General), Siddheswar Prasad Singh (Gaya-cum-Monghyr General), Ganganand Sinha (Bhagalpur, Purnea & Santhal Parganas), Ramnarayan Singh (Chota Nagpur General), Khan Bahadur Sarfaraz Hussain Khan (Patna & Chota Nagpur cum Orissa Muslim), Moulvi Badl-us-zaman (Bhagalpur Muslim), Maulvi Muhammad Shafee (Tirhut Muslim), Raja Raghunandan Parshad Singh (Landholders), Gaya Prasad Singh (Muzaffarpur-cum-Champaran General), Hari Prasad Lal
- Bombay: M. R. Jayakar (Bombay City General), Jamnadas Mehta (Bombay City General), Lalchand Navalrai (Sind Rural General), Seth Harchandrai Vishandas (Sindh General), Vithalbhai Patel (Bombay Northern General), N. C. Kelkar (Bombay Central General), Sarabhai Nemchand Haji (Bombay Central General), Muhammad Ali Jinnah (Bombay City Muslim), Fazal I Rahimtoola (Bombay Central Muslim), Abdullah Haroon (Sindh Muslim), Shah Nawaz Bhutto(Sindh Muslim), Wadero Mohomed Panah Ghulam Kadirkhan Dakhan (Sind Muslim), Sir Hugh Cocke (Europeans), E. F. Sykes (Europeans), Homi Mody (Bombay Millowners Association), Purshotamdas Thakurdas (Indian Merchants' Chamber and Bureau), Wahid Baksh Bhutto (Sindh Jagirdars & Zamindars), Joseph Baptista, Sir Jehangir Cowasji, Kikabhai Premchand
- Burma: Jehangir K. Munshi (General), U. Tok Kyi (General), U. Hla Tun Pru (General), W. Stenhouse Lamb (European)
- Central Provinces: B. S. Moonje (Nagpur General), Hari Singh Gour (Hindi Divisions General), Dwarka Prasad Misra (Hindi Divisions General), Dr. Abdul Qadir Siddiq (Muslim), Seth Jamnadass (Landholders)
- Delhi: Lala Rang Behari Lal
- Madras: S. Srinivasa Iyengar (Madras City General), Tanguturi Prakasam (East and West Godavari cum Krishna General), Battena Perumalla Nayudu (Guntur-cum-Nellore General), Chetluru Doraiswamy Ayyangar (Madras ceded districts & Chittoor General), R. K. Shanmukham Chetty (Salem and Coimbatore cum North Arcot General), M. K. Acharya (South Arcot General), A. Rangaswami Iyengar (Tanjore cum Trichinopoly General), M. R. Ry. Mudumbi Srinivasachariar Seshayyangar (Madura and Ramnad-cum-Tinnevelly General), M. R. Ry. G. Sarvothama Rao Avargal (West Coast & Nilgiris General), Abdul Latif Sahib Farookhi (North Madras Muslim), Maulvi Syed Murtuza Sahab Bahadur (South Madras Muslim),Khan Bahadur Haji Abdullah Haji Kassim (West Coast & Nilgiris Muslim), William Alexander (European), K. V. Rangaswami Ayyangar (Landholders), Vidya Sagar Pandya (Madras Indian Commerce), T. Rangachari, Rama Iyengar, P. S. Sivaswami Iyer, T. N. Ramakrishna Reddi, Bhupatiraju Venkatapatiraju
- NWFP: Sahibzada Abdul Qayyum
- Punjab: Pandit Thakur Das Bhargava (Ambala General), Lala Lajpat Rai (Jullundur General), Diwan Chaman Lall (West Punjab General), Abdul Haye (East Punjab Muslim), Sir Zulfiqar Ali Khan (East Central Punjab Muslim), Mian Sir Muhammad Shah Nawaz (West Central Punjab Muslim), Ghazanfar Ali Khan (North Punjab Muslim), Sayyed Hussain Shah (North-West Punjab Muslim), Makhdum Syed Rajan Baksh Shah (South-West Punjab Muslim), Sardar Gulab Singh (West Punjab Sikh), Sardar Kartar Singh (East Punjab Sikh)
- United Provinces: Motilal Nehru (UP Cities General), Chaudhri Mukhtar Singh (Meerut General), Pandit Shamlal Nehru (Meerut General), H. N. Kunzru (Agra General), Lala Girdharilal Agarwala (Agra General), C. S. Ranga Iyer (Rohilkhand & Kumaon General), Madan Mohan Malaviya (Allahabad & Jhanshi General), Ghanshyam Das Birla (Benares and Gorakpur General), Pandit Krishna Kant Malaviya (Benares and Gorakpur General), Munshi Iswar Saran (Lucknow General), Sankata Prasad Bajpai (Lucknow General), Kunwar Rananjay Singh (Fyzabad General), Tasadduq Ahmad Khan Sherwani (UP Cities General), Dr. L. K. Hyder (Agra Rural Muslim), Sir Muhammad Yakub (Rohilkhand & Kumaon Muslim), Lala Tirloki Nath (Landholders), Tracey Gavin Jones (European), J. Ramsay Scott (European), Rafi Ahmed Kidwai

== Elected members of Council of State ==
- John William Anderson Bell (Bengal Chamber of Commerce)
- Mahmood Suhrawardy (West Bengal : Muhammadan)
- Maulvi Abdul Karim (East Bengal: Muhammadan)
- Lokenath Mukherjee (West Bengal: Non-Muhammadan), Swaraj
- Rai Bahadur Nalini Nath Sett (West Bengal : Non-Muhammadan)
- Sir Arthur Froom (Bombay Chamber of Commerce)
- Mian Ali Baksh Muhammad Hussain (Sind : Muhammadan)
- Ebrahim Haroon Jaffer (Bombay Presidency : Muhammadan)
- Manmohandas Ramji Vora (Bombay : Non-Muhammadan)
- Pheroze Sethna (Bombay: Non-Muhammadan)
- Ratansi D. Morarji (Bombay: Non-Muhamaddan)
- Maneckji Dadabhoy (Bombay: Non-Muhamaddan)
- Nawab Sahibzada Sayad Mohammad Mehr Shah (East and West Punjab: Muhammadan)
- Lala Ram Saran Das (Punjab: Non-Muhammadan)
- Saiyed Mohamad Padshah Sahib Bahadur (Madras : Muhammadan)
- Dr. U. Rama Rao (Madras: Non-Muhammadan), Swaraj
- V. Ramadas Pantulu (Madras: Non-Muhammadan)
- Sir C. Sankaran Nair (Madras: Non-Muhammadan)
- Pundi Chetlur Desika Chari (Burma: General)
- Sir Edgar Holberton (Burma Chamber of Commerce)
- Maulvi Golam Mostafa Chaudhury (Assam : Muhammadan)
- Seth Govind Das (Central Provinces: General)
- Shah Muhammad Zubair (Bihar and Orissa: Muhammadan)
- Anugrah Narayan Sinha (Bihar and Orissa: Non-Muhammadan)
- Mahendra Prasad (Bihar and Orissa: Non-Muhammadan)
- Saiyid Alay Nabi (United Provinces West: Muhammadan)
- Raja Moti Chand (United Provinces Southern: Non-Muhammadan)
- Raja Sir Rampal Singh (United Provinces Central : Non-Muhamrnudan)
