= Council of State (India) =

Legislature house in British India

- Imperial Legislative Council
- Star of India

Type
- Type: Upper house of the Imperial Legislative Council

History
- Founded: 23 December 1919
- Disbanded: 14 August 1947
- Succeeded by: Constituent Assembly of India
- Seats: not more than 60

Elections
- Voting system: Single transferable vote
- Last election: 1945 Indian general election

Motto
- Heaven's Light Our Guide

Meeting place
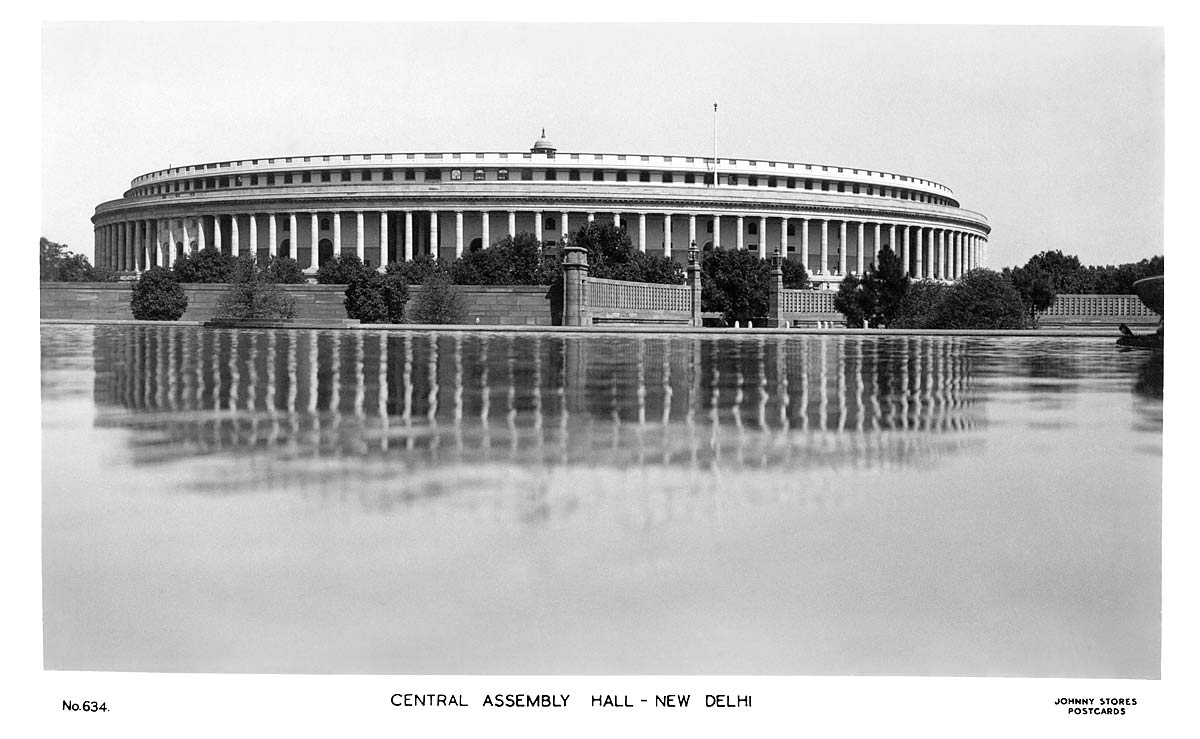
- Council chamber, Council House, Raisina Hill, New Delhi

The Council of State was the upper house of the legislature for British India (the Imperial Legislative Council) created by the Government of India Act 1919 from the old Imperial Legislative Council, implementing the Montagu–Chelmsford Reforms. The Central Legislative Assembly was the lower house.

As a result of Indian independence, the Council of State was dissolved on 14 August 1947 and its place taken by the Constituent Assembly of India and the Constituent Assembly of Pakistan.

The Council of State used to meet at the Metcalfe House. The Viceroy or Governor-General was its ex officio President.

== Composition ==
=== 1919 to 1937 ===
The Council of States was created by the Government of India Act 1919. As per this Act, the Council was to have 60 members. The composition was as follows:

- Members nominated by the Governor-General (26)
  - Officials (20)
  - Non-officials (6), one of whom was nominated as the result of an election held in Berar.
- Elected members (34) from the provinces of British India:
  - General (20): Madras (4), Bombay (3), Bengal (3), United Provinces (3), Punjab (1), Bihar & Orissa (3), Central Provinces (1), Burma (1), Assam (1)
  - Muslim (10): Madras (1), Bombay (2), Bengal (2), United Provinces (2), Punjab (2), Bihar & Orissa (1)
  - Chamber of Commerce (3): Bombay, Bengal, Burma
  - Sikh (1)

The province-wise composition was as follows:

- Madras (5): General (4), Muslim (1)
- Bombay (6): General (3), Muslim (2) (Bombay, Sind), Bombay Chamber of Commerce (1)
- Bengal (6): General (3) (East Bengal, West Bengal (2)), Muslim (2) (East Bengal, West Bengal), Bengal Chamber of Commerce (1)
- United Provinces (5): General (3) (Central, Northern, Southern), Muslim (2) (West, East)
- Punjab (4): General (1), Muslim (2) (East, West), Sikh (1)
- Bihar & Orissa (4): General (3), Muslim (1)
- Central Provinces (1): General
- Burma (2): General (1), Burma Chamber of Commerce (1)
- Assam (1): General in rotation with Muslim

The Muslim seats of Punjab together with one General seat of Bihar and Orissa alternated to elect 2 seats for every Council of State.

The members had a tenure of 5 years. There were no women members.

The elected members were voted from an electorate consisting of persons who fulfilled either condition

- Paid a certain sum as annual income tax or annual land revenue
- Member of the Senate of any University
- Experience in any Legislative Council in India or
- Title-holder

This electorate consisted of not more than 17,000 of entire population of 24 crores (240,000,000) in 1920.

Like the Legislative Assembly, the Council of State had no members elected to represent the princely states, as they were not part of British India. On 23 December 1919, when King-Emperor George V gave royal assent to the Government of India Act 1919, he also made a proclamation which created the Chamber of Princes, to provide a forum for the states to use to debate national questions and make their collective views known to the Government of India.

=== 1937 to 1947 ===
The Government of India Act 1935 introduced further reforms. The size of the Council of State was to be increased to 260 members, 156 from the provinces and 104 from the princely states. However, the first election to the federal legislature after that of 1934 was the 1945 Indian general election, in which the princely states continued to take no part.

== Members of First Council of State (1921) ==
=== Nominated ===
- Officials: General Lord Rawlinson
- Non-Officials: Sir Dinshaw Edulji Wacha (Bombay), G. A. Natesan (Madras), Sir Leslie Creery Miller (Madras), Soshi Kanta Acharya of Mymensingh (Bengal), Sir Mohamed Muzamilullah Khan of Bhikampur (United Provinces), Sir Amiruddeen Ahmed Khan of Loharu (Punjab), Sardar Charanjit Singh (Punjab), Harnam Singh (Punjab, Indian Christian), Sir Muhammad Rafique (Delhi) Sir Purshotamdas Thakurdas (Bombay 1923)
- Berar Representative: G. S. Khaparde

=== Elected ===
- Assam: Chandradhar Barua
- Bengal: Sir Benode Chandra Mitter (West Bengal Non-Muhammadan), Sir Deva Prasad Sarvadhikary (West Bengal Non-Muhammadan), Raja Pramatha Nath Ray of Dighapatia (East Bengal Non-Muhammadan), Haji Chowdhuri Mohammad Ismail Khan (West Bengal Muslim), Maulvi Abdul Karim (East Bengal Muslim),
- Bihar & Orissa: Rameshwar Singh of Darbhanga (Non-Muhammadan), Keshav Prasad Singh of Dumraon (Non-Muhammadan), Babu Ramashray Prashad Choudhary of Dalsinghsarai (Non-Muhammadan), Saiyid Zahir-ud-din (Muhammadan),
- Bombay: Lalubhai Samaldas (Non-Muhammadan), Vaman Govind Kale (Non-Muhammadan), Pheroze Sethna (Non-Muhammadan), Raghunath Pandurang Karandikar (Non-Muhammadan), Ebrahim Haroon Jaffer (Bombay Presidency Muhammadan), Ali Baksh Muhammad Hussain (Sind Muhammadan), Ghulam Muhammad Khan Bhurgri (Sind Muhammadan), Sir Arthur Froom (Bombay Chamber of Commerce)
- Burma: Maung Bo Pye (Non-European), Sir Edgar Holberton (Commerce)
- Central Provinces: Maneckji Byramji Dadabhoy (Non-Muhammadan)
- Madras: K. V. Rangaswamy Iyengar (Non-Muhammadan), V. S. Srinivasa Sastri (Non-Muhammadan), S. Rm. M. Annamalai Chettiar (Non-Muhammadan), V. Ramabadra Naidu (Non-Muhammadan), Ahmed Tamby Maricair (Muhammadan)
- Punjab: Lala Ram Saran Das (Non-Muhammadan), Sir Malik Umar Hayat Khan (West Punjab Muhammadan), Zulfikar Ali Khan (Muhammadan), Jogendra Singh (Sikh)
- United Provinces: Raja Sir Rampal Singh (UP Central Non-Muhammadan) Lala Sukhbir Sinha (UP Northern Non-Muhammadan), Raja Moti Chand (UP Southern Non-Muhammadan), Nawab Muhammad Abdul Majid (UP West Muhammadan), Saiyid Raza Ali (UP East Muhammadan)
- Other: Manindra Chandra Nandy Maharaja of Cossimbazar, Ganganath Jha, E. M. Cook, Denys Bray, H. D. Craik, B. C. Mitter, J. A. Richey, B. N. Sarma, J. R. Wood, Sevasila Vedamurti

== Members of Second Council of State (1926) ==
=== Nominated ===
- Officials: Field Marshal Lord Birdwood (Commander-in-Chief), Sir Muhammad Habibullah (Member for Education, Health and Lands), Satish Ranjan Das (Law Member), Major General Sir Robert Charles MacWatt (Director General, Indian Medical Service), David Thomas Chadwick (Commerce Secretary), Arthur Cecil McWatters (Finance Secretary), James Crerar (Home Secretary), Arthur Herbert Ley (Secretary for Industries and Labour), John Perronet Thompson (Political Secretary), James Alexander Richey (Educational Commissioner for the Government of India), Sir Clement Hindley (Chief Commissioner, Railways), Thomas Emerson (Bengal), Kiran Chandra De (Bengal), John Austen Hubback (Bihar and Orissa), D. Weston (Bihar and Orissa), Evelyn Robins Abbott (Delhi), Sir Charles George Todhunter (Madras), H. A. B. Vernon (Madras), Dewan Tek Chand (Punjab), A. Latifi (Punjab), Pandit Shyam Bihari Misra (United Provinces), John Ernest Buttery Hotson (Bombay), G. W. Hatch (Bombay)
- Non-Officials: Keshav Chandra Roy (Bengal), Sir Bijoy Chand Mahtab (Bengal), Prince Afsar-ul-Mulk Mirza Muhammad Akram Hussain (Bengal), Sir Dinshaw Edulji Wacha (Bombay), Raja Sir Harnam Singh (Punjab), Sardar Charanjit Singh (Punjab)(Indian Christians), Sir Malik Umar Hayat Khan (Punjab), Raja Nawab Ali Khan (United Provinces), Raja Ramakrishna Ranga Rao of Bobbili (Madras), G. A. Natesan (Madras), Major Nawab Mahomed Akbar Khan (North- West Frontier Province), Maneckji Byramji Dadabhoy (Central Provinces), G. S. Khaparde (Berar)

=== Elected members ===
- Assam: Khan Bahadur Ghulam Mustafa Chaudhury (Muhammadan), Zaminder Bhatipara Estate, founding member of All India Muslim League, active participant of Islamic Khelafat Andolon, philanthropist, legislator of Assam Legislative Council
- Bengal: Lokenath Mukherjee (West Bengal Non-Muhammadan), Rai Bahadur Nalini Nath Seth (West Bengal Non-Muhammadan), Mahmood Suhrawardy (West Bengal Muhammadan), Maulvi Abdul Karim (East Bengal Muhammadan), John William Anderson Bell (Bengal Chamber of Commerce), G. C. Godfrey (Bengal Chamber of Commerce)
- Bihar & Orissa: Rameshwar Singh (Non-Muhammadan), Anugrah Narayan Sinha (Non-Muhammadan), Babu Ramashray Prasad Choudhary of Dalsinghsarai (Non-Muhammadan), Shah Muhammad Zubair (Muhammadan)
- Bombay: Pheroze Sethna (Non-Muhammadan), Ratansi D. Morarji (Non-Muhamaddan), Manmohandas Ramji Vora (Non-Muhammadan), Ebrahim Haroon Jaffer (Muhammadan), Mian Ali Baksh Muhammad Hussain (Sind Muhammadan), Sir Arthur Froom (Bombay Chamber of Commerce)
- Burma: Pundi Chetlur Desika Chari (General), Sir Edgar Holberton (Burma Chamber of Commerce), W. A. Gray (Burma Chamber of Commerce)
- Central Provinces: Seth Govind Das (General)
- Madras: Saiyed Mohamad Padshah Sahib Bahadur (Muhammadan), Dr. U. Rama Rao (Non-Muhammadan) (Swaraj), V. Ramadas Pantulu (Non-Muhammadan), Sir C. Sankaran Nair (Non-Muhammadan), S. Rm. M. Annamalai Chettiar (Non-Muhammadan)
- Punjab: Lala Ram Saran Das (Punjab Non-Muhammadan), Nawab Sahibzada Sayad Mohammad Mehr Shah (East and West Punjab Muhammadan), Sardar Shivdev Singh Uberoi (Punjab Sikh)
- United Provinces: Munshi Narayan Prasad Asthana (United Provinces Northern Non-Muhammadan), Raja Moti Chand (United Provinces Southern Non-Muhammadan), Prakash Narain Sapru (United Provinces Southern Non-Muhammadan), Raja Sir Rampal Singh (United Provinces Central Non-Muhammadan), Saiyid Alay Nabi (United Provinces West Muhammadan), Maharaja Sir Muhammad Ali Muhamamd Khan (United Provinces East Muhammadan), Nawab Sir Muhammad Muzammil-ullah Khan (United Provinces West Muhammadan), Sukhbir Sinha
- Other: Madhav Shrihari Aney, Hussain Imam, Syed Muhammad Padshah, Raja Yuvaraj Dutta Singh, Srinarain Mehta

== Members of Third Council of State (1930–1936) ==
=== Nominated ===
- Government of India:
- Officials from Provinces: A de C. Williams, Sir Guthrie Russell, T. M. Dow (Bengal), E. F. Thomas (Madras), Gurusaday Dutt
- Non-Officials: G. S. Khaparde (Berar), Khwaja Habibullah (Bengal), Maharaja Jagadish Nath Ray (Bengal), Pandit Gokaran Nath Agra (United Provinces), Shaikh Magbul Husain (United Provinces), Raja Charanjit Singh (Punjab), Nawab Malik Mohammad Hayat Khan Noon (Punjab), Major Nawab Sir Mahomed Akbar Khan (NWFP), Maharaja Kameshwar Singh of Darbhanga (Bihar), Khan Bahadur Shams-ud-din Haidar (Bihar), Sir Nasarvanji Choksy (Bombay), Sir Josna Ghosal (Bombay)

=== Elected members ===
- Assam: Khan Bahadur Ghulam Mustafa Chaudhury (Muhammadan), Zaminder Bhatipara Estate, founding member of All India Muslim League, active participant of Islamic Khelafat Andolon, philanthropist, legislator of Assam Legislative Council
- Bengal: Jagadish Chandra Banerjee (East Bengal Non-Muhammadan), Nripendra Narayan Sinha (West Bengal Non-Muhammadan), Satyendra Chandra Ghose Maulik (West Bengal Non-Muhammadan), Mahmood Suhrawardy (West Bengal Muhammadan), Syed Abdul Hafeez (East Bengal Muhammadan), George Campbell (Bengal Chamber of Commerce)
- Bihar & Orissa: Babu Ramashray Prashad Choudhary of Dalshinghsarai (Non-Muhammadan), Hussain Imam (Muhammadan)
- Bombay: Sardar Shri Jagannath Maharaj Pandit (Non-Muhammadan), Shantidas Askuran (Non-Muhammadan), Pheroze Sethna (Non-Muhammadan), Sir Suleman Cassum Haji Mitha (Muhammadan), Ali Baksh Muhammad Hussain (Sind Muhammadan), R. H. Parker (Bombay Chamber of Commerce)
- Burma: J. B. Glass (Burma Chamber of Commerce)
- Central Provinces: V. V. Kalikar, Raja Laxmanrao Bhonsle
- Madras: S. Rm. M. Annamalai Chettiar (Non-Muhammadan), Yarlagadda Ranganayakulu Naidu (Non-Muhammadan), V. C. Vellingiri Gounder (Non-Muhammadan), G. N. Chetty (Non-Muhammadan), Syed Muhammad Padshah Saheb Bahadur (Muhammadan),
- Punjab: Lala Ram Saran Das (Non-Muhammadan), Sardar Buta Singh (Sikh), Chaudhri Muhammad Din (East Punjab Muhammadan)
- United Provinces: Lala Mathura Prasad Mehrotra (UP Central Non-Muhammadan), Lala Jagdish Prasad (UP Northern Non-Muhammadan), Prakash Narain Sapru (UP Southern Non-Muhammadan), Hafiz Muhammad Halim (UP West Muhammadan), Shaikh Mushir Hosain Kidwai (UP East Muhammadan)

== Fourth Council of State ==
=== Nominated ===
- Officials: General Sir Claude Auchinleck, Sir Mohammad Usman, Jogendra Singh, Feroz Khan Noon, Sir Satyendranath Roy, C. E. Jones, E. Conran-Smith, G. S. Bozman, Shavax A. Lal, A de C. Williams, N. R. Pillai, Ernest Wood, B. R. Sen
- Non-Officials: Sir David Devadoss (Madras), K. Ramunni Menon (Madras), Sir Josna Ghosal (Bengal), Maneckji Dadabhoy (Bombay), Raja Charanjit Singh (Punjab), Shamsuddin Haidar (Bihar), Brijlal Nandlal Biyani (Berar), A. P. Patro, Rahimtoola Chinoy, Satyendra Kumar Das, Sir Satya Charan Mukherjee, Sir Mohammad Yakub, Sardar Nihal Singh, Khurshid Ali Khan, Lt. Col. Sir S. Hissam-ud-din Bahadur, Sobha Singh, Sri Narain Mehta, Mohendra Lal Das,

=== Elected members ===
- Assam: Khan Bahadur Ghulam Mustafa Chaudhury (Muhammadan), Zaminder Bhatipara Estate, founding member of All India Muslim League, active participant of Islamic Khelafat Andolon, philanthropist, legislator of Assam Legislative Council
- Bengal: Kumarsankar Ray Chaudhury (East Bengal Non-Muhammadan), Kumar Nripendra Narayan Sinha (West Bengal Non-Muhammadan), Susil Kumar Roy Chowdhury (West Bengal Non-Muhammadan)
- Bihar: Maharaja Kameshwar of Darbhanga (Non-Muhammadan), Babu Ramashray Prashad Choudhary of Dalshinghsarai (Non-Muhammadan), Hussain Imam (Muhammadan)
- Bombay: Shantidas Askuran (Non-Muhammadan), Govindalal Shivlal Motilal (Non-Muhammadan), Maneckji Nadirshaw Dalal (Non-Muhammadan), Sir Suleman Cassum Haji Mitha (Muhammadan), R. H. Parker (Bombay Chamber of Commerce)
- Central Provinces: V. V. Kalikar (General)
- Madras: Rao Bahadur K. Govindachari (Non-Muhammadan), M. Ct. M. Chidambaram Chettyar (Non-Muhammadan), Narayandas Girdhardas (Non-Muhammadan), V. Ramadas Pantulu (Non-Muhammadan), Saiyad Mohamed Sahib Bahadur (Muhammadan)
- Orissa: Nikunja Kishore Das (Non-Muhammadan),
- Punjab: Lala Ram Saran Das (Non-Muhammadan), Chaudhri Ataullah Khan Tarar (East & West Punjab Muhammadan), Sardar Buta Singh (Sikh)
- Sind: Ali Buksh Mohammad Hussain (Muhammadan)
- United Provinces: H. N. Kunzru (UP Northern Non-Muhammadan), Prakash Narain Sapru (UP Southern Non-Muhammadan), Haji Syed Mohamed Husain (UP West Muhammadan), Chaudhri Niamatullah (UP East Muhammadan)

== Presidents ==
- Sir Henry Moncrieff Smith (1924)
- Sir Montagu Sherard Dawes Butler (1924–1925)
- Sir Maneckji Byramji Dadabhoy (1933–1936; 1937–1946)
- Syed Hussain Imam (1947)

== See also ==
- Central Legislative Assembly
- Viceroy's Executive Council
- Imperial Legislative Council
- Interim Government of India
- Elections
  - 1920 Indian general election
  - 1923 Indian general election
  - 1926 Indian general election
  - 1930 Indian general election
  - 1934 Indian general election
  - 1945 Indian general election
