= Syed Hussain Imam =

Indian and Pakistani politician from Bihar (1897–1985)

- سید حسین امام
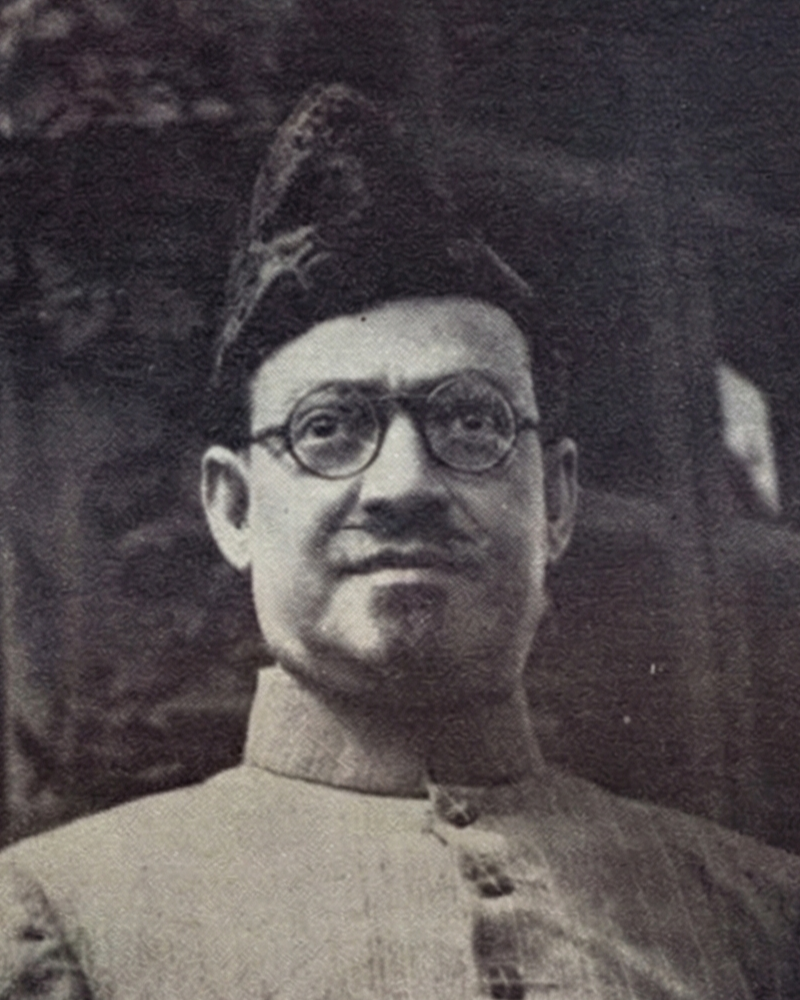
- Syed Hussain Imam

President of the Council of State
- In office January 1947 (Note: Wavell wrote to Rajendra Prasad on 26 January 1947 that "on his recommendation I had in fact already decided to appoint Mr. Hossain Imam", and the intention was reported from New Delhi the same day; The Indian Annual Register places the appointment in January 1947. The appointment was to be notified in a Gazette Extraordinary, and that notification has not been traced in any digitised holding. He presided over the budget session that opened on 17 February 1947.) – August 1947 (Note: No source located records the date on which he left the office. The Council of State was dissolved on 14 August 1947.)
- Preceded by: Sir Maneckji Dadabhoy
- Succeeded by: Office abolished

Member of the Council of State
- In office 1931–1947
- Constituency: Bihar and Orissa (Muhammadan)

Member of the Constituent Assembly of India
- In office 1946–1950
- Constituency: Bihar (Muslim seats)

Member of the Provisional Parliament
- In office 1950–1951
- Constituency: Bihar

Personal details
- Born: 21 February 1897 Gaya, Bengal Presidency, British India
- Died: 16 January 1985 (aged 87) Karachi, Pakistan
- Party: All-India Muslim League

Syed Hussain Imam (21 February 1897 – 16 January 1985), who appears in the official record of his lifetime as Hussain Imam and in the Indian parliamentary record as Abu Abdullah Saiyid Hussain Imam, was an Indian politician from Gaya in Bihar and a leader of the All-India Muslim League.

Imam sat in the Council of State, the upper house of the Indian legislature, from 1931 until its dissolution in 1947, representing the Bihar and Orissa (Muhammadan) constituency. He founded the Council's Progressive Party in 1932 and was its deputy leader, and by 1936 was leading the opposition in the house; by 1941 he led the Muslim League party in it. In that capacity he was one of the twenty-two delegates to the Simla Conference convened by the Viceroy, Lord Wavell, in June 1945. He was received by the Cabinet Mission in April 1946 and by Lord Mountbatten in April 1947. In January 1947 Wavell decided to appoint him President of the Council of State in succession to Sir Maneckji Dadabhoy.

His legislative work was largely economic and financial. He moved in the Council of State the bill that became the Muslim Personal Law (Shariat) Application Act, 1937; drafted three bills of his own, including one to place the principal mosques of Delhi under an elected committee; signed three published minutes of dissent on the bills constituting the Reserve Bank of India and the Imperial Bank of India; and in 1935 moved and carried a resolution enfranchising women for elections to the Council.

Within the Muslim League he moved resolutions from the Allahabad session of December 1930 onwards, was a member of the Working Committee from 1941, one of the three members of its Central Parliamentary Board from 1943, and president of the Bihar Provincial Muslim League from 1945 to 1947.

Elected to the Constituent Assembly of India from Bihar in 1946, Imam remained in India after partition. He sat on its Panel of Chairmen and presided over sittings of the house, signed the Constitution of India in January 1950, and continued in the Indian parliament until 1951, when he migrated to Pakistan. In Pakistan he presided over the East African Muslim Conference at Nairobi in December 1953 and chaired a Government of Pakistan fact-finding committee on handlooms that reported in 1956. He died in Karachi in 1985.

== Early life and education ==
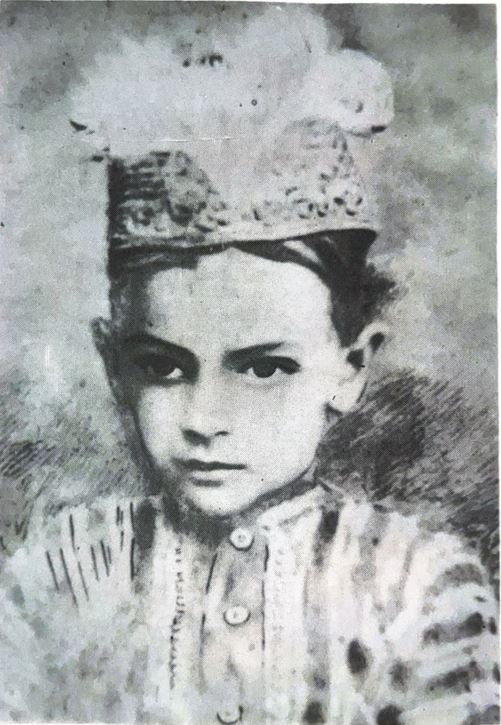
Imam as a child

Hussain Imam was born on 21 February 1897 at Gaya, then in the Bengal Presidency and from 1912 in the province of Bihar and Orissa. He was the son of Haji Syed Ali Imam. (Note: The official Who's Who of 1950, compiled from particulars supplied by members themselves, records only "S. of late Haji Syed Ali Imam". He is not to be confused with Sir Syed Ali Imam (1869–1932), the Law Member of the Viceroy's Executive Council, who was born at Neora near Patna and was the son of Syed Imdad Imam Khan.) The same source records that he was educated privately, that he married in 1916, and that he was "for some time Municipal Commissioner, Gaya"; his permanent address is given as "Hussain Manzil", Gaya. (Note: Imam's own letters to Jinnah between 1941 and 1946 are written on the letterhead of "Hasnain Manzil", Gaya, variously transcribed by the editors of the Jinnah Papers as Hasanain and Husnain. The contemporary Indian Year Book entry of 1938–39 also gives "Hasnain Manzil".) He had a brother, Syed Hasan Imam, a poet and writer in Urdu, who died at Karachi on 23 April 1961.

A contemporary "Who's Who in India" entry published in The Indian Year Book for 1938–39 states that he went to England in 1913 and joined the Imperial College of Science, but was recalled in 1915; that he afterwards studied agriculture at the Sabour Institution, the agricultural college at Sabour, near Bhagalpur; that he "took no active interest in politics up to 1928"; and that he was elected to the Council of State in September 1930. (Note: The September 1930 election and the taking of his seat at the session that opened on 10 February 1931 are distinct events, and appear to account for the "1930" given as the start of his legislative service by the 1950 Who's Who and by later accounts.)

According to the biography of Imam published by Arshad Syed Karim in 1992, he first learned Urdu, Persian and Arabic at home and was sent with his brother to school at Barh; he was admitted in 1909 to the collegiate school attached to the Muhammadan Anglo-Oriental College at Aligarh; he went to England in March 1913 and entered Imperial College in 1914, returning to India early in 1915 after the outbreak of the First World War; he took part in the Home Rule and Khilafat movements and managed his family's landholdings; and his wife was a granddaughter of Mr Justice Sharfuddin. Karim's account of the London years agrees with the 1938–39 Year Book as to the college and, within a year, as to the dates; the schooling at Aligarh has not been confirmed from an independent source, and the 1950 Who's Who names no school or college. (Note: Karim's book carries no footnotes, bibliography or index.)

== Council of State ==
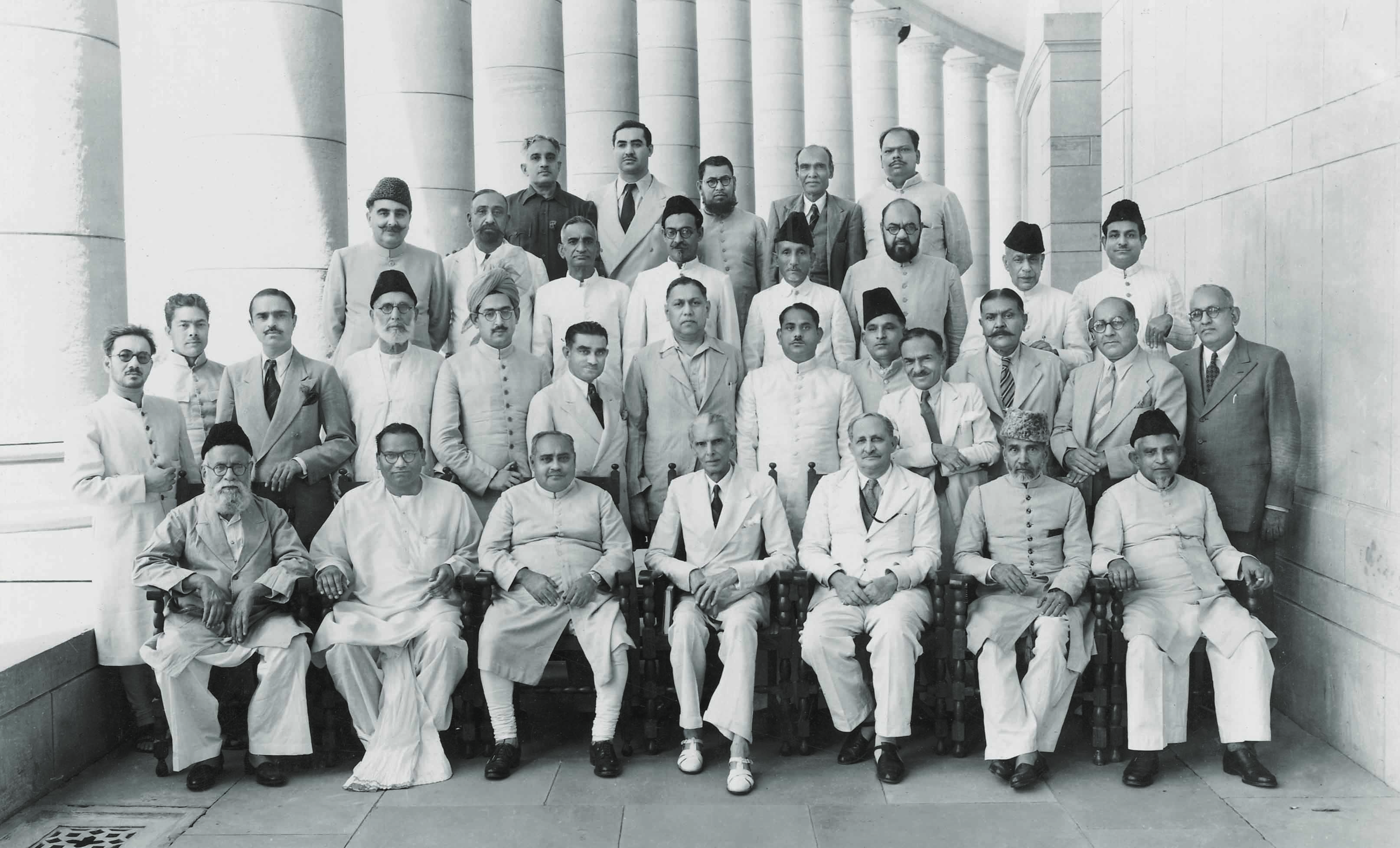
Muslim League leaders in the corridor of the Central Legislative Assembly, New Delhi, 1946

=== Election and first session ===
Imam was elected to the Council of State for the Bihar and Orissa (Muhammadan) constituency in September 1930 and took his seat at the session that opened at New Delhi on 10 February 1931, when the newly constituted Council met and forty-seven new members were sworn in. On 11 February, the day after he was sworn in, he asked the house to "overlook the shortcomings of a new Member" and moved a resolution that it "does not favour indirect election for the Council of State", urging that the existing electorate be retained and proposing that the house be enlarged to 120 members, of whom 80 should be elected. He observed that all the provincial governments but one or two had recommended direct election, and that the Government of India had accepted indirect election "merely out of deference for the Simon Commission".

Within a fortnight he had also moved for a committee of seven members of both chambers to advise the Government on its loan operations; for a boundaries commission on the amalgamation with Bihar of the permanently settled districts of the United Provinces and Bengal lying on its border; and for a committee of experts and legislators to frame a scheme for the Indianisation of the Indian Army. In the same year he moved for a retrenchment committee on the model of the Geddes Committee and for an inquiry into the working of the Tata Iron and Steel Company, both of which he withdrew. He was appointed to one of the Government of India's Retrenchment Committees in 1931, a membership he recalled in the Indian parliament in 1948.

He remained a member of the Council for the rest of its existence. He is listed for the same constituency in The Indian Year Book for 1937–38 and in that work's member rolls from 1932–33 to 1946; he is styled M.C.S.—Member of the Council of State—in the Muslim League's official publications through to 1943; and he is described by Jinnah in June 1946 as "Member, Council of State". (Note: The 1950 Who's Who describes his legislative service instead as "Member, Bihar Legislative Assembly, 1930—47" and as "Leader, Muslim League Party, Bihar, till 1947". No record of membership of a Bihar legislature has been found, and the dates coincide exactly with his service in the Council of State, of which he was leader of the Muslim League party. The entries in that volume were compiled from particulars supplied by members themselves.)

=== Economic and financial legislation ===
His parliamentary work was largely economic and financial, ranging over the Reserve Bank of India Bill, tariff and textile protection, successive finance and income-tax bills, company law, public borrowing, the silver holdings of the Paper Currency Reserve and the condition of agriculturists. In 1933 he sat on the joint committees of both houses on the Reserve Bank of India Bill and the Imperial Bank of India Bill, and signed three published minutes of dissent on their reports.

On the Reserve Bank Bill he joined eight other members in a minute seeking directors elected by the chambers of commerce and the provincial co-operative banks, local boards, and "preference in allotment to small subscribers", and added a minute of his own in seven numbered points. In it he proposed dividing the Bank's capital into shares of one hundred rupees reserved to Indian subjects of the Crown and shares of five hundred rupees open to all, with a maximum of ten votes to any person; objected to the Bank's power to borrow money in India as "an innovation upon central banking practice"; argued for the inclusion of sterling securities among the assets of the Issue Department; proposed that a bank's deposits, and not its capital and reserves alone, should determine whether it was a scheduled bank; and urged that rupee coin be made legal tender only up to one hundred rupees, so as to "popularise notes". On the eighteen-pence ratio he wrote that its maintenance "will be too great a strain for the Bank", and that the Bank's failure "is bound to retard constitutional reform". On the Imperial Bank Bill he signed a minute on the powers of the local boards, and a second, with Nripendranarayan Sinha and Sant Singh, arguing that the Bank should be authorised to lend on the mortgage of immovable property because the position of the land-owning classes in the depression made such relief "highly incumbent upon the legislature".

In 1936 he moved a resolution urging India's withdrawal from the League of Nations, telling the house that India was "like a shareholder in a company and when the managing agents mismanaged the shareholder could only get out of the concern", and citing the failure of disarmament, the conquest of Abyssinia and the working of the mandates. The Government opposed withdrawal; a substitute moved by Sir Phiroze Sethna for a substantial reduction in India's contribution was accepted and carried on 22 September 1936 by 35 votes to none. (Note: The live record of the division is for the resolution as amended by Sethna. The article does not state that the Council resolved on withdrawal.) On 30 March 1936, on the certified Finance Bill—the third certified measure of the year—The Indian Annual Register records that "Mr. Hossain Imam led the Opposition", arguing that "it was far better to abolish the Legislatures than every time impose an Executive decree".

In April 1945, in the debate on the financial settlement between Britain and India, the Congress member Manu Subedar proposed that any commission of enquiry should consist of three opposition leaders from the Legislative Assembly "and probably Mr. Hossain Imam from the Council of State". On 9 November 1944 he moved, unsuccessfully, for a committee of inquiry into the coal industry with power to consider compulsory amalgamation or nationalisation, and on 27 March 1945 the Council passed without division his resolution for the protection of the cotton dyeing and printing cottage industry. In November 1943 he moved that the Council recommend "adequate and generous financial help of at least seven crores to the Government of Bengal" during the famine, telling the house that Bengal was "in the midst of a catastrophe the like of which has never visited any part of India"; the resolution was withdrawn.

=== Civil liberties and constitutional questions ===
In 1931 Imam moved that the Indian Press (Emergency Powers) Bill be referred to a select committee, saying that while he agreed with the principle of the measure he "refused to be a party to the taking away of the liberty of the press". He tabled a series of amendments taken from the dissenting minute of five members of the Legislative Assembly headed by Sir Hari Singh Gour, and sought a new clause providing that on the expiry of the Act any money or property forfeited under it be refunded on application. (Note: The Indian Annual Register prints two different figures for the number of amendments he tabled, on the same page, and no figure is given here.) In April 1932 he opposed the bill providing for the transfer of detenus, saying that detention without trial was unjustifiable on any ground, and in the same year he opposed the Bengal Suppression of Terrorist Outrages Bill on the ground that the Government had not used joint select-committee procedure for a measure "affecting the liberties of the people of a vast country". He supported resolutions for the release of political prisoners and detenus and spoke repeatedly on the condition of the prisoners in the Andamans.

On 18 September 1935 he moved that the Council recommend "to remove the sex disqualification and to enfranchise the women having requisite qualification to vote at the Council of State elections", telling the house that it had "the unenviable distinction of being the only legislative body which makes sex the reason of disqualification for women". The motion was adopted. In March 1936 he supported Sir Ramunni Menon's resolution removing the remaining sex disqualifications for election or nomination to the Council, which passed without a dissentient voice.

He campaigned repeatedly for the procedural rights of the legislature: for government bills to be referred to joint select committees of both chambers, for the Finance Bill to go to a select committee, and for a select committee on the Standing Orders, which he said stifled the discussion of matters of urgent public importance. He asked sustained questions on the representation of Muslims and other minorities in the public services and the judiciary—the paucity of Muslim judges in the High Courts, the communal composition of the gazetted staff of the income-tax, customs and salt departments, and representation in the subordinate railway services. In February 1943 he spoke in the Council on the adjournment motion on Gandhi's fast, setting out the Muslim League party's position; a member of the Legislative Assembly complained there that a newspaper had silently cut that paragraph from the agency report of the day's proceedings while continuing to attribute the report to the agency. In the same volume a member records that the Deputy Commander-in-Chief admitted in the Council of State, in answer to a question by Imam, that a martial-law regulation in Sind made retrospective was without precedent.

=== Bills of his own ===
Three bills drafted by Imam survive in full, with the statements of objects and reasons over his signature, in the reprints of Council of State bills published in The Calcutta Gazette.

The Provident Funds (Amendment) Bill, introduced on 23 September 1931, would have extended the rights of a nominee under the Provident Funds Act to the nominee's heirs where the nominee predeceased the depositor, "to remove the hardship now caused to the heirs of a nominee". The Council declined to take it into consideration in 1932, by 26 votes to 17. The Indian Life Assurance Companies (Amendment) Bill, introduced on 17 March 1932, would have required the whole of the life assurance fund of Indian companies, and a proportionate part of that of foreign companies doing business in India, to be invested in India, with not less than a quarter of the fund in government securities; its purpose, in his words, was "to put a stop to the flight of capital, to ease the exchange, to strengthen the securities, and thereby to facilitate the Government's borrowings".

The Delhi Masajid Bill, introduced on 18 March 1940, would have vested the administration of the Jama Masjid, the Fatehpuri Masjid and the Kalan Masjid of Delhi, and their endowments, in an incorporated "Masajid Committee, Delhi" of twelve members: the imams of the first two mosques or their nominees, members elected by the Muslim members of the Delhi and New Delhi municipal committees and the Delhi district board, two elected by the Muslim members of the Indian Legislature, and three co-opted. It would have replaced the committees constituted under agreements with the Government of 1862 and 1877, set a five-year term in place of tenure for life, required candidates to be able to read and write Urdu, and required an annual published report with accounts audited by a chartered accountant. His statement of objects and reasons said that the mosques and their endowments "have hitherto remained almost exclusively in the hands of persons who were never represented by any democratic principle". A Public and Judicial Department file was opened on the bill at the India Office in April 1940, and on 26 March 1941 the Council referred it to a joint committee of twelve members of both houses; its outcome has not been traced.

=== Muslim personal law ===
On 2 October 1937 Imam moved in the Council of State the bill applying Muslim personal law to Muslims in British India, as it had been passed by the Legislative Assembly, and the Council passed it; the measure became the Muslim Personal Law (Shariat) Application Act, 1937. In 1943 he moved a long series of amendments to the Delhi University (Amendment) Bill, seeking Muslim representation on the university's court, executive and academic councils and among its examiners, and also representation for the Scheduled Classes and for labour, telling the house, "I am a member of the oppressed classes pleading for the depressed classes".

=== Other public appointments ===
Imam was vice-president of the Bihar Earthquake Relief Committee following the earthquake of 1934, and served on the Imperial Council of Agricultural Research from 1937 to 1949, on the Textile Control Board, the All India Handloom Board and the Central Pay Commission; in 1946 he was a director of the Imperial Bank of India. The Indian Year Book for 1938–39, 1939–40 and 1946 names him among the non-ex officio members of the Governing Body of the Imperial Council of Agricultural Research, "elected by the Council of State". In August 1946 the Government of India asked him to go to Copenhagen as an associate to the Indian representative at the second session of the Food and Agriculture Organisation; he referred the invitation to Jinnah, noting that he had declined an invitation to the organisation's first conference at Quebec in 1945 because of the Bihar election, and Jinnah advised him that his presence in India was more important. He was also a member of the executive council of Aligarh Muslim University.

=== Leader of the Muslim League party ===
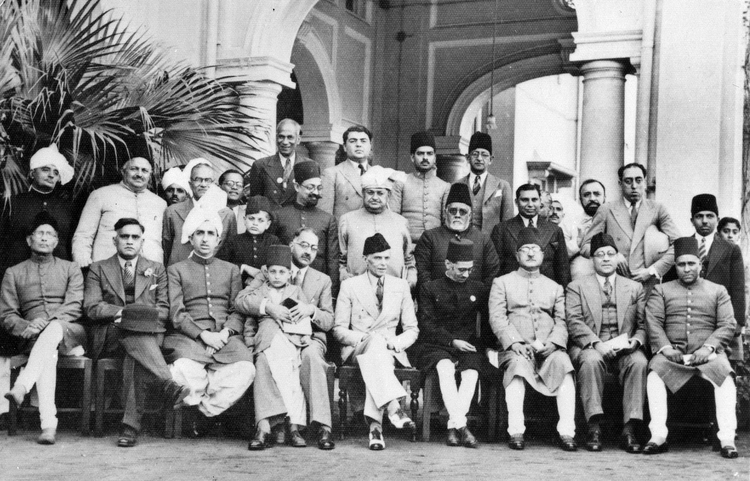
Muslim League leaders after a dinner party at the residence of Mian Bashir Ahmad, Lahore, 1940, with Muhammad Ali Jinnah seated in the centre

According to the 1938–39 Indian Year Book, Imam formed the Progressive Party in the Council of State in March 1932 and was elected its deputy leader, and was re-elected deputy leader in the new Council; the same volume records him as "regarded as an authority on Finance". He is described as deputy leader of the Progressive Party in the debates of 1934 and 1935.

By 1941 he led the Muslim League party in the house. In June of that year the Leader of the House asked him, as its leader, to nominate a member to the Defence Consultative Committee; Imam wrote to Jinnah that "in view of your past attitude towards these shadow affairs, we should not weaken our demand for substance of power by being side-tracked in these petty committees", and Jinnah replied agreeing that "these are only attempts to side-track the main issue". On 11 November 1941 the League members of the Council staged a formal walk-out after a brief statement by him, in which he said that their action was in consonance with the decision of the League party in the Assembly; The Indian Annual Register describes him as "their leader". Lord Wavell, proposing in March 1946 which members of the central legislature the Cabinet Mission should interview, wrote that "from Council of State, I suggest Kunzru (and) Hossain Imam … Hossain Imam leads Moslem League Party". The official documentary edition of British records for the period identifies him as "Leader of the Muslim League Party in the Council of State" and as a member of the Working Committee of the All-India Muslim League.

== All-India Muslim League ==
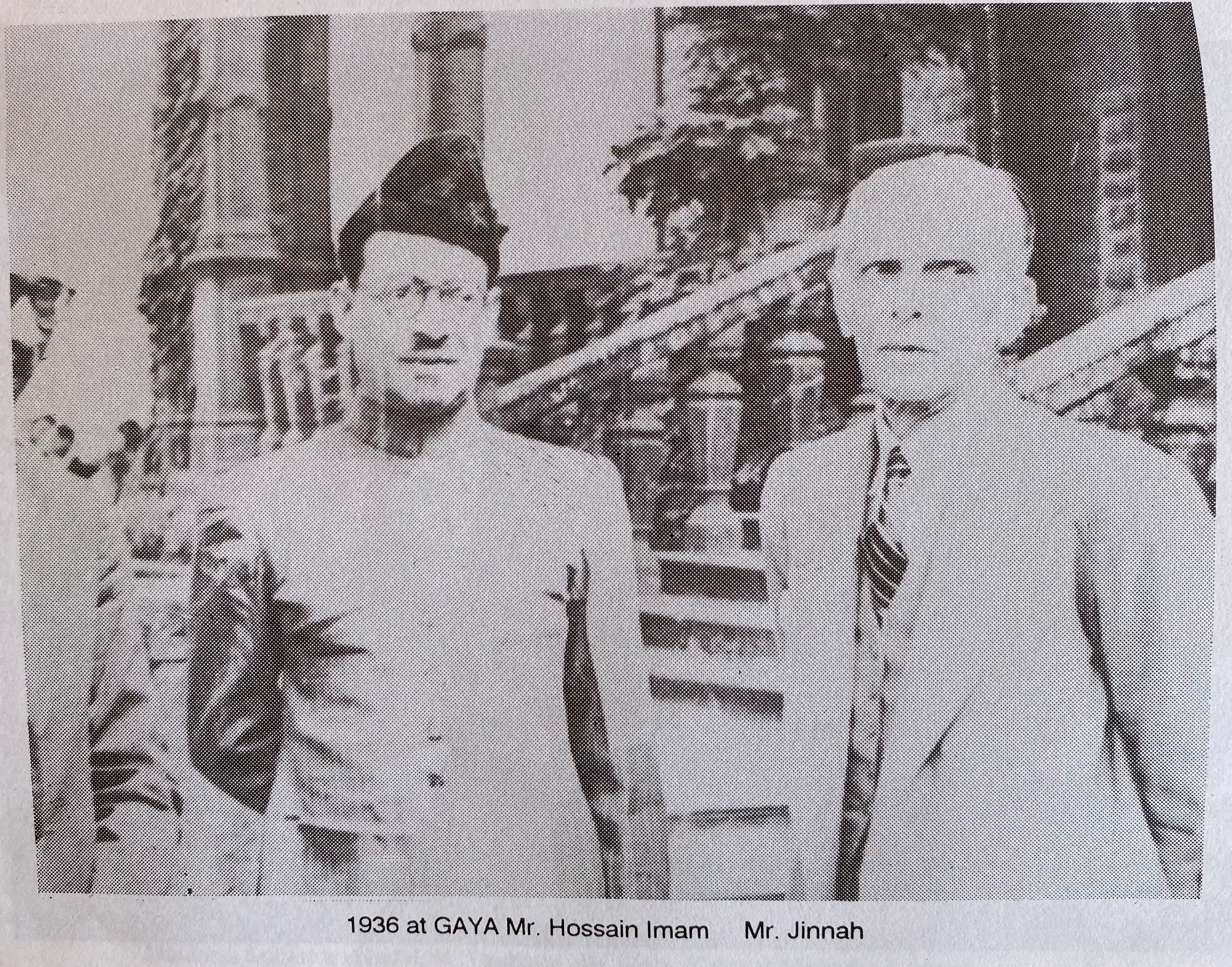
Imam (left) with Muhammad Ali Jinnah at Gaya in 1936

=== Early activity, 1930–1936 ===
Imam's recorded work in the All-India Muslim League begins at its twenty-first annual session at Allahabad on 29 and 30 December 1930—the session at which Muhammad Iqbal delivered his presidential address. He is listed among the delegates arrived from outstations, and moved two of the resolutions recorded: one declaring that the Government of India's despatch on constitutional reforms failed to lead the country towards responsible government, and one, opposed by M. U. S. Jung and carried against his amendment, calling for statutory provision for the adequate representation of Muslims in the cabinets and the public services.

At the League's annual session at New Delhi on 27 December 1931 he spoke on reforms for the North-West Frontier Province, saying that the question "was an All-India demand including that of the Congress". In August 1931 he attended the United Provinces Muslim Conference at Allahabad, presided over by Maulana Shaukat Ali, where the report of those present names him immediately after Jinnah. (Note: He is named in an attendance list; no speech by him at that meeting is reported.) In 1932 he attended meetings of the Council of the League at Delhi, and of the Working Committee and Executive Board of the All-India Muslim Conference at New Delhi under the chairmanship of Sir Muhammad Iqbal, where he moved a resolution seeking twenty per cent of the seats in the Bihar legislature for Muslims on the separation of Orissa.

In 1934 the Council of the League named him to a committee to reconsider and amend the League's constitution, and, in a resolution on the revival and reorganisation of the provincial branches, named him and Maswood Ahmed as the two members requested to undertake that work in Bihar. In 1936 he was named to a four-man committee to revise the League's constitution and rules, and was among those who supported the resolution empowering Jinnah to form a Central Election Board.

=== Sessions and committees ===
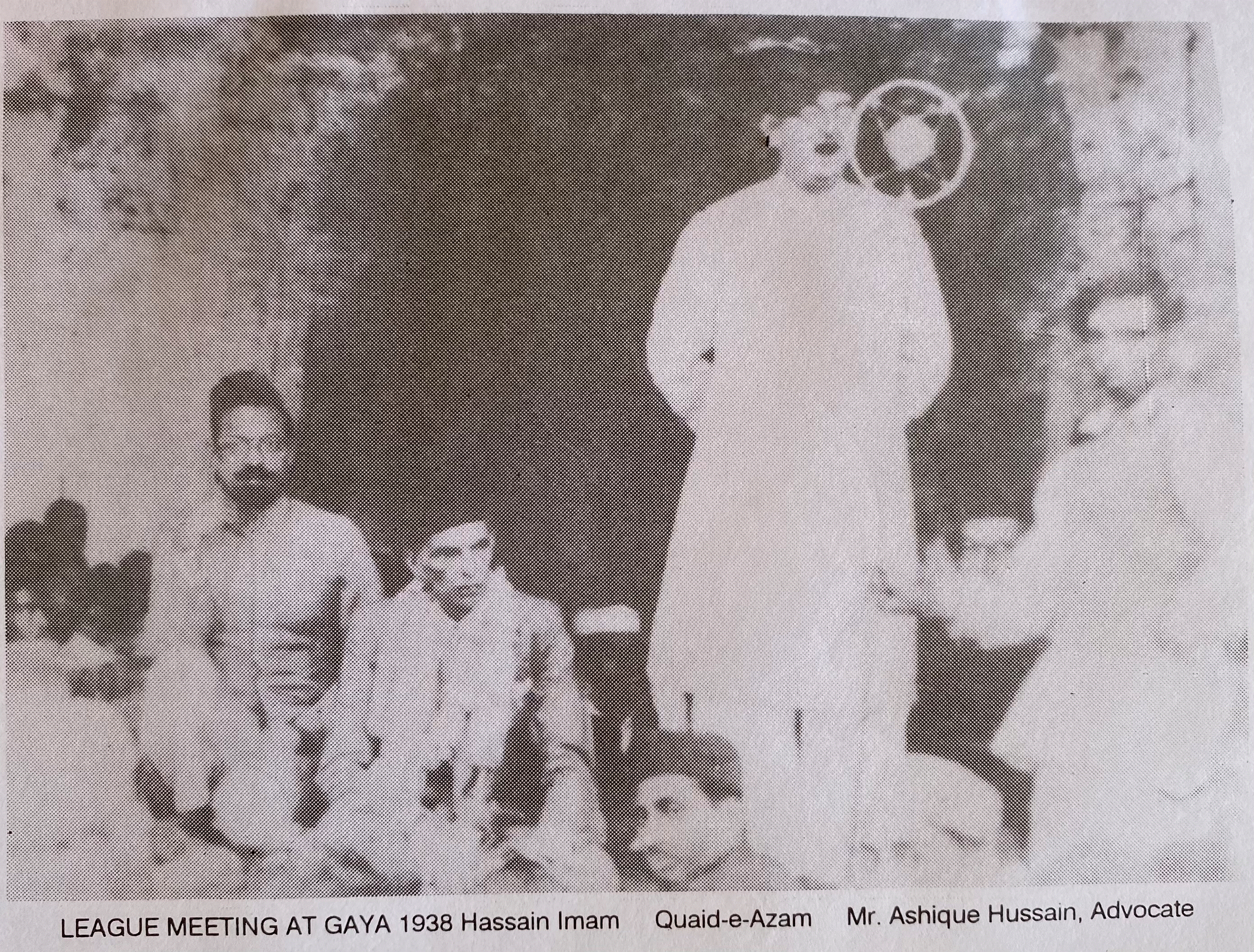
A Muslim League meeting at Gaya in 1938; the photograph's caption names Imam, Jinnah and Ashique Hussain, Advocate

Imam moved or seconded resolutions at successive sessions of the League: on the government's frontier policy in Waziristan at Lucknow in October 1937, in support of the Huq and Saadullah ministries at the special session in Calcutta in April 1938, on the Indian states at Patna in December 1938, and on discrimination against Muslim government employees at Madras in April 1941. Moving the League's resolution against federation under the Government of India Act 1935 at Lucknow on 18 October 1937, he said that the League was opposed to federation because the differences between the constituent units were very marked: "while British India would be represented by those who were ruled, the Indian States would be represented by their rulers".

He served on League committees on the Asansol mosque question, on a programme of economic, social and educational work, on a proposed five-year plan for Muslim advancement, and on the ministerial crisis in Sind, and in 1943 he was appointed one of the auditors of the League's accounts. He was among the speakers at the meeting of the Council of the League at New Delhi on 29 February 1940, three weeks before the Lahore Resolution, which confirmed the Working Committee's resolutions on the war and the constitutional question under Jinnah's chairmanship.

=== Working Committee ===
Imam joined the League's Working Committee in 1941, on the recommendation of the honorary secretary, Liaquat Ali Khan, who wrote to Jinnah on 10 May 1941 proposing that for Bihar "in place of Mr. Shareef, either Syed Hossain Imam, M.C.S. or Nawab Mohamed Ismail" be appointed, because of Shareef's ill health. He attended the committee's meetings at Jinnah's Bombay residence in August 1941. The record of the meeting of 27 October 1941, which considered action against A. K. Fazlul Huq, notes that he "remained neutral"; he had written to Jinnah three days earlier that he was "laid up with renal colic" and unable to attend the meetings of the Working Committee and the Council, and sent instead the advice that "we cannot waste our time in fault-finding and laying it at any one's door". He attended the committee's final meeting of that year at Nagpur under Jinnah's chairmanship, and was reappointed when Jinnah announced a new Working Committee on 31 July 1942. A list of the Working Committee's members supplied by the Government of India's Bureau of Public Information in October 1945 includes "Hossain Imam, Mr (Bihar)". He resigned from the committee on becoming President of the Council of State in 1947.

=== Central Parliamentary Board ===
In 1943 Imam was appointed one of the three members of the League's Central Parliamentary Board, with Liaquat Ali Khan and Chaudhry Khaliquzzaman. Khaliquzzaman, who had moved the resolution constituting the board at the League's Karachi session of December 1943, describes its purpose as being "to supervise the activities of the Legislators of the Muslim provinces, to watch the activities of the Ministers and to nominate candidates for the Legislature wherever necessary", and records that Imam "was also with me all through" the tour of Bengal and Bihar on which League tickets for the elections of 1945–46 were allotted. The board's decisions on candidatures were final, Jinnah declining to hear appeals against them. In December 1944 Sir Ghulam Hussain Hidayatullah, the Premier of Sind, complained to Jinnah that "in spite of Hossain Imam's reporting in favour of my son, the Central Parliamentary Board rejected my son's appeal" over the League nomination for a by-election at Sukkur. (Note: The letter is the account of a father whose son had been passed over; that Imam reported in his favour is asserted by an interested party.)

=== Bihar ===
Imam's League work was centred on Bihar. After communal rioting at Bihar Sharif in 1941 he toured the affected area with an enquiry committee of the Bihar Provincial Muslim League and reported to Jinnah that the ordinary law was "quite ineffective both in checking and in punishing the culprits"; the committee's main demand, he wrote, was that the riot cases be tried by a special tribunal rather than in the ordinary courts, since "invariably Muslim deaths in communal clashes in Bihar Province have gone unavenged in ordinary trials", and he feared that "the 28 Muslims, killed in this riot, will cry in vain for retribution from their murderers". In August 1941 he complained to Jinnah that the provincial government had proscribed the committee's report before it was printed.

After touring the province in November 1945 he wrote to Jinnah that "the League in the province has deteriorated so much that as an organisation it has ceased to exist". He was president of the Bihar Provincial Muslim League by January 1945, and in February 1946, during the provincial elections, wrote to Jinnah that in his absence "the provincial organisation did nothing to make the elections a success", with a seat-by-seat forecast of the Muslim constituencies. Jinnah described him in June 1946 as "President, Provincial Muslim League, Bihar, and Member, Council of State".

During the communal killings in Bihar in November 1946, Wavell flew to Patna and recorded in his journal that among those he received was "Mr Hussein Imam, the local Muslim League leader", who "was in a high state of indignation, demanding strong action, machine-gunning of crowds from the air, dismissal of the Government". Wavell, who described the violence as "an outbreak of savagery and bestiality even worse than the Calcutta killings" in which "the victims are all Muslims", wrote that there was little he could do to influence events, that he could not turn out the provincial government, and that "machine-gunning from the air is not a weapon one would willingly use, though the Muslims point out, rather embarrassingly, that we did not hesitate to use it in 1942".

After the 1946 Bihar riots Jinnah appointed a Central Muslim League Bihar Relief Committee, on which Imam served under the chairmanship of Khawaja Nazimuddin. On 14 June 1947 Jinnah wrote to him that it was "very sad indeed that the Central Bihar Relief Committee appointed by me has done nothing to face the situation and handle the matter as they should have done", and pressed him to convene it. On 17 June, forwarding the committee's recommendations for government action, Imam replied that circumstances had prevented a meeting, that "I regret that I should have failed in the task assigned to me", and tendered his resignation from the committee.

== Simla Conference, 1945 ==
Newsreel footage of the Simla Conference, 1945

In a broadcast on 14 June 1945 Wavell announced that he would invite to Viceregal Lodge the provincial premiers, "the Leader of the Congress Party and the Deputy Leader of the Muslim League in the Central Assembly; the leader of the Congress Party and the Muslim League in the Council of State", the leaders of the Nationalist Party and the European Group, Gandhi and Jinnah, and representatives of the Scheduled Castes and the Sikhs. Imam was accordingly invited as leader of the League party in the Council of State, and his name appears among the twenty-two delegates in the list prepared by the Viceroy's Private Office.

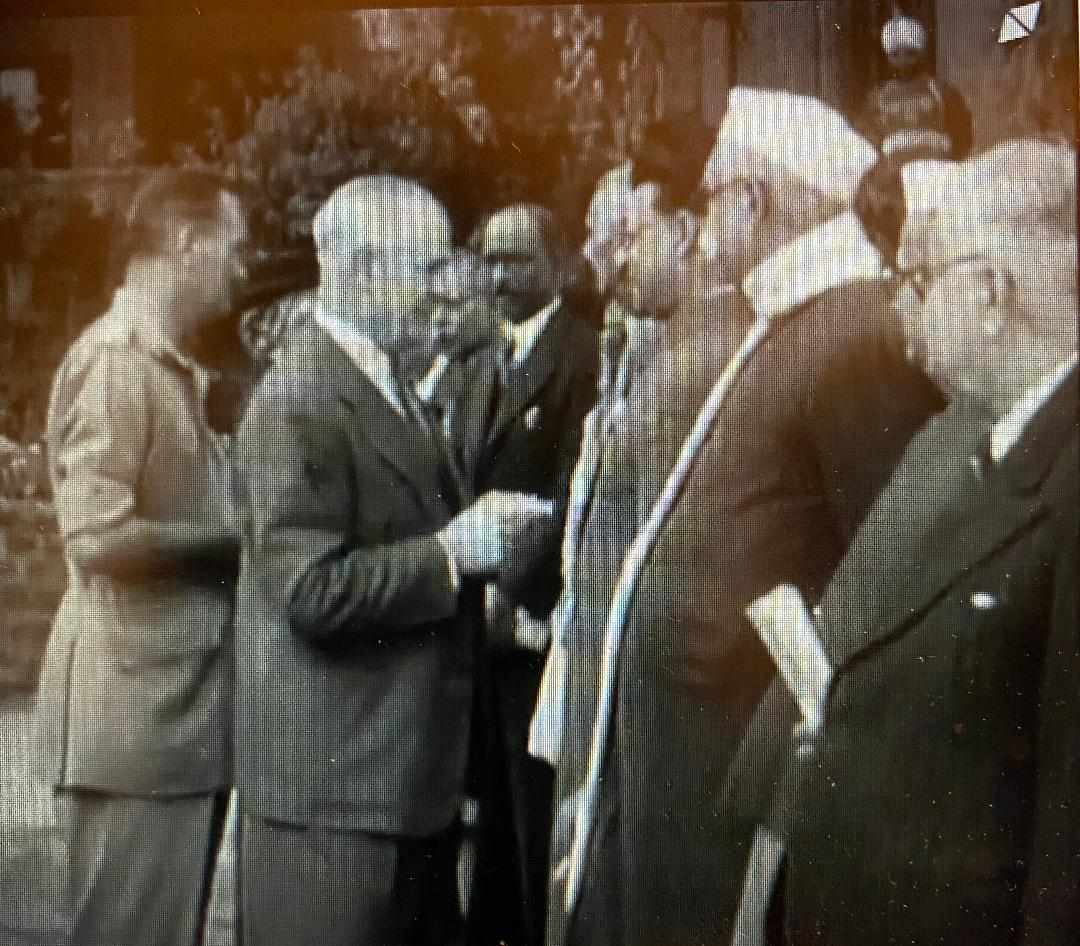
Lord Wavell with delegates at Simla, 1945

Wavell reported to the Secretary of State for India on 15 June that an acceptance had been received from Imam, and on 16 June that Imam had intimated that "his acceptance is subject to Moslem League participation". The conference met on 25 June and broke down on 14 July. In an account of it written for King George VI on 19 July 1945, Wavell described the seating and gave a sketch of each delegate; of Imam, who sat on the League side beyond Liaquat Ali Khan, he wrote: "Mr. Hussein Imam, the League Leader in the Council of State, sat beyond him; I should say that he had little ability or character."

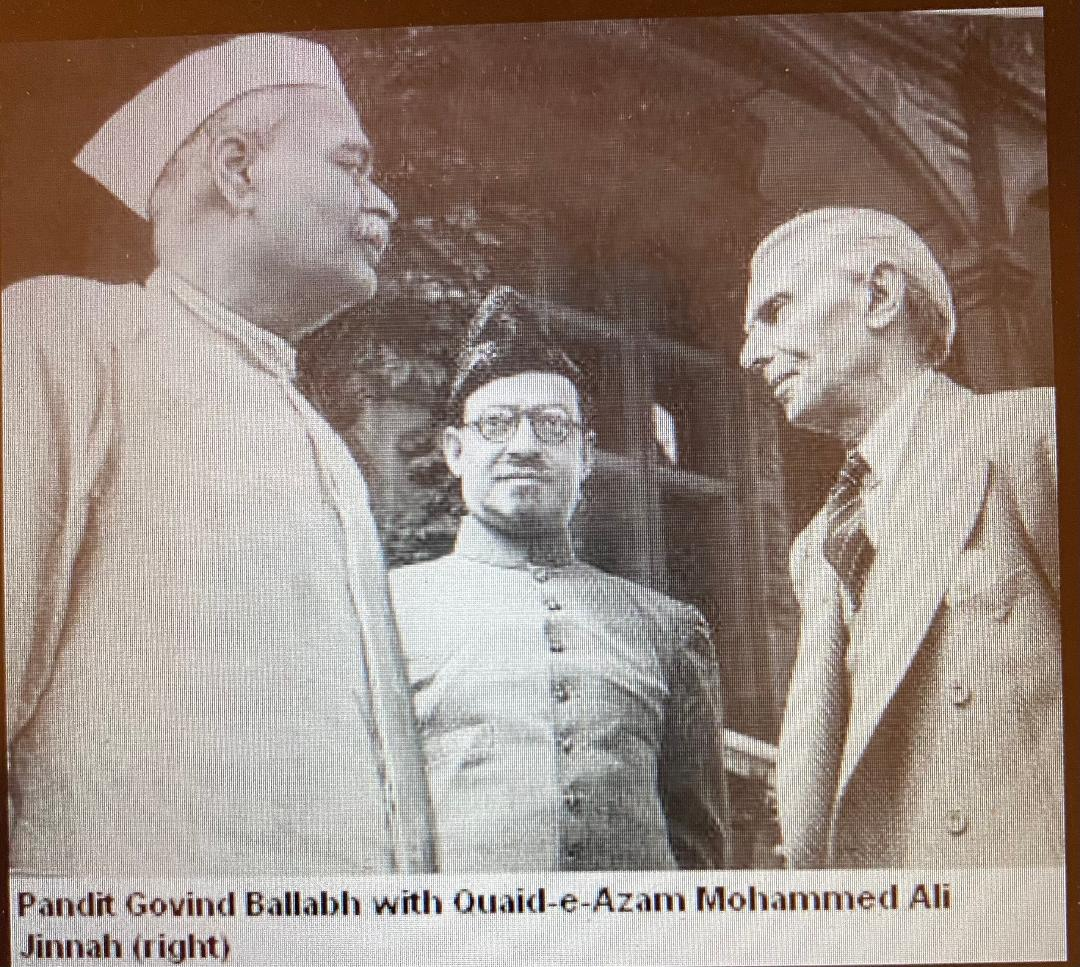
Govind Ballabh Pant (left) with Jinnah (right) at Simla, 1945

Karim's biography reproduces a photograph captioned as showing Imam at the conference with Wavell, Master Tara Singh, Jinnah, Pandit Shukla and Sir Ghulam Hussain Hidayatullah. (Note: The caption is the one printed in Karim's book. His attendance at the conference does not rest on it: it is established by the delegate list, the two acceptance telegrams and Wavell's report to the King.)

== Cabinet Mission, 1946 ==
Imam was received by the Cabinet Mission and the Viceroy on 12 April 1946, on the same day as P. J. Griffiths, leader of the European Group, Sarat Chandra Bose and Pandit H. N. Kunzru. He argued that Muslims would not obtain a fair deal without Pakistan; pressed by Lord Pethick-Lawrence on what would then become of the Muslim minority in his own province of Bihar, he replied that they would not be aliens, that "if sovereign States were set up, his community would get better treatment", and that the existence of Pakistan would deter ill-treatment of Muslims elsewhere. He compared the case for separate states to the recognition of small nations in Europe after the First World War. Wavell, who saw the same four men that day, wrote in his journal that Imam was "more French in appearance and gesture than any Indian I have met previously", with "a little imperial on his chin and moustaches à la Napoleon III", and that he "merely repeated Muslim League propaganda". A photograph taken by the Press Information Bureau the same day, and catalogued by the British Library as "Mr Hoosain Imam, Member, Council of State, with press correspondents", forms part of an album of the Cabinet Mission assembled by the India Office's joint publicity officer.

On 19 June 1946 Imam, with I. I. Chundrigar and Abdul Matin Chaudhury, signed a memorandum to the Cabinet Mission arguing that the allocation of seats to Assam in Section C of the proposed Constituent Assembly over-represented non-Muslims. Jinnah forwarded it the next day, describing its authors as three members of his Working Committee.

== President of the Council of State ==
Sir Maneckji Dadabhoy retired as President of the Council of State at the end of the 1946 autumn session, and the office was vacant for about two months. On 26 January 1947 a correspondent reported from New Delhi that "it is understood that Hossein Imam, Muslim League Member, of the Council of State, will be nominated by the Viceroy as President of the Council in place of Dadhabhoy who retired at the end of the last session". (Note: The report is of an intention, in the future tense, and does not fix the date on which the appointment took effect.) Writing to Rajendra Prasad the same day, Wavell explained that a proposal for an informal election had been set aside on the advice of the Leader of the House, and that "on his recommendation I had in fact already decided to appoint Mr. Hossain Imam"; the appointment was to be notified in a Gazette Extraordinary. Wavell added that Imam "will resign from the Working Committee of the Muslim League as soon as his appointment as President is notified". On 27 January, when Liaquat Ali Khan asked whether Imam might attend the forthcoming meeting of the League's Working Committee at Karachi, Wavell noted that "as his appointment to be President of the Council of State had not yet been announced, this did not seem to be objectionable". He presided over the budget session that opened on 17 February 1947. The ceremonial accounts of Lord Mountbatten's arrival on 22 March 1947 and of his swearing-in two days later both name the President of the Council of State among those in attendance. Imam was still holding the office in June 1947, when a letter of his to Jinnah was typed on the letterhead of the President, Council of State.

On 15 March 1947, in Wavell's last week as Viceroy, Imam called on him as President of the Council of State. Wavell recorded that he "came ostensibly to say goodbye, but occupied 15 minutes by a hymn of hate against Congress, especially on the score of lack of generosity to Muslims", and added: "this is of course true, and is where Congress have shown such short-sightedness".

While President, Imam continued to be received as a League spokesman. Mountbatten recorded an interview with him on 12 April 1947 in which Imam pressed the case for Pakistan, agreed that the same logic would allow the partition of the Punjab and Bengal but asked the Viceroy to "temper logic with mercy", and was "horrified" at the suggestion of a Pakistan without the port of Calcutta. Mountbatten added that Imam "appears to me to be a much more moderate-minded Muslim than I have recently come across, and his arguments appear to be reasonably unprejudiced". A confidential government telegram of June 1947 describes him as "President Council of State and former member Muslim League Working Committee", and records that he had been nominated to India's delegation to the International Cereals Conference in Paris; whether he attended is not known. The Council of State was dissolved on 14 August 1947.

== Partition ==
=== Writings on partition ===
Imam contributed two signed forewords to A. B. Rajput's Muslim League: Yesterday and Today, published at Lahore in 1948. The first, signed "(Before Partition)", argues against the partition of Bengal and the Punjab on economic and historical grounds, observing that "in the present-day world a population cannot live without economic organization and natural resources" and recalling the agitation against Lord Curzon's partition of Bengal in 1905: "It was a successful agitation and resulted in the reunion of the two parts. Why do they now ask for partition?" He disputed the Indian National Congress's claim to speak for the whole non-Muslim population, citing the Akalis, the Scheduled Castes and the tribal peoples, and set out a statistical case on the proportions of Muslims in British India and in the subcontinent as a whole. He also argued that reopening provincial boundaries would be disastrous for Muslims, instancing Mymensingh and the Santhal Parganas.

The second foreword, signed "(After Partition)", was written after the announcement of the Radcliffe award. Imam wrote that "the British Chairman of the Boundary Commission has done what was never expected by any honest, conscientious and just man", the award not being based on contiguous majority areas, "which was the main principle on which the boundaries between Pakistan and Hindustan were to be decided according to the instructions issued by His Majesty's Government", and that "the partition of assets between Pakistan and the rest of India has also been most unfair". He concluded by addressing the Muslims who remained in India: "The Muslims of India outside Pakistan have an uphill task, with no help from outside. But trusting in God and relying on our own self help, let us proceed towards the making of a better, more prosperous India."

=== The Muslim League after partition ===
By December 1947 Imam was again a member of the League's Working Committee for Bihar. He travelled to Karachi in December 1947 for the meeting of the Council of the All-India Muslim League held at Khaliqdina Hall on 14 and 15 December, at which Jinnah presided and the League was divided into separate organisations for Pakistan and for the Indian Union. Imam proposed an amendment to the resolution on the division, which fell for want of a seconder; the resolution was carried with five members dissenting.

== Constituent Assembly of India ==
Imam was elected to the Constituent Assembly of India from Bihar in the Muslim seats in 1946. In the Assembly he spoke on its rules of procedure, argued that members should be systematically advised on comparative constitutional practice, opposed a proposed power for a provincial governor to assume the government of a province as "undemocratic", and set out the working of proportional representation by the single transferable vote. He served on the Assembly's Committee on Chief Commissioners' Provinces, and on its Committee on the Functions of the Constituent Assembly, whose report he defended in the house on 29 August 1947: "As a member of the Committee, I have come here to explain the position in which we worked." He objected to adaptations empowering the Governor-General to summon and prorogue the Assembly, saying that "we are members of the Constituent Assembly and the Constituent Assembly meets and adjourns at its pleasure".

=== Union Powers ===
Speaking on the report of the Union Powers Committee on 20 August 1947, six days after partition, Imam prefaced his remarks by saying that he spoke "not on behalf of the Muslim League Party but as a citizen of India". He argued that the Indian states should have no more power than the provinces in taxation or legislation, and cautioned the Assembly against concentrating authority at the centre: "let us not give all the power to the Centre. Let the Units also have some work, some responsibilities and some resources. Unless we do this, our constitution will not be on sure foundations." On the same day he was appointed, with G. V. Mavalankar, Purushottamdas Tandon, B. R. Ambedkar, Alladi Krishnaswami Ayyar, N. Gopalaswami Ayyangar and B. L. Mitter, to a committee to consider the Indian Independence Act 1947 and the adaptation of the Government of India Act 1935; the committee's membership is recorded in that order over Mavalankar's signature as chairman.

=== The Draft Constitution and the uniform civil code ===
In the general debate on the Draft Constitution on 8 November 1948 Imam said that he found "the position of the President of the Drafting Committee unenviable. He has been attacked from the left for not having copied the Soviet Constitution, and from the right for not having gone back to the village."

In the debate on the draft article providing for a uniform civil code, on 23 November 1948, he questioned whether uniformity was practicable in a country of such diversity, noted that the draft constitution gave provinces concurrent jurisdiction over marriage, divorce and succession, and said that "the apprehension felt by the members of the minority community is very real", adding that a "Secular State does not mean that it is anti-religious State"; he asked the Drafting Committee to bring forward safeguards to meet those apprehensions.

=== Signing of the Constitution ===
Imam was among the members who signed the Constitution of India at the Assembly's final sitting on 24 January 1950. At the same sitting, on the election of Rajendra Prasad as the first President of India, he said: "it is a day of happiness for all especially for us Biharis, as it is after centuries that a Bihari has been able to give its services to India in the manner and in the personality of your goodself."

== Indian parliamentary career after partition ==
Imam continued to sit for Bihar in the Constituent Assembly (Legislative) and then in the Provisional Parliament, taking a regular part in debate and question hour on the financial settlement between India and Pakistan, taxation, currency, industrial research, insurance and the supply of yarn to handloom weavers. He was elected to standing committees of the departments of Defence and of States in 1947, of Commerce in 1949 and 1950, and to the Indian Council of Agricultural Research in December 1950; and he sat on the select committees on the Industrial Finance Corporation Bill in January 1948, with Ambedkar, R. K. Shanmukham Chetty and others, and on the Banking Companies Bill in August 1948. In December 1948 a notification of the Ministry of Agriculture appointed Rajendra Prasad to the Board of Management of the Indian People's Famine Trust "vice Mr. Abu Abdulla Syed Husain Imam".

=== Panel of Chairmen ===
Imam was one of the Panel of Chairmen, and presided over sittings of the house on fourteen occasions between November 1947 and March 1950, the debates recording that "Mr. Speaker vacated the Chair, which was then occupied by Mr. Hussain Imam (one of the Panel of Chairmen)".

=== India and Pakistan ===
In a speech of 18 March 1948 on the defence estimates he addressed "the feeling of insecurity felt both by India and Pakistan", saying that "war-mongering by either side would be ruinous to both. It is not so much by expending more and more on defence that you safeguard the interests of the country as by cultivating better relationships and removing points of friction", and asking the governments of both countries "to try and meet each other half-way". In the same speech he criticised the reduction of detail in the defence estimates—"I think this is a strange fruit of freedom that we are getting"—and called for "sixteen annas value for every rupee that we expend". On 1 April 1948 he gave notice of an adjournment motion on "the disrespect shown to this House by the Government in increasing the postal rates between India and Pakistan without informing the House or consulting the Standing Committee of the Department".

=== Evacuee property ===
Imam spoke repeatedly on the administration of evacuee property. In April 1950 he told the house that "we have made persons evacuees, the vast majority of whom have ceased to be Indian citizens", and questioned whether the category of "intending evacuee" could be reconciled with fundamental rights; in April 1951 he said that "nearly 80 per cent. of the Muslims of India are under the Evacuee Act", and that "if you leave India you become an evacuee, if you come back outside the time permitted you become an evacuee. It is a manufactured evacuee." He was himself declared an evacuee after his migration the following year.

=== Zamindari abolition and the Hindu Code Bill ===
On the abolition of the zamindari system he said in May 1951 that "there was no one in Bihar who denied the necessity of abolishing zamindaris", the quarrel being "only about fair and adequate compensation", and that property "must not be held sacrosanct when it is held by black-marketeers and industrialists". Speaking on the Hindu Code Bill on 7 February 1951—in Urdu, saying "today I also want to speak in my own language"—he said that he would ordinarily not have taken part in a debate on "a measure applicable to my sister community", and that "there would have been no objection on our part to come under a common code had it been in advance of our own system. But my complaint is that it is very much backward … I therefore wish to be excused from coming down to your level."

=== First Amendment ===
Imam moved three amendments to the Constitution (First Amendment) Bill on 1 June 1951, including one to insert the words "grave danger to" in the clause qualifying the right to freedom of speech, and he voted against the bill in each of the three divisions in which he is named: on the motion for consideration on 31 May 1951, on a clause concerning the appointment of judges on 2 June, and on the third reading the same day.

=== University autonomy ===
In September 1951 he opposed the bills amending the constitutions of Banaras Hindu University and Aligarh Muslim University as an encroachment on the independence of universities. Replying to the debate, the education minister Maulana Azad said that Imam had "delivered the most forceful speech", and reported that he had said "the flickering lamp of freedom of educational institutions was being put out".

== Migration to Pakistan ==
Imam migrated to Pakistan in the autumn of 1951. The migration was reported from New Delhi on 9 October 1951 in a Press Trust of India dispatch, which stated that his wife and children had been living in Pakistan since 1947, that he had started a business in Lahore in 1947, that a permanent return permit granted for his wife in 1950 had not been used, and that the Custodian of Evacuee Property at Patna had declared him an evacuee under an ordinance of June 1950, an order subsequently revoked. The same dispatch quoted a Hindustan Times editorial describing him as "one of those individuals who believe in having their feet on two boats". On 12 October 1951 the Working Committee of the Indian Union Muslim League, meeting at Madras under the presidency of M. M. Ismail, took exception to charges made against the Indian government on his departure.

Asked about him in the Indian parliament on 4 March 1952, the Minister of State for Rehabilitation confirmed that he had migrated "since September or October, 1951", that he had been declared an evacuee, and that his property in India had been notified as evacuee property; the property was said to comprise urban houses together with rural and agricultural land.

== Later life in Pakistan ==
=== East African Muslim Conference, 1953 ===
On 26 and 27 December 1953 Imam presided over the East African Muslim Conference at the Aga Khan Diamond Jubilee Hall in Nairobi, a meeting of more than 1,500 delegates convened to draw up a plan for a central Muslim association for the whole of East Africa, and to press for the recognition of Kenya's Muslims as a separate entity from other Asians and for separate seats on the Nairobi City Council and other bodies. He had been specially invited to preside. Wire reports of his presidential address stated that he told the delegates that Africans "had been neglected too long" and that "the Moslem responsibility to the African was very great", and that if the British wished to continue relations of cordiality with other races in the Commonwealth they could do so "only with the willing consent of the people living within the various British territories". A contemporary press photograph of the presidential table, credited to the Associated Press, names him third from the left as "President of the Conference", between Nawab Sadik Ali Khan, Commissioner for Pakistan in Nairobi, and Dr Yusuf, the conference secretary; also at the table were Maulana Hifzur Rehman, an Indian member of parliament, an Arab delegate, and Sir Eboo Pirbhai, chairman of the reception committee. (Note: The four contemporary reports spell his name variously as "Syed Hussein Imam", "Sayed Hussein Imam" and "Sayed Hussain Iman"; Karim independently records that he presided at a conference of the Muslims of East Africa in 1953.)

=== Fact Finding Committee on Handlooms, 1956 ===
Imam was chairman of the Government of Pakistan's Fact Finding Committee on Handlooms, whose 246-page Report was published at Karachi by the Manager of Publications in 1956.

=== Other activity ===
According to Karim, Imam settled in Karachi, was the founding chairman of the House Building Finance Corporation until 1958 and of the Saudabad Trust until 1957, visited China in 1955 as deputy leader of a Pakistani delegation, and travelled through Egypt, Turkey, Tunisia, Algeria, Saudi Arabia, Kuwait and Iraq early in 1965. Karim also states that he publicly opposed the death sentence passed on Abul A'la Maududi in 1953 and argued for freedom of the press during Zulfikar Ali Bhutto's government. (Note: The House Building Finance Corporation's own published history does not name a first chairman.) Karim further records that in 1966 Imam and other former Muslim Leaguers asked President Ayub Khan to release the records of the All-India Muslim League, which had been seized in Karachi in 1958, and that his later letters on the subject went unanswered.

=== Advocacy for the Biharis ===
In 1983 Imam published a pamphlet, The Sad Plight of the Biharies from 1971 to 1983: An Appeal to the President of Pakistan and all the Heads of the Muslim States, appealing on behalf of the Biharis stranded in Bangladesh after 1971.

=== Ansari Commission, 1983 ===
In 1983 Imam was named one of three honorary advisers to the Ansari Commission on the Form of Government, appointed by President Zia-ul-Haq in July of that year, the other two being the scholars Muhammad Hamidullah and Muhammad Asad. The commission's report records that Hamidullah and Imam were unable to come to Islamabad on account of illness, and that the commission was therefore unable to benefit from their views. (Note: The report gives his name without any descriptor; the identification rests on the name and the company in which it appears.)

== Death ==
Imam died at Karachi on 16 January 1985. A biographical dictionary of deaths in Pakistan compiled by Muhammad Aslam and published in 1990 gives the date, citing the Lahore edition of the Urdu daily Jang of 17 January 1985. Karim, writing in 1992, gives the same date and records that his funeral prayers were attended by the Governor of Sindh, Lieutenant-General Jahan Dad Khan, representing President Zia-ul-Haq. (Note: The Library of Congress name authority record gives his dates as 1897–1985, but its own source note shows that they were taken from Karim, and it is therefore not an independent attestation.)

== Works ==
- Imam, Hussain (1931). "Statement of Objects and Reasons, Council of State Bill No. 2 of 1931 (Provident Funds (Amendment) Bill)". The Calcutta Gazette. Part VI, 22 October 1931.
- Imam, Hossain (1932). "Statement of Objects and Reasons, Council of State Bill No. 3 of 1932 (Indian Life Assurance Companies (Amendment) Bill)". The Calcutta Gazette. Part VI, 16 June 1932.
- Imam, H. (1940). "The Delhi Masajid Bill, 1940, with Statement of Objects and Reasons". The Calcutta Gazette. Part VI, 6 June 1940, pp. 101–106.
- Forewords ("Before Partition" and "After Partition") to Rajput, A. B. (1948). Muslim League: Yesterday and Today. Lahore: Muhammad Ashraf. pp. vii–xi.
- Pakistan. Fact Finding Committee on Handlooms (1956). Report of the Fact Finding Committee on Handlooms. Chairman: Husain Imam. Karachi: Manager of Publications.
- Imam, Syed Hussain (1983). The Sad Plight of the Biharies from 1971 to 1983: An Appeal to the President of Pakistan and all the Heads of the Muslim States. Karachi.

Karim states that Imam had earlier published memoirs in serial form in the Karachi Urdu daily Jang, and that his biography was built from a draft of several hundred pages that Imam left at his death.
