= Holberton =

Holberton is a surname. Notable people with the name include:

- Betty Holberton (1917–2001), American computer programmer
- Edgar Holberton (1874–1949), British businessman and politician
- Frederick Holberton (1821–1907), Australian politician
- Robert Holberton (1800–1884), Anglican priest, Archdeacon of Antigua 1843–1850

== See also ==
- Halberton, a village in Devon, England
- Holbeton, a village in Devon, England
