= Maneckji =

Maneckji is a given name. Notable people with the name include:

- Maneckji Byramji Dadabhoy, KCSI, KCIE (1865–1953), Indian lawyer, industrialist, and political figure
- Maneckji Nusserwanji Dhalla (1875–1956), Pakistani Zoroastrian priest and religious scholar
- Maneckji Limji Hataria (1813–1890), Indian scholar and civil rights activist of Parsi Zoroastrian descent
- Dinshaw Maneckji Petit (1823–1901), Indian industrialist and philanthropist
- Hormasji Maneckji Seervai (1906–1996), Indian jurist, lawyer and writer

== See also ==
- Maneckji Seth Agiary, a Zoroastrian fire temple in Mumbai, India, constructed in 1735
