= 1930 Indian general election =

- 1930

104 seats contested 53 seats needed for a majority
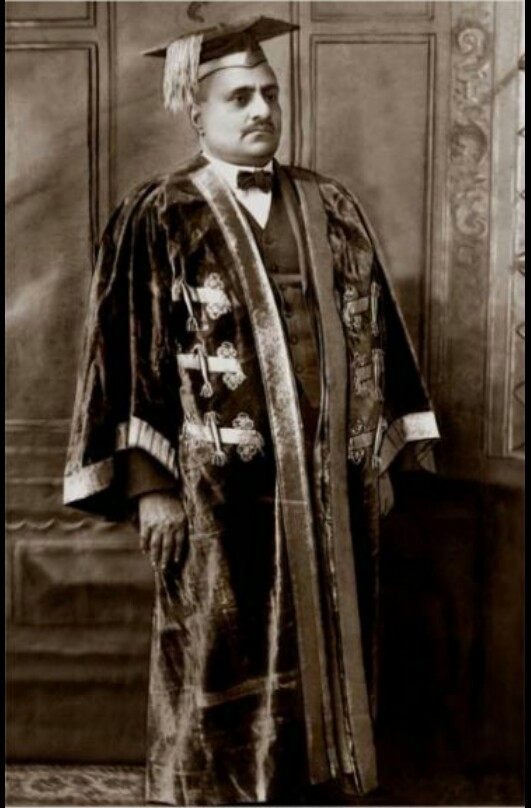

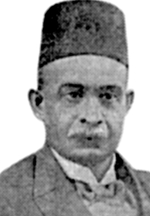
	First party	Second party
Leader	Hari Singh Gour	Abdur Rahim
Party	NP	Independent
Seats won	40	30

General elections were held in British India in September 1930. They were boycotted by the Indian National Congress and marked by public apathy. The newly elected Central Legislative Assembly met for the first time on 14 January 1931.

== Results ==
=== Central Legislative Assembly ===
Party	Seats
Nationalist Party	40
Independent groupings	30
Minor parties, unattached independents, unknown	25
Europeans	9
Total	104
Source: Schwartzberg Atlas

== Members of Central Legislative Assembly ==
=== Officials ===
- Government of India: P. J. Grigg, Sir Nripendra Nath Sircar, J. W. Bhore, Harry Graham Haig, Sir Frank Noyce, P Raghavendra Rau, Lancelot Graham, Girija Shankar Bajpai, G. R. F. Tottenham, H. A. F. Metcalfe, S. P. Varma, K. Sanjiva Row, T. Rayan, A. G. Clow, C. W. Gwynne, J. C. Nixon, Tin Tut, N. R. Pillai, J. W. L. Megaw, S. N. Roy, T. Sloan, A. F. R. Lumby, A. J. Raisman, E. W. Perry, W. L. Scott
- Berar: S. G. Jog
- Nominated from Provinces: S. G. Grantham (Bihar), Shams-ul-Ulama Kamaluddin Ahmad, Aboo Abdullah Md. Zakaullah Khan, Mian Abdul Aziz, P. P. Sinha, D. J. N. Lee

=== Nominated Non-Officials ===
- Special Interests: N. M. Joshi (Labour Interests), M. C. Rajah (Depressed Classes), Henry Gidney (Anglo-Indian), Dr. Francis Xavier DeSouza (Indian Christians), R. T. H. Mackenzie (Associated Chambers of Commerce)
- Provinces: Satya Charan Mukherjee (Bengal), R. D. Dalal (Bombay), R. Srinivasa Sarma (Bihar & Orissa), Sardar Sir Jawahar Singh (Punjab), Captain Rao Bahadur Lal Chand (Punjab), Captain Sher Mohammad Khan (Punjab), Malik Allah Baksh Khan Tiwana (Punjab), Major Nawab Ahmad Nawaz Khan (NWFP), Maulvi Rafiuddin Ahmed (United Provinces), L. C. Bass

=== Elected Non-Officials ===
- Ajmer-Merwara: Harbilas Sarda
- Assam: Abdul Matin Chaudhury (Muslim)
- Bengal: Charu Chandra Biswas (Calcutta Urban General), Naba Kumar Singh Dudhoria (Calcutta Suburbs Urban General), Amar Nath Dutt (Burdwan General), Satyendranath Sen (Presidency General), K. C. Neogy (Dacca General), S. C. Mitra (Chittagong & Rajshahi General), Sir Abdur Rahim (Calcutta & Suburbs Muslim), Abdullah Al-Mamun Suhrawardy (Burdwan & Presidency Muslim), A. H. Ghuznavi (Dacca cum Mymensingh Muslim), Haji Choudhury Mohamed Ismail Khan (Bakergunj cum Faridpur Muslim), Anwarul Azim (Chittagong Muslim), Kabiruddin Ahmed (Rajshahi Muslim), D. K. Lahiri Chaudhury (Landholders), Satish Chandra Sen (Bengal National Chamber of Commerce), Darcy Lindsay (European), E. Studd (European), G. Morgan (European)
- Bihar & Orissa: Babu Gaya Prasad Singh (Muzaffarpur cum Champaran General), Sitakanta Mahapatra (Orissa General), Bhabananda Das (Orissa General), Babu Badri Lal Rastogi (Patna cum Shahabad General), Gupteshwar Prasad Singh (Gaya cum Monghyr General), Pandit Ram Krishna Jha (Darbhanga cum Saran General), Sukhraj Roy (Bhagalpur, Purnea & Santhal Pargana General), Thakur Mohendra Nath Shah Deo (Chota Nagpur General), M. Maswood Ahmad (Patna & Chota Nagpur cum Orissa Muslim), Moulvi Badl-us-Zaman (Bhagalpur Muslim), Moulvi Muhammad Shafee Daoodi (Tirhut Muslim), Bhupat Singh (Landhol
- Bombay: Naoroji Dumasia (Bombay City General), Sir Cowasji Jehangir (Bombay City General), B. L. Patil (Bombay Southern General), Bhaskarrao Jadhav (Bombay General), Narayanrao Gunjal (Bombay Central General), N. N. Anklesaria (Bombay Northern General), Lalchand Navalrai (Sind General), Rahimtoola Chinoy (Bombay City General), Fazal I Rahimtoola (Bombay Central Muslim), Abdullah Haroon (Sind Muslim), Nawab Naharsing Iswar Singh (Sind Landholders), Purshotamdas Thakurdas (Indian Merchants' Chamber of Bombay), Sardar G. N. Majumdar (Gujarat & Deccan Sardars & Inamdars Landholders), Homi Mody (Bombay Millowners' Association), D. N. O'Sullivan (European), Sir Leslie Sewell Hudson (European)
- Burma: U Kyaw Myint, U Ba Maung, E. S. Millar (European), W. J. C. Richards (European)
- Central Provinces: S. R. Pandit (Nagpur General), Hari Singh Gour (Hindi Divisions General), Seth Liladhar Choudhury (Hindi Divisions General), H. M. Wilayatullah, Goswami M. R. Puri
- Delhi: Bhagat Chandi Mal Gola
- Madras: Arcot Ramasamy Mudaliar (Madras City General), B. Sitarama Raju (Ganjam cum Vizagapatam General), T. N. Ramakrishna Reddi (Madras ceded districts & Chittoor General), R. K. Shanmukham Chetty (Salem & Coimbatore cum North Arcot General), Mothay Narasimha Rao (Godavari cum Kistna General), Ponaka Govindu Reddy Garu (Guntur cum Nellore General), T. Rangachari (South Arcot cum Chingleput General), G. Krishnamachariar (Tanjore cum Trichinopoly General), B. Rajaram Pandian (Madura and Ramnad cum Tinnevelly General), Mahomed Muazzam Sahib Bahadur (North Madras Muslim), Moulvi Sayyid Murtuza Saheb Bahadur (South Madras Muslim), Kottal Uppi Saheb Bahadur (Nilgiris & West Coast Muslim), F. E. James (European), Raja Sir Vasudeva Rajah of Kollengode (Landholders), Vidya Sagar Pandya (Madras Indian Commerce), K. P. Thamban (Landholders)
- Punjab: Bhai Parmanand (Ambala General), Jagannath Agarwal (Jullundur General), B. R. Puri (West Punjab General), Nawab Muhammad Ibrahim Ali Khan (East Punjab Muslim), Shaikh Sadiq Khan (East Central Punjab), Mian Mohammad Shah Nawaz (West Central Punjab), Major Nawab Malik Talib Mehdi Khan (North Punjab Muslim), Makhdum Sayad Rajan Baksh Shah (South West Punjab Muslim), Shaikh Fazal-i-Haq Piracha (North West Punjab Muslim), Sardar Harbans Singh Brar (East Punjab Sikh), Sardar Sant Singh (West Punjab Sikh), Sardar Sohan Singh (Landholders)
- United Provinces: Lala Rameshwar Prasad Bagla (UP Cities General), A. Das (Benares and Gorakpur General), L. Brij Kishore (Lucknow General), Sardar Nihal Singh (Fyzabad General), Haji Wajihuddin (UP Cities Muslim), Kunwar Hajee Ismail Alikhan (Meerut Muslim), J. R. Scott (European), Lala Hari Raj Swarup (Landholders), C. S. Ranga Iyer, Chaudhri Isra, Madan Mohan Malaviya, Sir Mohammad Yakub, Ziauddin Ahmad, Mohamed Azhar Ali, Kunwar Raghubir Singh (Landholders)
