= B. N. Sarma =

Rao Bahadur Sir Bayya Narasimheswara Sarma, KCSI) (1867–1932) was an Indian lawyer, zamindar and estate landholder, politician and member of the Viceroy's Executive Council.

== Biography ==
Sarma was born in 1867 to Bayya Mahadeva Sastry, a Vaidik Brahmin inamdar in Visakhapatnam, Madras Presidency, now in Andhra Pradesh and had his early education in the Hindu High School, Visakhapatnam. He graduated with first class in his B.A from the Rajahmundry Government College, then under Madras University. He won the Metcalfe scholarship for his academic ability.

Narasimheswara Sarma studied law at Madras University and joined the Congress during its Madras session in 1887. He began his career as a lawyer as a member of the Visakhapatnam bar in 1891. He was municipal chairman of Visakhapatnam twice and he did good work to improve the town. As a result of his success in public life, he was nominated to the council of the presidency of Madras in 1906 and developed a keen interest in politics. He was responsible for The Madras Estates Land Act (1908), which gave rights to tenant farmers in estates and streamlined estate and inam revenue administration, though he himself was a holder of zamindari and inam lands. He was the first president of the Andhra Mahasabha held at Bapatla in 1913. In 1914 he went to London as a member of a Congress delegation along with Jinnah, S.Sinha, Lajpat Rai, Mazhar- ul- Haque and Samarth, where he delivered speeches in Kensington hall and also spoke before groups of British parliamentarians appraising them of Indian problems and the need for political reform. He quit active legal practice at a very young age as he felt it would be contradictory to his position in public life. He became a member of the imperial council in 1916. In 1918 he put forth a resolution in the imperial council recommending linguistic provinces. This was opposed vehemently, ironically by Jinnah. He was a champion of indianization of services and strove hard for the development of industry, agriculture and education and took great pains to develop a well regulated banking system in the country. He strove hard for the amelioration of indentured labor in Africa, Fiji, etc. He was considered one of the foremost authorities in land tenures, revenue and estate matters in the country. He stressed the need for the development of a national capital city and took great interest in the development of New Delhi. He fought with the British establishment for release of adequate funding for the development of Delhi, a fact acknowledged by Lutyens and Baker in their book Indian Summer.

Narasimhesvara Sarma was a theosophist from his early days. However, in the beginning, he was opposed to Annie Besant. But when Besant launched the Home Rule Movement, he supported her. Sarma also joined the national education board set up by her. He co-authored with B.N. Basu the Memorandum of nineteen which put the Indian perspective of reforms to the government. He was a committed moderate in his political views and was conservative in his personal life to which many took affront. He was highly respected for his personal philanthropy and many institutions received benefactions from him.

When the Montagu–Chelmsford Reforms were passed in 1919, Sarma differed from the Tilak group of Congressmen and Besant and supported the moderate view that the reforms were a step in the right direction and should be given a chance. He was one of the few members of the Indian Congress to give a speech in the Imperial Legislative Council supporting the reforms while still in the Congress, the other moderates already having left and formed the liberal party. He opposed the recall of Viceroy Lord Chelmsford, on behalf of the moderates for which he was criticized. He was made a member of the viceroy's executive council in 1920 from which he retired in 1925. He held the portfolios of revenue, agriculture, public works, finance and education during his tenure. His Indian colleagues in the council were sir T.B.Sapru and Sir Mohd. Shafi. He was knighted in the 1923 Birthday Honours List as a Knight Commander of the Order of the Star of India (KCSI). In 1924 he was made president of the council of state. when the Andhra University was formed, he presided over its first general body meeting. He was also president of the railway rates commission, a post which he held till his death in 1932.
