= Henry Moncrieff Smith =

British administrator in India (1873–1951)

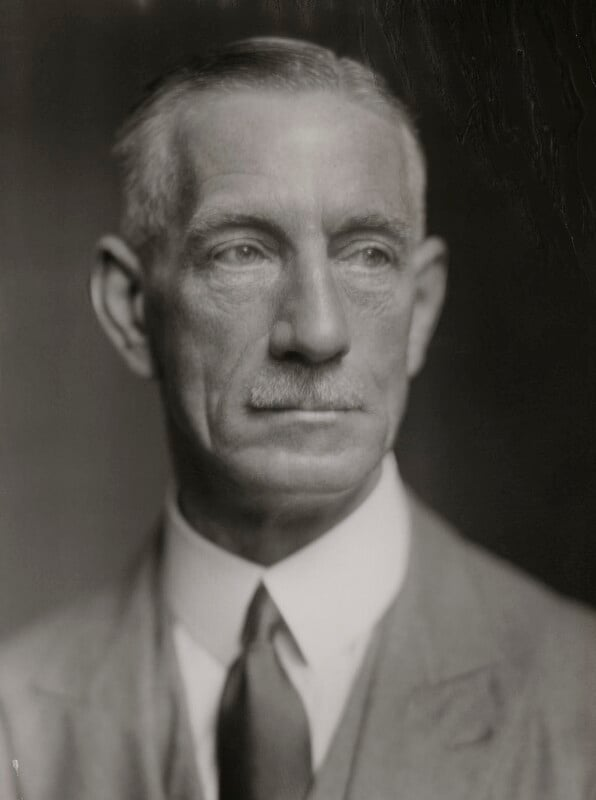
Smith in 1931

Sir Henry Moncrieff Smith CIE (23 December 1873 – 21 November 1951) was a British administrator in India.

Smith was educated at Blundell's School and Sidney Sussex College, Cambridge. He joined the Indian Civil Service in 1897 and was posted to the United Provinces, where he served as a judge from 1908 to 1914. In 1915 he was appointed Deputy Secretary of the Legislative Department of the Government of India, and became Joint Secretary in 1919 and Secretary in 1921. He was the first Secretary of the Council of State, from 1921 to 1923. He then served as Secretary of the Central Legislative Assembly from 1921 to 1924, and in 1924 became the second President of the Council of State. He retired in 1932.

He was appointed Companion of the Order of the Indian Empire (CIE) in the 1920 New Year Honours and was knighted in 1923.
