= G. N. Chetty =

Diwan Bahadur Sir Gopathi Narayanaswami Chettiar

Member of the Council of State (Imperial Legislative Council of India)
- In office 1930–1936
- Governors-General: E. F. L. Wood, 1st Earl of Halifax, Freeman Freeman-Thomas, 1st Marquess of Willingdon

Personal details
- Born: 28 September 1881 Madras, India
- Died: 13 June 1950 (aged 68) Madras, India
- Profession: merchant, businessman

Diwan Bahadur Sir Gopathi Narayanaswami Chettiar CIE (Tamil: கோபதி நாராயணசுவாமி செட்டியார்; 28 September 1881 – 13 June 1950) was an Indian merchant, landlord, politician, legislator and economist.

== Early life ==
Narayanaswami Chettiar was born into the Gopathi balija family. He was the son of Gopathy Mahadeva Chettiar. He was educated in Madras. He was an elected President of Madras Corporation.

== Public life ==
Narayanaswamy Chetty served as the member of the Council of State, Imperial Legislative Council of India, from 1930 to 1936. He also served as a President of the Madras Corporation. He was a member of the Joint Select Committee of the Reserve Bank of India Bill and played a pivotal role in the formation of the Reserve Bank of India.

== Honours ==
Narayanaswamy Chetty was made a Companion of the Order of the Indian Empire in 1929 and a Knights Bachelor in 1945.

G. N. Chetty Road in T. Nagar, Chennai is named after Gopathi Narayanaswami Chetty.
