= Ataullah Khan Tarar =

First Muslim member of the Indian Council of State representing undivided Punjab

Khan Bahadur Ataullah Khan Tarar (Urdu: خان بہادر عطا اللہ خان تارڑ) was the elected Muslim member of the Council of State from the undivided Punjab in fourth council of state.
