= Sukhbir Sinha =

Lala Sukhbir Sinha
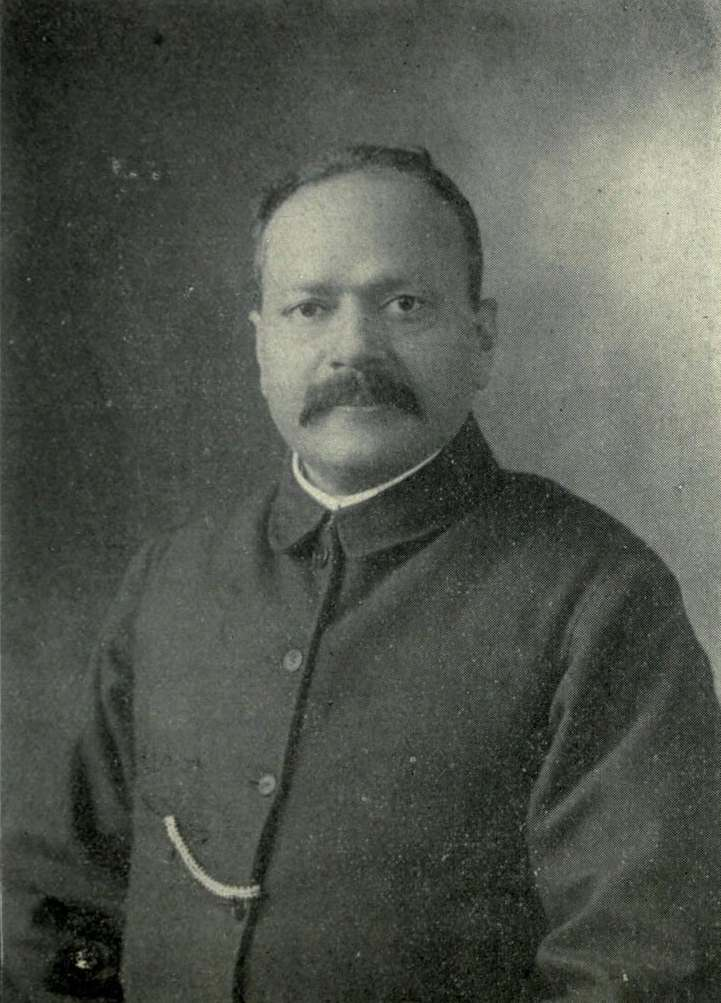
- Born: 1868; Muzaffarnagar, United Provinces, British India
- Died: 2 November 1928 (aged 59–60)
- Education: Agra College
- Occupations: Politician, Zamindar
- Organization: Hindu Mahasabha
- Known for: Hindu Mahasabha leadership, anti-cow slaughter movement, educational and political contributions
- Parent: Rai Nihalchand Bahadur (father)
- Relatives: Lala Odey Ram (grandfather), Lala Shib Narain (grandfather)

Lala Sukhbir Sinha (1868 – 2 November 1928) was a noted politician, zamindar and Hindu Mahasabha leader from the United Provinces of British India.

Sinha was born at Muzaffarnagar, son of Rai Nihalchand Bahadur. His grandparents Lala Odey Ram and Lala Shib Narain had been rewarded for their loyalty to the British during the 1857 mutiny. He was educated at Agra College. He was elected member to the United Provinces Legislative Council in 1909. He was elected to the first Council of State in 1921 and also the Second Council of State in 1926. He served as president of Anglo-Sanskrit School, Muzafarnagar; Honorary Magistrate, Muzafarnagar and as trustee of Meerut College, Meerut and the Central Hindu College of Benares. He was closely associated with Hindu Mahasabha and a noted leader who led an Anti Cow-killing Movement in the United Provinces. He was Honorary Secretary of the Zamindar's Association, Muzafarnagar. He presided over the Vaishya Conference held at Allahabad, 1910. He owned lands in Muzafarnagar and Saharanpur and much of it given a tax rebate by the British Indian government.
