= Arthur Froom =

Sir Arthur Henry Froom (15 January 1873 – 29 October 1964) was a British businessman and political figure in British India.

Educated at St Paul's School, he entered the service of P&O in 1890; from 1912 to 1916, he was the company's Bombay superintendent. From 1916 to 1930, he was a partner in Mackinnon, Mackenzie & Co. He was Chairman of the Bombay Chamber of Commerce in 1920; the same year, he became a member of the Imperial Legislative Council. From 1921 to 1930, he was a member of the Council of State. He was knighted in 1922. Froom married twice, first in 1905 he married Effie Spry Bryant (1874-1924) in London. Second he married Isabel Patricia Manners Downup (1895-1978) in India in 1925.
