= Dinshaw Edulji Wacha =

Indian politician (1844–1936)

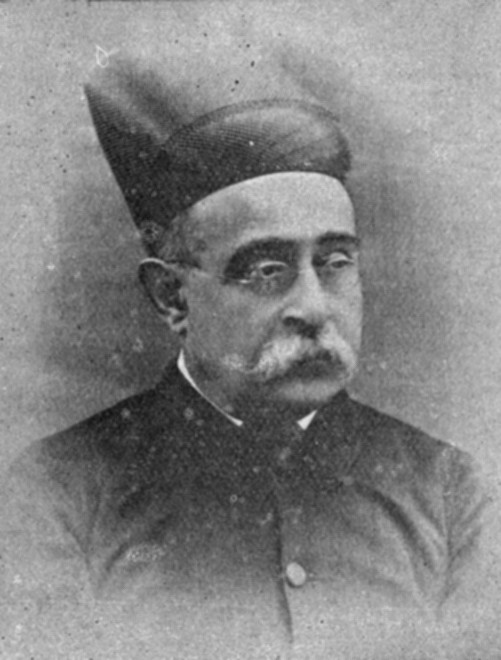

Sir Dinshaw Edulji Wacha (2 August 1844 – 18 February 1936) was a Parsi politician from Bombay (Mumbai). He was one of the founding members of the Indian National Congress. Wacha was also the president of the Congress in 1901.

== Biography ==
Wacha was associated with the cotton industry and was the President of the Indian Merchants' Chamber in 1915. He was knighted in 1917. Sir Dinshaw was a member of the Bombay Legislative Council, the Imperial Legislative Council and the Council of State. He headed the Western India Liberal Association from 1919 to 1927.

Wacha lamented the lack of dedicated leaders willing to devote themselves to Congress's political goals. He observed how many figures, among them Pherozeshah Mehta, who would have made capable leaders, eschewed total alliance with the Congress for fear of damage to their private careers. Despite this lack of support from Indian leaders, Wacha did acknowledge the vital role that the Scotsman, Allan Hume, played in maintaining Congress in between sessions, stating, "He is the man to give us steam." Still, Wacha expressed concern over Hume's growing influence over Congress and micromanagement of its affairs. "Because he is indispensable... [Hume] ought not to behave as a tyrant...He thinks in all matters he must have the upper hand." Wacha encouraged fellow Indians to take a more active and vocal role in Congress affairs, expressing, "We [Indians] ought to be energetic and patriotic enough to make an advance in our political progress without such aid. We cannot expect a perennial crop of Allan Humes to assist us."

Wacha was one of the governors of the Imperial Bank of India.

In South Mumbai, a road has been named after him, called Dinshaw Wachha Road.

== Published works ==
- Recent Indian finance (1910)
- Premchand Roychand: His early life and career (Bombay, 1913)
- Dinshaw Edulji Wacha (1915). The Life and Life Work of J. N. Tata: With a Portrait. Madras.
- Sir Dinsha Edulji Wacha (1920). Speeches and Writings of Sir Dinshaw Edulji Wacha. G.A. Natesan & Co.
- Shells from the Sands of Bombay. Being My Recollections and Reminiscences-1860-1875. Bombay. 1920.
- Rise and Growth of Bombay Municipal Government. Madras. 1913.
- G. A. Natesan, Dinshaw Edulji Wacha (Madras, 1909)
