= M. Abdul Karim =

Bengali lawyer and politician

Khan Bahadur Maulvi Abdul Karim

Education Minister of Bengal
- In office 1941–1945
- Prime Minister: A. K. Fazlul Huq

Member of the Bengal Legislative Assembly
- In office 1937–1945

Member of the Council of State
- In office 1921–1930
- Preceded by: Council established
- Succeeded by: Syed Abdul Hafeez
- Constituency: East Bengal Muhammadan

Personal details
- Born: 12 September 1873 Bahernagar, Mymensingh district, Bengal Presidency
- Died: 3 March 1945 (aged 71) Bahernagar
- Relatives: Fazle Hasan Abed (great grandnephew); Tamara Hasan Abed (great great grandniece)
- Education: Dacca College
- Alma mater: St. Xavier's College; University of Calcutta
- Occupation: Politician, lawyer
- Awards: Khan Bahadur, CIE

Khan Bahadur Maulvi Abdul Karim CIE (12 September 1873 – 3 March 1945) was a Bengali lawyer and politician.

== Early life and family ==
Abdul Karim was born on 12 September 1873 to a Bengali Muslim family in the village of Bahernagar in Bajitpur, Kishoreganj, then part of the Mymensingh district of the Bengal Presidency. His father, Maulvi Ali Ahmad, was a deputy magistrate whilst his grandfather, Maulvi Muhammad Sadi, was a judge at the Sherpur Civil Court. They were descendants of the 13th-century Islamic preacher Shah Taj Muhammad of Iraq. Sadi had migrated from Kaliachapra in Pakundia to Bahernagar after his mearriage to Abdul Karim's paternal grandmother Hajera Banu Bibi, who belonged to the Hasan family of Bahernagar.

Due to his father's work moving around, Abdul Karim studied in places like Backergunge, Sudharam and Faridpur. He passed his Entrance examination from Dacca Mohsinia Madrasa. He completed his FA from Dacca College in 1892. In 1895, he graduated with a First Position First Class Bachelor of Arts in English literature from St. Xavier's College in Calcutta. He was awarded his Bachelor of Laws degree in 1898 from the University of Calcutta.

== Career ==
He was a member of the Council of State, representing the Muslims of East Bengal, from 1926 to 1930. During his membership, he was included in the Chairman's Panel in the absence of the chairman twice in the Delhi and Simla sessions of 1927 and twice in the Delhi and Simla sessions of 1928.

While a member of the Legislative Council, he presided over the Faridpur Bengal Provincial Muslim Conference in 1930. He was elected a member of the Bengal Legislative Assembly in 1937. In 1941, he served as the Education Minister in the cabinet of Sher-e-Bangla Abul Kasem Fazlul Huq.

== Death ==
He died on 3 March 1945, in Bahernagar. His son Muhammad Enayet Karim co-founded the Dilalpur Abdul Karim High School.
