= C. S. Ranga Iyer =

Indian journalist, politician and independence activist

C. S. Ranga Iyer (1895–1963) was an Indian journalist, politician, Indian independence activist and social reformer.

== Personal life ==
C. S. Ranga Iyer was born in the Madras Presidency in 1895. He had his education in Madras Presidency and on completion of his education, started a career as a journalist. He served as the editor of the English-language newspaper The Independent. During this period, he wrote Father India, a parody of Katherine Mayo's Mother India.

Ranga Iyer was also active in politics and served as a member of the Indian National Congress until his expulsion in 1929.

== In the Imperial Legislative Council ==
Ranga Iyer was elected to the Imperial Legislative Council in 1923. In 1929, he proposed the Untouchability Abolition Bill in the Imperial Legislative Council but later withdrew his proposal reasoning that prominent members of the Congress as Mahatma Gandhi and Jawaharlal Nehru were opposed to the bill.

== Works ==
- C. S. Ranga Iyer (1922). A voice from prison. Ganesh.
- C. S. Ranga Iyer (1927). Father India: a reply to Mother India. Selwyn & Blount ltd.
- C. S. Ranga Iyer (1928). India in the crucible.
- C. S. Ranga Iyer (1930). India.
- C. S. Ranga Iyer (1930). India, peace or war. G.G. Harrap & co. ltd.
- C. S. Ranga Iyer (1935). How to lose India. Associated Business Corp., Ltd.
