= Veerabhadra Raju Bahadur =

Indian aristocrat and politician

Sri Raja Vairicherla Veerabhadra Raju Bahadur Garu
- A portrait of Veerabhadra Raju Bahadur
- Born: 6 September 1877; Kurupam, Vizianagaram District
- Occupation(s): politician, zamindar

Sri Raja Vairicherla Veerabhadra Raju Bahadur Garu (born 6 September 1877) was an Indian aristocrat and politician who served as the hereditary zamindar of Kurupam from September 1891 and as a member of the Madras Legislative Council

== Early life and education ==
Veerabhadra Raja Bahadur was born to Suryanarayana Raja, the then zamindar of Kurupam in Vizianagaram district on 6 September 1877. He was privately educated by Mr. F. A. Moss

== Political career ==
Veerabhadra became the zamindar of Kurupam with the title of Raja on the death of his father in September 1891. He, subsequently, entered politics in the early 1900s and was appointed member of the Newington Advisory Board of Madras in 1905. In 1906, he was nominated as an additional member to the Madras Legislative Council.

== Family ==
On 19 May 1897, Veerabhadra married Sri Rani Sahiba Lakshmi Narasayamma Patta Mahadevi Garu, the second daughter of G. N. Gajapathi Rao. The couple had two sons and a daughter.

- Raja Vyricherla Narasimha Suryanarayana Raju Bahadur Garu (1898-1926)
- Sri Sri Sri Vyricherla Narayana Gajapathi Raju Bahadur Garu (b. 1900)
- Rani Sri Janaki Ratnayamma Garu (1899-1944)
