= Robert Holberton =

English cleric in Antigua

(Fraddon) Robert Holberton (1800–1884) was an Anglican priest: most notably Archdeacon of Antigua from 1843 to 1850.

Holberton was born at Yealmpton and educated at Exeter College, Oxford, where he matriculated in 1817, graduating B.A. in 1821, and M.A. 1825. He was Rector of Antigua from 1827 to 1850. He was then the incumbent at Norbiton from 1850 to 1875. He died on 14 June 1884.
