= U. Rama Rao =

Indian politician

Udipi Rama Rau or U. Rama Rau (17 September 1874 - 12 May 1952) was an Indian politician from the Madras Presidency. He belonged to the Indian National Congress.

He was a medical doctor by profession and was the founder of a medical journal called Antiseptic along with T. M. Nair. He was one of the co-founders and later president of the Indian Medical Association. He served as a councilor in the Madras Corporation and in 1927 became a member of the Madras Legislative Council. He played a significant role in setting up the Madras Music Academy and served as its president in 1935. He was also nominated to the upper house of the Central Legislature of British India - the Council of State. During 1937–45, he served as the chairman of the upper house of the Madras legislature. His son U. Krishna Rau was also a doctor and politician. Rama Rau is also the great grandfather of Arvind Adiga.
