= R. Srinivasa Sarma =

Indian journalist and politician (1890-1957)

Sir Ramaswami Srinivasa Sarma CIE (1890 – 27 September 1957) was an Indian journalist and politician. He was the first Indian journalist to be knighted.

== Early life and education ==
Srinivasa Sarma was born in 1890 to Ramaswami Iyer and Lakshmi in the village of Pudu Agraharam near Thiruvaiyaru. Ramaswami Iyer was the district registrar of Tanjore district. Sarma studied at the Kalyanasundaram High School, Tanjore, Thiruvarur High School in Tiruvarur and the Mission High School in Royapettah. In 1908, he joined the Mission High School in Thiruvallur where his sister Kanamma lived. But Sarma never passed his matriculation examinations.

== Indian independence movement ==
Sarma was involved in the Indian independence movement from his early days. While a student, Sarma organised a procession in Tiruvarur. In 1911, Sarma sold his properties in Tiruvarur and Madras and moved to Calcutta where he joined Surendranath Banerjee and worked for the New India newspaper.

In 1929, Sarma was nominated to the Imperial Legislative Council of India by Lord Irwin, the then Viceroy of India. In the assembly, Sarma was the leader of a faction known as the "Central Party".

== Journalism ==
In 1911, Sarma joined the Bengalee newspaper of Calcutta as a proofreader at a pay of Rs. 15 a month. Two or three months later, he was promoted to sub-editor. He left the Bengalee in 1914 to join New India in Madras. But owing to differences with its editor, B. P. Wadia, Sarma quit the Bengalee and returned to New India. In 1916, Sarma joined the Associated Press and visited the United Kingdom in 1919, where he campaigned in favour of the Montagu–Chelmsford Reforms.

On his return to Calcutta, Sarma worked as editor of the New Empire newspaper and helped increase its popularity. Sarma was made a Companion of the Order of the Indian Empire in 1920 New Year Honours' List. In 1922, he was offered the post of General Manager of the Garden Reach Jute Mills of G. D. Birla with a princely salary of Rs. 5,000 a month. Seven years later, he became the first Indian to fly to the United Kingdom when Imperial Airways introduced its England-India service. In 1934, with the possibility of rapprochement between the Government of British India and Indian nationalists, Sarma started a weekly newspaper The Whip and toured the United Kingdom to popularize it. At the recommendation of Sir John Anderson, Sarma was knighted by Edward VIII. Sarma holds the unique record of being the only person to have been knighted by Edward VIII as the king abdicated shortly afterwards.

== Later politics ==
On returning to India, Sarma continued to be active in politics. In 1943, as a part of the government's war effort, Sarma was sent to the United States of America representing the government of British India. In the United States, Sarma had a meeting with the President, Franklin Delano Roosevelt. Sarma returned to India in 1944 and started a magazine for the East India Railway.

In 1952, Sarma contested in the Lok Sabha elections for the Thanjavur seat as an independent against the Indian National Congress's R. Venkataraman but lost by a margin of 4,000 votes. Disenchanted, Sarma quit politics with this defeat.

== Personal life ==
Sarma was a lifelong bachelor. In the 1930s, he bought land in the Cauvery Delta and constructed a manor in the English fashion naming it Durgalaya. He also built a temple nearby.

He had a brother and a sister. Sarma took care of his brother's living and wrote over to him 100 Veli's of land. Sarma died on 27 September 1957 at the age of 66 or 67.
