= Phiroze Sethna =

Indian politician (1866–1938)

Sir Phiroze Cursetjee Sethna
- Born: 8 October 1866
- Died: 16 September 1938 (aged 71)
- Occupation: Businessman

Sir Phiroze Cursetjee Sethna, OBE, JP (8 October 1866 – 16 September 1938), also spelled Pheroze, was an Indian businessman and political figure. He was a member of the Imperial Legislative Council and later a member of the Central Legislative Assembly and Council of State.

He was knighted in the 1926 Birthday Honours.
