= Edgar Holberton =

British Businessman & Political Figure

Sir Edgar Joseph Holberton, CBE (10 May 1874 – 22 May 1949) was a British businessman and political figure in British Burma.

The son of John Lidstone Holberton of Greenbank, Wordesley, Staffordshire, Holberton attended Sherborne School and Magdalene College, Cambridge, both as a scholar. He joined the Bombay-Burma Trading Corporation in Rangoon in 1899, becoming its manager from 1908 to 1921. He was chairman of the Burma Chamber of Commerce from 1918 to 1920.

A member Burma Legislative Council from 1918 to 1920, he became a member of the Council of State of India from 1920 to 1923.

He was appointed a CBE in 1919 and was knighted in 1921. He died at his home in London in 1949.

In 1911, Holberton married Mary Renée, daughter of Judge Romney Kane of Glandree, County Clare; they had a son and two daughters.
