= Maneckji Byramji Dadabhoy =

Indian lawyer and political figure

Sir Maneckji Byramji Dadabhoy, KCSI, KCIE (30 July 1865 – 14 December 1953) was an Indian lawyer, industrialist, and political figure. He was President of the Council of State from 1933 to 1946.

Born into a prominent Parsi family in Bombay, Dadabhoy was educated at the Fort and Proprietary High School and St Xavier's College, before going to England, where he joined the Middle Temple in 1884 and was called to the English bar three years later. He initially practised in at the Bombay High Court, was elected to the Bombay Municipal Corporation, and became a JP in 1888. In 1890, he moved to Nagpur to practise at the Court of the Judicial Commissioner, Central Provinces, where he achieved considerable prominence. He was also a freemason at a lodge at Nagpur.

In parallel with his legal career, he pursued a successful business career and served on several government commissions concerned with finance and economics. He was a governor of the Imperial Bank of India from 1920 to 1932.

In 1908, he was nominated by the Government of the Central Provinces to the Governor-General's Legislative Council. In 1910, he became an elected member of the same body. In 1921, he was elected to the Council of State, to which he was nominated in 1926, 1931, and 1937. He became President of the Council of State in 1932, serving until 1946.

In politics, Dadabhoy was a liberal, a committed but moderate nationalist. He did not support the Indian National Congress' radicalism under Gandhi, and was a frequent, but constructive critic of the British government in India.
