= Imperial Legislative Council =

Legislature issued in the British Raj (1861–1947)

Type
- Type: Unicameral (1861–1919) Bicameral (1919–1947)
- Houses: Council of State (upper); Central Legislative Assembly (lower)
- Term limits: 5 years (Council of State); 3 years (Central Legislative Assembly)

History
- Founded: 1861
- Disbanded: 14 August 1947
- Preceded by: Governor-General's Council
- Succeeded by: Constituent Assembly of India (1946–1950); Constituent Assembly of Pakistan (1947–1956)
- Seats: 60 (Council of States); 145 (Central Legislative Assembly)

Meeting place
- Council House, New Delhi, British India (from 1927)

The Imperial Legislative Council (ILC) was the legislature of British India from 1861 to 1947. It was established under the Government of India Act 1853 (16 & 17 Vict. c. 95) by providing for the addition of six additional members to the Governor General's Council for legislative purposes. Thus, the act separated the legislative and executive functions of the council and it was this body within the Governor General's Council which came to known as the Indian/Central Legislative Council. In 1861 it was renamed as Imperial Legislative Council and the strength was increased. It succeeded the Council of the Governor-General of India, and was succeeded by the Constituent Assembly of India and after 1950, was succeeded by Parliament of India.

During the rule of the East India Company, the council of the governor-general of India had both executive and legislative responsibilities. The council had four members elected by the Court of Directors. The first three members were permitted to participate on all occasions, but the fourth member was only allowed to sit and vote when legislation was being debated. By Government of India Act 1858, the British Crown took over the administration from the East India Company. The Court of Directors of the company, which had the power to elect members of the Governor-General's Council, ceased to have this power. Instead, the one member who had a vote only on legislative questions came to be appointed by the Sovereign, and the other three members by the Secretary of State for India.

== Predecessors ==
The Regulating Act 1773 limited the influence of the Governor-General of India and established the Council of Four, elected by the East India Company's Court of Directors. Pitt's India Act of 1784 reduced the membership to three, and also established the India Board.

== 1861 to 1892 ==
The Indian Councils Act 1861 made several changes to the council's composition. The council was now called the Governor-General's Legislative Council or the Imperial Legislative Council. Three members were to be appointed by the Secretary of State for India, and two by the Sovereign. (The power to appoint all five members passed to the Crown in 1869.) The viceroy was empowered to appoint an additional six to twelve members. The five individuals appointed by the Indian Secretary or Sovereign headed the executive departments, while those appointed by the Governor-General debated and voted on legislation.

=== Indians in the Council ===
There were 45 Indians nominated as additional non-official members from 1862 to 1892. Out of these 25 were zamindars and seven were rulers of princely states. The others were lawyers, magistrates, journalists and merchants. The participation of the Indian members in the council meetings was negligible.

- Raja Sir Deo Narayan Singh of Benaras (Jan 1862–1866)
- Maharaja Narinder Singh of Patiala (Jan 1862 – Nov 1862)
- Dinkar Rao (Jan 1862–1864)
- Yusef Ali Khan, Nawab of Rampur (Sep 1863–1864)
- Maharaja Sir Mirza Gajapati Viziaram, Raj Bahadur of Vizianagram (Jan 1864–1866)(Apr 1872–1876)
- Bir Bar Raja Sir Sahib Dayal of Kishen Kot (Jan 1864–1866)
- Mahtabchand Bahadur, Raja of Burdwan (Nov 1864–1867)
- Kalb Ali Khan, Nawab of Rampur (Jan 1867–)(1878–1887)
- Khwaja Abdul Ghani, Nawab of Dacca (Dec 1867–1869)
- Prasanna Coomar Tagore (Dec 1867–1873)
- Raja Sheoraj Singh of Kashipur (Jan 1868–1870)
- Ram Singh II, Maharaja of Jaipur (Aug 1868–1870) and (Aug 1871–1875)
- Digvijay Singh, Raja of Balrampur (Oct 1868–1870)
- Ramanath Tagore (Feb 1873–1875)
- Raja Shamsher Parkash of Sirmur
- Ishwari Prasad Narayan Singh, Maharaja of Benaras (1876)
- Sir Narendra Krishna Deb (1876)
- Muhammad Faiz Ali Khan, Nawab Bahadur of Pahasu (Dec 1877)
- Syed Ahmad Khan (1878–1882)
- Jatindramohan Tagore (Bengal Zamindars) (1880–1881)
- Raghubir Singh of Jind (1880)
- Raja Sivaprasad of Benaras
- Durga Charan Laha, Maharaja of Shyampukur (1882–1889)
- Kristo Das Pal (1883)
- Syed Ameer Ali (1883–1885)
- Vishvanath Narayan Mandlik (1884–1887)
- Lakshmeshwar Singh (1885–1888)
- Peary Mohan Mukherjea (1885–1888)
- Syud Ameer Hossain (1886–1889)
- Mohammad Amir Hasan Khan (1886)
- Sir Shankar Bakhsh Singh (1886–1888)
- Dinshaw Maneckji Petit (1886–1888)
- Nawab Nawazish Ali Khan (Jul 1887-Sep 1888)
- Pusapati Ananda Gajapati Raju (1888–1889)
- Muhammad Ali Khan (1889–1891)
- Khem Singh Bedi (1889)
- Khwaja Ahsanullah (1890–1892)
- Sir Romesh Chandra Mitra (1890–1891)
- Krishnaji Lakshman Nulkar, Bombay (1890–1891)
- Udai Pratap Singh of Bhinga (1891–1892)
- Rashbihari Ghosh (1892)
- P. Chentsal Rao (1892)

== 1892 to 1909 ==
The Indian Councils Act 1892 increased the number of legislative members with a minimum of ten and maximum of sixteen members. The council now had 6 officials, 5 nominated non-officials, 4 nominated by the provincial legislative councils of Bengal Presidency, Bombay Presidency, Madras Presidency and North-Western Provinces and 1 nominated by the chamber of commerce in Calcutta. The members were allowed to ask questions in the council but not allowed to ask supplementaries or discuss the answer. They were however empowered to discuss the annual financial statement under certain restrictions but could not vote on it.

=== Indians in the Council ===
- Pherozeshah Mehta, Bombay (1893–1896) (1898–1901)
- Lakshmeshwar Singh, Bengal (1893–1898)
- Khem Singh Bedi, Punjab nominated (1893–1897), Punjab (1897–1905)
- Udai Pratap Singh of Bhinga (1893)
- Fazulbhai Vishram, Bombay nominated (1893–)
- Gangadhar Rao Chitnavis, Central Provinces nominated (1893–1909)
- Mir Humayun Jah Bahadur (1893–)
- Rashbihari Ghosh (1894–1908)
- Babu Mohini Mohan Roy (1894)
- P. Ananda Charlu, Madras (1895–1903)
- Rahimtulla M. Sayani, Bombay (1896–1898)
- Nawab Amiruddin Ahmad Khan of Loharu (1897)
- Balwant Rao Bhuskute, Central Provinces (1896–1897)
- Pandit Bishambar Nath (1897)
- Joy Gobind Laha (1897)
- Nawab Faiyaz Ali Khan, Nawab Bahadur of Pahasu, North-West Provinces (1898–1900)
- Rameshwar Singh Bahadur, Bengal nominated (1899–1904), Bengal (1904–)
- Apcar Alexander Apcar, Bengal Chamber of Commerce (1900–1903)
- Syed Hussain Bilgrami (1902–1908)
- Raja Surindar Bikram Prakash Bahadur of Sirmur (1902–1907)
- Aga Khan III, nominated (1903)
- Gopal Krishna Gokhale, Bombay (1903–1909)
- Ernest Cable, Bengal Chamber of Commerce (1903–)
- Rai Sri Ram Bahadur, United Provinces (1903–)
- Bipin Krishna Bose, Central Provinces (1903–)
- Wadero Ghulam Kadir M.B.E Nominated Ratodero Larrkanao(1913)
- Nawab Syed Muhammad Bahadur, Madras (1903–1909)
- Nawab Fateh Ali Khan Kazilbash, Punjab (1904)
- R. G. Bhandarkar (1903)
- Ripudaman Singh (1906–1908)
- Nawab Khwaja Salimullah (1908)
- Asutosh Mookerjee (1908)
- Munshi Madho Lal, United Provinces (1907–1909)
- Theodore Morison (1908)
- Maing Ba Tow (1908)

== 1909 to 1920 ==
The Indian Councils Act 1909 increased the number of members of the Legislative Council to 60, of whom 27 were to be elected. For the first time, Indians were admitted to membership, and there were six Muslim representatives, the first time that such representation had been given to a religious group.

The composition of the council was as follows:

- Ex-officio members from the Viceroy's Executive Council (9)
- Nominated officials (28)
- Nominated non-officials (5): Indian commercial community (1), Punjab Muslims (1), Punjab Landholders (1), Others (2)
- Elected from provincial legislatures (27)
  - General (13): Bombay(2), Madras(2), Bengal(2), United Provinces(2), Central Provinces, Assam, Bihar & Orissa, Punjab, Burma
  - Landholders (6): Bombay, Madras, Bengal, United Provinces, Central Provinces, Bihar & Orissa
  - Muslim (6): Bengal (2), Madras, Bombay, United Provinces, Bihar & Orissa
  - Commerce (2): Bengal Chamber of Commerce (1), Bombay Chamber of Commerce

== Indians in the Council (1909–20) ==
=== Nominated Officials ===
- Kiran Chandra De

=== Nominated Non-Officials ===
- Surendranath Banerjee (1913–1920), Raja Peary Mohan Mukherjee (1915), Sir Fazalbhoy Currimbhoy Ebrahim (−1920), Ratanji Dadabhoy Tata (1920)

=== Bengal ===
- General: Sachchidananda Sinha (1910–12), Bhupendra Nath Bose (1911–19), Lalit Mohan Chatterjee, Rai Sita Nath Ray Bahadur (1916–19)
- Muslims: Syed Shamsul Huda (1911–15), Abdul Karim Ghaznavi (1911), Maulvi Abdul Rahim (1916–1919), Nawab Bahadur Syed Nawab Ali Chowdhury (1916–20)
- Landholders: Bijoy Chand Mahtab (1909–12), Manindra Chandra Nandy (1916–19)

=== Bihar & Orissa ===
- General: Sachchidananda Sinha (1912–20), Madhusudan Das (1913), Rai Bahadur Krishna Sahay (1916–1919)
- Muslims: Maulana Mazharul Haque (1910–11), Syed Ali Imam (1912) Quamrul Huda (1915), Mohammad Yunus (1916)
- Landholders: Rajendra Narayan Bhanja Deo Raja of Kanika (1916–1920)

=== Bombay ===
- General: Gopal Krishna Gokhale (1909–1915), Vithalbhai Patel (1912), Dinshaw Edulji Wacha (1916–1920), Lallubhai Samaldas, Pheroze Sethna, Sir Vithaldas Thackersey
- Muslim: Muhammad Ali Jinnah (1910–1911) and (1916–1919), Ghulam Muhammad Khan Bhurgri (1911–1912), Ibrahim Rahimtoola (1913–1919), Sir Shah Nawaz Bhutto
- Landholders: Sir Sassoon David, 1st Baronet (1910), Wadero Ghulam Kadir Dayo 1913 1914, Khan Bahadur Saiyed Allahondo Shah (1916–1919)

=== Burma ===
- General: Maung Mye (1915), Maing Ba Tu (1911–1920)

=== Central Provinces ===
- General: Sir Maneckji Byramji Dadabhoy (1911–1917), Raghunath Narasinha Mudholkar (1911–1912), V. R. Pandit, General (1915), Ganesh Shrikrishna Khaparde (1918–1920), Rai Sahib Seth Nath Mal
- Landholders: Sir Gangadhar Rao Chitnavis (1893–1916), Pandit Bishan Dutt Shukul (1916–1919)

=== East Bengal & Assam ===
- General: Kamini Kumar Chanda (1920)
- Landholders: Pramathanath Roy, Raja of Dighapatia (1911–1915)

=== Madras ===
- General: N. Subba Rao Pantulu (1910–1913), C. Vijayaraghavachariar (1913–1916), V. S. Srinivasa Sastri (1916–1919), B. N. Sarma (1916–1919), Kurma Venkata Reddy Naidu (1920), T. Rangachari, M. Ct. Muthiah Chettiar
- Muslim: Ghulam Muhammad Ali Khan (1910–1913), Nawab Syed Muhammad Bahadur (1909–1919), Khan Bahadur Mir Asad Ali (1916–1919)
- Landholders: Veerabhadra Raju Bahadur (1912), Raja of Panagal (1912–1915), K. V. Rangaswamy Iyengar (1916–1919)

=== Punjab ===
- General: Raja Sir Daljit Singh (1913–1915), Sir Ranbir Singh of Patiala (1915), Dewan Tek Chand (1915–1917), Sundar Singh Majithia (1917–1920)
- Muslims: Nawab Sir Zulfikar Ali Khan Of Malerkotla (1910–1920), Muhammad Shafi (1917)
- Landholders: Pratap Singh of Kapurthala (1910–1911), Col. Raja Jai Chand, Sir Malik Umar Hayat Khan (1911–1920)
- Chiefs : Sultan Karam Dad Khan of Pharwala (1918)

=== United Provinces ===
- General: Madan Mohan Malaviya (1911–1919), Bishan Narayan Dar (1914–1920), Tej Bahadur Sapru (1916–1919)
- Muslims: Sir Mohammad Ali Mohammad Khan Raja of Mahmudabad (1909–1912), Nawab Abdul Majid (1912), Nawab Mohammad Ismail Khan
- Landholders: Raja Sir Rampal Singh of Kurri Sudauli

== 1920 to 1947 ==
Under the Government of India Act 1919, the Imperial Legislative Council was converted into a bicameral legislature with the Imperial Legislative Assembly (also known as the Central Legislative Assembly) as the lower house of a bicameral legislature and the Council of State as the upper house, reviewing legislation passed by the Assembly. The Governor-General nonetheless retained significant power over legislation. He could authorise the expenditure of money without the Legislature's consent for "ecclesiastical, political [and] defence" purposes, and for any purpose during "emergencies". He was permitted to veto, or even stop debate on, any bill. If he recommended the passage of a bill, but only one chamber co-operated, he could declare the bill passed over the objections of the other chamber. The legislature had no authority over foreign affairs and defence. The President of the Council of State was appointed by the Governor-General; the Central Legislative Assembly elected its own President, apart from the first, but the election required the Governor-General's approval.

Under the Indian Independence Act 1947, the Imperial Legislative Council and its houses were dissolved on 14 August 1947 and was replaced by the Constituent Assembly of India and the Constituent Assembly of Pakistan.

== See also ==
- Supreme Council of Bengal
- India Board
- Secretary of State for India
- East India Company
- Council of India
- Council of State (India)
- Viceroy's Executive Council
- Central Legislative Assembly
- Interim Government of India
- List of acts of the Parliament of India
