= 1921 New Year Honours =

British royal recognitions

The New Year Honours 1921 were appointments by King George V to various orders and honours to reward and highlight good works by members of the British Empire. They were published on 31 December 1920.

The recipients of honours are displayed here as they were styled before their new honour, and arranged by honour, with classes (Knight, Knight Grand Cross, etc.) and then divisions (Military, Civil, etc.) as appropriate.

== British Empire ==
=== Baron ===
- Sir William Beardmore, Bart., chairman and managing director of William Beardmore & Co., Ltd.; Chairman of the Industrial Welfare Society. For public services.
- Sir Ernest Cable, Ex-President of Bengal Chamber of Commerce; Ex-Sheriff of Calcutta. Prominently identified with development of India.
- Mathew Lewis Vaughan-Davies, JP, DL, MP, Member of Parliament for Cardiganshire for 26 years.
- The Right Honourable Sir Horace Brooks Marshall, KCVO, , , Lord Mayor of London 1918–19. For public services.
- Colonel James Alexander Francis Humberston Stewart-Mackenzie of Seaforth, late 9th Lancers, JP, DL, Vice-Lieutenant for Ross and Cromarty, and Chairman of the Territorial Force since its inception; Honorary Colonel, 1/4th Seaforth Highlanders.

=== Privy Councillor ===
- William Lehman Ashmead Bartlett Burdett-Coutts, MP, Member of Parliament for Westminster since 1885.

Ireland

- Edward Mervyn Archdale, JP, DL, MP, Member of Parliament for North Fermanagh.
- Alderman Sir Andrew Beattie, JP, DL, Ex-High Sheriff of Dublin City, Commissioner of National Education, Ireland.
- The Reverend Thomas Hamilton, , . For long and successful service to the cause of education in Ireland. First as President of Queens College, Belfast, subsequently as president and Vice-Chancellor of the Queens University of Belfast.
- Andrew Jameson, Ex-Governor, Bank of Ireland, Chairman of Irish Lights Commission.

=== Baronet ===
- Sir Archibald Birkmyre, CBE, late Member of the Viceroy of India's Legislative Council and the Bengal Legislative Council; Vice President of the Bengal Chamber of Commerce. For public services.
- Albert Edward Bowen, President of the Buenos Aires Great Southern Railway, Ex-High Sheriff of Bedfordshire. For public services on many Government War Committees.
- Admiral Sir Cecil Burney, GCMG, KCB. For war services.
- Commander August Bernard Tellefsen Cayzer, Chairman of the Clan Line of steamers. For public and national services.
- Rear-Admiral Sir Walter Cowan, KCB, DSO, MVO. For war services.
- Reginald Henry Cox, JP, DL, Senior Partner in Messrs. Cox & Co., Bankers and Agents to the British Army for over a century and a half, JP and Deputy-Lieutenant for Berkshire and Ex-High-Sheriff of that county. For public services.
- James Hamet Dunn. For public services rendered to the Government during the War.
- Colonel Sir William Thomas Dupree, JP, DL, for several years Mayor of Portsmouth. For municipal and local services.
- Frederick Eley, General Manager and a Director of the National Provincial and Union Bank of England Ltd. For public services.
- Sven Wohlford Hansen, Chairman of Hansen Shipbuilding and Ship-repairing Co. Ltd., which revived the shipbuilding industry in Bideford (after 50 years lapse). For public and local services.
- Colonel Sir Joseph Hewitt. For notable services rendered in the Coal Controllers Department.
- Sir Samuel Hill Hill-Wood, JP, DL, MP, Member of Parliament for High Peak Division, Derbyshire. For local services.
- Rowland Frederick William Hodge, Founder of Northumberland Shipbuilding Company; Chairman of Eltringhams Ltd. For public services, particularly in connection with shipbuilding.
- George Harry Holcroft, JP. For notable services in Birmingham, particularly in connection with the university.
- Trehawke Herbert Kekewich, JP, Chairman of Devon Quarter Sessions, Recorder of Tiverton for over 20 years. For national services.
- Donald Macmaster, KC, MP, Member of Parliament for Chertsey Division, Surrey, since 1910.
- Frederick Mills, JP, DL, Deputy Lieutenant for the county of Monmouth; Chairman of the Ebbw Vale Steel & Iron Company and of the Ebbw Vale Industrial Council. For public and local services.
- Bernard Oppenheimer. For work in connection with the inauguration of diamond polishing for discharged and disabled soldiers.
- Lieutenant-General Sir Robert Stephenson Smyth Baden-Powell, KCB, KCVO, , Founder of the Boy Scout Movement.
- Henry Samman, Honorary Elder Brother, Trinity House, Hull; Chairman of the Shipping Section of the Hull Chamber of Commerce. For public services.
- Colonel Charles Edward Yate, CSI, CMG, DL, MP, Member of Parliament for Melton Division. For public services.

=== Knight Bachelor ===
- Ivor Algernon Atkins, Mus.Doc., (Oxon), FRCO, Organist of Worcester Cathedral. Conductor of the Three Choirs Festival.
- Reginald Blair, MP, Member of Parliament for Bow and Bromley. For public services.
- Thomas Jewell Bennett, CIE, MP, Member of Parliament for Sevenoaks Division. For many years Editor of The Times of India. For public services.
- Richard Dawson Bates, OBE. For public and local services.
- James Bell, Jr., Member of Shipping Committee of the Hull Chamber of Commerce and of Humber Conservancy Board. For public and local services.
- Samuel Barrow, JP, Member of Trade Committee dealing with trade reconstruction after the war. For public and local services in Surrey.
- Lieutenant-Colonel Henry Baldwin Barton, JP, Mayor of Finsbury since 1911. For public and local services.
- Wilfred Denham, Author and Writer.
- John Daniel, Member of the Cardiff City Council and Education Committees; President of the Cardiff Cymmrodorion and Chairman of the Glamorganshire Branch of the National Union of Welsh Societies. For public and local services.
- William Davies, Editor of the Western Mail, Cardiff.
- Andrew Rae Duncan, Coal Controller since October 1919.
- Henry Foreman, OBE, MP, Member of Parliament for North Hammersmith; for many years Mayor of Hammersmith. For municipal and local services.
- John Charles Fox, Senior Master of the Supreme Court, Chancery Division.
- Captain Francis John Childs Ganzoni, MP, Member of Parliament for Ipswich. For public services.
- Charles Frederick Gill, KC, Recorder of Chichester.
- Councillor William Hopwood, JP. For public and local services in Lancashire.
- John Martin-Harvey, Actor.
- William Hodgson. For public services in Crewe.
- Alexander McAusland Kennedy, JP, President of the Shipbuilding Employers Federation of Great Britain; served on several Government advisory committees during the War. For public and local services.
- Harry Vernon Kilvert, JP. For public and local services in Cheshire.
- Professor Peter Redford Scott Lang. For over 40 years Professor of Mathematics in St. Andrew's University. For public services.
- Richard Roope Linthorne, Town Clerk of Southampton for 22 years. For public and local services.
- John Mitchell, Provost of Ayr during the whole of the war. For municipal and local services.
- William Edgar Nicholls, JP, Director of Barclay's Bank. For public services.
- Ernest Fitzjohn Oldham, Deputy Chairman of the Federation of British Industries. For public services.
- Thomas David Owen. For public and local services in Merseyside, and for services in connection with the University College of North Wales.
- Major William Reid, MBE, Chairman of Board of Management of Royal Glasgow Asylum for the Blind. For public and local services.
- Charles Ryall, CBE, FRCS, Senior Surgeon to the Cancer Hospital and to the Bolingbroke Hospital. For public services.
- John Ross,, Treasurer of the Carnegie University (Scotland) Trust, Chairman of Carnegie (UK) Trust and Hero Fund. For public services.
- Thomas Rowbotham, Mayor of Stockport 1916–18. For public and local services.
- His Honour Judge Walworth Howland Roberts, County Court Judge of Marylebone.
- William Peter Rylands, President of the Federation of British Industries.
- Edwin Savill, Chartered surveyor
- Harold Smith, MP, Member of Parliament for Warrington.
- Samuel Squire Sprigge, , MRCS, Editor of The Lancet.
- Edwin Forsyth Stockton, Governor of Manchester University. For local and public services.
- Alderman William Wade, JP, Lord Mayor of Bradford, 1919–20; Member of the Bradford Chamber of Commerce. For public and local services.
- Professor James Walker, Professor of Chemistry, University of Edinburgh.
- Captain Lionel de Lautour Wells, CB, CMG, CBE, Royal Navy, late Chief Officer Metropolitan Fire Brigade. For public services.
- Dawson Williams, , FRCP, Editor of the British Medical Journal.
- Richard John Williams. Mayor of Bangor, 1913–20. For public and local services.
- Arthur Worley, CBE, General Manager of the North British and Mercantile Insurance Company. For public services.

Ireland

- Edward Coey Bigger, MD, MCh, Chairman of Public Health Council and Medical Member of Local Government Board, Ireland.
- Henry Campbell, Town Clerk of Dublin for many years.
- Robert Meyer, Town Clerk of Belfast.
- Ernest Godwin Swifte, KC, Chief Metropolitan Police Magistrate in Dublin for many years.

India

- George Herman Collier, CIE, Director-General of Stores, India Office.
- Thomas Walker Arnold, CIE, , lately Educational Adviser for Indian Students to the Secretary of State.
- Mr. Justice Brod Bahadur Shadi Lal, Barrister-at-Law, Chief Justice, High Court, Punjab.
- Surendra Nath Banerjea, Elected Member of the Viceroy's Legislative Council.
- Gokaldas Kahandas Parekh, Pleader, Bombay.
- Montagu de Pomeroy Webb, CIE, CBE, Merchant, Karachi, Bombay.
- Alexander Robertson Murray, CBE, Senior Partner, Messrs. Thomas Duff & Company, Calcutta, President, Chamber of Commerce.
- Khan Bahadur Mirza Abdul Husain Sahib, Sheriff of Madras.
- Marakjee Byramjee Dadabhoy, CIE, Barrister-at-Law, Nagpur, Central Provinces.
- Thomas Smith, VD, Manager, Muir Mails Company, Cawnpore, United Provinces.
- Rai Bahadur Hari Ram Goenka, CIE, Merchant and Landholder, Bengal.

Dominions, Crown Colonies, Protectorates, etc.

- The Honourable Theophilus Cooper, a Judge of the Supreme Court of New Zealand.
- Frederick Dutton, Honorary Treasurer, Royal Colonial Institute.
- Henry Cowper Gollan, CBE, Attorney-General of the Island of Ceylon.
- Alexander Jarvie Hood, MB, of Sydney, Senior Honorary Physician at the Prince of Wales (Military) Hospital, Randwick, State of New South Wales.
- George Hunter, Member of the House of Representatives, Dominion of New Zealand. Has rendered valuable assistance in connection with the settlement of returned soldiers.
- The Honourable Edward Lucas, Agent-General in London for the State of South Australia.
- The Honourable John Emanuel Mackey, LLB, Speaker of the Legislative Assembly of the State of Victoria.
- Pietro James Michelli, CMG, Secretary to the London School of Tropical Medicine.
- Ernest Oppenheimer, Honorary Secretary to the South African War Memorial Fund. Took a leading part in recruiting, both of combatants and labourers, for various fronts during the War.
- Michel Angelo Refalo, CBE, LLD, the Chief Justice and President of His Majesty's Court of Appeal for the Island of Malta.
- Newton John Stabb, OBE, Chief Manager of The Hongkong and Shanghai Banking Corporation, Hong Kong. For services on behalf of British trade and interests in the Far East.
- Henry Strakosch. For financial services to the Union of South Africa in connection with the War.

=== Order of the Bath ===
==== Knight Grand Cross of the Order of the Bath (GCB) ====
Military Division

Royal Navy

- Admiral Louis Alexander Mountbatten, Marquess of Milford Haven, GCB (Civil), GCVO, KCMG.
- Admiral Sir Frederick Charles Doveton Sturdee, Bart, KCB, KCMG, CVO.
- Admiral Sir John Michael de Robeck, Bart, GCMG, KCB.

==== Knight Commander of the Order of the Bath (KCB) ====
Military Division

Royal Navy

- Vice-Admiral Laurence Eliot Bower CB, CVO.

Army

- Major-General (Honorary Lieutenant-General) Michael Frederic Rimington, CB, CVO (Colonel, 6th Dragoons), Retired Pay.
- Major-General Robert Porter, CB, CMG, MB, Retired Pay.
- Major-General Layton John Blenkinsop, CB, DSO, Director General, Army Veterinary Service, War Office.
- Major-General Sir Vere Bonamy Fane, KCIE, CB.

Civil Division

- Vincent Wilberforce Baddeley, CB.
- Brigadier-General William Thomas Francis Horwood, CB, DSO, Commissioner of Metropolitan Police.

==== Companion of the Order of the Bath (CB) ====
Military Division

Royal Navy

- Rear-Admiral Maurice Swynfen Fitzmaurice, CMG.
- Lieutenant-Colonel Walter Thomas Creswell Jones, DSO, Royal Marines Light Infantry.

Army

- Major-General Weir de Lancy Williams, CMG, DSO.
- Major-General Alfred Alexander Kennedy, CMG.
- Colonel (temporary Colonel on the Staff) John Constantine Gordon Longmore, CMG, CBE, DSO, Brigadier-General i/c Administration, Egypt.
- Colonel Albemarle Bertie Edward Cator, DSO, Officer Commanding, Scots Guards and Regimental District.
- Colonel Llewelyn Alberic Emilius Price-Davies, VC, CMG, DSO, ADC, Assistant Adjutant-General, Aldershot Command.
- Colonel (temporary Major-General) Ivo Lucius Beresford Vesey, CMG, DSO, Director of Organisation, War Office.
- Colonel (temporary Colonel-Commandant) Cuthbert Henry Tindall Lucas, CMG, DSO, Brigade Commander, 16th Infantry Brigade, Irish Command.
- Colonel (temporary Major-General, Canadian Forces) Harry Macintire Elliot, CMG, Master General of Ordnance, Canadian Forces.
- Colonel Sisley Richard Davidson, CMG.
- Colonel Herbert Josè Pierson Browne.
- Colonel Herbert Evan Charles Bayley Nepean, CSI, CMG.

Civil Division

- Rear-Admiral Herbert William Richmond.
- Captain Aubrey Smith, MVO, Royal Navy.
- The Right Reverend Bishop John Taylor Smith, CVO.
- Colonel John Stollery, VD, late Royal Field Artillery (Territorial Force).
- Colonel Gilbert Ormerod Spence, DSO, TD, 5th Battalion, Durham Light Infantry.
- Lieutenant-Colonel Alan Francis Maclure, TD, Territorial Force Reserve, 7th Battalion, Lancashire Fusiliers.
- Lieutenant-Colonel James Craig, TD, Territorial Force Reserve, 7th Battalion, Argyll and Sutherland Highlanders.
- Walter St. David Jenkins, CBE, Director of Contracts, Admiralty.
- Basil Edward Holloway, Director of Finance (Materials), Air Ministry.
- Edward Henry Pelham, Principal Assistant Secretary, Board of Education.
- Maurice Linford Gwyer, Solicitor, Ministry of Health.
- Lieutenant-Colonel John Wallace Pringle, Royal Engineers, Chief Inspecting Officer of Railways, Ministry of Transport.
- Otto Ernst Niemeyer, Principal Assistant Secretary, Treasury.
- Nathaniel Francis Banner Osborn, deputy director of Contracts, War Office.
- Philip Francis Wood, KC, Official Draftsman, Scottish Office.

=== Order of the Star of India ===
==== Knight Grand Commander of the Order of the Star of India (GCSI) ====
Additional Knights Grand Commanders, in recognition of the services rendered by the Native States of India during the War.

- Lieutenant-Colonel His Highness Maharaja Sir Prabhu Narayan Singh Bahadur, GCIE, Maharaja of Benares.
- Major-General His Highness Farzand-i-Khas-i-Daulet-i-Inglishia Mansur-i-Zaman Amar-ul-Umra Maharajadhiraja Rajeshwar Sri Maharaja-i-Rajagan Sir Bhupindar Singh Mahindar Bahadur, GCIE, GBE, Maharaja of Patiala.

==== Knight Commander of the Order of the Star of India (KCSI) ====
- Sir Edward Douglas MacLagan, KCIE, CSI, Governor-Designate of the Punjab.
- The Right Honourable Sir Satyendra Prassano, Baron Sinha of Raipur, KC, Governor of Bihar and Orissa.
- Sir Nicholas Dodd Beatson-Bell, KCIE, CSI, Governor-Designate of Assam.
- Sir William Sinclair Marris, KCIE, Governor-Designate of Assam (in succession to Sir Nicholas Beatson-Bell).
- Louis James Kershaw, CSI, CIE, Indian Civil Service, Secretary in the Revenue and Statistics Department, India Office.
- George Seymour Curtis, CSI, Indian Civil Service, Member of the Executive Council of the Governor of Bombay.
- Lionel Davidson, CSI, Indian Civil Service, Member of the Executive Council of the Governor of Madras.

==== Companion of the Order of the Star of India (CSI) ====
- Henry Mayne Reid Hopkins, Indian Civil Service, Senior Member, Board of Revenue, United Provinces.
- Robert Arthur Graham, Indian Civil Service, Chief Secretary to the Government of Madras.
- Percy James Mead, Indian Civil Service, Secretary to Government, Revenue Department (lately Chief Secretary), Bombay.
- George Rainy, CIE, Indian Civil Service, Chief Secretary to Government, Bihar and Orissa.
- Geoffrey Rothe Clarke, OBE, Indian Civil Service, Director-General of Posts and Telegraphs.
- Douglas Donald, CIE, on special duty as Political Officer for Orakzais, North-West Frontier Province.
- Khan Bahadur Sardar Muhammad Ali Khan Kazilbash, vice-president of the Municipal Committee and Honorary Magistrate, Lahore.

Additional Companion, in recognition of the services rendered by the Native States of India during the War.

- Nawabzada Haji Muhammad Hamidulla Khan, third son of Her Highness the Begum of Bhopal.

=== Order of Saint Michael and Saint George ===
==== Knight Grand Cross of the Order of St Michael and St George (GCMG) ====
- Brigadier-General Sir William Henry Manning, KCMG, KBE, CB, Governor and Commander-in-Chief of the Island of Ceylon.

==== Knight Commander of the Order of St Michael and St George (KCMG) ====
- Major Harry Edward Spiller Cordeaux, CB, CMG, Governor and Commander-in-Chief of the Bahama Islands.
- The Right Honourable Adrian Knox, LLB, CMG, Chief Justice of the High Court of Australia.
- Albert Edward Stephenson, CMG, Director of Colonial Audit.
- Sir Alexander George Boyle, CMG, CBE, lately a Lieutenant-Governor in the Protectorate of Nigeria.
- Ernest James Lennox Berkeley, CB, lately His Majesty's Consul-General at Tunis.
- Sir Harold Arthur Stuart, KCSI, KCVO, lately British High Commissioner on the Inter-Allied Rhineland High Commission.

Honorary Knight Commander

- His Highness Paduka Sri Sultan Iskandar Shah ibni Almerhum Sultan Idris, Sultan of Perak.

==== Companion of the Order of St Michael and St George (CMG) ====
- William Cecil Bottomley, OBE, of the Colonial Office.
- Ernest Augustus Boxer, President of the New Zealand Returned Soldiers Association.
- Ernest Marshall Owen Clough, Clerk of the House and Taxing Officer, Senate of the Union of South Africa.
- Illtyd Buller Pole-Evans, BSc, Chief of the Division of Botany and Plant Pathology, Department of Agriculture, Union of South Africa.
- The Honourable William James George, Minister for Public Works, and Trading Concerns and Water Supply, State of Western Australia.
- Gavin Macaulay Hamilton, MVO, lately Secretary to the Governor-General and Commander-in-Chief of the Dominion of New Zealand.
- The Honourable John Blyth Hayes, Minister for Works, State of Tasmania.
- Edward Charles Long, Principal Medical Officer, Basutoland.
- Major Charles William James Orr, Royal Artillery, Colonial Secretary, Gibraltar.
- Thomas Edmund Rice, Director of the Medical and Sanitary Service, Nigeria.
- Henry Getty Chilton, a Counsellor of Embassy in His Majesty's Diplomatic Service.
- Major James Hugh Hamilton Dodds, His Majesty's Chargé d'affaires at Addis Ababa.
- Reginald Walter Matthew, a Director in the Department of Overseas Trade.

=== Order of the Indian Empire ===
==== Knight Grand Commander of the Order of the Indian Empire (GCIE) ====
- His Highness Maharaja Sir Ugyen Wangchuck, KCSI, KCIE, Maharaja of Bhutan.

Additional Knight Grand Commander, in recognition of the services rendered by the Native States of India during the War.

- Lieutenant-Colonel His Highness Farzand-i-Dilband Rasikh-ul-Itikad Daulat-i-Inglishia Raja-i-Rajagan Maharaja Sir Jagatjit Singh Bahadur, GCSI, Maharaja of Kapurthala.

==== Knight Commander of the Order of the Indian Empire (KCIE) ====
- Henry Robert Conway Dobbs, CSI, CIE, Indian Civil Service, Foreign Secretary to the Government of India.
- Thakore Saheb Dolatsinhji Jesvantsinhji, Thakore Saheb of Limbdi, Ruling Chief, 2nd Class, Bombay.
- Sardar Bahadur Sardar Arur Singh, CIE, Manager, Golden Temple, Amritsar, Punjab.
- Henry Ashbrooke Crump, CSI, Indian Civil Service, Financial Commissioner, Central Provinces.

Additional Knights Commanders, in recognition of the services rendered by the Native States of India during the War.

- Lieutenant-Colonel His Highness Maharaja Sir Amar Parkash Bahadur, KCSI, Maharaja of Sirmur.
- Lieutenant-Colonel His Highness Nawab Sir Ahmad Ali Khan Bahadur, KCSI, Nawab of Maler Kotla.

==== Companion of the Order of the Indian Empire (CIE) ====
- Khan Bahadur Sayyid Mehdi Shah, OBE, Honorary Magistrate and Member of the Legislative Council of the Lieutenant-Governor of the Punjab.
- Diwan Bahadur Diwan Daulat Rai, Barrister-at-Law, Rawalpindi, and Member of the Legislative Council of the Lieutenant-Governor of the Punjab.
- Michael Keane, Indian Civil Service, Chief Secretary to Government, United Provinces.
- Sir James David Sifton, Indian Civil Service, Financial Secretary to Government, Bihar and Orissa.
- Lieutenant-Colonel Philip Sykes Murphy Burlton, Indian Army, Commissioner, Jullundur Division, Punjab.
- Charles Morgan Webb, Indian Civil Service, Chief Secretary to the Government of Burma.
- David Thomas Chadwick, Indian Civil Service, Indian Trade Commissioner, London.
- Harry William Maclean Ives, Chief Engineer and Secretary to the Government of the Punjab, Public Works Department, Irrigation Branch, Punjab.
- Charles Maurice Baker, Indian Civil Service, Collector, Bombay.
- William Alexander Marr, Indian Civil Service, Magistrate and Collector, Rungpur, Bengal.
- Geoffrey Latham Corbett, Indian Civil Service, Deputy Secretary, Commerce Department, Government of India.
- Major Edmund Henry Salt James, Indian Political Department, Deputy Commissioner, Hazara.
- John Tudor Gwynn, Indian Civil Service, Publicity Officer, Madras.
- Lieutenant-Colonel David Macdonald Davidson, Indian Medical Service, Civil Surgeon, Lahore, Punjab.
- Lieutenant-Colonel Frederick O'Kinealy, Indian Medical Service, Surgeon Superintendent, Presidency General Hospital, Calcutta, Bengal.
- Lieutenant-Colonel William Frederick Harvey, Indian Medical Service, Director, Central Research Institute, Kasauli, Punjab.
- Lieutenant-Colonel Lionel Augustus Grimston, VD, OBE, Commanding the 6th Assam Valley Light Horse (I.A.F.), Assam.
- Lieutenant-Colonel John Lawrence Van Geyzel, late Indian Medical Service, Examiner of Medical Stores, India Store Depot.
- Major and Brevet Lieutenant-Colonel Sydney Frederick Muspratt, DSO, Indian Army, General Staff Officer, First Grade, Army Headquarters.
- Major Henry George Vaux, Military Secretary to His Excellency the Governor of Bengal.
- Arthur Charles Rumboll, OBE, Acting Agent, Great Indian Peninsula Railway.
- Hugh Charles Sampson, deputy director of Agriculture, V and VII Circles, Coimbatore, Madras.
- Dr. Edwin John Butler, Imperial Mycologist, Pusa.
- Alexander Waddell Dods, (Major, Calcutta Port Defence Artillery), Partner, Messrs. Burn & Co., Calcutta, Bengal.
- Dadiba Merwanji Dalal, Justice of the Peace, Bombay.
- Rai Bahadur Gopal Das Bhandari, MBE, Advocate and Municipal Commissioner, Amritsar, Punjab.
- Rai Bahadur Jadu Nath Mazumdar, chairman, District Board, Jessore, Bengal.
- Jehangir B. Murzban, Journalist, Bombay.
- Narayan Molhar Joshi, Servants of India Society, Bombay.
- Hamid Khan, Assistant Political Officer, Najaf, Mesopotamia.
- Harry Evan Auguste Cotton. Formerly Advocate of the High Court of Calcutta, Member of the London County Council.
- Frank Herbert Brown, Journalist, formerly of Bombay.

Additional Companion, in recognition of the services rendered by the Native States of India during the War.

- Jalal-ud-Daula Nawab Muhammad Khurshaid Ali Khan Bahadur, Mustakil-i-Jang, CBE, Nawab of Dujana.

=== Order of the British Empire ===
==== Knight Grand Cross of the Order of the British Empire (GBE) ====
Military Division

- Lieutenant-General Sir Richard Cyril Byrne Haking, KCB, KCMG.
- Honorary Major-General His Highness Maharaja Raj Rajeshawar Siromani Sri Sir Ganga Singh Bahadur, GCSI, GCIE, GCVO, KCB, ADC, Maharaja of Bikaner. For valuable services rendered during the War.

=== Order of the Companions of Honour (CH) ===
- The Reverend John Clifford, MA, DD, BSc.
- Sir John Reeves Ellerman, Bart.

=== Kaisar-i- Hind Medal ===
First Class

- Sir Pramada Charan Banerji, Kt., Puisne Judge of the High Court of Allahabad.
- Joseph Vas, Indian Civil Service, Magistrate and Collector, Bankuar, Bengal.
- Rai Bahadur Sakhi Chand, Superintendent of Police, Puri, Bihar and Orissa.
- M. R. Ry. Diwan Bahadur Agaram Subbarayalu Reddiyar Garu, President of the South Arcot District Board, Madras.
- M. R. Ry. Diwan Bahadur Mocherla Ramachandta Rao Pantulu Garu, President of the Kistna District Board, Madras.
- Francis Ernest Morrison, Vice-chairman, Bhagalpur District Board, Bihar and Orissa.
- Reverend William Somers Sutherland, Missionary, of Kalimpong, Bengal.
- Annette Matilda Benson, MD, BSc, formerly Senior Physician, Cama & Albless Hospital, Bombay.
- Maung Ba Oh (alias Ahmed Ulla), Timber Merchant and Raft Agent to the Bombay, Burma Trading Corporation Limited, Rangoon, Burma.

=== Royal Victorian Order ===
==== Knight Grand Cross of the Royal Victorian Order (GCVO) ====
- His Royal Highness the Duke of York, KG.
- The Right Honourable Adelbert Wellington Brownlow, Earl Brownlow.
- The Right Honourable Sir Frederick Edward Grey Ponsonby, KCB, KCVO.
- Captain The Honourable Sir William Charles Wentworth Fitzwilliam, KCVO.

==== Knight Commander of the Royal Victorian Order (KCVO) ====
- The Right Reverend Bertram Pollock, CVO, Lord Bishop of Norwich.
- The Right Reverend Bishop Herbert Edward Ryle, CVO, Dean of Westminster.
- The Honourable Sir Charles Russell, Bart.
- Sir Lionel Earle, KCB, CMG.
- Frederick Stanley Hewett, MVO.

==== Commander of the Royal Victorian Order (CVO) ====
- Sir William Barclay Peat.
- The Very Reverend Albert Victor Baillie, Dean of Windsor.
- Colonel Stratford Edward St. Leger, CMG, DSO.
- William Richard Codling, CBE, MVO.
- Captain John Hampden Waller, MVO, of the Honourable Corps of Gentlemen at Arms.
- William Fairbank, MVO, OBE.
- Major Philip Hunloke, MVO.

==== Member of the Royal Victorian Order, 4th class (MVO) ====
- Captain James Murray Pipon, OBE, Royal Navy.
- Lieutenant-Colonel Christopher Middlemass Davidson, of the Honourable Corps of Gentlemen at Arms.
- Lieutenant-Commander Martin John Coucher de Meric, Royal Navy (Dated 8 August 1920).
- Richard John Frederick Edgcumbe.
- William Henry Massey.

==== Member of the Royal Victorian Order, 5th class (MVO) ====
- Arthur Clement Beck.
- Captain Andrew Benbow.
- William Stewart MacWilliam.
- Richard Philip.
- Superintendent Stephen Frederick Spencer, Metropolitan Police.
- Frederick John Worledge.

=== King's Police Medal (KPM) ===
England

- Harry Philip Parnell Lane, CBE, MVO, Chief Constable of Lancashire.
- Frederick Brindley, Chief Constable, Stockport Borough Police.
- George Henry Barker, Assistant Chief Constable, Sheffield City Police.
- Joseph Crisp, Superintendent and Deputy Chief Constable, East Riding of Yorkshire Constabulary.
- Henry Barraclough, Superintendent, West Riding of Yorkshire Constabulary.
- Thomas Sheridan, Superintendent, Newcastle and Tyne City Police.
- James Ravenhall, Superintendent and Deputy Chief Constable, Warwickshire Constabulary.
- William Ritchie, Inspector, Cumberland and Westmorland Constabulary.
- Joseph Hutchinson, Inspector, Lincolnshire Constabulary.
- William Kenward, Inspector, Surrey Constabulary.
- Walter Henry Southey, Inspector, Dover Borough Police.
- Robert Lewis Bertram, Sergeant, Cumberland and Westmorland Constabulary.
- Leslie Cross, Sergeant, Lincolnshire Constabulary.
- John Abbott, Sergeant, Metropolitan Police.
- Thomas James Brown, Sergeant, Lancashire Constabulary.
- Thomas Brown, Police Constable, Liverpool City Police.
- James Fox, Police Constable, Liverpool City Police.
- Alfred Isaac Fulton, Police Constable, Cumberland and Westmorland Constabulary.
- Charles Rodwell, Police Constable, Lincolnshire Constabulary.
- Francis Douglas Sinton, Police Constable, Northumberland Constabulary.
- Bertram Allison, Police Constable, Metropolitan Police.
- Percy Sweet, Police Constable, Metropolitan Police.
- Alexander Jaffray, Police Constable, Metropolitan Police.
- Wallace Churchyard, Police Constable, Metropolitan Police.
- George Day, Police Constable, Metropolitan Police.
- Harry Hayes, Police Constable, Metropolitan Police.
- Harry Berry, Police Constable, Port of London Police.

Fire Brigade

- Allbert Mildon, Superintendent, London Fire Brigade.
- James William Spurgeon, Sub-Officer, London Fire Brigade.
- Arthur William Fenner, Fireman, London Fire Brigade.
- George Sluman, Pilot, London Fire Brigade.
- Samuel Penn, Police Inspector and Second Officer, Wolverhampton Fire Brigade.

Scotland

- William Dawson Paterson, Assistant Chief Constable, Edinburgh City Police.
- William Millar Douglas, Superintendent, Glasgow City Police.
- Lachlan McTavish, Police Constable, Renfrew Constabulary.

Fire Brigade

- John McGregor, Senior Superintendent, Glasgow Fire Brigade.

India

- James Walter Macleod North, Inspector, Madras City Police.
- Amudur Varadarajulu Nayudu Govindarajulu Nayudu, Head Constable, Madras City Police.
- Muhammad Kalimullah Sahib Chida, Khan Sahib, Deputy Superintendent, Madras City Police.
- Kannampundi Govinda Mudaliyar Natesa Mudaliyar, Constable, Madras City Police.
- Rowther Jagganadha Rao Nayudu, Inspector of Police, Madras.
- Panappakkam Ella Pillai Muruga Pillai, Constable, Madras City Police.
- Ignasamuthu, Head Constable, Ramnad District, Madras.
- Francis Everard Sharp, Assistant Superintendent of Police, Bombay.
- Patrick A. Kelly, District Superintendent of Police, Bombay.
- Sheikh Abdul Karim Abdul Aziz, Sub-Inspector of Police, Bombay.
- Khan Mahomed Dost Mahomed Brohi, Inspector of Police, Bombay.
- Edwin Lionel Cauty, Superintendent and Officiating Deputy Commissioner of Police, Bombay.
- Shaik Rasul Shaik Chand, Head Constable, Criminal Investigation Department, Bombay.
- Rasiduddin Ahammad, Head Constable, Bengal Police.
- Harendra Nath Chakrabatti, Head Constable, Bengal Police.
- Mohendra Nath Mukherji, Inspector, Calcutta Police.
- Didar Husain, Sub-Inspector of Police, Bengal.
- George Woods Dixon, Superintendent of Police, Officiating Deputy Inspector-General, Intelligence Branch, Criminal Investigation Department, Bengal.
- Bharat Chandra Mukharji, Head Constable, Bengal Police.
- Derajuddin, Constable, Bengal Police.
- Subodh Chandra Chakrabartti, Inspector of Police, Bengal.
- Shaj Mahamad, Head Constable, Bengal Police.
- Thakur Singh, Officiating Inspector of Police, Bengal.
- Pandit ChakraJ Dhar Jayal, Rai Bahadur, Officiating Superintendent, United Provinces Police.
- Aziz Khan, Sub-Inspector, United Provinces Police.
- Har Prasad, Sub-Inspector, United Provinces Police.
- Frederick Young, Officiating Superintendent, United Provinces Police.
- The Honourable Mr. Levett Mackenzie Kaye, Inspector-General, United Provinces Police.
- Hugh Otway de Gale, Superintendent, Punjab Police.
- Anar Khan, Officiating Inspector of Police, Mianwali District, Punjab.
- Henry George Fitzgerald, Deputy Inspector General, Punjab Police.
- Khan Bahadur Agha Ali Raza Khan, Superintendent, Punjab Police.
- Pandit Jiwan Lal, Inspector of Police, Criminal Investigation Depantment, Punjab.
- John Lacon Ommanmey, Officiating Deputy Inspector-General, Burma Police.
- Francis Herbert Fearnley-Whittingstall, District Superintendent, Burma Police.
- Gulab Khan, Constable, Rangoon Town Police.
- Khiwan Khan, Head Constable, Yamethin District, Burma.
- Pow Chin, Subadar, Burma Military Police.
- Lieutenant Reginald George Bateman Lawson, Indian Army Reserve of Officers, District Superintendent, Assistant Commandant, Burma Military Police.
- Robert Joseph Ashby, Inspector and Officiating Deputy Superintendent, Bihar and Orissa Police.
- Natharam, Inspector, Criminal Investigation Department, Central Provinces Police.
- Ramlal, Inspector, Criminal Investigation Department, Central Province Police.
- Alexander Tollemache Halliday, Special Superintendent in charge of the Criminal Investigation Department, Assam Police.
- Bhuban Mohan Ganguli, Deputy Superintendent of Police, Assam.
- Hangspal Limbu Jemadar, 3rd (Naga Hills) Battalion, Assam Rifles.
- James Edward Ryall, Assistant Superintendent, North-West Frontier Province Police.
- Girdhari Lal, Sub-Inspector, North-West Frontier Province Police.
- George Durrant Sanderson, Officiating District Officer, Frontier Constabulary.
- Jiwan Das, Sub-Inspector, North-West Frontier Province Police.
- Khan Sahib Hamid-ud-Din, Inspector of Police, Delhi.
- Evelyn Julius Bayley, Deputy Superintendent, Hyderabad Railway Police.

British Dominions Beyond The Seas

- Jonathan Atkinson, Superintendent of Police, Second Class, New South Wales.
- Michael Brooks, Superintendent of Police, Third Class, New South Wales.
- Charles Edward Stewart Rose, Sergeant of Police, South Australia.
- Michael Kenny, Divisional Inspector of Police, Orange Free State, Union of South Africa.
- Gabriel Jacobus Verster, Constable, South African Police.
- Tom Mviti, Native Constable, South African Police.
- Arthur Lane, Station Officer, Hong Kong Fire Brigade.
- William Murison, Chief Detective Inspector of Police, Hong Kong.
- James Kerr, Chief Inspector of Police, Hong Kong.
- Han Hang, Principal Chinese Detective, Hong Kong Police.
- Bernard Toole, Deputy Inspector-General of Police, Jamaica.
- Bauchi Amadu, Sergeant-Major of Police, Northern Provinces, Nigeria.
- Percy Frederick Browne, Commissioner of Police, Tanganyika Territory.

=== Promotions ===
Royal Navy

The following promotions have been made, to date from 31 December 1920.

Commander to Captain

- James G. P. Ingham, DSO.
- Colin A. M. Sarel, OBE.
- Wilbraham T. R. Ford.
- Claud F. Allsup, DSO.
- James S. C. Salmond.
- Eric G. Robinson, VC, OBE.
- Hugh Seymour, DSO.
- Edward O. Cochrane.
- Everard J. Hardman-Janes, OBE.
- James D. Campbell, MVO, OBE.
- Hugh D. Hamilton.
- Charles S. Benning, DSO.
- Edward O. B. S. Osborne, DSO.

Lieutenant-Commander to Commander

- Henry V. Hudson, OBE.
- Andrew Wilmot-Smith, DSO.
- Andrew Johnstone, DSO.
- George Wilson.
- Edwin G. Morris.
- William R. Priston.
- Roger Burges.
- William H. W. Ridley.
- Melvill Hensman, DSO.
- Geoffrey R. S. Watkins, DSO.
- John G. P. Vivian.
- Francis R. Barry.
- Arthur E. H. Wright, DSO.
- Frederick G. Charsley, DSO.
- Henry M. Coombs, DSO.
- Edye K. Boddam-Whetham, DSO.
- Malby D. Brownlow.
- John G. Crace.
- Geoffrey Nicholson.
- Eric W. W. Ling.
- Ralph D. Binney.
- Herbert Pott.
- Colin Cantlie, DSC.
- Francis Q. Champness.

Lieutenant to Commander

- HRH Albert Frederick Arthur George, Duke of York, KG.

Paymaster Commander to be Paymaster Captain

To date from 1 January 1921.

- John E. Jones.
- Charles M. Luckham.
- Beauchamp U. Colclough, CBE.
- William E. R. Martin, CMG.
- Bertram C. Allen, CB, MVO.
- Hugh S. Hall, CBE.
- Charles J. E. Rotter, CB.
- Walter Gask, CB.

Engineer Commander to Engineer Captain

- Charles A. Harding.
- Frederick W. Sydenham, OBE.
- Hugh S. Garwood, OBE.
- Walter W. Bills.
- George N Leslie.
- Walter S. Hill.

Engineer Lieutenant-Commander to Engineer Commander

- Percy Reeve.
- Robert Montgomery.
- William F. Paffett.
- Charles S. Bell.
- Thomas H. Warde.
- Cecil B. Sheppard.
- Osborne W. Skinner.
- Howard Wormell.
- James Ashton, DSO.
- Laurence P. Fowler.
- Harold V. Gaud.
- Norman S. Richardson.
- Albert A. G. Martell, DSO.
- Réné C. Hugill, OBE, MVO.

Surgeon-Commander to Surgeon-Captain

- Christopher L. W. Bunton, MB.

Royal Naval Reserve

Commander to Captain

- James Turnbull, CBE, RD.
- Frederick G. Brown, RD.
- Frederick H. Fitzroy, RD.

Lieutenant-Commander to Commander

- Alfred S. Leech, RD.
- Harry C. Birnie, DSO, RD.
- William P. Townshend, RD.
- Charles G. Matheson, DSO, RD.
- Edward A. Singeisen, DSC, RD.
- Edward S. Carver, RD.
- John W. Williams, DSO, RD.
- Charlies M. Wray.
- Robert B. Irving, OBE, RD.

Army

Honorary ranks, in recognition of distinguished services rendered during the War.

Honorary Lieutenant-General

- Honorary Major-General His Highness Saramand-i-Rajha-i-Hindustan Raj Rajindar Sri Maiharajadhiraja Sir Sawai Madho Singh Bahadur, GCSI, GCIE, GCVO, GBE, , Maharaja of Jaipur.

Honorary Colonel

- Honorary Lieutenant-Colonel His Highness Sawai Maharaja Sir Jey Singh Bahadur, GCIE, KCSI, Maharaja of Alwar.

Honorary Major

- Honorary Lieutenant His Highness Maharaja Sri Brajindra Sawai Kishan Singh Bahadur Jang, Maharaja of Bharatpur.
- His Highness Rais-ud Daula Sipahdar-ul Mulk Maharajadhiraja Sri Sawai Maharaji Rana Sir Udaibhan Singh Lokindar Bahadur Diler Jang Jai Deo, KCSI, Maharaj-Rana of Diholpur.
- Honorary Captain His Highness Nawab Sidi Ibrahim Mohamed Yakub Khan Mubazarat Nasrat Jung Bahadur, Nawab of Sachin.
- Honorary Captain His Highness Raja Sir Bije Chand, KCIE, CSI, Raja of Bilaspur.

Honorary Captain

- Maharaj Kumar Sadul Singh, son of His Highness the Maharaja of Bikaner.
- Rao Raja Hanut Singh, son of His Highness Maharaja Sir Partap Singh Bahadur, Regent of Jodhpur.
- Rao Raja Sagat Singh, son of His Highness Maharaja Sir Partap Singh Bahadur, Regent of Jodhpur.
- Nawab Aizud-din Ahmed Khan, Nawab of Loharu.

=== Royal Red Cross (RRC) ===
Bar to the Royal Red Cross

- Dorothea Matilda Taylor, RRC, (Acting) Principal Matron, Queen Alexandra’s Imperial Military Nursing Service.

2nd Class

- Lizzie Parrish Dixon, Matron, Military Families' Hospital Staff.

=== Air Force Cross (AFC) ===
Bar to the Air Force Cross

- Flying Officer Thomas Audley Langford-Sainsbury, AFC. (Air Force Cross gazetted 1 January 1919).
