= 1914 New Year Honours =

Appointments by King George V to various orders and honours

The New Year Honours 1914 were appointments by King George V to various orders and honours to reward and highlight good works by members of the British Empire. They were announced on 2 January 1914.

== Order of the Bath ==
=== Knight Grand Cross (GCB) ===
Military Division

- Lieutenant-General Sir Herbert Scott Gould Miles, K.C.B., C.V.O., Colonel, Royal Munster Fusiliers, Governor and Commander-in-Chief, Gibraltar.

=== Knight Commander (KCB) ===
Military Division

- Vice-Admiral Thomas Henry Martyn Jerram, C.B.
- Rear-Admiral (Acting Vice-Admiral) Lewis Bayly, C.V.O., C.B.
- Admiral Randolph Frank Ollive Foote, C.M.G.
- Vice-Admiral Arthur Murray Farquhar, C.V.O.
- Vice-Admiral Paul Warner Bush, M.V.O.
- Major-General Barrington Bulkley Douglas Campbell-Douglas, C.V.O., C.B., Retired Pay.
- Major-General Thomas Perrott, C.B., Retired Pay.
- Major-General William Drummond Scrase Dickins, C.B., Retired Pay.
- Major-General Herbert Mansfield, C.B., Retired Pay.
- Lieutenant-General Sir James Willcocks, K.C.S.I., K.C.M.G, C.B., D.S.O., General Officer Commanding, Northern Army, India

Civil Division

- Reginald Herbert Brade, Esq., C.B., Assistant Secretary, War Office.
- James Patten MacDougall, Esq., C.B., Registrar-General, Scotland.
- George Augustus Stevenson, Esq., C.V.O., C.B., chairman, Board of Public Works, Ireland.
- Charles Archer Cook, Esq., C.B., Chief Charity Commissioner.
- George Francis Hardy, Esq., F.I.A., chairman, Actuarial Advisory Committee to the National Health Insurance Joint Committee.

=== Companion (CB) ===
Military Division

- Vice-Admiral James Startin.
- Rear-Admiral Henry Loftus Tottenham.
- Captain Hubert Grant-Dalton, R.N.
- Captain Richard Fortescue Phillimore, M.V.O., R.N.
- Brigadier-General Charles Henry Kennedy, Commandant R.M.L.I.
- Major-General Percival Spearman Wilkinson.
- Surgeon-General Harold Hathaway, deputy director of Medical Services, India.
- Colonel (temporary Brigadier-General) Wellesley Lynedoch Henry Paget, M.V.O., Commanding Royal Artillery, 6th Division, Irish Command.
- Colonel (temporary Brigadier-General) Arthur Binny Scott, D.S.O., Commanding Royal Artillery, India.
- Colonel (temporary Brigadier-General) Frederic Manley Glubb, D.S.O., Chief Engineer, Southern Command.
- Colonel (temporary Brigadier-General) Henry Sinclair Horne, Inspector of Royal Horse and Royal Field Artillery.
- Colonel (temporary Brigadier-General) Charles James Briggs, Brigade Commander, 1st Cavalry Brigade, Aldershot Command.
- Colonel Tom Evelyn O'Leary, General Staff Officer, 1st Grade, India.
- Brevet Colonel George Handcock Thesiger, C.M.G., Rifle Brigade.
- Colonel (temporary Brigadier-General) Sidney Selden Long, Director of Supplies and Quartering, War Office.
- Colonel (temporary Brigadier-General) William Arthur Watson, C.I.E., Indian Army, Commandant, Cavalry School, Saugor.
- Colonel Walter Sinclair Delamain, D.S.O., Indian Army, Assistant Adjutant-General, Army Headquarters, India.
- Colonel Vere Bonamy Fane, Indian Army, Commandant, 21st Punjabis.
- Colonel (temporary Brigadier-General) Offley Bohun Stovin Fairless Shore, D.S.O., Indian Army, Director of Staff Duties and Military Training, Army Headquarters, India.
- Colonel Harry Triscott Brooking, Indian Army, General Staff Officer, 1st Grade.
- Brevet Major Hugh Montague Trenchard, D.S.O., Royal Scots Fusiliers, Assistant Commandant, Central Flying School, Royal Flying Corps.
- Major John Duncan Bertie Fulton, Royal Artillery, Chief Inspector, Inspection Department, Royal Flying Corps.

Civil Division

- Captain Allan Frederick Everett, R.N.
- Captain Godfrey Marshall Paine, M.V.O., R.N.
- Captain Sydney Stewart Hall, R.N.
- Captain Hugh Dudley Richards Watson, M.V.O., R.N.
- Captain Murray Fraser Sueter, R.N.
- Commander Roger Roland Charles Backhouse, R.N.
- Lieutenant-Colonel Edward Castleman Castleman-Smith, Commanding 3rd Battalion, The Dorsetshire Regiment.
- Major Aston M'Neill Cooper Cooper-Key, Chief Inspector of Explosives, Home Office.
- George Cunningham, Esq., Private Secretary to the Lord President of the council.
- William Temple Franks, Esq., Comptroller-General of Patents, Designs, and Trade Marks.
- Hugh William Orange, Esq., C.I.E., Accountant-General, Board of Education.
- Frederick James Willis, Esq., Assistant Secretary, Local Government Board.

== Order of Merit ==
- Sir Archibald Geikie, K.C.B., D.Sc. LL.D., President of the Royal Society.

== Order of the Star of India ==
=== Knight Commander (KCSI) ===
- Syed Ali Imam, Esq., C.S.I., an Ordinary Member of the Council of the Governor-General of India.
- Duncan Colvin Baillie, Esq., C.S.I., Member of the Board of Revenue, United Provinces of Agra and Oudh.

=== Companion (CSI) ===
- Behari Lal Gupta, Esq., Indian Civil Service (retired), Minister of the Baroda State.
- Henry Wheeler, Esq., C.I.E., Indian Civil Service, Secretary to the Government of India in the Home Department, and an Additional Member of the Council of the Governor-General for making Laws and Regulations.
- Francis Welles Newmarch, Esq., Secretary, Financial Department, India Office.

== Order of Saint Michael and Saint George ==
=== Knight Grand Cross (GCMG) ===
- The Right Honourable Lord Emmott, P.C., Parliamentary Under-Secretary of State for the Colonies.
- The Right Honourable Sir Fairfax Leighton Cartwright, G.C.V.O., K.C.M.G., lately His Majesty's Ambassador Extraordinary and Plenipotentiary to His Majesty the Emperor of Austria, King of Hungary.

=== Knight Commander (KCMG) ===
- Henry Conway Belfield, Esq., C.M.G., Governor and Commander-in-Chief of the East Africa Protectorate.
- The Honourable Arthur Lyulph Stanley, on appointment as Governor of the State of Victoria.
- His Honour Sir François Charles Stanislas Langelier, Knt., LL.D., Lieutenant-Governor of the province of Quebec.
- His Honour Douglas Colin Cameron, Lieutenant-Governor of the province of Manitoba.
- Sir Stephen Henry Parker, Knt., lately the Chief Justice of Western Australia.
- The Honourable Sir Charles Christopher Bowen, Knt., Speaker of the Legislative Council of the Dominion of New Zealand.
- Major Maurice Alexander Cameron, late R.E., C.M.G., one of the Crown Agents for the Colonies.
- Arnold Theiler, Esq., C.M.G., Director of Veterinary Research, Department of Agriculture, Union of South Africa.

=== Companion (CMG) ===
- James Oliver Anthonisz, Esq., Treasurer of the Straits Settlements.
- Archibald Graeme Bell, Esq., M.Inst.C.E., Director of Public Works and Inspector of Mines of the Colony of Trinidad and Tobago.
- Charles Ernest Dale, Esq., Treasurer, Nigeria.
- Charles Barnard Evans, Esq., Commissioner for Railways of the State of Queensland.
- William Henry Jackson, Esq., lately Controller of Revenue of the Island of Ceylon.
- Charles Jerome Jones, Esq., I.S.O., Assistant Secretary to the Governor-General of the Dominion of Canada.
- Frederick Arthur Knowles, Esq., Provincial Commissioner, Uganda Protectorate.
- Hugh Campbell McDonald, Esq., Resident, First Grade, Nyasaland Protectorate.
- Ernest Lewis Matthews, Esq., K.C., Law Adviser, Department of Justice, Union of South Africa.
- John Hubert Plunkett Murray, Esq., Lieutenant-Governor and Chief Judicial Officer, Territory of Papua.
- John Shand, Esq., M.A., LL.D., Professor of Natural Philosophy, University of Otago, Dominion of New Zealand.
- Aubrey White, Esq., Deputy Minister of Lands and Forests, province of Ontario.
- Major-General Percival Spearman Wilkinson, lately Inspector-General of the West African Frontier Force.
- Ulick Fitzgerald Wintour, Esq., Director of the Exhibitions Branch of the Board of Trade.
- Berthold George Tours, Esq., His Majesty's Consul at Ichang, China; for services during the recent disturbances at Nanking.
- Lieutenant-Colonel Arthur Lance Tisdall, R.A.
- Lieutenant-Colonel Michael Edward Willoughby, Indian Army, late Military Attache to His Majesty's Legation at Peking.

== Order of the Indian Empire ==
=== Companion (CIE) ===
- Hugh Edward Clerk, Esq., India Public Works Department, Joint Secretary to the Government of Madras, Public Works Department, Irrigation Branch, and an Additional Member of the Council of the Governor of Fort St. George for making Laws and Regulations.
- Percy James Mead, Esq., Indian Civil Service, Collector and District Magistrate, Ahmednagar, Bombay Presidency.
- Deba Prosad Sarbadhikari, LL.D., M.A., an Additional Member of the Council of the Governor of Bengal for making Laws and Regulations.
- Frank Charles Daly, Esq., Indian Police, Officiating Deputy Inspector-General of Police, Crime, and Railways, Bengal.
- Khan Bahadur Mir Shams Shah, I.S.O., Baluchistan Provincial Service, Political Adviser to His Highness the Khan of Kalat.
- Haji Bukhsh Ellahie, of Delhi.
- Frank Edwin Gwyther, Esq., India Public Works Department, Chief Engineer and Secretary, Irrigation Branch, Public Works Department, Punjab.
- James Gargrave Covernton, Esq., M.A., Indian Educational Service, Director of Public Instruction, Burma,
- Louis Eveleigh Bawtree Cobden-Ramsay, Esq., Indian Civil Service, Political Agent, Orissa Feudatory States, Bihar and Orissa.
- William Pell Barton, Esq., Indian Civil Service, Officiating Judicial Commissioner, North-West Frontier Province.
- George Batley Scott, Esq., Survey of India Department (retired).
- Rao Bahadur Rangnath Narsingh Mudholkar, of Amravati, Advocate of the High Court, Central Provinces and Berar.
- Major Charles Bliss, Indian Army, Commandant, Naga Hills Military Police Battalion, Assam.
- Hebbalalu Velpanur Nanjundayya, Esq., M.A., Councillor, Mysore State.
- Major James Currie Robertson, M.B., Indian Medical Service, Sanitary Commissioner with the Government of India, and an Additional Member of the Council of the Governor-General for making Laws and Regulations.
- William Sinclair Marris, Esq., Indian Civil Service, Magistrate and Collector of Aligarh, United Provinces of Agra and Oudh.
- George Frederick Buckley, Esq., Deputy Commissioner, Northern India Salt Revenue Department.
- Major John Dalrymple Edgar Holmes, D.Sc., M.A., M.R.C.V.S., Indian Civil Veterinary Department, Imperial Bacteriologist in charge of the Veterinary Laboratory at Muktesar.
- Rao Bahadur Raghunath Venkaji Sabnis, Dewan, Kolhapur State.

== Royal Victorian Order ==
=== Knight Commander (KCVO) ===
- Sir Rickman John Godlee, Bart., F.R.C.S., M.S.
- Colonel Sir Henry Hugh Oldham, C.V.O.
- Sir William Job Collins, F.R.C.S., M.D.
- Sir Aston Webb, C.V.O., C.B., R.A.

=== Commander (CVO) ===
- Sir James Humphreys Harrison, M.V.O.

=== Member, 4th Class ===
- Colonel Charles Clitherow Gore.
- Frederick Shingleton, Esq.

=== Member, 5th Class ===
- Henry Holmes, Esq.
- William Southgate Sands, Esq.

== King's Police Medal ==
England and Wales

- Major Sir Edwin Frederick Wodehouse, K.C.V .O., C.B., Assistant Commissioner of the Metropolitan Police.
- Captain William Hugh Tomasson, M.V.O., Chief Constable of Nottinghamshire.
- Major Robert Lister Bower, C.M.G., Chief Constable of the North Riding of Yorkshire.
- Joseph Farndale, Chief Constable of the Bradford City Police Force.
- James Trotter, Head Constable of Gateshead.
- Thomas Fowle, Superintendent, Kent Constabulary.
- Alexander Baird Robertson, Superintendent and Deputy Chief Constable, East Riding of Yorkshire Constabulary.
- William C. Robinson, Superintendent, Metropolitan Police.
- Francis Wookey, Superintendent, Bristol City Police.
- James Wasley, Superintendent and Deputy Chief Constable, Worcestershire Constabulary.
- Edgar Lee, Detective-Inspector, Stockport Borough Police.
- Samuel Cox, Inspector, Newport (Mon.) Borough Police.
- William Tanner, Detective-Inspector, Newport (Mon.) Borough Police.
- William Nixon, Detective-Inspector, Wolverhampton Borough Police.
- Levi Jeffries, Sergeant, Wolverhampton Borough Police.
- Andrew Barton, Sergeant, Northumberland Constabulary.
- George Bertram Mussell, Constable, Northumberland Constabulary.
- Thomas Rothery, Sergeant, Lancashire Constabulary.
- Arthur Stiff, Acting-Sergeant, Metropolitan Police.
- Albert English, George Jameson, William Lockwood, George Porter, Noah Jones and Cornelius Goodwin, Constables, Metropolitan Police.
- Harry White Turner, Constable, Cornwall Constabulary.
- Harold Weller, Constable, Surrey Constabulary.

Fire Brigades

- Alfred G. Peck and Alfred D. Gordon, Sub-Officers: A. E. Barber and W. F. Newberry, Firemen, London Fire Brigade.
- William 0. Etherden, late Senior Superintendent, London Fire Brigade.

Scotland

- Captain Herbert J. Desparcl, Chief Constable. Lanarkshire Constabulary.
- John Ord, Superintendent, Glasgow City Police.
- Lieutenant John Trench, Detective, Glasgow City Police.
- William C. George, Constable, Kincardineshire Constabulary.

As Constable George is already in possession of the Police Medal, this award will take the form of a bar attached to the riband by which the medal is suspended.

Fire Brigades

- Arthur McNaughtan, Superintendent. Paisley Fire Brigade.

Ireland

- William Arthur O'Connell, Deputy Inspector-General, Royal Irish Constabulary.
- John Golden, Sergeant, Royal Irish Constabulary.
- John Lowe, Superintendent, Dublin Metropolitan Police.

India

- Khan Sahib Muhammad Abdul Karim Sahib Farukhi, Deputy Superintendent, Criminal Investigation Department, Madras Police.
- Joseph McLaughlin, Deputy Superintendent and Acting Superintendent, Madras Police (Retired).
- M. E. Ey. N. S. Manikkam Pillai, Inspector, Madras Police.
- Sankara Navar, Constable, Madras Police. Govindaswami, Head Constable, Madras Police.
- Shaikh Miya Sahib, Head Constable, Madras Police.
- Charles Arthur Berkeley Beatty, Deputy Inspector-General, Bombay Police.
- Shaikh Hassan Shaikh Bagan, Head Constable, Bombay Police.
- Robert MacTier, Acting Commissioner, Bombay Police.
- John Arnold Wallinger, Superintendent, Bombay Police.
- Ratanji Rustomjee Mirza, Inspector, Bombay Police.
- Rao Saheb Keshav Vithal Kokje, Inspector, Bombay Police.
- Dwarka Parsad Manbodh, Inspector, Bombay Police.
- Gopalsing Achalsingh, Inspector, Bombay Police (Retired).
- Ralph Buller Hughes-Buller, C.I.E., I.C.S., Officiating Director, Criminal Intelligence.
- Goanbir Rai, Constable, Bengal Police.
- Captain Edmund Denman Dallas-Smith, I.A., Assistant Commandant, Bengal Military Police.
- Mohin Chandra, Lance-Naik, Bengal Military Police.
- Dhanja Ram, Sepoy, Bengal Military Police.
- Dhaga Ram, Havildar, Bengal Military Police.
- Chiranji Lai, Inspector, Criminal Investigation Department, United Provinces Police.
- Muhammad Kabir-ud-din, Sub-Inspector, United Provinces Police.
- Frederick Young, Assistant Superintendent, United Provinces Police.
- Jan Muhammad, Havildar, Burma Military Police (retired).
- David Petrie, M.A., Punjab Police.
- M. G. Wall, Superintendent, Punjab Police.
- Rani Labaya, Sub-Inspector, Punjab Police.
- Muhammad Ismail Khan, Sub-Inspector, Punjab Police.
- Maung K. Thwe, T.D.M., Inspector, Burma Police.
- Maung Kyaing, Constable, Burma Police.
- Mang Baw Di, Inspector, Burma Police.
- Captain Hubert Crooks Gilchrist, Assistant Commandant, Burma Military Police.
- Captain Bryan Xorman Abbay, Assistant Commandant, Burma Military Police.
- Captain Chauncy Batho Dashwood Strettell, Assistant Commandant, Burma Military Police.
- Captain Xorman Meredith Geoghegan, Assistant Commandant, Burma Military Police.
- Harkuraj Limbu, Subadar, Burma Military Police.
- Partiman Gurung, Havildar, Burma Military Police.
- Kam Brik Singh, Deputy Superintendent, Bihar and Orissa Police.
- Sheo Pershad Hegmi, Officiating Deputy Superintendent, Bihar and Orissa Police.
- Sbeoji Tewari, Constable, Bihar and Orissa Police.
- Babu Ram Singh, Constable, Bihar and Orissa Police.
- B. W. Drury, Assistant Superintendent, Central Provinces Police.
- Sadasheo Narain, Sub-Inspector, Central Provinces Police.
- Mohamed Yakub, Constable, Central Provinces Police.
- Sheodularay, Constable, Central Provinces Police.
- Major Charles Bliss, I.A., Commandant, Assam Military Police.
- Khan Sahib Abdul Nur, Inspector, Assam Police.
- Gokul Nath Dam, Inspector, Assam Police.
- Mian Abdul Hamid, Inspector, North-West Frontier Province Police.
- Net Singh, Constable, Central India Police.

Colonial Forces

- Thomas Head, Senior Sergeant, Queensland Police.
- John Joseph Scanlan and Peter Lynch, Sergeants, Queensland Police.
- James Geraghty, Senior Inspector, Queensland Police.
- John William McKenzie, Constable, South African Police.
- Major Algernon Essex Capell, D.S.O., Chief Inspector, British South Africa Police.
- Domenico Depares, Constable, Malta Police.
- Bawa Allah. Sergeant Major, Northern Nigeria Police.
- Cecil de Sivrac Dunn, Somaliland Camel Constabulary.
