= George Francis Hardy =

British actuary and amateur astronomer

- Born: 14 December 1855; Islington, London, England
- Died: 5 October 1914 (aged 58); Kensington, London, England
- Occupations: Actuary, Egyptologist, and amateur astronomer
- Known for: Fellow of the Royal Astronomical Society

Sir George Francis Hardy KCB FRAS (14 December 1855 – 5 October 1914) was a British actuary, Egyptologist and amateur astronomer. He became a Fellow of the Royal Astronomical Society in 1877 and was President of the Institute of Actuaries from 1908 to 1910.

== Career ==
Aged 15, Hardy joined the British Mutual Empire Life Office and later qualified for the Institute of Actuaries, after passing his first exam in 1874 and becoming a Fellow in 1880. In that year he published (with George King) "Notes on the practical application of Mr Makeham's Formula to the Graduation of Mortality Tables" in which both practical methods and the theory of actuarial science were extended. This theory is now called the Gompertz–Makeham law of mortality.

Following years as a tutor and in private practice, Hardy was elected President of the Institute of Actuaries in 1908. He advised Governments, and was instrumental in the work that lead to the National Insurance Act 1911. A bronze bust of Hardy was sculpted by Gilbert Bayes for the institute. Hardy was a Chairman of the Actuarial Advisory Committee to the National Health Insurance Joint Committee, a role for which he was awarded the Order of the Bath in the 1914 New Year Honours.

He was made a Fellow of the Royal Astronomical Society on 9 February 1877. His interest in astronomy had started early, with a copy of Herschel's Outlines of Astronomy that was dated in his own hand when he was a teenager. In 1874, he suggested a new method of determining the Sun's distance from the Earth using solar parallax, which was published in The English Mechanic and World of Science.

Hardy's interest in Egyptology led to suggesting a method for determining the age the Great Pyramid of Giza. Based on astronomical evidence, he suggested that the Fourth Dynasty of Egypt would have started around 3,700 BC (now shown to be incorrect). This was between two other estimates: 2,700 to 2,840 (by various authorities) and 4,731 BC (by Flinders Petrie). Today the start of the Fourth Dynasty is dated to 2613 BC.

== Personal life ==
Hardy was born in Islington and died at Edwardes Square, Kensington, London, where he had lived. He was educated at a school at which his father was the head teacher.

He married Jane Ann Lester in 1883, who was a half sister of Muriel Lester.

== Publications ==
- Memorandum on the age tables and rates of mortality of the Indian census of 1901
- The Theory of the Construction of Tables of Mortality : A Course of Lectures (1909)
- Hardy, George F. and Frank B. Wyatt. "Report of the actuaries in relation to the scheme of insurance against sickness, disablement, etc., embodied in the national insurance bill, 1911" in Institute of Actuaries Journal, July, 1911
