= Behari Lal Gupta =

Indian politician

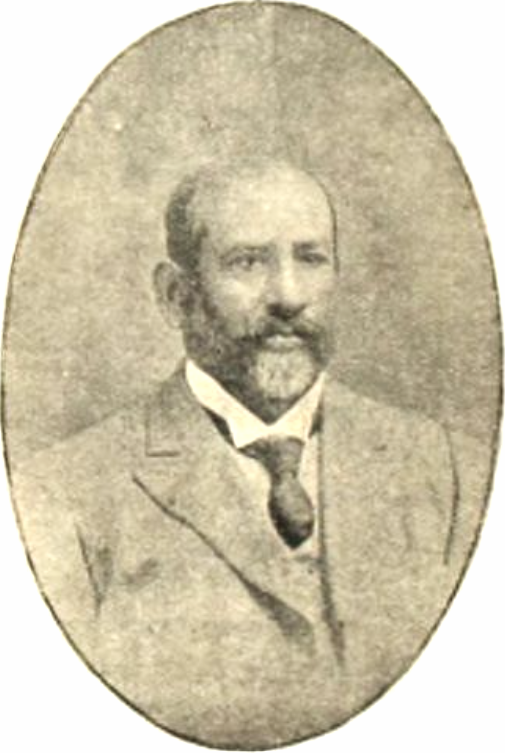
- Behari Lal Gupta
- Born: 1849; Calcutta
- Died: 1916 (aged 66–67); Calcutta
- Occupations: Civil servant, politician

Behari Lal Gupta CSI was a member of the Indian Civil Service and a politician.

== Early life and education ==
Gupta was born in Calcutta into a Vaidya family. His parents were Chandrasekhar Gupta and Rajeshwari, who was the elder sister of Narendranath Sen, editor of the Indian Mirror, the weekly journal of the Brahmo Samaj.

His early education was at Hare School and Presidency College, Calcutta. He then proceeded with his childhood friends R.C. Dutt and Surendranath Banerjee to England for higher studies. In England he joined University College, London and eventually passed the Open Competitive Service Examinations to become the third Indian to join the Indian Civil Service in 1869 coming out to India in 1871. He belonged to the famous batch of 1869 which produced four Indians in the Indian Civil Service, including R.C. Dutt, himself, Surendranath Banerjee and Sripad Babaji Thakur. He held Degrees of Honour in Sanskrit and Persian. He was also called to the Bar by the Honourable Society of Middle Temple on 6 June 1871.

He was a member of the Brahmo Sammilan Samaj in Bhowanipore, Calcutta.

== Career ==
His career in the civil service was distinguished: he became the first Indian Chief Presidency Magistrate and Coroner of Calcutta in 1872, an appointment that sparked off a serious debate on the legitimacy of an Indian civilian being appointed to such a senior position in the British Indian administration, leading to the Ilbert Bill controversy of 1883.

He was also a District and Sessions Judge, Remembrancer and Superintendent of Legal Affairs, Bengal, Member, Bengal Legislative Council, and finally a Judge (offtg.) of the High Court of Calcutta from where he retired in 1907.

== Post-retirement ==
After retirement he was appointed as Law and Justice Member in Baroda in 1909 and then Dewan in 1912. In 1914 he travelled with His Highness, Maharaja Sayajirao Gaekwad III, Maharaja of Baroda to Europe. He was appointed CSI in the 1914 New Year Honours.

== Awards ==
- Durbar Medals (1903), (1912)
