= Frederick Eley =

Frederick Eley may refer to:

- Sir Frederick Eley, 1st Baronet (1866–1951), English banker
- Frederick Eley (architect) (1884–1979), American architect
