= Dashwood Strettell =

Major-General in British Indian Army

Sir Chauncy Batho Dashwood Strettell KCIE, CB
- Born: 6 August 1881
- Died: 27 January 1958 (aged 76)
- Spouses: Kathleen Batho Castle; Margery Gillian de Hane
- Military career
- Allegiance: United Kingdom
- Branch: British Indian Army
- Service years: 1900–1944
- Rank: Major General
- Unit: Indian Staff Corps
- Conflicts: Waziristan Campaign of 1901–1902; Nmai-Hka Expedition; First World War; Mesopotamian campaign; Second World War
- Awards: Knight Commander of the Order of the Indian Empire (1940); Companion of the Order of the Bath (1935); King's Police Medal (1914)

Major-General Sir Chauncy Batho Dashwood Strettell, KCIE, CB (6 August 1881 – 27 January 1958), known by his middle name "Dashwood", was a senior officer in the British Indian Army. A graduate of Wellington College and the Royal Military College, Sandhurst, he was commissioned as a second lieutenant in 1900. He served in Burma and India, and participated in the Mesopotamian campaign in the First World War.

Promoted to major general in 1934, he was deputy quarter master general and director of movements in India from July 1935 to February 1936 and then director of the organisation in India until November 1936, when he became commander of the Peshawar District. He retired in 1940, but was recalled active service as a group commandant of the prisoner of war camps in 1941. He was director of demobilisation and reconstruction in Indian from 1941 to 1943, before retiring for the last time in 1944.

== Early life and family ==
Chauncy Batho Dashwood Strettell, known by his middle name "Dashwood", was born on 6 August 1881, the eldest son of Lieutenant-Colonel Arnold Dashwood Strettell (1845–1933), of Hythe in Kent, and his wife Harriette Elizabeth née Batho (died 1884), daughter of William Fothergill Batho (1828–1886), a civil engineer, of Surbiton in Surrey. (Note: Burke's Landed Gentry and Who Was Who do not name him. A wedding notice for Arnold Dashwood Strettell and Hariette Elizabeth Batho calls her father "W. F. Batho, CE". His full name is given in an obituary in the Proceedings of the Institution of Mechanical Engineers and reports of his will mention his daughter "Mrs Strettell".) He had a younger brother, Arnold William Cunninghame (1884–1888), and two half-siblings by his father's second marriage to Hortense Augusta (died 1951), daughter of Francis Levien, secretary to the London Stock Exchange: Doris Eileen (born 1892) and Colonel Eric Francis Dashwood, OBE (1894–1970). His father entered the Indian Army in 1862, serving successively with the Connaught Rangers and the 190th Regiment. He fought in the Abyssinian Campaign, before working for a year in the Bengal staff Corps. He was in the Kurram Column 1878–79, the Waziri Expedition of 1881 and the Takht Sulliman Expedition of 1891.

Strettell married Kathleen Batho Castle in the St Martin in the Fields Parish Church on 12 September 1914. They had one child, Arnold Dashwood. In 1922, Strettell married Margery Gillian de Hane (died 1978), daughter of Herbert Henry Brown, OBE, , FRCS; they had a son, James Dashwood (born 1924), who served as a captain in the Royal Artillery.

== Career ==
Following schooling at Wellington College and the Royal Military College, Sandhurst, Strettell was commissioned as a second lieutenant on the unattached list on 20 January 1900 "with a view to [his] appointment on the Indian Staff Corps". Posted to the Bengal Command three months later, he was formally transferred to the Indian Staff Corps in april 1901, before promotion to lieutenant the following May. He served with the 13th Rajputs in 1901 and the 3rd Punjab Cavalry in 1902 during the Waziristan Campaign of 1901–1902. Promotion to the rank of captain on 20 January 1909 was followed by service in the Burma Military Police, during which time he took part in the Nmai-Hka Expedition between 1912 and 1913. He was awarded the King's Police Medal for this service in the 1914 New Year Honours.

Strettell fought in World War I. He was based in England when the war began and so raised the service squadron of the 6th Dragoons, which he commanded as a temporary major between October 1914 and June 1915 and was made a full major on the first day of September 1915. The following February, he was posted to Mesopotamia; he served as a brigade major in the 7th Indian Cavalry Brigade between December 1917 and April 1919, a deputy assistant quarter master general in India between June and November 1919, and a general staff officer in India between December 1919 and September 1920. Strettell was then appointed brigade major in the Egyptian Expeditionary Force, but relinquished his post in December 1921. Having been a brevet lieutenant-colonel since 3 June 1919, he was appointed to the full rank on 25 April 1924 and a colonel on 1 November of that year (with seniority to the previous June).

Having been commandant of the 11th Cavalry (Frontier Force) between 1924 and 1928, Strettell served as an assistant adjutant general in India between July 1928 and July 1929, a brigade commander from then until April 1932 and a brigadier general on the Indian Staff until December 1934. On 26 August 1934, he was promoted to major-general, and appointed deputy quarter master general and director of movements in India between July 1935 and February 1936. He was director of the organisation in India from then until November 1936, when he became commander of the Peshawar District. He retired in 1940, although he was brought back into active service as a group commandant of the prisoner of war camps in 1941. He was then director of demobilisation and reconstruction in Indian (1941–1943), before retiring for the last time in 1944.

Strettell was appointed a Companion of the Order of the Bath in 1935 and Knight Commander of the Order of the Indian Empire in 1940. In his retirement, Strettell served on a number of boards, including the Council of the Asian Society, the Governing body of Wellington College (1947–56) and the Punjab Frontier Force Executive Committee (Chairman between 1951 and 1954). He died on 27 January 1958.
