= James Anthonisz =

British colonial service officer (1860-1921)

James Oliver Anthonisz CMG
- Born: 16 January 1860; Galle, Ceylon
- Died: 28 May 1921 (aged 61); Richmond
- Education: St John's College, Cambridge
- Occupation: Colonial administrator
- Years active: 1883-1914
- Children: 3 daughters

James Oliver Anthonisz CMG (16 January 1860 – 28 May 1921) was a British colonial administrator who served for thirty years in British Malaya.

== Early life and education ==
Anthonisz was born in Galle, Ceylon (now Sri Lanka) on 16 January 1860, the second son of James Edmund, Secretary of Galle Council and Eliza Anthonisz. He was educated at Colombo Academy, and later entered St John's College, Cambridge where he received his BA Mathematical Tripos.

== Career ==
In 1882, he joined the Civil Service of the Straits Settlements as a cadet. Posted to Singapore, he was in turn Assistant Immigration Agent; Third Magistrate and Second Magistrate; Acting Official Assignee and Registrar of Deeds; Acting First Magistrate; Official Assignee and Registrar of Deeds; Principal Municipal Commissioner; Commissioner of the Court of Requests, First Magistrate, and President of the Municipal Commission (1901–1903).

Later, he was appointed Treasurer of the Straits Settlements (1908–1913), and soon after taking office was faced with the difficult task of fixing the exchange rate of the Straits dollar which was subsequently placed on a formal gold standard during his tenure of office. For this work, and his subsequent service as Treasurer, he was awarded the CMG. He also served on the Executive and Legislative Councils. From 1910–11, he was President of the Commission to inquire into municipal affairs.

Later, he served as Acting Resident Councillor, Penang (April 1910–January 1911), Acting British Resident Selangor (January 1911–August 1911). He then returned to Singapore where he served as Accountant General of the Supreme Court. He retired from the Straits Settlements in 1913, but subsequently served during the First World War in the Colonial Office.

== Personal life and death ==
Anthonisz married Florence Lowndes in 1894 and they had three daughters.

Anthonisz died on 28 May 1921 in Richmond as a result of injuries suffered in a car accident while travelling home from his job at the Colonial Office.

== Honours ==
Anthonisz was appointed Companion of the Order of St Michael and St George (CMG) in the 1914 New Years Honours.
