= William Henry Jackson (colonial administrator) =

British colonial administrator c.1860–1920)

The Honourable William Henry Jackson CMG

Controller of Revenue, British Ceylon
- In office 1911–1913

Personal details
- Born: c. 1860
- Died: 14 December 1920 Nelson, New Zealand
- Children: 2 sons and 5 daughters
- Occupation: Colonial civil servant

William Henry Jackson CMG (c. 1860 – 14 December 1920) was a British colonial administrator who served as Controller of Revenue in British Ceylon.

== Early life and education ==
Jackson was the third son of Lt-Col Thomas Jackson of Harbledown, Kent. He was educated at King's School, Canterbury and Royal Indian Engineering College, Surrey.

== Career ==
Jackson entered the Ceylon Civil Service in 1879 and served in various administrative and legal posts. In 1892, he was appointed police magistrate in Colombo, and in 1895 served as assistant Government Agent.

In 1901, Jackson was appointed Principal Collector of Customs. On 15 June, his discovery of $257,000, the proceeds of a Hong Kong bank robbery, on a ship in Colombo harbour received much publicity. The same year he was appointed Chairman of Colombo Harbour Board and became a member of the Legislative Council. In 1911, he served as Controller of Revenue and became a member of the Executive Council before retiring in 1913.

== Personal life and death ==
Jackson married and had two sons and five daughters.

Jackson died in Nelson, New Zealand on 14 December 1920.

== Honours ==
Jackson was appointed Companion of the Order of St Michael and St George (CMG) in the 1914 New Year Honours.
