= John Charles Fox =

Sir John Charles Fox (1855 – 1943), eldest son of John Fox, solicitor, was born on 29 May 1855. In 1880, he married Mary Louisa, second daughter of John Sutherland Valentine, C. E. Fox had three sons and three daughters. He liked to play golf. He was educated at Kensington Grammar School. He was admitted a solicitor in 1876 and was a member of the firm Hare and Co., agents for the Treasury Solicitor, from 1881 to 1891. He became a Chief Clerk in the Chancery Division in 1891, the title of this office being changed to Master in 1897. He became Senior Master in 1917 and retired in 1921. He was knighted in the New Year Honours of 1921.

He was one of the editors of the Yearly Supreme Court Practice. He is the author of Handbook of English Law Reports (1913). It is a "detailed monograph". Fox was also author of The History of Contempt of Court (Clarendon Press, Oxford, 1927; reprinted by Professional Books, London, 1972).
