= Layton Blenkinsop =

British Army officer and veterinary surgeon

Major-General Sir Layton Blenkinsop KCB DSO JP FRGS
- Blenkinsop in 1921
- Born: Layton John Blenkinsop; 27 June 1862
- Died: 28 April 1942 (aged 79)
- Relatives: Major-General Sir Alfred Blenkinsop (brother)
- Military career
- Allegiance: United Kingdom
- Branch: British Army
- Service years: 1883–1921
- Rank: Major-General
- Conflicts: Mahdist War; Second Boer War; First World War
- Awards: Knight Commander of the Order of the Bath; Distinguished Service Order; Mentioned in Despatches

Director-General of Veterinary Services, British Army
- In office 1 December 1917 – 1921

Major-General Sir Layton John Blenkinsop KCB DSO JP FRGS (27 June 1862 – 28 April 1942) was a British Army officer and veterinary surgeon.

== Early life ==
Blenkinsop was the third son of Lieutenant-Colonel William Blenkinsop of the 3rd Dragoon Guards and his wife Elizabeth (née Sandford). His younger brother was Major-General Sir Alfred Blenkinsop of the Royal Army Medical Corps. He was educated at the King's School, Canterbury, and the Royal Veterinary College, where he won the Coleman Medal in 1883. Later that year he was commissioned a veterinary surgeon in the Army Veterinary Department.

== Military career ==
From 1891 to 1893, Blenkinsop served in India as advising veterinary surgeon to the government of the Punjab and as a professor at the Lahore Veterinary College. He was promoted veterinary captain on 12 September 1893. He was then stationed in Egypt from 1896 to 1899 and was senior veterinary officer of the Sudan expedition of 1898, for which he was mentioned in despatches and on 16 November 1898 awarded the Distinguished Service Order (DSO). During the Second Boer War, he was senior veterinary officer of a cavalry division from 1899 until September 1901 and then senior veterinary officer of remounts in South Africa until December 1902. He was again mentioned in despatches and promoted veterinary major. In March 1903, he was promoted veterinary lieutenant-colonel. He then held a succession of principal veterinary officer appointments: of Irish Command from 1904 to 1906, South Africa from 1906 to 1909, Northern Command in 1910, Southern Command from 1910 to 1912, and Aldershot Command from 1913 to 1916.

In July 1916, by which time he was a colonel, Blenkinsop was appointed director of veterinary services in India with the temporary rank of brigadier-general, and on 1 December 1917 he became director-general of veterinary services of the British Army, the most senior veterinary officer in the service, with the honorary rank of major-general. On 24 April 1918, he was promoted to the substantive rank of major-general. He was appointed Companion of the Order of the Bath (CB) in the 1919 Birthday Honours and Knight Commander of the Order of the Bath (KCB) in the 1921 New Year Honours. He retired later that year, but served as the first colonel-commandant of the Royal Army Veterinary Corps until 1932. He co-edited the veterinary services section of the British official history of the First World War. On 6 June 1922, he was elected to the council of the Royal College of Veterinary Surgeons for a four-year term. He was also president of the Central Veterinary Medical Society.

== Personal life ==
In 1905, Blenkinsop married Ethel Alice Wells. They had no children and lived in retirement at Melstead, Melbourn, Cambridgeshire. Blenkinsop was a justice of the peace for Cambridgeshire. He died suddenly on 28 April 1942. Following a funeral service at Melbourn Parish Church on 1 May 1942, he was cremated privately in Cambridge. On her death, Lady Blenkinsop left an endowment to establish the Sir Layton Blenkinsop Mathematical Scholarship at the King's School, Canterbury, of £100 per annum.
