= Edward Coleman (veterinary surgeon) =

English veterinary surgeon (1766-1839)

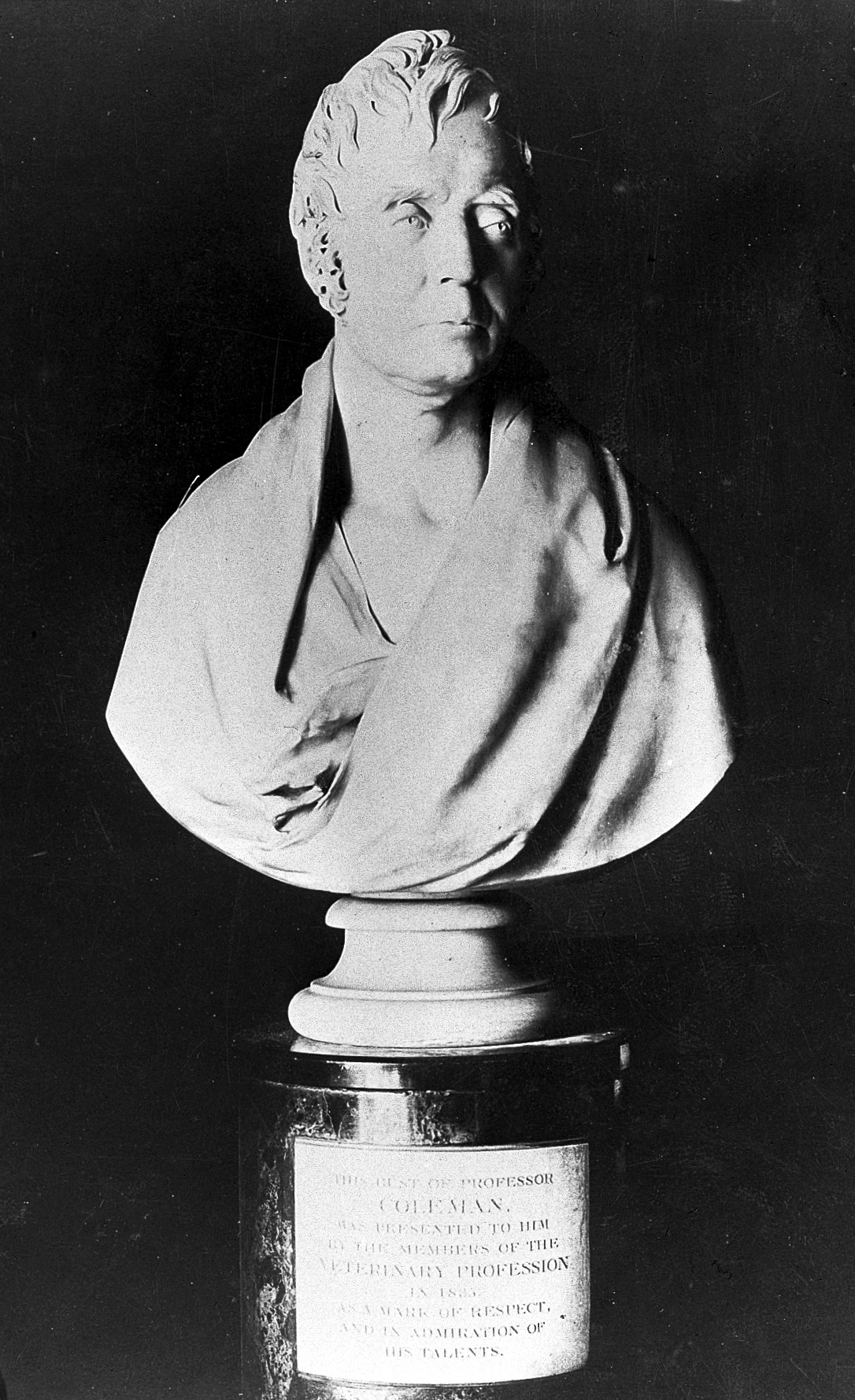
Bust of Edward Coleman

Edward Coleman (1766–1839) was an English veterinary surgeon. He trained as a surgeon, but was appointed head of the London Veterinary College in its early years.

== Biography ==
He was born in 1766 at Burmarsh, near Dymchurch, Kent, a son of Edward Coleman and Sarah West. His father was the Expenditor (Treasurer) of the Corporation of Romney Marsh. Edward Coleman (the younger) was apprenticed to Dr Kite at Gravesend and, in 1789, went to London to the Borough School of Medicine residing in the family of Henry Cline F. R. S., surgeon to Guy's Hospital.

During his training Coleman studied asphyxia and gained a prize for an essay on Resuscitation awarded by the Humane Society, published in 1791. In that year he started practising as a surgeon in London.

He interested himself in the comparative anatomy of the eye and in 1793 became professor at the London Veterinary College, although he was very ignorant of veterinary science and practise. He held the post for many years and lived in a house close to the college. In addition he visited Woolwich Hospital once a week.

In 1796 he was appointed 'Medical Superintendent to the Veterinary Service of the Board of Ordnance (Artillery) and Principal Veterinary Surgeon of the Cavalry': the founding head of the Army Veterinary Service. He relinquished the Ordnance position in 1816, but remained Principal Veterinary Surgeon of the Army until his death.

He became a Fellow of the Royal Society on 9 June 1831.

He married Sarah Slack (1771–1833), the daughter of Thomas and Jane Slack. Coleman died of gout and liver disease 14 July 1839 and was buried in the churchyard of St James's Hampstead Road.

== Works ==
- A dissertation on suspended respiration, from drowning, hanging, and suffocation: in which is recommended a different mode of treatment to any hitherto pointed out. 1791
- Observations on the Structure, OEconomy, and Diseases of the Foot of the Horse, and on the principles and practice of shoeing [With plates] 2 vol., 1798, 1802.
- Observations on the formation and uses of the natural frog of the horse with a description of a patent artificial frog, to prevent and cure contracted hoofs ..., 1800

He contributed to Rees's Cyclopædia, probably on veterinary topics.
