= John Shand =

New Zealand university professor (1834–1914)

John Shand CMG
- Born: 22 January 1834; Elgin, Moray, Scotland
- Died: 30 November 1914 (aged 80)
- Education: University of Aberdeen
- Scientific career
- Fields: Mathematician
- Workplaces: Ayr Academy, Edinburgh Academy, University of Otago

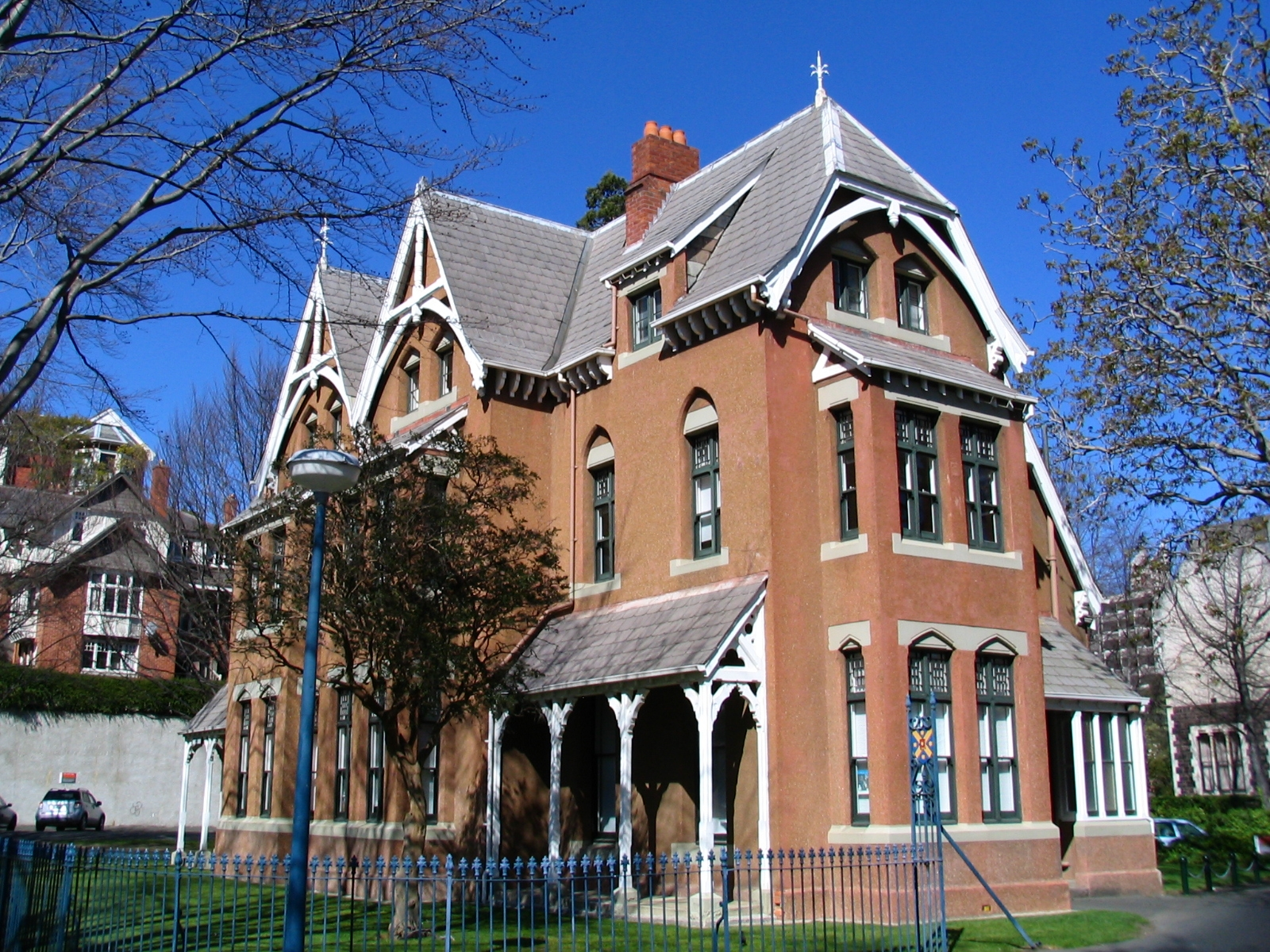
This is one of two houses which was designed for Shand and the other original professors at Otago by Maxwell Bury. The houses are today known as Scott/Shand House and Black/Sale House. Shand was quiet and retiring while his neighbour, George Sale, was more boisterous. Shand would riddle the grate of his fire at 10 pm each night to warn Sale that he was going to bed.

John Shand CMG (22 January 1834 – 30 November 1914) was a New Zealand university professor, educationalist and administrator. He was one of the three foundation professors at the University of Otago.

== Early life ==
Shand was born in Elgin, Morayshire, Scotland, in 1834. He was educated at Elgin Academy and the University of Aberdeen, from which he graduated as a Master of Arts in 1854. He held the position of mathematical master for nine years at the Ayr Academy and then a similar position at the Edinburgh Academy. On 8 February 1871, he married Annie Bell at Glasgow.

== Academic career ==
In 1870, Shand was appointed to the Chair of Mathematics and Natural Philosophy at the University of Otago, and he travelled to New Zealand on the ship Wild Deer in 1871, becoming one of the first three professors at that university. The dual professorship was divided in 1876, and he opted to retain the Chair of Natural Philosophy, which he kept till his retirement in October 1913. He was a member of the New Zealand Institute and of the Australasian Association for the Advancement of Science. In 1877 he served on the Royal Commission to enquire into the operation of the University of New Zealand.

He became a member of the Senate in 1877. He sat on the Otago Education Board from 1876 to 1896, and was chairman from 1882 to 1885. He served on the High Schools Board of Governors from 1878 to 1890 and 1898 to 1904. In 1889 the honorary degree of LL.D. was conferred upon him. Following his retirement from Otago in 1913, Shand was appointed a Companion of the Order of St Michael and St George in the 1914 New Year Honours.

Shand died on 30 November 1914 at Dunedin, about a year after his retirement, and he was buried at the Dunedin Northern Cemetery.
