= Percy Mead =

English cricketer and Indian Civil Service officer

Personal information
- Full name: Percy James Mead
- Born: 15 November 1871; Richmond, Surrey, England
- Died: 7 April 1923 (aged 51); Mahabaleshwar, Bombay Presidency, British India
- Batting: Unknown

Domestic team information
- Years: Team
- 1895/96–1903/04: Europeans

Career statistics
Competition	First-class
Matches	3
Runs scored	17
Batting average	2.83
100s/50s	–/–
Top score	7
Catches/stumpings	–/–
- Source: Cricinfo, 6 June 2022

Percy James Mead CIE CSI (15 November 1871 – 7 April 1923) was an English first-class cricketer and an officer in the Indian Civil Service in the Bombay Presidency.

The son of Lieutenant Colonel C. J. Mead, he was born at Richmond in November 1871. He was educated at Haileybury, before matriculating to King's College, Cambridge. After graduating from Cambridge, Mead entered the Indian Civil Service (ICS) in 1894. During his early years in British India, Mead played three first-class cricket matches for the Europeans cricket team in the Bombay Presidency Matches between 1895 and 1903, with little success. Mead served in a number of roles within the ICS, beginning with his appointment as an assistant magistrate and collector in Bombay, an appointment he held until 1897. He then spent two years as an administrator for Sachin State, before being appointed Under-Secretary for revenue and finance to the Government of Bombay in 1901.

Mead served as private secretary to James Monteath, the acting Governor of Bombay Presidency in 1903. His next appointment was as Talukdari Settlement Officer, an appointment he held in 1905 and 1906. In 1910, he was a Superintendent of census operations, before being appointed a junior collector in 1911. He was appointed a Companion to the Order of the Indian Empire in the 1914 New Year Honours. Mead became a senior collector in 1916, while in 1917 he was appointed Director of Industries. Two years later he was appointed Chief Secretary and Financial Secretary to the Government of Bombay. In the 1921 New Year Honours he was appointed a Companion of the Order of the Star of India. Mead's final appointment was as Commissioner of Scinde in early 1923; shortly after his appointment he died in April of that year following a short illness at Mahabaleshwar.
