= Indian Mirror =

19th century Indian newspaper

- Front page of 'The Indian Mirror', 19 April 1874
- Type: Daily newspaper
- Founder: Devendranath Tagore
- Founded: 1861

The Indian Mirror was a nineteenth century Indian periodical founded in 1861 by Man Mohan Ghosh and Devendranath Tagore. Having started as a fortnightly production, it had little competition other than the Hindoo Patriot, and later became a daily publication. Its publication ceased in 1889.
