= Royal Army Veterinary Corps =

Veterinary arm of the British Army

- Cap badge of the Royal Army Veterinary Corps incorporating Chiron
- Active: 1796–present
- Country: United Kingdom
- Branch: British Army
- Role: Animal healthcare
- Garrison/HQ: Defence Animal Centre, Melton Mowbray
- March: Quick–Drink Puppy Drink & A-Hunting We Will Go; Slow–Golden Spurs
- Equipment: Dogs, horses

Commanders
- Colonel-in-Chief: Anne, Princess Royal
- Colonel Commandant: Major General Zachary Stenning

Insignia
- Tactical Recognition Flash

The Royal Army Veterinary Corps (RAVC), known as the Army Veterinary Corps (AVC) until it gained the royal prefix on 27 November 1918, is an administrative and operational branch of the British Army responsible for the provision, training and care of animals. It is also responsible for arms and explosive, drug, mine and multiple other search disciplines. It is a small corps, forming part of the Army Medical Services.

== History ==
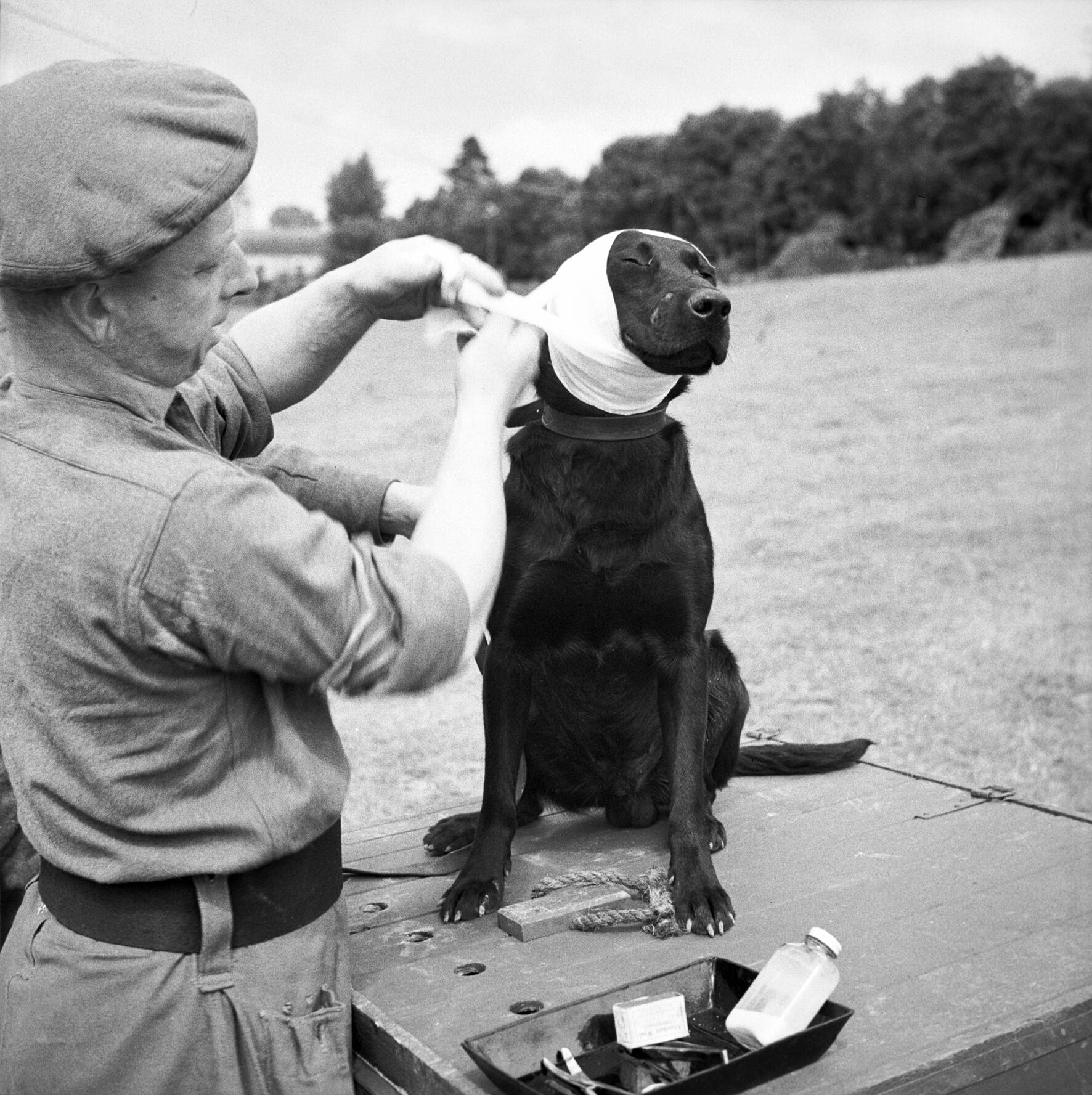
A sergeant of the RAVC bandages the wounded ear of a mine-detecting dog at Bayeux in Normandy, 5 July 1944.

The Army Veterinary Service was founded in 1796 after public outrage concerning the death of Army horses. Prior to this date, the management and care of army horses had been left to each individual regiment's Quartermaster, who (using government-contracted farriers) inspected animals on the march and saw to shoeing, stabling and other routine matters. Individual cavalry officers were expected to acquire a knowledge of 'the diseases which horses are subject to, and the medicines proper to be applied'.

In 1795 a veterinary surgeon, William Stockley, was appointed on a trial basis for six months to the 1st Fencible Cavalry Regiment. The experiment was a success, and in April the following year a Board of Cavalry Officers recommended that a veterinary surgeon should be attached to each regiment of cavalry, agreeing to defray the costs of three years' training for up to six men per year at the recently established Veterinary College of London. At the same time, Edward Coleman, Principal of the Veterinary College, was appointed 'Principal Veterinary Surgeon to the Cavalry and Veterinary Surgeon to the Board of Ordnance'. With regard to the cavalry, his duties were to recommend veterinary surgeons for regimental appointments, and to inspect the horses of regiments 'when ordered to do so by the Commander-in-Chief or by the commanding Officers'. He was also contracted to supply 'Horse Medicines', and, as Principal of the College, was closely involved in the process of veterinary training and in keeping surgeons abreast of new developments. With regard to the Board of Ordnance, he was in attendance at Woolwich (where the military establishment of the Ordnance was based) once a week, to give professional assistance in the purchase of artillery horses, advice to the resident veterinary surgeon in 'extraordinary cases', and instructions to farriers on shoeing. It was on his advice that some stables at Woolwich were set aside to serve as a hospital, and he appointed John Percivall as his assistant to reside there.

Veterinary support was required without delay for horses engaged in the ongoing French Revolutionary Wars, so Coleman initially dispensed with the three-year training requirement and instead recruited medically qualified personnel, who were offered three months' additional veterinary training. As such, John Shipp was the first veterinary surgeon to be commissioned into the British Army when he joined the 11th Light Dragoons on 25 June 1796. Sixteen veterinary surgeons were appointed the following year, and by 1801 there were 44 in total. At this time, rather than forming their own autonomous department or corps, each veterinary surgeon was recruited directly into a regiment and formed part of the regimental staff under the authority of its colonel. As well as to cavalry regiments, veterinary surgeons were appointed to other units, such as the Royal Artillery and the Royal Waggon Train.

In 1805 a sizeable Veterinary Establishment was opened on Woolwich Common to see to the equine needs of the Royal Artillery (whose Barracks were nearby). Later known as the Royal Horse Infirmary, it went on to function as a hospital, veterinary store and centre of veterinary research. John Percivall was provided with quarters there; and in 1816 he took over as Senior Veterinary Surgeon of the Ordnance from Edward Coleman (the latter remaining P.V.S. to the Army until his death more than 20 years later).

In the years that followed the terms of service of military veterinary surgeons was put on a sounder footing, and systems and regulations were drawn up for the performance of their duties. By the mid-1850s there were sixty-four serving veterinary surgeons, of whom forty-three went with their units to the war in Crimea; however, as with the other military support services involved, lack of co-ordination and proper facilities severely hampered their work and led to criticism. As a result of the war, the Board of Ordnance was abolished and the Army's veterinary service reconfigured.

=== Army Veterinary Department ===
The Board of Ordnance (which was separate from the Army and included the Royal Artillery and the Royal Engineers as part of its establishment) had always maintained its own veterinary service; but following the abolition of the Board and the transfer of its troops to the Army, the separate veterinary services were brought together under a single Principal Veterinary Surgeon (P.V.S.) in 1859. That year, all Army Veterinary Surgeons were listed together for the first time in the official Army List, under the heading 'Veterinary Medical Department' (the word 'Medical' being dropped two years later). It was, however, a department more in name than in practice, since veterinary surgeons once appointed still remained attached to a regiment and answerable to its colonel.

The Royal Horse Infirmary, Woolwich became the de facto headquarters of the Department: the Principal Veterinary Surgeon was based (and housed) there, and newly-commissioned officers attended there to receive instruction. As well as the Royal Field Artillery and the Royal Horse Artillery (both of which used large numbers of horses), the Horse Transport Branch of the Army Service Corps was based in Woolwich, which provided the Army's main land transport capability.

In the 1860s an attempt was made to codify operational arrangements for the Army Veterinary Service in wartime, with provision being made for the first time for the treatment of sick and injured animals at field depots.

In 1876, James Collins was appointed Principal Veterinary Surgeon; the role was now considered part of the War Office Staff, and he was based in Pall Mall rather than Woolwich. Collins lobbied for surgeons to be fully organised on a departmental basis. He had a degree of success: in 1878 the regimental system of veterinary care was abolished except for the cavalry. From the following year, under a newly-centralised Army Veterinary Service, a general list of non-regimental veterinary officers was available to any unit. Then, in 1881, a fully-unified Army Veterinary Department came into being when abolition of the regimental system of veterinary care was extended to all cavalry units (with the exception of the Household Cavalry, where a regimental veterinary surgeon is retained to this day).

James Collins also played a key role in establishing the Army Veterinary School in Aldershot in 1880. Initially established in the Infirmary Stables alongside one of the cavalry barracks, it instructed army officers in the care of animals, basic veterinary first aid and the selection of remounts, while at the same time instructing army veterinary surgeons in military duties and veterinary knowledge relevant to particular combat situations (including tropical diseases, which were prevalent among army animals at the time). In 1890 there were reported to be 3,312 army horses in Aldershot Camp: 1,814 belonging to cavalry regiments, 750 to the Royal Artillery (312 riding and 438 draught horses), 397 horses (and mules) pertaining to the Army Service Corps, and 262 to the Royal Engineers (the rest being attached to officers of the infantry regiments). In 1899 the School moved into more permanent premises, later known as Fitzwygram House.

In 1887 a separate Army Remount Service was established (responsible for supplying the army with replacement horses and mules). Against veterinary advice, the decision was taken in 1898 to remove provision for sick and injured animals from the war establishment, and to merge provision of field veterinary hospitals with that of field remount depots, with the result that, in the Second Boer War, disease spread rapidly and unchecked: 326,000 horses and 51,000 mules died in the conflict, very few as a result of enemy action. Faced with stringent criticism, the government established a committee of inquiry to make recommendations as to the improvement of army veterinary services. The committee reported in 1903, recommending among other things a comprehensive restructuring of the Department.

=== Army Veterinary Corps ===
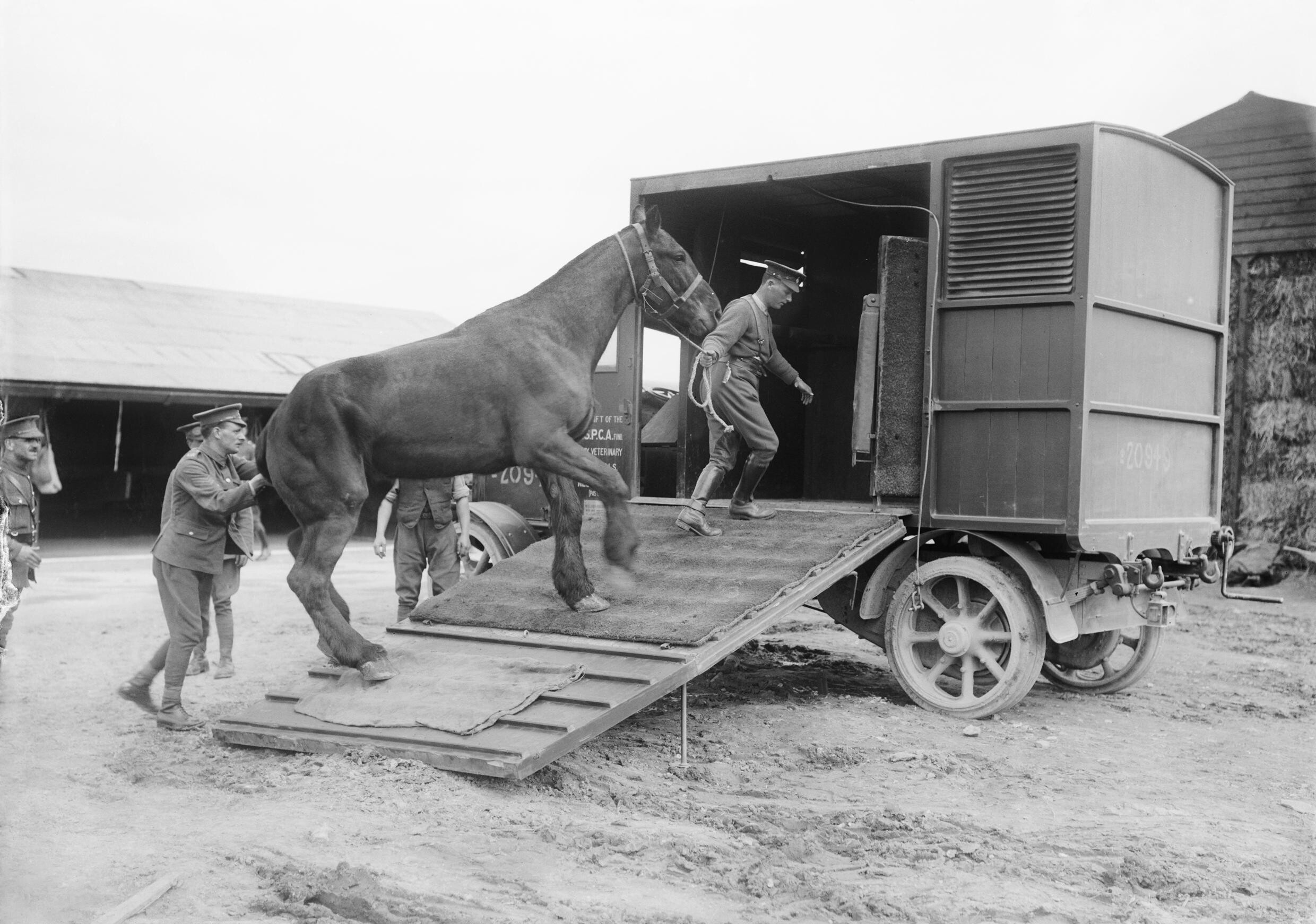
The Army Veterinary Corps on the Western Front, 1914–1918

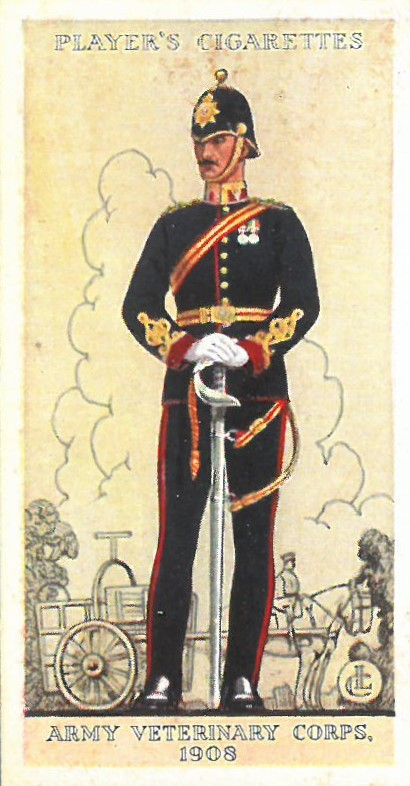
Player's cigarette card showing an officer of the Army Veterinary Corps in full dress

The Army Veterinary Department consisted only of officers; no provision was made for trained subordinate staff, a situation that began to be remedied by the formation in 1903 of an Army Veterinary Corps into which other ranks were drafted. Three years later the Corps amalgamated with the Department to form a single unit (the Army Veterinary Corps) of officers, NCOs and men.

The 1903 report had also recommended the building of new veterinary hospitals, first in Woolwich and Aldershot, and then in Bulford and Curragh, each staffed by an AVC unit. (This was met with resistance from senior cavalry officers, who resisted the encroachment on their regiments of establishments which were not under their command.) Woolwich was designated as the Corps Depot; a large mobilization and reserve store was built there alongside the new hospital. At Aldershot the old infirmary stables were extended to form the new hospital, with new accommodation for sixty horses provided, plus an isolation ward and an operating theatre; it was completed in 1910. During World War I temporary wooden stables were added to provide space for over a thousand animals.

During the First World War almost half the veterinary surgeons in Britain served as officers in the AVC, and the number of other ranks in the Corps grew from 934 to 41,755. Innovations included provision of Mobile Veterinary Sections, to transfer sick and wounded horses to veterinary hospitals, and camel specialists, who staffed hospital facilities in Egypt. As well as serving on the Western Front, the AVC was deployed with animals to such contrasting theatres of war as Gallipoli, Salonika, Mesopotamia, Italy and Palestine.

=== Royal Army Veterinary Corps ===
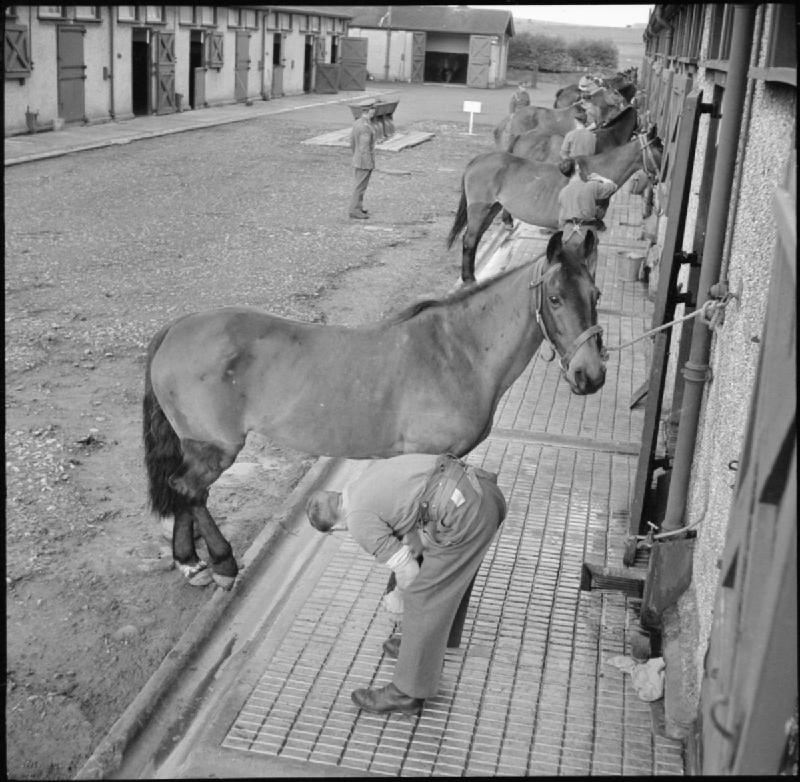
Convalescent horses at the RAVC hospital at Tidworth Camp, Wiltshire, in the Second World War

In 1918 the Corps was given its Royal prefix in recognition of its service through the First World War. At the time the Quartermaster-General wrote:

The Corps by its initiative and scientific methods has placed military veterinary organisation on a higher plane. The high standard which it has maintained at home and throughout all theatres has resulted in a reduction of animal wastage, an increased mobility of mounted units and a mitigation of animal suffering un-approached in any previous military operation.

Demobilisation after the war was followed by mechanisation, and consequentially the RAVC was greatly reduced in size. 1938 saw the closure of the Army Veterinary School in Aldershot.

Nevertheless, animals would still be required by the army, especially where there was rough terrain or other conditions with which motor vehicles struggled to cope. During World War II the strength of the Corps increased from 85 officers and 105 other ranks, to a total of 519 officers and 3,939 other ranks. By 1942 the Army had 6,500 horses, 10,000 mules and 1,700 camels in service. That year the work of the Army Remount Service was taken over by the RAVC; in Italy, there was a high incidence of battle casualties among mules (used in large numbers for transport due to the difficult terrain) and the Corps was engaged in their procurement as well as their treatment.

In 1939, the Corps Depot had moved from Woolwich as a wartime precaution (the area being prone to aerial bombardment); as No.1 Reserve Veterinary Hospital, Depot and Training Establishment it occupied Doncaster Racecourse for the duration of the war, before relocating to Melton Mowbray (where there was a Remount depot) in February 1946.

During the war the Army Veterinary and Remount Services took on responsibility for providing the army with dogs. In the years since the Second World War, dogs have become the main animal to be engaged in combat situations.

The RAVC survived the amalgamation of the other Army Medical Services in late 2024 and remained independent of the newly formed Royal Army Medical Service due to their legal and operational combatant status which differed from the special protected status of the other corps.

== Function ==
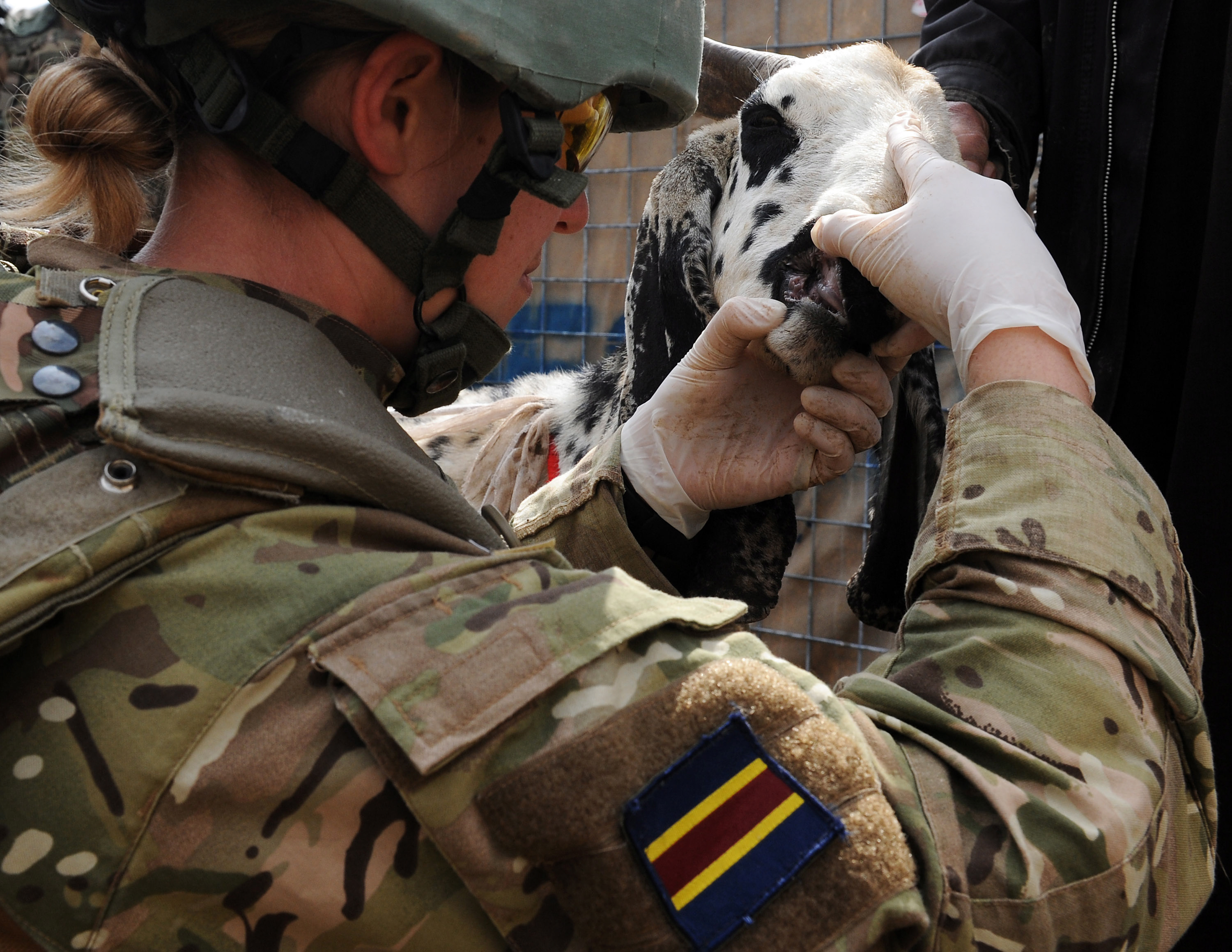
A RAVC Officer checks the health of local livestock, Afghanistan, 2011.

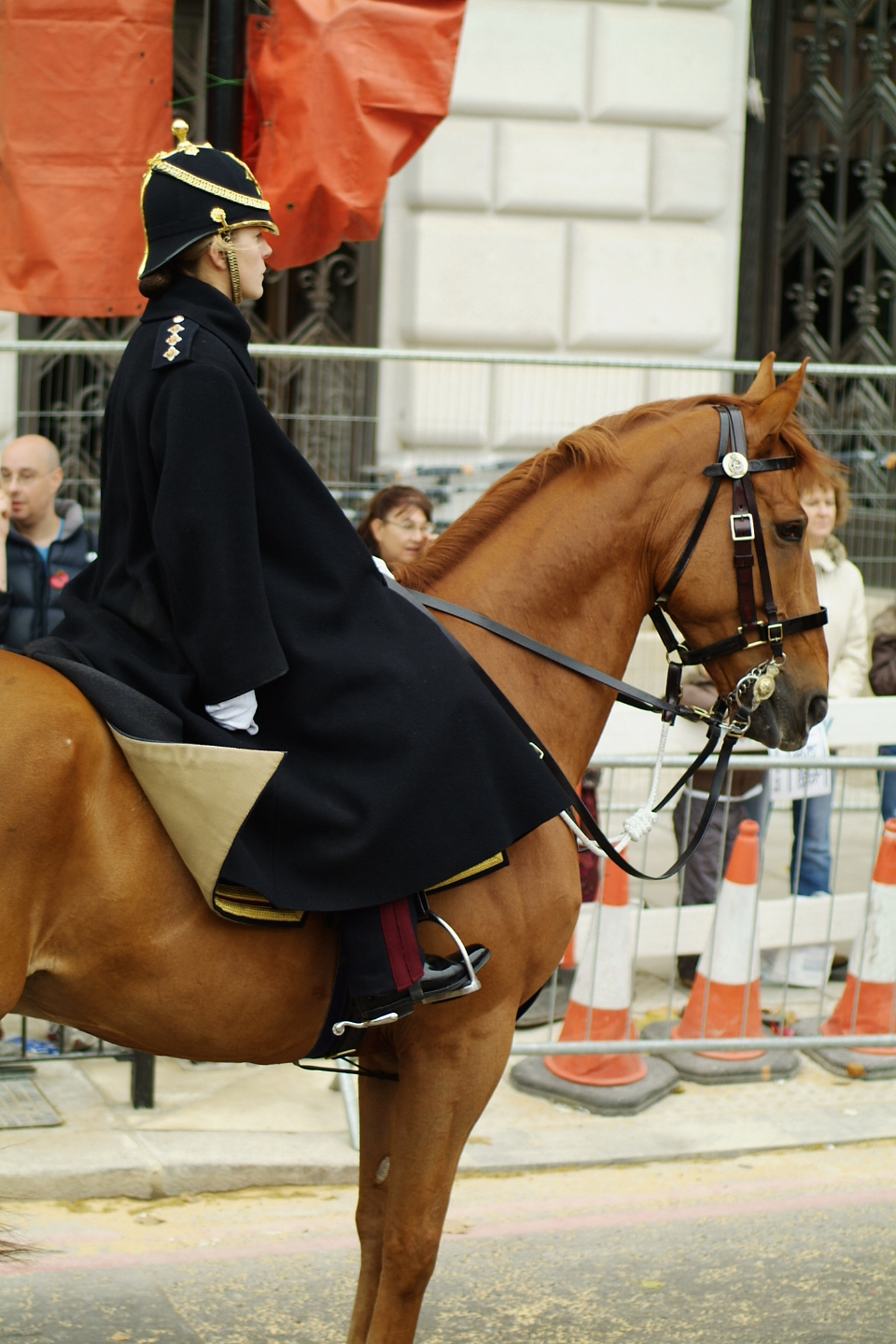
Officer of the RAVC accompanying the King's Troop, Royal Horse Artillery, at a ceremonial event

The RAVC provides, trains and cares for mainly dogs and horses, but also tends to the various regimental mascots in the army, which range from goats to an antelope. Personnel include veterinary surgeons and veterinary technicians providing medical and surgical care to animals, and handlers who train dogs and deploy with them on operational service. Dogs are used extensively in the theatre of war, and are organised within the 1st Military Working Dog Regiment (see below). Horses are used primarily for ceremonial purposes, although the Corps continues to rehearse procedures for the operational deployment of horses. This is explained on its website in these terms:

Although there is unlikely ever be a significantly large requirement for equines in future military operations, there are scenarios where ground conditions, (in situations where stealth is required or helicopters are not available for example), could make pack transport a vital solution to the need.

== Structure ==
The main location for the RAVC is at Melton Mowbray in Leicestershire, although staff are spread throughout the Army.

The Corps has subsidiary regiments:

- 1st Military Working Dog Regiment
- Defence Animal Training Regiment

== Honours ==
Sadie, a black Labrador Retriever belonging to 102 MWDSU and cared for by handler Lance Corporal Karen Yardley, won the PDSA Dickin Medal ("the animals' VC") in 2007.

On 24 July 2008, Lance Corporal Kenneth Michael Rowe of the RAVC and attached to 2nd Battalion, The Parachute Regiment, was killed along with his search dog Sasha, during a contact with the Taliban in Helmand Province, Afghanistan.

In February 2010, Treo, a black Labrador-Spaniel crossbreed, was awarded the Dickin Medal for services in Afghanistan.

In 2011 Lance Corporal Liam Tasker of 104 MWD Squadron was killed in Helmand Province, Afghanistan. He was posthumously mentioned in despatches. His Arms Explosive search dog, Theo, died shortly afterwards. Theo was posthumously awarded the Dickin Medal on 25 October 2012.

== Memorials ==
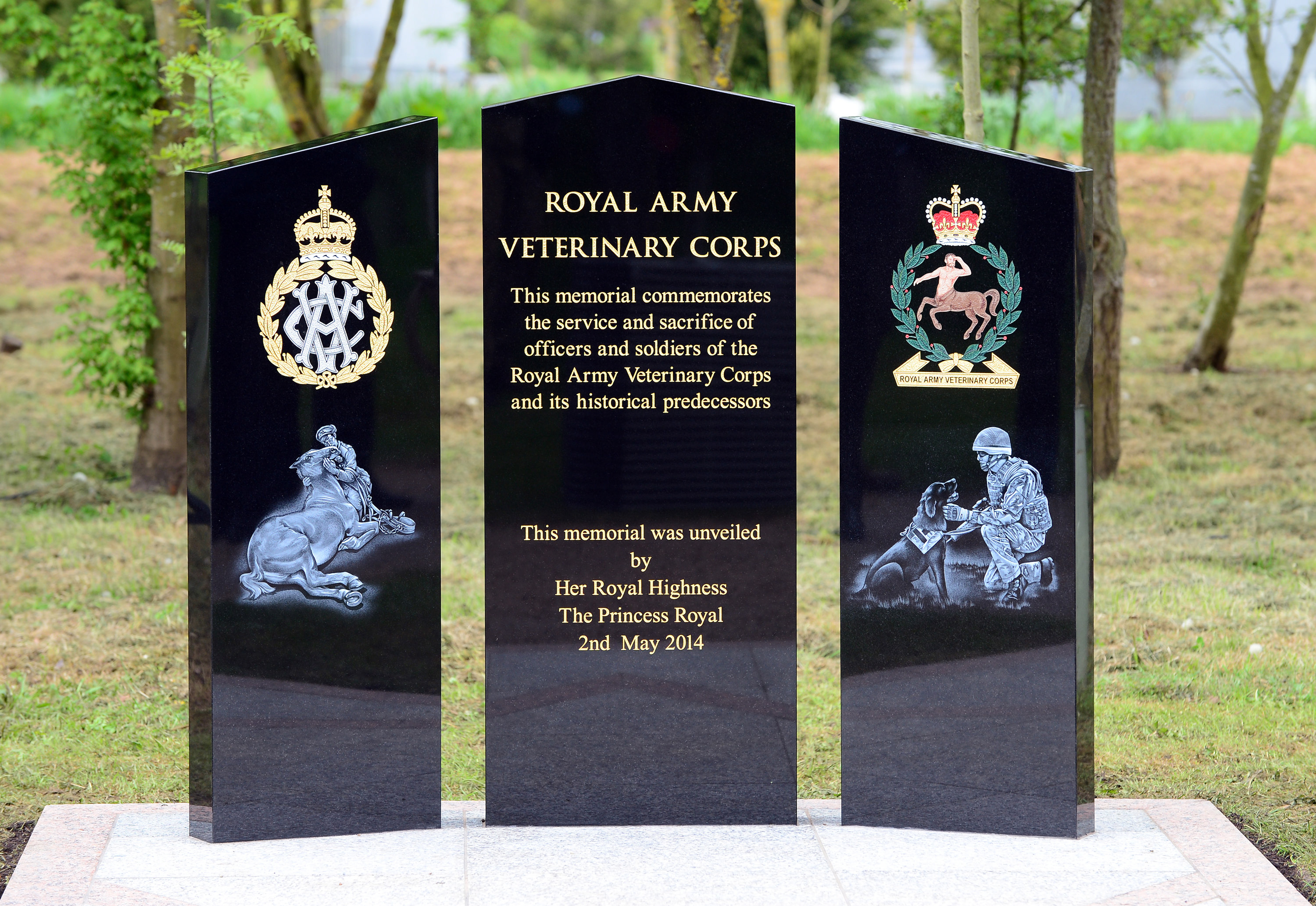
RAVC Memorial, National Memorial Arboretum

A memorial to the RAVC and its predecessors was unveiled at the National Memorial Arboretum on 2 May 2014 by the Princess Royal. Seven memorial stones in remembrance of the five dog handlers who lost their lives while serving in Northern Ireland and the two dog handlers who were killed while on operations in Afghanistan have been placed at their base in North Luffenham.

== Built heritage ==
In late March 2016, the Ministry of Defence announced that Fitzwygram House in Aldershot (also known as the Royal Army Veterinary Centre), was one of ten sites that would be sold in order to reduce the size of the Defence estate. Built in 1899 for the Army Veterinary School, the building contained a library, laboratories, teaching and demonstration rooms (which remained in use after the closure of the School). It contains a plaque which reads:

This school was founded through the representations of James Collins esq, Principal Veterinary Surgeon to the forces and Major General Sir Frederick Fitzwygram, Bart FRCVS commanding the Cavalry Brigade, Aldershot, 1st June 1880.

While the house itself is due to be converted for civilian use, the stable complex behind it was scheduled to be demolished. This (a surviving combination of mid-19th century cavalry infirmary stables and early twentieth century sick boxes, operating room and pharmacy) was used as a First World War horse hospital, and has been described as providing 'a unique archaeological record of that period of military veterinary history'.

== Heads of the Corps and its predecessors ==
Principal Veterinary Surgeon to the Cavalry

- 1796–1839: Professor Edward Coleman
- 1839–1854: Mr Frederick C. Cherry
- 1854–1858: Mr John Wilkinson

Medical Superintendent to the Veterinary Service of the Board of Ordnance (Artillery)

- 1796–1816: Professor Edward Coleman
- 1816–1830: Mr John Percivall
- 1830–1858: Mr William Stockley

Principal Veterinary Surgeon of the Army

- 1858–1876: Mr John Wilkinson (previously P.V.S. to the Cavalry)
- 1876–1883: Mr James Collins
- 1883–1890: Dr George Fleming

Director-General of the Army Veterinary Department

- 1891–1897: Veterinary-Colonel James Drummond Lambert CB
- 1897–1902: Veterinary-Colonel Sir Francis Duck, KCB
- 1902–1907: Major-General Henry Thomson, CB

Director-General Army Veterinary Services

- 1907–1910: Major-General Sir Frederick Smith KCMG, CB
- 1910–1917: Major-General Sir Robert Pringle, KCMG, CB, DSO
- 1917–1921: Major-General Sir Layton Blenkinsop KCB, DSO
- 1921–1925: Major-General William Dunlop Smith CB, CMG, DSO
- 1925–1929: Major-General Henry T. Sawyer CB, DSO
- 1929–1933: Major-General William S. Anthony CB, CMG
- 1933–1937: Major-General James J. B. Tapley CB, DSO

Director Army Veterinary Services

- 1937–1940: Brigadier Charles Allison Murray CBE

Director Royal Army Veterinary Corps

- 1990–1994 Brigadier Andrew Parker Bowles OBE

Director Army Veterinary and Remount Services

- 1994–1997 Brigadier Paul G H Jepson QHVS
- 1997–2001 Brigadier Andrew H Roache QHVS
- 2001–2007 Brigadier Andrew S Warde CBE QHVS
- 2007–2011 Brigadier Tom S Ogilvie-Graham MBE QHVS
- 2011–2014 Colonel Neil C Smith QHVS
- 2014–2017 Douglas A Macdonald QHVS

Chief Veterinary Officer

- 2017–2019 Colonel Neil C Smith QHVS

Chief Veterinary and Remount Officer

- 2020–2026 Colonel Mark C E Morrison QHVS
- 2026 to present Colonel Michael R Robinson KHVS

== Order of precedence ==
Preceded by Adjutant General's Corps	Order of Precedence	Succeeded by Small Arms School Corps
