= George Rainy (civil servant) =

British colonial administrator and civil servant

Sir George Rainy, KCSI, KCIE (11 February 1875 – 27 January 1946) was a British colonial administrator in India. A member of the Indian Civil Service, he was member of the Governor-General's Executive Council in charge of the Commerce and Railway Departments from 1927 to 1932.
