= Sir Frederick Eley, 1st Baronet =

British banker

Sir Frederick Eley Bt

Chairman of the Bank of British West Africa
- In office 1942–1948

Chairman of Crosse & Blackwell
- In office 1932–1946

Personal details
- Born: 22 November 1866 Shrewsbury, Shropshire, England
- Died: 7 February 1951 (aged 84)
- Occupation: Banker

Sir Frederick Eley, 1st Baronet (22 November 1866 – 7 February 1951) was an English banker.

Eley was born in Shrewsbury and educated at Shrewsbury School. He joined the National Provincial Bank and rose to the post of general manager with a seat on the board of directors. He was also chairman of John Waddington Ltd, Cope & Timmins, Crosse & Blackwell Ltd (1932–1946), the Waldorf Hotel Company, and the Bank of British West Africa (1942–1948). He was chairman of the Chelsea Hospital for Women and was a prominent racehorse owner.

Announced in the 1921 New Year Honours, he was created a baronet of Sagamore in the parish of Shiplake in the County of Oxford on 14 January 1921.

Eley died on 7 February 1951, aged eighty-four. His cremated ashes were buried at Stoke Poges, Buckinghamshire.

== Footnotes ==
Baronetage of the United Kingdom
| New creation | Baronet (of Sagamore); 1921–1951 | Extinct |
