= Hugh Charles Sampson =

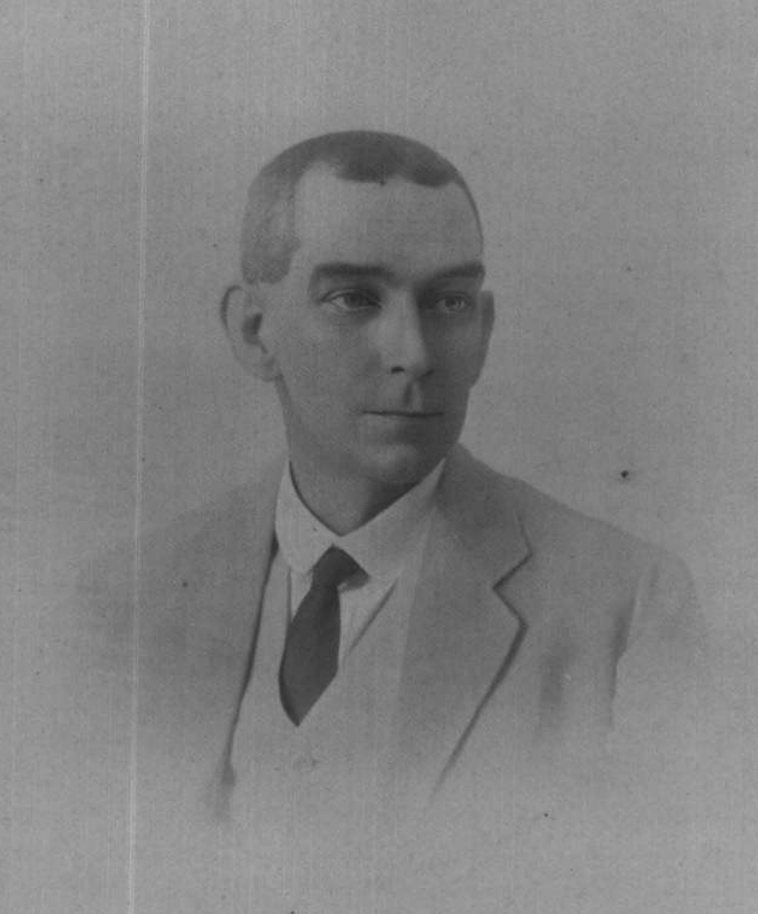

Hugh Charles Sampson (2 May 1878 – 29 November 1953) was a British agronomist and economic botanist. He served as a director of agriculture in the Madras Presidency and later served as the first economic botanist at the Royal Botanic Gardens, Kew.

Sampson was born in Shimla to Arthur Birks and Marianne Shipton. He studied at Bedford School and went to the University of Edinburgh before going to the Transvaal to serve in the department of agriculture in 1903. In 1905 he moved to India to work in the Madras Presidency as an agricultural expert. He married Mary Southern at Hubli in 1907. In 1906, he was one of the first to joined the Indian Agricultural Service as an officer and worked at Tirunelveli. He worked on agricultural improvement through newer technology in implements and in introducing long-staple cotton from Cambodia where he had visited. He was made Companion of the Order of the Indian Empire in 1921. In 1923 he left the agriculture service from the position of director of agriculture, Madras, and went to Nyasaland under the Empire Cotton Growing Corporation and was involved in experiments and establishing cotton seed supplies. In 1927 he became an economic botanist at the Royal Botanic Gardens, Kew, under the Empire Marketing Board. He worked for many colonial projects including to the Caribbean, Nyasaland and Swaziland. He published lists of the cultivated crops in the British Empire and retired in 1938. His position as economic botanist was succeeded by Sir Geoffrey Evans.
