= Frank Herbert Brown =

Journalist

Sir Frank Herbert Brown CIE (1868–1959) was an English journalist, on the editorial staff of The Times from 1929 to 1954. He was a recognised authority on Indian affairs.

== Life ==
He was born 13 March 1868, a younger son of the Rev. Joseph Brown, a Baptist minister of Upwell in Norfolk, near Wisbech. His first experience as a journalist was with the Cambridgeshire Times, based at March.

In India, Brown worked on the Bombay Gazette for five years, as a leader writer and assistant editor. He then moved to Lucknow and the Indian Daily Telegraph.

Suffering from malaria, Brown returned to the United Kingdom, where for many years he was a freelance journalist. He was London correspondent of the Times of India, and assiduously built a network of Indian contacts. He witnessed the 1909 assassination of Curzon Wyllie. He joined the editorial staff of The Times of London, to which he had contributed often from 1902, in 1929.

In a letter to the editor of The Times in March 1931, Brown contradicted the claim made by Winston Churchill that the Gandhi–Irwin Pact had conceded all the Congress Party's demands. He was present at the 1940 assassination of Michael O'Dwyer. In 1944, speaking at a London meeting of the Baptist Board, he expressed the opinion that the rise of Indian nationalism had occurred because "the British themselves had awakened the spirit of nationalism".

Suffering from bad eyesight, Brown gave up his major positions in 1954. He died at home in London in 1959, at age 90.

== Associations ==
At the beginning of the 1920s, Brown was one of the group of specialist advisers on India around Edwin Montagu, with Thomas Jewell Bennett, Valentine Chirol, Evan Cotton, James Lovat-Fraser and C. P. Scott. He was one of the press figures lobbied at the time of the 1923 Imperial Conference by Tej Bahadur Sapru, with Stanley Reed and A. P. Penman of Reuters.

Brown was a correspondent of Malcolm Hailey, who revealed to him 1927 discussions with Zafrullah Khan and Safraat Ahmed Khan (1893–1947), and George Abraham Grierson. In 1928 he wrote to Mahatma Gandhi about The Story of My Experiments with Truth, receiving a reply referring to their meetings in London from 1906. Papers of Brown went to the India Office Library, including extensive correspondence with Gilbert Laithwaite, secretary to Viceroy Victor Hope, 2nd Marquess of Linlithgow.

Brown became secretary of the East India Association of London, which brought together former British officials in India with Indians. He held the position from 1927 to 1954. A letter of Ian Stephens to Brown led to a yoga demonstration by Buddha Bose in Caxton Hall, on 10 October 1938.

In 1945 Frank Anthony, opposed to the Indian independence movement, recruited Brown and Stanley Reed for the London committee of the All India Anglo-Indian Association. The other members were Harry Graham Haig as President, Hailey, the churchmen Eyre Chatterton and Philip Loyd, Woodrow Wyatt MP, Geoffrey Rothe Clarke, the Anglo-Indian Eric Pound of India House, and Mary Tyrwhitt-Drake.

== Awards and honours ==
Brown was made a Fellow of the Institute of Journalists in 1911, and became a Companion of the Order of the Indian Empire (CIE) in 1921. He was knighted in 1937. He became a Fellow of the Royal Society of Arts in 1940.

== Works ==
Brown wrote a number of articles for the 1912 supplement to the Dictionary of National Biography. India, the organ of the British committee of the Indian National Congress, that year regarded his biography of Romesh Chunder Dutt as "on the whole, written both impartially and sympathetically", while also raising a point about an exchange between Dutt and Lord Curzon. He edited Sva (1915), a collection of essays on India by George Birdwood.

He was involved also editorially in the production of:

- Princes and Chiefs of India. A Collection of Biographies and Portraits of the Indian Princes and Chiefs and Brief Historical Surveys of the Territories, F.S. Jehangir Taléyarkhan, (Waterlow, 1903, 3 vols.)
- Impressions of British life and character on the occasion of a European tour 1913 (Macmillan, 1914) by Meherban Narayanrao Babasaheb, Chief of Ichalkaranji. Brown alluded to this book in an article "Indian Feudatory States" appearing in the Indian Review for November 1928, written at the period of the Harcourt Butler Committee on princely states, as arguing in a way representative of submissions from the states to the committee. The article was reprinted in Feudatory States under Indian Princes (1929) by Vasudev Vithal Rajwade, a Marathi historian of Ichalkaranji.
