= Newcastle upon Tyne City Police =

Former city police force

Agency overview
- Formed: 1836
- Dissolved: 1969
- Legal personality: Police force

Jurisdictional structure
- Operations jurisdiction: Newcastle upon Tyne
- Area: 114 km^{2} (44 sq mi)
- Legal jurisdiction: England & Wales
- General nature: Local civilian police

Operational structure
- Headquarters: Pilgrim Street, Newcastle, Northumberland
- Constables: approx. 1,000 (at peak)
- Parent agency: Home Office

Newcastle upon Tyne City Police was the Home Office police force and a constabulary that served the city of Newcastle upon Tyne.

== History ==
It was formed in 1836 when Newcastle was one of Europe's biggest industrial cities. It was the first modern police force, formed three years before the County Police Act 1839. The force had stations at Pilgrim Street in the City Centre, Arthur's Hill, Headlam Street, and Red Barnes, with section stations at Walker, Heaton, Kenton and Benwell village. The Pilgrim Street and Headlam street stations were also fire stations. Each foot beat had a large police box where officers could rest and 'ring-in' to their main station and the public had access to a phone for advice or to summon help.

At its peak Newcastle City had almost 1,000 police officers with MGB sports cars in its motor patrol fleet as well as its own specially tailored uniforms. On 1 April 1969 it was amalgamated into the Northumberland Constabulary under the Police Act 1964.

Newcastle upon Tyne City Police lost its identity after the 1969 mergers when the new Northumberland Constabulary was formed. Based at Pilgrim Street police station (now closed and relocated at Forth Banks), the old Newcastle City police HQ, like many multifunctional police forces, also housed the Magistrates Courts and fire station. It was designed by Cackett, Burns, Dick and MacKellar and opened in 1934. The classical elements of Corinthian columns and Egyptian solidity is clearly present, and it is also noted for its mock Babylonian sculptures. It only ended its use as police headquarters after the establishment of Northumbria Police after 1974 which moved to Ashington, then Ponteland sometime later. It also housed one of the two server storage systems for Northumbria Police that backs up and shares contingency information (disaster recovery) with its twin in Ponteland. This changed in 2011 when a new computer system became operational, and the disaster recovery system was moved to South Shields.
