= Northumberland Constabulary =

Agency overview
- Formed: 1 April 1969
- Preceding agencies: Newcastle upon Tyne City Police; Northumberland County Constabulary; Tynemouth Borough Police
- Dissolved: 31 March 1974
- Superseding agency: Northumbria Police
- Legal personality: Government agency

Jurisdictional structure
- Operations jurisdiction: Northumberland
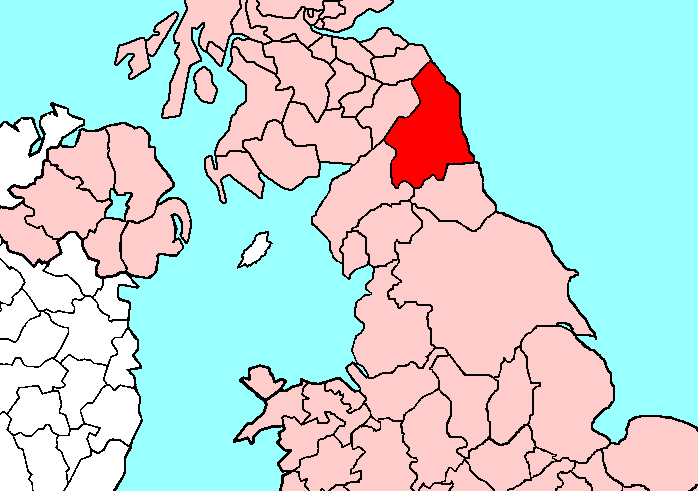
- Map of the Northumberland Constabulary's operational area
- Legal jurisdiction: England & Wales
- General nature: Local civilian police

Operational structure
- Headquarters: Pilgrim Street, Newcastle
- Parent agency: Home Office

Northumberland Constabulary was the Home Office police force for the county of Northumberland, England, from 1969 until 1974.

Northumberland County Constabulary absorbed Berwick-upon-Tweed Borough Police in 1921 and Northumberland Constabulary was created with the amalgamation of Northumberland County Constabulary with Newcastle upon Tyne Borough Police and Tynemouth Borough Police in 1969, more than doubling its strength. In 1974 it merged with part of Durham Constabulary to form Northumbria Police.

In 1965, before the Newcastle and Tynemouth forces merged, the force had an establishment of 754 officers and an actual strength of 697.

List of Chief Constables

- 15 January 1857 – 15 October 1869 : Major Alexander Browne
- 1 November 1869 – 9 January 1886 : Major-General George Allgood CB
- 29 March 1886 – 15 March 1900 : Captain Herbert Durell Terry (appointed Inspector of Constabulary for England and Wales, 1900)
- 4 July 1900 – 5 September 1935 : Captain Fullarton James CBE (later Sir Fullarton James Bart., CBE)
- 6 September 1935 – 30 January 1943 : Captain Henry Studdy (later Captain Sir Henry Studdy CBE Chief Constable of West Riding of Yorkshire Constabulary))
- 15 March 1943 – 30 November 1946 : (Sir) Joseph Simpson, OBE (later Deputy Commissioner Metropolitan Police)
- 1 December 1946 – 30 September 1953 : Francis J Armstrong MBE (later Her Majesty's Inspector of Constabulary)
- 1 December 1953 – 1963 : Alan Ure Reith Scroggie, BL
- 1963–1965 : Clarence H Cooksley retired 1975 after Northumberland County Constabulary amalgamated with Tynemouth Borough Police and Newcastle City Police in 1969 to become Northumberland Constabulary and then Northumbria Police on 1 April 1974
