= Hubert Grant-Dalton =

Royal Navy Admiral (1862–1934)

Admiral Hubert Grant-Dalton, CB (21 July 1862 – 22 April 1934) was a Royal Navy officer. During his career of nearly 40 years, he served in numerous small vessels, participated in three punitive expeditions in Africa, and commanded a cruiser during the first years of the First World War.

== Royal Navy career ==
Grant-Dalton joined the Royal Navy. He was promoted to lieutenant on 21 June 1884, and to commander on 31 December 1895. From November 1900 until January 1903, Grant-Dalton was in command of the cruiser HMS Bellona, serving in the Home Fleet.
