= Alexander George Boyle =

British colonial administrator (1872–1943)

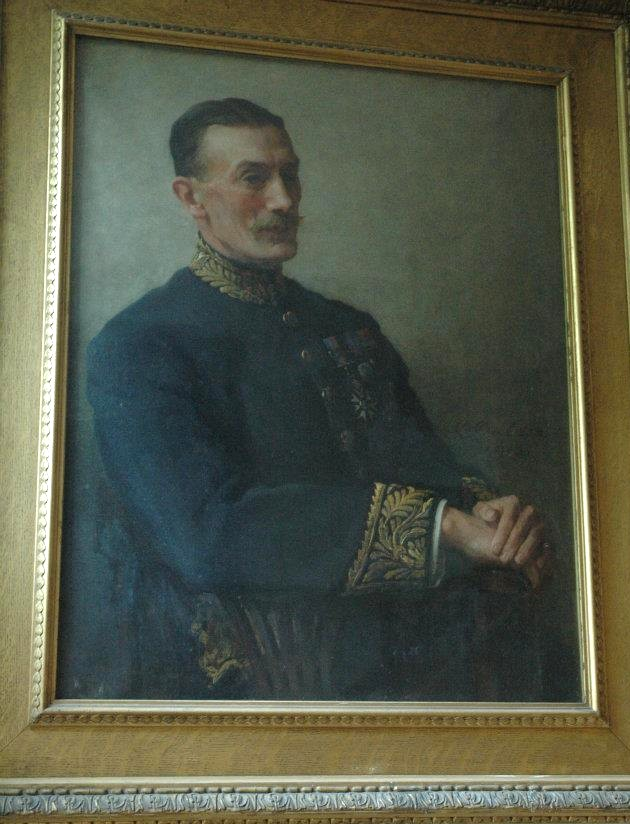
Sir Alexander Boyle painted by Catherine Ouless c.1913

Sir Alexander George Boyle Esq. CMG. CBE., (6 Mar 1872 - 19 Apr 1943) also known as A.G. Boyle in Lagos, Colonial Nigeria, was a British colonial administrator who served as Lieutenant-Governor of the Southern Provinces, He was an acting governor around mid-1919 and also one time deputy governor under Sir Frederick Lugard's tenure. Boyle Street in Lagos Island is named after him. He married Sibyl Blanche Hodgson (the daughter of Charterhouse School Housemaster Rev James Thomas Hodgson) in 1898 in Teddington. They had five sons.

== Publications ==
- Southern Nigeria Report for 1913: By A.G. Boyle. Letter of Transmittal of the Governor-general Frederick Lugard. Presented to Both Houses of Parliament by Command of His Majesty. January, 1915

== See also ==
- Colonial Service
