= Sven Hansen =

Welsh shipowner and shipbuilder (1876–1958)

Sir Sven Hansen Bt MBE
- Born: Sven Wohlford Hansen; 1 April 1876; South Wales
- Died: 9 October 1958 (aged 82)
- Occupations: Shipowner, shipbuilder

Sir Sven Wohlford Hansen, 1st Baronet, MBE (1 April 1876 – 9 October 1958) was a Welsh shipowner and shipbuilder.

Hansen was born in South Wales, the son of Carl Frederick Hansen, a shipowner of Scandinavian extraction. He initially joined his father's business, but later branched out on his own. His Cardiff Hall Steamship Line became one of the largest operating out of the Bristol Channel ports and was especially successful during the First World War.

He also revived the shipbuilding industry in the Devon town of Bideford after a lapse of fifty years, establishing the Hansen Shipbuilding and Ship-repairing Co Ltd.

Hansen was appointed Member of the Order of the British Empire (MBE) in the 1920 civilian war honours for his services to shipping and created a baronet in the 1921 New Year Honours for his services to Bideford. For many years he was commemorated annually in the town.

== Footnotes ==
Baronetage of the United Kingdom
New creation	Baronet (of Bideford); 1921–1958	Extinct
