= Worley baronets =

Extinct baronetcy in the Baronetage of the United Kingdom

The Worley Baronetcy, of Ockshott in the County of Surrey, was a title in the Baronetage of the United Kingdom. It was created on 23 January 1928 for Sir Arthur Worley, managing director of the North British and Mercantile Insurance Company. The title became extinct on his death in 1937.

== Worley baronets, of Ockshott (1928) ==
- Sir Arthur Worley, CBE, 1st and last Baronet (1871–1937) was born at Newton Heath, Manchester, to Philip Worley, carpenter and master builder, and his wife Elizabeth (Hunt). He left school at age fourteen and entered the London and Lancashire Insurance office. He rose through the Railway Passengers Assurance Company to be managing director of the North British and Mercantile Insurance Company. He served on the Royal Commission on Pensions and National Insurance and was President of the British Insurance Association. He is buried in East Finchley Cemetery.

Worley married Edith, daughter of Thomas Kay of Pendleton. They had two daughters who survived them, and a son who died in 1916. Lady Worley created a fine garden at Oxshott and improved another at Meudon Vean in Cornwall.
