= Randolph Frank Ollive Foote =

Royal Navy Admiral (1853–1931)

Admiral Sir Randolph Frank Ollive Foote, KCB, CMG (14 May 1853 – 28 November 1931) was a Royal Navy officer. A gunnery and ordnance specialist, he held several senior appointments in ordnance administration during his career.

The son of Captain John Foote, RN and the grandson of Vice-Admiral Sir Edward James Foote, Randolph Foote joined HMS Britannia as a cadet in April 1867. In 1897, he took part in the Benin Expedition as captain of HMS Forte, and for his service he was mentioned in despatches and appointed a CMG.

By then a captain, he was in April 1903 appointed in command of the battleship HMS Ocean, on its recommissioning after a refit on the China station.

In 1916, he was appointed a temporary major in the British Army.
