= National Health Insurance Joint Committee =

The National Health Insurance Joint Committee existed from 1911 to 1948. It consisted of representatives of the Insurance Commissions for England, Scotland, Wales, and Ireland, whose work the committee coordinated.
