= Madras Legislative Council (1861–1891) =

The first Indian Councils Act 1861 (24 & 25 Vict. c. 67) set up the Madras Legislative Council as an advisory body through which the colonial administration obtained advice and assistance. The act empowered the provincial governor to nominate four non-English Indian members to the council for the first time. Under the act, the nominated members were allowed to move their own bills and vote on bills introduced in the council. However, they were not allowed to question the executive, move resolutions or examine the budget and not interfere with the laws passed by the Central Legislature. The Governor was also the president of the council and he had complete authority over when, where and how long to convene the council and what to discuss. Two members of his Executive Council and the Advocate-General of Madras were also allowed to participate and vote in the council. The Indians nominated under this act were mostly zamindars and ryotwari landowners, who often benefited from their association with the colonial government. Supportive members were often re-nominated for several terms. G. N. Gajapathi Rao was nominated eight times, Mir Humayun Jah Bahadur was a member for 23 years, T. Rama Rao and P. Chentsal Rao were members for six years each. Other prominent members during the period included C. V. Runganada Sastri, V. Bhashyam Aiyangar, S. Subramania Iyer, A. Seshayya Sastri, and C. Sankaran Nair. The council met infrequently and in some years (1874 and 1892) was not convened even once. The maximum of number of times it met in a year was eighteen. The governor preferred to convene the council at his summer retreat Udagamandalam, much to the displeasure of the Indian members. The few times when the council met, it was for only a few hours with bills and resolutions being rushed through.

== List of members ==
This is the list of the official and non-official members of the Madras Legislative Council between 1861 and 1891. The number of members in the council at a given point of time may vary due to differing appointment dates of the individual members.

Year	Governor	Officials	Non-officials
1861-1862	William Thomas Denison	1. Thomas Sydney Smith; 2. Thomas Pycroft; 3. Charles Pelly	1. Robert Orr Campbell; 2. William Reierson Arbuthnot Sr; 3. V. Sadagopacharlu
1862-1863	Edward Maltby (acting governor)	1. James Hope Grant; 2. Thomas Pycroft; 3. Charles Pelly; 4. Thomas Sydney Smith; 5. William Reierson Arbuthnot Sr	1. William Reierson Arbuthnot, Sr; 2. Robert Orr Campbell; 3. V. Sadagopacharlu; 4. John Bruce Norton; 5. Shurf-Ool-Omrah-Bahadur
1863-1864	William Thomas Denison	1. James Hope Grant; 2. Thomas Pycroft; 3. Henry Dominic Phillips; 4. Charles Pelly; 5. Sir Alexander John Arbuthnot; 6. John Bruce Norton	1. William Reierson Arbuthnot, Sr; 2. Robert Orr Campbell; 3. Shurf-Ool-Omrah-Bahadur; 4. Gazulu Lakshminarasu Chetty; 5. Edward Maltby
1864-1865	William Thomas Denison	1. John Gaspard Le Marchant; 2. Thomas Pycroft; 3. Henry Dominic Phillips; 4. Charles Pelley; 5. Sir Alexander John Arbuthnot; 6. John Bruce Norton; 7. Robert Stanton Ellis	1. Robert Orr Campbell; 2. Shurf-Ool-Omrah-Bahadur; 3. Gazulu Lakshminarasu Chetty
1865-1866	Lord Napier	1. John Gaspard Le Marchant; 2. Thomas Pycroft; 3. Henry Dominic Phillips; 4. Charles Pelly; 5. Sir Alexander John Arbuthnot; 6. Robert Stanton Ellis	1. A. F. Brown; 2. John Young; 3. Shurf-Ool-Omrah-Bahadur; 4. Gazulu Lakshminarasu Chetty
1866-1867	Lord Napier	1. Lt Gen William Anson McCleverty; 2. Henry Dominic Phillips; 3. Sir Alexander John Arbuthnot; 4. Thomas Clarke; 5. Robert Stanton Ellis; 6. John Bruce Norton	1. Alexander Forrester Brown; 2. William Reierson Arbuthnot, Sr; 3. Gazulu Lakshminarasu Chetty; 4. Mir Humayun Jah Bahadur
1867-1868	Lord Napier	1. Lt. Gen. William Anson McCleverty; 2. Henry Dominic Phillips; 3. Sir Alexander John Arbuthnot; 4. Thomas Clarke; 5. Robert Stanton Ellis; 6. John Bruce Norton; 7. V. Ramiengar	1. William Reierson Arbuthnot, Sr; 2. Mir Humayun Jah Bahadur; 3. John Charles Loch; 4. G. N. Gajapathi Rao
1869-1870	Lord Napier	1. Lt Gen William Anson McCleverty; 2. Sir Alexander John Arbuthnot; 3. James Duncan Sim; 4. Robert Stanton Ellis; 5. J. B. Norton; 6. V. Ramiengar	1. William Reierson Arbuthnot, Sr; 2. Mir Humayun Jah Bahadur; 3. John Charles Loch; 4. G. N. Gajapathi Rao
1870-1871	Lord Napier	1. Lt Gen William Anson McCleverty; 2. Sir Alexander John Arbuthnot; 3. James Duncan Sim; 4. Robert Stanton Ellis; 5. John D. Mayne; 6. V. Ramiengar	1. Mir Humayun Jah Bahadur; 2. G. N. Gajapathi Rao; 3. A. F. Browne; 4. A. Mackenzie; 5. Venkata Sanjeeva Rao
1871-1872	Lord Hobart	1. Sir Frederick Paul Haines; 2. James Duncan Sim; 3. Robert Stanton Ellis; 4. H. S. Cunningham; 5. William Huddleston; 6. Sordon Sullivan; 7. V. Ramiengar	
1872-1873	Lord Hobart	1. Sir Frederick Paul Haines; 2. James Duncan Sim; 3. William Robinson; 4. H. S. Cunningham; 5. William Huddleston; 6. V. Ramiengar	1. V. Sanjiva Rao; 2. A. F. Browne; 3. Mir Humayun Jah Bahadur; 4. G. N. Gajapathi Rao; 5. William Reierson Arbuthnot Sr
1873-1874	Lord Hobart	1. Sir Frederick Paul Haines; 2. James Duncan Sim; 3. William Rose Robinson; 4. H. S. Cunningham; 5. David Fremantle Carmichael; 6. V. Ramiengar	1. G. N. Gajapathi Rao; 2. William Reierson Arbuthnot, Sr; 3. Mir Humayun Jah Bahadur
1874-1875	Duke of Buckingham and Chandos	1. Sir Frederick Paul Haines; 2. William Rose Robinson; 3. R. S. Ellis; 4. H. S. Cunningham; 5. David Fremantle Carmichael; 6. V. Ramiengar; 7. William Huddleston	1. G. N. Gajapathi Rao; 2. Mir Humayun Jah Bahadur; 3. J. G. Coleman; 4. P. Macfadyen
1875-1876	Duke of Buckingham and Chandos	1. Sir Neville Bowles Chamberlain; 2. William Rose Robinson; 3. R. S. Ellis; 4. H. S. Cunningham; 5. V. Ramiengar; 6. William Huddleston; 7. D. F. Carmichael	1. G. N. Gajapathi Rao; 2. J. G. Coleman; 3. P. Macfayden; 4. Mir Humayun Jah Bahadur
1876-1877	Duke of Buckingham and Chandos	1. Sir Neville Bowles Chamberlain; 2. William Rose Robinson; 3. William Huddleston; 4. D. F. Carmichael; 5. V. Ramiengar; 6. Patrick O'Sullivan	1. G. N. Gajapathi Rao; 2. J. G. Coleman; 3. Mir Humayun Jah Bahadur
1877-1878	Duke of Buckingham and Chandos	1. Sir Neville Bowles Chamberlain; 2. William Huddleston; 3. D. F. Carmichael; 4. Patrick O'Sullivan	1. G. N. Gajapathi Rao; 2. J. G. Coleman; 3. Mir Humayun Jah Bahadur; 4. Raja of Pittapore; 5. A. Seshayya Sastri; 6. Alexander Mackenzie
1878-1879	Duke of Buckingham and Chandos	1. Sir Neville Bowles Chamberlain; 2. William Huddleston; 3. D. F. Carmichael; 4. V. Ramiengar; 5. Patrick O'Sullivan	1. G. N. Gajapathi Rao; 2. J. G. Coleman; 3. Mir Humayun Jah Bahadur; 4. Raja of Pittapore; 5. A. Seshayya Sastri; 6. Patrick Macfadyen
1879-1880	William Patrick Adam	1. Sir Neville Bowles Chamberlain; 2. William Huddleston; 3. D. F. Carmichael; 4. Patrick O'Sullivan; 5. Robert Davidson	1. G. N. Gajapathi Rao; 2. J. G. Coleman; 3. Mir Humayun Jah Bahadur; 4. Raja of Pittapore; 5. Patrick Macfadyen; 6. C. V. Runganada Sastri
1880-1881	Mountstuart Elphinstone	1. Sir Frederick Sleigh Roberts; 2. William Huddleston; 3. D. F. Carmichael; 4. Patrick O'Sullivan; 5. Robert Davidson; 6. Henry Edward Sullivan	1. Mir Humayun Jah Bahadur; 2. Raja of Pittapore; 3. G. N. Gajapathi Rao; 4. J. G. Coleman; 5. Patrick Macfadyen; 6. Tumalapalli Rama Rao
1881-1882	Mountstuart Elphinstone	1. Sir Frederick Sleigh Roberts; 2. D. F. Carmichael; 3. Henry Edward Sullivan; 4. Patrick O'Sullivan; 5. C. G. Master; 6. Robert Davidson	1. Mir Humayun Jah Bahadur; 2. G. N. Gajapathi Rao; 3. J. G. Coleman; 4. A. Seshayya Sastri; 5. Alexander Mackenzie; 6. Tumalapalli Rama Rao
1882-1883	Mountstuart Elphinstone	1. Sir Frederick Sleigh Roberts; 2. H. E. Sullivan; 3. C. G. Master; 4. Patrick O'Sullivan; 5. Edmund Foster Webster; 6. John Heron Maxwell Shaw-Stewart; 7. W. H. Cornish	1. Mir Humayun Jah Bahadur; 2. A. Seshayya Sastri; 3. Alexander Mackenzie; 4. G. N. Gajapathi Rao; 5. Tumalapalli Rama Rao
1883-1884	Mountstuart Elphinstone	1. Sir Frederick Sleigh Roberts; 2. H. E. Sullivan; 3. C. G. Master; 4. Patrick O'Sullivan; 5. Edmund Foster Webster; 6. John Heron Maxwell Shaw-Stewart; 7. W. H. Cornish	1. T. Rama Rao; 2. Mir Humayun Jah Bahadur; 3. Maharaja of Vizianagaram; 4. Alexander Mackenzie; 5. S. Subramania Iyer
1884-1885	Mountstuart Elphinstone	1. Sir Frederick Sleigh Roberts; 2. H. E. Sullivan; 3. C. G. Master; 4. Hale Horratio Shepherd; 5. John Heron Maxwell Shaw-Stewart; 6. William Wilson; 7. Richard Wellesley Barlow	1. Mir Humayun Jah Bahadur; 2. Maharaja of Vizianagaram; 3. S. Subramania Iyer; 4. John Alexander Brown; 5. T. Rama Rao
1885-1886	Lord Connemara	1. Charles George Arbuthnot; 2. H. M. Sullivan; 3. C. G. Master; 4. Philipp Perceval Hutchins; 5. R. W. Barlow; 6. Patrick O' Sullivan; 7. H. E. Stokes	1. John Alexander Boyson; 2. T. Rama Rao; 3. Mir Humayun Jah Bahadur; 4. Maharaja of Vizianagaram; 5. S. Subramania Iyer
1886-1887	Lord Connemara	1. Charles George Arbuthnot; 2. C. G. Master; 3. P. P. Hutchins; 4. H. E. Stokes; 5. J. H. Spring-Branson; 6. John Ord Haspard	1. Mir Humayun Jah Bahadur; 2. Maharaja of Vizianagaram; 3. S. Subramania Iyer; 4. Stewart Robertson Turnbull
1887-1888	Lord Connemara	1. Charles George Arbuthnot; 2. C. G. Master; 3. H. E. Stokes; 4. J. H. Spring-Branson; 5. John Frederick Price; 6. James Grose; 7. Vembakkam Bashyam Iyengar	1. Rajagopala Krishna Yachendra of Venkatagiri; 2. John Alexander Boyson; 3. Mir Humayun Jah Bahadur; 4. P. Chentsal Rao
1888-1889	Lord Connemara	1. Charles George Arbuthnot; 2. H. E. Stokes; 3. J. H. Garstin; 4. J. F. Price; 5. James Grose; 6. Vembakkam Bashyam Iyengar; 7. J. H. Spring-Branson	1. Mir Humayun Jah Bahadur; 2. Rajagopala Krishna Yachendra of Venkatagiri; 3. J. A. Boyson; 4. C. Sankaran Nair
1889-1890		1. Charles George Arbuthnot; 2. H. E. Stokes; 3. James Grose; 4. Henry William Bliss; 5. J. F. Price; 6. J. H. Spring-Branson	1. C. Sankaran Nair; 2. Mir Humayun Jah Bahadur; 3. Rajagopala Krishna Yachendra of Venkatagiri; 4. George Hamnett; 5. V. Bhashyam Aiyangar; 6. John Alexander Boyson
1890-1891	Lord Wenlock	1. James Charlemagne Dormer; 2. H. E. Stokes; 3. J. H. Garstin; 4. J. F. Price; 5. James Grose; 6. H. G. Wedderburn	1. Mir Humayun Jah Bahadur; 2. Rajagopala Krishna Yachendra of Venkatagiri; 3. George Hamnett; 4. Vembakkam Bashyam Iyengar; 5. J. A. Boyson; 6. C. Sankaran Nair

== See also ==
- Madras Legislative Council, 1891-1909
