= Madras Legislative Council (1891–1909) =

The Madras Legislative Council was expanded by the Indian Councils Act 1892.

The act increased the number of additional members of the council to a maximum of 20, of whom not more than nine had to be officials. The act introduced the method of election for the council, but did not mention word "election" explicitly. The elected members were officially called as "nominated" members and their method of election was described as "recommendation". Such "recommendations" were made by district boards, universities, municipalities and other associations. The term of the members was fixed at two years. The council could also discuss the annual financial statement and ask questions subject to certain limitations. Thirty eight Indian members were "nominated" in the eight elections during 1893–1909 when this act was in effect. C. Jambulingam Mudaliar, N. Subba Rao Pantulu, P. Kesava Pillai and C. Vijayaraghavachariar representing southern group of district boards, Kruthiventi Perraju Pantulu of the northern group of municipalities, C. Sankaran Nair and P. Rangaiah Naidu from the Corporation of Madras and P. S. Sivaswami Iyer, V. Krishnaswamy Iyer and M. Krishnan Nair from the University of Madras were some of the active members. However, over a period of time, representation by Indian members dwindled, for example, the position of Bashyam Iyengar and Sankaran Nayar in 1902 was occupied by G L Acworth and Sir G. M. J. Moore.

== List of members ==
This is the list of the official and non-official members of the Madras Legislative Council between 1891 and 1909. The number of members in the council at a given point of time may vary due to differing appointment dates of the individual members.

Year	Governor	Officials	Non-officials
1891–1892	Baron Wenlock		
1891–1892	Baron Wenlock	James Charlemagne Dormer	C. Sankaran Nair
1891–1892	Baron Wenlock	H. E. Stokes	Reginald James Hugh Arbuthnot
1891–1892	Baron Wenlock	John Henry Garstin	Mir H. J. Bahadur
1891–1892	Baron Wenlock	J. H. Spring-Branson	Maharaja of Vizianagaram
1891–1892	Baron Wenlock	J. Frederick Price	V. Bhashyam Aiyangar
1892–1893	Bailey Baron Wenlock		
1892–1893	Bailey Baron Wenlock	Charles Mansfield Clarke	Maharaja of Vizianagaram
1892–1893	Bailey Baron Wenlock	John Henry Garstin	V. Bhashyam Aiyangar
1892–1893	Bailey Baron Wenlock	H. W. Bliss	J. A. Boyson
1892–1893	Bailey Baron Wenlock	J. H. Spring-Branson	P. Rangaiah Naidu
1892–1893	Bailey Baron Wenlock	J. Frederick Price	A. Sabhapathi Mudaliar
1892–1893	Bailey Baron Wenlock	G. A. Galton	K. Kalyanasundaramier
1892–1893	Bailey Baron Wenlock	H. F. Clogstoun	N. Subba Rao
1892–1893	Bailey Baron Wenlock	J. Grose	R. Ramasubbier
1892–1893	Bailey Baron Wenlock	W. P. Austin	William Miller
1892–1893	Bailey Baron Wenlock	John Pennycuick	C. Sankaran Nair
1892–1893	Bailey Baron Wenlock	S. Srinivasa Raghavaiyangar	Gulam Mohammad Husain Ali Akbar Khan
1892–1893	Bailey Baron Wenlock	A. Monroe	
1892–1893	Bailey Baron Wenlock	C. S. Crole	
1893–1894	Baron Wenlock		
1893–1894	Baron Wenlock	Charles Mansfield Clerk	V. Bhashyam Aiyangar
1893–1894	Baron Wenlock	Henry William Bliss	P. Rangaiah Naidu
1893–1894	Baron Wenlock	James Grose	A. Sabhapathi Mudaliar
1893–1894	Baron Wenlock	John Pennycuick	M. Kalyanasundaramier
1893–1894	Baron Wenlock	S. Srinivasa Raghavaiyangar	N. S. Rao
1893–1894	Baron Wenlock	C. S. Crole	S. R. Ramasubbier
1893–1894	Baron Wenlock	A. J. Arundel	William Miller
1893–1894	Baron Wenlock	E. Gibson	C. Sankaran Nair
1893–1894	Baron Wenlock	J. H. Spring-Branson	Gulam Mohammad Hasan Ali
1893–1894	Baron Wenlock	J. Sturrock	Maharaja of Vizianagaram
1893–1894	Baron Wenlock	D. Duncan	G. Romilly
1893–1894	Baron Wenlock	J. Frederick Price	Sir Charles George Arbuthnot
1895–1896	Baron Wenlock		
1895–1896	Baron Wenlock	Henry Williams Bliss	Vellore Mohammad Sheriff Khan Bahadur
1895–1896	Baron Wenlock	James Grose	G. Romilly
1895–1896	Baron Wenlock	C. S. Crole	V. Bhashyam Aiyangar
1895–1896	Baron Wenlock	A. T. Arundel	G. L. Chamber
1895–1896	Baron Wenlock	F. Gibson	P. Rangaiah Naidu
1895–1896	Baron Wenlock	J. H. Spring-Branson	W. Miller
1895–1896	Baron Wenlock	J. Sturrock	C. Sankaran Nair
1895–1896	Baron Wenlock	D. Duncan	N. Subba Rao
1895–1896	Baron Wenlock	J. Frederick Price	K. Kalyana Sundaram Iyer
1895–1896	Baron Wenlock	S. Srinivasa Raghavaiyangar	C. Jambulingam Mudaliar
1895–1896	Baron Wenlock		C. Vijayaraghavachariar
1896–1897	Arthur Elibank Havelock		
1896–1897	Arthur Elibank Havelock	Henry Williams Bliss	V. Bhashyam Aiyangar
1896–1897	Arthur Elibank Havelock	James Grose	P. Rangaiah Naidu
1896–1897	Arthur Elibank Havelock	C. S. Crole	W. Miller
1896–1897	Arthur Elibank Havelock	A. T. Arundel	C. Sankaran Nair
1896–1897	Arthur Elibank Havelock	D. McNeil Campbell	N. Subba Rao
1896–1897	Arthur Elibank Havelock	J. H. Spring-Branson	K. Kalyanasundaram Iyer
1896–1897	Arthur Elibank Havelock	J. Sturrock	C. Jambulingam Mudaliar
1896–1897	Arthur Elibank Havelock	D. Duncan	Vellore Mohammad Sheriff
1896–1897	Arthur Elibank Havelock	P. Rajarathna Mudaliar	H. P. Hodgson
1896–1897	Arthur Elibank Havelock	Gabriel Stokes	Raja of Bobbili
1897–1898	Arthur Elibank Havelock		
1897–1898	Arthur Elibank Havelock	Henry Williams Bliss	Vellore Mohammad Sheriff
1897–1898	Arthur Elibank Havelock	James Grose	H. P. Hodgson
1897–1898	Arthur Elibank Havelock	C. S. Crole	Raja of Bobbili
1897–1898	Arthur Elibank Havelock	J. Sturrock	Sir Charles George Arbuthnot
1897–1898	Arthur Elibank Havelock	D. Duncan	P. Rangaiah Naidu
1897–1898	Arthur Elibank Havelock	P. Rajaratna Mudaliar	N. S. Rao
1897–1898	Arthur Elibank Havelock	V. Bhasyam Aiyangar	C. Jambulingam Mudaliar
1897–1898	Arthur Elibank Havelock	A. T. Arundel	C. Vijayaraghavachariar
1897–1898	Arthur Elibank Havelock	G. H. Stuart	P. Ratnasabhapathi Pillai
1897–1898	Arthur Elibank Havelock	H. T. Ross	G. H. Stuart
1898–1899	Arthur Elibank Havelock		
1898–1899	Arthur Elibank Havelock	A. T. Arundel	P. Rangaiah Naidu
1898–1899	Arthur Elibank Havelock	H. M. Winterbotham	N. S. Rao
1898–1899	Arthur Elibank Havelock	G. H. Stuart	C. Jambulingam Mudaliar
1898–1899	Arthur Elibank Havelock	C. A. White	C. Vijayaraghavachariar
1898–1899	Arthur Elibank Havelock	Sturrock	P. Ratna Sabhapathi Pillai
1898–1899	Arthur Elibank Havelock	Gabriel Stokes	S. Shungrasoobyer
1898–1899	Arthur Elibank Havelock	G. S. Forbes	
1898–1899	Arthur Elibank Havelock	J. Thomson	H. B. Hodgson
1898–1899	Arthur Elibank Havelock	D. D. Duncan	V. Bhasyam Aiyangar
1898–1899	Arthur Elibank Havelock	P. Rajarathna Mudaliar	Raja of Bobbili
1898–1899	Arthur Elibank Havelock	W. J. H. Le Fanu	
1899–1900	Arthur Elibank Havelock		
1899–1900	Arthur Elibank Havelock	A. T. Arundel	Gulam Mohammad Sheriff Bahadur
1899–1900	Arthur Elibank Havelock	H. M. Winterbotham	H. P. Hodgson
1899–1900	Arthur Elibank Havelock	Gabriel Stokes	Raja of Bobbili
1899–1900	Arthur Elibank Havelock	G. S. Forbes	G. M. J. Moore
1899–1900	Arthur Elibank Havelock	J. Thomson	C. E. P. Vans Agnew
1899–1900	Arthur Elibank Havelock	P. Rajarathna Mudaliar	Eardley Norton
1899–1900	Arthur Elibank Havelock	F. A. Nicholson	C. Jambulingam Mudaliar
1899–1900	Arthur Elibank Havelock	V. Bhashyam Aiyangar	C. Vijayaraghavachariar
1899–1900	Arthur Elibank Havelock	G. H. Stuart	G. Venkata Ratnam
1899–1900	Arthur Elibank Havelock	J. E. P. Wallis	P. Ratnasabhapathi Pillai
1900–1901	Arthur Elibank Havelock		
1900–1901	Arthur Elibank Havelock	A. T. Arundel	S. Shungrasoobyer
1900–1901	Arthur Elibank Havelock	H. M. Winterbotham	Nawab Mohammad Khan Bahadur
1900–1901	Arthur Elibank Havelock	Gabriel Stokes	G. L. Acworth
1900–1901	Arthur Elibank Havelock	G. S. Forbes	Raja of Bobbili
1900–1901	Arthur Elibank Havelock	J. Thomson	G. M. J. Moore
1900–1901	Arthur Elibank Havelock	P. Rajarathna Mudaliar	Sir Charles George Arbuthnot
1900–1901	Arthur Elibank Havelock	F. A. Nicholson	Eardley Norton
1900–1901	Arthur Elibank Havelock	V. Bhashyam Aiyangar	C. Jambulingam Mudaliar
1900–1901	Arthur Elibank Havelock	G. H. Stuart	C. Vijayaraghavachariar
1900–1901	Arthur Elibank Havelock	J. E. P. Wallis	G. Venkataratnam
1900–1901	Arthur Elibank Havelock	Francis Spring	P. Ratnasabhapathi Pillai
1900–1901	Arthur Elibank Havelock	Le Fanu	
1901–1902	Arthur Oliver Villiers Russell		
1901–1902	Arthur Oliver Villiers Russell	H. M. Winterbotham	W. Miller
1901–1902	Arthur Oliver Villiers Russell	J. Thomson	Eardley Norton
1901–1902	Arthur Oliver Villiers Russell	J. E. P. Wallis	Nawab Syed Mohammad Sahib
1901–1902	Arthur Oliver Villiers Russell	G. S. Forbes	G. L. Acworth
1901–1902	Arthur Oliver Villiers Russell	H. Bradley	Raja of Bobbili
1901–1902	Arthur Oliver Villiers Russell	H. W. B. Higgins	G. M. J. Moore
1901–1902	Arthur Oliver Villiers Russell	H. A. Sim	A. J. Yorke
1901–1902	Arthur Oliver Villiers Russell	W. B. DeWinter	C. Jambulingam Mudaliar
1901–1902	Arthur Oliver Villiers Russell	J. N. Atkinson	P. Ratnasabhapathi Pillai
1901–1902	Arthur Oliver Villiers Russell	S. Srinivasa Raghavaiyangar	G. Srinivasa Rao
1901–1902	Arthur Oliver Villiers Russell	M. Hammick	K. Perraju Pantulu
1901–1902	Arthur Oliver Villiers Russell	G. H. Stuart	
1902–1903	Arthur Oliver Villiers Russell		
1902–1903	Arthur Oliver Villiers Russell	H. M. Winterbotham	Eardley Norton
1902–1903	Arthur Oliver Villiers Russell	James Thomson	G. Srinivasa Rao
1902–1903	Arthur Oliver Villiers Russell	H. A. Sim	K. Perraju Pantulu
1902–1903	Arthur Oliver Villiers Russell	J. N. Atkinson	P. R. S. Pillai
1902–1903	Arthur Oliver Villiers Russell	G. H. Stuart	Nawab Sayed Mohammad Sahib
1902–1903	Arthur Oliver Villiers Russell	A. W. Smart	G. L. Acworth
1902–1903	Arthur Oliver Villiers Russell	J. E. P. Wallis	Raja of Bobbili
1902–1903	Arthur Oliver Villiers Russell	F. A. Nicholson	C. M. J. Moore
1902–1903	Arthur Oliver Villiers Russell	G. S. Forbes	Sir Charles George Arbuthnot
1902–1903	Arthur Oliver Villiers Russell	Gabriel Stokes	L. A. Govindaraghava Aiyar
1902–1903	Arthur Oliver Villiers Russell	H. Bradley	
1902–1903	Arthur Oliver Villiers Russell	R. V. Srinivasa Aiyar	
1903–1904	Arthur Oliver Villiers Russell		
1903–1904	Arthur Oliver Villiers Russell	James Thomason	Nawab Sayid Mohammad Sahib
1903–1904	Arthur Oliver Villiers Russell	Gabriel Stokes	G. L. Acworth
1903–1904	Arthur Oliver Villiers Russell	G. S. Forbes	Raja of Bobbili
1903–1904	Arthur Oliver Villiers Russell	J. E. P. Wallis	L. A. Govindaraghava Aiyar
1903–1904	Arthur Oliver Villiers Russell	J. B. Bilderbeck	C. Sankaran Nair
1903–1904	Arthur Oliver Villiers Russell	M. Hammick	K. Vasudeva Aiyangar
1903–1904	Arthur Oliver Villiers Russell	C. J. weir	H. Scott
1903–1904	Arthur Oliver Villiers Russell	H. A. Sim	R. V. Prakasha Mudaliar
1903–1904	Arthur Oliver Villiers Russell	A. E. Castle Stuart Stuart	G. Srinivasa Rao
1903–1904	Arthur Oliver Villiers Russell	J. Twig	M. Krishnan Nair
1903–1904	Arthur Oliver Villiers Russell	R. V. Srinivasa Iyer	
1903–1904	Arthur Oliver Villiers Russell	J. N. Atkinson	
1903–1904	Arthur Oliver Villiers Russell	A. G. Bourke	
1904–1905	Arthur Oliver Villiers Russell		
1904–1905	Arthur Oliver Villiers Russell	James Thomson	L. A. Govindaraghava Iyer
1904–1905	Arthur Oliver Villiers Russell	Gabriel Stokes	K. Vasudeva Aiyangar
1904–1905	Arthur Oliver Villiers Russell	C. J. Weir	G. Srinivasa Rao
1904–1905	Arthur Oliver Villiers Russell	R. V. Srinivasa Iyer	M. Krishnan Nair
1904–1905	Arthur Oliver Villiers Russell	J. N. Atkinson	K. Venkata Rao
1904–1905	Arthur Oliver Villiers Russell	A. G. Bourne	Sir Charles George Arbuthnot
1904–1905	Arthur Oliver Villiers Russell	H. Bradley	Ghulam Muhammad Ali Khan
1904–1905	Arthur Oliver Villiers Russell	A. E. Castle Stuart	H. P. Hodgson
1904–1905	Arthur Oliver Villiers Russell	J. E. P. Wallis	C. Muttukumaraswami Mudaliyar
1904–1905	Arthur Oliver Villiers Russell	J. Twigg	P. S. Sivaswami Iyer
1904–1905	Arthur Oliver Villiers Russell		V. C. Desikachariar
1905–1906	Arthur Oliver Villiers Russell		
1905–1906	Arthur Oliver Villiers Russell	Gabriel Stokes	L. A. Govindaraghava Iyer
1905–1906	Arthur Oliver Villiers Russell	G. S. Forbes	K. Vasudeva Aiyangar
1905–1906	Arthur Oliver Villiers Russell	C. J. Weir	M. Krishnan Nair
1905–1906	Arthur Oliver Villiers Russell	R. V. Srinivasa Iyer	Ghulam Muhammad Ali Khan
1905–1906	Arthur Oliver Villiers Russell	J. N. Atkinson	H. P. Hodgson
1905–1906	Arthur Oliver Villiers Russell	A. G. Bourne	C. Muttukumarasami Mudaliyar
1905–1906	Arthur Oliver Villiers Russell	H. Bradley	P. S. Sivasami Iyer
1905–1906	Arthur Oliver Villiers Russell	A. E. Castle Stuart Stuart	V. C. Desikachariar
1905–1906	Arthur Oliver Villiers Russell	J. E. P. Wallis	A. J. Yorke
1905–1906	Arthur Oliver Villiers Russell	J. Twigg	K. R. Guruswami Iyer
1905–1906	Arthur Oliver Villiers Russell	M. Hammick	
1905–1906	Arthur Oliver Villiers Russell	Alexander Gordon Cardew	
1906–1907	Arthur Lawley		
1906–1907	Arthur Lawley	G. S. Forbes	L. A. Govindaraghava Iyer
1906–1907	Arthur Lawley	M. Hammick	M. Krishnan Nair
1906–1907	Arthur Lawley	C. J. weir	H. P. Hodgson
1906–1907	Arthur Lawley	R. V. Srinivasa Iyer	C. Muttukumarasami Mudaliyar
1906–1907	Arthur Lawley	J. N. Atkinson	P. S. Sivaswami Iyer
1906–1907	Arthur Lawley	A. E. Castle Stuart Stuart	V. C. Desikachariar
1906–1907	Arthur Lawley	J. Twigg	K. R. Guruswami Iyer
1906–1907	Arthur Lawley	H. Bradley	B. Narasimheswara Sarma
1906–1907	Arthur Lawley	A. G. Cardew	Nawab Mohammad Raza Khan
1906–1907	Arthur Lawley	V. Bhashyam Aiyangar	Raja Vasudva Raja Valia Nambidi of Kollengode
1906–1907	Arthur Lawley	T. T. Logan	V. G. Lynn
1906–1907	Arthur Lawley	P. J. Wilson	
1907–1908	Arthur Lawley		
1907–1908	Arthur Lawley	Gabriel Stokes	K. R. Guruswami Iyer
1907–1908	Arthur Lawley	G. S. Forbes	M. Krishnan Nair
1907–1908	Arthur Lawley	J. N. Atkinson	B. Narasimheswara Sharma
1907–1908	Arthur Lawley	R. V. Srinivasa Iyer	Nawab Mohammad Raja Khan
1907–1908	Arthur Lawley	A. G. Cardew	H. P. Hodgson
1907–1908	Arthur Lawley	P. J. Wilson	Raja of Kollengode
1907–1908	Arthur Lawley	J. Twigg	V. G. Lynn
1907–1908	Arthur Lawley	H. Bradley	V. C. Desikachariar
1907–1908	Arthur Lawley	J. Andrew	The Zamindar of Kurupam
1907–1908	Arthur Lawley	C. J. weir	C. K. Srinivasa Rao
1907–1908	Arthur Lawley	A. G. Bourne	
1907–1908	Arthur Lawley	P. S. Sivasami Iyer	
1908–1909	Arthur Lawley		
1908–1909	Arthur Lawley	George Stuart Forbes	The Zamindar of Kurupam
1908–1909	Arthur Lawley	M. Hammick	V. Krishnaswami Iyer
1908–1909	Arthur Lawley	A. G. Bourne	K. R. Guruswami Iyer
1908–1909	Arthur Lawley	C. J. Weir	M. Krishnan Nair
1908–1909	Arthur Lawley	R. V. Srinivasa Iyer	B. Narasimheswara Sharma
1908–1909	Arthur Lawley	P. S. Sivaswami Iyer	Nawab Mohammad Raza Khan
1908–1909	Arthur Lawley	W. O. Horne	C. E. Abbot
1908–1909	Arthur Lawley	P. J. Wilson	A. J. Yorke
1908–1909	Arthur Lawley	R. B. Clegg	Raja of Kollengode
1908–1909	Arthur Lawley	J. Twigg	P. Thyagaraya Chetty
1908–1909	Arthur Lawley		P. Kesava Pillai

== See also ==
- Madras Legislative Council, 1861-1891
