= Raghunath Narasinha Mudholkar =

Indian politician

Rao Bahadur R. N. Mudholkar CIE
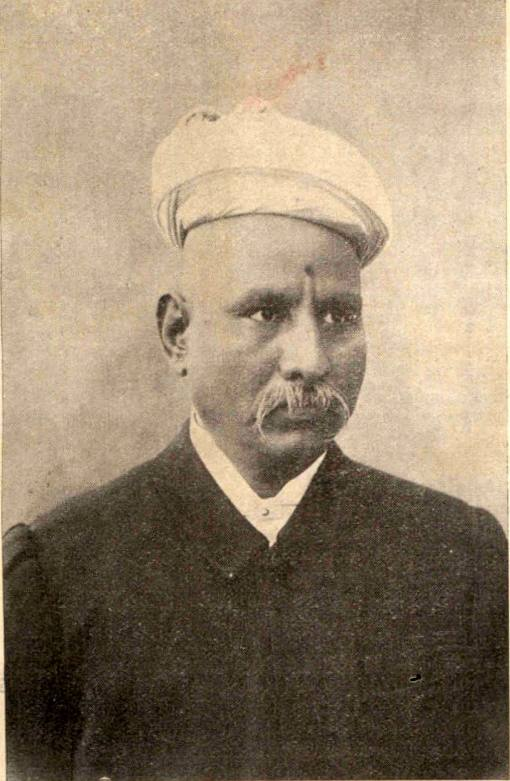

President of the Indian National Congress
- In office December 1912 – December 1913
- Preceded by: Bishan Narayan Dar
- Succeeded by: Nawab Syed Muhammad Bahadur

Personal details
- Born: Raghunath Narsinha Mudholkar; 16 May 1857 Dhule, British India
- Died: 13 January 1921 (aged 64)
- Party: Indian National Congress
- Children: Janardan Raghunath Mudholkar (son)
- Education: Elphinstone College
- Occupation: Politician
- Awards: Order of the Indian Empire (1914); Rao Bahadur

Rao Bahadur Raghunath Narasinha Mudholkar CIE (16 May 1857 – 13 January 1921), was an Indian politician who served as the President of the Indian National Congress for one term, succeeding Pandit Bishan Narayan Dar. He presided over 27th session of Indian National Congress at Bankipore (Patna) in 1912.

Raghunath Mudholkar was born in Dhule, Khandesh, in a respectable middle-class Deshastha Brahmin family on 16 May 1857. He had his education partly at Dhulia and partly in Vidarbha. Then he went to Bombay and graduated from Elphinstone College where he was granted a Fellowship. He was leading Lawyer practising at Amravati along with G. S. Khaparde and Moropant V Joshi. He was invested as a Companion of the Order of the Indian Empire in January 1914, in recognition of his public services.

He was a devout Hindu, advocated social reforms like female education, widow remarriage and removal of Untouchability. As a follower of Gokhale, he believed that developing nationalism required British cooperation and therefore the national movement should be constitutional and nonviolent. He was in the Congress from 1888 to 1917, and thereafter joined the Liberals. He was in the Congress delegation of 1890 sent to England to voice the grievances of the Indians. He was President of the Indian National Congress held at Bankipur in 1912.

He admired Parliamentary democracy but opposed British bureaucracy. He criticised the economic policy of the Government, helped to establish a number of industries in Vidarbha and advocated technical education. He founded several social organisations and worked for the uplift of the poor. He died on 13 January 1921.

His son Janardhan became Judge at the Supreme Court of India during 1960–1966.
