= 2022 Indian National Congress leadership election =

Internal party poll to elect new party president

- 17 October 2022
- Turnout: 95.78%
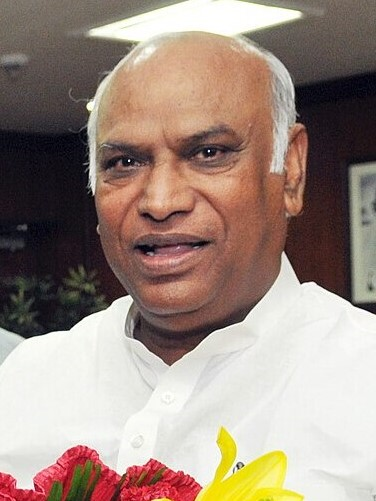

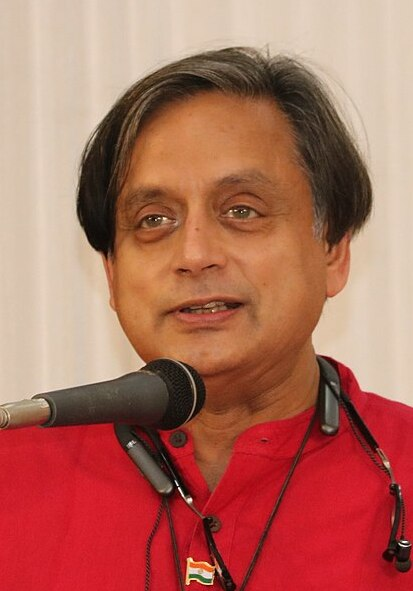
Candidate	Mallikarjun Kharge	Shashi Tharoor
Percentage	84.14%	11.42%
President before election
Sonia Gandhi (interim)
Elected President
Mallikarjun Kharge

The 2022 Indian National Congress leadership election was an internal party election that was held to elect the next president of the Indian National Congress. A formal notification for the election was issued on 22 September 2022. The election was held on 17 October 2022 and counting of votes took place on 19 October 2022. Mallikarjun Kharge won the election amassing 7,897 votes compared to 1,072 of Shashi Tharoor.

The election was triggered by resignation of Rahul Gandhi as party leader on 10 August 2019. However, the party's presidium, the All India Congress Committee, elected former president Sonia Gandhi as interim president. Due to the COVID-19 pandemic, the election for the next president was postponed until 2022. The election was administered by the party's Central Election Authority headed by Madhusudan Mistry.

== Background ==
Rahul Gandhi was unanimously elected as president in 2017. However, following the party's poor performance in the 2019 Indian general election, Gandhi resigned. Sonia Gandhi was selected by the party's presidium as the interim president. Sonia Gandhi is Rahul Gandhi's mother, and was the party's longest serving president from 1998 to 2017. There was also election held in 1997, Sitaram Kesari defeated Sharad Pawar.

It was reported by news outlets that Rahul Gandhi was not likely to contest the election. It was confirmed by Congress spokesperson Jairam Ramesh that Rahul Gandhi would not file nomination for the election. Rahul Gandhi told Ashok Gehlot that no member of the Gandhi family should be the next President.

=== Prior elections ===
The last party leadership election was held in 2017, which Rahul Gandhi won unanimously. The last contested election was held in 2000, when Sonia Gandhi defeated Jitendra Prasada by a huge margin of 97%. She had been repeatedly selected for the position without any election being held.

=== Nomination ===
On 19 September 2022, it was reported that Shashi Tharoor and Ashok Gehlot were interested in running for the post. Both Tharoor and Ashok officially confirmed on 24 September that they would be running for the post. Gehlot and Tharoor confirmed they would file their nominations in the coming days. During the same day Sonia Gandhi met Anand Sharma a prominent leader of the G-23 on the discussion of the post and Himachal Pradesh Election. In the following days various reports emerged that Digvijaya Singh was looking to compete for the post and has started collecting signatures from party members for his nominations. During the process for nominations, multiple Congress MPs flew to Delhi to support various candidates. On 29 September, Digvijaya Singh officially announced he would be contesting for the post and that he would file his papers on 30 September.

Post Gehlot announcing his intentions to run for the post, multiple MLA in Rajasthan expressed dissatisfaction. Concerns over the government power in Rajasthan grew within the party, with pro-Gehlot MLAs planning on submitting resignations if Sachin Pilot were to become the CM. On 29 September, Gehlot met with Congress president Sonia Gandhi for an hour long meeting, post meeting Gehlot confirmed he will no longer be contesting for the post. Later reports emerged that former Jharkhand MLA, K. N. Tripathi was looking to enter the race which was confirmed few hours later.

On 30 September, Shashi Tharoor and K. N. Tripathi officially filed their nomination for the post while Digvijaya Singh pulled out on the last minute. After various meetings from 28 to 30 September, several senior leaders decided to support Mallikarjun Kharge for the post. Singh and Gehlot who pulled out from the contest earlier announced they will be extending their support to Kharge, whereas Tripathi's nomination was rejected by the AICC Central Election Authority.

== Schedule ==
The election schedule was announced by the Congress Working Committee on 28 August 2022.

Event	Schedule
Date of Notification	22 September 2022
Date for Nominations	24 September 2022
Last Date for filing Nominations	30 September 2022
Date for scrutiny of nominations	1 October 2022
Last date for withdrawal of candidatures	8 October 2022
Date of poll	17 October 2022
Date of counting	19 October 2022

== Candidates ==
=== Nominated ===
Candidate	Political office	Campaign announced (Nomination filed)	Ref
Dr Shashi Tharoor	Member of Parliament, Lok Sabha from Thiruvananthapuram (2009–present)	24 September 2022 (30 September 2022)	
Adv. Mallikarjun Kharge	Leader of the Opposition in Rajya Sabha (2021–present); Member of Parliament, Rajya Sabha from Karnataka (2020–present)	30 September 2022 (30 September 2022)	

=== Rejected ===
Candidate	Political office	Campaign announced (Nomination filed)	Nomination rejected	Ref
Krishna Nand Tripathi	Member of Legislative Assembly, Jharkhand from Daltonganj (2009–2014)	29 September 2022 (30 September 2022)	1 October 2022	

=== Withdrew ===
Candidate	Political office	Campaign announced	Campaign suspended	Ref
Ashok Gehlot	Chief Minister of Rajasthan (1998–2003, 2008–2013, 2018–2023); Member of Legislative Assembly, Rajasthan from Sardarpura (1998–present)	23 September 2022	29 September 2022	
Digvijaya Singh	Member of Parliament, Rajya Sabha from Madhya Pradesh (2014–present)	29 September 2022	30 September 2022	

=== Declined ===
- Sonia Gandhi, President of the Indian National Congress (1998–2017, 2019–October 2022), Member of Parliament, Lok Sabha from Amethi (1999–2004), Rae Bareli (2004–2024), Member of Parliament, Rajya Sabha (2024–present)
- Rahul Gandhi, President of the Indian National Congress (2017–2019), Member of Parliament, Lok Sabha from Amethi (2004–2019), Wayanad (2019–2024), from Rae Bareli (2024–present)

== Incidents ==
On the day of counting, Tharoor's team alleged electoral fraud and said that there were "extremely serious irregularities" in Uttar Pradesh Congress Committee. They also cited serious issues with polls in Punjab and Telangana. Tharoor's chief election agent, Salman Soz further alleged that poll agents were threatened when reporting cases of voter malpractice.

After the allegations were leaked to the media, the Tharoor camp softened their stance and met with Madhusudan Mistry, the Congress central election authority chairman. After the meeting, Soz was assured of a proper probe and the issue was dismissed by Mistry as a "general complaint" whose accusations were not specific.

== Results ==
The results were announced on 19 October 2022.

Candidate	PCC Delegates' vote	
Candidate	Votes	%
Mallikarjun Kharge	7,897	84.14%
Shashi Tharoor	1,072	11.42%
Invalid votes	416	4.43%
Votes counted	9,385	

== See also ==
- List of presidents of the Indian National Congress
