= S. A. Saminatha Iyer =

Indian lawyer, landlord, politician and theosophist

- Died: 1899; Kumbakonam
- Occupation: lawyer
- Title: Rao Bahadur
- Political party: Indian National Congress

Rao Bahadur S. A. Saminatha Iyer (died 1899), also known as Thanjavur Saminatha Iyer, was an Indian lawyer, landlord, politician and theosophist who served as Chairman of the Tanjore municipality and a delegate to the 1885, 1886, 1887, 1889 and 1894 sessions of the Indian National Congress. He spoke against salt tax in the first session conducted in 1885 and in 1887, was a part of a 32-member team that wrote the constitution of the Congress. Christopher Baker and D. A. Washbrook describe him as the "most celebrated spokesman of the Tanjore gentry".

== Early life ==
S. A. Swaminatha Iyer was born in the Tanjore district of Tamil Nadu. He was the eldest of four sons of Sankaranarayana Dikshitar, the others being S. A. Subramania Iyer, S. A. Ayyaswami Iyer and S. A. Ananthanarayana Iyer. On completion of his education, Saminatha Iyer practised as a pleader in Negapatam. Around 1887, Saminatha Iyer migrated to Tanjore where he served as Public Prosecutor at the Tanjore district court.

== Politics ==
Saminatha Iyer took an interest in politics during his practise as a pleader in Negapatam. During the early 1880s, he was elected to the Negapatam municipality and served as a member. In 1882, Saminatha Iyer took the lead in organizing the Madras Native Association branch in the district. He also set up a Negapatam branch of the Theosophical Society in 1883 and served as its Secretary. When the Madras Mahajana Sabha was formed in 1884, Saminatha Iyer became a corresponding member.

In September 1885, Saminatha Iyer moved to Kumbakonam and succeeded Sir A. Seshayya Sastri as President of the Tanjore People's Association. He was the association's sole delegate to the first session of the Indian National Congress held in Bombay between 25 and 28 December 1885. Saminatha Iyer was subsequently made a "Rao Sahib".

At the session, Saminatha Iyer vehemently criticized the Salt Tax

It would be unjust and unrighteous if the tax on salt should be increased. It is a necessary article both for human as well as animal well-being... it would be bad policy and a retrograde movement to raise the tax, especially at a time when the poor millions of India are anxiously looking forward for a further reduction of the tax.... As any increase, therefore, of this tax will fall heavily upon the masses of the people of the land, I would strongly urge upon the attention of this Congress the necessity of its entering its strong protest against any attempt on the part of Government to raise the tax on salt

During the third session of the Indian National Congress held at Madras in 1887, S. A. Swaminatha Iyer was appointed member of the 35-member committee which framed the constitution of the Indian National Congress. He also participated in the 1886, 1889 and 1894 sessions, in the last along with his younger brother, S. A. Anantanarayanan, a High Court vakil.

In April 1888, serious disturbances broke out in the Madras Presidency when there were rumours that a Brahmin student in the Madras Christian College had expressed willingness to embrace Christianity In June 1888, Brahmin students in the town of Nannilam in Tanjore district began to agitate for the missionary school in the town to be shut down. A meeting was held in the district and presided over by Swaminatha Iyer in which he gave a brief description of the Indian National Congress and exhorted the people to boycott the Christian school and instead start a national school for the education of children. Swaminatha Iyer criticised the liberal spendings of the faculty of the missionary colleges while the people of the Presidency suffered from poverty. The Christian school, eventually, became empty of students, a month before the inspection by the Madras government, thereby depriving it of a government grant of Rs. 200. Swaminatha Iyer prepared a list of prices of food items to illustrate the comparative poverty of the masses with regard to the affluent lifestyle of the missionaries. This was later supplied as evidence by Rev. Henry Simpson Lunn during the hearing of the Madras Christian College controversies.

Saminatha Iyer was elected to the District Board of Tanjore in 1886 and nominated Chairman of the Tanjore municipal council in 1887. The same year he was made a "Rao Bahadur". As Chairman, Saminatha Iyer presided over the golden jubilee celebrations of the reign of Queen Victoria in Tanjore city. He was also elected Secretary of the Rajah Mirasdar Hospital, Tanjore. In 1892, he became the President of the Tanjore branch of the Theosophical Society. In 1893, Saminatha Iyer was succeeded as Chairman of the Tanjore municipal council by K. Kalyanasundaramier.

In 1892, when the mirasidars of Thanjavur district agitated against the rise of the land revenue from rupees 3.9 million to 5.6 million as per the newly introduced scientific settlement, Swaminatha Iyer led the movement. Saminatha Iyer unsuccessfully stood for election to the Madras Legislative Council for the Municipalities seat.

== Temple politics ==
Swaminatha Iyer showed an active interest in the administrative affairs of Hindu temples right from the time of his election to the Kumbakonam Temple Committee, which administered Hindu temples in the Kumbakonam division of Tanjore district comprising the taluks of Kumbakonam, Mayavaram and Shiyali. Iyer was a member of the committee from 1885 till his death in 1899.

== Death ==
Swaminatha Iyer died on 12 August 1899.

== Family ==
Saminatha Iyer did not have natural offspring of his own. He adopted S. A. Venkatarama Iyer (1894–1961). His granddaughter is the noted ethnomusicologist, S. A. K. Durga.
