= Governor Hobart =

Governor Hobart may refer to:

- Robert Hobart, 4th Earl of Buckinghamshire (1760–1816), Governor of Madras from 1793 to 1798
- Vere Hobart, Lord Hobart (1818–1875), Governor of Madras from 1872 to 1875
