= G23 =

G23 may refer to:

- G-23 (political group), a group of 23 Indian members of parliament
- Glock 23, an Austrian handgun
- Gribovsky G-23, a Soviet experimental aircraft
- Grumman G-23, an American biplane
- HMS Mahratta (G23), an M-class destroyer of the Royal Navy
- Junkers G 23, a German monoplane
- Shambala language, a Bantu language of Tanzania
- BMW G23, a convertible version of the BMW 4 Series (G22)
- HMS Dagger (G23), a Royal Navy Weapon-class destroyer scrapped prior to completion
- G-23, an alternative name for the G20 developing nations
- G23, type of Bi-pin lamp base
