= Rajagopala Krishna Yachendra =

Indian nobleman and politician

V. Rajagopala Krishna Yachendra
- Maharaja Sahib Mushfiq Meherban Karamfarmage Mukhsari Umdu-i-Raja Rajah Bhadur, Maharaja of Venkatagiri
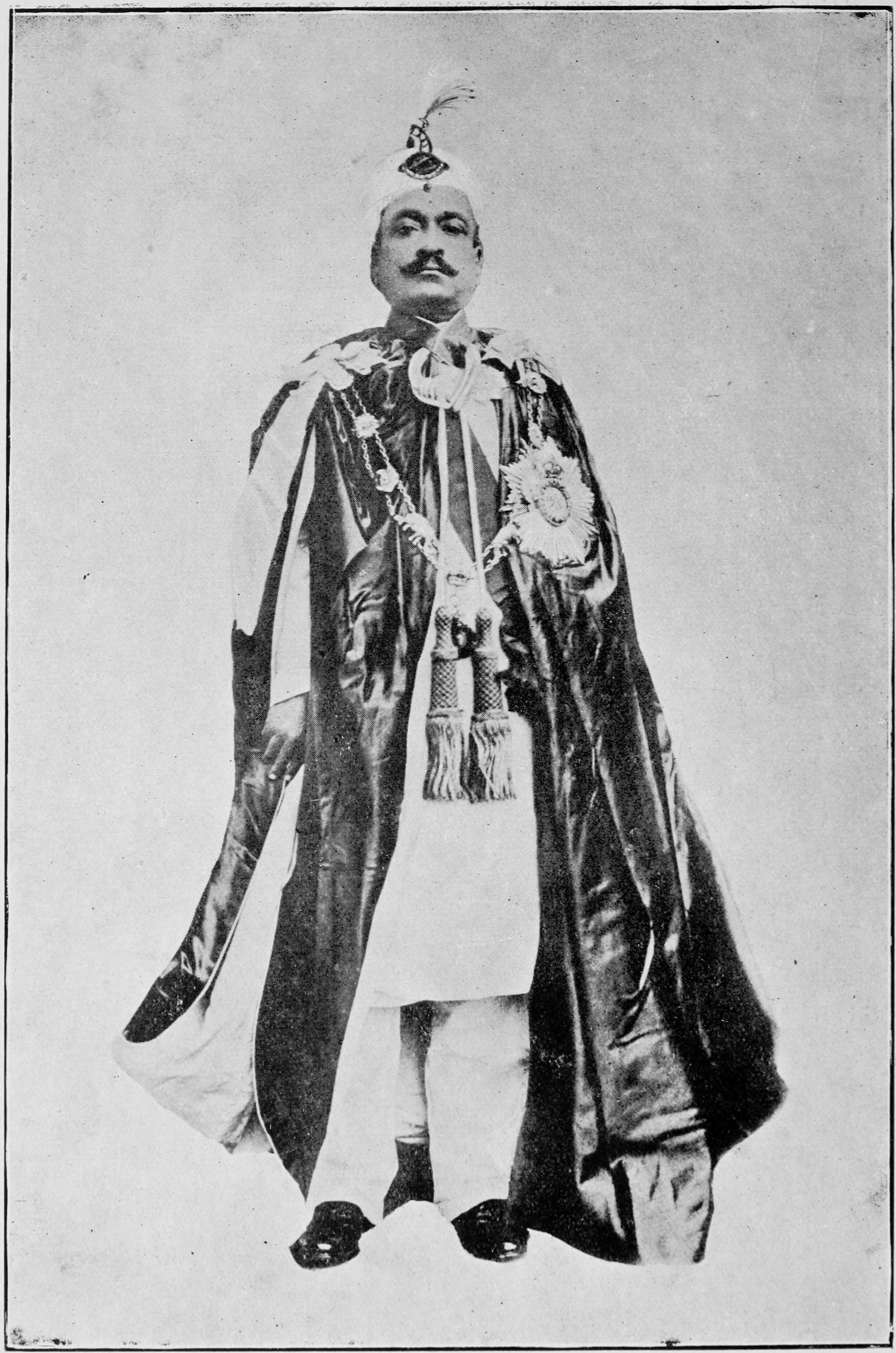
- Sir V. Rajagopala Krishna Yachendra, 28th generation.
- Reign: 1879 to 1916
- Coronation: 3 March 1879
- Predecessor: Velugoti SARVAGNA KUMARA YACHENDRA
- Successor: Velugoti Govinda Krishna Yachendra
- Born: 25 November 1857
- Died: 23 July 1916 (aged 58)
- Issue: Maharajah Sahib Velugoti Govinda Krishna Yachendra Bahadur
- Dynasty: Velugoti
- Father: Maharaja Sahib Velugoti SARVAGNA KUMARA YACHENDRA Bahadur
- Religion: Hinduism

Maharaja Sir Rajagopala Krishna Yachendra GCIE CSI, Kaiser-i-Hind (1857–1916) was an Indian nobleman and politician. He was the 28th Maharaja of Venkatagiri from 1878 to 1916, and a member of the Legislative Council of Madras from 1887 . He belonged to the royal Velugoti Dynasty of the Padmanayaka Velamas. He is known to have reformed and encouraged education during his tenure as M.L.C and even as the Maharajah of Venkatagiri .

Rajagopala was a non-official member of Madras Legislative Council. He served in the Council starting from 1887. His brother's grandson is Ramakrishna Ranga Rao became the Chief Minister of Madras Presidency after dyarchy was established. One of his grandson who was adopted by the Maharani of Kolanka, later became Maharaja of Kolanka and got the Kolanka Cup made.

== Honours ==
Rajagopala Yachendra was made a Knight Commander of the Order of the Indian Empire (KCIE) in May 1888 and subsequently promoted to a Knight Grand Commander (GCIE) in the 1915 New Year Honours List. He was awarded the Kaiser-i-Hind Medal in 1900. He also received the Delhi Durbar Medal .
