= Edmund Webster =

Edmund Webster may refer to:

- Edmund A. Webster, Secretary of State of Alabama
- Edmund Foster Webster, British civil servant of the Indian Civil Service
