= Janardan Raghunath Mudholkar =

Indian Supreme Court jurist

Justice Janardan Raghunath Mudholkar

1st Chairman of Press Council of India
- In office 4 July 1966 – 1 March 1968
- Appointed by: Central Government of India
- Preceded by: Position established
- Succeeded by: N. Rajagopala Ayyangar

Judge of Supreme Court of India
- In office 3 October 1960 – 3 July 1966
- Nominated by: B. P. Sinha
- Appointed by: Rajendra Prasad

Judge of Bombay High Court
- In office 1 November 1956 – 2 October 1960
- Appointed by: Rajendra Prasad

Judge of Nagpur High Court
- In office 11 November 1948 – 31 October 1956
- Appointed by: C. Rajagopalachari

Acting Judge of Nagpur High Court
- In office 21 June 1948 – 5 October 1948
- Appointed by: C. Rajagopalachari

Personal details
- Born: 9 May 1902 Pune
- Died: 27 July 1983 (aged 81) Bhopal, Madhya Pradesh
- Parent: Raghunath Narasinha Mudholkar (father)
- Education: B.A. and LL.B
- Alma mater: Elphinstone College, Sidney Sussex College

Janardan Raghunath Mudholkar B.A., LL.B. (Cantab) Bar-at-Law (9 May 1902 – 27 July 1983), was an Indian judge who served on the Supreme Court of India from 3 October 1960 to 3 July 1966 and also served as first chairman of Press Council of India.

== Education ==
Mudholkar was educated at Elphinstone High School, Bombay; Elphinstone College, Bombay; Sidney Sussex College, Cambridge, Lincoln’s Inn, London. He practised at the Bar at Amravati during 1925–1929 and at Nagpur during 1930-1941. He was the son of Rao Bahadur Raghunath Narasinha Mudholkar, a distinguished lawyer and President of the Indian National Congress at the 1912 session in Bankipur. He became District & Sessions Judge during September 1941 – June 1948.

== Career ==
He became High Court Acting Judge at Nagpur High Court on 21 June 1948 and served till 5 October 1948. He was appointed as additional judge of the same High Court on 11 November 1948 and became permanent on 21 October 1949. He went to the Bombay High Court as Judge on 1 November 1956 due to state reorganisation and creation of new Madhya Pradesh High Court. He served in Bombay High Court till September 1960 and was acting Chief Justice of the Bombay High Court during August–September 1960.

He was amongst the first Indian Supreme Court justices to proclaim the notion that later became known as the Basic Structure of the Indian Constitution. In his separate concurring judgment agreeing with the majority to dismiss the petition of Sajjan Singh v. State of Rajasthan, Mudholkar averred, somewhat hesitatingly, that constitution had certain "basic features" that cannot be amended by Parliament through its amending powers under Article 368:

Before I part with this case I wish to make it clear that what I have said in this judgment is not an expression of my final opinion but only an expression of certain doubts which have assailed me regarding a question of paramount importance to the citizens of our country: to know whether the basic features of the Constitution under which we live and to which we owe allegiance are to endure for all time -or at least for the foreseeable future - or whether the yard no more enduring than the implemental and subordinate provisions of the Constitution.

After his retirement, Mudholkar served as a Special Judge inquiring into allegations of corruption against several Orissa politicians, including then Chief Minister R. N. Singhdeo and former Chief Minister Hare Krushna Mahatab. Dr. Mahtab, represented by Siddhartha Shankar Ray, sued to quash Mudholkar's recommendations in the Orissa High Court. In Dr. Harekrushna Mahtab vs The Chief Minister of Orissa and Others', Chief Justice G Mishra ruled against Mahatab, stating in his order, "...The criticism that the conclusions of Sri Mudholkar were such as could not be reached by any reasonable man is unfounded. ...The State Government fully acted within jurisdiction in getting the alienations verified by Sri Mudholkar, even though earlier it had the satisfaction that there was no prima facie case."
