= Mir Humayun Jah Bahadur =

Indian politician

Mir Humayun Jah Bahadur CIE was an Indian nobleman, politician, theosophist and Indian independence activist who served as a non-official member of Madras Legislative Council from 1866 till 1892 and a non-official member of the Imperial Legislative Council from 1893. He was made a Companion of the Order of the Indian Empire on January 1, 1880, in the Queen's New Year Honours List.

His son, Nawab Syed Muhammad Bahadur served as President of the Indian National Congress in Karachi in 1913.
