= Robert Orr Campbell =

Scottish businessman in Madras (1815–1892)

Robert Orr Campbell (1815–1892) was a Scottish businessman in Madras.

He was the son of Alexander Campbell of Barnhill and his wife Fanny, daughter of Robert Orr. He served as a non-official member of the Madras Legislative Council from 1861 to 1865. He was a partner in the British firm of Binny and Co. and served as the President of the Madras Chamber of Commerce and Industry from 1854 to 1856.

Campbell became chairman of the National Bank of India. He died at Kempston, Bedfordshire, England.
