= L. D. Swamikannu Pillai =

Indian politician, historian, linguist, astronomer and administrator

Lewis Dominic Swamikannu Pillai CIE, ISO
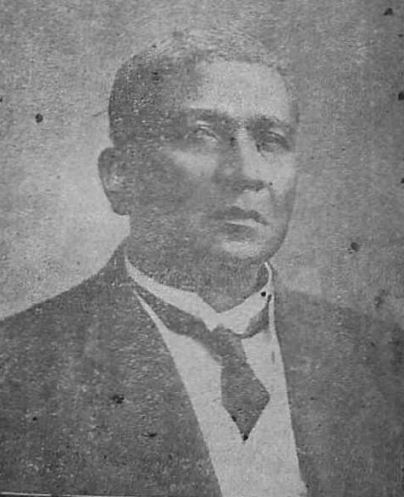

President of the Madras Legislative Council
- In office February 1925 – 10 September 1925
- Governor: George Goschen, 2nd Viscount Goschen
- Preceded by: P. Rajagopalachari
- Succeeded by: V. S. Narasimha Raju

Chief Secretary of the Madras Presidency
- In office 1920–1925
- Succeeded by: G. T. Boag

Personal details
- Born: 11 February 1865 Madras
- Died: 10 September 1925 (aged 60) Royapuram, Madras
- Profession: Politician, astronomer, linguist, philosopher

Diwan Bahadur Lewis Dominic Swamikannu Pillai CIE, ISO (b. 11 February 1865 - d. 10 September 1925) was an Indian politician, historian, linguist, astronomer and administrator who served as the second President of the Madras Legislative Council.

== Life ==
Swamikannu Pillai was born in a poor Indian Christian family of Madras Presidency on 11 February 1865. He had his schooling in Madras and graduated in law before doing his LlB.

When then-President of the Madras Legislative Council, P. Rajagopalachari resigned his post in 1924 to join the India Council, elections were held for the post of President. In February 1925, Swamikannu Pillai took charge as the first elected President of the Madras Legislative Council. During his tenure as President of the Madras Legislative Council, Pillai created the Legislative Council library.

In his honour, the LD Swamikannu Pillai Endowment Lectures in philosophy were later established at the University of Madras.

== Death ==
Swamikannu Pillai died on 10 September 1925 at his home in Royapuram, aged 60.

== Honours ==
Swamikannu Pillai was made a "Diwan Bahadur", appointed a Companion of the Imperial Service Order in 1917 and later appointed a Companion of the Order of the Indian Empire in the 1924 New Year Honours' List.

== Works ==
- L. D. Swamikannu Pillai. Panchang and Horoscope.
- L. D. Swamikannu Pillai. An Indian ephemeris, A. D. 1800 to A. D. 2000.
- Indian Chronology. 1911.
