= Robert Stanton Ellis =

Robert Stanton Ellis, CB (also spelled Staunton; 6 March 1825 (Note: The Charterhouse Register lists his date as 7 March 1825.) – 9 October 1877) was a British civil servant of the Indian civil service who served as a member of the Madras Legislative Council.

== Early life and education ==
Ellis was born in 1825 in the United Kingdom. On clearing the civil service examinations, Ellis moved to Madras in 1844. Ellis was put in the police department and served as Deputy Commissioner of Nagpur and Superintendent of Police during the Indian Rebellion. He served as Chief Secretary to the Madras government from 1870 to 1872 when he was nominated to the Madras Legislative Council. He served as a member of the Madras Legislative Council from 1872 to 1877, when he retired. He was then a member of the Council of India until his death on 9 October 1877.
