= J. G. Coleman =

James George Coleman (1824–1883) was an Anglo-Indian soldier, businessman and philanthropist who served as a member of the Madras Legislative Council from 1879 to 1883.

== Career ==
Coleman was born in 1824 in India and was initially in the Marine Service. Later, he partnered Dr Angus McDowell, founder of McDowell & Co in Madras and eventually rose to become the sole proprietor of the business.

== Public life ==
Coleman was involved in philanthropic activities right from the beginning and strove to uplift the Anglo-Indian community. He joined the Volunteer Movement and rose to become Lieutenant-Colonel in the Duke's Own Artillery Corps. He was also a member of the Madras Municipal Corporation. In 1879, he was nominated to the Madras Legislative Council and served from 1879 to 1883.

== Death ==
Coleman died at Royapuram, Madras on 14 December 1883.
