= K. Kalyanasundaramier =

Indian politician

K. Kalyanasundaramier (also spelt Kalyanasundaram Iyer) was a leading advocate, philanthropist and Indian politician from Tanjore who served as a member of the Madras Legislative Council from the Municipalities seat from 1892 to 1897.

== Early life ==
He was born somewhere in the 1840s. He lost his father at a very young age and was brought up by his mother, Alamelu, in his native village of Kathiramangalam. It is believed his initial K. stands for his native village.

Through sheer hard work he ended up completing law studies and, though a late entrant to the law practice, went on to become a leading advocate in Tanjore becoming not only successful and wealthy but also a well-respected nobleman in that region, especially in Tanjore and in the villages of Kathiramangalam and Nannilam.

In 1891, he donated land in Tanjore for a new school, which was subsequently named after him, the Kalyanasundaram Higher Secondary School (KHSS) which is still in operation. He was an admirer and good friend of Dr. U. V. Swaminatha Iyer; Dr. Swaminatha Iyer’s autobiography En Sarithiram, refers to this bond and to his 1892 visit to Kathiramangalam to attend the gruhapravesam of Kalyanasundarmier's newly built home.

== Political career ==
In 1892, Kalyanasundaramier was nominated to the Madras Legislative Council from the Municipalities seat ahead of Rao Bahadur S.A. Saminatha Iyer. He would go on to be nominated from the same seat for the next 3 terms, serving the council until 1897.

In 1893, he succeeded Rao Bahadur S.A. Saminatha Iyer as the Chairman of the Tanjore municipal council. In 1896, he is credited with having introduced an individual bill in the Madras Legislative Council. In 1897, he built a hall (mandapam) for the dakshina thirupathi venkatesa perumal koil in Kathiramangalam in the name of his mother. He is reputed to have dug a few wells in Kathiramangalam and built a road from the village to the main Kumbakonam-Mayiladuthurai road, all out of his own pockets.

== Personal life ==
He had at least two sons, K. Ramaratnam Aiyer, B.A. and K. Balasubramaniam Aiyer. K. Ramaratnam Aiyer was a Tamil scholar who, amongst others, wrote an early modern day commentary on Kuruntokai which was edited and published in Kalanilayam weekly between April–December 1930 by T.N. Seshachalam Iyer.

Kalyanasundaramier died sometime in the late 1890s at the age of 54.
