= H. D. Phillips =

Henry Dominic Phillips (died 1892) was a British civil servant of the Indian civil service who served as an official member of the Madras Legislative Council from 1863 to 1868. He took his seat in December 1864.

== Life ==
Phillips had his initial education in the United Kingdom and qualified for the Indian civil service in 1829. He joined the Indian civil service the same year and served from 1829 to 1869.

In 1841 Phillips was appointed a senior merchant of the East India Company. He was appointed a puisne judge of the Sadr Faujdari Adalat in Madras, in 1859.

He later served as a puisne judge of the Madras High Court, and resigned at the end of 1864. In 1868 he found himself in a minority of one on the Council, on a question relating to the judicial independence of Travancore. He resigned on 12 December 1869.

Phillips later resided at Hampton Wick, outside London. He died there, at The Maples, on 9 March 1892.

== Family ==
Phillips married in 1837 Mary Moore, daughter of the civil servant George Moore, who died on 6 December 1840. In 1842 he married Caroline Charlotte Tulloch, daughter of Alexander Tulloch C.B. His daughter Emma Louisa married Herbert W. Wood, an army officer, in 1869, and his daughter Alice married Frederick Price in 1863.

Charlotte Caroline Phillips, of the Maples, Hampton Wick, died a widow on 19 April 1892.
