= T. V. Seshagiri Iyer =

Thiruchendurai Vaidyanatha Seshagiri Iyer
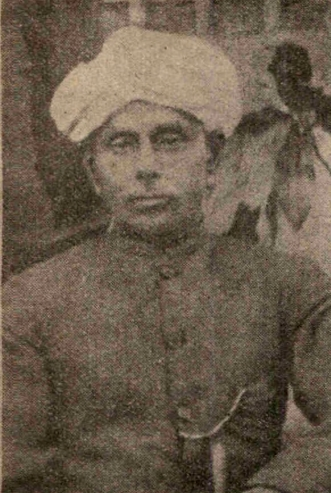
- Born: 1860; Trichinopoly district, Madras
- Died: 1926 (aged 65–66); Madras
- Education: University of Madras
- Occupations: Lawyer & politician
- Political party: Independent
- Spouse: Kalyani

Tiruchendurai Vaidyanatha Seshagiri Iyer (1860–1926) was an Indian lawyer and politician who served as a judge of the Madras High Court and represented the University of Madras in the Madras Legislative Council. Seshagiri Iyer was born in 1860 in a village in Tiruchirapalli district. He had his early education in his village and studied law in Madras. He served as a member of the Madras Legislative Council. Seshagiri Iyer was known for his public work.

== Early life ==
Seshagiri Iyer was born to Vaidyanatha Iyer in the village of Tiruchendurai in Tiruchirapalli district in 1860. He was one of Vaidyanatha Iyer's six children through his second wife, Komali, the other five being girls. Vaidynatha Iyer also had six sons namely, Mannarswamy, Ramu, Venkataraman and Subbaraman through another wife. Seshagiri Iyer's sisters were Sanamma, Seethalakshmi, Thailambal, Subbammal and Kalyani. Mannarswamy looked after the early education of his younger siblings in the family. Seshagiri Iyer married Kalyani and had two daughters Bhagi and Nagammal. The family settled down in Alwarpet, Chennai.

== Career ==
=== Legal career ===
On completion of his studies, Seshagiri Iyer joined as an apprentice of the famous Madras lawyer of British origin, Eardley Norton. During this time, Seshagiri Iyer was responsible for the Hindu Transfers and Bequests Act of 1914. This act is now popularly known as the "Seshagiri Ayyar Act". Seshagiri Iyer served as a judge of the Madras High Court from 1914 to 1920.

His name was considered for Diwan Bahadurship but was ultimately rejected by the Governor in favor of K. Narayana Row.

Seshagiri Iyer also functioned as a member of the Senate of the University of Madras. In 1916, disappointed at the very tough nature of the Intermediate Examination and the fact that very few Indian candidates had passed the examination, Seshagiri Iyer moved a resolution in the senate demanding that the pass mark for English be reduced to 30 percent. He described the tough correction at the examination as "slaughter" of the candidates. However, there was staunch opposition to this resolution by British professors. One Rev. Macphail uttered: "You bring rickshaw-wallahs and jhutkawallahs to the examination hall, and when they fail, you complain of slaughter".

=== Political career ===
Seshagiri Iyer represented the University of Madras in the Madras Legislative Council from 1921 until his death in 1926. He presided over a number of conferences during this time.

== Other public activities ==
In 1917, Seshagiri Iyer was nominated Chairman of the Tamil Lexicon Committee. As the English Boat Club of Kodaikanal refused to offer membership, Seshagiri Iyer founded the Indian Boat Club in response to discrimination against Indians in 1915. Seshagiri Iyer was one of the first Indian to own a holiday home in Kodaikanal.

Seshagiri Iyer presided over the public meeting on 7 January 1926 at Soundarya Mahal in which the Madras Music Academy was formed.

== Death ==
Seshagiri Iyer died in February 1926.

== Legacy ==
Seshagiri Iyer was known for his public spirit. He possessed a "cutting tongue and an easy sarcasm". He was also regarded as a "frank" individual and was respected by both moderates and extremists alike.

== Notes ==
| Preceded by | Member of the Madras Legislative Council for University of Madras; 1921 - 1926 | Succeeded by |
