= Venkata Ranga Rao =

Maharaja of Bobbili from 1895–1920

Maharaja Sri Sir VENKATA SVETA CHALAPATI Ranga Rao Bahadur KCIE KECM KGCM DD
- 11th Maharaja of Bobbili
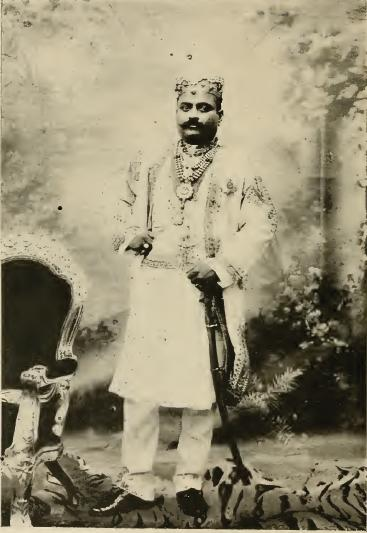
- His Highness Maharaja Maharaja Sri Sir VENKATA SVETA CHALAPATI Ranga Rao Bahadur

Maharaja of Bobbili
- Reign: 30 November 1881 – 6 November 1916
- Predecessor: Maharaja Raja SITARAMA KRISHNA RAYADAPPA Ranga Rao Bahadur Bobbili
- Successor: Maharaja Raja Sri VENKATA KUMARA KRISHNA Ranga Rao Bahadur of Bobbili
- Born: 28 August 1862; Venkatagiri, Madras Presidency Venkatagiri
- Died: 27 May 1927 (aged 64); Ooty
- Spouse: married 1stly in 1878, Rani Laxmi Venkata Ramanamma, died 1880, married 2ndly, 1881, Rani (name unknown), sister of the first wife, died in childbirth 1883, married 3rdly, 1888, Rani (name unknown), and had issue
- Issue: Maharaja Raja Sri VENKATA KUMARA KRISHNA Ranga Rao Bahadur of Bobbili
- Dynasty: Suryavansh
- Father: Maharaja Sri Raja Velugoti Sarvagna Kumara Yachendra Naidu Bahadur of Venkatagiri
- Mother: unknown
- Religion: Hinduism

Sir Sri Venkata Svetachalapathi Venkatesh Srinivasa Ranga Rao Bahadur GCIE (8 September 1862 – 1931) was an Indian landlord, maharaja, and polygar. He was zamindar of Bobbili, one of the zamindari estates in the Madras Presidency, from 1881 to 1921.

== Early life ==
Maharaja Sri Sir Venkata Sveta Chalapati Ranga Rao Bahadur, G.C.I.E., C.B.E., 11th Raja of Bobbili 1887/1921, born 28 August 1862 at Venkatagiri, third son of Sri Raja Velugoti Sarvagna Kumara Yachendra Naidu Bahadur of Venkatagiri, educated by English and Indian tutors in history, economy and Sanskrit; installed on the gaddi on 30 November 1881. The title of Raja was recognized as hereditary in 1888.

== Marriage ==
Venkata Ranga Rao married 1stly in 1878, Rani Laxmi Venkata Ramanamma, died 1880, married 2ndly, 1881, Rani (name unknown), sister of the first wife, died in childbirth 1883, married 3rdly, 1888, Rani (name unknown), and had issue

== Reign ==
Venkata Ranga Rao brought about a number of reforms during his reign as Raja of Bobbili. He raised the Middle School of Bobbili to a high school. He also established a poor schools and those for the physically and mentally handicapped. He was made a member of the Madras Legislative Council in 1890s during the governorship of Arthur Havelock.

In 1883, while Venkata Ranga Rao was on pilgrimage to Kasi, his second wife died in childbirth. This incident followed by the death of his second son in 1887 had a traumatic effect on him. In 1888, the Raja married for a third time. A third son, Ramakrishna Ranga Rao, was born in 1892.

The Raja constructed the Rao Aramane palace in Bobbili in 1888. At that time, there arose a succession dispute between the heirs to the estate of Hosur. Venkata Ranga Rao mediated between the sons of the late zamindar and helped in resolving the dispute.

In 1893, Venkata Ranga Rao made a tour of Europe along with his youngest brother Venugopala Ranga Rao. Landing at Marseille on 14 April 1893, the Raja had audiences with the Duke of York, the Prince of Wales and Queen Victoria. The gratified Raja displayed his loyalty to the British crown by constructing the Victoria Market in 1887 and the Victoria Town Hall in 1894 in honour of the Queen.

In 1902, Venkata Ranga Rao was chosen to represent the Presidency of Madras at the coronation of King Edward VII and Queen Alexandra in London.

== Honors ==
In 1895, Venkata Sveta Chalapati Ranga Rao Bahadur was knighted in Ootacamund with the KCIE at a public ceremony presided over by Lord Wenlock, the then Governor of Madras. He was promoted to a GCIE in 1911.

== Legacy ==
His grandson and successor Raja Sir Sri Ramakrishna Sveta Chalapati Ranga Rao, served as the Chief Minister of Madras Presidency from 1932 to 1936.
