= Arundel Tagg Arundel =

British civil servant and colonial administrator

Sir Arundel Tagg Arundel KCSI JP (1 July 1843 – 8 November 1929) was a British civil servant and colonial administrator.

== Biography ==
Arundel was second son of William Tagg and Rachel Mary Drew. He was educated at University College School and University College London, and entered the Indian Civil Service in 1865. In 1870 he assumed the surname of Arundel.

In 1875, he was appointed Private Secretary to the Acting Governor of Madras. In 1880 he became President of the Madras Municipal Commission and a Fellow of Madras University. He 1885 he became a district and sessions judge in the Kistna region, before becoming a collector and magistrate there in 1887. In 1896 he was appointed Secretary to the Madras Government in the Revenue Department, becoming Chief Secretary in 1897. Between 1895 and 1901 he served as a member of the Madras Legislative Council, before serving on the Viceroy's Executive Council from 1901 until his retirement in 1906. He was invested as a Companion of the Order of the Star of India in 1899 and elevated as a Knight Commander in the 1904 New Year Honours.

In retirement he was a Justice of the Peace in Surrey.
