= Govinda Krishna Yachendra =

Indian nobleman and politician

V. Govinda Krishna Yachendra
- Maharaja Sahib Mushfiq Meherban Karamfarmage Mukhsari Umdu-i-Raja, Maharaja of Venkatagiri
- Reign: 1917 to 1937
- Coronation: 1 February 1917
- Predecessor: Rajagopala Krishna Yachendra
- Successor: Velugoti Sarvagna Krishna
- Born: 15 October 1879
- Died: 1937 (aged 57–58)
Names
- Velugoti Govinda Krishna Yachendra
- Dynasty: Velugoti
- Father: Rajagopala Krishna Yachendra
- Religion: Hinduism

Maharaja Lieut. Sir Velugoti Govinda Krishna Yachendra KCIE ADC (1879–1937) was an Indian nobleman. He was the Maharaja of Venkatagiri in Nellore district from 1917 to 1937. He was the 29th Maharaja of Venkatagiri. He belonged to the royal Velugoti Dynasty of the Padmanayaka Velamas.

== Installation as King ==
The Installation ceremony occurred on 1 February 1917. It was attended by several distinguished guests, some among them being the chief of Ceylon, the Padikura Mudaliyar, N. D. A. Sibra, Wijaya Singh, J. P. U. P. M. and Lama Etanis Wijaya Singhe, the late Honourable Rajahs of Bobbili, Bhadrachalam and Kalahasti.

On the 26th of the same month His Excellency Lord Pentland, the then Governor of Madras paid a visit to Venkatagiri, and laid the Foundation Stone of the Gosha Hospital proposed to be built in the name of Her Imperial Majesty Queen Mary to remove the suffering of women. Building was opened by H.E. Lady Willingdon, on 20 November 1922.

The Rajah was honoured with the Second Lieutenancy in the Indian Land Force, and underwent training for more than a year under the Madras Guards. He is the first Indian Rajah who has been enlisted in British Regiment. In 1919 he was transferred to the Prince of Wales's Leinster Regiment (Royal Canadians) which he had subsequently left owing to its disbandment after the Irish Treaty, and has been re-attached to the Madras Guards.

He is married and had 3 sons. He died in 1937.

== Honours ==
On the 19th March, 1920, the Rajah was raised to the rank of Honorary Aide-de-Camp to His Excellency the Governor of Madras. He was made a Knight Commander of the Order of the Indian Empire (KCIE) in January 1922.

== Notes ==
- Venkatagiri zamindari
