= K. Vasudeva Iyengar =

Indian politician

Kodiyalam Vasudeva Iyengar was an Indian politician who served as a member of the Madras Legislative Council from 1903 to 1906.
