= P. P. Hutchins =

Sir Philip Perceval Hutchins KCSI (28 January 1838 – 21 May 1928) was a British lawyer and civil servant who served as a member of the Madras Legislative Council and the Imperial Legislative Council of India.

== Early life and education ==
Hutchins was born on 28 January 1838 to William Hutchins. He was educated at Merchant Taylors' and Haileybury. In 1857, Hutchins entered the Indian civil service. Hutchins also studied law and qualified for the bar in 1875.

== Appointments ==
Hutchins served as a judge of the Madras High Court from 1883 to 1886 and Madras Legislative Council from 1886 to 1888. In 1898, he was appointed to the Imperial Legislative Council of India.

== Honours ==
Hutchins was made a Companion of the Order of the Star of India in 1888 and Knight Commander of the Order of the Star of India in 1891.
