= Henry Martin Winterbotham =

Sir Henry Martin Winterbotham, KCSI, JP (13 January 1847 – 6 October 1932) was a British administrator in India. A member of the Indian Civil Service, he spent his career in southern India, rising to become a member of the Madras Board of Revenue as Commissioner of Revenue Settlement, Director of Agriculture, as well as a member of the Madras Legislative Council.
