= A. F. Brown =

Scottish industrialist (1825–1910)

Alexander Forrester Brown
- Born: October 1825
- Died: November 1910 (aged 85)
- Occupation: Industrialist

Alexander Forrester Brown (15 October 1825 – 14 November 1910) was a Scottish industrialist who served as a member of the Madras Legislative Council from 1865 to 1867.

He was born in Kilrenny, Fife, Scotland, the son of James Brown and Mary Forrester.

Brown began his career as an employee of Parry before being appointed as a director of the Devalah Central-Gold Mines. In 1880, he was appointed Director of the Oriental Bank Corporation. Brown was elected in 1866-67 as the President of the Madras Chamber of Commerce and was re-elected in 1868.

Brown was appointed additional member of the Madras Legislative Council on 2 December 1865 and served until 1867.

He died at Fords Hotel in Manchester Square, London.
