= K. R. Guruswami Iyer =

Indian lawyer, politician and Indian independence activist

K. R. Guruswami Iyer was an Indian lawyer, politician and Indian independence activist from Tinnevely who served as a member of the Madras Legislative Council from 1905 to 1909. He was also one of the early leaders of the Indian National Congress.
