= 1904 New Year Honours =

Appointments to various orders and honours of British India

The New Year Honours 1904, announced at the time as the Indian Honours, were appointments to various orders and honours of British India. The list was published in The Times on 1 January 1904, and the various honours were gazetted in The London Gazette on the same day.

The recipients of honours are displayed here as they were styled before their new honour, and arranged by honour, with classes (Knight, Knight Grand Cross, etc.) and then divisions (Military, Civil, etc.) as appropriate.

A list of appointments to the Royal Victorian Order was announced in the London Gazette on 29 December 1903. These were not included in the New Year Honours list, as the individuals had already received their decorations in late 1903. They have been added to the end of this page to show the most complete picture of orders awarded.

The recipients of honours are displayed here as they were styled before their new honour, and arranged by honour, with classes (Knight, Knight Grand Cross, etc.) and then divisions (Military, Civil, etc.) as appropriate.

== Knight Bachelor ==
- Walter Mytton Colvin, Esq., Barrister-at-Law, lately a Member of the Indian Police Commission

== Order of the Star of India ==
=== Knights Commander of the Order of the Star of India (KCSI) ===
- Arundel Tagg Arundel, Esq., CSI, Indian Civil Service, an Ordinary Member of the Council of the Governor-General.
- James Austin Bourdillon, Esq., CSI, Indian Civil Service, Resident in Mysore and Chief Commissioner of Coorg, lately Acting Lieutenant-Governor of Bengal.

=== Companions of the Order of the Star of India (CSI) ===
- Edmund McGildowny Hope Falton, Esq., Indian Civil Service, Member of the Council of the Governor of Bombay.
- Alfred Brereton, Esq., Secretary to the Government of India, Public Works Department, Railway Branch.
- John Hooper, Esq., Indian Civil Service, Officiating Member of the Board of Revenue, and a Member of the Council of the Lieutenant-Governor of the United Provinces for making Laws and Regulations.
- William Thomas Hall, Esq., Indian Civil Service, Financial Commissioner of Burma, and a Member of the Council of the Lieutenant-Governor of Burma for making Laws and Regulations.
- Richard Townsend Greer, Esq., Indian Civil Service, Chairman of the Corporation of Calcutta, and a Member of the Council of the Lieutenant-Governor of Bengal for making Laws and Regulations.
- Lieutenant-Colonel Robert Henry Jennings, Royal Engineers, Resident in the Western States of Rajputana.
- Harold Arthur Stuart, Esq., Indian Civil Service, Inspector-General of Police, Madras, lately Secretary, Indian Police Commission.

== Order of the Indian Empire ==
=== Knights Commander of the Order of the Indian Empire (KCIE) ===
- Major-General Sir Edmond Roche Elles, KCB, Royal Artillery, an Ordinary Member of the Council of the Governor-General.
- Sardar Sultan Jan Saddozai, CIE, lately Extra Assistant Commissioner at Headquarters, Kohat.

=== Companions of the Order of the Indian Empire (CIE) ===
- William Thomas Blanford, Esq., late of the Geological Survey of India.
- Gopal Krishna Gokhale, Esq., an Additional Member of the Council of the Governor-General for making Laws and Regulations.
- Robert Douglas Hare, Esq., Commissioner of Berar.
- William Bell, Esq., Director of Public Instruction in the Punjab, and Undersecretary to the Government of the Punjab, Educational Department.
- Claude Hamilton Archer Hill, Esq., Indian Civil Service, Deputy Secretary to the Government of India in the Foreign Department, lately Private Secretary to the Governor of Bombay.
- Edward Henry Scamander Clarke, Esq., Assistant Secretary to the Government of India, Foreign Department.
- Webster Boyle Gordon, Esq., Superintending Engineer, lately Secretary to the Indian Irrigation Commission.
- James Walker, Esq., Indian Civil Service, Deputy Commissioner of Nagpur.
- Major Robert Arthur Edward Benn, Indian Army, Vice-Consul for Seistan and Kain.
- Madhu Sudhan Das, Esq., of Cuttack, lately a Member of the Council of the Lieutenant-Governor of Bengal for making Laws and Regulations.
- George James Perram, Esq., lately Chief Engineer and Secretary to the Chief Commissioner of Assam, Public Works Department.
- Raja Partab Bahadur Singh, Talukdar of Kila Partabgarh, Oudh.
- Raja Jahaudad Khan, Khan Bahadur, Extra Assistant Commissioner in the Punjab.

== Royal Victorian Order ==
=== Knight Grand Cross of the Royal Victorian Order (GCVO) ===
Honorary

- His Imperial Highness the Grand Duke Wladimir Alexandrovitch of Russia.

=== Knight Commander of the Royal Victorian Order (KCVO) ===
- James Thomas Knowles, Esq.

=== Commander of the Royal Victorian Order (CVO) ===
- Lieutenant-Colonel Simon Joseph, Baron Lovat, CB, DSO, Commanding Lovat's Scouts.
- Sir Gabriel Prior Goldney, Bart., CB
- Colonel Herbert Scott Gould Miles, CB, MVO

Honorary

- Prince Serge Belosselsky-Belozersky, Captain of His Imperial Majesty the Emperor of Russia's Horse Guards, and Aide-de-Camp to His Imperial Highness the Grand Duke Wladimir Alexandrovitch of Russia.
- Monsieur Alexandra de Etter, Chamberlain to His Imperial Majesty the Emperor of Russia, and attached to the Suite of Her Imperial Highness the Grand Duchess Wladimir Alexandravitch of Russia.
- Lieutenant-Colonel Louis Rohdendorff, MVO, His Imperial Majesty the Emperor of Russia's Feldjager Corps.

=== Member of the Royal Victorian Order, 4th class (MVO) ===
- Lieutenant-Colonel Gordon Carter, late 1st Life Guards.
- Harold Edwin Boulton, Esq., Honorary Treasurer Queen Victoria's Jubilee Institute for Nurses.

=== Member of the Royal Victorian Order, 5th class (MVO) ===
- Second Lieutenant Charles Godfrey, Royal Horse Guards.
