= James Duncan Sim =

James Duncan Sim CSI (c. 1823 – 4 January 1888) was a British civil servant of the Indian civil service who served as a member of the Madras Legislative Council from March 1870 to March 1875.

== Early life and education ==
Sim was born in 1823 to General Duncan Sim and was educated at Haileybury. On graduating in 1841, Sim wrote the Indian civil service examinations and qualified for the Indian civil service.

== Career ==
Sim went to Madras, India in 1842 and served as Secretary to the Board of Revenue and Revenue Secretary to the Madras government. He was nominated to the Madras Legislative Council in 1870 and served five terms from March 1870 to March 1875.

== Later life and death ==
Sim retired from service in 1875 and died on 4 January 1888.

Sim was made a Companion of the Order of the Star of India in 1868.

== Memorials ==
Sim's Park in Coonoor, Nilgiris District is named after James Duncan Sim.
