= Kolanka Cup =

Indian polo trophy

The Rajah of Kolanka with the Kolanka Cup in 1936

The Kolanka Cup is a polo trophy awarded in India. According to the Guinness Book of World Records, it is the "tallest sports trophy in the world". It is named after the Rajah of Kolanka Sri Rajah Rao Pradyumna Krishna Mahipati Suryarao Bahadur who commissioned it while playing polo for the Kolanka team. The Rajah of Kolanka was the 4th Rajakumar of Venkatagiri. He was the fourth son of the 29th Raja of Venkatagiri and the grandson of Rajagopala Krishna Yachendra of Venkatagiri and was adopted by the childless Rani of Kolanka.

The Kolanka Cup is 6 feet tall and is made out of pure silver.

The last match for the Kolanka Cup is said to have been played in 1998. Since then the cup has been in storage.
