= Gangadhara Rama Rao =

Indian politician

- Born: circa 1844
- Died: 22 July 1890 (aged 45–46)
- Occupation: politician
- Years active: 1878–1881
- Known for: member, Madras Legislative Council
- Notable work: established Pithapuram Raja College (1884)

Gangadhara Rama Rao (c. 1844 – 22 July 1890) was an Indian politician and zamindar of Pittapore in the Madras Presidency who served as a member of the Madras Legislative Council from 1878 to 1881.

Gangadhara Rama Rao ascended the throne of Pittapore or Pithapuram in 1877. He established the Pithapuram Raja College in 1884.
