= James Spring Branson =

Indian politician (1842–1897)

James Henry Spring Branson

Advocate-General of Madras Presidency
- In office 1887–1897
- Succeeded by: V. Bhashyam Aiyangar (acting)

Member of the Madras Legislative Council
- In office 1886–1897

Personal details
- Born: 2 January 1842 Madras, India
- Died: 8 April 1897 (aged 54) Marylebone, London
- Occupation: lawyer
- Profession: Advocate-General, legislator

James Henry Spring Branson (2 January 1842 – 8 April 1897) was an officer of the Indian volunteer force and a lawyer, who was the acting Advocate General of the Madras Presidency.

== Career ==
Spring Branson was commissioned into the Indian volunteer force and served with the Madras Artillery Volunteers. As Commandant, his decision to allow "native gentlemen" to serve with the regiment almost caused a revolt amongst the white soldiers. The Madras Government hastily rescinded Spring Branson's order and continued to enforce the ban on "native" volunteers. He resigned from the army as a lieutenant-colonel a few years later in order to practice as a lawyer.

He was appointed first, Crown Prosecutor and then, Public-Prosecutor, Madras, 4 July 1885. In March 1887, he was appointed acting Advocate-General of Madras Presidency. Spring Branson served as a legislator in the Madras Legislative Council between 1886 and his death. He served as President of the Madras Bar Association.

Branson Gardens in Chennai are named after him.

== Family ==
The son of barrister James William Branson (1813–1870) and Wilhelmina Jane (née Harris) Branson (1816–1888), born in Madras, now Chennai, India, on 2nd January 1842.

He married Mary Isabella Emerton on 14 February 1859 at Holy Cross Church, Canterbury, Kent, England. They had five children together.

He died in Marylebone, London, in 1897, aged 55.
