= C. G. Master =

Charles Gilbert Master CSI (c. 1833 – 9 March 1903) was a British civil servant who served as a member of the executive council of the Governor of Madras from 1884 to 1889.

== Early life and education ==
Master was born in 1833, the son of an Archdeacon of Manchester. He completed his education at Haileybury in 1852–53 and qualified for the Indian civil service.

== Career ==
Master moved to India in 1854 and served as Commissioner of Income Tax from 1860 to 1865 and Revenue Secretary to the Madras government from 1877 to 1882, when he was made Chief Secretary.

Master served as a member of the Madras Legislative Council from 1884 to 1889. He was made a Companion of the Order of the Star of India in 1887.

== Death ==
Master died on 9 March 1903.
