= A. Sabhapathi Mudaliar =

Indian industrialist, businessman and Indian independence activist

- Occupations: Indian industrialist; Businessman; Indian independence activist
- Notable work: Mudaliar represented Bellary at the first session of the Indian National Congress held in Bombay in December 1985.

Rao Bahadur Arcot Sabhapathi Mudaliar was an Indian industrialist, businessman and Indian independence activist who was an early pioneer of the Indian National Congress and framed its constitution.

== Personal life ==
Sabhapathi Mudaliar was born in a Tamil-speaking Arcot Mudaliar family from Bellary in the then Madras Presidency. on completion of his studies, Mudaliar started a successful textile business.

== Politics ==
Mudaliar entered politics in 1882 when he volunteered to lead a campaign for the economic growth of Rayalaseema.Mudaliar represented Bellary at the first session of the Indian National Congress held in Bombay in December 1885. During the third session held in Madras in 1887, Mudaliar was appointed member of the 35-member committee which wrote the constitution of the congress.
