= Goday Narayana Gajapathi Rao =

Indian politician

Sir Goday Narayana Gajapathi Rao KCIE (1 December 1828 – May 1903) was an Indian aristocrat and politician who served as a member of the Madras Legislative Council from 1868 to 1884.

== Life ==
Maharajah Sir Goday Narayana Gajapthi Rao garu was the last direct male lineal representative of the ancient Goday family, born on 1 December 1828. He received education at home from Sri Paravasthu Srinivasachariayr. At the age of thirteen he was sent to Calcutta in January 1841 for further education at Hindu College. After nine years of stay in Calcutta Sri Goday Narayana Gajapthi Rao garu returned to Vizagapatam in April 1849 and joined his brother in management of revenue affairs of their estates. He was instrumental in establishment of Hindu College at Vizagapatam.

In 1875 famine, Sir Goday Narayana Gajapthi Rao garu opened relief houses in his estates where the poor and destitute were daily fed. He founded a Sanskrit Prize at University of Madras which is known as the 'Godayvari Sanskrit Prize'.

The two most unhappy and painful events in his life were first the unexpected and untimely widowhood of his elder daughter, the Rani Sahiba of Wadhwan and premature death of his younger daughter, the Rani of Kurupam. After these incidents Maharjah could not discharge his duties with usual energy and interest. Maharajah Sir Goday Narayana Gajapthi Rao garu died in May 1903.

== Family ==
The Goday family is known to be one of the most influential ancient families - Goday Akkamma garu, Goday Bhupathi garu, Goday Pedda Surya Rao garu, Goday Chinna Surya Rao garu being eminent persons of their time.

Nizam's government gave large grants of land to Goday Bhupathi garu in recognition of his services. He built two temples for Siva and Kesava. His successor, Goday Pedda Surya Rao garu, received a sword from Nizam as a present for his service on the battlefield. In the 17th century Britishers came into actual possession of the circars.

Mr. Andrews, the Chief in Service of East India Company was obliged to Sri Goday Jugga Rao garu, representative of Goday families for his help in times of emergency. The East India Company presented him a 'Shaiban Palkee', an umbrella and other insignia of royalty. Goday Jugga Rao garu was a great promoter of Telugu literature and orthodox Hindu, he practiced 'Saptha Santhana' Seven good works of perpetuality. He also founded a choultry in Kashi. He died in 1805 leaving two sons, Surya Prakasa Rao and Surya Narayana Rao and three daughters, Subhadrayamma, Bangaramma and Laskminarsayamma. In the days of no female education he provided decent education to his daughters. His daughter Subharayamma (married to Madina family and known as Madina Subhadrayamma) evinced great interest in Telugu poetry and acquired reputation as a poet.

Goday Surya Praksa Rao garu was a highly accomplished scholar and owned a large horticultural garden in Anakapalli. Upon his death in 1841, his extensive estates devolved upon his widow and after her, upon her younger surviving daughter. After her death, son of her uncle, Maharaja Sir G.N. Gajapthi Rao garu became the reversionary heir.

Goday Suryanaryana Rao had two sons, Venkata Jugga Rao and Narayana Gajapthi Rao. He sent elder son Venkata Jugga Rao to Madras and younger son Narayana Gajapthi Rao to Calcutta for studies. The journey to these places was very tough those days as no trains or safe roads exist. Still these youths travelled to their destinations under proper escorts and guardians.
