= Edmund Foster Webster =

Indian politician

Edmund Foster Webster CIE was a British civil servant of the Indian Civil Service who served as a member of the Madras Legislative Council in 1883.

== Early life ==
Webster was born to James Webster of Hatherley Court, Gloucestershire and was educated at Cheltenham College. On completion of his education, Webster wrote the Indian civil service examinations and qualified for the civil service.

== Career ==
Webster served as Revenue Secretary to the Madras Government from 1881 to 1883, when he was nominated to the Madras Legislative Council. He also served as Chief Secretary to the Governor of Madras.
