= List of presidents of the Indian National Congress =

Chief executives of the INC

President of the Indian National Congress

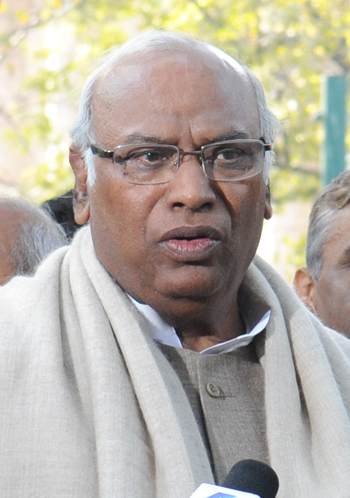
- Incumbent; Mallikarjun Kharge since 26 October 2022
- Appointer: Committee consisting of members of the Indian National Congress from the National and State Committees
- Term length: no term limit
- Constituting instrument: Constitution of the Indian National Congress
- Precursor: Sonia Gandhi (interim); Rahul Gandhi
- Formation: 28 December 1885
- Website: Official website

The President of the Indian National Congress is the chief executive of the Indian National Congress (INC), one of the principal political parties in India, founded by retired British civil servant Allan Octavian Hume. Constitutionally, the president is elected by an electoral college composed of members drawn from the Pradesh Congress Committees and members of the All India Congress Committee (AICC). In the event of any emergency because of any cause such as the death or resignation of the president elected as above, the most senior general secretary discharges the routine functions of the president until the Working Committee appoints a provisional president pending the election of a regular president by the AICC. The president of the party has effectively been the party's national leader, head of the party's organisation, head of the Working Committee, the chief spokesman, and all chief Congress committees.

After the party's foundation in December 1885, Womesh Chandra Banerjee became its first president. From 1885 to 1933, the presidency had a term of one year only. From 1933 onwards, there was no such fixed term for the president. During Jawaharlal Nehru's premiership, he rarely held the Presidency of INC, even though he was always head of the Parliamentary Party. Despite being a party with a structure, Congress under Indira Gandhi did not hold any organisational elections after 1978. In 1978, Gandhi split from the INC and formed a new opposition party, popularly called Congress (I), which the national election commission declared to be the real Indian National Congress for the 1980 general election. Gandhi institutionalised the practice of having the same person as the Congress president and the prime minister of India after the formation of Congress (I). Her successors Rajiv Gandhi and P. V. Narasimha Rao also continued that practice. Nonetheless, in 2004, when the Congress was voted back into power, Manmohan Singh became the first and only prime minister not to be the president of the party since establishment of the practice of the president holding both positions.

A total of 61 people have served as the president of the Indian National Congress since its formation. Sonia Gandhi is the longest serving president of the party, having held the office for over twenty years from 1998 to 2017 and from 2019 to 2022. The latest election of president was held on 17 October 2022, in which Mallikarjun Kharge became the new president defeating Shashi Tharoor in the 2022 Indian National Congress presidential election.

== During the founding years (1885–1900) ==
List of presidents during 1885–1900
No.	Year(s) of presidency	Leader	Portrait	Place of conference	Reference(s)
1	December 1885	Womesh Chandra Bonnerjee	An image of Womesh Chandra Bonnerjee.	Bombay	
2	December 1886	Dadabhai Naoroji	An image of Dadabhai Naoroji.	Calcutta	
3	December 1887	Badruddin Tyabji	An image of Badruddin Tyabji.	Madras	
4	December 1888	George Yule	An image of George Yule.	Allahabad	
5	December 1889	William Wedderburn	An image of William Wedderburn.	Bombay	
6	December 1890	Pherozeshah Mehta	An image of Pherozesha Mehta.	Calcutta	
7	December 1891	Panapakkam Anandacharlu		Nagpur	
8	December 1892	Womesh Chandra Bonnerjee	An image of Womesh Chandra Bonnerjee.	Allahabad	
9	December 1893	Dadabhai Naoroji	An image of Dadabhai Naoroji.	Lahore	
10	December 1894	Alfred Webb	An image of Alfred Webb.	Madras	
11	December 1895	Surendranath Banerjee	An image of Surendranath Banerjee.	Poona	
12	December 1896	Rahimtulla M. Sayani	An image of Rahimtulla M. Sayani.	Calcutta	
13	December 1897	C. Sankaran Nair	An image of C Sankaran Nair.	Amaravati	
14	December 1898	Anandamohan Bose	An image of Anandamohan Bose.	Madras	
15	December 1899	Romesh Chunder Dutt	An image of Romesh Chunder Dutt.	Lucknow	
16	December 1900	N. G. Chandavarkar	An image of N. G. Chandavarkar.	Lahore	

== List of party presidents during the pre-independence era (1901–1947) ==
List of presidents during 1901–1947
No.	Year(s) of presidency	Name	Portrait	Place of conference	Reference(s)
17	December 1901	Dinshaw Edulji Wacha	An image of Dinshaw Edulji Wacha.	Calcutta	
18	December 1902	Surendranath Banerjee	An image of Surendranath Banerjee.	Ahmedabad	
19	December 1903	Lalmohan Ghosh		Madras	
20	December 1904	Henry John Stedman Cotton	An image of Henry Cotton.	Bombay	
21	December 1905	Gopal Krishna Gokhale	An image of Gopal Krishna Gokhale.	Benares	
22	December 1906	Dadabhai Naoroji	An image of Dadabhai Naoroji.	Calcutta	
23	December 1907	Rashbihari Ghosh	An image of Rashbihari Ghosh.	Surat	
24	December 1908	Rashbihari Ghosh	An image of Rashbihari Ghosh.	Madras	
25	December 1909	Madan Mohan Malaviya	An image of Madan Mohan Malaviya.	Lahore	
26	December 1910	William Wedderburn	An image of William Wedderburn.	Allahabad	
27	December 1911	Bishan Narayan Dar		Calcutta	
28	December 1912	Raghunath Narasinha Mudholkar	An image of Raghunath Narasinha Mudholkar.	Bankipore	
29	December 1913	Nawab Syed Muhammad Bahadur		Karachi	
30	April 1914	Bhupendra Nath Bose		Madras	
31	December 1915	Satyendra Prasanno Sinha	An image of Satyendra Prasanno Sinha.	Bombay	
32	December 1916	Ambica Charan Mazumdar	An image of Ambica Charan Mazumdar.	Lucknow	
33	December 1917	Annie Besant	An image of Annie Besant.	Calcutta	
34	August 1918	Syed Hasan Imam	An image of Syed Hasan Imam.	Bombay (special session)	
35	December 1918	Madan Mohan Malaviya	An image of Madan Mohan Malaviya.	Delhi	
36	December 1919	Motilal Nehru	An image of Motilal Nehru.	Amritsar	
37	1920	Lala Lajpat Rai	An image of Lala Lajpat Rai.	Calcutta (Special Session)	
38	December 1920	C. Vijayaraghavachariar	An image of C. Vijayaraghavachariar.	Nagpur	
39	December 1921	Hakim Ajmal Khan	An image of Hakim Ajmal Khan.	Ahmedabad	
40	December 1922	Chittaranjan Das	An image of Chittaranjan Das.	Gaya	
41	1923	Mohammad Ali Jauhar	An image of Mohammad Ali Jouhar.	Kakinada	
42	September 1923	Abul Kalam Azad	An image of Abul Kalam Azad.	Delhi (Special Session)	
43	December 1924	Mahatma Gandhi	An image of Mahatma Gandhi.	Belgaum	
44	April 1925	Sarojini Naidu	An image of Sarojini Naidu.	Kanpur	
45	December 1926	S. Srinivasa Iyengar	An image of S. Srinivasa Iyengar.	Guwahati	
46	December 1927	Mukhtar Ahmed Ansari	An image of Mukhtar Ahmad Ansari	Madras	
47	1928	Motilal Nehru	An image of Motilal Nehru.	Calcutta	
48	1929	Jawaharlal Nehru	An image of Jawaharlal Nehru.	Lahore	
49	1930	Jawaharlal Nehru	An image of Jawaharlal Nehru.	Karachi	
50	1931	Vallabhbhai Patel	An image of Vallabhbhai Patel.	Karachi	
51	1932	Madan Mohan Malaviya	An image of Madan Mohan Malaviya.	Delhi	
52	1933	Nellie Sengupta	An image of Nellie Sengupta.	Calcutta	
53	1934	Rajendra Prasad	An image of Rajendra Prasad.	Bombay	
54	1935	Rajendra Prasad	An image of Rajendra Prasad.	Lucknow	
55	1936	Jawaharlal Nehru	An image of Jawaharlal Nehru.	Lucknow	
56	1937	Jawaharlal Nehru	An image of Jawaharlal Nehru.	Faizpur	
57	1938	Subhas Chandra Bose	Subhas Chandra Bose	Haripura	
58	1939	Subhas Chandra Bose	Subhas Chandra Bose	Tewar, Madhya Pradesh (then Tripuri)	
59	1939 (March)	Rajendra Prasad	An image of Rajendra Prasad.	Tewar, Madhya Pradesh (then Tripuri)	
60	1940–46 Duration of World war 2	Abul Kalam Azad	An image of Abul Kalam Azad.	Ramgarh	
61	1946 (July–Sept)	Jawaharlal Nehru			
62	1946	J. B. Kripalani	An image of J. B. Kripalani.	Meerut	
63	1947	J. B. Kripalani	An image of J. B. Kripalani.		

== List of party presidents during the post-independence era (1948–present) ==
List of presidents since independence
No.	Year(s) of Presidency	Name	Portrait	Place of Conference	Reference(s)
64	1948	Bhogaraju Pattabhi Sitaramayya	An image of Pattabhi Sitaraimayya.	Jaipur	
65	1949	Bhogaraju Pattabhi Sitaramayya	An image of Pattabhi Sitaraimayya.	Jaipur	
66	1950	Purushottam Das Tandon	An image of Purushottam Das Tandon.	Nashik	
67	1951	Jawaharlal Nehru	An image of Jawaharlal Nehru.	New Delhi	
68	1952	Jawaharlal Nehru	An image of Jawaharlal Nehru.	New Delhi	
69	1953	Jawaharlal Nehru	An image of Jawaharlal Nehru.	Hyderabad	
70	1954	Jawaharlal Nehru	An image of Jawaharlal Nehru.	Kalyani	
71	1955	U. N. Dhebar	An image of U. N. Dhebar.	Avadi	
72	1956	U. N. Dhebar	An image of U. N. Dhebar.	Amritsar	
73	1957	U. N. Dhebar	An image of U. N. Dhebar.	Indore	
74	1958	U. N. Dhebar	An image of U. N. Dhebar.	Guwahati	
75	1959	U. N. Dhebar	An image of U. N. Dhebar.	Nagpur	
76	1959	Indira Gandhi	An image of Indira Gandhi.	Delhi (special session)	
73	1960	Neelam Sanjiva Reddy	An image of Neelam Sanjiva Reddy.	Bengaluru	
74	1961	Neelam Sanjiva Reddy	An image of Neelam Sanjiva Reddy.	Bhavnagar	
75	1962	Damodaram Sanjivayya	An image of Damodaram Sanjivayya.	Patna	
75	1962–1963	Neelam Sanjiva Reddy	An image of Neelam Sanjiva Reddy.	Patna	
76	1964	K. Kamaraj	An image of K. Kamaraj.	Bhubaneswar	
77	1965	K. Kamaraj	An image of K. Kamaraj.	Durgapur	
78	1966–1967	K. Kamaraj	An image of K. Kamaraj.	Jaipur	
79	1968	S. Nijalingappa	An image of S. Nijalingappa.	Hyderabad	
80	1969	S. Nijalingappa	An image of S. Nijalingappa.	Faridabad	
81	1970–1971	Jagjivan Ram	An image of Jagjivan Ram.	Mumbai	
82	1972–74	Shankar Dayal Sharma	An image of Shankar Dayal Sharma.	Kolkata	
83	1975–77	D. K. Barooah	An image of Devakanta Barua.	Chandigarh	
84	1977–78	Kasu Brahmananda Reddy	An image of Kasu Brahmananda Reddy	Chandigarh	
85	1978–83	Indira Gandhi	An image of Indira Gandhi.	New Delhi	
85	1983	Indira Gandhi	An image of Indira Gandhi.	Kolkata	
86	1985–1991	Rajiv Gandhi	An image of Rajiv Gandhi.	Mumbai	
87	1992	P. V. Narasimha Rao		Tirupati	
88	1993	P. V. Narasimha Rao		Surajkund	
89	1994	P. V. Narasimha Rao		Delhi	
90	1996–1998	Sitaram Kesri		Kolkata	
91	1998–2001	Sonia Gandhi		New Delhi	
92	2001–2004	Sonia Gandhi		Bengaluru	
93	2004–2006	Sonia Gandhi		New Delhi	
94	2006–2010	Sonia Gandhi		Hyderabad	
95	2010–2017	Sonia Gandhi		New Delhi	
96	2017–2019	Rahul Gandhi		New Delhi	
97	2019–2022	Sonia Gandhi	An image of Sonia Gandhi.	Jaipur	
98	2022–Incumbent	Mallikarjun Kharge		New Delhi	

== See also ==
- Gandhi–Nehru family
- List of state presidents of the Indian National Congress
- List of national presidents of the Bharatiya Janata Party
- List of general secretaries of the All India Anna Dravida Munnetra Kazhagam
