= P. Chentsal Rao =

Indian civil servant

Rajatantra Pravina Palle Chentsal Rao Pantulu CIE (September 28, 1832 – 1901) was an Indian civil servant who served as a member of the Madras Legislative Council from 1887 to 1892.

== Biography ==
Chentsal Rao was born to Venkoba Rao and Hanumaima in a village called Palle in the princely state of Hyderabad on September 28, 1832. His father served as the tahsildar of Nellore. On completion of his graduation, he joined the provincial civil service and was eventually appointed Sheristadar of the Madras Revenue Board in 1872. From 1882 to 1887, Chentsal Rao served as the Superintendent of Stamps and Stationery and was, in 1887, nominated to the Madras Legislative Council.

Chentsal Rao served as a member of the Madras Legislative Council from 1887 to 1892, when he was appointed member of the executive council of the Governor-General of India.

Chenstal Rao was made a Companion of the Order of the Indian Empire in 1887. He was also appointed fellow of the Madras University in 1875.

== Works ==
- Vivaha Prayoga (in Telugu).
- Sandhya Vandanam (in Telugu). 1887.
- Sankha Dharma Sastramu (in Telugu). 1888.
- Gautama Dharma Sastramu (in Telugu). 1900.
- Sri Brahma Sutrani (in Telugu). 1900.
- Pravara and Gotra (in Telugu). 1901.
