= Bishan Narayan Dar =

Indian politician

Pandit Bishan Narayan Dar (1864 – 19 November 1916) was an Indian politician who served as the President of the Indian National Congress for one term in 1911.

Dar belonged to a prominent Kashmiri Pandit family from Lucknow. His uncle Pandit Shambhu Nath was the first Indian Judge of the Calcutta High Court. Dar studied at the Church Mission High School and Canning College in Lahore.

Dar went to England where he practised as a lawyer. After his return to India, he joined the Indian National Congress in 1887. He was the President of the United Provincial Conference in 1911 and the President of the Indian National Congress in the same year. In 1914, he was elected as a member of the Imperial Legislative Council from the United Provinces.
