= G-23 (political group) =

Indian political group

The G-23 was a group of 23 Indian members of parliament that were in the Indian National Congress party and that wrote a letter asking for stronger leadership.

== List of G-23 members ==
Serial	Name	Posts Held	State	Current Status
1	Ghulam Nabi Azad	then Leader of the Opposition in Rajya Sabha; Chief Minister of Jammu & Kashmir (2005 - 2008); Union Minister (1991 - 96, 2004 - 2005); Cabinet Minister (1982, 1983-87)	Jammu and Kashmir	Left Congress in 2022 to form Democratic Progressive Azad Party.
2	Anand Sharma	then Deputy Leader of the Opposition in Rajya Sabha; Union Minister	Himachal Pradesh	
3	Bhupinder Singh Hooda	then Leader of Opposition in Haryana; Chief Minister of Haryana (2005 - 2014); Member of Parliament, Lok Sabha	Haryana	
4	Milind Deora	Cabinet Minister	Maharashtra	Left Congress in 2024 to join Shiv Sena.
5	Mukul Wasnik	Cabinet Minister	Maharashtra	
6	Manish Tewari	Cabinet Minister	Punjab	
7	Shashi Tharoor	Cabinet Minister	Kerala	
8	Rajinder Kaur Bhattal	Chief Minister of Punjab; Deputy Chief Minister of Punjab; Leader of Opposition Punjab	Punjab	
9	Veerappa Moily	Chief Minister of Karnataka; Leader of Opposition Karnataka; Union Minister	Karnataka	
10	Prithviraj Chavan	Chief Minister of Maharashtra; Cabinet Minister	Maharashtra	
11	Kapil Sibal	Union Minister	Delhi	Left Congress in 2022.
12	Vivek Tankha	Member of Parliament, Rajya Sabha	Madhya Pradesh	
13	Jitin Prasada	Cabinet Minister	Uttar Pradesh	Left Congress in 2021 to join Bharatiya Janata Party.
14	Renuka Chowdhary	Union Minister	Andhra Pradesh	
15	PJ Kurien	Deputy Chairman of the Rajya Sabha	Kerala	
16	Raj Babbar	Member of Parliament, Rajya Sabha; Member of Parliament, Lok Sabha	Uttar Pradesh	
17	Kuldeep Sharma	Speaker Haryana	Haryana	
18	Yoganand Shastri	Speaker Delhi, Minister in Delhi	Delhi	Left Congress in 2021 to join Nationalist Congress Party (now Nationalist Congress Party – Sharadchandra Pawar). Returned to Congress in 2024.
19	Akhilesh Prasad Singh	Member of Parliament, Rajya Sabha	Bihar	
20	Arvinder Singh Lovely	Minister in Delhi	Delhi	Left Congress in 2024 to re-join Bharatiya Janata Party.
21	Kaul Singh Thakur	Minister in Himachal Pradesh	Himachal Pradesh	
22	Ajay Arjun Singh	Leader of Opposition; Minister in Madhya Pradesh; Son of veteran Congress leader Arjun Singh	Madhya Pradesh	
23	Sandeep Dikshit	Member of Parliament, Lok Sabha; Son of veteran Congress leader Sheila Dikshit	Delhi	
