= Nawab Syed Muhammad Bahadur =

Indian politician

Nawab Syed Muhammad Bahadur (1867 – 12 February 1919) was an Indian politician who served as the President of the Indian National Congress in 1913 at Karachi conference. He was the third Muslim to hold this position after Badruddin Tyabji and Rahimtulla M. Sayani.

Nawab Syed Muhammad was born in Calcutta as the son of Mir Humayun Jah Bahadur, one of the wealthiest Muslims of South India. Humayun Jah was the son of Shahzadi Shah Rukh Begum, daughter of Sultan Yasin, the fourth son of Tipu Sultan. He had helped the Indian National Congress in its early stages by giving both financial and intellectual support. When the third Indian National Congress was held in 1887, Humayun Bahadur gave monetary help to the Congress leaders.

Nawab Syed Muhammad joined the Indian National Congress in 1894 and became an active member of the organization. In all his speeches and addresses Syed Muhammad convincingly maintained that the Muslims and the Hindus must live like brothers and their different religions must not separate them but bind them together. He sincerely believed that the main aim of the Indian National Congress was to unite the peoples of India into a strong nation.

He was the first Muslim Sheriff of Madras and was appointed as such in 1896. He was nominated to the Madras Legislative Council, in 1900. He was nominated to the Imperial Legislative Council on 19 December 1903 as a non-official member representing the Madras Provinces. Syed Muhammad was awarded the title of "Nawab" in 1897 by the British Government when he attended the Diamond Jubilee Celebration of Queen Victoria.

He died on 12 February 1919.

The present family now stays in Bangalore. Nawab Syed Mansoor, the son of Syed Asgher. Syed Ahmed, grandson of Nawab Syed Mohammed, was settled in Kolar in 1950. Sahebzada Syed Mansoor married Sahebzadi Raheemunissa, granddaughter of Tipu Sultan from Calcutta. Sahebzada Mansoor Ali started Tehreek-e-Khudadad.

== Quotes ==
"The reluctance to revive the old village organisation and to establish village panchayats is particularly pronounced in some Provinces, while a degree of tardiness in considering proposals for the expansion of local and municipal administration coupled with the oft-repeated desire to hedge further advance with over-cautious restriction, is noticeable among all grades of administrative authorities in India."— From the Presidential Address, I.N.C., 1913, Karachi
