= Vere Hobart, Lord Hobart =

British colonial administrator (1818-1875)

Vere Henry Hobart, Lord Hobart (8 December 1818 – 27 April 1875) was a British colonial administrator.

Hobart was born in Welbourn, Lincolnshire to Augustus Hobart-Hampden, 6th Earl of Buckinghamshire and Mary Williams, daughter of Welsh barrister John Williams. In 1840, he graduated from Trinity College, Oxford with a Bachelor of Arts (B.A). Following the death of his grandfather in 1849, his father succeeded to the earldom and Vere was styled as Lord Hobart (his father's courtesy title).

On 4 August 1853, he married Mary Katherine Carr, daughter of the former Bishop of Bombay Rt. Revd. Thomas Carr and Catherine Emily MacMahon. He worked as a clerk in the Board of Trade in 1842. He was the private secretary to Sir George Grey at the Home Office in 1855. On 30 May 1856, he matriculated from Trinity College. He was the Governor of Madras from 15 May 1872 till his death on 27 April 1875, decessit vita patris. He died unexpectedly at Government House, Madras of typhoid fever.

Government offices
| Preceded by Alexander John Arbuthnot (acting) | Governor of Madras; 15 May 1872 – 27 April 1875 | Succeeded by William Rose Robinson (acting) |
