= Madras Legislative Council =

Defunct upper house in India

Tamil Nadu Legislative Council
- Tamil Nadu

Type
- Type: Upper house
- Term limits: 6 years

History
- Established: 1861
- Disbanded: 1986
- Seats: 78

Elections
- Voting system: Proportional representation, First past the post and Nominations

Meeting place
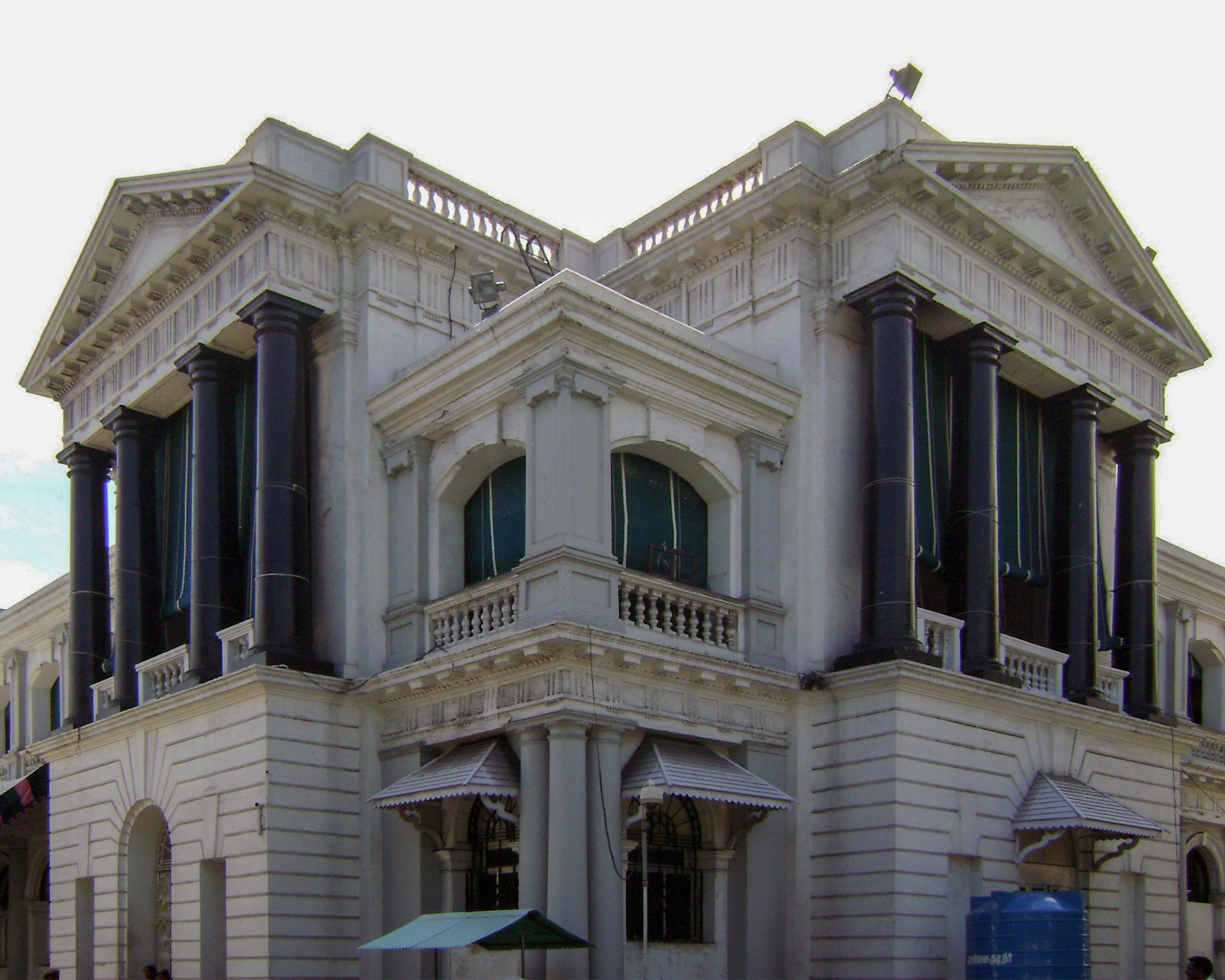
- Fort St. George 13.081539°N 80.285718°E

Tamil Nadu Legislative Council was the upper house of the former bicameral legislature of the Indian state of Tamil Nadu. It began its existence as Madras Legislative Council, the first provincial legislature for Madras Presidency. It was initially created as an advisory body in 1861, by the British colonial government. It was established by the Indian Councils Act 1861 (24 & 25 Vict. c. 67), enacted in the British parliament in the aftermath of the Indian Rebellion of 1857. Its role and strength were later expanded by the Indian Councils Act 1892 (55 & 56 Vict. c. 14). Limited election was introduced in 1909. The council became a unicameral legislative body in 1921 and eventually the upper chamber of a bicameral legislature in 1937. After India became independent in 1947, it continued to be the upper chamber of the legislature of Madras State, one of the successor states to the Madras Presidency. It was renamed as the Tamil Nadu Legislative Council when the state was renamed as Tamil Nadu in 1969. The council was abolished by the M. G. Ramachandran administration on 1 November 1986. In 1989, 1996 and 2010, the DMK regime headed by M. Karunanidhi tried to revive the council. The former AIADMK regime (2016–2021) expressed its intention not to revive the council and passed a resolution in the Tamil Nadu Legislative Assembly in this regard.

== History and evolution ==
=== Origin ===
The first Indian Councils Act 1861 set up the Madras Legislative Council as an advisory body through which the colonial administration obtained advice and assistance. The act empowered the provincial governor to nominate four non-English Indian members to the council for the first time. Under the act, the nominated members were allowed to move their own bills and vote on bills introduced in the council. However, they were not allowed to question the executive, move resolutions or examine the budget. Also they could not interfere with the laws passed by the Central Legislature. The governor was also the president of the council and he had complete authority over when, where and how long to convene the council and what to discuss. Two members of his Executive Council and the Advocate-General of Madras were also allowed to participate and vote in the council. The Indians nominated under this act were mostly zamindars and ryotwari landowners, who often benefited from their association with the colonial government. Supportive members were often re-nominated for several terms. G. N. Ganapathy Rao was nominated eight times, Humayun Jah Bahadur was a member for 23 years, T. Rama Rao and P. Chentsal Rao were members for six years each. Other prominent members during the period included V. Bhashyam Aiyengar, S. Subramania Iyer and C. Sankaran Nair. The council met infrequently and in some years (1874 and 1892) was not convened even once. The maximum of number of times it met in a year was eighteen. The governor preferred to convene the council at his summer retreat Udhagamandalam, much to the displeasure of the Indian members. The few times when the council met, it was for only a few hours with bills and resolutions being rushed through.

=== Expansion ===
Council meetings during 1891-1909
Years	No of Days
1906	2
1897,1901	3
1894,1907	4
1896,1898,1909	5
1899, 1902, 1903, 1904	6
1900	7
1895,1905	8
1893	9

In 1892, the role of the Council was expanded by the Indian Councils Act 1892. The act increased the number of additional members of the council to a maximum of 20, of whom not more than nine had to be officials. The act introduced the method of election for the council, but did not mention word "election" explicitly. The elected members were officially called as "nominated" members and their method of election was described as "recommendation". Such "recommendations" were made by district boards, universities, municipalities and other associations. The term of the members was fixed at two years. The council could also discuss the annual financial statement and ask questions subject to certain limitations. Thirty eight Indian members were "nominated" in the eight elections during 1893-1909 when this Act was in effect. C. Jambulingam Mudaliar, N. Subba Rao Pantulu, P. Kesava Pillai and C. Vijayaraghavachariar representing southern group of district boards, Kruthiventi Perraju Pantulu of the northern group of municipalities, C. Sankaran Nair and P. Rangaiah Naidu from the Corporation of Madras and P. S. Sivaswami Iyer, V. Krishnaswamy Iyer and M. Krishnan Nair from the University of Madras were some of the active members. However, over a period of time, representation by Indian members dwindled, for example, the position of Bashyam Iyengar and Sankaran Nayar in 1902 was occupied by Acworth and Sir George Moore. The council did not meet more than nine days in a year during the time the act was in effect.

=== Further expansion ===
Constituencies that elected members (1909–19)
Constituency	No of Members
District boards and Municipalities	10
University of Madras	1
South India Chamber of Commerce	1
Madras Traders Association	1
Zamindars	2
Large landholders	3
Muslims	2
Planters	1

The Indian Councils Act 1909 (popularly called as "Minto-Morley Reforms"), officially introduced the method of electing members to the Council. But it did not provide for direct election of the members. It abolished automatic official (executive) majorities in the Council and gave its members the power to move resolutions upon matters of general public interest and the budget and also to ask supplementary questions. There were a total of 21 elected members and 21 nominated members. The Act allowed up to 16 nominated members to be official and the remaining five were required to be non-officials. The Governor was also authorised to nominate two experts whenever necessary. As before, the Governor, his two executive council members and the Advocate-General were also members of the Council. P. Kesava Pillai, A. S. Krishna Rao, N. Krishnaswami Iyengar, B. N. Sarma, B. V. Narasimha Iyer, K. Perraju Pantulu, T. V. Seshagiri Iyer, P. Siva Rao, V. S. Srinivasa Sastri, P. Theagaraya Chetty and Yakub Hasan Sait were among the active members.

=== Diarchy (1920–37) ===
Based on the recommendations of the Montague-Chelmsford report, the Government of India Act 1919 was enacted. The act enlarged the provincial legislative councils and increased the strength of elected members to be greater than that of nominated and official members. It introduced a system of dyarchy in the Provinces. Although this act brought about representative government in India, the Governor was empowered with overriding powers. It classified the subjects as belonging to either the Centre or the Provinces. The Governor General could override any law passed by the Provincial councils. It brought about the concept of "Partial Responsible Government" in the provinces. Provincial subjects were divided into two categories - reserved and transferred. Education, Sanitation, Local self-government, Agriculture and Industries were listed as the transferred subjects. Law, Finance, Revenue and Home affairs were the reserved subjects. The provincial council could decide the budget in so far it related to the transferred subjects. Executive machinery dealing with those subjects was placed under the direct control of provincial legislature. However, the provincial legislature and the ministers did not have any control over the reserved subjects, which came under the governor and his executive council.

Councils under dyarchy
Council	Term
First	17 December 1920 – 11 September 1923
Second	26 November 1923 – 7 November 1926
Third	November 1926 - October 1930
Fourth	October 1930 - November 1934
Fifth	November 1934 - January 1937

The council had a total of 127 members in addition to the ex-officio members of the Governor's Executive Council. Out of the 127, 98 were elected from 61 constituencies of the presidency. The constituencies comprised three arbitrary divisions:

1. communal constituencies such as non-Muhammadan urban, non-Muhammadan rural, non-Brahman urban, Mohamaddan urban, Mohamaddan rural, Indian Christian, European and Anglo-Indian
2. special constituencies such as landholders, Universities, planters and trade associations (South India Chamber of Commerce & Nattukottai Nagarathar Association) and
3. territorial constituencies.

28 of the constituencies were reserved for non-Brahmans. 29 members were nominated, out of whom a maximum of 19 would be government officials, 5 would represent the Paraiyar, Pallar, Valluvar, Mala, Madiga, Sakkiliar, Thottiyar, Cheruman and Holeya communities and 1 would represent the "backward tracts". Including the Executive Council members, the total strength of the legislature was 134.

The first election for the Madras Legislative Council, under this act was held in November 1920. The first sitting of the council was inaugurated by the Duke of Connaught on 12 January 1921. In total, five such councils were constituted (in 1920, 23, 26, 30 and 34). The term of the councils was three years (except for the fourth council which was extended for a year in expectation of abolition of dyarchy ). While the first, second and fourth councils were controlled by Justice Party majorities, the third Council was characterised by a fractured verdict and an independent ministry. The fifth council also saw a fractured verdict and a minority Justice government.

=== Provincial autonomy (1937–50) ===
Breakdown of seats
Group	Seats
General	35
Mohammadans (Muslims)	7
Indian Christians	3
Europeans	1
Nominated by Governor	8-10
Total	54-56

The Government of India Act of 1935 abolished dyarchy and ensured provincial autonomy. It created a bicameral legislature in the Madras province. The Legislature consisted of the Governor and two Legislative bodies - a Legislative Assembly and a Legislative Council. The Assembly consisted of 215 members, who were further classified into general members and reserved members representing special communities and interests. The Council consisted of a minimum of 54 and a maximum of 56 members. It was a permanent body not subject to dissolution by the Governor and one-third of its members retired every three years. 46 of its members were elected directly by the electorate while the Governor could nominate 8 to 10 members. Similar to the council, the electable members were further classified into general and reserved members. Specific number of seats were reserved (allocated) to various religious and ethnic groups. The Act provided for a limited adult franchise based on property qualifications. Seven million people, roughly 15% of the Madras people holding land or paying urban taxes were qualified to be the electorate. Under this Act, two councils were constituted - the first in 1937 and the second in 1946. Both Councils were controlled by Congress majorities.

=== In Republic of India (1950–86) ===
After India became independent in 1947 and the Indian Constitution was adopted in 1950, the Legislative Council continued to be the upper chamber of the legislature of the Madras State - the successor to Madras Presidency. It continued to be called as the "Madras Legislative Council". The Council was a permanent body and was not subject to dissolution. The length of a member's term was six years and one-third of the members retired every two years. The strength of the Council was not less than 40 or more than one-third of the strength of the Assembly. The following table illustrates how the members of Council were selected:

Proportion	Method of Selection
One-sixth (1/6th)	Nominated by the Governor on the advice of the cabinet. They were supposed to have excelled in fields like arts, science, literature, cooperative movement or social service
One-third (1/3rd)	Elected by the members of the Legislative Assembly by proportional representation using the Single Transferable Vote System
One-third (1/3rd)	Elected by the members of local self governmental bodies like corporations, municipalities and district boards.
One-twelfth (1/12th)	Elected by an electorate consisting of electors who have held Graduate degrees for a minimum of three years
One-twelfth (1/12th)	Elected by an electorate consisting of teachers of secondary schools, colleges and universities with a minimum experience of three years

The actual strength of the council varied from time to time. During 1952–53, it had a strength of 72. After the formation of Andhra state on 1 October 1953, its strength came down to 51. In 1956 it decreased to 50 and the next year increased again to 63 - where it remained till the council's abolition. Of those 63, local bodies and the assembly elected 21 each, the teachers and graduates elected 6 each and the remaining 9 were nominated. The Council could not pass legislation on its own - it had to approve or disapprove the laws passed by the Assembly. In case of conflict between the Council and the Assembly, the will of the later would prevail. When Madras state was renamed as Tamil Nadu in 1968, the name of the council also changed to "Tamil Nadu Legislative Council".

== Abolition ==
The legislative council was abolished in 1986 by the All India Anna Dravida Munnetra Kazhagam (AIADMK) government of M. G. Ramachandran (MGR). MGR had nominated a Tamil film actress, Vennira Aadai Nirmala (aka A. B. Shanthi) to the Council. Her swearing in ceremony was scheduled for 23 April 1986. Nirmala had earlier declared insolvency and according to Article 102-(1)(c) of the Indian Constitution, an insolvent person can not serve as a member of parliament or state legislature. On 21 April, a lawyer named S. K. Sundaram, filed a public interest writ petition in the Madras High Court challenging Nirmala's nomination to the Council. MGR loaned Nirmala a sum of Rupees 4,65,000 from ADMK's party funds to pay off her creditors, so that her insolvency declaration could be annulled. The same day, Nirmala's lawyer Subramaniam Pichai, was able to persuade judge Ramalingam to set aside her insolvency. He used a provision in the Section 31 of The Presidency Towns Insolvency Act of 1909, which allowed a judge to annul an insolvency retrospectively if all debts had been paid in full. This annulment made Nirmala's nomination valid and the writ petition against it was dismissed. However, Nirmala withdrew her nomination to the council. The Governor of Tamil Nadu, Sundar Lal Khurana asked MGR to explain how Nirmala's nomination was proposed without proper vetting. This incident caused an embarrassment to MGR. Then a rumor arose that President of the main opposition party and former Chief minister M Karunanidhi, who was not an MLA at that time, planned to enter the legislative council, and trouble the Chief minister from both Houses in the Legislature, as the Chief Minister was a member of the Lower House. Following such unwanted events and miffed with rumors, MGR decided to abolish the council once for all.

On 14 May, a resolution seeking to abolish the council was moved successfully in the legislative assembly. The Tamil Nadu Legislative Council (Abolition) Bill, 1986 was passed by both houses of the Parliament and received the assent of the president on 30 August 1986. The Act came into force on 1 November 1986 and the council was abolished.

== Revival attempt ==
The Dravida Munnetra Kazhagam (DMK) has so far made three unsuccessful attempts to revive the council. Revival of the Legislative Council was one of the promises included in the election manifesto of Dravida Munnetra Kazhagam (DMK) in the 2006 Assembly elections. The DMK won the 2006 assembly election and M. Karunanidhi became Chief minister. In his inaugural address to the 13th Legislative Assembly delivered on 24 May 2006, Governor Surjit Singh Barnala said steps will be taken to move the necessary constitutional amendments for reviving the council. On 12 April 2010, the Legislative Assembly passed a resolution seeking to revive the Council. The DMK's earlier attempts to revive the council, when it was in power during 1989–91 and 1996-2001 were not successful, as it did not possess both the two-thirds majority in the Legislative Assembly and a friendly union government necessary for it to be done. On both occasions, the ADMK governments that followed the DMK governments passed counter resolutions to rescind them (in October 1991 and July 2001 respectively). The Tamil Nadu Legislative Council Bill, 2010 was approved by the Indian cabinet on 4 May 2010 and was passed by both the houses of the Indian Parliament on 5th and 6th of May, 2010. The Tamil Nadu Legislative Council Act, 2010 received the assent of President on 18 May 2010 and published on the same day. Accordingly, Constituencies for the new house were identified in September 2010. Work on preparation of electoral rolls for them began in October 2010 and was completed by January 2011. However, in February 2011, the Supreme Court of India stayed the elections to the new council, till the petitions challenging its revival could be heard.

In the 2011 Assembly elections, the AIADMK came out with a sweeping majority. The AIADMK government headed by J.Jayalalithaa expressed its intention not to revive the council. The government once again passed a counter resolution to withdraw the attempt to revive the council.

As on now, despite the fact that there is a specific provision of a Legislative Council in Tamil Nadu in Article 168 of Constitution of India, there is no Legislative Council in Tamil Nadu for want of a resolution by the Tamil Nadu Legislative Assembly by majority as provided in Article 169 of Constitution of India.

== Location ==
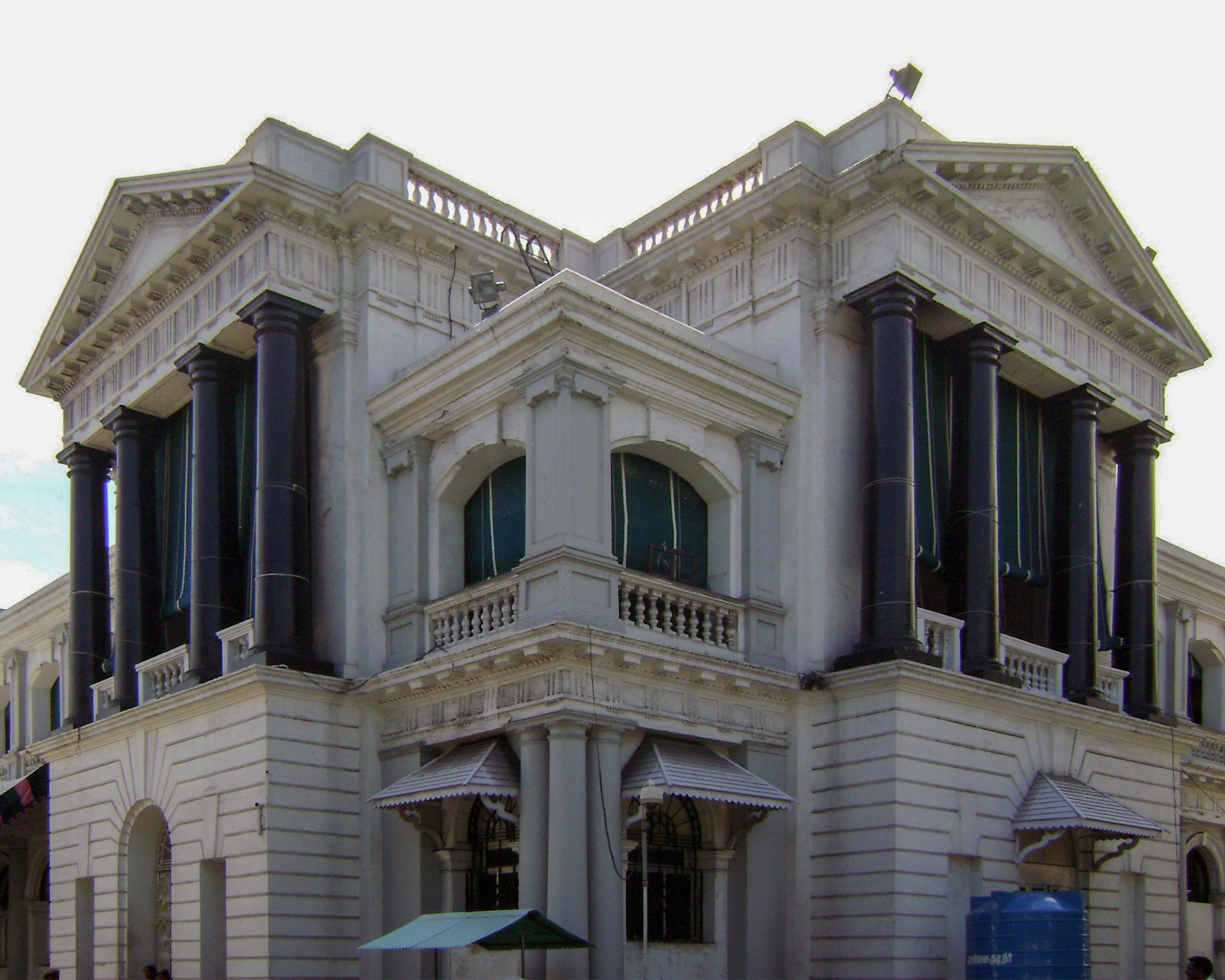
Fort St. George where the Tamil Nadu Legislature functioned for 60 years

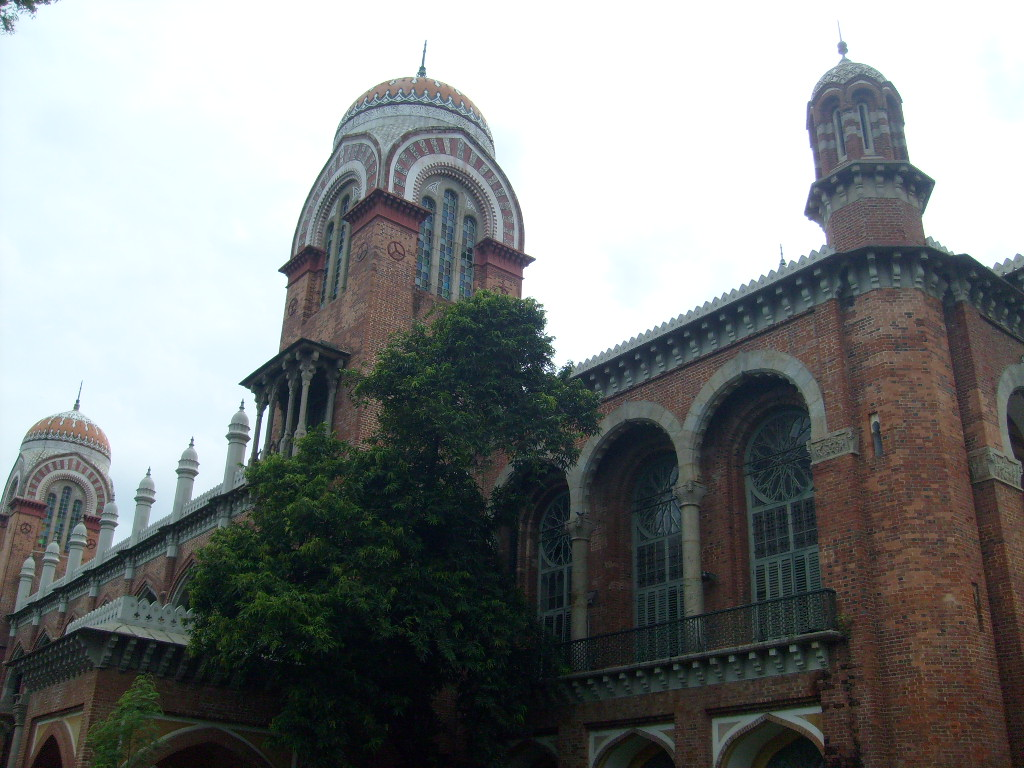
Senate House, Madras University

Fort St. George has historically been the seat of the Government of Tamil Nadu since colonial times. During 1921–37, the Madras Legislative Council met at the council chambers within the fort. Between 14 July 1937 – 21 December 1938, the assembly met at the Senate House of the University of Madras and between 27 January 1938 - 26 October 1939 in the Banqueting Hall (later renamed as Rajaji Hall) in the Government Estate complex at Mount Road. During 1946–52, it moved back to the Fort St. George. In 1952, the strength of the assembly rose to 375, after the constitution of the first legislative assembly, and it was briefly moved into temporary premises at the government estate complex. This move was made in March 1952, as the existing assembly building only had a seating capacity of 260. Then on 3 May 1952, it moved into the newly constructed assembly building in the same complex. The legislature functioned from the new building (later renamed as Kalaivanar Arangam during 1952–56. However, with the reorganisation of states and formation of Andhra, the strength came down to 190 and the legislature moved back to Fort St. George in 1956. From December 1956 till January 2010, the Fort remained the home to the legislature . In 2004, during the 12th assembly, the AIADMK Government under J. Jayalalithaa made unsuccessful attempts to shift the assembly (the council had been abolished by then), first to the location of Queen Mary's College and later to the Anna University campus, Guindy. Both attempts were withdrawn after public opposition. During the 13th Assembly, the DMK government led by M. Karunanidhi proposed a new plan to shift the assembly and the government secretariat to the a new building in the Omandurar Government Estate. In 2007, the German architectural firm GMP International won the design competition to design and construct the new assembly complex. Construction began in 2008 and was completed in 2010. The assembly functioned in the new assembly building during March 2010 - May 2011. In May 2011, the Tamil Nadu legislature was moved back to Fort St. George.

List of historical locations where the Tamil Nadu Legislative Council has been housed:

Duration	Location
1921–1937	Council chambers, Fort St. George
14 July 1937 – 21 December 1938	Senate House, Madras University Campus, Chepauk
27 January 1938 – 26 October 1939	Banqueting Hall (Rajaji Hall), Government Estate (Omandurar Estate), Mount Road
24 May 1946 – 27 March 1952	Council chambers, Fort St. George
3 May 1952 – 27 December 1956	Kalaivanar Arangam, Government Estate (Omandurar Estate)
29 April 1957 – 30 March 1959	Assembly Hall, Fort St. George
20–30 April 1959	Aranmore Palace, Udhagamandalam (Ooty)
31 August 1959 - 1 November 1986	Assembly Hall, Fort St. George

== Chief Ministers from the Council ==
During its existence as the upper chamber of Tamil Nadu Legislature, the Council has been used twice to appoint non-members of the Legislature as Chief Minister. In 1952, C. Rajagopalachari (Rajaji) was nominated by Governor Sri Prakasa to the Council so that Rajaji could become chief minister. The third time was in 1967 when C. N. Annadurai became the chief minister first and then got himself elected to the Council.

== Presiding Officers ==
During 1861–1937, the presiding officer of the Madras Legislative Council was known as the "President of the Council". From its establishment in 1861 till dyarchy was introduced in 1921, the Governor of Madras was also the President of the Council. After dyarchy introduced, the first and second council presidents, Perungavalur Rajagopalachari and L. D. Swamikannu Pillai, were appointed by the Governor himself. The presidents who came after them were chosen by the Council itself. During 1937–86, the presiding officer was called as the "Chairman of the Council". The following table lists the presiding officers of the Council.

Chairman of Tamil Nadu Legislative Council
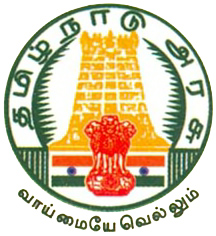
- Emblem of Tamil Nadu

- Flag of India

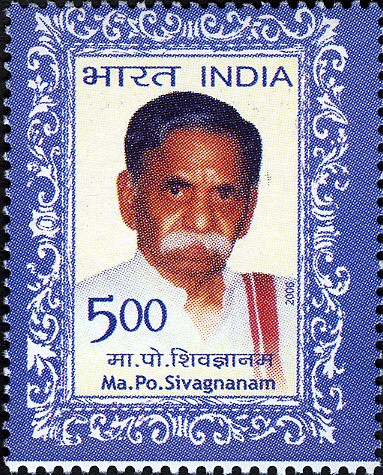
- Last in office M. P. Sivagnanam; 1976 – 1 November 1986
- Status: Abolished
- Appointer: Governor of Tamil Nadu
- Term length: Six years
- Inaugural holder: William Denison
- Formation: 18 February 1861
- Final holder: M. P. Sivagnanam
- Abolished: 1 November 1986
- Website: www.tn.gov.in

#	Name	Took office	Left office	Political party
Governors of Madras (1861–1920)
1	William Thomas Denison	18 February 1861	26 November 1863	
2	Edward Maltby (acting)	26 November 1863	18 January 1864	
3	William Thomas Denison	18 January 1864	27 March 1866	
4	Lord Napier	27 March 1866	19 February 1872	
5	Alexander John Arbuthnot (acting)	19 February 1872	15 May 1872	
6	Lord Hobart	15 May 1872	29 April 1875	
7	William Rose Robinson (acting)	29 April 1875	23 November 1875	
8	Duke of Buckingham and Chandos	23 November 1875	20 December 1880	
9	William Huddleston (acting)	24 May 1881	5 November 1881	
10	Mountstuart Elphinstone Grant Duff	5 November 1881	8 December 1886	
11	Robert Bourke, Baron Connemara	8 December 1886	1 December 1890	
12	John Henry Garstin	1 December 1890	23 January 1891	
13	Bentley Lawley, Baron Wenlock	23 January 1891	18 March 1896	
14	Arthur Elibank Havelock	18 March 1896	28 December 1900	
15	Arthur Oliver Villiers-Russell, Baron Ampthill	28 December 1900	30 April 1904	
16	James Thompson (acting)	30 April 1904	13 December 1904	
17	Arthur Oliver Villiers-Russell, Baron Ampthill	13 December 1904	15 February 1906	
18	Gabriel Stoles (acting)	15 February 1906	28 March 1906	
19	Arthur Lawley, Baron Wenlock	28 March 1906	3 November 1911	
20	Thomas David Gibson-Carmichael, Baron Carmichael	3 November 1911	30 March 1912	
21	Sir Murray Hammick (acting)	30 March 1912	30 October 1912	
22	John Sinclair, Baron Pentland	30 October 1912	29 March 1919	
23	Sir Alexander Gordon Cardew	29 March 1919	10 April 1919	
24	George Freeman Freeman-Thomas, Baron Willingdon	10 April 1919	12 April 1924	
During dyarchy (1920–1937)
1	Sir P. Rajagopalachari	1920	1923	Non-Partisan
2	L. D. Swamikannu Pillai	1923	September 1925	Justice Party
3	M. Ruthnaswamy	September 1925	1926	
4	C. V. S. Narasimha Raju	1926	1930	Swaraj Party
5	B. Ramachandra Reddi	1930	1937	Justice Party
During Provincial Autonomy (1937–1946)
1	U. Rama Rao	1937	1945	Indian National Congress
In Republic of India (1950–1986)
1	R. B. Ramakrishna Raju	1946	1952	Indian National Congress
2	P. V. Cherian	1952	20 April 1964	Indian National Congress
3	M. A. Manickavelu Naicker	1964	1970	Indian National Congress
4	C. P. Chitrarasu	1970	1976	Dravida Munnetra Kazhagam
5	M. P. Sivagnanam	1976	1986	Tamil Arasu Kazhagam

== See also ==
- Tamil Nadu Legislative Assembly
- List of chief ministers of Tamil Nadu
- Governors of Madras
- List of speakers of the Tamil Nadu Legislative Assembly
