= List of knights commander of the Order of the Star of India =

This is a list of knights commander of the Most Exalted Order of the Star of India from 1867 until 1947, when the order ceased to be awarded. It was the second highest class of the Order of the Star of India, following on from the highest class of Knight Grand Commander. Recipients used the post-nominal initials "KCSI" and prefixed "sir" to their forenames. Wives of knights commanders could prefix "lady" to their surnames. Such forms were not used by peers and Indian princes, except when the names of the former were written out in their fullest forms.

== 1860s ==
=== 1867 ===
- Daniel Eliott, Madras Civil Service (Retired), late Member of the Law Commission, of the Legislative Council of India, and of the Council of the Governor of Madras
- George Frederick Harvey, Bengal Civil Service (Retired), late Commissioner of Agra
- Major-General William Hill, late Madras Army, Commanding the Nizam's Contingent during the mutinies of 1857-1858
- Major-General Vincent Eyre, CB, Royal (late Bengal) Artillery
- The Rajah Jodhbir Chund of Nadown
- Henry Lacon Anderson, Bombay Civil Service (Retired), late Chief Secretary to the Government of Bombay, and Member of the Council of the Governor-General of India for making Laws and Regulations
- Richard Temple, CSI, Bengal Civil Service, Resident at Hyderabad
- Colonel Arthur Purves Phayre, CB, Bengal Staff Corps, Chief Commissioner in British Burmah

=== 1869 ===
- His Highness the Rajah of Cochin
- Lieutenant-General John Campbell, CB, Madras Army
- Major-General George Le Grand Jacob, CB, late Bombay Army

== 1870s ==
=== 1870 ===
- His Highness Prince Gholam Mahomed
- William Grey, Bengal Civil Service, Lieutenant-Governor of Bengal

=== 1871 ===
- The Nawab Mohsin-ood-Dowlah Bahadoor of Oude
- His Highness Mohubut Khan, Nawab of Joonaghur
- Major-General George Inglis Jameson, Bombay Army, late President of the Military Finance Commission for India, Auditor of the Accounts of the Department of the Secretary of State for India in Council
- John William Kaye, formerly of the Bengal Artillery, now Secretary in the Political and Secret Department of the Office of the Secretary of State for India in Council
- Henry Sumner Maine, late Member of the Council of the Governor-General of India

=== 1872 ===
- John Strachey, Bengal Civil Service, Member of the Council of the Governor-General of India
- John Cracroft Wilson CB Bengal Civi Service (Retired), late Civil and Sessions Judge at Moradabad, and Special Commissioner for the Trial of Rebels and Mutineers in 1857-58

=== 1873 ===
- Nawab Khan Bahadoor Khwajah Muhammad Khan Khuttuk, of Kohat
- George Campbell, Bengal Civil Service, Lieutenant-Governor of Bengal
- Alexander John Arbuthnot CSI, Madras Civil Service, late Member of the Council of the Governor of Madras
- Major-General Harry Burnett Lumsden CB Bengal Staff Corps, late Envoy to Candahar

=== 1874 ===
- Robert Henry Davies CSI, Bengal Civil Service, Lieutenant-Governor of the Punjab
- Colonel Richard John Meade CSI, Bengal Staff Corps, Chief Commissioner of Mysore and Coorg
- Colonel Lewis Pelly CSI, Bombay Staff Corps, Agent to the Governor-General for the States of Rajpootana, and late Political Resident in the Persian Gulf
- Maharaja Chandrakirti Singh, King Of The Ningthouja Dynasty and kingdom of Manipur

=== 1877 ===
- Joseph Dalton Hooker CB Director of the Royal Botanical Gardens at Kew
- Thomas Lawrence Seccombe CB Financial Secretary to the Secretary of State for India in Council

=== 1878 ===
- The Honourable Ashley Eden CSI, Lieutenant-Governor of Bengal
- Stuart Colvin Bayley CSI, Bengal Civil Service, Secretary to the Government of Bengal in the Judicial and Political Departments

== 1880s ==
=== 1881 ===
- General Orfeur Cavenagh, Bengal Staff Corps
- Charles Umpherston Aitchison, CSI, Bengal Civil Service, Chief Commissioner British Burmah
- His Highness Tukht Singh, Thakur Saheb of Bhavnagur
- James Davidson Gordon, CSI, Bengal Civil Service, Resident at Mysore
- John Forsyth, CB Inspector-General of Hospitals (Retired), Bengal Medical Service
- Lepel Henry Griffin CSI, Bengal Civil Service, Agent to the Governor-General in Central India

=== 1882 ===
- The Maharajah Jotendro Mohun Tagore CSI
- Lieutenant-Colonel Oliver Beauchamp Coventry St. John, CSI, Royal (late Bengal) Engineers, late Resident at Kandahar

=== 1885 ===
- Colonel Edward Ridley Colborne Bradford, CSI, Madras Staff Corps, Agent to the Governor-General

=== 1886 ===
- Theodore Cracraft Hope, Esq., CSI, CIE, Bombay Civil Service, Member of the Council of the Governor-General of India
- Charles Edward Bernard, Esq., CSI, Bengal Civil Service, Chief Commissioner of Burmah
- Nawab Khwaja Abdul Ghani Meeah, of Dacca, CSI
- William Chichele Plowden, Esq., Bengal Civil Service (Retired), late Census Commissioner for India

=== 1888 ===
- James Broadwood Lyall, Bengal Civil Service, Lt.-Governor of the Punjab
- Charles Hawkes Todd Crosthwaite, CSI, Bengal Civil Service, Chief Commissioner, Burmah

=== 1889 ===
- Colonel Henry Yule, CB, Royal (late Bengal) Engineers, Member of the Council of the Secretary of State for India

== 1890s ==
=== 1890 ===
- Andrew Richard Scoble, CSI, Ordinary Member of the Council of the Governor-General of India
- Dennis Fitzpatrick, CSI, Bengal Civil Service, Resident at Hyderabad

=== 1891 ===
- Philip Perceval Hutchins, CSI, Madras Civil Service, Member of the Council of the Governor-General of India
- Alexander Mackenzie, Esq., CSI, Bengal Civil Service, Chief Commissioner of Burma

=== 1892 ===
- Sir Auckland Colvin, KCMG CIE Bengal Civil Service, Lieutenant Governor of the North-Western Provinces and Chief Commissioner of Oudh
- Henry Edward Stokes, CSI, Madras Civil Service, Member of the Council of the Governor of Madras
- His Excellency Maharaja Bir Shumsher Jang Bahadur Rana, Prime Minister of Nepal
- Maharaja Mana Vikrama Bahadur Zamorin of Calicut

=== 1893 ===
- Anthony Patrick MacDonnell, CSI, Indian Civil Service, Chief Commissioner of the Central Provinces
- Kumarapuram Sheshadri Aiyar, CSI, Dewan of Mysore

=== 1894 ===
- Major General Oliver Richardson Newmarch, CSI, Military Secretary at the India Office
- Sir Henry Mortimer Durand, KCIE CSI, Secretary to the Government of India in the Foreign Department

=== 1895 ===
- Lieutenant-General Sir William Stephen Alexander Lockhart, KCB CSI
- James Westland, Esq, CSI, Member of the Council of the Governor-General of India
- Frederick William Richards Fryer, Esq, CSI, Officiating Financial Commissioner, Punjab
- His Highness Maharao Kesri Singh of Sirohi
- Courtenay Peregrine Ilbert, Esq, CSI, CIE

=== 1896 ===
- William Erskine Ward, CSI, Chief Commissioner of Assam
- Brigade-Surgeon-Lieutenant-Colonel Alfred Swaine Lethbridge, CSI
- Lieutenant-General Sir Henry Brackenbury, RA KCB, Member of the Council of the Governor-General of India
- Mansinghji Sarsinghji Thakore Saheb of Palitana

=== 1897 ===
- John Woodburn, Esq., CSI, Member of the Council of the Governor-General of India
- His Highness Maharao Raja Raghubir Singh Bahadur, Chief of Bundi
- Sir Edward Charles Buck, CSI, Secretary to the Government of India in the Department of Revenue and Agriculture
- William Mackworth Young CSI, Lieutenant-Governor of the Punjab
- Sri Raja Rama Varma of Cochin
- Charles James Lyall CSI CIE, Chief Commissioner of the Central Provinces
- Robert Joseph Crosthwaite CSI, Agent to the Governor-General in Rajputana
- William John Cuningham CSI, Secretary to the Government of India in the Foreign Department
- Major-General Montagu Gilbert Gerard CB CSI, Indian Staff Corps
- His Highness Raja Sir Tassaduq Rasul Khan, CSI, of Jahangirabad Raj, United Provinces, Oudh
- Raja Jagatjit Singh Bahadur of Kapurthala
- Richard Udny CSI, Indian Civil Service
- Colonel Howard Melliss CSI, Inspector-General of Imperial Service Troops

=== 1898 ===
- William Lee-Warner, Esq., CSI, Political Secretary, India Office
- Trevor John Chichele Chichele-Plowden, Esq., CSI, Indian Civil Service
- His Highness Maharaja Lokindra Bhawani Singh Bahadur of Datia
- Arthur Charles Trevor, CSI, Indian Civil Service
- John Frederick Price, Esq, CSI, Indian Civil Service

=== 1899 ===
- His Highness Rasul Khanji Mahabat Khanji, Nawab of Junagarh
- Charles Cecil Stevens, Esq., CSI, Indian Civil Service

== 1900s ==
=== 1901 ===
- James John Digges La Touche, Esq., CSI, Indian Civil Service
- His Highness Raja Surindar Bikram Prakash Bahadur, of Sirmur
- Sultan Ahmed bin Fadthl, of Lahej
- Charles Montgomery Rivaz, Esq., CSI, Ordinary Member of the Council of the Governor General of India

=== 1902 ===
- Lieutenant-Colonel David William Keith Barr, CSI, Indian Staff Corps, resident at Hyderabad
- Henry John Stedman Cotton, Esq., CSI, Indian Civil Service, Chief Commissioner of Assam
- Amaravati Seshayya Sastri, CSI, of Madras

=== 1903 ===
- Denzil Charles Jelf Ibbetson, Esq., CSI, Indian Civil Service, Member of the Council of the Governor-General of India
- Rear-Admiral Charles Carter Drury, Commander-in-Chief of His Majesty's Naval Forces in the East Indies
- Henry Martin Winterbotham, Esq, CSI, Indian Civil Service, Member of the Council of the Governor of Fort St. George
- James Monteath, Esq., CSI, Indian Civil Service, Member of the Council of the Governor of Bombay
- Lieutenant-Colonel Donald Robertson, CSI, Indian Staff Corps, Resident in Mysore, and Chief Commissioner of Coorg
- Andrew Henderson Leith Fraser, Esq., CSI, Indian Civil Service, Chief Commissioner of the Central Provinces
- Hugh Shakespear Barnes, Esq., CSI, Indian Civil Service, Secretary to the Government of India in the Foreign Department
- Surgeon-General William Roe Hooper, CSI, Indian Medical Service (retired), President of the Medical Board at the India Office
- Colonel Sir Colin Campbell Scott Moncrieff, KCMG, CSI, Royal Engineers (retired), President of the Indian Irrigation Commission
- His Highness Raja Kirti Sah, of Tehri, Garhwal, CSI
- Kunwar Ranbir Singh, of Patiala

=== 1904 ===
- Arundel Tagg Arundel, Esq., CSI, Indian Civil Service, an Ordinary Member of the Council of the Governor-General
- James Austin Bourdillon, Esq., CSI, Indian Civil Service, Resident in Mysore and Chief Commissioner of Coorg, lately Acting Lieutenant-Governor of Bengal

=== 1907 ===
- Thomas William Holderness, Esquire, CSI, Indian Civil Service (retired), Secretary in the Revenue and Statistics Department of the India Office
- Lancelot Hare, Esquire, CSI, CIE, Indian Civil Service, Lieutenant-Governor of Eastern Bengal and Assam

=== 1908 ===
- Charles Stuart Bayley, Esq., CSI, Indian Civil Service, Officiating Lieutenant-Governor, Eastern Bengal and Assam
- Edward Norman Baker, Esq., CSI, Indian Civil Service, Ordinary Member of the Council of the Governor-General
- His Highness Raj Rajeshwar Maharaja Dhiraj Sardar Singh Bahadur, of Jodhpur
- His Highness Raj Rana Bhavvaui Singh, of Jhalawar

=== 1909 ===
- John William Pitt Muir-Mackenzie, Esq., CSI, Indian Civil Service, an Ordinary Member of the Council of the Governor of Bombay
- Nawab Bahadur Khwaia Salimulla, CSI, of Dacca, an Additional Member of the Council of the Governor-General for making Laws and Regulations
- James Wilson, Esq., CSI, Indian Civil Service, Financial Commissioner, Punjab, and a Member of the Council of the Lieutenant-Governor of the Punjab for making Laws and Regulations
- His Highness Maharaja Sawai Jai Singh, Bahadur, of Alwar
- Henry Erle Richards, Esq., KC, Barrister-at-law, an Ordinary Member of the Council of the Governor-General
- Gabriel Stokes, Esq., CSI, Indian Civil Service (retired), lately an Ordinary Member of the Council of the Governor of Fort St. George
- His Highness Farzand-i-Dilband Rasikh-ul-Itikad Daulat-i-Inglishia Raja-i-Rajagan Raja Ranbir Singh, Bahadur of Jind
- His Highness Maharana Shri Ajitsinghji Jaswatsinghjii, Raj Sahib of Dhrangadhra
- George Stuart Forbes, Esq., CSI, Indian Civil Service, an Ordinary Member of the Council of the Governor of Fort St. George
- Captain His Highness Raja Sajjan Singh of Ratlam

== 1910s ==
=== 1910 ===
- Sir James Lyle Mackay, GCMG, KCIE, a Member of the Council of His Majesty's Secretary of State for India
- Sir Harvey Adamson, CSI, Indian Civil Service, an Ordinary Member of the Council of the Governor-General of India
- Lieutenant-General Sir Beauchamp Duff, KCB, KCVO, CIE, Indian Army, Secretary in the Military Department, India Office
- Ihtisham-ul-Mulk Rais-ud-Daula Amir-ul-Omrah Nawab Asif Kadr Saiyid Wasif Ali Mirza Khan Bahadur, Mahabat Jang, Nawab Bahadur of Murshidabad, Member of the Council of the Lieutenant-Governor of Bengal for making Laws and Regulations
- Lieutenant-Colonel James Robert Dunlop Smith, CSI, CIE, Indian Army, Private Secretary to His Excellency the Viceroy and Governor-General of India

=== 1911 ===
- John Ontario Miller, Esq., CSI, Indian Civil Service, lately an Ordinary Member of the Council of the Governor-General of India
- Lionel Montague Jacob, Esq., CSI, MICE, Secretary to the Government of India, Public Works Department, and an Additional Member of the Council of the Governor-General of India for making Laws and Regulations
- Murray Hammick, Esq., CSI, CIE, an Ordinary Member of the Council of the Governor of Fort St. George
- Krishna Govinda Gupta, CSI, Member of the Council of India
- Leslie Alexander Selim Porter, Esq., CSI, Indian Civil Service, Acting Lieutenant-Governor of the United Provinces of Agra and Oudh
- John Lewis Jenkins, Esq., CSI, Indian Civil Service, an Ordinary Member of the Council of the Governor-General of India
- Spencer Harcourt Butler, Esq., CSI, CIE, Indian Civil Service, an Ordinary Member of the Council of the Governor-General of India
- Robert Warrand Carlyle, Esq., CSI, CIE, Indian Civil Service, an Ordinary Member of the Council of the Governor-General of India
- Captain His Highness Umdae Rajahae Baland Makan Maharajadhiraja Sir Madan Singh Bahadur, KCIE, Maharaja of Kishangarh
- Reginald Henry Craddock, Esq., CSI, Indian Civil Service, Chief Commissioner, Central Provinces
- James McCrone Douie, Esq., CSI, Indian Civil Service, First Financial Commissioner of the Punjab, and an Additional Member of the Council of the Lieutenant-Governor of the Punjab for making Laws and Regulations
- James Scorgie Meston, Esq., CSI, Indian Civil Service, Secretary to the Government of India in the Finance Department, and an Additional Member of the Council of the Governor-General of India for making Laws and Regulations
- Benjamin Robertson, Esq., CSI, CIE, Indian Civil Service, Secretary to the Government of India, Commerce and Industry Department, and an Additional Member of the Council of the Governor-General of India for making Laws and Regulations
- Richard Amphlett Lamb, Esq., CSI, CIE, Indian Civil Service, an Ordinary Member and Vice-President of the Council of the Governor of Bombay
- Maharajadhiraja Sir Bijay Chand Mahtab Bahadur, KCIE, of Burdwan, a Member of the Council of the Lieutenant-Governor of Bengal for making Laws and Regulations
- Elliot Graham Colvin, Esq., CSI, Indian Civil Service, Agent to the Governor-General of India in Rajputana, and Chief Commissioner, Ajmer-Merwara
- Sir Trevredyn Rashleigh Wynne, KCIE, VD, Chairman of the Railway Board and an Additional Member of the Council of the Governor-General of India for making Laws and Regulations
- Surgeon-General Charles Pardey Lukis, CSI, MD, Indian Medical Service, Director-General, Indian Medical Service, and an Additional Member of the Council of the Governor-General of India for making Laws and Regulations
- Stanley Ismay, Esq., CSI, Indian Civil Service (retired), Chief Justice of the Chief Court of Mysore
- George Casson Walker, Esq., CSI, Indian Civil Service (retired), lately Financial Adviser to the Government of the Nizam of Hyderabad
- Apcar Alexander Apcar, Esq., CSI, Consul for Siam in Calcutta
- His Highness Raja Udaji Rao Puar, Raja of Dhar, in Central India
- His Highness Raja Tukoji Rao Puar of Dewas State (Senior Branch), in Central India
- Surgeon-General Francis Wollaston Trevor, CB, MB, KHS, Principal Medical Officer, India
- His Highness Maharaja 5 Sris Sir Ugyen Wangchuk, KCIE, of Bhutan

=== 1912 ===
- John Nathaniel Atkinson, CSI, Indian Civil Service, an Ordinary Member of the Council of the Governor of Fort St. George
- William Thomson Morison, CSI, Indian Civil Service (Retd.), lately an Ordinary Member of the Council of the Governor of Bombay

=== 1913 ===
- Michael Francis O'Dwyer, Esq., CSI, Indian Civil Service, Lieutenant-Governor of the Punjab
- Lieutenant-Colonel Sir George Olaf Roos-Keppel, KCIE, Chief Commissioner and Agent to the Governor-General of India, North-West Frontier Province
- Sir George Head Barclay, KCMG, CVO, lately Envoy Extraordinary and Minister Plenipotentiary at Teheran
- Lieutenant-General Sir James Willcocks, KCMG, CB, DSO, General Officer Commanding the Northern Army in India

=== 1914 ===
- His Excellency Sardar Arfa, Amir Nuyan Sheikh Khazal Khan ibn Haji Jabir Khatij KCIE, Sheikh of Mohammera (Honorary)
- Sheikh Mubarak-bin-Subah, KCIE, Ruler of Koweit (Honorary)
- Michael William Fenton, Esq., CSI, Indian Civil Service, Financial Commissioner, Punjab
- Sir Harold Arthur Stuart, KCVO, CSI, Indian Civil Service, an Ordinary Member of the Council of the Governor of Fort St. George
- Colonel Sidney Gerald Burrard, CSI, FRS, RE, Surveyor-General in India
- Syed Ali Imam, Esq., CSI, an Ordinary Member of the Council of the Governor-General of India
- Duncan Colvin Baillie, Esq., CSI, Member of the Board of Revenue, United Provinces of Agra and Oudh

=== 1915 ===
- Pazhamaneri Sundaram Sivaswami Iyer CSI CIE, an Ordinary Member of the Council of the Governor of Fort St. George, Madras
- Sir Frederick William Duke KCIE CSI, Indian Civil Service (retired), a Member of the Council of India
- Edward Albert Gait CSI CIE Indian Civil Service, an Ordinary Member of the Council of the Lieutenant-Governor of Bihar and Orissa
- His Highness Nawab Ahmad Ali Khan Sherwani Bahadur, Chief of Maler Kotla, Punjab
- His Highness Raja Amar Prakash Bahadur, Chief of Sirmur (Nahan), Punjab
- Lieutenant-Colonel Alexander Fleetwood Pinhey CSI CIE, Indian Army, Indian Political Department, Resident, Hyderabad
- William Henry Clark CSI CMG, an Ordinary Member of the Council of the Governor-General
- Sir William Stevenson Meyer KCIE, Indian Civil Service, an Ordinary Member of the Council of the Governor-General
- Major-General William Riddell Birdwood, CB, CSI, CIE, DSO, late Secretary in the Army Department to the Government of India

=== 1916 ===
- Alexander Gordon Cardew CSI, Indian Civil Service, an Ordinary Member of the Council of the Governor of Fort St. George, Madras
- Lt.-Col. Sir Hugh Daly KCIE CSI, Indian Army, lately Resident in Mysore and Chief Commissioner, Coorg
- Sir Steyning William Edgerley, KCVO, CIE, Member of the Council of India
- Harrington Verney Lovett, Esq., CSI, Indian Civil Service, Commissioner of the Lucknow Division, United Provinces, and a Member of the Council of the Lieutenant-Governor for making Laws and Regulations
- Robert Woodburn Gillan, Esq., CSI, Indian Civil Service, President of the Railway Board
- Maharaj Sri Bhairon Singh Bahadur, CSI, Vice-President and Political Member of the State Council, Bikaner, Rajputana

=== 1917 ===
- Sir Charles Edmund Fox, Chief Judge, Chief Court, Lower Burma
- Claude Hamilton Archer Hill, CSI CIE, an Ordinary Member of the Council of the Governor-General
- His Highness Raja Malhar Rao Baba Saheb Puar, Chief of Dewas (Junior Branch), Central India
- His Highness Maharaja Jitendra Narayan Bhup Bahadur, of Cooch Behar, Bengal
- His Highness Jam Shri Ranjitsinhji Vibhaji, Jam Saheb of Nawanagar, Kathiawar, Bombay Presidency
- His Highness Maharaja Ghanshyamsinhji Ajitsinhji, Maharaja Saheb of Dhrangadhra, Kathiawar Bombay Presidency
- Lieutenant-Colonel Sir Francis Edward Younghusband, KCIE LLD DSc, Indian Political Department (retired)
- Sir Theodore Morison, KCIE, lately a Member of the Council of India
- Major-General George Macaulay Kirkpatrick, CB, Chief of the Indian General Staff
- Major-General Robert Charles Ochiltree Stuart, CSI, Director-General of Ordnance in India

=== 1918 ===
- Sir William Henry Hoare Vincent, Indian Civil Service, an Ordinary Member of the Council of the Governor-General of India
- Sir Thomas Henry Holland KCIE FRS President, Indian Munitions Board
- George Rivers Lowndes KC an Ordinary Member of the Council of the Governor-General of India
- His Highness Maharajadhiraja Maharawal Jawahir Singh Bahadur of Jaisalmer, Rajputana
- Sir Archdale Earle KCIE Indian Civil Service, Chief Comm. of Assam
- Stuart Mitford Fraser CSI CIE Indian Civil Service, Political Dept., Resident at Hyderabad
- John Stratheden Campbell CSI CIE Indian Civil Service, Junior Member, Board of Revenue, United Provinces of Agra and Oudh, and a Member of the Council of the Lieutenant-Governor for making Laws and Regulations
- Frank George Sly CSI, Indian Civil Service, Comm., Central Provinces
- His Highness Maharaja Lakendra Govind Singh Bahadur of Datia
- His Highness Maharajadhiraja Sri Sawai Maharaj Rana Udai Bhan Singh Lokindar Bahadur of Dholpur

=== 1919 ===
- Maj.-Gen. Sir Harry Triscott Brooking KCB KCMG
- Maj.-Gen. Sir George Fletcher MacMunn KCB CSI DSO Inspector-General of Communications
- Oswald Vivian Bosanquet CSI CIE Indian Civil Service, Agent to the Governor-General in Central India

== 1920s ==
=== 1920 ===
- Sir George Stapylton Barnes KCB Ordinary Member of the Governor-General's Executive Council
- Colonel Nawab Muhammad Nasrulla Khan, Heir-apparent to the Bhopal State, Central India
- The Right Honourable Sir Francis John Stephens Hopwood, Baron Southborough, GCB, GCMG
- Lieutenant-Colonel His Highness Maharaja Daolat Singhji, Maharaja of Idar, Bombay
- Diwan Bahadur Penungavur Rajagopala Achariyar Avargal, CIE, Member of the Council of His Excellency the Governor, Madras

=== 1921 ===
- Charles George Todhunter CSI, Indian Civil Service, Member of the Executive Council, Madras
- Sir Henry Wheeler KCIE CSI, Indian Civil Service, Member of the Executive Council, Bengal
- Sir Edward Douglas MacLagan, KCIE, CSI, Governor-Designate of the Punjab
- The Right Honourable Sir Satyendra Prassano, Baron Sinha of Raipur, KC, Governor of Bihar and Orissa
- Sir Nicholas Dodd Beatson-Bell, KCIE, CSI, Governor-Designate of Assam
- Sir William Sinclair Marris, KCIE, Governor-Designate of Assam (in succession to Sir Nicholas Beatson-Bell)
- Louis James Kershaw, CSI, CIE, Indian Civil Service, Secretary in the Revenue and Statistics Department, India Office
- George Seymour Curtis, CSI, Indian Civil Service, Member of the Executive Council of the Governor of Bombay
- Lionel Davidson, CSI, Indian Civil Service, Member of the Executive Council of the Governor of Madras

=== 1922 ===
- Captain His Highness Maharawal Shri Ranjitsinhji Mansinhji, Raja of Baria, Bombay
- Khan Bahadur Mian Muhammad Shafi, CIE, Barrister-at-Law, Member of the Viceroy's Council
- William Malcolm Hailey, CSI, CIE, Member of the Viceroy's Council
- Sir Alfred Hamilton Grant, KCIE, CSI, late Chief Commissioner and Agent to the Governor-General, North-West Frontier Province
- Raja Sir Muhammad Ali Muhammad Khan, Khan Bahadur KCIE CSI, of Mahmudabad, Member of the Governor's Executive Council, United Provinces
- Sir Jamsetjee Jejeebhoy Bt, Bombay
- Sir Sassoon Jacob David Bt President, Bombay Municipality
- Sir William Mitchell Acworth

=== 1923 ===
- Rao Bahadur Bayya Narasimheswara Sarma, Member of the Executive Council of the Governor-General
- Sir Ibrahim Rahimtoola, CIE, Member of the Executive Council, Bombay
- Tej Bahadur Sapru, LLD, Member of the Viceroy's Council
- Sir Ludovic Charles Porter, KCIE, CSI, OBE, Indian Civil Service, Member of Council, United Provinces
- Sir Richard Havelock Charles, GCVO, Medical Adviser to the Secretary of State for India

=== 1924 ===
- His Highness Maharajadhiraja Maharao Sarup Ram Singh Bahadur, Maharao of Sirohi, Rajputana
- Charles Alexander Innes, CSI, CIE, Indian Civil Service; Member of the Governor-General's Executive Council
- General Sir Claud William Jacob, KCB, KCMG, ADC-Gen., Chief of the General Staff, India

=== 1925 ===
- Major His Highness Raj Rajeshwar Maharajadhiraja Umaid Singh Bahadur KCVO Maharaja of Jodhpur, Rajputana
- Sir Alexander Frederick Whyte, President, Legislative Assembly
- Sir Maurice Henry Weston Hayward, Indian Civil Service, Member of the Executive Council, Bombay
- Sir Abdur Rahim, Member of the Executive Council, Bengal
- Captain His Highness Maharana Shri Vijayasinhji Chhatrasinhji, Maharaja of Rajpipla
- Sir Frederick Augustus Nicholson, KCIE, Indian Civil Service (retired), Madras

=== 1926 ===
- Sir Alexander Phillips Muddiman CSI CIE Indian Civil Service, Member of the Governor-General's Executive Council
- Lieutenant-Colonel His Highness Maharaja Sri Brajindra Sawai Kishan Singh Bahadur, Maharaja of Bharatpur
- His Highness Nawab Mahabat Khanji Rasul Khanji, Nawab of Junagadh
- Sir Basil Phillott Blackett, KCB, Member of the Executive Council of the Governor-General
- Henry Staveley Lawrence, CSI, Indian Civil Service, Member of the Executive Council, Bombay

=== 1927 ===
- Khan Bahadur Sir Muhammad Habibullah, Sahib Bahadur KCIE Member of the Governor-General's Executive Council
- His Highness Maharaja Gulab Singh Bahadur, Maharaja of Rewa, Central India

=== 1928 ===
- Sir William John Keith CIE Indian Civil Service, late Finance Member of the Executive Council of the Governor of Burma
- Sir Bhupendra Nath Mitra KCIE CBE Member of the Governor-General's Executive Council
- Sir Samuel Perry O'Donnell KCIE CSI, Indian Civil Service, Member of the Executive Council of the Governor of the United Provinces
- Sir Chunilal Vijbhukhandas Mehta, Member of the Executive Council of the Governor of Bombay

=== 1929 ===
- His Highness Maharaja Shri Natvarsinhji Bhavsinhji, Maharaja Rana Saheb of Porbandar, Bombay
- James Crerar, CSI, CIE, Indian Civil Service, Member of the Governor-General's Executive Council
- Jean Louis Rieu, CSI, Indian Civil Service, Member of the Executive Council of the Governor of Bombay
- George Bancroft Lambert, CSI, Indian Civil Service, Member of the Executive Council of the Governor of the United Provinces
- Captain His Highness Rukn-ud-Daula Nusrat-i-Jang Hafiz-ul-Mulk Mukhlis-ud, Daula Nawab Sir Sadiq Muhammad Khan, Abbasi, Bahadur Nawab of Bahawalpur

== 1930s ==
=== 1930 ===
- Sir George Rainy, KCIE, CSI, Indian Civil Service, Member of the Governor-General's Executive Council
- Sir Denys de Saumarez Bray, KCIE, CSI, CBE, Indian Civil Service (Retd.), lately Foreign Secretary to the Government of India
- John Ernest Buttery Hotson, CSI, CBE, Indian Civil Service, Member of the Executive Council of the Governor of Bombay
- His Highness Maharaja Shri Lakhdirji Waghji, Maharaja of Morvi

=== 1931 ===
- Sir George Ernest Schuster, KCMG, CBE, MC, Member of the Governor-General's Executive Council
- Lieutenant His Highness Raja Jogindar Sen Bahadur, Raja of Mandi, Punjab States
- Thakor Saheb Shri Sir Daulatsinhji Jasvatsinhji KCIE Thakor Saheb of Limbdi, Western India States
- Sir Norman Edward Marjoribanks KCIE CSI, Indian Civil Service (retired), Chairman, Madras Services Commission, Madras

=== 1932 ===
- Khan Bahadur Mian Sir Fazl-i-Hussain, KCIE, Member of the Governor-General's Executive Council
- Sir Brojendra Lal Mitter, Law Member of the Governor-General's Executive Council
- His Highness Maharaja Mahendra Sir Yadvendra Singh Bahadur KCIE Maharaja of Panna, Central India
- Major His Highness Raja Narendra Shah CSI, Raja of Tehri (Garhwal), United Provinces
- Sir John Perronet Thompson KCIE CSI, Chief Commissioner of Delhi
- Major-General Sir Leonard Rogers CIE Indian Medical Service (retired), President, India Office Medical Board

=== 1933 ===
- Captain His Highness Maharaja Aditya Narayan Singh Bahadur, Maharaja of Benares, United Provinces
- Khan Bahadur Shaikh Sir Ghulam Hussain Hidayatullah, Member and Vice-President of the Executive Council of the Governor of Bombay
- Sir Joseph William Bhore KCIE CBE Indian Civil Service, Member of the Governor-General's Executive Council
- Harry Graham Haig CSI CIE Indian Civil Service, Member of the Governor-General's Executive Council
- Captain Nawab Sir Muhammad Ahmad Said Khan KCIE MBE of Chhatari, Member of the Executive Council of the Governor of the United Provinces
- Sir Provash Chandra Mitter CIE Member of the Executive Council of the Governor of Bengal
- Sir Henry Duffield Craik Bt CSI, Indian Civil Service, Member of the Executive Council of the Governor of the Punjab
- Vice-Admiral Humphrey Thomas Walwyn CB DSO Flag Officer Commanding, and Director, Royal Indian Marine
- Sir Reginald Arthur Mant KCIE CSI, Member of the Council of India

=== 1934 ===
- Sir Frank Noyce, CSI, CBE, Indian Civil Service, Member of the Governor-General's Executive Council
- Major His Highness Raje Bahadur Shrimant Khem Savant Bhonsle, alias Bapu Saheb, Raja of Savantvadi, Deccan States Agency
- His Highness Maharaja Chura Chand Singh CBE Maharaja of Manipur, Assam
- Sir Edward Maynard Deschamps Chamier KCIE lately Legal Adviser and Solicitor to the Secretary of State for India

=== 1935 ===
- His Highness Rai-i-Rayan Maharawal Sri Lakshman Singh Bahadur, Maharawal of Dungarpur
- His Highness Maharaja Manikya Bir Bikram Kishore Deb Barman Bahadur, Maharaja of Tripura
- Captain His Highness Maharaja Shri Digvijaysinhji Ranjitsinhji Jadeja, Maharaja Jam Saheb of Nawanagar
- Robert Duncan Bell, Esq., CSI, CIE, Indian Civil Service, Member of the Executive Council of the Governor of Bombay
- Sir Maurice Linford Gwyer, KCB, KC, First Parliamentary Counsel
- His Highness Maharaja Bhom Pal Deo Bahadur Yadukul Chandra Bhal, Maharaja of Karauli, Rajputana
- His Highness Rai-i-Rayan Maharawal Sri Lakshman Singh Bahadur, Maharawal of Dungarpur
- His Highness Maharaja Manikya Bir Bikram Kishore Deb Barman Bahadur, Maharaja of Tripura
- Captain His Highness Maharaja Shri Digvijaysinhji Ranjitsinhji Jadeja, Maharaja Jam Saheb of Nawanagar
- Robert Duncan Bell, Esq., CSI, CIE, Indian Civil Service, Member of the Executive Council of the Governor of Bombay
- Sir Maurice Linford Gwyer, KCB, KC, First Parliamentary Counsel

=== 1936 ===
- Saramad-i-Rajaha-i-Bundelkhand Sawai Mahendra Maharaja Shri Vir Singh Deo Bahadur, Maharaja of Orchha, Central India
- Rana Bhagat Chand, CSI, Raja of Jubbal, Simla Hill States, Punjab
- Captain His Highness Ali Jah, Farzand-i-Dilpazir-i- Daulat-i-Inglishia, Mukhlis ud-Daula, Nasir ul-Mulk, Amir ul-Umara, Nawab Sayyid Muhammad Raza Ali Khan Bahadur, Mustaid Jang, Nawab of Rampur, United Provinces
- Sir Nripendra Nath Sircar, Member of the Governor-General's Executive Council
- Sir Percy James Grigg KCB Member of the Governor-General's Executive Council
- Captain His Highness Maharana Shri Sir Amarsinhji Banesinhji KCIE Maharana Raj Sahib of Wankaner, States of Western India
- Sir Reginald Isidore Robert Glancy KCIE CSI, Indian Civil Service (retired), Member of the Council of India
- Sir Maneckji Byramji Dadabhoy KCIE President of the Council of State
- General Sir Padma Shumshere Jung Bahadur Rana CBE KCIE Commander-in-Chief, Nepal

=== 1937 ===
- Sir Osborne Arkell Smith, KCIE Governor of the Reserve Bank of India
- Kanwar Sir Jagdish Prasad, CSI, CIE, OBE
- Sir Muhammad Zafarullah Khan
- Mir Sir Muhammad Nazim Khan, the Mir of Hunza, KCIE

=== 1938 ===
- His Highness Maharaja Shri Krishna Kumarsinhji Bhavsinhji, Maharaja of Bhavnagar, States of Western India
- His Highness Maharaj Rana Rajendra Singh Bahadur, Maharaj Rana of Jhalawar, Rajputana
- His Highness Maharawat Ram Singh Bahadur, Maharawat of Pratapgarh, Rajputana

=== 1939 ===
- His Highness Maharaja Sir Tashi Namgyal, KCIE, Maharaja of Sikkim
- Reginald Maitland Maxwell, CSI CIE Indian Civil Service, Member of the Governor-General's Executive Council
- Maharana Shri Bhavani Sinhji Bahadur, Maharana of Danta, Rajputana
- Thakor Saheb Shri Sir Bahadursinhji Mansinhji, KCIE Thakor Saheb of Palitana, States of Western India

== 1940s ==
=== 1941 ===
- His Highness Maharaja Vikramsinha Rao Puar, Maharaja of Dewas, Senior Branch, Central India
- Sir Andrew Gourlay Clow, CSI CIE, Indian Civil Service, Member of the Governor General's Executive Council
- Sir Abraham Jeremy Raisman, CSI CIE, Indian Civil Service, Member of the Governor General's Executive Council
- Lieutenant His Highness Raja Har Indar Singh Bahadur, Raja of Faridkot
- Sir Francis Lewis Castle Floud, KCB, KCMG, Chairman, Land Revenue Commission, Bengal
- Sir Chetput Pattabhirama Ayyar Ramaswami Ayyar, KCIE, Diwan, Travanoore State

=== 1942 ===
- Diwan Bahadur Sir Arcot Ramaswami Mudaliar, Member of the Governor-General's Executive Council

=== 1943 ===
- Lieutenant His Highness Maharaja Shri Sewai Tej Singhji Bahadur, Maharaja of Alwar
- Sir Girija Shankar Bajpai, KBE, CIE, Indian Civil Service, Agent-General for India in the United States of America
- Sir Thomas Guthrie Russell, KCIE, Director-General, Munitions Production, Department of Supply, Government of India
- Lieutenant-General Cyril Dupre Noyes, CB, CIE, MC, Indian Army, General Officer Commanding-in-Chief, North-Western Army

=== 1944 ===
- Henry Foley Knight, CSI, CIE, Indian Civil Service, Adviser to His Excellency the Governor of Bombay

=== 1945 ===
- The Honourable Sir Edward Charles Benthall, Member of the Governor-General's Executive Council
- The Honourable Khan Bahadur Sir Muhammad Usman Sahib Bahadur, KCIE, Member of the Governor-General's Executive Council

=== 1946 ===
- Captain His Highness Raja Shrimant Sir Chintamanrao Dhundirao alias Appasaheb Patwardhan, KCIE, Raja of Sangli
- The Honourable Sir Jwala Prasad Srivastava, KBE, Member of the Governor-General's Executive Council
- The Honourable Sardar Sir Jogendra Singh, Member of the Governor-General's Executive Council
- The Honourable Khan Bahadur Maulvi Sir Muhammad Azizul Haque, CIE, Member of the Governor-General's Executive Council
- Major-General (Local Lieutenant-General) Gordon Wilson, CB, CBE, MC, KHS, British Service (late RAMC), Director, Medical Services in India
- Major-General (Temporary Lieutenant-General) Alfred Reade Godwin-Austen, CB, OBE, MC, British Service, Principal Administrative Officer, General Headquarters, India
- Rao Bahadur Sir Vangal Thiruvenkata Krishnamachari, KCIE, lately Dewan, Baroda State
- Captain His Highness Farzand-i-Arjmand Aqidat Paiwand-i-Daulat-i-Inglishia Barar Bans Sarmur, Raja-i-Rajagan, Maharaja Pratap Singh Malvendra Baha-Dur, Maharaja of Nabha
- Lieutenant-Colonel Nawab Malik Khizar Hayat Khan Tiwana, OBE, Premier of the Punjab
- Sir Geoffrey Pownall Burton, KCIE, Indian Civil Service, Financial Adviser to His Excellency the Governor of the Central Provinces and Berar

=== 1947 ===
- Lieutenant-General Sir Frank Walter Messervy, KBE, CB, DSO, Indian Army, General Officer Commanding-in-Chief, Northern Command, India
- Sir George Hemming Spence, KCIE, CSI, Indian Civil Service, Secretary to the Government of India in the Legislative Department

=== 1948 ===
- Colonel His Highness Maharao Bhim Singhji Bahadur, Maharao of Kotah
- Sir David Taylor Monteath, KCB, KCMG, CVO, OBE, lately His Majesty's Under-Secretary of State for India
- Vice-Admiral Sir Geoffrey John Audley Miles, KCB, Royal Navy, Commander-in-Chief, Royal Indian Navy
- Major-General (Local Lieutenant-General) Treffry Owen Thompson, CB, CBE, KHP, Director of Medical Services, India
- Sir John Thorne Masey Bennett, CIE, CBE, MC, Indian Police, Inspector-General of Police, Punjab

== See also ==
- Order of the Star of India
