= List of knights companion of the Order of the Star of India =

This is a list of knights companion of the Order of the Star of India. The Letters Patent of 23 February 1861 founding the Order were gazetted on 25 June 1861, and established that the order would consist of the sovereign (the queen of the United Kingdom), the grand master (the viceroy of India, ex officio) and 25 knights, who bore the postnominal KSI.

Letters patent of 28 March 1866, gazetted on 25 May 1866, expanded the order to include the sovereign, the grand master, 25 knights grand commanders, 50 knights commanders, and 100 companions. There were later further extensions to the membership. At the time of the expansion of the order in 1866, the surviving knights companions became knights grand commanders (GCSI).

Date	Image	Name	Notes
25 June 1861		The Prince Consort	Died 14 December 1861
25 June 1861		The Prince of Wales	Became GCSI 24 May 1866
25 June 1861		The Nizam of Hyderabad	Became GCSI 24 May 1866
25 June 1861		The Viscount Gough	Became GCSI 24 May 1866
25 June 1861		The Maharajah of Gwalior	Became GCSI 24 May 1866
25 June 1861		The Lord Harris	Became GCSI 24 May 1866
25 June 1861		The Maharajah Duleep Singh	Became GCSI 24 May 1866
25 June 1861		The Lord Clyde	Died 24 August 1863
25 June 1861		The Maharajah of Jammu and Kashmir	Became GCSI 24 May 1866
25 June 1861		Sir George Russell Clerk	Became GCSI 24 May 1866
25 June 1861		The Maharajah Holkar of Indore	Became GCSI 24 May 1866
25 June 1861		The Maharajah Gaekwad of Baroda	Became GCSI 24 May 1866
25 June 1861		Sir John Lawrence, Bt	Became GCSI 24 May 1866
25 June 1861		The Maharajah of Patiala	Died 13 November 1862
25 June 1861		Sir James Outram, Bt	Died 11 March 1863
25 June 1861		The Begum of Bhopal	Became GCSI 24 May 1866
25 June 1861		Sir Hugh Henry Rose	Became GCSI 24 May 1866
25 June 1861		The Nawab of Rampur	Died 20 April 1865
19 August 1861		The Viscount Combermere	Died 21 February 1865
19 August 1861		Sir George Pollock	Became GCSI 24 May 1866
11 November 1863		The Rajah Bahadur of Jaipur	Became GCSI 24 May 1866
11 November 1863		The Rajah Bahadur of Jind	Died 26 January 1864
10 December 1864		The Rajah Bahadur of Kapurthala	Became GCSI 24 May 1866
10 December 1864		The Maharajah of Rewa	Became GCSI 24 May 1866
12 February 1866		Sir Henry Bartle Frere	Became GCSI 24 May 1866
12 February 1866		The Maharajah of Jodhpur	Became GCSI 24 May 1866
12 February 1866		Sir Robert Montgomery	Became GCSI 24 May 1866
12 February 1866		The Maharajah of Travancore	Became GCSI 24 May 1866
12 February 1866		Sir William Mansfield	Became GCSI 24 May 1866
12 February 1866		The Maharajah of Karauli	Became GCSI 24 May 1866

== See also ==
- List of knights commander of the Order of the Star of India
- List of knights grand commander of the Order of the Star of India

== Sources ==
- Haydn, Joseph; Horace Ockerby, eds. (1969). The Book of Dignities. Bath, UK: Firecrest. pp. 800–02.
