= Jwala Prasad Srivastava =

Sir Jwala Prasad Srivastava, KCSI, KBE (16 August 1889 – 15 December 1954) was an Indian industrialist, government minister and member of the Constituent Assembly of India.

Born in Basti in the North-Western Provinces (present Uttar Pradesh), he was the son of Janki Prasad Srivastava and Sohni Kaur. In 1907, he married Kailash Sinha, with whom he had two sons and five daughters. He was educated at Christ Church College in Kanpur, Muir Central College in Allahabad and at the Municipal College of Technology, Manchester. After taking a chemistry degree, he served as an industrial chemist in the government of the United Provinces from 1912 to 1919 before entering the private sector. He rose to become the managing director of several dyeing plants and textile mills in Kanpur and in the princely states of Rampur, Bhopal and Gwalior. He was elected to the Legislative Assembly of the United Provinces in 1926, 1930 and 1937. He served on the provincial Simon Committee in 1928-1929, and served as the UP Minister of Education and Industries from 1931-1937, also briefly serving as the temporary Finance Minister from April–July 1937.

During the Second World War, Srivastava served as a member of the National Defence Council, as the civil defence member of the Viceroy's Executive Councilfrom 1942-1943 and as the Member in Charge of Food from 1943-1946. He was appointed a member of the Constituent Assembly of India in 1947, serving through 1949, and transitioned to a Member of Parliament in 1950. He subsequently served as the chairman of the Sir J.P. Srivastava Group, controlling several industrial units. He died in Lucknow on 15 December 1954.

Srivastava was knighted in the 1934 King's Birthday Honours, appointed a Knight Commander of the Order of the British Empire (KBE) in the 1942 Birthday Honours and appointed a Knight Commander of the Order of the Star of India (KCSI) in the 1946 King's Birthday Honours List.
