= List of knights grand commander of the Order of the Star of India =

This is a list of knights grand commander (knights, 1861-1866) of the Most Exalted Order of the Star of India from 1861 until 1947, when the order ceased to be awarded. The viceroy of India served as ex-officio Grand Master of the Order, and was automatically appointed as a knight grand commander upon taking office.

== 1860s ==
- 1861-1866: See list of knights companion of the Order of the Star of India

=== 1867 ===
- His Highness Maharajadhiraja Shri Sir Jawansinhji Gambhirsinhji Sahib Bahadur, Maharaja of Idar

=== 1869 ===
- His Highness Bhagwant Singh, Maharaj Rana of Dholpur

== 1870s ==
=== 1870 ===
- His Highness Mahendra Singh, Maharaja of Patiala
- The Nawab Salar Jung Bahadoor, KCSI Minister of the Hyderabad State

=== 1871 ===
- His Highness Dheraj Sumbho Sing, Maharana of Oodeypore
- His Highness Pragmuljee, Rao of Cutch

=== 1872 ===
- Her Highness the Nawab Shah Jehan, Begum of Bhopal

=== 1873 ===
- His Excellency Maharajah Jung Bahadoor Kunwar Ranajee
- General Sir John Low
- Lieutenant-General Sir Neville Bowles Chamberlain

=== 1876 ===
- His Grace Richard Plantagenet Campbell, 3rd Duke of Buckingham and Chandos, Governor of the Presidency of Madras
- Sir Philip Edmond Wodehouse, KCB, Governor of the Presidency of Bombay

=== 1877 ===
- Field-Marshal His Royal Highness George William Frederick Charles, Duke of Cambridge

== 1880s ==
=== 1881 ===
- His Highness Sujjun Singh, Maharana of Udaipur

=== 1882 ===
- His Highness Visakham Thirunal, Maharajah of Travancore
- His Highness Nawab Ikbal-ud-dowlah of Oudh (Baghdad)

=== 1884 ===
- His Highness Chama Rajendra Wadeir, Maharajah of Mysore

=== 1888 ===
- His Highness Moolam Thirunal, Maharajah of Travancore.

== 1890s ==
=== 1892 ===
- Colonel His Highness Pratap Singh, Maharaja of Jammu and Kashmir.

=== 1893 ===
- General Frederick Sleigh, Baron Roberts of Kandahar

=== 1895 ===
- His Highness Madho Rao, Maharaja Scindia of Gwalior
- The Right Honourable George Robert Canning, Baron Harris
- His Highness Rajarshi Shahu, Maharaj of Kolhapur
- The Right Honourable Henry Hartley Fowler

=== 1896 ===
- (Extra) The Right Honourable Beilby Lawley, 3rd Baron Wenlock

=== 1897 ===
- His Highness Raja Sir Tassaduq Rasul Khan, of Jahangirabad Raj, United Provinces, Oudh
- His Highness Vyankatesh Raman Singh Bahadur, Maharaja of Rewa.
- Sir Joseph Dalton Hooker
- Maharaja Sir Bir Bhamsber Jang Rana Bahadur
- Sir Antony Patrick MacDonnell
- His Highness Lieutenant Colonel Sir Partab Singh Bahadur, Maharaja of Idar
- Lieutenant-General Richard Strachey

=== 1898 ===
- His Highness Rajinder Singh, Maharaja of Patiala.

== 1900s ==
=== 1900 ===
- His Highness Maharao Umed Singh Bahadur, of Kotah.

=== 1903 ===
- The Right Honourable Lord George Francis Hamilton
- His Highness Sir Shri Rama Varma, Rajarshi of Cochin
- Colonel His Highness Priyadarsi Devanampriya Maharaj-Adhiraj Maharaja Rudra Pratap Singh, Maharaja of Singrauli

=== 1905 ===
- His Excellency Maharaja Chandra Shamsher Jang, Rana Bahadur, Prime Minister of Nepal.

=== 1906 ===
- His Highness Pratap Singh Bahadur, Maharaja Ju Deo of Orchha

=== 1907 ===
- His Highness Sri Krishnaraja Wadiar Bahadur, Maharaja of Mysore.

=== 1909 ===
- His Highness Sir Rasul Khanji Mahabbat Khanji, Nawab of Junagarh.
- His Excellency General The Right Honourable Horatio Herbert, Viscount Kitchener of Khartoum

== 1910s ==
=== 1910 ===
- Her Highness Nawab Sultan Jahan Begam, Begum of Bhopal
- His Highness Sir Sardar Singh Bahadur, Maharaja of Jodhpur

=== 1911 ===
- Sir Steuart Colvin Bayley
- Sir Dennis Fitzpatrick
- Sir William Lee-Warner
- General Sir Dighton MacNaghten Probyn
- His Excellency Sir George Sydenham Clarke
- The Right Honourable Sir Arthur Lawley
- Sir John Prescott Hewett
- Colonel His Highness Sri Sir Gunga Singh Bahadur, Maharaja of Bikaner
- His Highness Major Sir Umed Singh Bahadur, Maharao of Kotah
- His Excellency General Sir Garrett O'Moore Creagh
- His Highness Farzand-i-Dilband Raish-ul-Itikad Daulat-i-Inglisbia Raja-i-Rajagan Raja Sir Jagatjit Singh, Bahadur Ahluwalia of Kapurthala.
- His Highness Asafjah Muzaffer-ul-Mulk-Maamalik Nizam-ul-Mulk Nizam-ud-Daula Nawab Mir Usman Ali Khan, Bahadur Fateh Jang, the 7th Nizam of Hyderabad.
- His Highness Sir Sultan Muhammad Shah Aga Khan

=== 1912 ===
- His Highness Amin-ud-Daula Wazir-ul-Mulk Nawab Sir Muhammad Ibrahim Ali Khan, Bahadur, Saulat Jang of Tonk

=== 1916 ===
- His Excellency General Sir Beauchamp Duff

=== 1917 ===
- His Highness Maharao Raja Sawai Sir Khengarji Bahadur Rao of Cutch.

=== 1918 ===
- His Excellency The Right Honourable Sir John Sinclair, Baron Pentland
- His Excellency Sir Freeman Freeman-Thomas, Baron Willingdon

=== 1919 ===
- His Excellency General Sir Sir Charles Monro, 1st Baronet
- His Highness Sir Raghubir Singh Bahadur, Maharao of Bundi
- George Carmichael
- Michael Ernest Sadler

== 1920s ==
=== 1921 ===
- Colonel His Highness Alhijah Farzand-i-Dilpazir-i-Daulat-i-Inglisihia, Mukhlis-ud-Daula Nasir-ul-Mulk Amir-ul-Umra Nawab Sir Hamid Ali Khan Bahadur, Nawab of Rampur
- Lieutenant-Colonel His Highness Sir Prabhu Narayan Singh Bahadur, Maharaja of Benares.
- Major-General His Highness Farzand-i-Khas-i-Daulet-i-Inglishia Mansur-i-Zaman Amar-ul-Umra Maharajadhiraja Rajeshwar Sri Maharaja-i-Rajagan Sir Bhupindar Singh Mahindar Bahadur, Maharaja of Patiala.

=== 1923 ===
- His Highness Lieutenant-Colonel Shri Sir Ranjitsinhji Vibhaji, Maharaja Jam Sahib

=== 1924 ===
- Colonel His Highness Sewai Maharaj Shri Jey Singh, Maharaja of Alwar
- James Lyle, Viscount Inchcape
- General Henry Seymour, Baron Rawlinson of Trent

=== 1925 ===
- The Right Honourable Victor Alexander George Robert, Earl of Lytton
- The Right Honourable Arthur Hamilton, Viscount Lee of Fareham

=== 1928 ===
- Sir Spencer Harcourt Butler

=== 1929 ===
- Lieutenant-Colonel and Honorary Colonel, George Joachim, Viscount Goschen of Hawkhurst
- Lieutenant-Colonel The Right Honourable Sir Leslie Orme Wilson

== 1930s ==
=== 1930 ===
- The Right Honourable Sir John Allsebrook Simon
- Field-Marshal Sir Claud William Jacob
- Field Marshal Sir William Riddell Birdwood

=== 1931 ===
- His Highness Sir Bhupal Singh Bahadur, Maharaja of Udaipur
- Lieutenant-Colonel His Highness Shri Sir Rajaram Chhatrapati, Maharaja of Kolhapur
- Major-General His Highness Projjwal-Nepal Tara-Dhish Sri Sri Sri Maharaja Sir Bhim Shumsher Jang Bahadur Rana.

=== 1932 ===
- Lieutenant-Colonel His Highness Iftikhar-ul-Mulk Sikandar Saulat Haji Sir Muhammad Hamidullah Khan Bahadur, Nawab of Bhopal.
- Sir William Malcolm Hailey
- The Right Honourable William Robert Wellesley, Earl Peel

=== 1933 ===
- Colonel His Highness Sir Hari Singh Indar Mahindar Bahadur, Maharaja of Jammu and Kashmir.

=== 1934 ===
- Lieutenant-Colonel the Right Honourable Sir George Frederick Stanley
- Field-Marshal Sir Philip Walhouse Chetwode
- Lieutenant-Colonel the Right Honourable Sir Samuel John Gurney Hoare

=== 1935 ===
- Lieutenant-General His Highness Ojaswi Rajanya Projjwala Nepala Tara Ati Pravala Gorkha Dakshina Bahu Prithuladheesha Sri Sri Sri Maharaja Sir Juddha Shumsher Jang Bahadur Rana

=== 1936 ===
- Lieutenant-Colonel Raj Rajeshwar Maharajadhiraja Sir Umaid Singh Bahadur, Maharaja of Jodhpur

=== 1937 ===
- His Highness Maharaja Shri Sir Bhagwatsinhji Sagramji, Maharaja of Gondal
- Ranbir Singh, the Maharaja of Jind

== 1940s ==
=== 1940 ===
- General Sir Robert Archibald Cassels

=== 1941 ===
- Major His Highness Rukn-ud-Daula Nusrat-i-Jang, Saif-ud-Daula Hafiz-ul-Mulk Mukhlis-ud-Daula wa Muin-ud-Daula Nawab al Haj Sir Sadiq Muhammad Khan, Nawab of Bahawalpur.

=== 1946 ===
- Lieutenant-Colonel His Highness Maharaja Mukhtar-ul-Mulk, Asim-ul-Iqtidar, Rafi-ush-Shan, Wala Shikoh Mohta-Sham-i-Dauran, Umdat-ul-Umra, Maharajadhi-Raja Alijah Hisam-us-Sultanat, Sir George Jivaji Rao, Maharaja Scindia of Gwalior.
- Lieutenant-Colonel His Highness Maharaja Sri Padmanabha Dasa Vanchi Pala Sir Bala Rama Varma, Maharaja of Travancore

=== 1947 ===
- Colonel His Highness Shri Sir Digvijaysinhji, Maharaja Jam Saheb of Nawanagar.

=== 1948 ===
- His Excellency Lieutenant-General Sir Archibald Edward Nye
- His Excellency Sir Frederick John Burrows
- Major His Highness Maharaja Sir Shahaji Chhatrapati, Maharaja of Kolhapur.
- Lieutenant-General His Highness Saramad-i-Rajaha-i-Hindustan Raj Rajindra Sri Maharajadhiraja Sawar Sir Man Singhji, Maharaja of Jaipur.
- Lieutenant-General His Highness Maharajadhiraja Raj Rajeshwar Shiromani Shri Sir Sadul Singhji Bahadur, Maharajah of Bikaner

== Honorary Knights Grand Commander ==
- 1868: Isma'il Pasha, Khedive of Egypt
- 1870: Ferdinand de Lesseps
- 1873: Mirza Hosein Khan Moshir od-Dowleh, Grand Vizier of Persia
- 1875: Tewfik Pasha of Egypt
- 1878: Muhammad Sharif Pasha, Minister of Foreign Affairs of Egypt, Saffet Pasha, Grand Vizier of the Ottoman Empire
- 1879: Khudadad Khan, Khan of Kalat
- 1885: Abdur Rahman Khan, Emir of Afghanistan
- 1887: Mass'oud Mirza Zell-e Soltan, Governor-General of Isfahan, Arabistan, Kurdistan, Yazd, etc.
- 1890: Ali bin Said of Zanzibar, Sultan of Zanzibar
- 1894: Hamad bin Thuwaini of Zanzibar, Sultan of Zanzibar
- 1896: Nubar Pasha
- 1909: Prince Auguste Louis Alberic d'Arenberg, President of the Suez Canal Company
- 1935: Maharaja Juddha Shamsher Jang Bahadur Rana, Prime Minister of Nepal
- 1945: Padma Shamsher Jang Bahadur Rana, Commander-in-Chief, Nepalese Army

== See also ==
Order of the Star of India
