= Order of the Star of India =

Dormant 1861 British order of chivalry

The Most Exalted Order of the Star of India
- Insignia of a Knight Grand Commander of the Order of the Star of India (GCSI)

Awarded by monarch of the United Kingdom
- Type: Order of chivalry
- Established: 1861
- Motto: Heaven's Light Our Guide
- Awarded for: At the monarch's pleasure
- Status: Last appointment in 1947; Dormant order since 2009
- Founder: Victoria
- Grades: Knight Grand Commander (GCSI); Knight Commander (KCSI); Companion (CSI)
- Former grades: Knight Companion

Precedence
- Next (higher): Order of the Bath
- Next (lower): Order of St Michael and St George
- Ribbon bar of the Star of India

The Most Exalted Order of the Star of India is an order of chivalry founded by Queen Victoria in 1861. The Order includes members of three classes:

1. Knight Grand Commander (GCSI)
2. Knight Commander (KCSI)
3. Companion (CSI)

No appointments have been made since the 1948 New Year Honours, shortly after the Partition of India in 1947. Following the death in 2009 of the last surviving knight, Sir Tej Singh Prabhakar, Maharaja of Alwar, the order became dormant.

The motto of the order was "Heaven's Light Our Guide." The Star of India emblem, the insignia of the order and the informal emblem of British India, was also used as the basis of a series of flags to represent the Indian Empire.

The order was the fifth most senior British order of chivalry, following the Order of the Garter, Order of the Thistle, Order of St Patrick and Order of the Bath. It is the senior order of chivalry associated with the British Raj; junior to it is the Order of the Indian Empire, and there is also, for women only, the Imperial Order of the Crown of India.

== History ==
Several years after the Indian Rebellion of 1857 and the consolidation of Great Britain's power as the governing authority in India, it was decided by the British Crown to create a new order of knighthood to honour Indian Princes and Chiefs, as well as British officers and administrators who served in India. On 25 June 1861, the following proclamation was issued by Queen Victoria:

The Queen, being desirous of affording to the Princes, Chiefs and People of the Indian Empire, a public and signal testimony of Her regard, by the Institution of an Order of knighthood, whereby Her resolution to take upon Herself the Government of the Territories in India may be commemorated, and by which Her Majesty may be enabled to reward conspicuous merit and loyalty, has been graciously pleased, by Letters Patent under the Great Seal of the United Kingdom of Great Britain and Ireland, to institute, erect, constitute, and create, an Order of Knighthood, to be known by, and have for ever hereafter, the name, style, and designation, of "The Most Exalted Order of the Star of India"

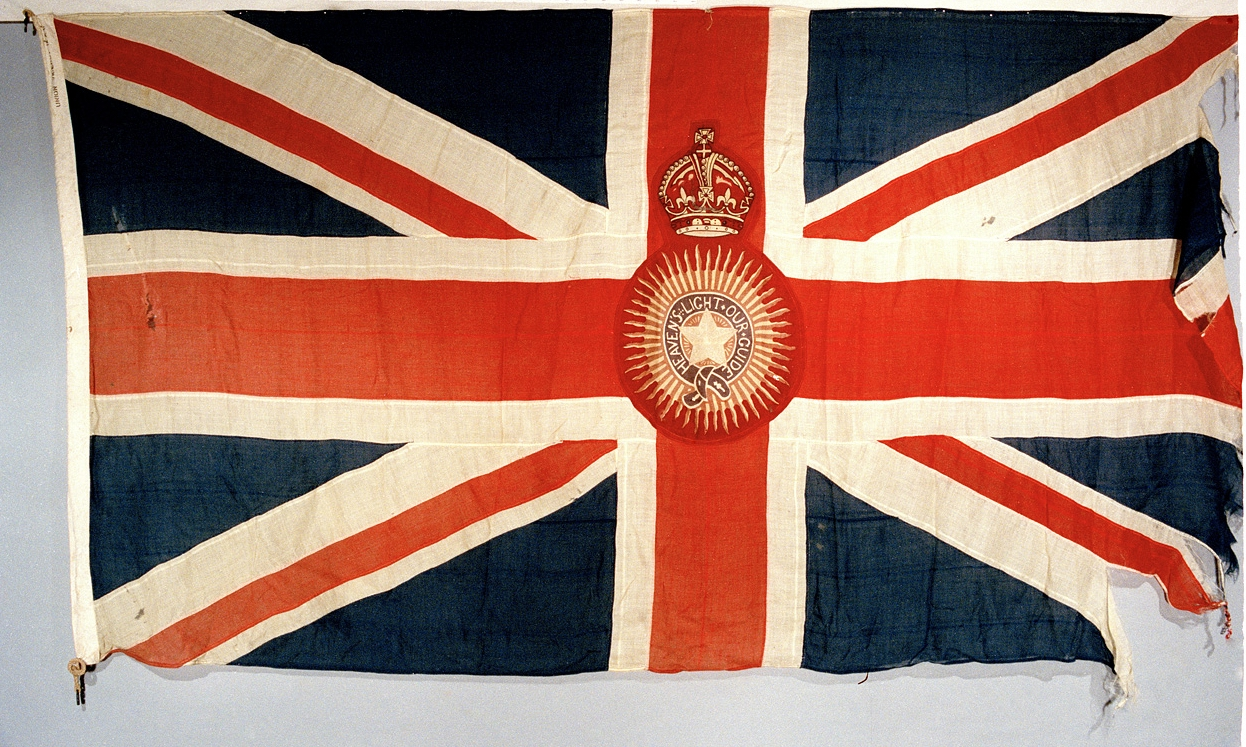
The Viceroy of India's flag featured the Star of the Order beneath the Tudor Crown.

== Recipients ==
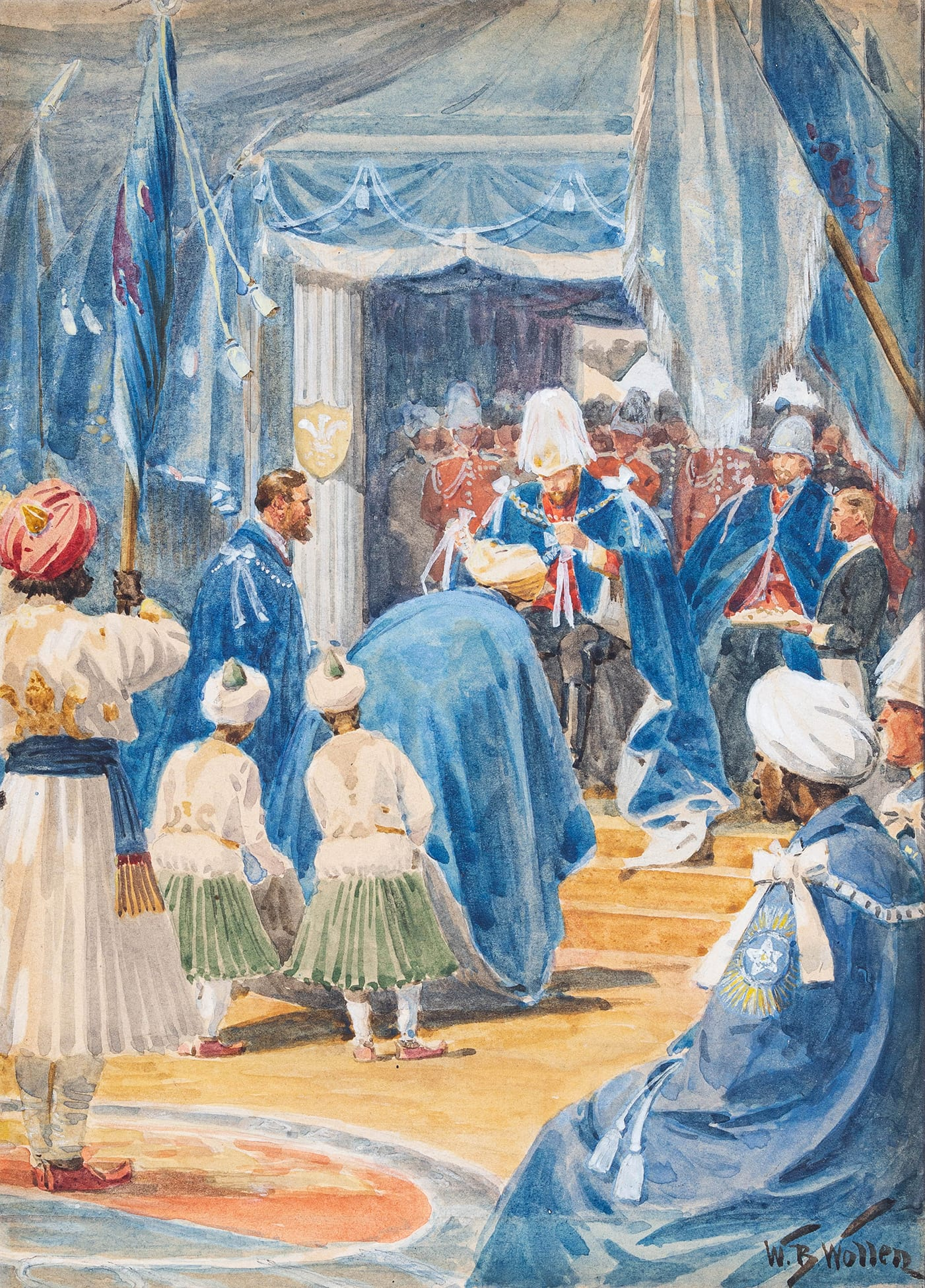
George V investing an Indian Prince with The Star of India, 14th December, 1911 by William Barnes Wollen

=== Knights Companion ===
19 persons were appointed Knights Companion at the creation of the Order:

- Albert, Prince Consort
- Albert Edward, Prince of Wales
- Charles Canning, 1st Earl Canning, GCB, Governor-General of India and Grand Master of the Order
- Sir James Outram, 1st Baronet, GCB, Member of the Viceroy's Executive Council
- George Harris, 3rd Baron Harris, Governor of Madras
- Sir George Russell Clerk, Governor of Bombay
- Sir John Laird Mair Lawrence, Bt, GCB, Lieutenant-Governor of Punjab
- Sir Hugh Henry Rose, GCB, Commander-in-Chief, India
- Hugh Gough, 1st Viscount Gough, former Commander-in-Chief, India
- Colin Campbell, 1st Baron Clyde, former Commander-in-Chief, India
- Tukojirao Holkar II, Maharaja of Indore
- Afzal-ud-Daulah, 5th Nizam of Hyderabad
- Jayajirao Scindia, Maharaja of Gwalior
- Duleep Singh, former Maharaja of the Sikh Empire
- Ranbir Singh Dogra, Maharaja of Jammu and Kashmir
- Yusef Ali Khan, Nawab of Rampur
- Nawab Sikander Begum, Nawab Begum of Bhopal
- Narinder Singh of Patiala, Maharaja of Patiala
- Khanderao II Gaekwad, Maharaja of Baroda
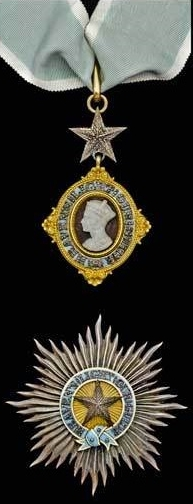
  Insignia of a Knight Commander of the Order.

12 additional Knights Companion were appointed over the next five years.

- 19 August 1861
  - Stapleton Cotton, 1st Viscount Combermere, former Commander-in-Chief, India
  - Sir George Pollock, 1st Baronet GCB, former commander of British forces in Afghanistan
- 11 November 1863
  - Ram Singh II, Maharaja of Jaipur
  - Swarup Singh, Rajah of Jind
- 10 December 1864
  - Randhir Singh, Raja of Kapurthala
  - Raghuraj Singh Ju Deo Bahadur, Maharaja of Rewa
- 12 February 1866
  - Sir Robert Montgomery, former Lieutenant-Governor of Punjab
  - Sir Henry Bartle Frere, Bt., GCB, Governor of Bombay
  - Takht Singh, Maharaja of Jodhpur
  - Ayilyam Thirunal, Maharaja of Travancore
  - General Sir William Mansfield, 1st Baron Sandhurst, KCB, Commander-in-Chief, India
  - Madan Pal, Maharaja of Karauli
  - Sir Joginder Sen Bahadur KCSI, Maharaja of Mandi

On 24 May 1866, the Order was expanded to additional ranks. All surviving Knights Companion were elevated to Grand Commander.

=== Later appointments ===
Additional appointments were made to the Order in the ranks of Grand Commander, Knight Commander, and Companion. These include

- Shahu of Kolhapur, Maharaja of Kolhapur
- Maharaja Bir Shumsher Jung Bahadur Rana of Nepal
- Maharaja Bahadur Sir JAIMANGAL Singh of Gidhaur Estate KCSI, 24 May 1866
- Maharaja Bahadur Sir Ravaneshwar Singh of Gidhaur Estate KCIE, 25 May 1895
- Nawab Sir Khwaja Salimullah Bahadur, Nawab of Dhaka
- Mir Osman Ali Khan Siddiqi Bayafandi – Asaf Jah VII – 7th Nizam of Hyderabad
- Maharaj Bhim Shumsher Jung Bahadur Rana
- Sadeq Mohammad Khan IV, Nawab of Bahawalpur
- Khan Bahadur Sir Mohammad Usman of Madras KCIE was appointed KCSI on 14 June 1945.

The last appointments to the Order were made in the 1948 New Year Honours, some months after the Partition of India in August 1947.

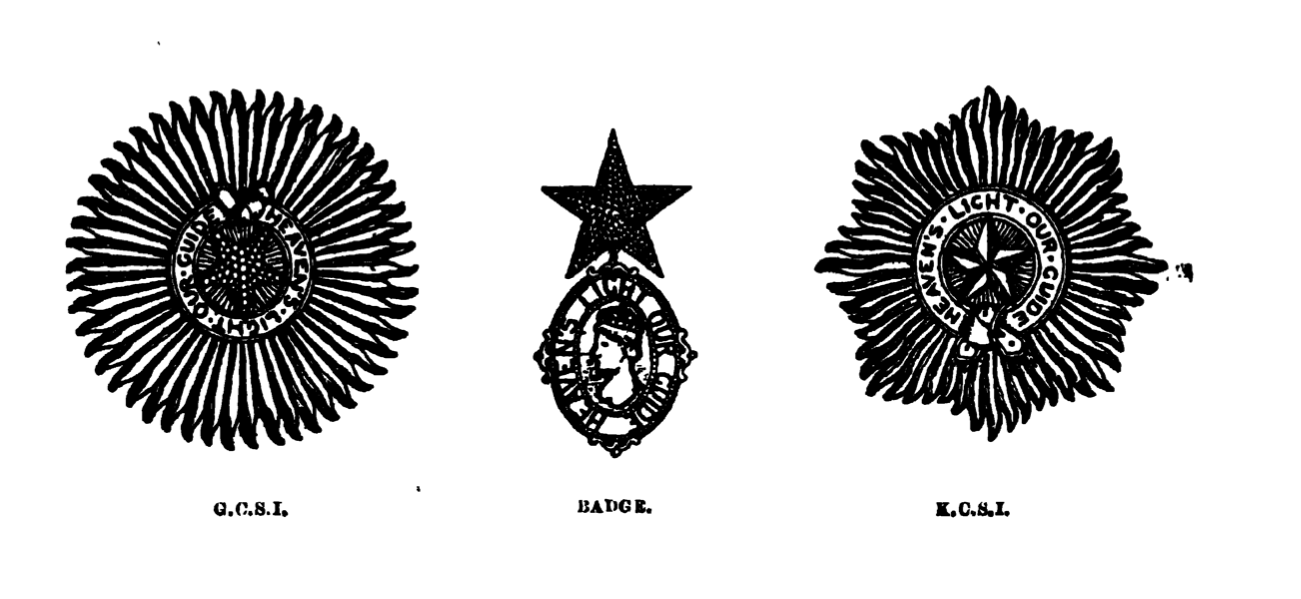
Insignia of the order

The Order of the Indian Empire, founded in 1877, was intended to be a less exclusive version of the Order of the Star of India; consequently, many more appointments were made to the former.

As the last Grand Master of the Orders, Lord Mountbatten was also the last known individual to wear publicly the stars of a Knight Grand Commander of both Orders, during the Silver Jubilee of Elizabeth II celebrations in 1977.

- There were only three female members of the Order: Nawab Sikander Begum of Bhopal; Nawab Sikander's daughter, Shah Jahan Begum of Bhopal; and Queen Mary, consort of George V.
- The last Grand Master of the Order, Admiral of the Fleet Lord Mountbatten of Burma (1900–1979), was assassinated by the Provisional IRA on 27 August 1979.
- The last surviving Knight Grand Commander, Maharaja Sree Padmanabhadasa Sir Chithira Thirunal Balarama Varma GCSI, GCIE, Maharajah of Travancore (1912–1991), died 19 July 1991 in Trivandrum.
- The last surviving Knight Commander, Maharaja Sir Tej Singh Prabhakar Bahadur KCSI (1911–2009), Maharaja of Alwar, died on 15 February 2009 in New Delhi.
- The last surviving Companion of the Order, Vice-Admiral Sir Ronald Brockman CSI (1909–1999), died on 3 September 1999 in London.

== Composition ==
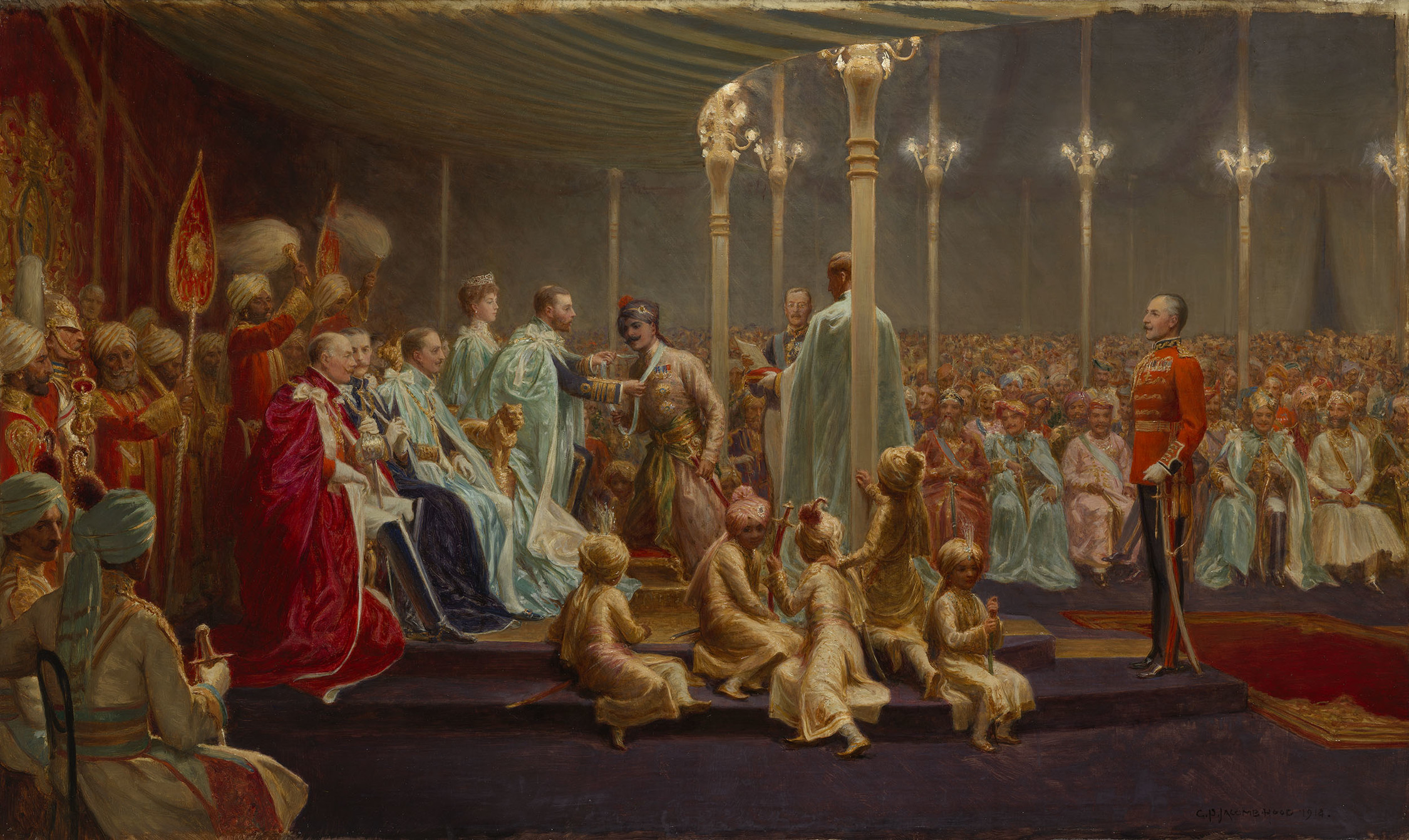
Investiture of the Star of India, Delhi (detail), by George Jacomb-Hood. King George V is depicted awarding the GCSI to Ganga Singh, Maharaja of Bikaner, at the 1911 Delhi Durbar

The British Sovereign was, and still is, Sovereign of the Order. The next most senior member was the Grand Master, a position held ex officio by the Viceroy of India. When the order was established in 1861, there was only one class of Knights Companion, who bore the postnominals KSI. In 1866, however, it was expanded to three classes. Members of the first class were known as "Knights Grand Commander" (rather than the usual "Knights Grand Cross") so as not to offend the non-Christian Indians appointed to the Order. All those surviving members who had already been made Knights Companion of the Order were retroactively known as Knights Grand Commander.

Former viceroys and other high officials, as well as those who served in the Department of the Secretary of State for India for at least thirty years were eligible for appointment. Rulers of Indian Princely States were also eligible for appointment. Some states were of such importance that their rulers were almost always appointed Knights Grand Commander; such rulers included the Nizam of Hyderabad, the Maharaja of Mysore, the Maharaja of Jammu and Kashmir, the Maharaja of Baroda, the Maharajas of Gwalior, the Nawab of Bhopal, the Maharaja of Indore, the Maharajas of Singrauli, the Maharana of Udaipur, the Maharaja of Travancore, the Maharaja of Jodhpur and the Maharao of Cutch.

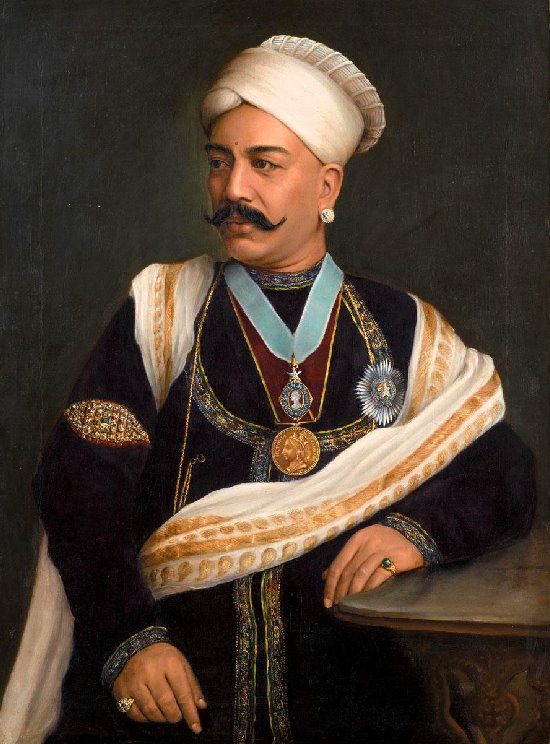
Tanjore Madhava Rao, the Diwan of Travancore, wearing the Order. Portrait circa 1880.

Kashi Naresh Prabhu Narayan Singh of Benares and Sir Azizul Haque were appointed Knight Commander of the Order of the Indian Empire (KCIE) in 1892 and 1941 respectively, Knight Grand Commander of the Order of the Indian Empire (GCIE) in 1898, and Knight Grand Commander of the Order of the Star of India (GCSI) for his services in the First World War in the 1921 New Year Honours.

Rulers of other nations in Asia and the Middle East, including the Emir of Kuwait, the Maharajas of the Rana dynasty, the Khedive of Egypt, the King of Bhutan and the rulers of Zanzibar, Bahrain and Oman were also appointed to the Order. Like some rulers of princely states, some rulers of particular prestige, for example the Maharajas of the Rana dynasty or the Sultans of Oman, were usually appointed Knights Grand Commander.

Women, save the princely rulers, were ineligible for appointment to the order. They were, unlike the habit of many other orders, admitted as "Knights", rather than as "Dames" or "Ladies". The first woman to be admitted to the order was Nawab Sikandar Begum Sahiba, Nawab Begum of Bhopal; she was created a Knight Companion at the Order's foundation in 1861. The order's statutes were specially amended to permit the admission of Queen Mary as a Knight Grand Commander in 1911.

== Vestments and accoutrements ==
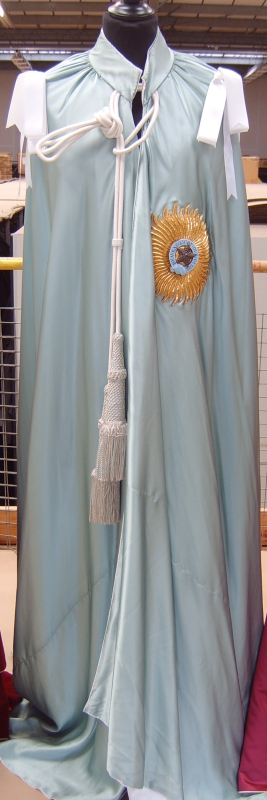
Mantle of the Order

Members of the Order wore elaborate costumes on important ceremonial occasions:

- The mantle, worn only by Knights Grand Commander, was made of light blue satin lined with white silk. On the left side was a representation of the star (see below).
- The collar, also worn only by Knights Grand Commander, was made of gold. It was composed of alternating figures of lotuses, red and white roses and palm branches, with an imperial crown in the centre.

On certain "collar days" designated by the Sovereign, members attending formal events wore the order's collar over their military uniform, formal day dress, or evening wear. When collars were worn (either on collar days or on formal occasions such as coronations), the badge was suspended from the collar.

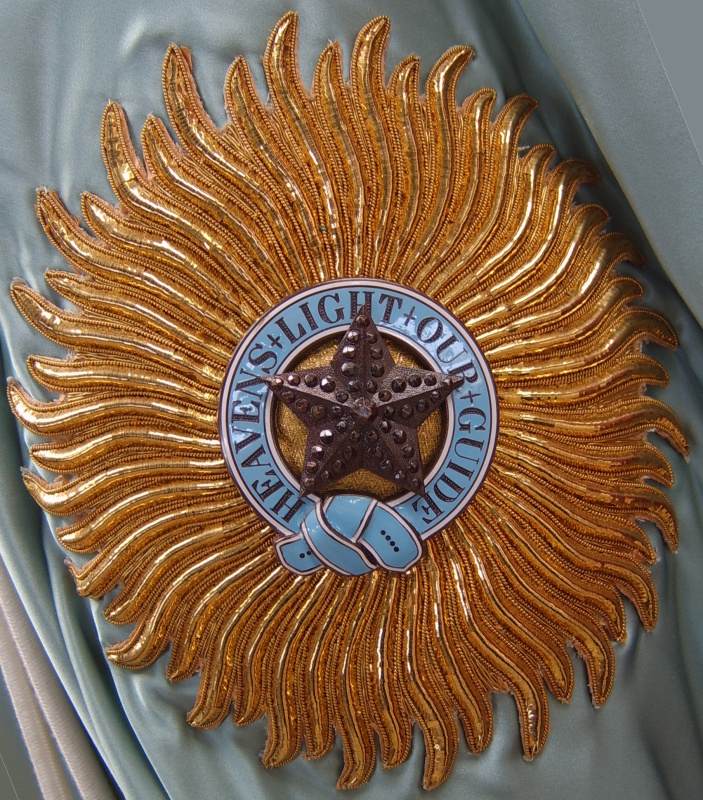
Representation of the star of the order on the mantle

At less important occasions, simpler insignia were used:

- The star, worn only by Knights Grand Commander and Knights Commander, included a sunburst, with twenty-six large rays alternating with twenty-six small rays; it was in gold and circular for Knights Grand Commander, and in silver and eight-pointed for Knights Commander. In the centre of the sunburst was a light blue ring bearing the motto of the Order. Within the ribbon was a five-pointed star, decorated with diamonds for Knights Grand Commander.
- The badge was worn by Knights Grand Commander on a white-edged light blue riband, or sash, passing from the right shoulder to the left hip, and by Knights Commander and Companions from a white-edged light blue ribbon around the neck. It included an oval, containing the effigy of the Sovereign, surrounded by a light blue ring bearing the motto of the Order; the oval was suspended from a five-pointed star, which may be decorated with diamonds depending on class.

Unlike the insignia of most other British chivalric orders, the insignia of the Order of the Star of India did not incorporate crosses, as they were deemed unacceptable to the Indian princes appointed to the Order.

== Precedence and privileges ==
Members of all classes of the Order were assigned positions in the order of precedence. Wives of members of all classes also featured on the order of precedence, as did sons, daughters and daughters-in-law of Knights Grand Commander and Knights Commander. (See order of precedence in England and Wales for the exact positions.)

Star and Collar of a Knight Grand Commander of the Order

Knights Grand Commander used the post-nominal initials "GCSI", Knights Commander "KCSI" and Companions "CSI". Knights Grand Commander and Knights Commander prefixed "Sir" to their forenames. Wives of Knights Grand Commander and Knights Commander could prefix "Lady" to their surnames. Such forms were not used by peers and Indian princes, except when the names of the former were written out in their fullest forms.

Knights Grand Commander were also entitled to receive heraldic supporters. They could, furthermore, encircle their arms with a depiction of the circlet (a circle bearing the motto) and the collar; the former is shown either outside or on top of the latter. Knights Commander and Companions were permitted to display the circlet, but not the collar, surrounding their arms. The badge is depicted suspended from the collar or circlet.

== Gallery ==
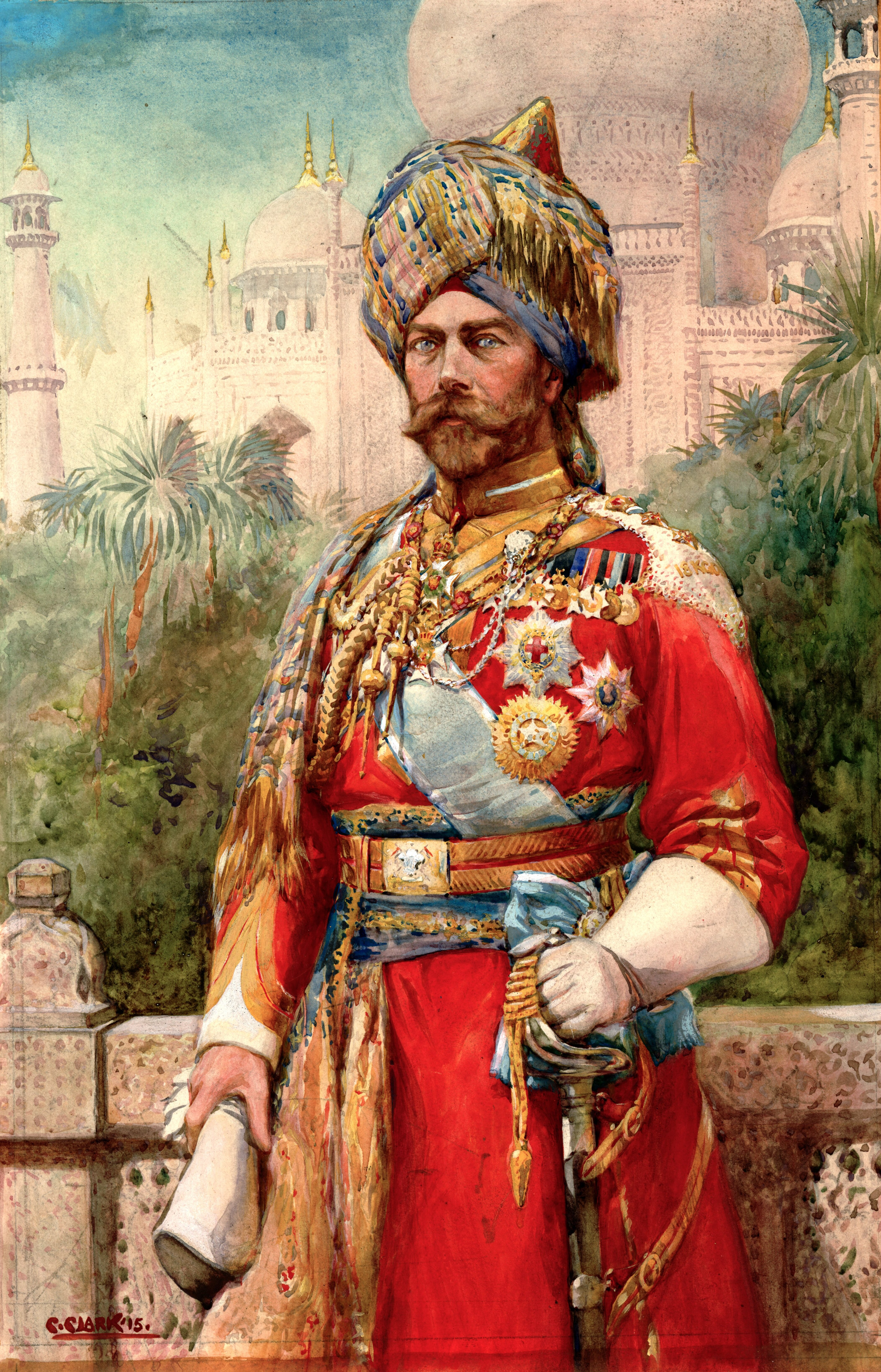
Portrait of King George V at Delhi by Christopher Clark, 1915. He wears the Order with the uniform of the 18th King George's Own Lancers.

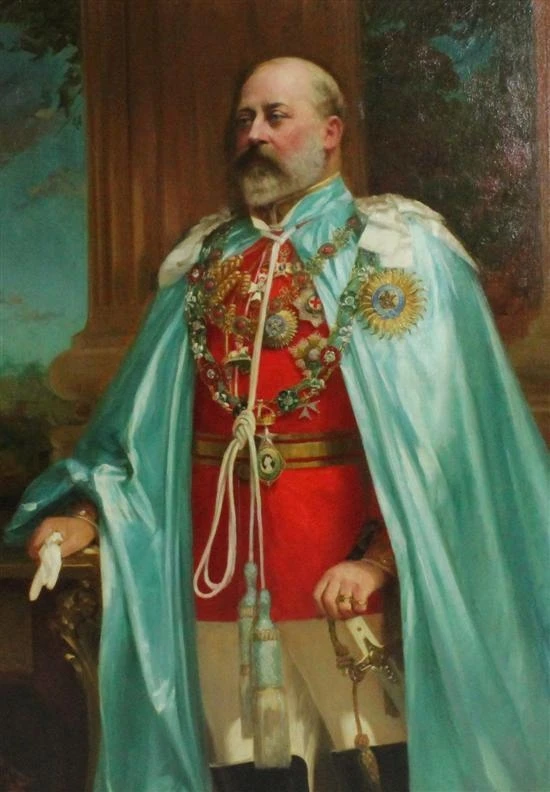
Portrait of King Edward VII wearing the Robes of the Order, by Alfred James Downey.

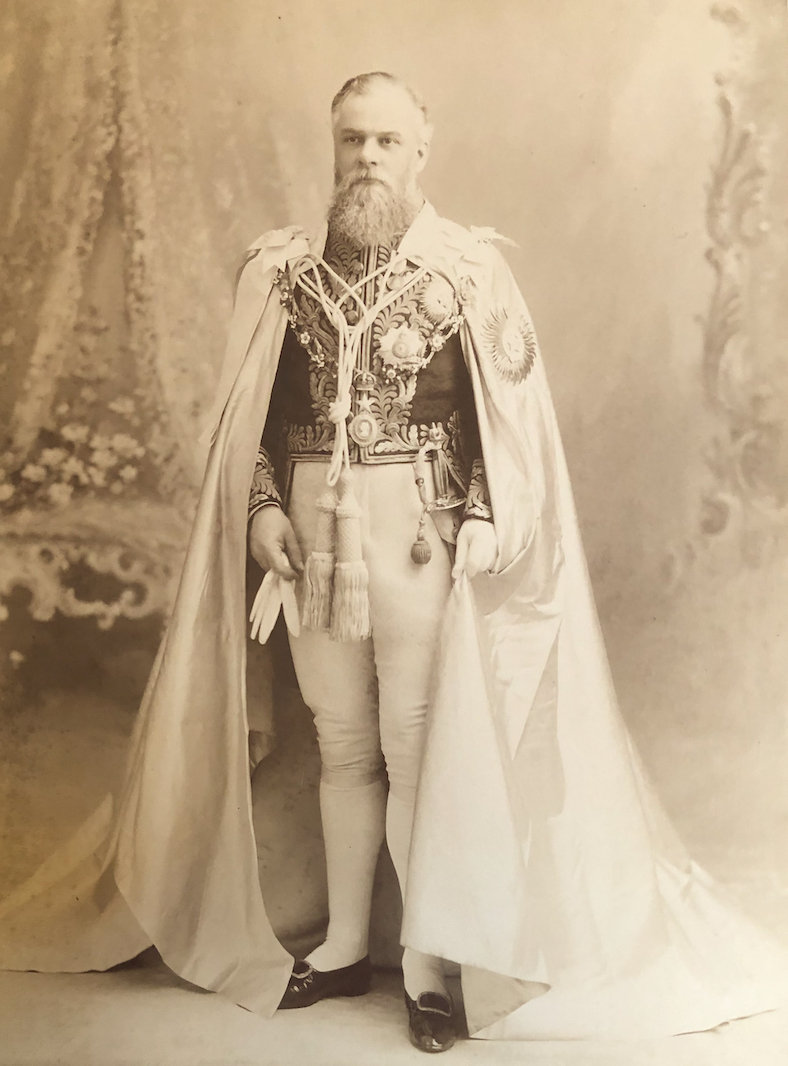
Victor Bruce, 9th Earl of Elgin, Viceroy of India, in the robes of the Order of the Star of India (as Grand Master of the Order)

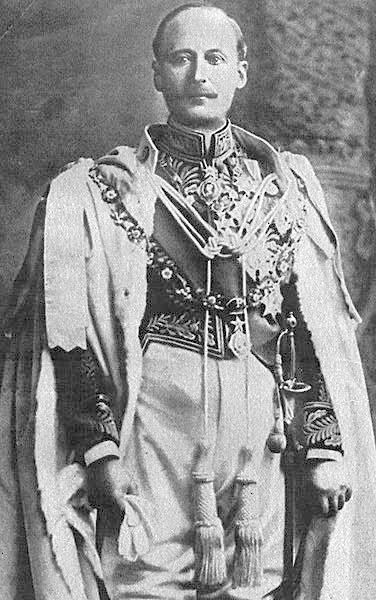
Charles Hardinge, 1st Baron Hardinge of Penshurst, Viceroy of India, in the robes of the Order (as Grand Master of the Order)

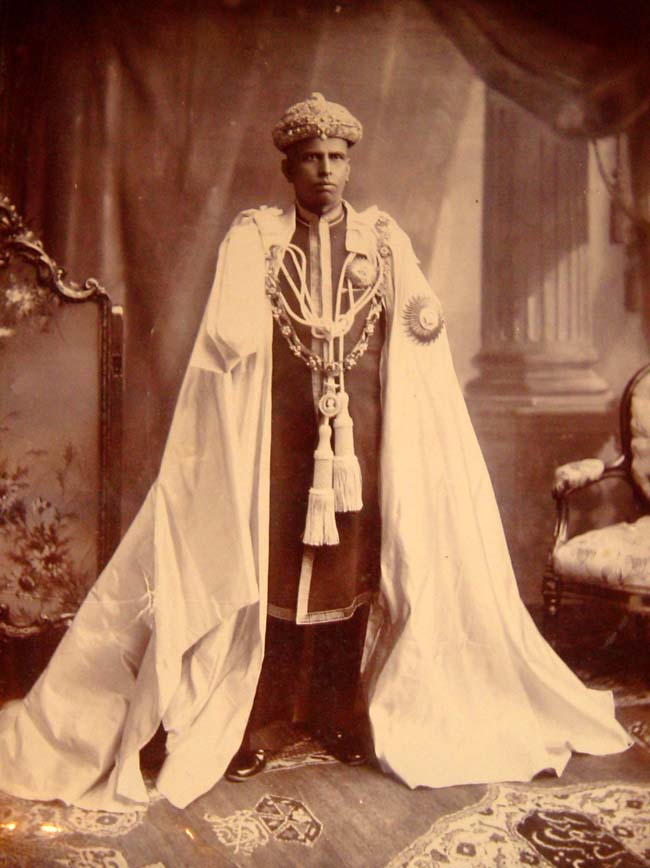
Rama Varma XV, Maharaja of Cochin wearing the mantle of the Order for the occasion of King Edward VII's Delhi Durbar of 1903

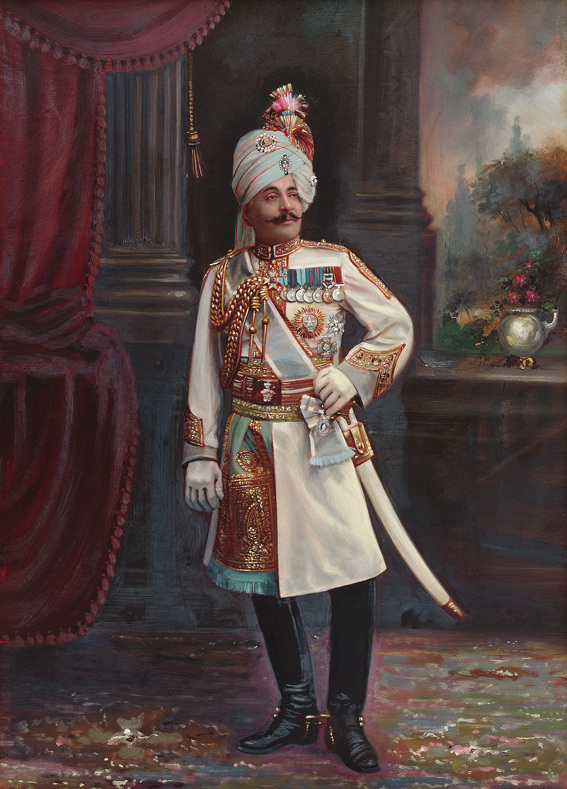
Pratap Singh, Maharaja of Idar, wearing the Order. Paint on photograph, 1900-20.

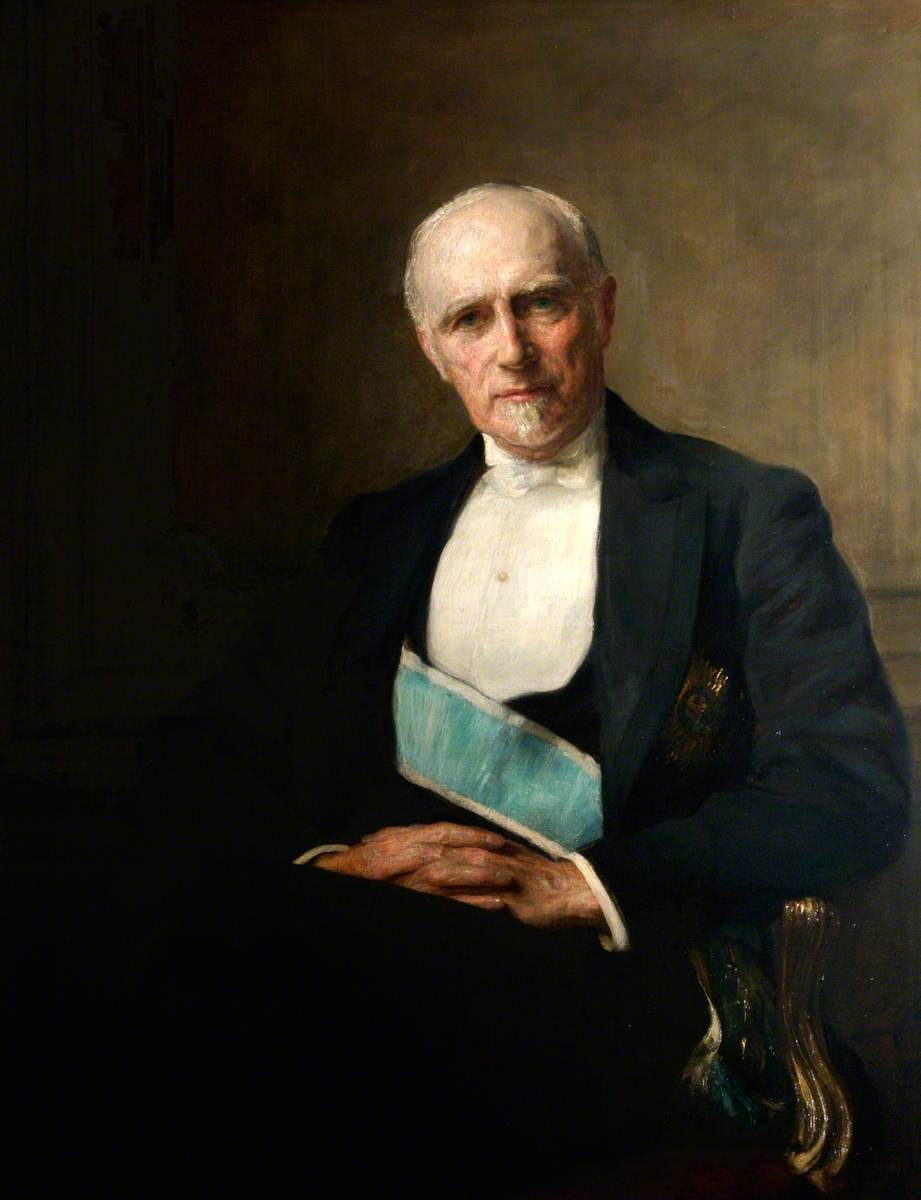
Thomas Baring, 1st Earl of Northbrook wearing the GSCI sash

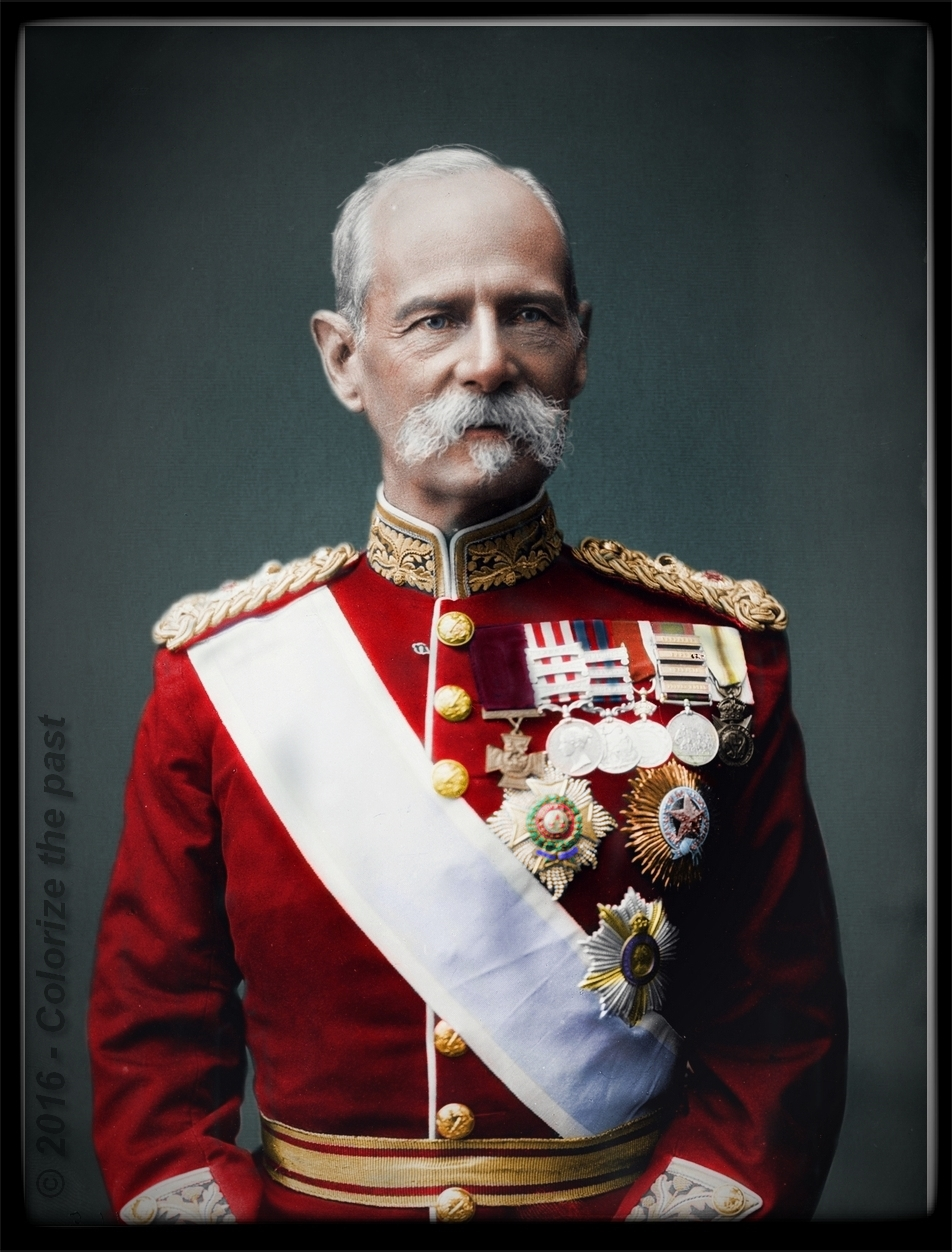
Frederick Roberts, 1st Earl Roberts with GCSI star and sash

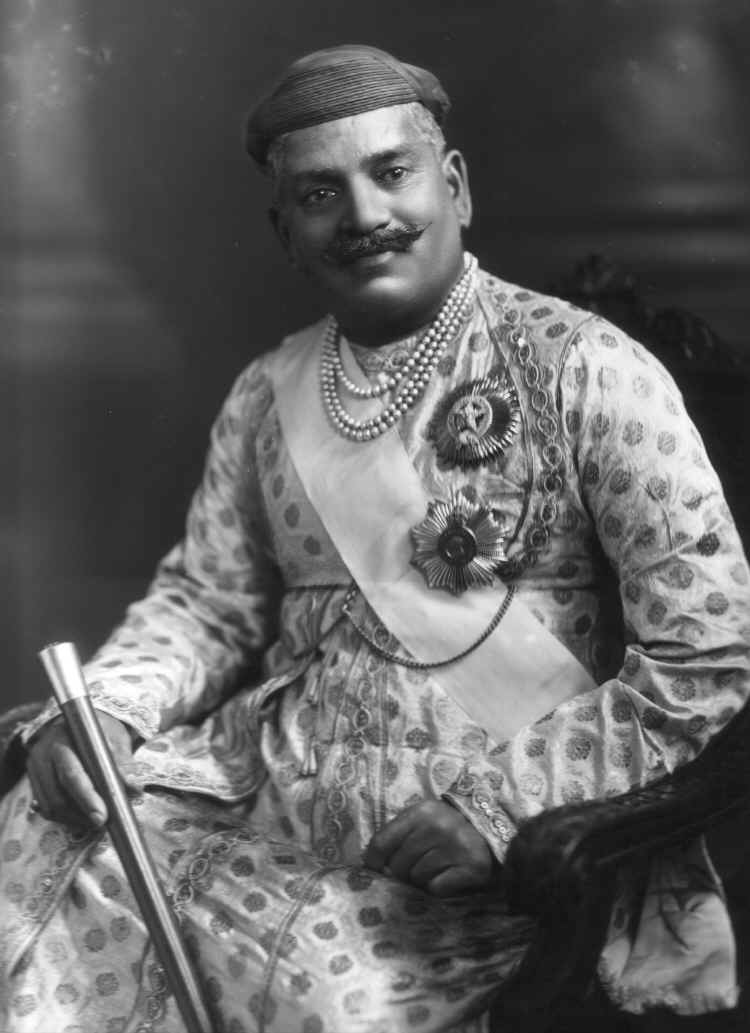
Sayajirao Gaekwad III, Maharaja of Baroda, wearing the sash and star of a Knight Grand Commander (GCSI), along with the star of a Knight Grand Commander of the Order of the Indian Empire (GCIE)

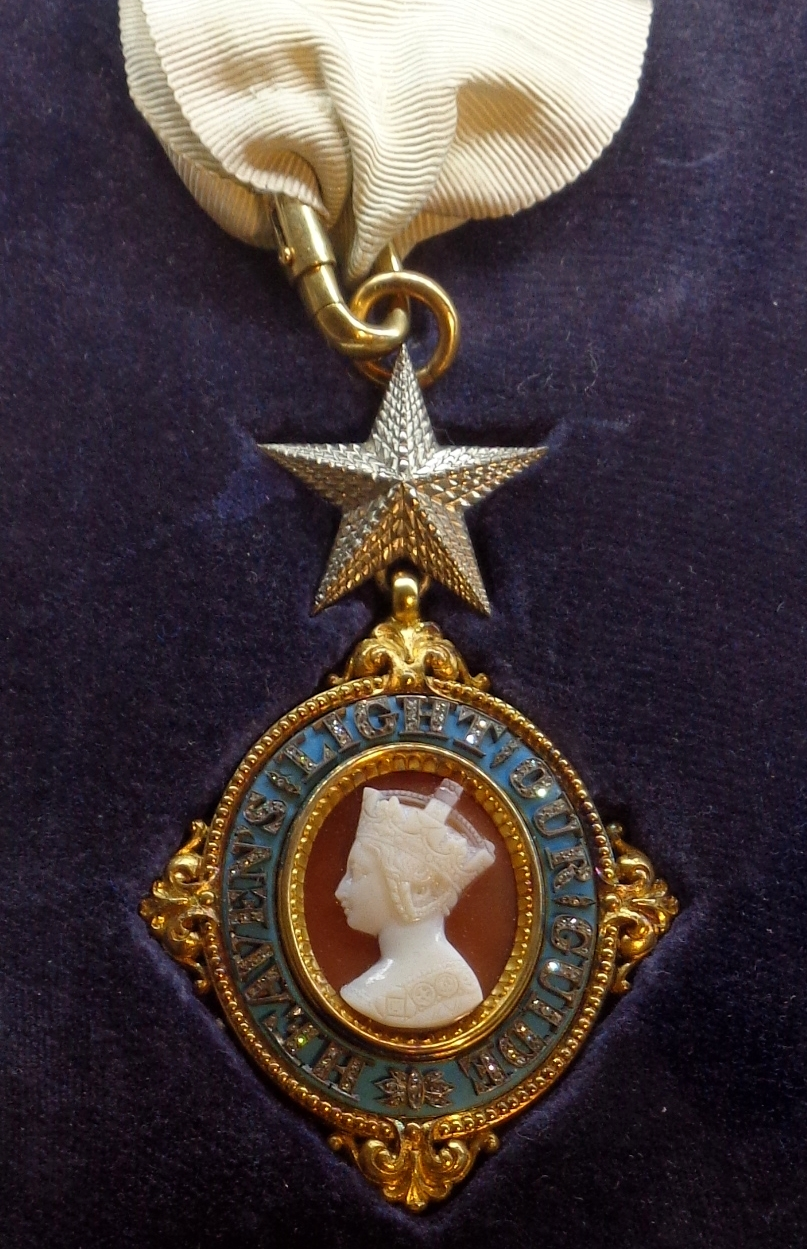
Badge of a Knight Commander, circa 1900.

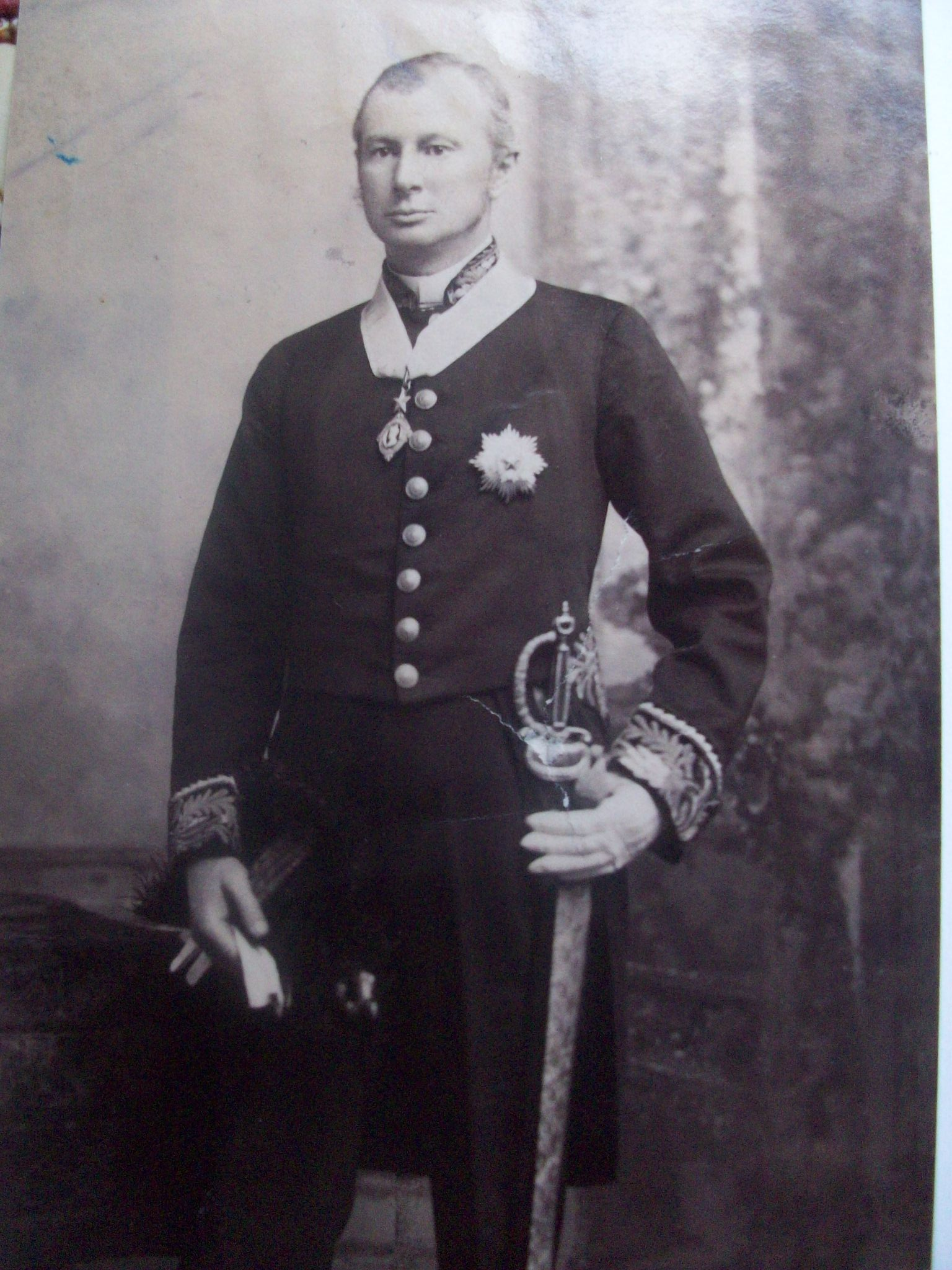
Indian Civil Service officer Henry Stokes, wearing the insignia of a Knight Commander (KCSI) of the Order.

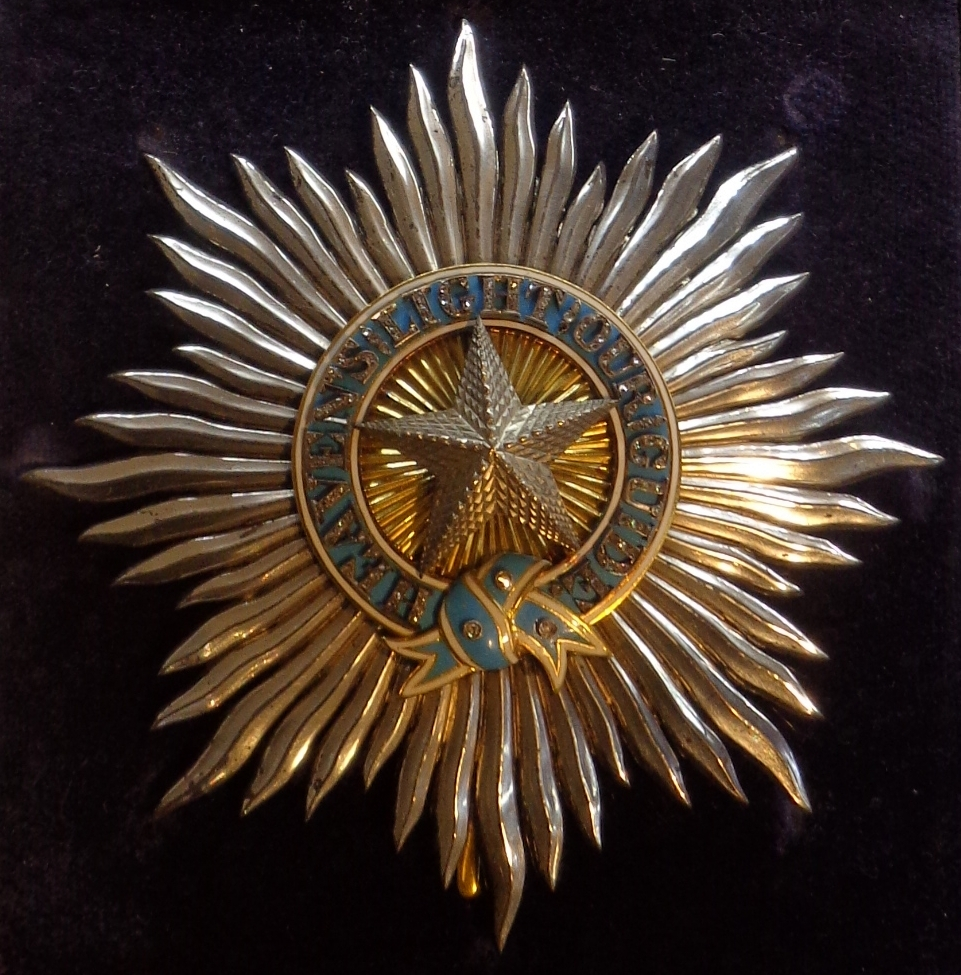
Star of a Knight Commander, circa 1900.

== See also ==
- List of knights grand commander of the Order of the Star of India
