= Viceroy's Executive Council =

Advisory body to the Viceroy of British India

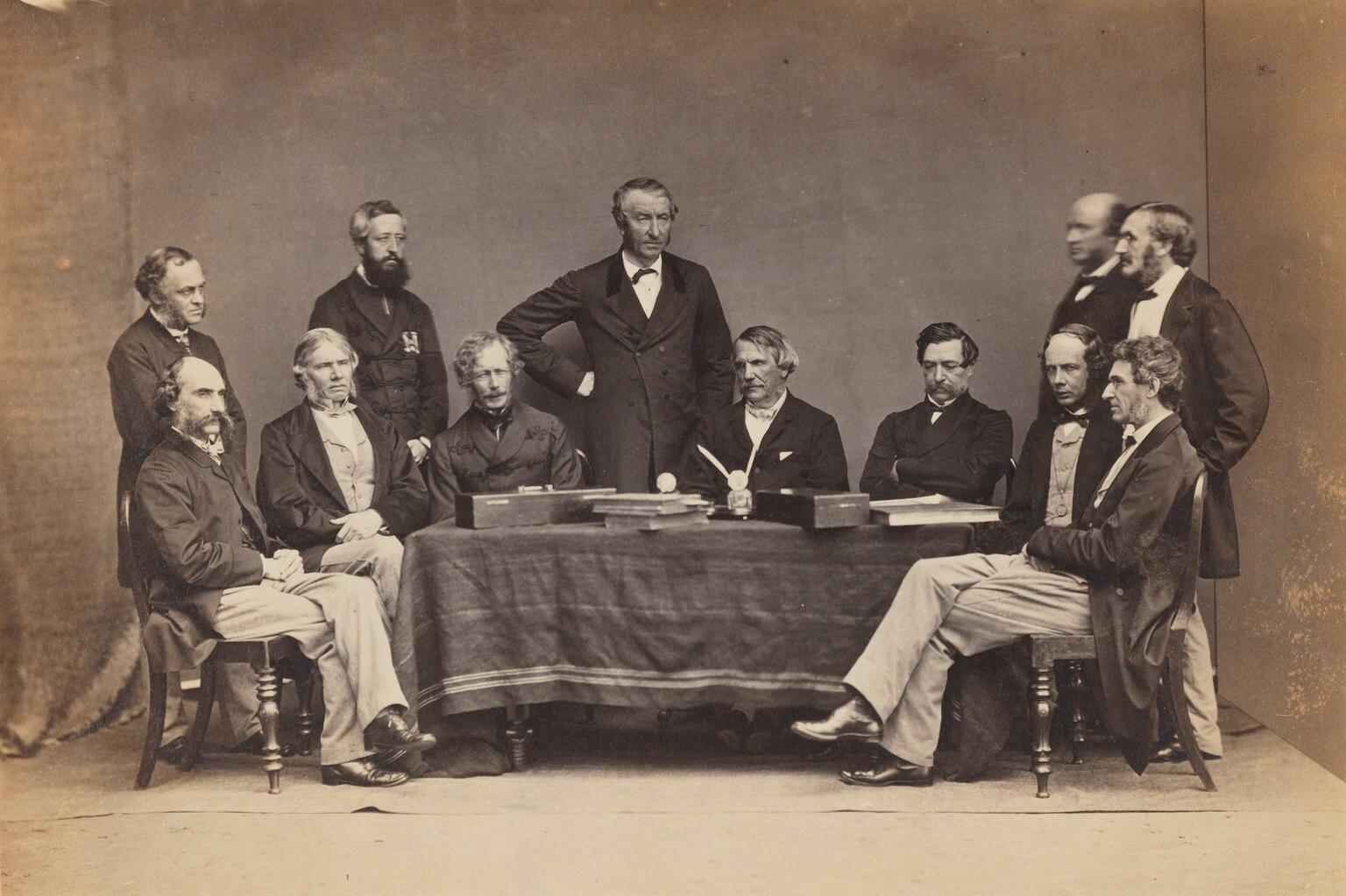
Viceroy John Lawrence's executive council in Shimla, 1864

The Viceroy's Executive Council, formerly known as the Council of Four and officially known as the Council of the Governor-General of India (since 1858), was an advisory body and cabinet of the Governor-General of India, also known as Viceroy. It existed from 1773 to 1947 in some form or the other.

It was established by the Regulating Act 1773 (13 Geo. 3. c. 63), with four members and was then known as the Council of Four. The Indian Councils Act 1861 (24 & 25 Vict. c. 67) transformed it from an advisory council into a cabinet with a portfolio system. Each member was assigned specific portfolios such as revenue, military, law, finance, and home. In 1874, a sixth member was added to be in charge of public works.

== History ==
=== Company rule ===
The Regulating Act 1773 (13 Geo. 3. c. 63) provided for the appointment of a governor-general of Fort William in Bengal (or Governor-General of Bengal) with supervisory powers over the presidencies of Madras and Bombay and the formation of a council of four members. The governor-general was given a casting vote in the council but no authority to veto any decision of the council. The council was then known as the Council of Four.

In 1784, the council was reduced to three members; the Governor-General continued to have both an ordinary vote and a casting vote. In 1786, the power of the Governor-General was increased even further, as Council decisions ceased to be binding. The Charter Act 1833 (3 & 4 Will. 4. c. 85) made further changes to the structure of the council. The act was the first law to distinguish between the executive and legislative responsibilities of the Governor-General. As provided under the act, there were to be four members of the Council elected by the Court of Directors. The first three members were permitted to participate on all occasions, but the fourth member was only allowed to sit and vote when legislation was being debated.

=== Crown rule ===
The Government of India Act 1858 (21 & 22 Vict. c. 106) transferred the power of the East India Company to the British Crown which was empowered to appoint a Viceroy and Governor-General of India to head the government in India. The advisory council of the Governor-General was based in the capital Calcutta and consisted of four members, three of which were appointed by the Secretary of State for India and one by the Sovereign.

The Indian Councils Act 1861 9(24 & 25 Vict. c. 67) transformed the Viceroy of India's advisory council into a cabinet run on the portfolio system and increased the number of members by one. Three members were to be appointed by the Secretary of State for India, and two by the Sovereign. The five ordinary members each took charge of a separate department: home, revenue, military, law and finance. The military Commander-in-Chief sat in with the council as an extraordinary member. The Viceroy was allowed, under the provisions of the act, to overrule the council on affairs if he deemed it necessary. In 1869, the power to appoint all five members was passed to the Crown and in 1874, a new member was added to be in charge of public works.

The Indian Councils Act 1909 (9 Edw. 7. c. 4) empowered the Governor General to nominate one Indian member to the Executive Council leading to the appointment of Satyendra Prasanna Sinha as the first Indian member. The Government of India Act 1919 (9 & 10 Geo. 5. c. 101) increased the number of Indians in the council to three.

== Indians in the Council (1909–1940) ==
- Law Members: Satyendra Prasad Sinha (1909–1914), P. S. Sivaswami Iyer (1912–1917), Syed Ali Imam, Muhammad Shafi (1924–1928), Tej Bahadur Sapru (1920–1923), Satish Ranjan Das, Brojendra Mitter (1931–1934), Nripendra Nath Sircar (1934–1939), Bepin Behari Ghose (1933), Nalini Ranjan Chatterjee
- C. Sankaran Nair (1915–1919): Education
- Muhammad Shafi: Education (1919–1924)
- B. N. Sarma (1920–1925): Revenue and Agriculture
- Bhupendra Nath Mitra: Industries and Labour
- Muhammad Habibullah (1925–1930): Education, Health and Lands
- Fazl-i-Hussain (1930–1935)
- C. P. Ramaswami Iyer: Law (1931–1932), Commerce (1932), Information (1942)
- Kurma Venkata Reddy Naidu (1934–1937)
- Muhammad Zafarullah Khan (1935–1941): Commerce (–1939), Law (1939–), Railway, Industries and Labour, and War Supply
- Arcot Ramasamy Mudaliar: Commerce and Labour (1939–1941), Supply (1943)
- Kunwar Sir Jagdish Prasad: Health, Education and Lands
- Girija Shankar Bajpai (1940): Health, Education
- Attaullah Tarar (1931–1941 ?)

== Expansion in 1941 and 1942 ==
On 8 August 1940, the Viceroy Lord Linlithgow made a proposal called the August Offer which expanded the Executive Council to include more Indians. These proposals were rejected by the Indian National Congress, All-India Muslim League and Hindu Mahasabha.

However they were revived the next year by Sir Tej Bahadur Sapru of the Liberal Party, and accepted by Viceroy who on the 22nd of July 1941 announced a reconstituted Executive Council where for the first time Indians outnumbered Britons.

In addition he announced a 30-member National Defence Council intended to coordinate the war effort between the central government, provincial governments (four of which had elected governments) and the princely states.

An attempt was made to maintain communal balance, but Jinnah as part of his effort to establish his position as the sole spokesman of the Indian Muslim community ordered all AIML members to resign from the Viceroy's Executive and National Defence councils as the Viceroy had not accepted his demand for 50% Muslim representation, nor consulted Jinnah on the selection of Muslim members.

On 2 July 1942 the Viceroy’s Council was again enlarged from 12 to 15. Sir Malik Feroz Khan Noon (ICS officer and High Commissioner in London) appointed Defence member, the first Indian to hold the post (key Congress demand). Sir Ramaswamy Mudaliar, a Tamil politician and Maharaja Jam Saheb Sri Digvijaysinhji Ranjitsinhji of Jamnagar were appointed to newly elevated positions as representatives of the Government of India to the Imperial War Cabinet in London and to Pacific War Council in Washington DC.

The council now consisted of:

Portfolio	Name	Tenure
Viceroy and Governor-General of India	The Marquess of Linlithgow	18 April 1936 – 1 October 1943
Viceroy and Governor-General of India	The Viscount Wavell	1 October 1943 – 21 February 1947
Commander-in-Chief, India	General Sir Archibald Wavell	5 July 1941 – 5 January 1942
Commander-in-Chief, India	General Sir Alan Hartley	5 January 1942 – 7 March 1942
Commander-in-Chief, India	Field Marshal Sir Archibald Wavell	7 March 1942 – 20 June 1943
Commander-in-Chief, India	General Sir Claude Auchinleck	20 June 1943 – 21 February 1947
Home	Sir Reginald Maxwell	1941–1944
Home	Sir Robert Francis Mudie	1944–1946
Finance	Sir Jeremy Raisman	1941–1946
Defence	Sir Malik Feroz Khan Noon	1942–1944
Civil Defence	Dr. Edpuganti Raghavendra Rao	1941–1942
Civil Defence	Sir Jwala Prasad Srivastava	1942–1943
Law	Sir Syed Sultan Ahmed	1941–1943
Law	Asok Kumar Roy	1943–1946
Information	Sir Akbar Hydari	1941–1942
Information	Sir Syed Sultan Ahmed	1943–
Communications	Sir Andrew Clow	1941
Supply	Sir Homi Mody	1941–1942
Supply	Sir Arcot Ramasamy Mudaliar	1943
Commerce	Sir Arcot Ramasamy Mudaliar	1941
Commerce	Nalini Ranjan Sarkar	1942
Health, Education and Lands	Nalini Ranjan Sarkar	1941
Health, Education and Lands	Jogendra Singh	1942–1946
Labour	Feroz Khan Noon	1941
Labour	B. R. Ambedkar	1942–1946
Indians Overseas and Commonwealth Relations	Madhav Shrihari Aney	1941–1943
Indians Overseas and Commonwealth Relations	Narayan Bhaskar Khare	1943–1946
India's Representative at the British War Cabinet and on the Pacific War Council	Arcot Ramasamy Mudaliar	1942–1944
India's Representative at the British War Cabinet and on the Pacific War Council	Feroz Khan Noon	1944–1945
War Transport	Sir E. C. Benthall	1942–1946
Posts and Air	Mohammad Usman	1942–1946
Posts and Air	Gurunath Venkatesh Bewoor	1946
Food	Sir Jwala Prasad Srivastava	1943–1946
Commerce, industries, civil supplies	Mohammad Azizul Huque	1943–1945
Post-war Reconstruction	Ardeshir Dalal	1944–1945

== Interim Government ==
As per the mid-June 1946 Cabinet Mission Plan, the Executive Council was expanded to consist of only Indian members except the Viceroy and the Commander-in-Chief intended to form the Interim Government of India until the transfer of power. The Viceroy, Viscount Wavell extended invitations for 14 members.

The Interim Government began to function from 2 September 1946 once the Indian National Congress members took their seats. However, the All-India Muslim League refused to participate until 26 October 1946. The Interim Government served until transfer of power to the Dominion of India and the Dominion of Pakistan on 15 August 1947.

=== Members of Interim Government ===
Portfolio	Name	Party
Viceroy and Governor-General of India	The Viscount Wavell Lord Louis Mountbatten	None
Commander-in-Chief, India	General Sir Claude Auchinleck	None
Vice-President of the Executive Council External Affairs & Commonwealth Relations	Jawaharlal Nehru	Indian National Congress
Home Affairs Information & Broadcasting	Vallabhbhai Patel	Indian National Congress
Defence	Baldev Singh	Indian National Congress
Industries and Supplies	John Matthai	Indian National Congress
Education	C. Rajagopalachari	Indian National Congress
Works, Mines and Power	Sarat Chandra Bose	Indian National Congress
Works, Mines and Power	C. H. Bhabha	Indian National Congress
Food and Agriculture	Rajendra Prasad	Indian National Congress
Railways and Transport	Asaf Ali	Indian National Congress
Labour	Jagjivan Ram	Indian National Congress
Finance	Liaquat Ali Khan	All-India Muslim League
Commerce	Ibrahim Ismail Chundrigar	All-India Muslim League
Health	Ghazanfar Ali Khan	All-India Muslim League
Posts and Air	Abdur Rab Nishtar	All-India Muslim League
Law	Jogendra Nath Mandal	All-India Muslim League

== See also ==
- Central Legislative Assembly
- Council of State (India)
- Imperial Legislative Council
