= C. V. Seshadri =

Chemical engineer

Dr. Chetput Venkatasubban Seshadri (14 April 1930 – 17 September 1995) was a distinguished Indian chemical engineer who was chair of chemical engineering at IIT Kanpur. IIT Kanpur today has an endowed chair named for him, the C. V. Seshadri Professorship.

== Career ==
He received his PhD from Carnegie Mellon University, and was then at the Massachusetts Institute of Technology as a postdoctoral research associate. He started his independent academic career as an assistant professor of IIT Kanpur in 1965. Later he became a professor and finally the head of the Chemical Engineering Department of IITK. He also served as the dean of students' affairs at IITK.

He was the founding director of the Shri AMM Murugappa Chettiar Research Centre. During his tenure as a director, this Research Center won Jamnalal Bajaj Award for Application of Science and Technology for Rural Development in 1981.

In 2008, the C. V. Seshadri chair of professorship was instituted at the Indian Institute of Technology Kanpur. Prof. Yogesh M. Joshi is the present occupant of this chair.

== Family ==
He was a Calamur: brother to C. V. Ranganathan and C. V. Karthik Narayanan, brother-in-law to M. R. Srinivasan, cousin to Aryama Sundaram, Nanditha Krishna, and C. V. Karthikeyan, nephew of C. R. Pattabhiraman, grandson of Sir C. P. Ramaswami Iyer, grandnephew of Sir C.V. Kumaraswami Sastri and C.V. Viswanatha Sastri, and great-great-great-grandson of C. V. Runganada Sastri. Extended uncles include Shankaracharya Bharati Krishna Tirthaji, and C. Sivaramamurti.
