= Calamur Mahadevan =

Indian specialist in economic geology, marine geology, and nuclear geology

- Occupations: Geologist, Principal of Andhra University
- Relatives: Sir C. V. Kumaraswami Sastri; Sir C.P. Ramaswami Iyer
- Awards: Fellow of the Indian Academy of Sciences (FASc) Fellow of the National Academy of Sciences, India (FNASc); Fellow of the Indian National Science Academy (FNI); Fellow of the Indian Science Congress Association (FISC); Fellow of the Geological Society of India (FGS); Fellow of the Birbal Sahni Institute of Palaeosciences (F.Pb.S); Fellow of the Palaeontological Society of India (FPSI) President and Fellow of the Geological, Mining, Metallurgical Society of India (F.G.M.M.S.I.)

Academic background
- Education: University of Madras (M.A.); Indian Association for the Cultivation of Science (D.Sc)
- Doctoral advisor: Sir C.V. Raman
- Other advisors: Sir K.S. Krishnan; M. O. Parathasarathy Iyengar

Academic work
- Discipline: Geology
- Sub-discipline: Economic geology Marine geology Nuclear geology Ore dressing
- Institutions: Andhra University Massachusetts Institute of Technology; UNESCO; Council of Scientific and Industrial Research (CSIR) Atomic Energy Committee
- Notable students: U. Aswathanarayana; Bunyan Edmund Vijayam; T. C. Rao; B. P. Radhakrishna; K. Padmanabhaiah, Home Secretary

Calamur Mahadevan FNA FASc FNASc FNI FISC FGS F.Pb.S FPSI MAIME FGMMSI (6 May 1901 – 8 April 1962), sometimes known as C. Mahadevan, was an Indian specialist in economic geology, marine geology, and nuclear geology, and 1934 Founding Fellow of the Indian Academy of Sciences, elected for Earth and Planetary Sciences. He served on the Council of the Indian Academy of Sciences from 1948 until his death in 1962. Chosen as a Fulbright scholar, with aid from the United States National Research Council, he taught at the Massachusetts Institute of Technology. Appointed to the first Professorship of Geology at Andhra University after fourteen years as Superintendent Geologist at the Geological Survey of Hyderabad, he was known as a doyen or foundational figure in the field of Indian geology.

At Andhra University, where he was further appointed Principal, he introduced the subjects of Oceanography, Marine geology, Marine biology, Mineral processing, and nuclear geology as firsts in India, which some scholars trace to his time at MIT.

He was a major contributor to the Geological and Mineralogical Research Committee of the Council of Scientific and Industrial Research, and to the Nuclear Research Board of the Atomic Energy Committee, of which his cousin-in-law, M. R. Srinivasan was Chairman. He was additionally UNESCO's designated Expert in Geology, in relation to which he spent 1956-7 in Brazil. The Mahadevan International Centre for Water Resources Management was named in his honour, as was the Calamur Mahadevan Endowment Lecture of the Geological Society of India.

== Early life ==
He was born to Calamur Subrahmanya and C. Janaki, into the Calamur family, renowned for its scholarship, especially in Indian classics, and attended primary school in Buchireddypalem and in Madras, where he enrolled at Muthialpet High School. He earnt his M.A. in geology from the University of Madras in 1927 under Sir K. S. Krishnan, where his other teachers included T. N. Muthuswamy Iyer and M. O. P. Iyengar, and obtained his D.Sc. at the Indian Association for the Cultivation of Science under Sir C. V. Raman.

== Hyderabad Geological Survey ==
Mahadevan joined the Hyderabad State Geological Survey in 1931 as Assistant Superintendent, where he became a protege of Dr. Alexander M. Heron, recently retired as the Director of the Geological Survey of India.

== Family ==
As a Calamur, he was closely related to Sir C. V. Kumaraswami Sastri and Sir C. P. Ramaswami Iyer, among others. His sister Kanthammal Calamur married Dr. Cpt. Pennathur Krishnaswamy; their two daughters Saraswati and Kamakshi married Sir C.P.’s sons C. R. Pattabhiraman and C. R. Sundaram, whose respective granddaughter and son are Nanditha Krishna and C. Aryama Sundaram.

Mahadevan himself married Satyavati Rao, niece of V. N. Viswanatha Rao and Lakshmi Calamur Viravalli, daughter of Sir C. V. Kumaraswami Sastri. Satyavati's sister Lalitha and brother V. N. Krishna Rao both married Calamurs. Mahadevan's son Calamur Subrahmanyam, meanwhile married Lakshmi, daughter of C. R. Pattabhiraman and his first cousin Saraswati.
