= C. V. Runganada Sastri =

Indian interpreter, jurist, civil servant and polyglot

Calamur Viravalli Runganada Sastri
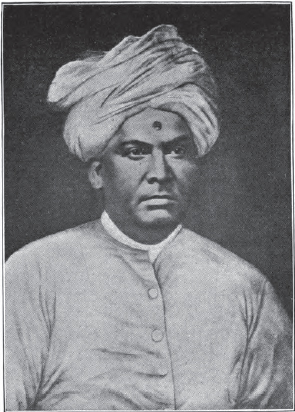
- Portrait of C. V. Runganada Sastri
- Born: 1819/1820; North Arcot, Madras Presidency
- Died: 5 July 1881; Madras
- Occupations: civil servant, judge
- Known for: polyglot, scholar
- Children: C.V. Sundara Sastri; P. Anandacharlu (adopted)

The Right Hon. Calamur Viravalli Runganada Sastri (c.15 February 1819/1820 – 5 July 1881) was an Indian interpreter, jurist, civil servant, polyglot, and social reformer, who was known for his mastery over Indian and foreign languages alike in both classical and vernacular forms, as well as his general erudition and command of jurisprudence. At his death, he is known to have mastered fourteen languages, and had a conversational command of at least two more.

In a time when higher positions were foreclosed to Indians, Sastri, in recognition of his brilliance, was nonetheless appointed a Fellow of the University of Madras, rapidly thereafter becoming the first native Indian appointed to the judicature as a judge of the Small Claims Court, and, ultimately, to the Legislative Council of Madras.

He was the first President of the revived Madras Native Association, and. a noted champion of women's rights, advocating female education and the reform of Hindu customary law and practice in child marriage, and founding the Hindu Widow Marriage Association with Sir T. Muthuswamy Iyer and Rai Raghunatha Rao in 1872 to promote widow remarriage.

He was progenitor of the Calamur Viravalli family of Iyer Brahmins, a line renowned for brilliance as jurists and Sanskritists which would go on to dominate the highest echelons of Indian law, as well as political administration and Hindu theology; similarly, he was the guru or teacher to many of the eminent Iyer and Deshastha Brahmin scholars who would go on to preeminence as civil servants and administrators.

== Early life ==
C.V. Runganada Sastri was born in a poor Hindu family from a village near Chittoor in the then North Arcot district in the year 1819. His father, Anantharama, was reputed to be one of the greatest Sanskrit scholars of the day, in the manner of his grandfather and great-grandfather, but initially could not afford to have him educated. Runganada Sastri began his education at home. By the time he was eight, he had become proficient in Sanskrit. The turning point in Sastri's life came with the arrest of his father for non-payment of land rent when the former was barely twelve years old. Sastri pleaded before the District Judge Casamajor requesting his father's temporary release from prison in order to participate in an annual religious ceremony offering himself as security on his father's behalf. Moved, Casamajor not only released Sastri's father but himself undertook to educate the boy.

C.V. Runganada Sastri was initially tutored in private by Casamajor and a Chittoor missionary H. Groves. Within six months, Sastri was able to read and write English. Under Groves' tutorship, Sastri evinced keen interest in mathematics and soon advanced to the study of astronomy. To further Sastri's studies, Casamajor sent Sastri to Madras in 1836 after persuading his parents with great difficulty. Runganada Sastri studied at Bishop Corrie's Grammar School from 1836 to 1839 and the High School (later, Presidency College, Madras) from 1839 to 1842, graduating with honours in 1842. His was a famously skilled class, with his friends, classmates, and pupils including the future Sir K. Seshadri Iyer, who would who govern Mysore as Diwan, and mentor Sastri's future son-in-law Sir C.P. Ramaswami Iyer; the future Raja Sir T. Madhava Rao, to whom he was tutor, who would successively govern Travancore, Baroda, and Indore as Diwan; Madhava Rao's cousin R. Raghunatha Rao, who would also govern as Diwan of Indore; another future Diwan of Travancore, V. Ramiengar; T. Muthuswami Iyer, who would become the first Indian justice of the High Court; Ramiengar's Vembaukum clan-cousin V. Sadagopacharlu, the first Indian advocate before the Court and member of the Madras Legislative Council; and P. Padasiva Pillai, who would become Supreme Justice of the High Court in Travancore, among others.

== Early career ==
Upon completion of his graduation, Sastri wanted to teach at the College of Engineering which was being planned. But the hostile attitude of the government, as well as his father's failing health, forced Runganada Sastri to return to Chittoor where he got a position as a clerk in the Subordinate Judge's Court at a salary of Rs. 70. During this time, Sastri displayed his rare aptitude for languages, mastering Telugu, Marathi, Hindustani, Persian and Kannada, in each of which he demonstrated himself to be unsurpassed in the reckoning when formally examined for the role of Chief Interpreter into the Supreme Court at Madras. Sastri was soon appointed Chief Interpreter at a pay of Rs. 2,000 - 2,500 a month. While serving as Chief Interpreter, Sastri mastered French and German, displaying his command of the former when some Francophones unexpectedly presented testimony to the court, despite no expectation that he would have the language, astonishing the Chief Justice, Sir Edward John Gambier, who extolled “the remarkable ease and accuracy with which he could speak French and German” in an encomium quoted in some of his obituaries.

In German, Sir P. S. Sivaswami Iyer further recorded the Hamburger Gustav Solomon Oppert, who arrived in 1872 from Oxford to take up the Professorship of Sanskrit and Comparative Philology, affirming his native-like facility with. In Latin, he favoured Cicero over all others, followed by Virgil, both featuring prominently in a personal library of some 3,000 foreign texts. At his death, he had mastered Arabic, Greek, and Italian, and had achieved proficiency in Hebrew, the latest language to fascinate him and his study; Nawab Sir Ahmed Husain Amin Jung Bahadur documented his engaging in academic theological and legal debate with learned Ulema in Arabic and Persian.

== Later career ==
When the University of Madras was established in 1857, Runganada Sastri was made the first and only Indian Governor of the Board and was also the sole Indian among the initial Fellows of the University. In April 1859, there was a vacancy in the Small Claims Court Bench and Runganada Sastri was appointed to the post by the then Governor of Madras Sir Charles Trevelyan after encountering heavy opposition and racial prejudice. Runganada Sastri served as a judge of the Small Claims Court from April 1859 until his retirement with a pension on 16 February 1880, whereupon he was appointed to the Madras Legislative Council. He died on 5 July 1881, reportedly holding a book.

== Family and descendants ==
Runganada Sastri's son C.V. Sundara Sastri was a celebrated lawyer of the High Court Bar who had four sons and a daughter. His grandsons Dewan Bahadur Sir C. V. Kumaraswami Sastri and Dewan Bahadur C.V. Viswanatha Sastri served as justices on the Madras High Court while his son-in-law Sir C. P. Ramaswami Iyer declined appointment to the High Court in favor, variously, of being the highest-remunerated private counsel in India, serving as Advocate-General of Madras and member of the Executive Councils of both the Governor of Madras and the Viceroy of India, before taking up the role of Dewan, regent, and enlightened despot of Travancore.

Among his great-grandsons, Venkataraman Sastri became Shankaracharya and pontiff of the Dwaraka Math for a brief stint, as Swami Bharati Krishna Tirtha Maharaj, before succeeding as supreme pontiff of the Govardhan Math and highest authority in Smarta Hinduism, in which capacity he would become the first Shankaracharya to visit the West, being additionally known for the formulation of Vedic mathematics; C. R. Pattabhiraman Iyer was an elected MP and served as Minister of Law and Justice under Indira Gandhi; while Dewan Bahadur V.N. Viswanatha Rao would serve as the Tehsildar of Tirunelveli, and later Finance Secretary of the Madras Presidency.

Other descendants include Aryama Sundaram, variously justice of the Supreme Court of India, Chief Justice of the Punjab and Haryana High Court, and justice of the Supreme Court of Singapore; C. V. Ranganathan, Joint Foreign Secretary and successive Indian Ambassador to the Soviet Union during Perestroika, Ambassador to China post Tiananmen Square, and France; archaeologist Sharada Srinivasan, as well as in-law M. R. Srinivasan, celebrated Chairman of the Atomic Energy Commission of India and Secretary of the Department of Atomic Energy, who was awarded the Padma Bhushan for his work with Homi J. Bhabha developing Apsara (disambiguation), the first Indian nuclear reactor, and then the Pressurized heavy-water reactor.
