= C. V. Ranganathan =

Indian diplomat and statesman

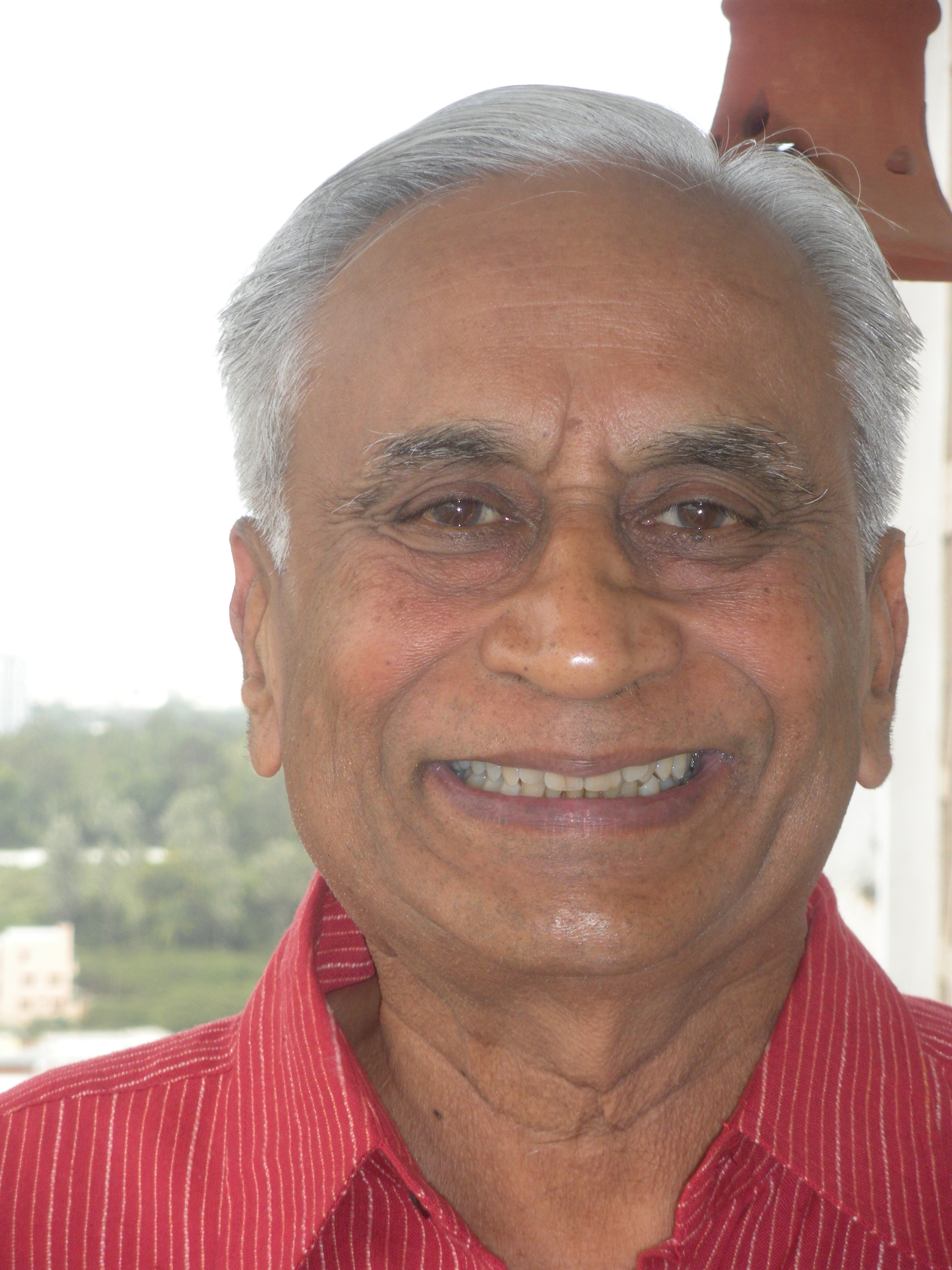
C.V. Ranganathan, former Indian diplomat

C. V. Ranganathan (born 1935) is an Indian diplomat and statesman, who variously served as Counselor of the Permanent Mission of India to the United Nations, Joint Foreign Secretary, First Secretary to the Embassy of India in Bonn, Indian High Commissioner to Hong Kong, Indian Ambassador to Ethiopia, and the Deputy Chief of Mission at the rank of ambassador to the Soviet Union during Perestroika.

He was then the Indian Ambassador to China, during which he oversaw Rajiv Gandhi's landmark 1988 state visit to Beijing, and Ambassador to France. Following his retirement from the Indian Foreign Service in 1993, he was a Jawaharlal Nehru Fellow and twice Convenor of India's National Security Advisory Board.

== Early life and education ==
Chetput Venkatasubban Ranganathan was born in Thoothukudi (formerly Tuticorin) in Tamil Nadu (formerly the Madras presidency) in colonial India. His ancestral place was the town of Chetput in the North Arcot district of the Madras Presidency. His grandfather was Sir C.P. Ramaswami Iyer, an Indian lawyer, administrator, and former Diwan of Travancore, who encouraged Ranganathan to sit the Indian Foreign Service (IFS) exam in 1959. His uncle C.R. Pattabhiraman participated in the Quit India Movement and was active in the Indian National Congress. Pattabhiraman was elected to the Lok Sabha from Kumbakonam in 1957 and 1962. Ranganathan's cousin Aryama Sundaram is a lawyer in the Supreme Court of India. C.R. Venkatasubban, Ranganathan's father, was chairman of the Imperial Tobacco Company (now ITC) in Bangalore. His siblings include the environmentalist Geetha Srinivasan, married to the late nuclear engineer Dr. M.R. Srinivasan; the late chemical engineer Dr. C.V. Seshadri; and the late automotive industrialist C.V. Karthik Narayanan.

Ranganathan completed his schooling in Madras and a B.A. (Hons.) in Economics and Political Science from Madras University. He successfully passed the IFS exam in 1959 and completed his training at the Lal Bahadur Shastri National Academy of Administration in Mussoorie. In 1962, he completed a Diploma with honors in Chinese language and literature at Hong Kong University, ultimately becoming fluent in spoken and written Mandarin Chinese through several subsequent stays in Hong Kong and Peking during the Cultural Revolution.

== Receiving His Holiness the Dalai Lama in India ==
On 31 March 1959, the 14th Dalai Lama of Tibet crossed the border from China into India at the Tawang pass in Arunachal Pradesh. A few days earlier, the Tibetan leader had sent a cable to the Indian prime minister Jawaharlal Nehru requesting asylum in India due to escalating repression by the Chinese government of Tibetan protestors. Tibetans suspected that the Chinese were setting a trap to detain the Dalai Lama, who then decided to preemptively flee to India. Nehru deputed the Assam Rifles and a group of Indian officers, including Ranganathan, to receive the Dala Lama and his entourage at Tawang, from where they eventually settled in Dharamsala, India. India saw an upsurge of Tibetan refugees in the aftermath of the Dalai Lama's asylum.

Ranganathan writes that this episode strained relations between India and China:

"...the unease with which the Chinese view the growing stature of the Dalai Lama, and the international sympathy which the situation of the Tibetans has evoked, leads the Chinese to frequently raise the matter in dialogues with Indian government leaders and officials. As for the Dalai Lama, he has abided by the universally acknowledged norms of shelter in India, which has been granted on humanitarian grounds. He has no support from the government of India in any political activity aimed against China. As for his ardent and numerous followers, the overwhelming majority live in India and are engaged in activities which are open to them in their capacity as refugees. Given India’s democratic system, it is unrealistic to expect that curbs can be put on their ability to assemble and give free rein to expression, provided such activities are within the bounds of Indian laws."

== Cultural Revolution in China ==
Ranganathan spent formative years in China shortly before and during the Cultural Revolution. He developed fluency in Mandarin Chinese, and a life-long scholarly interest in Chinese politics, political economy, and Sino-Indian relations, which he discusses in his speeches and publications, including his coauthored book with former ambassador Vinod C. Khanna, India and China: The Way Ahead After 'Mao's India War'.

In his memoirs, former ambassador of India, Kishan Rana, recalls that along with Ranganathan, nicknamed "Rangi", several IFS "probationers" (the term used for junior officers) chose to specialise in Chinese. They moved to Hong Kong during 1960-1962 for a two-year intensive Chinese language study. Rana mentions that during their two-year study, "Rangi moved out to spend a year as a paying guest with a Chinese professor." He adds "That arrangement worked well for Rangi’s language studies, but he found himself rather underfed much of the time, making up with street food and cheap restaurants, which were plentiful."

In 1962, the Sino-Indian War erupted over border disputes. Shortly after, Ranganathan returned to China during the Cultural Revolution as Third Secretary in the Embassy of India. During that time, tensions were also rising between India and China as part of the larger Sino-Soviet split due to suspicion by Mao that India was siding with the U.S.S.R., who Mao considered "revisionist" and too U.S.-friendly under Kruschev and his Cold War geopolitics. Indian newspaper The Hindu reported that Red Guards beat and kicked Indian diplomats at Peking airport on June 14, 1967 before they fled by air for Hong Kong after being expelled because they were accused of spying. According to The Hindu report, "C.V. Ranganathan was made to bow his head by the crowd who tried to force him to kneel on the runway." The report further states that "Red Guards waved red books of Mao Tse-tung’s quotations at the Indian diplomats."

These events of the 1960s had a chilling effect on relations between the two countries, breaking the relative peace established by the 1954 Panchsheel accords, which established "Hindi-Chini bhai bhai" (Hindi: हिंदी चीनी भाई भाई), or brotherly cooperation between the two countries that led to the launch of the Non-Aligned Movement and the 1955 Bandung Conference. Ranganathan explains the deterioration in Sino-Indian diplomatic relations as follows: "China’s material support to some militant elements in eastern India compounded with opportunistic friendship with Pakistan and the turmoils of the Cultural Revolution worsened an atmosphere vitiated by the 1962 war." This historical conjuncture drove Ranganathan's career-long scholarly interest in the Chinese Communist Party, Chinese foreign policy towards India, and dedication to normalising relations between India and China. Indian political scientist Surjit Mansingh writes "junior officers in the Ministry of External Affairs produced an accurate analysis of differences between the Soviet and Chinese Communist Parties in 1963. Each of these analysts, A.P. Venkateshwaran, J.N. Dixit, and C.V. Ranganathan, subsequently became very influential in shaping and executing Indian policies abroad."

== Indian Ambassador to Ethiopia ==
Between 1983-1985, Ranganathan served as Ambassador of India to Ethiopia. This was a time of the 1983–1985 famine in Ethiopia, which occurred during the reign of Mengestu Haile Mariam, chairman of the Marxist-Leninst military junta that ruled Ethiopia between 1977-1987. As part of his role as Indian ambassador, Ranganathan oversaw food and famine aid delivered by the Government of India to Ethiopia. Ranganathan also met with notable personalities during his time as ambassador in Addis, including Mother Teresa, who ran humanitarian programs in Africa, and the internationally-acclaimed Ethiopian artist Afewerk Tekle.

== Deputy Chief of Mission to the U.S.S.R at the rank of Ambassador ==
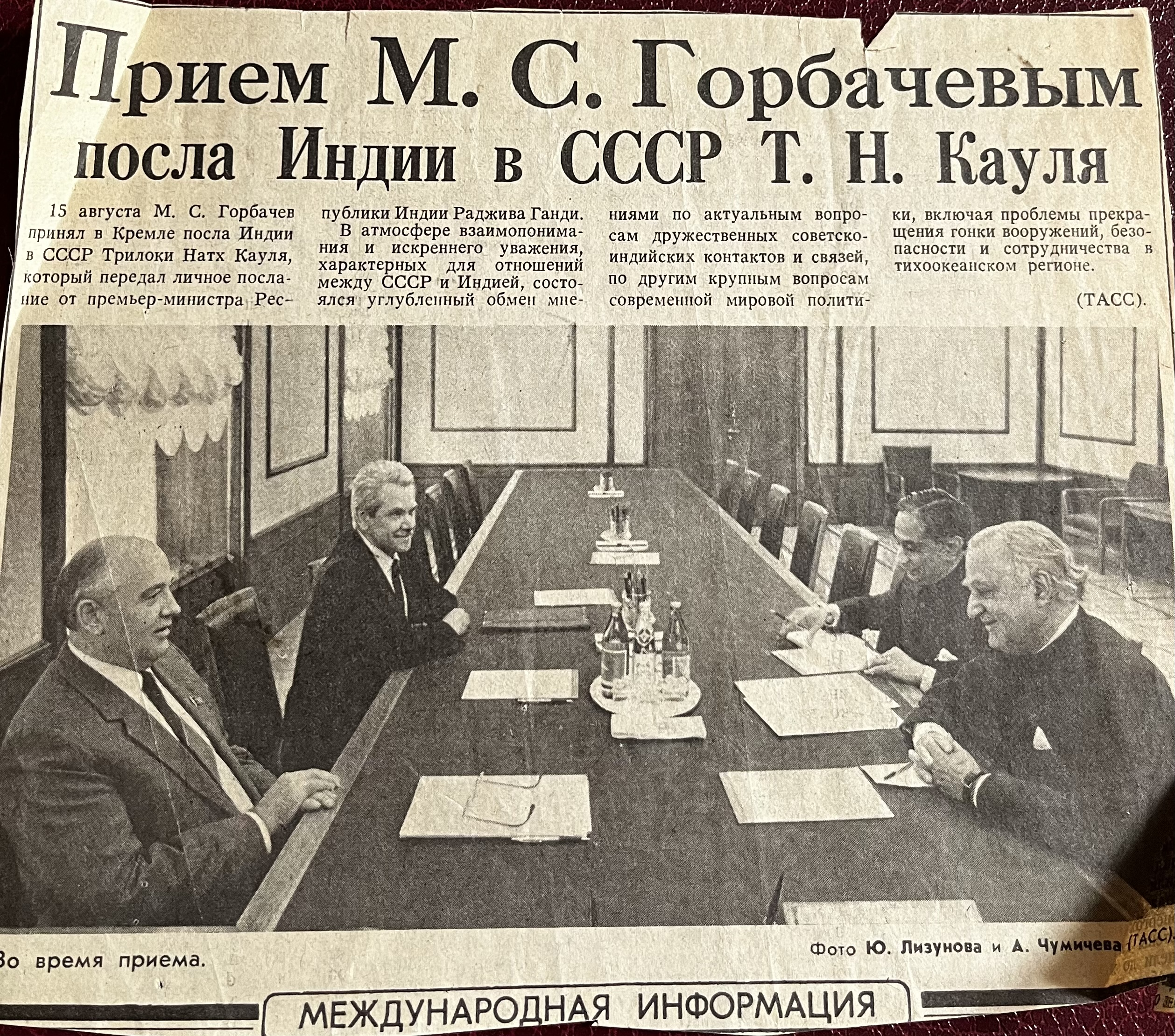
A 1985 Russian daily carried the article with title: "Reception of the Indian ambassador to the U.S.S.R T.N Kaul by M.S Gorbachev"

Between 1985-1987, Ranganathan served as Deputy Chief of Mission to the U.S.S.R at the rank of ambassador. A 1985 newspaper article with photograph shows Ranganathan seated next to Indian ambassador T.N. Kaul and both sitting opposite the last General Secretary of the Communist Party of the Soviet Union, Mikhail Gorbachev (1985-1991) and his deputy. During his years as the Soviet leader, Gorbachev initiated Perestroika, a wide-ranging plan for economic and political reform that culminated in the end of the Cold War, the fall of the Berlin Wall, and the dissolution of the U.S.S.R. and Eastern bloc communism.

== Indian Ambassador to China ==
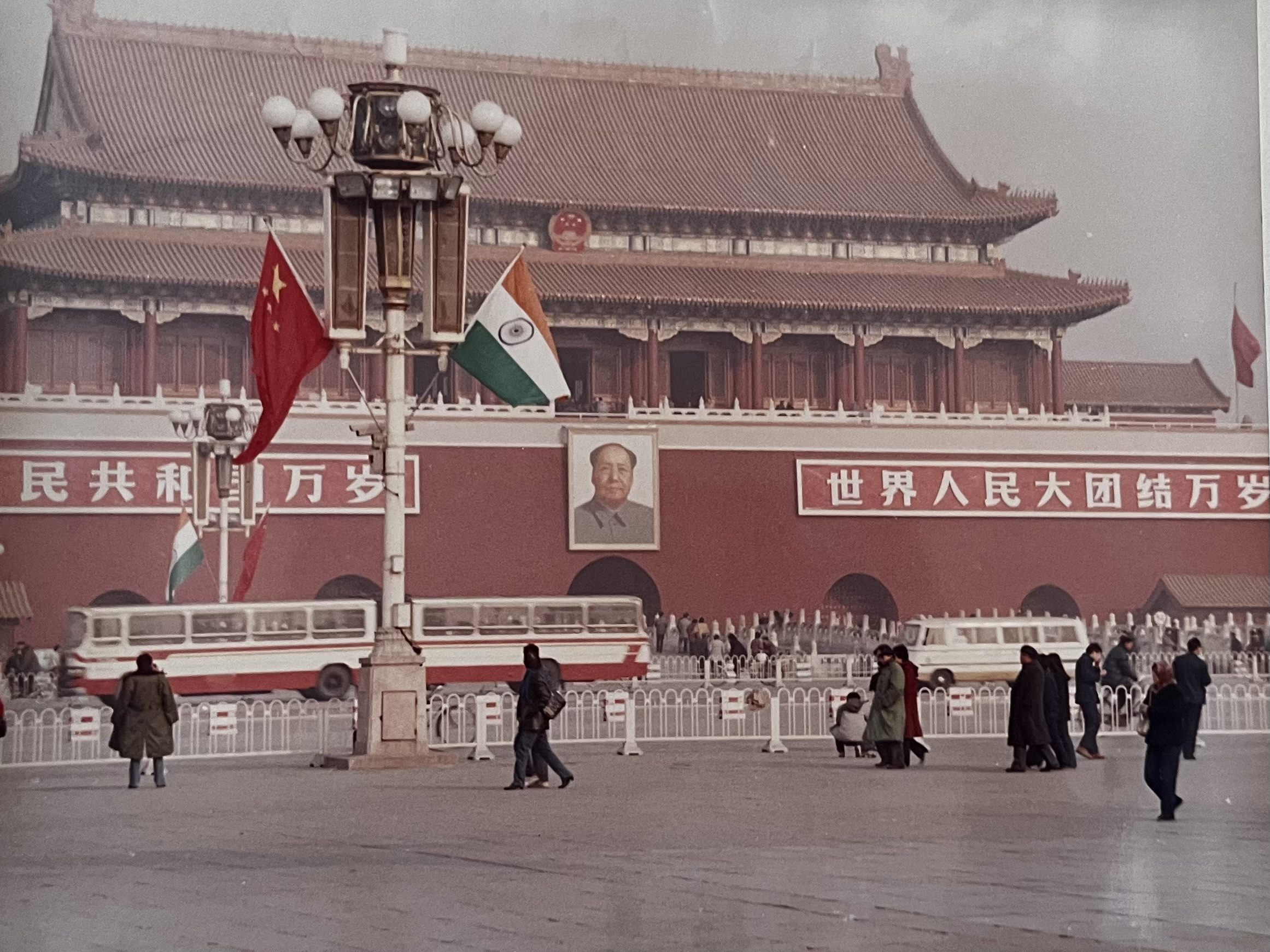
During Rajiv Gandhi's visit to China in 1988, Indian and Chinese flags hung side-by-side in Tiananmen Square

Between 1987-1991, Ranganathan served as Ambassador of India to China during which he coordinated a landmark "ice-breaking" visit by then Indian prime minister, Rajiv Gandhi, to China in 1988. Deng Xiao Ping was the paramount leader of the People's Republic of China at the time (1978-1989). This was the first visit by an Indian prime minister to China in over three decades following the Sino-Indian War of 1962 and a deterioration of relations under Mao. Rajiv Gandhi's 1988 visit had many achievements, including the creation of a Joint Working Group at the level of vice-ministers for negotiations on the boundary question and for strengthening peace; science and technology, aviation, and cultural cooperation; and high-level discussions between Gandhi, Deng, and party leaders, including Zhu Rongji. At one of the meetings, Deng stated emphatically that if India and China did not achieve development, talk of the 21st century being an Asian Century would not have any meaning.

Ranganathan was Indian ambassador when the 1989 Tiananmen Square protests and massacre erupted in Beijing. The Indian Embassy in China shares a compound wall with the British Embassy. When violence started to escalate and the People's Liberation Army imposed martial law, threatening to shoot violators and send in troops to crush the student resistance, a handwritten message on the door of the British Embassy warned: “Do not go on balconies, look out windows or take photographs of troops. They have warned they will shoot. They mean it.” Foreigners living in two large residential complexes a short distance away from the Indian and British embassies, Jianguomenwai and Qijiayuan, began to get increasingly nervous because of the presence of 20 Chinese military tanks positioned on a nearby highway intersection.

In his book Tiananmen Square: The Making of a Protest, Vijay Keshav Gokhale, who was then a junior diplomat in the Indian embassy, writes in the preface: "The book’s origins lie in the intensive discussions that happened among the Indian diplomats posted to the embassy in China. We were very fortunate to have the guidance and wisdom of C.V. Ranganathan, the ambassador, Shivshankar Menon, the deputy chief of mission, and Jayadeva Ranade, the senior intelligence officer. Their insights and analysis have helped me immensely to build the backbone of this book. I am deeply indebted to all three of them for instilling in me the art of China watching." He later narrates that Ambassador Ranganathan, in consultation with fellow diplomats, took the decision to evacuate the families and children in the embassy due to reports that the PLA had begun shooting at diplomatic compounds. A bullet found in the residence of an Indian diplomat prompted this decision:

"In the Indian embassy the ambassador [Ranganathan] convened a meeting to discuss the shooting incident. One of our officers, Political Attaché Sikri’s residence, had also been hit by bullets but the occupants of the apartment escaped unhurt. We took into account the visual scenes that many of us had witnessed in the past week. The ambassador was responsible for the safety of embassy personnel and staff, of course, but there were also other considerations in play. India–China relations had normalized after Prime Minister Rajiv Gandhi’s visit to China in December 1988. We had turned the page on one of the most painful chapters in our history – the military debacle of 1962. We could look ahead to better times. Any action we took which might look like we were joining the West in indicting the regime in China could complicate the restoration of normality. It was a long and hard discussion. Finally, we took the collective view that while it was our duty as officers of the government to remain in our posts, we could not risk the safety of families. It was decided that they would return to India on the next direct British Airways flight from Beijing to New Delhi."

== Personal life ==
In 1973, he met and married Vijayalakshmi Ranganathan (née Kumar) in New York City. Vijayalakshmi hails from a non-Brahmin Malayali Warrier caste. The marriage was unconventional, breaking the tradition of caste endogamous arranged marriages typical for Hindus. Like Ranganathan, who was Counselor of the Permanent Mission of India to the United Nations at the time, Vijayalakshmi was working in the United Nations as an officer of the United Nations Development Program. She was raised in Geneva by Malayali parents, and completed her education at Ecole Int, Geneva and the University of Edinburgh. They have two children, Arun Ranganathan born in 1975 in Bonn and Dr. Malini Rama Ranganathan born in 1979 in New Delhi. Arun works in software in New York and Dr. Malini Rama Ranganathan is a professor in Washington, DC. The family traveled together to each of Ranganathan's postings until he retired as Ambassador of India to France in 1993 and returned to New Delhi, where he continued to lecture and write for 12 years.

C.V. Ranganathan was an avid tennis and cricket player. While ambassador in China, he helped to organise and play in friendly cricket matches between different embassies (India, New Zealand, South Africa, Pakistan, United Kingdom, etc). He is fluent in Tamil, Hindi, and Chinese and, since 2005, lives in Bengaluru, India. In 2006, he delivered the 2nd General K.S. Thimayya Lecture in Bengaluru at Bishop Cottons Boys School.

== Publications ==
Ranganathan, C.V. and Vinod C. Khanna. 2000. India and China: The Way Ahead After Mao's 'India War.' Delhi: Har Anand Publications.

Ranganathan, C.V. 2004 "Facing Twenty-First Century Challenges On The Foundation Of Panchsheel", World Affairs: The Journal of International Affairs, Vol 8, No. 4 (October–December, pp. 11–17.

Ranganathan, C.V. and Sanjeev Kumar (eds). 2013. The 18th National Congress of the Communist Party of China: a major turning point for China.

== See also ==
Jagat Singh Mehta

A. P. Venkateswaran

Shivshankar Menon

Vijay Keshav Gokhale

Harsh Vardhan Shringla

Nirupama Rao

C.P. Ramaswamy Aiyer

C.R. Pattabhiraman
