= C. V. Kumaraswami Sastri =

Indian jurist, statesman and Sanskrit scholar

Diwan Bahadur Sir Calamur Viravalli Kumaraswamy Sastriyar Kt.

Puisne Justice of the High Court of Madras
- In office 1914–1930
- Governor: John Sinclair, 1st Baron Pentland Freeman Freeman-Thomas, 1st Marquess of Willingdon; George Goschen, 2nd Viscount Goschen George Frederick Stanley

Member of the Sedition Committee
- In office 1917–1919
- President: Sir Sidney Rowlatt
- Governor-General: Frederic Thesiger, 1st Viscount Chelmsford

Judge of Berhampur
- In office 1911–1914
- Governor: Sir Arthur Lawley; Sir Thomas David Gibson-Carmichael; John Sinclair, 1st Baron Pentland

Personal details
- Born: 19 July 1870 Madras, British India
- Died: 24 April 1934 (aged 63) Madras, British India
- Relations: C. V. Runganada Sastri (grandfather); P. Ananda Charlu (uncle C. V. Viswanatha Sastri (brother); C. P. Ramaswami Iyer (brother-in-law); V. N. Viswanatha Rao (son-in-law); V. N. Srinivasa Rao (grandson); Bharati Krishna Tirtha (cousin); Calamur Mahadevan (cousin)
- Children: C. V. Nagaraja Sastri; Laksmi Calamur Viravalli; C. V. Ekambara Sastri (blood nephew/adopted son)
- Parent: C. V. Sundara Sastri (father)
- Education: Presidency College; Madras Law College

Diwan Bahadur Sir Calamur Viravalli Kumaraswami Sastri Kt. (19 July 1870 – 24 April 1934) was an Indian jurist, statesman, and Sanskrit scholar who was leader of the Madras Bar as a Vakil of the High Court, before being appointed as a puisne justice of the Madras High Court in 1914, and, later, Chief Justice of the Madras High Court. He also served on numerous special committees; most notoriously, the Rowlatt Committee - service on which nearly imperiled his later service as Chief Justice. The great-grandson, great-great-grandson, and great-great-great-grandson of celebrated Sanskritists, he himself was noted for achieving "brilliant success, with speed" from his first days practicing law. In his heyday, he was considered "the most brilliant representative of the Madras Judicial Service", and the successor to V. Bhashyam Aiyangar.

== Family ==
He married his daughter Lakshmi to V. N. Viswanatha Rao, who would become Law, Education, and Finance Secretary of the Madras Presidency, as well as Collector of Tinnevelly and of Tanjore.

== Early life ==
Kumaraswami Sastri was born in Madras in 1870, the eldest son of C. V. Sundara Sastri. Kumaraswami Sastri was the grandson of C. V. Runganada Sastri, polyglot and one of the first Indians to serve in the Madras Legislative Council.

Kumaraswami Sastri graduated from the Presidency College and Law College, Madras, where he won the Elphinstone Thompson and Morehead Law scholarships. He also won the Innes Medal.

== Career ==
Sastri started his career as a lawyer of the Madras High Court in 1894 and was rapidly raised to the rank of Rao Bahadur After serving as a vakil, Sastri eventually became Judge of the Madras Small Causes Court. He was awarded the Diwan Bahadur title while serving as the District Judge of Berhampur in 1911, shortly before his elevation to the High Court,

In 1914, Sastri was appointed judge of the Madras High Court. He was a member of the infamous Sedition Committee - also known as Rowlatt committee - under Justice Sidney Rowlatt, which resulted in the infamous Rowlatt Act. He was knighted in the 1924 New Year Honours list.

In 1932 his criticism of rising education costs, delivered in a convocation address to the University of Mysore, drew attention. A paper of his averring that law was an impractical means of eradicating untouchability spurred commentary in the Harijan by Gandhi, who took him as the exemplar of 'Sanatanists', and a later monograph.

Following a paper by K. A. Nilakanta Sastri on the identity of Mahīpāla, the emperor lauded by Kṣemīśvara in the opening of the Caṇḍakauśika, in 1933 he dated the Sanskrit playwright Rājaśekhara to c. 850-920 AD, consequently identifying Mahīpāla as the Gurjara-Pratihara emperor of that name, and not Māhipala I of the Pala dynasty, as conjectured by Hara Prasad Shastri and accepted by R. D. Banerji and Jnan Chandra Ghosh. He collaborated with M. Hiriyanna, P. S. Subrahmanya Sastri and S. K. De in selecting and editing Sanskrit plays by Bhāsa, Śūdraka, Kālidāsa, Śrīharṣa, Bhavabhūti, and Viśākhadatta for an English-language anthology of translations, which was first published in the year of his death with his foreword as Tales from Sanskrit Dramatists: the Famous Plays.

== Death ==
Sastri died in Madras in 1934, aged 63.
