= C. V. Viswanatha Sastri =

Indian judge and statesman

Dewan Bahadur Calamur Viravalli Viswanatha Sastri was an Indian jurist and statesman who served as a justice of the High Court of the Madras Presidency, following and alongside his elder brother Dewan Bahadur Sir C. V. Kumaraswami Sastri. He was awarded the Kaisar-i-Hind Medal in 1934.

During Indian independence, he aroused controversy by his opposition to caste-based reservation policies and affirmative action.

Born into the Calamur Viravalli lineage of Vadadeśa Vadama Tamil Iyer Brahmins, he was a grandson to polyglot and judge C. V. Runganada Sastri, son to litigator C. V. Sundara Sastri, brother-in-law to Advocate-General and Travancore prime minister-regent Sir C.P. Ramaswami Iyer, uncle to Minister of Law C. R. Pattabhiraman, cousin to Shankaracharya Bharati Krishna Tirtha, C. Aryama Sundaram, and C. Sivaramamurti, among others. His great-grandson, fellow Madras High Court justice C. V. Karthikeyan, serves on that court today, marking six generations of Calamur Viravalli presence in the judiciary.
