= Seditious Meetings Act =

There are three legislation by the name of the Seditious Meetings Act, all created by the British Parliament.

- Seditious Meetings Act 1795
- Seditious Meetings Act 1817
- Seditious Meetings Act 1819

== See also ==
- Prevention of Seditious Meetings Act, 1907 - an act of the Imperial Legislative Council, the legislature for British India
