= U. Aswathanarayana =

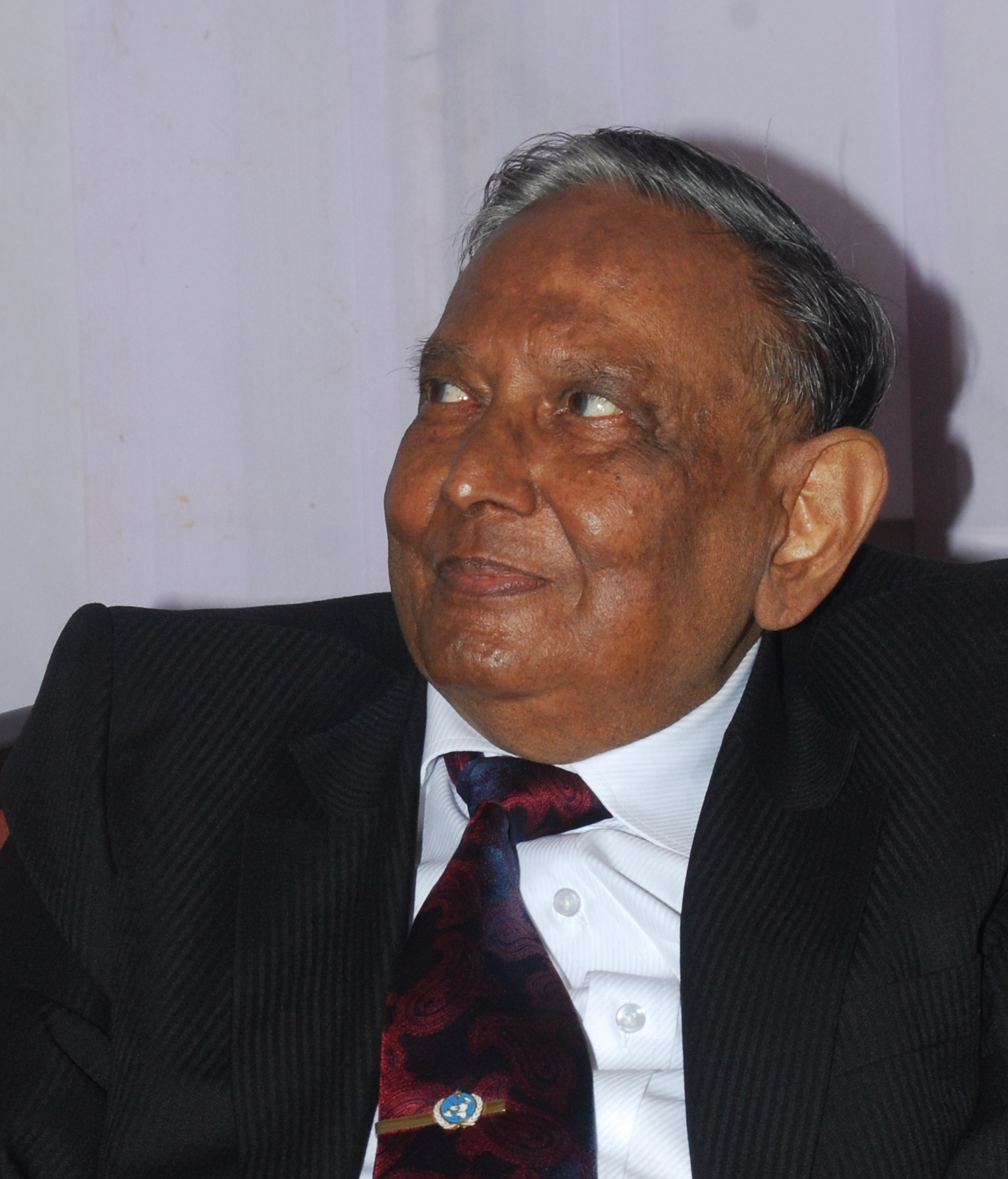
- Occupations: Geologist, Geochemist, Professor, Former Honorary director, Mahadevan International Centre for Water Resources Management, India
- Partner: Vijayalakshmi
- Awards: Excellence in Geophysical Education Award, AGU (2005), AGU International Award (2007)

Academic background
- Education: Andhra University
- Doctoral advisor: Calamur Mahadevan
- Other advisors: Arthur Holmes; J. Tuzo Wilson; Louis H. Ahrens; Clair Patterson; Stephen Moorbath

Academic work
- Discipline: Geology
- Institutions: Andhra University California Institute of Technology; Oxford University; University of Western Ontario; University of Sagar; University of Dar es Salaam Universidade Eduardo Mondlane

Uppugunduri Aswathanarayana (1 July 1928 – 6 March 2016) was the Honorary Director of the Mahadevan International Centre for Water Resources Management, India. He is counted among the doyens of geology in independent India and revered as a leading scientist from Andhra Pradesh.

He studied and taught geology at Andhra University; California Institute of Technology; Oxford University; University of Western Ontario; University of Sagar; University of Dar es Salaam, and Universidade Eduardo Mondlane. He has served as the Dean and Director of Centre for Advanced Study in Geology, University of Sagar, India; Head of Department of Geology, University of Dar es Salaam, Tanzania; Director, State Mining Corporation, Tanzania and Adviser on Environment and Technology, Mozambique. He also served as Consultant to UNDP, World Bank, Louis Berger Inc., and SIDA, while in Mozambique.

== Education ==
Aswathanarayana had a difficult childhood because of poverty. He was a student of the Municipal High School, Ongole, Andhra Pradesh, India. He nearly missed the mathematics examination in the Secondary School Leaving Certificate of the then Madras Presidency when he reached the examination hall 30 minutes late, as he had to walk barefoot in the hot sun for a considerable distance. He scored 100% marks in mathematics and set up a record for aggregate marks in the examination. Despite his meritorious performance in the high school, he almost gave up the idea of going to college because his parents could not afford it. Ultimately his mother had to sell whatever jewels she had to send him to college and then to university after a time gap.

It was the vision of his mentor, Prof. C. Mahadevan of Andhra University, that launched him on his doctoral studies in what later came to be known as nuclear geology. Geology in those days was just hammer and hand lens affair. He did doctoral research in radioactivity studies using the equipment that he built himself with the help of the Tata Institute of Fundamental Research, Mumbai. It was the first doctoral thesis on nuclear geology in India and was examined by Arthur Holmes, F.R.S. of UK, J. Tuzo Wilson, F.R.S., of Canada, and Louis Ahrens then at Oxford. Later he did post-doctoral work on lead isotopes with Clair Patterson in Caltech in 1957, and Rb – Sr and K – Ar dating with Stephen Moorbath in Oxford, England, in 1963.

== Career ==
In the course of a career of teaching, research and institutional capacity building spanning more than half a century, Aswathanarayana has been associated with Andhra University, Visakhapatnam, India, which was his alma mater; California Institute of Technology, Pasadena, California, USA; Oxford University, Oxford, England; University of Western Ontario, London, Canada; University of Saugar, Sagar, Madhya Pradesh, India; University of Dar es Salaam, Dar es Salaam, Tanzania, and Universidade Eduardo Mondlane, Maputo, Mozambique. He has served as the Dean and Director of Centre of Advanced Study in Geology, University of Sagar; Head of Department of Geology, University of Dar es Salaam; Director, State Mining Corporation, Tanzania and Adviser on Environment and Technology, Mozambique. He also served as Consultant to UNDP, World Bank, Louis Berger Inc., and SIDA, while in Mozambique. He was a UGC National Fellow, India (1976–79); UGC National Lecturer, India and UNIDO Consultant on Non-Metallic Minerals, Vienna (1988).

== Geoscience and social welfare ==
Aswathanarayana's exposure to the extremely severe human problems endemic in Africa convinced him of the need to switch to the application of geoscience to human welfare. Using geochemical and isotopic tools, he and his Tanzanian and Finnish associates could identify the pathways of geoenvironment-induced endemicity of diseases, such as fluorosis, stomach cancer and goitre. His most significant contribution to the advancement of science lay in the original way he did high – quality science in the process of developing paradigms for improving the quality of life of the ordinary people in Africa. Thus, his work entitled "Innovative use of people-participatory technologies for poverty alleviation and improvement of the quality of life in Chamanculo, a slum area near Maputo, Mozambique" has been chosen by the Third World Network of Scientific Organizations (now Consortium on Science, Technology and Innovation for the South), Trieste, Italy and UNDP, New York, as an outstanding example of "Innovation in Development in the Third World".

== Mahadevan International Centre for Water Resources Management ==
After returning to India, he got instituted the Mahadevan International Centre for Water Resources Management of which he has been the Founder and Honorary Director. The Centre was formally established on 6 May 2001, with the co-operation of Prof. G.O.P. Obasi, the then Secretary-General, WMO, Geneva. The purpose of the Centre is to serve as a clearinghouse for water sciences and technologies in the developing countries. It is modelled after the Abdus Salam ICTP, Trieste, Italy, in its ethos, and mode of functioning. Like ICTP, the Mahadevan Centre offers a series of customised courses for the water scientists, technologists and managers from the developing countries.

== Honours and awards ==
Aswathanarayana is recipient of the Excellence in Geophysical Education Award (2005; International Award ( 2007) of the American Geophysical Union Certificate of Recognition (2007) of the International Association of GeoChemistry; and Eminent Citizen Award in the area of Water Sciences of the Sivananda Trust, India (2007).

== Other mentions ==
Aswathanarayana served as general secretary, Geological Society of India (1976–1979), Chairman, Working Group on Isotope Geochemistry of IAGC(1979–1983), Leader, IAVCEI W.G. on Deccan Volcanism (1979–83) and Chairman of the Working Group on "Geochemical Training in Developing Countries" of the International Association of Geochemistry and Cosmochemistry (1996–2008). He was UNESCO Expert affiliated to the Institute for Trace Element Research, Lyon, France (1991).

== Publications ==
Aswathanarayana is the author of over 100 original scientific papers and ten books. His first book, Principles of Nuclear Geology (A.A. Balkema, Netherlands, 1986), was followed by a quartet of books on the ecologically sustainable and employment-generating use of natural resources: Geoenvironment: An Introduction (A.A. Balkema, Netherlands, 1995), Soil Resources and the Environment (Science Publishers, Enfield, USA, 1999), Water Resources Management and the Environment (A.A. Balkema, 2001), Mineral Resources Management and the Environment (A.A. Balkema, 2003).

The Geological Society of India, Bangalore, has brought out his popular science booklet, "Natural Resources and Environment", (2003) which has been translated into Indian languages. Advances in Water Science Methodologies (2005), The Indian Ocean Tsunami (2006), Food and Water Security (2008), "Energy Portfolios" (2009) are some of his recent books. His recent books, Green Energy: Technology, Economics and Policy and Natural Resources – Technology, Economics & Policy, are published by Taylor & Francis of the UK.
