= Apsara (disambiguation) =

An Apsara is a female spirit from Hindu and Buddhist mythology.

Apsara may also refer to:

== Arts, entertainment, and media ==
=== Fictional characters ===
- Vina Apsara, a character in Salman Rushdie's novel The Ground Beneath Her Feet

=== Films ===
- Apsara (film), a 1966 Khmer film directed by Head of State Norodom Sihanouk
- Apsarassu, 1990 Indian Malayalam-language film
- Aadmi Aur Apsara, Hindi title for Jagadeka Veerudu Athiloka Sundari, a 1990 Indian Telugu-language film
- Apsara (2002 film), a 2002 Indian Malayalam-language film starring Reshma

=== Television ===
- Apsara (TV series) a 2026 Indian Hindi-language television series

=== Other arts, entertainment, and media ===
- Apsara Dance, a dance of the Royal ballet of Cambodia
- Producers Guild Film Awards, formerly known as the Apsara Awards, Indian film and television awards

== Geography ==
- APSARA, the Authority for the Protection and Management of Angkor and the Region of Siem Reap
- Apsarasas Kangri, mountain of the Karakoram
- Apsarkonda, village in Karnataka, India

== People ==
- Apsara Iyer, American legal scholar and art crime investigator
- Apsara Rani, Indian actress
- Apsara Reddy, Indian transgender politician
- Apsara Sakbun, American-Cambodian s

== Other uses ==
- Apsara, a technology stack for Alibaba Cloud
- Apsara, India's first nuclear reactor at the Bhabha Atomic Research Centre
- Apsara International Air, Cambodian airline operating 2013-2016
- Apsarasa, a genus of moths in the family Noctuidae
