= C. R. Pattabhiraman =

Indian lawyer and politician (1906–2001)

Minister of Law and Company Affairs
- In office 1966–1967
- Prime Minister: Indira Gandhi

Member of Parliament (Lok Sabha) for Kumbakonam
- In office 1957–1967
- Prime Minister: Jawaharlal Nehru; Lal Bahadur Shastri; Indira Gandhi
- Preceded by: C. Ramaswamy Mudaliar
- Succeeded by: Era Seziyan

Personal details
- Born: 11 November 1906 Madras, India
- Died: 19 June 2001 (aged 94) Chennai, Tamil Nadu
- Party: Indian National Congress
- Spouse: Saraswathi (1925-84; her death)
- Children: Shakunthala Jagannathan, Seetha Tyagarajan, Lakshmi Subrahmanyam, Padmini Balagopal
- Profession: lawyer

Chetput Ramaswami Pattabhiraman (11 November 1906 – 19 June 2001) was an Indian lawyer and politician from the Indian National Congress. He was the eldest son of Indian statesman C. P. Ramaswami Iyer. He served as a Member of Indian Parliament from Kumbakonam from 1957 to 1967 and as a Union Minister from 1966 to 1967.

== Early life and education ==
Pattabhiraman was born on 11 November 1906 to C. P. Ramaswami Iyer and his wife Seethamma. Madras High Court Justices Diwan Bahadur Sir C. V. Kumaraswami Sastri and Diwan Bahadur C. V. Viswanatha Sastri were his maternal uncles; C. V. Runganada Sastri was his maternal great-grandfather. As Pattabhiraman was born after a Naga Prathistha yagna or a sacrifice to the Hindu god Nāga by Seethamma who had earlier suffered two miscarriages, Pattabhiraman was initially named Nagarajan. He was born a day before his father's 27th birthday.

Pattabhiraman had his schooling from the P. S. Higher Secondary School, Mylapore, Madras and graduated from Presidency College, Madras. He did his LL. B at the London School of Economics and Political Science and qualified for the bar from the Middle Temple in 1932. Pattabhiraman practised as an advocate after his graduation and in 1938, became an advocate of the Federal Court, Delhi, now the Supreme Court of India.

== Politics ==
Pattabhiraman was a member of the Indian National Congress from his early days. He participated in the boycott of the Simon Commission and the activities of the India League. He was elected to the Lok Sabha in 1957 and 1962 from Kumbakonam. In May 1962, Pattabhiraman was appointed Deputy Minister for Labour, Employment and Planning by the then Prime Minister Jawaharlal Nehru and served as the Deputy Minister for Information and Broadcasting from 15 June 1964 to 24 January 1966. He also served as a Minister for Law and Company Affairs from 25 January 1966 till his resignation in 1967. Pattabhiraman lost the 1967 elections from Kumbakonam and retired from politics.

== Sports ==
Pattabhiraman was an excellent sportsman and a patron of sporting championships. He established the Mylapore Recreation Club and along with P. Subbarayan, founded the Madras Cricket Association.

== Death ==
Pattabhiraman died in his sleep on 19 June 2001 at the age of 94.

== Family ==
Pattabhiraman's father, Sir C. P. Ramaswami Iyer was one of India's front ranking statesmen and at the time of his birth, the lawyer with the highest income in India. On 26 January 1925, Pattabhiraman married Saraswathi, the daughter of Captain Dr. P. Krishnaswami, Principal of Stanley College, and Kanthammal Calamur, niece of both Pennathur Subramania Iyer, founder of P. S. High School, and Calamur Mahadevan. Saraswathi's sister would marry Pattabhiraman's brother C. R. Sundaram Iyer. Pattabhiraman and Saraswathi had four daughters - Shakunthala (1927-2000), mother of Nanditha Krishna; Seetha (1933-1958); Lakshmi and Padmini. Lakshmi would go on to marry Calamur Mahadevan's son Calamur Subrahmanyam, whose mother, Satyavathy Rao, was niece to V. N. Viswanatha Rao and Lakshmi Calamur Viravalli Kumaraswami Sastri.
