= Rowlatt Act =

Government act passed in 1919 by the British in India

Anarchical and Revolutionary Crimes Act, 1919

Imperial Legislative Council
- Long title: An Act to cope with anarchical and revolutionary crime.
- Citation: Act No. 11 of 1919
- Territorial extent: the whole of British India
- Passed: 18 March 1919
- Assented to by: Governor-General Lord Chelmsford
- Assented to: 21 March 1919

Repealed by
- Special Laws Repeal Act, 1922 (4 of 1922)
- Status: Repealed

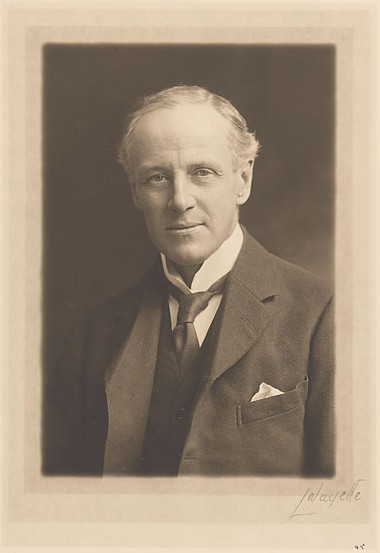
Sidney Rowlatt, best remembered for his controversial presidency of the Rowlatt Committee, a sedition committee appointed in 1917 by the British Indian Government to evaluate the Indian independence movement and political terrorism in India.

The Rowlatt Act, officially known by its parliamentary short title as the Anarchical and Revolutionary Crimes Act 1919, was an act passed by the Imperial Legislative Council in Delhi on 18 March 1919 to strong opposition of its Indian members, indefinitely extending the emergency measures of preventive indefinite detention, imprisonment without trial and judicial review enacted in the Defence of India Act, 1915 during the First World War. It was enacted in the light of a perceived threat from revolutionary nationalists of re-engaging in similar conspiracies as had occurred during the war which the government felt the lapse of the Defence of India Act, 1915 would enable.

== Purpose and introduction ==
The British Colonial Government passed the "Rowlatt Act", which gave power to the police to arrest any Indian person on the basis of mere suspicion. The purpose of the Act was to curb the growing nationalist upsurge in the country. Muhammad Ali Jinnah called this act a "Black Act" in his letter to Viceroy of India, Frederic Thesiger, when he (Jinnah) resigned from the Imperial Legislative Council. Mahatma Gandhi called upon the people to perform Satyagraha against this act. Passed on the recommendations of the Rowlatt Committee and named after its president, Sir Sidney Rowlatt, the act effectively authorized the colonial British government to imprison any person suspected of terrorism living in British India for up to two years without trial, and gave the colonial authorities power to deal with all revolutionary activities.

The unpopular legislation provided for stricter control of the press, (Note: As per Section 15, at any trials conducted under Part 1 of the Article, the accused may be charged with and convicted of any offense against any provision of law which is referred to in the Schedule. Section 124-A of IPC, 1860 (Sedition) is one of the Sections mentioned under Section 2 of the Schedule.) arrests without warrant, (Note: As mentioned in clause (a) of Sub-section 1 of Section 34 of Rowlatt Act, provided conditions for the application of Part 3 are met. As per Sub-section 2, the arrest of any such person can be effected at any place where he may be found by any government officer. Section 35 further directs that any person making an arrest under clause (a) of Sub-section 1 of the previous article shall immediately report the arrest to the Local Government. Pending receipt of orders of government, the person is to be detained in custody for a maximum of 7 days, which could be extended to 15 days as per the direction of the Local Government.) indefinite detention without trial, and juryless in camera trials for proscribed political acts. (Note: Stated in Sub-section 2 of Section 26 as follows- "The investigating authority shall then hold an inquiry in-camera for the purpose of ascertaining what, in its opinion, having regard to the facts and circumstances adduced by the Government, appears against the person in respect of whom the order has been made." Section 30 states that the investigating authority shall consist of 3 persons, of whom 2 shall be persons having held judicial office not inferior to that of a District and Sessions Judge, and one shall be a person not in the service of the Crown in India.) The accused were denied the right to know the accusers (Note: Stated in Clause (b) of sub-section 2 of Section 26 as follows- "The investigating authority shall not disclose to the person in question any fact the communication of which might endanger the public safety or the safety of any individual:") and the evidence used in the trial. (Note: Stated in Sub-section 3 of section 26 as follows- "Subject to the provisions of sub-section (2) the inquiry shall be conducted in such manner as the investigating authority considers best suited to elicit the facts of the case: and in making the inquiry, such authority shall not be bound to observe the rules of the law of evidence.") A special panel, made up of three high court judges, was designated to hear cases involving such suspects. This panel served as the final authority, with no higher court available for appeal. The law of habeas corpus was suspended. Furthermore, it possessed the power to admit evidence that would not be permissible under the standard rules of the Indian Evidence Act. Those convicted were required to deposit securities upon release, and were prohibited from taking part in any political, educational, or religious activities. On the report of the committee, headed by Justice Rowlatt, two bills were introduced in the Central Legislature on 6 February 1919. These bills came to be known as "Black Bills". Despite much opposition, the Anarchical and Revolutionary Crimes Act, 1919 was passed on 18 March 1919. Under the act the chief justice was empowered to decide on the immediate custody of the accused between the trial and release on bail for smooth implementation of the act. The act also provides a penalty for disobedience of any order promulgated.

== Effect ==
Madan Mohan Malaviya, Mazarul Haque and Muhammad Ali Jinnah, a member of the All-India Muslim League resigned from the Imperial legislative council in protest against the act. Muhammad Ali Jinnah called it a "Black Act" in his resignation letter from Imperial Legislative Council to the Frederic Thesiger, then-Viceroy of India. Mahatma Gandhi, among other Indian leaders, (Note: Including, but not limited to, Vallabhbhai Patel, Madan Mohan Malviya) was extremely critical of the Act and argued that not everyone should be punished in response to isolated political crimes. The act also infuriated many other Indian leaders and the public, which caused the government to implement repressive measures. Gandhi and others thought that constitutional opposition to the measure was fruitless, so on 6 April, a hartal took place. This was an event in which Indians suspended businesses and went on strikes and would fast, pray and hold public meetings against the 'Black Act' as a sign of their opposition and civil disobedience would be offered against the law. Mahatma Gandhi bathed in the sea at Mumbai and made a speech before a procession to Madhav Baug temple took place. This event was part of the Non-cooperation movement. One of the largest protests occurred in Ambala, Punjab Province in early 1919 under the chairmanship of the lawyer Jhanda Singh Giani.

It was the Rowlatt Act which brought Gandhi to the mainstream of the Indian struggle for independence and ushered in the Gandhian Era of Indian politics. Jawaharlal Nehru described Gandhi's entry into the protests in his Glimpses of World History:

Early in 1919 he was very ill. He had barely recovered from it when the Rowlatt Bill agitation filled the country. He also joined his voice to the universal outcry. But this voice was somehow different from others. It was quiet and low, and yet it could be heard above the shouting of the multitude; it was soft and gentle, and yet there seemed to be steel hidden away somewhere in it; it was courteous and full of appeal, and yet there was something grim and frightening in it; every word used was full of meaning and seemed to carry a deadly earnestness. Behind the language of peace and friendship there was power and quivering shadow of action and a determination not to submit to a wrong...This was something very different from our daily politics of condemnation and nothing else, long speeches always ending in the same futile and ineffective resolutions of protest which nobody took very seriously. This was the politics of action, not of talk.

However, the success of the hartal in Delhi, on 30 March, was overshadowed by tensions running high, which resulted in rioting in the Punjab, Delhi and Gujarat. Deciding that Indians were not ready to make a stand consistent with the principle of nonviolence, an integral part of satyagraha (disobeying the British colonial government's laws without using violence), Gandhi suspended the resistance.

The Rowlatt Act came into effect on 21 March 1919. In Punjab the protest movement was very strong, and on 10 April, two leaders of the congress, Dr. Satyapal and Saifuddin Kitchlew, were arrested and taken secretly to Dharamsala. On 13 April people from neighbouring villages gathered for Baisakhi Day celebrations and to protest against their deportation in Amritsar. Subsequently, the army was called into Punjab, which resulted in the Jallianwala Bagh massacre of 1919.

== Revocation ==
Accepting the report of the Repressive Laws Committee, the British colonial government repealed the Anarchical and Revolutionary Crimes Act, 1919, the Indian Press Act, 1910, Regulation III of 1818, the Passport Act, the Sedition laws (Section 124A of the IPC), the Official Secrets Act, the Criminal Law Amendment Acts of 1908 and 1913, the Explosive Substances Act, the Seditious Meetings Act, the Indian Arms Act, the Prevention of Seditious Meetings Act, the Police Act, 1861, the Public Safety Act, the Defence of India Act, 1915, the Cantonments Act, the Indian Newspapers (Incitement to Offences) Act, the Indian Criminal Law Amendment Ordinance, the Indian States Protection Act, the Press Emergency Powers Act, the Emergency Powers Ordinance, the Indian Political Service Regulations, the Criminal Tribes Act, and the Section 144 of the Criminal Procedure Code (CrPC) in March 1922.

== See also ==
- Champaran Satyagraha and Kheda Satyagraha
- Non-cooperation movement
