= C. Sivaramamurti =

Indian museologist, art historian and epigraphist

Calambur Sivaramamurti
- Occupations: Art historian, art critic, epigraphist, philologist, museologist, archaeologist, numismatist, Sanskrit scholar, literary critic
- Awards: Padma Shri Padma Bhushan; Fellow of the Royal Asiatic Society; Jawaharlal Nehru Fellow Vicitracitta

Academic work
- Institutions: Madras Museum Archaeological Survey of India; National Museum of India International Committee of Museums
- Notable works: L'Art en Inde Nataraja in Art, Thought, and Literature; Amaravati Sculptures In The Madras Government Museum; South Indian Paintings; South Indian Bronzes; Citrasūtra of the Sanskrit literature and art: mirrors of Indian culture

Vicitracitta Calambur Sivaramamurti FRAS (1909–1983) was an Indian museologist, art historian and epigraphist who is primarily known for his work as curator in the Government Museum, Chennai, previously known as Madras Museum. and Sanskrit scholar. His entire life was devoted to the study and exposition of various aspects of Indian art. Apart from authoring several monographs, and guide books on Indian art, he also wrote a seminal work on South Indian epigraphy.

He received the Padma Shri and Padma Bhushan, and was selected as the inaugural and prototype Jawaharlal Nehru Fellow. He was additionally an honorary Fellow of the Royal Asiatic Society of Great Britain and Ireland and a Fellow of the Lalit Kala Akademi. Shankaracharya Chandrashekarendra Saraswati created him Vicitracitta as a personal honour. He was a member of the Calamur family.

== Career ==
After a brilliant academic career, C. Sivaramamurti entered the museum profession as curator for Archaeology in the Madras Museum. He then joined the Archaeological Survey of India as Superintendent, Archaeological Section, Indian Museum, Calcutta, whence he came over to the National Museum as Keeper and rose as Assistant Director and finally became the Director. Closely associated with the International Council of Museums he was on its executive committee and was Chairman of the Indian National Committee of ICOM. He conducted pioneering research and wrote extensively on various subjects during his tenure at the Indian national Museum.

Eminent archaeologist, zoologist and student of archaeology, Frederic Henry Gravely, along with the Curator Dr. C. Sivaramamurti, ensured in 1938 that the antiquities and industrial art collected by the Museum was organised effectively, into a collection that exists even today. His monumental book L'Art en Inde originally published in French earned the Dadabhai Naoroji Award. The book is available in German, English, Spanish and Italian. Dr.C.Sivaramamurti was the first fellow of the Jawaharlal Nehru Memorial Fundwhen it was instituted, as he was specially chosen by the Trustees of this Fund in an endeavour to set a standard to Indian scholarship. He did a special exhaustive study of Nataraja, the dancing form of Siva, in all aspects as represented in Art, thought and literature. The product of two years of efforts was a monumental work,"Nataraja in Art, Thought and Literature", which he dedicated to his parents. Nataraja in Art, Thought and Literature is acclaimed as his major achievement. First published 1974, it was 412 pages with 22 colour plates and over 250 monochrome illustrations. Nataraja as a theme represents life force itself. The ancients visualised Nataraja as a manifestation of the cosmic energy symbolising the three aspects of creation, preservation and destruction. Chapters include: Natya, The Significance of Siva's Dance, Karanas Presented in Siva's Tandava, Karanas Presented by Vishnu as Krishna, The Vedic Roots of the Concept of The Great Dancer, Nataraja Pictured in literature, Varieties of Nataraja as Described in Silpa Texts, Nataraja Form in Sculpture and Painting, The Nataraja Concept Beyond Indian Frontiers.

The dance of Nataraja has always been synonymously viewed with truth and beauty, force and rhythm, movement and change, realisation and dissolution. Nataraja has been visualised in various forms by seers, poets and artists; it has been chiselled, painted, described and sung about in many parts of India and countries. This itself is a testimony to the twin aspects of time and timelessness of Nataraja, both as a personality and as a theme. This book highlights Nataraja as the presiding deity of fine arts whether it be music, dance, painting, sculpture or epigraphy. The Vedic roots of the cosmic dancer and the blend of tradition and modernity is woven as a thread throughout the book describing vividly the exploits of the great dancer on world stage. It also contains interesting information on famous spots of the Nataraja theme and the concept of Nataraja beyond Indian frontiers. Dr. Sivaramamurti has been one of the most acclaimed art historians of this country. He had devoted an entire lifetime to iconography, especially to the Nataraja theme. This book was an outcome of his research as part of the Jawaharlal Nehru Fellowship awarded to him in 1968. In her foreword to this book, Mrs. Indira Gandhi called it 'a monument to Indian Scholarship.'

Sivaramamurti combined literature with epigraphy, numismatics, sculpture, and painting by exploring artistic traditions in tandem with Sanskrit literature. As the son of civil administrator and Sanskrit scholar Calambur Sundara Sastri, who wrote the Sanskrit epic Sundara Ramayana, he belonged to the lineage of philosopher Appayya Dikshita. He married Sampurna, granddaughter of Ramayana expert Paruthiyur Krishna Sastri and daughter of Pattabhi Rama Sastri, District Educational Officer of Tanjore. They have two children, Sundararamamurti and Krishnamurti.

== Death ==
Dr. Sivaramamurti died in 1983 of a heart attack during a lecture on the specific features of a rare Nataraja icon.

Dr. Sivaramamurti is an Honorary Fellow of the Royal Asiatic Society of Great Britain and Ireland. Sri Sankaracharya the great Chandrasekharendra Saraswati Swamigal of Kanchi Kamakoti Peetha conferred on him the title of Vichitrachitta- meaning 'the curious minded one'. The great Pallava ruler of the 8th century from southern India, Mahendravarman, held this epithet 'vichitrachitta', as described by him in his inscription in the rock-cut temple of the Trinity, Brahma, Vishnu and easwara (siva) at Kudumiamalai. He was awarded by the President of India, the Padma Sri in 1968 and the Padma Bhushan in 1975. He travelled widely, participated in international seminars, delivered important lectures at the invitation of several universities, which have been published as books. He delivered important endowment lectures at many universities in India. He has over thirty-four books and innumerable papers on sculpture, painting, architecture, iconography, epigraphy, numismatics and literature to his credit. He was honoured with a number of awards during his lifetime, and in view of his contribution to Oriental Research, in 1981, the Asiatic Society of Bombay posthumously awarded a special Campbell Memorial Gold Medal.

== Works ==
- Mahabalipuram (1952)
- Early Eastern Chalukya Sculpture (1962)
- Indian Epigraphy and South Indian Scripts (1966)
- Nataraja in Art, Thought, and Literature (1974)
- L'Art en Inde (1974)
- Chitrasutra of the Vishnudharmottara (1978)
- Kalugumalai and Early Pandyan Rock-cut Shrines
- Sanskrit Literature and Art: Mirrors of Indian Culture
- La stupa du Barabudur (in French)
- An Album of Indian Sculpture
- Rishis in Indian art and literature
- Royal conquests and cultural migrations in South India and the Deccan
- Vijayanagara paintings
- Numismatic parallels of Kalidasa
- Sculpture inspired by Kalidasa
- Sri Lakshmi in Indian art and thought
- Ramo Vigrahavan dharmah-Rama embodiment of righteousness
- Birds and animals in Indian sculpture
- Sanskrit literature and art
- Mirrors of Indian culture
- Satarudriya – Vibhuti of Siva's Iconography
- Panorama of Jain art
- Shiva
- Ethical fragrance in Indian art and literature
- Indian Painting
- Approach to nature in Indian art and thought
- The art of India
- Expressive Quality of Literary flavour in Art
- Early Andhra Arts and Iconography
- Indian Bronze
- The Chola temples: Thanjavur, Gangaikondacholapuram & Darasuram
- Early eastern Chalukya sculpture
- Harappan Art
- Indian epigraphy and South Indian scripts
- Bhagavatpada-Sri Sankaracharya
- Epigraphical echoes of Kalidasa
- 5000 years of the art of India: with Mario Bussagli
- An Introduction to South Indian Temple Architecture and Sculptures, co-authored with F. H. Gravely
- Illustrations of Indian Sculptures, co-authored with F. H. Gravely
- Guide to the Archaeological Galleries, co-authored with F.H.Gravely
- Notes on Hindu Images, co-authored with F. H. Gravely
