= P. G. N. Unnithan =

Diwan of Travancore (1898–1965)

Rajyasevapraveena P. G. N. Unnithan

Diwan of Travancore
- In office 19 August 1947 – 24 March 1948
- Monarch: Chithira Thirunal Balarama Varma
- Preceded by: C. P. Ramaswami Iyer
- Succeeded by: Position abolished (Pattom Thanu Pillai as Prime Minister of Travancore)

Personal details
- Born: 1898 Mavelikkara, Travancore, British India
- Died: 5 April 1965 (aged 66–67) Mavelikkara, Kerala, India
- Spouse: Bhargavi Amma
- Education: Presidency College, Madras

P. G. N. Unnithan (1898 – 5 April 1965) was the last diwan of Travancore, serving from 1947 to 1948. He succeeded C. P. Ramaswami Iyer on 20 August 1947 following the latter's resignation (subsequent to the attempt on Iyer's life at the Swathi Thirunal Music Academy on 25 July 1947). He chaired the Travancore Constitutional Reforms Committee. He relinquished office on 24 March 1948 when people's government led by Pattom Thanu Pillai as prime minister took over.

== Early life ==
P. G. N Unnithan hailed from the Edassery Pattaveettil family of Mavelikkara which had a history of high military service to the Travancore royal family. His father, Ittamar Koil Thampuran, was from the Haripad Palace and nephew of Kerala Varma Valiya Koil Thampuran. He married Bhargavi Amma, the daughter of P. G. Govinda Pillai (government advocate at Alappuzha) of the Pullampilla Pichanattu (Viruthiyathu) family of Chengannur, who was among the earliest women of the region to support the national movement starting with the boycott of foreign clothes at Alleppey organised and led by the veteran freedom fighter and P. G. N. Unnithan's classmate K. Kumar of Travancore. His sister was married to the son of famed artist Raja Ravi Varma of the royal family of Mavelikkara. He had four children. He died on 5 April 1965.

== Legacy ==
Unnithan Lane at Sasthamangalam in Thiruvananthapuram is named after him.
