= Rowlatt Committee =

1917 inquiry in British India

The Sedition Committee, usually known as the Rowlatt Committee, was a committee of inquiry appointed in 1917 by the British Indian Government with Sidney Rowlatt, an Anglo-Egyptian judge, as its president, charged with evaluating the threat posed to British rule by the revolutionary movement and determining the legal changes necessary to deal with it.

== Background ==
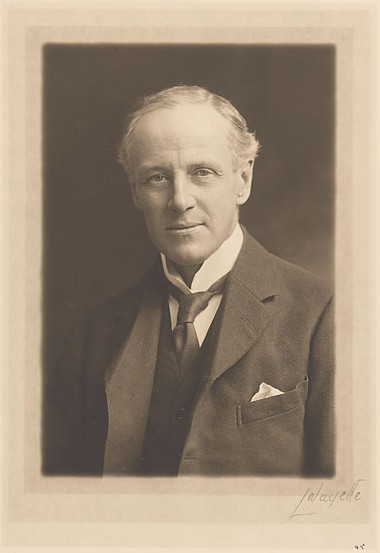
Sir Sidney Rowlatt, president and namesake of the committee.

The purpose of the Rowlatt Committee was to evaluate political terrorism in India, especially in the Bengal and Punjab Provinces, its impact, and the links with the German government and the Bolsheviks in Russia. It was instituted towards the end of World War I when the Indian revolutionary movement had been especially active and had achieved considerable success, potency and momentum and massive assistance had been received from Germany, which planned to destabilise British India. These included supporting and financing Indian seditionist organisations in Germany and in United States as well as a destabilisation in the political situation in neighbouring Afghanistan following a diplomatic mission that had attempted to rally the Amir of Afghanistan against British India. Attempts were also made by the Provisional Government of India established in Afghanistan following the mission to establish contacts with the Bolsheviks. A further reason for institution of the committee was emerging civil and labour unrest in India around the post-war recession - such as the Bombay mill worker's strikes and unrest in Punjab - and the 1918 flu pandemic that killed nearly 13 million people in the country.

The evidence produced before the committee substantiated the German link, although no conclusive evidence was found for a significant contribution or threat from the Bolsheviks. On the recommendations of the committee, the Rowlatt Act, an extension of the Defence of India Act 1915, was enforced in response to the threat in Punjab and Bengal.

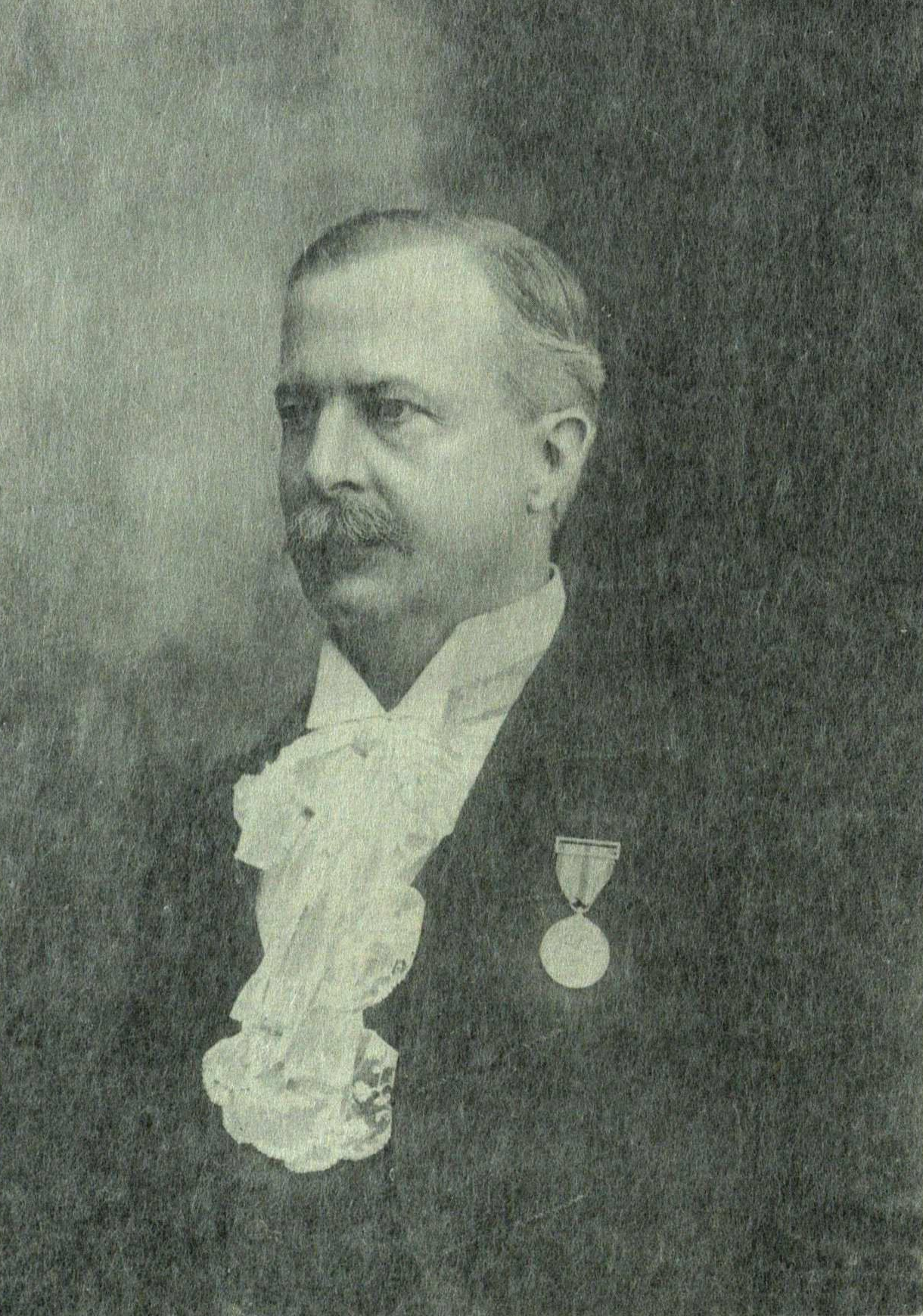
Sir Basil Scott, committee member

The agitation unleashed by the acts culminated on 13 April 1919, in the Jallianwala Bagh massacre in Amritsar, Punjab when the Brigadier-General Reginald Dyer, blocked the main entrance to the Jallianwallah Bagh, a walled-in courtyard in Amritsar, and ordered his British Indian Army soldiers to fire into an unarmed and unsuspecting crowd of some 6,000 people who had assembled there in defiance of a ban. A total of 1,650 rounds were fired, killing 379 people (as according to an official British commission; Indian estimates ranged as high as 1,500.)

== Committee members ==
- Sir Sidney Rowlatt - President
- Sir Basil Scott - Member (Chief Justice of the Bombay High Court)
- Sir C. V. Kumaraswami Sastri - Member (judge of Madras High Court)
- Verney Lovett - Member (member of Board of Revenue for United Provinces)
- Prabash Chandra Mitter - Member (member of Bengal Legislative Council)
- J. D. V. Hodge – Secretary (member of the Bengal Civil Service)

== See also ==
- Hindu–German Conspiracy
