= Apsarassu =

- Directed by: K. S. Gopalakrishnan
- Music by: S. P. Venkatesh
- Release date: 1990
- Country: India
- Language: Malayalam

Apsarassu is a 1990 Indian Malayalam film directed by K. S. Gopalakrishnan. The film has musical score by S. P. Venkatesh.

== Cast ==
- Ravi Menon
- Ramu
- Jagathy Sreekumar
- Kapil Dev
- Kapil Karzan
- Jaya Madhuri
- Prameela
- Vincent

== Soundtrack ==
The music was composed by S. P. Venkatesh and the lyrics were written by Bharanikkavu Sivakumar.

No.	Song	Singers	Lyrics	Length (m:ss)
1	"Maanodum Kaatil"	K. S. Chithra, Unni Menon	Bharanikkavu Sivakumar	
2	"Mizhikalil Daaham"	K. S. Chithra	Bharanikkavu Sivakumar	
3	"Shraavanaraavil"	K. S. Chithra	Bharanikkavu Sivakumar	
4	"Theyyaaram Theyyaaram"	P. Susheela, P. Jayachandran	Bharanikkavu Sivakumar	
