= V. N. Viswanatha Rao =

Indian civil servant and statesman

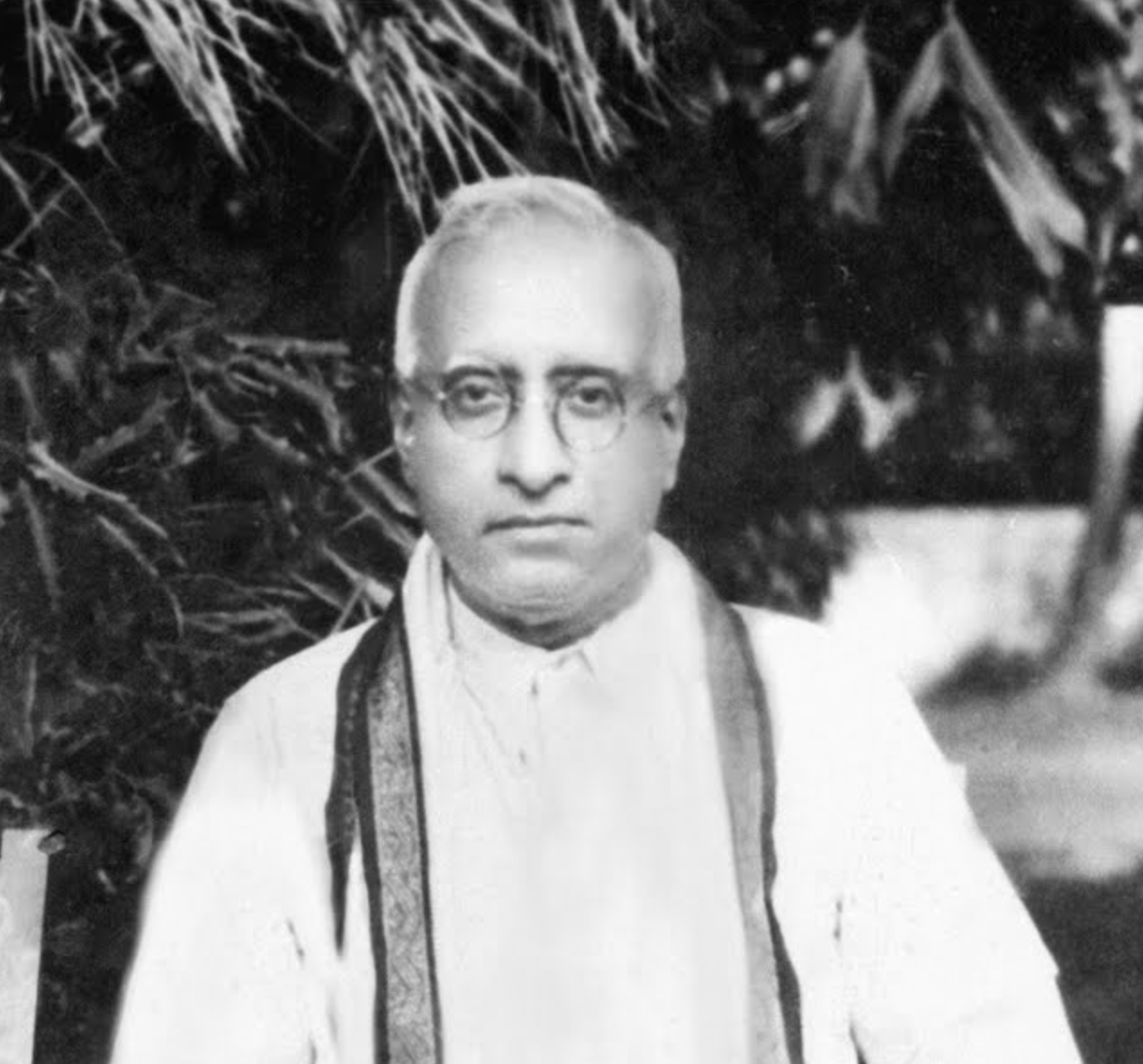
Diwan Bahadur Secretary VN Viswanatha Rao

Diwan Bahadur Raya Vallur Nott Viswanatha Rao CIE was an Indian civil servant and statesman who served as Finance Secretary, Law Secretary, and Education Secretary of the Madras Presidency, as well as in the Legislative Council of Madras, and as Collector of Tinnevelly, and of Tanjore.

His early days in civil service marked him as variously Statistical Assistant and then Personal Assistant to the Director of Agriculture, Madras Presidency.

He was son-in-law to Sir C. V. Kumaraswami Sastri, brother to Madras judge V. N. Ramanatha Rao, nephew to C. V. Viswanatha Sastri and C. P. Ramaswami Iyer, and father to jurist, tehsildar, and historian V. N. Srinivasa Rao.
