= T. Muthuswamy Iyer =

Indian judge (1832-1895)

Sir T. Muthuswamy Iyer
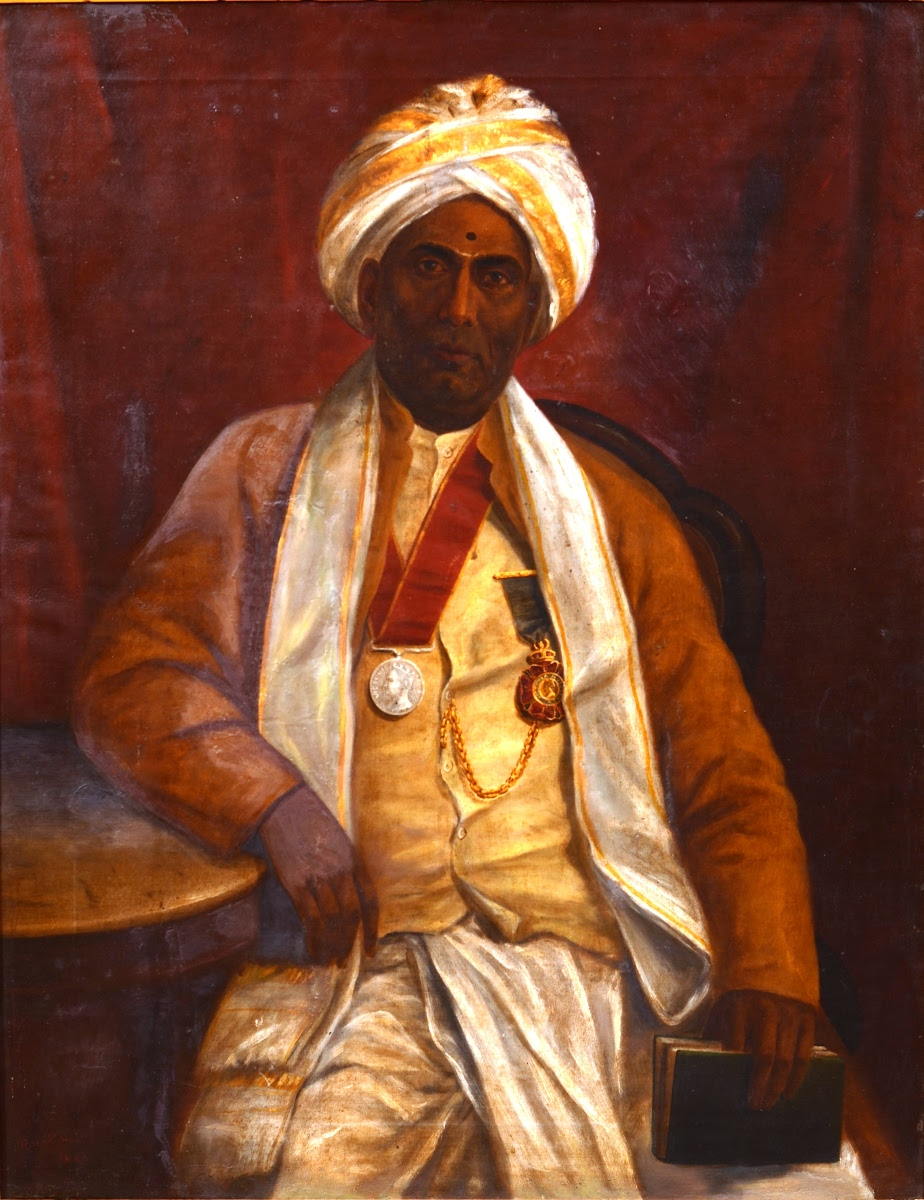
- Portrait of T. Muthuswamy Iyer by Raja Ravi Varma
- Born: 28 January 1832; Uchivadi, Vadapathimangalam, British India
- Died: 25 January 1895 (aged 62); Madras, British India
- Occupations: Lawyer, civil servant, administrator

Sir Thiruvarur Muthuswamy Iyer KCIE (28 January 1832 – 25 January 1895) was an Indian lawyer who, in 1877, became the first native Indian during the British Raj to be appointed as a judge of the High Court of Madras, and was briefly that court's acting Chief Justice in 1893.

On completion of his schooling, Muthuswamy served in subordinate posts in the civil service while continuing his education. Muthuswamy graduated in law from the Presidency College, Madras while serving as the magistrate of police and served as a judge in mofussil centres from 1871 to 1877, when he was appointed to the bench of the High Court of Madras. Muthuswamy served as a judge of the Madras High Court from 1877 till his death in 1895, acting as the Chief Justice for three months in 1893.

He advocated social reform and campaigned in support of women's education, widow remarriage and the legal recognition of sambandham, collaborating closely with C. V. Runganada Sastri and R. Raghunatha Rao. In 1893, Muthuswamy was made a Knight Commander of the Indian Empire in recognition of his services.

== Early life ==
Muthuswamy was born in a Brahmin family in Vuchuwadi, Madras Presidency, British Raj on 28 January 1832. Muthuswamy's father, Venkata Narayana Sastri, died when Muthuswamy was young and he moved with his mother to Thiruvarur to make a living. At Thiruvarur, Muthuswamy found employment as village accountant. However, his mother died soon afterward leaving Muthuswamy with little support. Around this time, Muthuswamy's talents were recognised by the tahsildar Muthuswamy Naicker who arranged for the former to study at Sir Henry Montgomery's school in Madras as a companion to his young nephew, and there he won prizes and scholarships year after year.

== Legal career ==
On successfully passing the Pleader's Test, Muthuswamy was appointed District Munsiff of Tranquebar. On 2 July 1859, Muthuswamy was appointed Deputy Collector of Tanjore. On 9 July 1865, Ier was appointed Sub-Judge of South Canara and served till July 1868, when he was appointed District Magistrate of police at Madras.

A portrait of Sir T. Muthuswamy Muthuswamy

While serving as the magistrate of police, Muthuswamy obtained his law degree law from the Presidency College, Madras. He also held a degree in Sanskrit at that time.

Muthuswamy commenced his legal career immediately after graduation. He was appointed a judge of the Court of Small Causes in 1871. He was made Fellow of Madras University the subsequent year. In 1877, the Madras Government took the controversial decision to appoint him as the first Indian judge of the High Court of Madras.

== Appointment to the bench of Madras High Court and controversy ==
In 1877, Muthuswamy was appointed to the bench of the High Court of Madras. He was the first Indian to be appointed to this post. However, Muthuswamy's appointment was condemned by a Madras newspaper called The Native Public Opinion. This prompted a strong reaction from Indian nationalists who founded The Hindu newspaper to voice public opinion against the outrage.

== Later career ==
Muthuswami served as a judge of the Madras High Court from 1877 to 1895. He acted for three months in 1893 as the Chief Justice of the Madras High Court, the first Indian to do so.

== Reforms ==
During his early career, Muthuswamy also served as the President of the Malabar Marriage Commission. During his tenure as President of the Commission, he campaigned for the legal recognition of Sambandham and other forms of marriage practised in the Malabar. In 1872, Muthuswamy established the Widow Remarriage Association in Madras and advocated remarriage of Brahmin widows.

In 1872, he was nominated fellow of the Madras University. He became a syndic in 1877. He was also invited to attend the Coronation Durbar at Delhi in 1877.

== Honours ==
In 1878, Muthuswami Iyer was created a Companion of the Most Eminent Order of the Indian Empire. In 1893, he was knighted for his services to the Crown.

== Death ==
Muthuswami died in January 1895 after an illness of ten days. On his death, Sir S. Subramania Iyer took the seat in the bench of the Madras High Court left vacant by his death.
