= Louis H. Ahrens =

South African academic and geochemist

Louis Ahrens FRSSAf
- Born: Louis Herman Ahrens; April 24, 1918; Pietermaritzburg, Natal, South Africa
- Died: September 5, 1990 (aged 72); Cape Town, South Africa
- Education: University of Pretoria (Ph.D.)
- Occupation: Geochemist
- Years active: 1941–1983
- Spouse: Evelyn Millicent McCulloch
- Father: F.W. Ahrens

Louis Herman Ahrens (24 April 1918 – 5 September 1990) was a South African born geochemist, academic, and author. Best known for his work in the 1950s in establishing a method of using rubidium–strontium dating as a means of geochronology.

== Early life ==
Louis Ahrens was born in Pietermaritzburg, South Africa in April 1918 and a descendant of Lutheran missionaries to the country. He was the son of F.W. Ahrens, a district magistrate and would travel with his father in South Africa and South-West Africa. Barely obtaining a matric, he attended the University of Natal and graduated with a Bachelor of Science degree in geology and chemistry in 1939. He would start his career in Johannesburg in 1940 at the National Institute of Metallurgy (then Government Metallurgical Laboratory) as an analytical chemist with emphasis on optical spectrochemical analysis. During this time he worked on his doctorate thesis in chemistry spectrochemical analysis which was granted in 1944 from the University of Pretoria. In 1945 he became a senior chemist at the Government Metallurgical Laboratory.

== Academic career ==
In 1946, he was awarded a post doctoral research fellowship from the Council for Scientific and Industrial Research (CSIR) and travelled overseas first visiting Cambridge, Oxford and Durham universities laboratories and then on to conduct research at Massachusetts Institute of Technology's Cabot Spectagraphic Laboratory. In 1949, he published a paper in the Bulletin of the Geological Society of America the establish the method of using Rubidium–strontium dating as a viable means of geochronology. In 1950, after his fellowship expired, he obtained the post of Associate Professor of Geochemistry. In 1951, Ahrens published a paper on the behaviour of silicate powders in d.c arcs.

He moved to Oxford University, England in 1954 obtaining the position as a reader in mineralogy and assisted Lawrence Wager to improve the university's geochemical and geochronological research. There he developed a new table of ionic radii.

In 1956, Ahrens returned to South Africa taking up the chair in chemistry at the University of Cape Town and developed the department of geochemistry as a separate department from geology by 1961 and became its professor of geochemistry. He retired from the university in 1978 due to ill health but continued in a role as special senior research fellow until 1983. He was a visiting professor of Geochemistry from 1962 to 1963 at MIT and a guest professor at the University of Göttingen in 1961. He would publish four books and wrote and co-authored over two hundred research papers.

During the Apollo program, Ahrens and his research team at the University of Cape Town received Moon rock samples for geochemical analyses. This was out of recognition of his work done on analyzing meteorites in the 1950s.

== Marriage ==
Ahrens married Evelyn Millicent McCulloch in 1941. They had three children, Yolanda, Wendy and Ian.

== Death ==
Ahrens died in Cape Town, South Africa in September 1990.

== Honours ==
- Captain Scott Memorial Medal - best honours student, Geological Society of South Africa (c.1939)
- Jubilee Gold Medal - strontium method of age determination, Geological Society of South Africa (1948)
- Fellow Royal Institute of Chemistry (1948)
- Fellow American Association for the Advancement of Science (1950)
- Third Mineralogical Society of America Award – for contribution to measurements of geological time, Mineralogical Society of America (1953)
- South African Medal – South African Association for the Advancement of Science (1971)
- Second President of the International Association of Geochemistry and Cosmochemistry (1972–1975)
- Merit certificate – research on moon rock samples, NASA (1980)
