= Panapakkam Anandacharlu =

Indian advocate and freedom fighter

Panapakkam Ananda Charlu
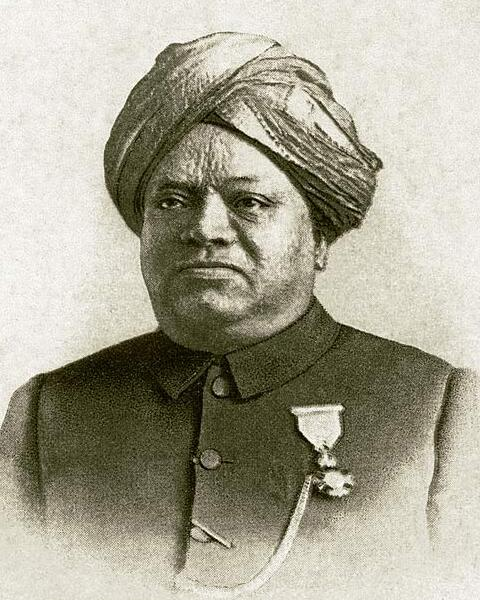

President of the Indian National Congress
- In office 1891–1892
- Preceded by: Pherozeshah Mehta
- Succeeded by: Womesh Chunder Bonnerjee

Personal details
- Born: 5 August 1843 Kattamanchi, Chittoor, Madras Presidency, British India
- Died: 4 January 1908 (aged 64)
- Party: Indian National Congress
- Spouse: Kanakavalli
- Relations: C. V. Runganada Sastri (father) C. V. Sundara Sastri (brother)

Rai Bahadur Sir Panapakkam Anandacharlu CIE (5 August 1843 – 4 January 1908) was an Indian lawyer and freedom fighter in British India who was a founding delegate and later president of the Indian National Congress, founder and president of the Triplicane Literary Society, and founder of the Madras Mahajana Sabha. He additionally aided the Triplicane Six in founding The Hindu, to which he was a frequent contributor.

== Early life ==
Anandacharlu was born in the village of Kattamanchi in Chittoor district, Madras Presidency in a Brahmin family, and at a young age was adopted by C. V. Runganada Sastri who brought him to Madras city. He later became an apprentice to a leading Madras advocate called Kayali Venkatapathi. His practice as a full lawyer began in 1869 when he became a member of the Chamber of the Madras High Court.

== Legal career ==
Anandacharlu became a member of the Chamber of the High Court of Madras in the year 1869. Soon he emerged as a prominent advocate and was appointed Leader of the Bar. It was in his Chambers that the Madras Advocates' Association was born in 1899. He practiced in partnership with his adoptive brother, C. V. Sundara Sastri.

== Political career ==
From the very beginning, Anandacharlu was interested in politics and journalism. He contributed regularly to magazines such as Native Public Opinion and the Madrasi. In 1878, he helped G. Subrahmania Iyer and M. Veeraraghavachariar in starting The Hindu and became a frequent contributor to it.

He founded the Triplicane Literary Society (of which he was elected president) and the Madras Mahajana Sabha in 1884. He was one of the 72 delegates at the first session of the Indian National Congress held at Bombay in 1885. He also participated in the Nagpur session of the Indian National Congress in 1891 of which he was elected president. When the Congress split in 1906, he was on the side of the moderates. However, he died soon after the split.
