= Sidney Rowlatt =

British barrister and judge

The Right Honourable Sir Sidney Rowlatt KCSI
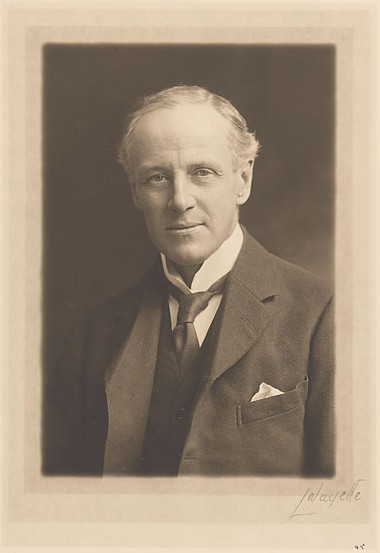
- Born: Sidney Arthur Taylor Rowlatt; 20 July 1862; Cairo, Egypt
- Died: 1 March 1945 (aged 82)
- Education: Fettes College, Edinburgh
- Alma mater: King's College, Cambridge
- Occupations: Barrister, judge
- Years active: 1886-1932
- Board member of: Rowlatt Committee
- Spouse: Elizabeth Hemmingway (m. 1890)
- Children: 6, including John
- Relatives: Justin Rowlatt (great-grandson)

Sir Sidney Arthur Taylor Rowlatt, KCSI, PC (20 July 1862 – 1 March 1945) was a British barrister and judge, remembered in part for his presidency of the sedition committee that bore his name, created in 1918 by the imperial government to subjugate and control the independence movement in British India, especially Bengal and the Punjab. The committee gave rise to the Rowlatt Act, an extension of the Defence of India Act 1915.

== Early life ==
Sidney Rowlatt was born in 1862 in Cairo and brought up in Alexandria, one of the most important ports of the Mediterranean. His father was Arthur Rowlatt, sent out by the Bank of England to take a post at the Banque Misr, and his second wife Amelia, the Alexandria-born daughter of Sidney Terry, merchant. His parents married on 9 May 1860 at the Anglican church in Alexandria. Her English grandparents, John and Sarah Friend, had moved to Egypt in 1825, and the family maintained working ties there for well over a century.

Sidney Rowlatt was the eldest son and had several siblings, two of whom stayed in Egypt. Sir Frederick Rowlatt became Governor of the National Bank and Charles Rowlatt became Director of Customs Administration. Fred's daughter Mary wrote a memoir of the five generations, A Family in Egypt, which was published in 1956, a few years after the revolution which marked the end of British rule in the country.

Sidney Terry appears to have been the grandfather of Sidney Sonnino, making Sidney Rowlatt a cousin of Italy's nineteenth prime minister.

The Rowlatt children grew up in Alexandria, living above the Bank building most of the year, and decamping to the nearby beach of Ramleh during the hottest months, as his mother's family had done for generations. In 1868 the Rowlatts built a house there, one of the first buildings in the resort, on a road later renamed after Arthur Rowlatt. They also owned a Nile boat named the Ablah, normally moored in Cairo.

Sidney Rowlatt and his brothers were sent to Britain to preparatory and private schools. He attended Fettes College in Edinburgh and then King's College, Cambridge, where he was a distinguished classics scholar. His younger brother John Friend Rowlatt followed him to Cambridge and acted as the non-rowing president at The Boat Race 1892.

After graduation, Sidney Rowlatt became a fellow of his college and taught classics for a while at Eton, where he was popular with his students.

== Career ==
Rowlatt decided to take up the law and was called to the Bar by the Inner Temple in 1886. He joined the Oxford circuit but made slow progress, devilling for Robert Finlay. When William Danckwerts took silk in 1900, the post of junior counsel to the Inland Revenue fell vacant and Finlay recommended Rowlatt. Then, in 1905 Finlay, now Attorney-General, gave him the post of Treasury devil, a role in which Rowlatt excelled with his energy and affability. He became a bencher of the Inner Temple in 1906 and later its Treasurer.

He represented the Board of Trade during the British inquiry into the Titanic disaster.

Rowlatt was appointed Recorder of Windsor and, in 1912, a judge of the King's Bench Division of the High Court, where among other matters he heard cases in the Revenue List.

In 1918 he chaired the inquiry into alleged "Criminal conspiracies connected with revolutionary movements in India", the Rowlatt Committee. The inquiry led to the controversial “Rowlatt Act” in 1919. This unpopular legislation provided for stricter control of the freedom of press, arrests without warrant, indefinite detention without trial, and juryless in camera trials for proscribed political acts. The accused were denied the right to know the accusers and the evidence used in the trial. Indian nationalists called for protest against the Act, which led to an unprecedented response of unrest and protests. In the Punjab, this led to the Jallianwala Bagh massacre, also known as the Amritsar Massacre. Accepting the report of the Repressive Laws Committee, the imperial government repealed this act in March 1922.

Rowlatt was known for the many tax cases he heard, particularly between 1923 and 1932, giving clear, concise and authoritative judgements, many of which are still cited today.

As a judge of the King's Bench Division, Rowlatt also heard murder trials, including that of George Stagg, who was found guilty of the murder of Aston Villa F.C. footballer Tommy Ball in November 1923.

Rowlatt retired in 1932 and was sworn of the Privy Council, under an arrangement brokered with Sir Claud Schuster whereby Rowlatt delayed his retirement for a year in exchange for a privy councillorship. As a result, he often in the Judicial Committee of the Privy Council, where his vote was crucial in the Labour Conventions Reference, which ended the Canadian "New Deal". The Canadian backlash was such that it indirectly led to the end of Privy Council appeals from Canada. Rowlatt's decisions in Australian cases were also badly received in that country.

He chaired the Royal Commission on Betting (1932–33) and during World War II sat as chairman of the General Claims Tribunal.

== Personal life ==
Rowlatt married Elizabeth Hemmingway in 1890 and the couple had four sons and two daughters. His son John Rowlatt was also a lawyer, who specialised in drafting tax legislation.

Media correspondent Justin Rowlatt is Sidney's great-grandson; in February 2015, Justin became the BBC's South Asia correspondent, posted in New Delhi, and in an article in August 2017 analysed his great-grandfather's drafting of the Rowlatt Act and the events it generated in the context of post-1947 India-UK relations.

== In popular culture ==
In the 1981 Granada Television series Lady Killers, Rowlatt was played by Richard Mathews in an episode entitled "A Boy's Best Friend", which depicted the trial of Sidney Harry Fox.

== Honours ==
- Knight Commander of the Order of the Star of India (1918).
