= Prevention of Seditious Meetings Act, 1907 =

Imperial Legislative Council
- Enacted by: Imperial Legislative Council

Repealed by
- Prevention of Seditious Meetings Act, 1911
- Status: Repealed

The Prevention of Seditious Meetings Act, 1907 (long title: An Act to make better provision for the prevention of public meetings likely to promote sedition or to cause a disturbance of public tranquillity) was a 1907 act of the Imperial Legislative Council of the British Raj enabling the government to prohibit political meetings.

The "area of operation" of the act was any Province of British India specified by order-in-Council of the Governor-General noted in the Gazette of India. The government of a province within the "area of operation" could then designate part or all of the province a "proclaimed area", noted in the provincial gazette. Each such notice would be valid for six months, but could be extended by the provincial government. In a proclaimed area, there were restrictions on public meetings with discussion, or distribution of written material, of "any subject likely to cause disturbance or public excitement or ... any political subject". Meetings over 20 or more people were presumed to be public. Such meetings were prohibited unless the police commissioner or district superintendent either gave written permission or received three days' advance notice in writing. The police could attend such a meeting, and the district magistrate or police commissioner could prohibit meetings "promoting disaffection or sedition". Organising or speaking at a prohibited meeting was punishable by six months' imprisonment and/or a fine.

The act was raised in the British House of Commons in February 1908 by Vickerman Rutherford, who questioned its effects on "the interests of good relations between the rulers and the ruled." Donald Mackenzie Smeaton defended the Act, noting that "the Regulation of 1818 and Subsidiary Local Regulations conferring similar powers were of immense value in and after the pacification of Burma in ridding the country not only of the enemies of the Government, but of the enemies of the people. . . ."

The act was extended until 31 March 1911, when the Prevention of Seditious Meetings Act, 1911 was passed to replace it.
