= Jawaharlal Nehru Fellowship =

Fellowship conferred by the Jawaharlal Nehru Memorial Fund

The Jawaharlal Nehru Trust Scholarship U.K. was founded by Admiral Lord Mountbatten of Burma in 1966 as a tribute to the India's first Prime Minister – Jawaharlal Nehru – after his death in 1964.

The scholarship was funded by the Nehru Memorial Trust in London, U.K. and was mostly for one year period for studies in the U.K.

In 1970, the Scholarship was awarded to Dr. Vinod Kumar Chopra (Ph.D. from Indian Institute of Technology, Kanpur) for Low Temperature Physics works with Dr. Kurt Mendelssohn, at the Clarendon Laboratory of Oxford University.

The tenure of his scholarship was extended to 3-years from September 1970 to October 1973.

The Chairperson of the Scholarship from India was then-Prime Minister Mrs Indira Gandhi, who personally interviewed the candidate after selection by the Education Ministry appointed Experts Committee headed by the UK Dy. High Commissioner.

The Scholarship was most prestigious and the scholars were honored by presenting them to the Queen at the Garden Party at the Buckingham Palace. They were invited to the annual Nehru Memorial Lectures as well.

The Trust Governors in the U.K were very high level dignitaries, such as Vice Admiral Sir Ronald Brockman, Lord Butler, Sir Graham Clifford and a few others. The Trust was very liberal in supporting the scholars' attending various international conferences.

The Jawaharlal Nehru Fellowship is a fellowship conferred by the Jawaharlal Nehru Memorial Fund, at the Nehru Memorial Museum & Library, New Delhi to Indian citizens carrying out scholarly research in India.

The fellowship is not confined to any particular stream of studies and is awarded for research in the field of the natural sciences as well as in the humanities.

The fellowship is tenable for two years and carries a monthly stipend of Rs.1,00,000/-, which is exempted from the recipient's income tax, as per India's Income Tax Act, 1961 u/s 10(17A). Other additional financial requirements are met, to a ceiling of Rs.75,000/- per month.

== History ==
The Jawaharlal Nehru Fellowship was founded in 1968 by the Jawaharlal Nehru Memorial Fund (JNMF). Pandit Jawaharlal Nehru, the Republic of India's first Prime Minister, had a great passion for expanding the frontiers of knowledge and scholarship in India, particularly through the agency of an Indian people newly-free, independent, and self-defining .

== Selection for the fellowship ==
The Jawaharlal Nehru Fellows are chosen by a selection committee consisting of persons in different fields.

== See also ==
- Jawaharlal Nehru Fellows
