= C. V. Sundara Sastri =

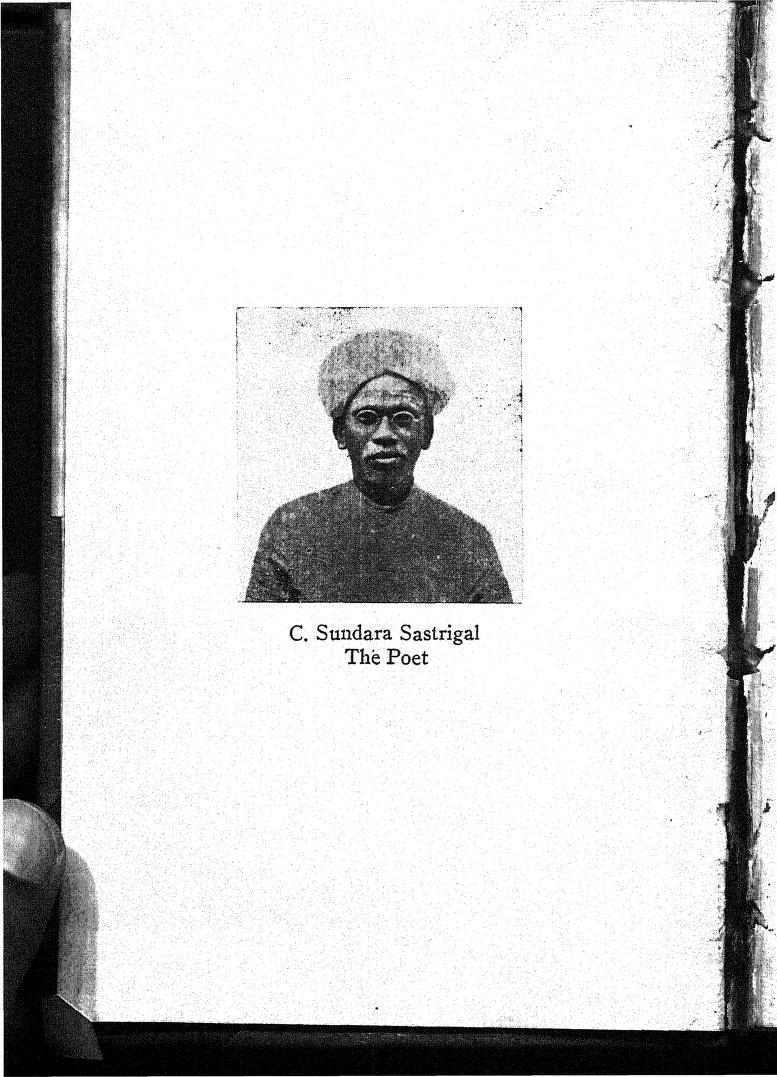
C. V. Sundararama Sastri

Calamur Viravalli Sundara Sastri (also spelt Sundram or Sundaram, and Sastry, Sastriar, Sastriyar, or Sastrigal) was a leading Vakil of the High Court of Madras, second in the Calamur line to bear the style Viravalli, and of a family line occupying a prominent position within the Madras Presidency; a "giant" of Madras jurisprudence, with a "very large" practice on the Original Side, which he shared with his partner and adoptive brother, Sir P. Ananda Charlu. Sundara Sastri published a Revised Set of the Rules of Practice for Original side litigation, which became de rigueur, and was noted as an orator with 'perfect' diction. He authored the Sundararāmāyaṇa.

Alongside K. P. Viswanatha Iyer, Sir C. Sankaran Nair, P.V. Krishnaswami Chetty, Sir V. Bhashyam Iyengar, and Sir P Ananda Charlu, he was one of only six Vakils to occupy two sets of chambers simultaneously.
