= C. P. Ramaswami Iyer =

Indian lawyer and politician (1879–1966)

Sir C. P. Ramaswami Iyer KCSI KCIE
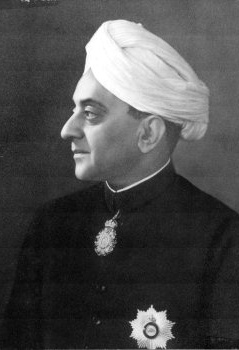
- Portrait of Ramaswami Iyer, The Hindu (1939)

8th Vice-Chancellor of Banaras Hindu University
- In office 1 July 1954 – 2 July 1956
- Appointed by: Rajendra Prasad
- Preceded by: Acharya Narendra Dev
- Succeeded by: Veni Shankar Jha

Diwan of Travancore
- In office 8 October 1936 – 19 August 1947
- Monarch: Sri Chithira Thirunal of Travancore
- Preceded by: Muhammad Habibullah
- Succeeded by: P. G. N. Unnithan

Member of the Executive Council of the Viceroy of India
- In office 1931–1936
- Monarchs: George V of the United Kingdom, Edward VIII of the United Kingdom
- Governor-General: Freeman Freeman-Thomas, 1st Marquess of Willingdon

Law Member of the Executive Council of the Governor of Madras
- In office 1923 – 10 March 1928
- Premier: Raja of Panagal, P. Subbarayan
- Governor: Freeman Freeman-Thomas, 1st Marquess of Willingdon, Sir Charles George Todhunter (acting), George Goschen, 2nd Viscount Goschen
- Preceded by: K. Srinivasa Iyengar
- Succeeded by: T. R. Venkatarama Sastri

Advocate-General of Madras Presidency
- In office 1920–1923
- Governor: Freeman Freeman-Thomas, 1st Marquess of Willingdon
- Preceded by: S. Srinivasa Iyengar
- Succeeded by: C. Madhavan Nair

Personal details
- Born: 13 November 1879 Wandiwash, North Arcot District, Madras Presidency, British India (now Vandavasi, Tiruvannamalai district, Tamil Nadu, India)
- Died: 26 September 1966 (aged 86) London, England, UK
- Party: Indian National Congress
- Spouse: Seethamma
- Children: C. R. Pattabhiraman; C. R. Venkata Subban; C. R. Sundaram
- Education: Presidency College, Madras
- Occupation: Lawyer
- Profession: Attorney-General, Statesman

Dewan Bahadur Sir Chetput Pattabhiraman Ramaswami Iyer KCSI KCIE (12 November 1879 – 26 September 1966), popularly known as Sir C. P., was an Indian lawyer, administrator and politician who served as the Advocate-General of Madras Presidency from 1920 to 1923, Law member of the Executive council of the Governor of Madras from 1923 to 1928, Law member of the Executive Council of the Viceroy of India from 1931 to 1936 and the Diwan of Travancore from 1936 to 1947. Ramaswami Iyer was born in 1879 in Madras city and studied at Wesley College High School and Presidency College, Madras before qualifying as a lawyer from the Madras Law College. He practised as a lawyer in Madras and succeeded S. Srinivasa Iyengar as the Advocate-General of the Madras Presidency. He subsequently served as the Law member of the Governor of Madras and of the Viceroy of India before being appointed Diwan of Travancore in 1936.

Ramaswami Iyer served as Diwan from 1936 to 1947; during his tenure, many social and administrative reforms were made. However, at the same time, he is also remembered for the ruthless suppression of the communist-organized Punnapra-Vayalar revolt, and his controversial stand in favor of an independent Travancore. He resigned in 1947 following a failed assassination attempt. He served as a leader of the Indian National Congress in his early days. He was made a Knight Commander of the Indian Empire in 1925 and a Knight Commander of the Star of India in 1941. He returned these titles when India attained independence in 1947. He was also a member of the 1926 and 1927 delegations to the League of Nations. In his later life he served in numerous international organisations and on the board of several Indian universities. Ramaswami Iyer died in 1966 at the age of 86 while on a visit to the United Kingdom.

== Ancestry and origins ==
C. P. Ramaswami Iyer belonged to a Tamil Brahmin Iyer family whose ancestral place was the town of Chetput in the North Arcot of Tamil Nadu.

Ramaswami Iyer's family originated from the group which inherited the village of Chetput.

Iyer was also related to Achan Dikshitar, brother of the famous Advaitist savant Appayya Dikshitar. Iyer's grandfather, Chetput Ramaswami Iyer served the British East India Company as Tehsildar of Kumbakonam. His family was deeply attached to the Sringeri mutt.

== Early life and education ==
Ramaswami Iyer was born in a Tamil-speaking Iyer Brahmin family on Deepavali day (13 November) 1879, to C. R. Pattabhirama Iyer(1857–1902), a prominent judge, and his wife, Seethalakshmi Ammal (also called Rangammal) in the town of Wandiwash, North Arcot. Ramaswami had his schooling at the Wesley College High School in Madras. He had an extremely strict upbringing as a result of a prediction that the child would not pass a single exam in his life. On completion of his schooling, Ramaswami enrolled at the Presidency College, Madras.

In college, C. P. Ramaswami Iyer won prizes in English, Sanskrit and Mathematics and the Elphinstone Prize for his paper on the Nebular theory. Ramaswami passed his degree with a gold medal and graduated with distinction from the Madras Law College.

Ramaswami had always desired to become an English professor. However, his father, Pattabhirama Iyer wished that his son become a lawyer and accordingly, Ramaswami chose a career in law. He spent his college vacations in the Mysore kingdom with the Diwan, Sir K. Seshadri Iyer whom he reportedly always claimed as his inspiration.

== As a lawyer ==
In 1903, Iyer joined V. Krishnaswamy Iyer as an apprentice. Just before the death of Pattabhirama Iyer the same year, he arranged for Iyer's admission as a junior to Sir V. Bhashyam Aiyangar but the latter was not able to accommodate him.

As a result, Iyer practised on his own and was known as a lawyer, inheriting the case-books of his father-in-law, C.V. Sundara Sastri, and his brothers-in-law, Sir C.V. Kumaraswami Sastri, and C.V. Viswanatha Sastri, who were recently elevated to justices of the High Court. He fought and won over 300 cases, building a reputation for himself as India's foremost and highest-remunerated litigator. By 1910 he was acknowledged as the undisputed leader of the original bar at the Madras High Court, shortly after which he was selected as the President of the First All Indian Lawyers Conference held at Allahabad. Forty-two minutes, my Lord, he once announced to a judge who asked him how much time he would need to finish a case; the next several years saw him win in some of the highest-profile cases of the time, including the Ashe murder trial and the Besant Narayaniah case., as well as representing the Nizam of Hyderabad and Berar and the Maharaja of Jammu and Kashmir, earning a private fortune, and rising to become the most powerful man in the Madras presidency for decades., having cultured close, even inappropriate friendships with Lord and Lady Willingdon.

In 1920, then-Governor Lord Willingdon appointed him the youngest-ever Advocate-General of Madras, during which tenure his income rose to an unprecedented 4,000 rupees, and in which capacity he would serve as premier state prosecutor for four years, until his subsequent promotion to the Governor's Executive Law Council, and, subsequently, the Viceregal Imperial War Council.

Sir C. P.'s stint on the Executive Law Council was marked by an intense commitment to industrialization and lowering the levelized post of power, with Iyer championing initiatives ranging from the introduction of hydroelectricity to the Mettur, Pykara and Bhavani projects and for the development of the Cochin, Tuticorin and Vishakhapatanam ports. His superintending the completion of the hydreoelectric project at the high-altitude Pykara in until three years to completion, at an expenditure of less than 6.75 crores was particularly heralded. The more-expensive Mettur initiative, inccuring capital outlays of 385 lakh rupees, nonetheless rendered over 328,396 acres in Tanjore District fully irrigated, with excess electric power being made available downstream.

In 1920, Iyer was elected to the Central Legislative Assembly from the Tanjore-Trichinopoly constituency in the vacancy caused by the resignation of A. Rangaswamy Iyenga. On 10 July 1930, which was the first meeting of the Assembly that Iyer attended, the House was debating the Simon Commission Report on a cut motion. In 1928, he was elected to the Legislative Assembly and later to the Council of Imperial State State; further immediate distinctions followed in the form of further appointments of honour during this period included as the Indian envoy to the first and second League of Nations, and to the Third Round Table Conference.

Formal decorations rapidly followed: Sir C. P. was appointed a Companion of the Order of the Indian Empire (CIE) in the 1923 New Year Honours, promoted to Knight Commander of that Order (KCIE) in the 1925 Birthday Honours, and a Knight Commander of the Star of India (KCSI) in the 1941 New Year Honours, continually buoyed by powerful support from the likes of the Willingdons and the Junior Maharani of Travancore. Sir C. P., at the request of his old friend the Junior Maharani of Travancore, also acceded to take on a further portfolio as the underage Maharaja's constitutional and legal adviser - a sum for which he was now earning 72,000 rupees a year.

== Indian Independence Movement ==
In his early days, Iyer was an admirer of Gopal Krishna Gokhale and desired to join the Servants of India society in Poona. In 1912, he fought on behalf of Jiddu Narayaniah against Annie Besant for the custody of his sons J. Krishnamurti and Nityananda in the famous Besant Narayaniah trial and won. Besant, however, later got the verdict annulled by appealing to the Privy Council in England. Iyer developed an admiration for Annie Besant and collaborated with her in organising the Home Rule League and served as its vice-president. In 1917, he became the Secretary of the Indian National Congress. He edited Besant's newspaper, New India, during her incarceration. at the same time, campaigning vigorously for her release. Iyer later distanced himself from the Indian Independence after disagreeing with Mahatma Gandhi over the Swadeshi and Non-Cooperation movements.

== As a member of the Executive Council of the Governor of Madras ==
In 1920, Iyer was nominated as the Advocate-General of Madras Presidency. He was responsible for the introduction of the City Municipalities Act and the Madras Local Boards Act. In 1923, he was nominated to the executive council of the Governor of Madras and was charged with the portfolios of law and order, police, Public Works Department, irrigation, ports and electricity.

As a member of the executive council, Iyer laid the foundation of the Pykara Dam which was constructed between 1929 and 1932 at a cost of Rs. 67.5 million. He also started the construction of Mettur Dam over the Cauvery river. While the Pykara Hydro-electric project triggered the rapid industrialization of Coimbatore, the Mettur project was used to irrigate vast areas of Tanjore and Trichy districts. As the member in charge of ports, Iyer was also responsible for the improvement of Cochin, Visakhapatnam and Tuticorin ports.

As law member, Iyer was instrumental in passing the Devadasi Abolition Bill proposed by Muthulakshmi Reddy. However, owing to strong protests from devadasis across Madras Presidency, Iyer suggested that the bill be introduced only as a private bill and not a government measure.

Between 1926 and 1927, he was the Indian Delegate at the League of Nations in Geneva. By 1931, he was a Law Member of the Government of India and, in 1932, attended the Third Round Table Conference at London.

In 1933, he was the sole Indian delegate to the World Economic Conference and the next year he drafted a constitution for the state of Kashmir.

== Diwan of Travancore ==
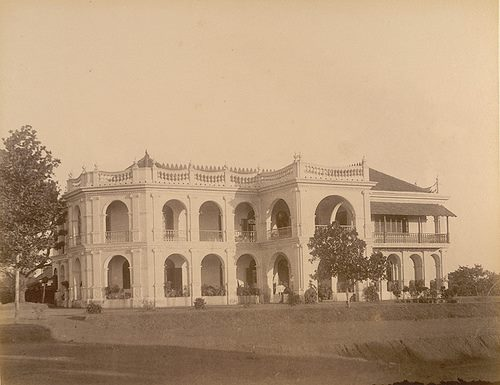
Bhakti Vilas - official palace Sir C. P. Ramaswamy Iyer as Diwan

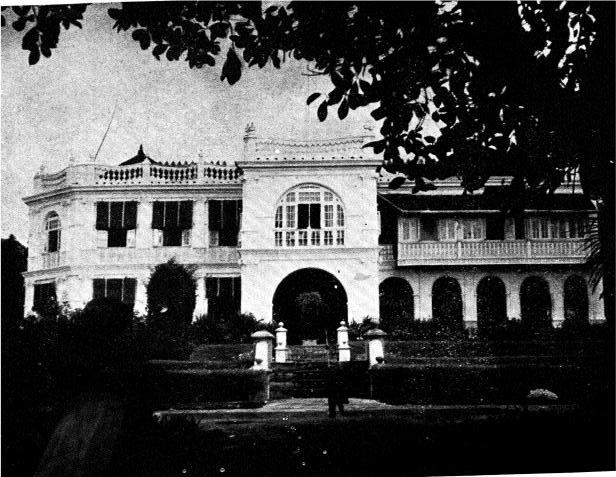
Secondary view

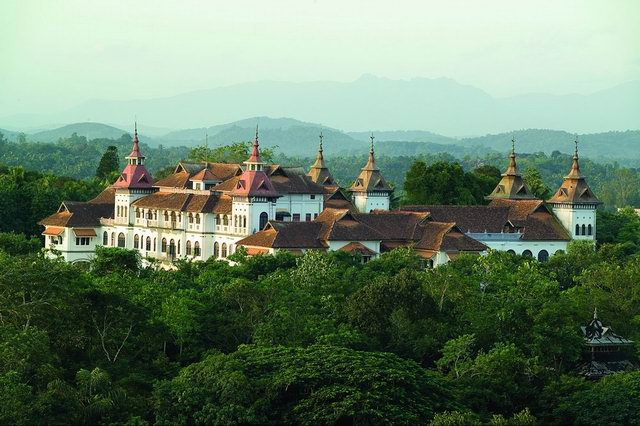
Kowdiar Palace - official residence of the Junior Maharani and her son, the underage monarch, as well as a frequent site for the Diwan to personally counsel the Maharani

In 1931, when Chithira Thirunal was barred from succeeding his deceased uncle as the Maharaja of Travancore, Iyer spoke on his behalf to the Viceroy of India. The Viceroy agreed to crown Chithira Thirunal but only on the condition that Iyer should function as adviser to the young monarch. Iyer agreed and served as Legal and Constitutional adviser and Regent to the prince from 1931 to 1936, drawing comensation of 72,000 rupees a year for his direct services. In 1936, Maharajah Chithira Thirunal personally requested Iyer to be the Diwan of Travancore. Iyer accepted the offer and served as Diwan for a period of ten years.

=== Temple Entry Proclamation ===
On 12 November 1936, Maharajah Chithira Thirunal issued the revolutionary Temple Entry Proclamation which gave Hindus of all castes and classes, including Dalits or untouchables, the right to enter Hindu temples in the state. This was bitterly opposed by conservative, yet influential upper-caste Hindus who posed a grave-threat to the life of the Diwan. This proclamation earned for the Maharajah and his Diwan the praise of Mahatma Gandhi and other reformers.

=== Economic and industrial reforms ===
Master Builder

"He was builder of dams, canals, hydroelectric works, fertilizer plants, member of Viceroy's executive council, vice-chancellor of three universities, delegate at third round table conference and much more"

— ~ Khushwant Singh, Master Builder, 17 July 1999

During Iyer's tenure as Diwan, Travancore made rapid strides in industrial development. The Indian Aluminium Company was invited to set up a factory in the town of Aluva. The first fertiliser plant in India, the Fertilizers and Chemicals of Travancore Ltd. (FACT) was established by Iyer to manufacture ammonium sulphate. This was established with American collaboration in open defiance to the hostility of the Viceroy of India. Iyer also established a plant to manufacture cement and another to manufacture titanium dioxide. The Travancore plywood factory at Punalur The Travancore Rayons Limited was established in 1946 with a plant at Perumbavoor. The first plant to manufacture aluminium cables was opened at Kundara.

By the time, Iyer stepped down as Diwan in 1947, the revenues of the state had increased fourfold from the time he had assumed charge.

=== Irrigation works ===
Iyer wished to establish a hydroelectric power project on the Periyar river. However, his efforts were opposed by the Government of Madras. Iyer argued as a lawyer on behalf of Travancore and won. As a result, the Pallivasal hydro-electric power project was established on the Periyar river. He initiated the Pechipara Hydro-electric Scheme (later, the Kodayar Hydroelectric Power Project in Kanyakumari District), the Periyar Game Sanctuary, and other irrigation projects.

=== Other reforms ===
Iyer carried out a great deal of pioneering work for the Vivekananda Rock at Cape Comorin and built guest-houses at Kanyakumari. He renovated the Padmanabhapuram Palace of Marthanda Varma's days (in present-day Kanyakumari District) and expanded the Trivandrum Art Gallery.

In 1937, Iyer started the University of Travancore with the Maharajah as Chancellor and himself as Vice Chancellor. In 1939, he was awarded an honorary L.L.D. Degree by the University of Travancore In 1940 under his Dewanship Travancore became the first state to nationalise road transport in India.

The first cement highway in India was constructed between the capital Trivandrum and Kanniyakumari covering a distance of 88 kilometres. The same year capital punishment was abolished and adult franchise introduced. He was also the first to appoint a lady as District Judge (Mrs. Anna Chandy later became the first Indian woman High Court Judge). Iyer introduced for the first time the midday meal scheme to prompt poor children to attend school.

Sir C. P. Ramaswami Iyer introduced India’s first large-scale free midday meal program for underprivileged children through the Vanchi Poor Fund in Travancore. His pioneering efforts greatly improved school attendance and inspired similar schemes across the country

In 1941, the British conferred on him the title of Knight Commander of the Star of India (KCSI). When Indian Independence came into view Travancore and other Princely States were given two options of either staying independent or merging with the dominions of India or Pakistan.

=== Punnapra-Vayalar revolt ===
A mass uprising broke out in the Alleppey region in October 1946. On 24 October Travancore police killed near about 200 people in Punnapra and the government ordered martial law in Alleppey and Cherthala. Sir C. P.'s police and army moved to Alleppey and on 27 October, Vayalar witnessed another mass uprising and 150 people were killed on the spot. On the same day, 130 people were killed in different locations of Alleppey in police shoot-outs. According to Prof. A Shreedhara Menon's Kerala History, about 1,000 people died in the Punnapra Vayalar Agitation. Even though the agitation was a short-lived failure, it resulted in better administration of Travancore.

=== Declaration of independence ===
When, on 3 June 1947, the United Kingdom accepted demands for a partition and announced its intention to quit India within a short period, the Maharaja of Travancore desired to declare himself independent. Supported by the Diwan, Iyer, Chithira Thirunal issued a declaration of independence on 18 June 1947. As Travancore's declaration of independence was unacceptable to India, negotiations were started with the Diwan by the Government of India. Family sources indicate that Iyer himself was not in favour of independence but only greater autonomy, and that a favourable agreement had been reached between Iyer and the Indian representatives by 23 July 1947 but accession to the Indian Union could not be carried out only because it was pending approval by the Raja.

On the other hand, noted historian Ramachandra Guha has written about how Iyer, egged on by Mohammed Ali Jinnah, had established secret ties with senior Ministers of the British Government, who encouraged him in the hope that he would give them privileged access to monazite, a material Travancore was rich in and which could give the British a lead in the nuclear arms race.

Nevertheless, an assassination attempt was made on Iyer on 25 July 1947 during a concert commemorating the anniversary of Swati Thirunal. Iyer survived with multiple stab wounds and hastened the accession of Travancore state to the Indian Union soon after his recovery.

== Later years ==
After he resigned his Dewanship of Travancore, Iyer left for London. In the same year, he visited Brazil on the invitation of the Government of Brazil and Argentina, Peru and Mexico as a tourist. He also visited the United States, where he gave talks at the University of California, Berkeley, and had discussions with important bank executives, journalists and US President Harry S. Truman.

In 1949–50, he visited the United States again as a visiting professor of the American Academy of Asian Studies at California. In 1952, he toured Australia and New Zealand as a guest of the respective governments and visited the United States again in 1953 on a lecture tour.

From 1 July 1954 to 2 July 1956, he served as the Vice Chancellor of Banaras Hindu University. From 26 January 1955, Iyer also served as a Vice Chancellor of Annamalai University, thereby becoming the first Indian to function as Vice Chancellor of two universities at the same time.

In 1953, Iyer was appointed member of the Press Commission of India. Two years later, Iyer toured China as the leader of an Indian universities delegation. Iyer served as a member of the University Grants Commission (1955), the Punjab Commission (1961), the National Integration Committee on Regionalism, the Chairman of the Hindu Religious Endowments Commission from 1960 to 1962, and President of the Inter-University board of India and Ceylon (1965).

== Death ==
In September 1966, Iyer left for England to conduct research on a planned book titled "A History of My Times" at the India Office library. At about 11:30 am, on 26 September 1966, he was in the National Liberal Club (where he had been a member for over 50 years), when he suddenly slumped on his armchair while speaking to a reporter and died instantly. The following day, The Times carried the news of his death:

Sir C.P. Ramaswami Aiyar, jurist, scholar, statesman and wit, who died suddenly in London yesterday, was one of the outstanding Indians of his day

Condolences were also offered by C. Rajagopalachari, Zakir Husain (then-President of India), The Hindu, The Times of India, Prime Minister of India Indira Gandhi, and K. Kamaraj.

== Legacy ==
Iyer was acknowledged for his talent as a lawyer, administrator and visionary. Edwin Samuel Montagu, who served as the Secretary of State for India from 1917 to 1922, described him as "one of the cleverest men in India". He is credited with having transformed Kanyakumari district into the rice-bowl of Travancore and is acclaimed for being the first person to envisage the industrialisation of Madras Presidency. He is also regarded as an egalitarian and the first caste Hindu lawyer to admit a Dalit, N. Sivaraj as his junior.

Under his leadership, Travancore became the first princely state to abolish capital punishment, first to introduce free and compulsory education and the first princely state to be connected to the rest of India by air. M. G. Ramachandran, former Chief Minister of Tamil Nadu recollected at Iyer's birth centenary celebrations in 1979 that Iyer was the first to introduce the midday meal scheme in the form of the Vanchi Poor Fund in Travancore. C. N. Annadurai remarked at a speech in 1967 that Iyer was the first person in India to suggest a plan for interlinking the nation's rivers.

However, his greatest achievement is believed to be the Temple Entry Proclamation which for the first time, permitted Dalits to enter Hindu temples which he introduced despite a severe threat to his life.

Iyer was known for his philanthropic activities and the institutions he helped establish. After his death, The C. P. Ramaswami Aiyar Foundation was established in his memory in order to promote traditional arts and crafts.

While serving as a law member of the executive council of the Governor of Madras, Ramaswami Iyer's agenda for social reform and opening the doors of Hindu temples for Dalits and low-caste Hindus were praised by C. Natesa Mudaliar, one of the founders of the South Indian Liberation Federation. Iyer was a patron of arts and music and was member of experts committee consisting of some of the leading musicians and scholars to advise the Madras Music Academy.

Iyer was a friend of the English writer Somerset Maugham who had a prolonged discussion with while on a visit to Trivandrum. Later, Maugham supplied a eulogy for the book, Iyer by his Contemporaries:

He had the geniality of the politician who for years has gone out of his way to be cordial with everyone he meets. He talked very good English, fluently, with a copious choice of words, and he put what he had to say plainly, and with logical sequence. He had a resonant voice and an easy manner. He did not agree with a good deal that I said and corrected me with decision, but with courtesy that took it for granted I was too intelligent to be affronted by contradiction

Indian civil servant C. S. Venkatachar wrote that the Kashmir issue might have been resolved in favour of India had Jawaharlal Nehru chosen Iyer instead of Gopalaswami Ayyangar to present India's case at the United Nations. The same view was also shared by Arcot Ramasamy Mudaliar. While chairing the Indian Committee on National Integration, Iyer introduced the clause making it mandatory that newly elected member of Parliament and state assemblies should take an allegiance to the Indian Union. It is believed that the introduction of this clause compelled the Dravida Munnetra Kazhagam to give up its goal of secession from the Indian Union.

Iyer was an active freemason and served as a member of the Carnatic Lodge.

== Criticism ==
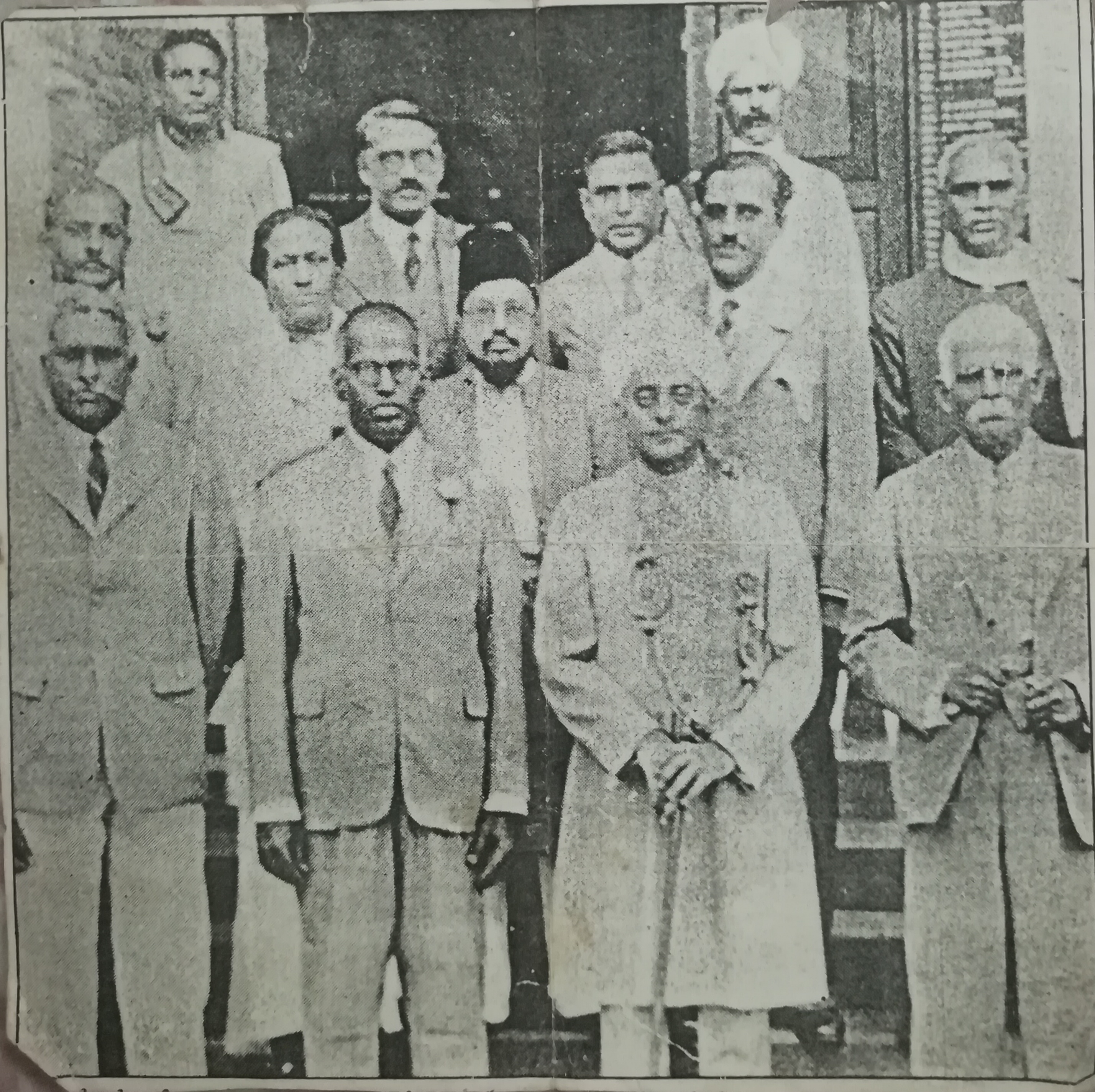
Sir Sir C. P. Ramaswami Iyer with Directors of Travancore National and quilon bank which includes Iyer Matthen (MD), K. C. Mammen Mappillai, M. O. Thomas Vakkel Modisseril(Director) and Barrister VT Thomas.

While being hailed as a modernising reformer by many, Iyer is also criticised as a capitalist, authoritarian, imperialist, anti-Syrian Christian (a nazarene ethnic group in Travancore) and anti-Communist by some. Iyer has been sharply criticized for failing to rescue the deteriorating Travancore National and Quilon Bank and for cracking down on the bank and its managing director, Iyer Mathen. It is believed that Iyer, allegedly an anti-Syrian Christian framed the downfall of Quilon Bank, using his influence. In 1946, Communist dissent over Iyer's policies erupted in the form of the Punnapra-Vayalar revolt which was crushed with a brutal hand by Travancore army and navy. Communist hatred over Iyer's policies finally culminated in an assassination attempt upon the Diwan. However, despite deep antagonism between Iyer and Communists, he opposed the dismissal of the Communist government of Kerala headed by E. M. S. Namboodiripad in 1959 by the Jawaharlal Nehru government as "unconstitutional". Iyer was also labelled as a "secessionist" due to his initial reluctance in merging Travancore with the Indian Union. Jawaharlal Nehru said of his attitude towards imperialism:

There is little now in common between us except our nationality. He is today a full-blooded apologist of British rule in India, especially during the last few years; an admirer of dictatorship in India and elsewhere, and himself a shining ornament of autocracy in an Indian state.

His attempt to negotiate a trade agreement with Pakistan on behalf of Travancore was viewed as a betrayal by most Indians.

== Family ==
In 1895, at the age of 16, Iyer was married to nine-year-old Seethamma (1886–1930), granddaughter of Indian polyglot and judge C. V. Runganada Sastri and sister to High Court justices Dewan Bahadur Sir C. V. Kumaraswami Sastri and Dewan Bahadur C.V. Viswanatha Sastri, as well as cousin to Shankaracharya Bharati Krishna Tirtha Maharaj, pontiff of the Dwaraka Math, and later supreme pontiff of Smarta Hinduism at the Govardhan Math, and to the Finance Secretary of the Madras Presidency and former Tehsildar Dewan Bahadur V.S. Viswanatha Rao. She died in March 1930 leaving behind three sons, C. R. Pattabhiraman, C. R. Venkata Subban and C. R. Sundaram. Pattabhiraman participated in the Indian Independence Movement and was active in the Indian National Congress even after Iyer's resignation from the party. He was elected to the Lok Sabha from Kumbakonam in 1957 and 1962 and served as Deputy Minister and later, Minister of Industries from 1966 to 1967, and then Minister for Law. Pattabhiraman was also one of the founders of the Madras Cricket Club along with P. Subbarayan. Iyer's nephew would later go on to marry the niece and heiress to V. K. Krishna Menon.

== In popular culture ==
- Somerset Maugham named a character in his 1932 novel The Narrow Corner "Ramaswami Iyer" after C. P. Ramaswami Iyer, who he had met on a visit to India.
- Vaikom Muhammad Basheer wrote a collection of essays titled Dharmarajyam against the policies of C. P. Ramaswami Iyer. The book was banned and it is said that Basheer himself got these essays printed and sold them at local shops and households, going on foot. Basheer was arrested and jailed for two years later.
- Veteran Tamil film actor Nassar played the role of C. P. Ramaswami Iyer in the 1998 Malayalam movie Rakthasakshikal Sindabad.

== Works ==
- C. P. Ramaswami Iyer (1966). Gokhale: the man and his mission: Gopal Krishna Gokhale birth centenary lectures. Servants of India Society.
- C. P. Ramaswami Iyer (1968). Biographical vistas: sketches of some eminent Indians. Asia Publishing House.

== Notes ==
Preceded by S. Srinivasa Iyengar	Advocate-General of Madras Presidency; 1920–1923	Succeeded by
Preceded by	Law Member of the Executive Council of the Governor of Madras; 1923–1928	Succeeded by
Preceded by	Law Member of the Executive Council of the Viceroy of India; 1931–1936	Succeeded by
Preceded by Muhammad Habibullah	Diwan of Travancore; 1936–1947	Succeeded by P.G.N. Unnithan
