= Aryama Sundaram =

Indian lawyer

C. Aryaman Sundaram is an Indian lawyer who practices in the Supreme Court of India.

He was the youngest lawyer in the history of the Madras High Court to be designated as a senior advocate.

He has represented the Board of Control for Cricket in India, Anil Ambani and several other high-profile clients at various judicial forums, including representing the Mistry family against Tata & Sons, the Travancore Devaswom Board in matters relating to the Sabarimala Temple and its admissions policy, Haldia Petrochemicals and Cyrus Mistry, BALCO, Khushwant Singh against pre-release banning and suppression of his book, Minister V. Senthil Balaji, and Nikhil Gupta as charged for the attempted assassination of Khalistani separatist Gurpatwant Singh Pannun.

He was a lawyer in the S. Rangarajan case which resulted in one of the landmark judgments on the freedom of speech and expression.
