= Gosahasra =

Ritual donation described in the ancient texts of India

Gosahasra or go-sahasra-dana (literally "the gift of a thousand cows") is a ritual donation described in the ancient texts of India. It is one of the sixteen great gifts (shodasha-mahadana), and is frequently mentioned in the ancient inscriptions.

== Scriptural authority ==
The Atharvaveda-parishishta, composed in the 1st millennium BCE, mentions gosahasra, along with hiranyagarbha and tulapurusha donations. These three donations are included among the sixteen great gifts in the later text Matsya Purana; the relevant section of the text appears to have been composed during 550-650 CE. The Matsya Purana states that several ancient kings performed the great gifts, and these three donations are most prominent among the great gifts recorded in historical inscriptions.

The Linga Purana also mentions the sixteen great gifts; according to R. C. Hazara, the relevant portion of the text was composed during c. 600-1000 CE, most probably after 800 CE. The great gifts are further detailed in the later digests devoted to the topic of charity (dāna), such as Ballala's Dana-sagara, and the Danakhanda section of Hemadri's Chaturvarga-chintamani (13th century).

== Historical performers ==
- The inscriptions of the Shalankayana and Vishnukundin kings (c. 4th-6th centuries) mention gosahasra and hiranyagarbha performances.
- Attivarman (c. 4th century) of Ananda dynasty of Guntur region performed gosahsra and hiranyagarbha. Damodaravarman of this dynasty also made these two donations.
- The Tugu inscription of Purnavarman (c. 5th century), a ruler of Tarumanagara in present-day Indonesia, records a gift of a thousand cows to brahmanas.
- The Siripuram inscription of the Vasishtha king Anantavarman (c. 5th century) records gosahasra and other donations by his grandfather Gunavarman.
- Jayantavarman alias Cendan (c. 7th century) of Pandya dynasty, according to one of his inscriptions, "castigated the Kali age" by performing gosahsra along with hiranyagarbha and tulapursuha.
- An inscription of the Pandya king Varaguna I (r. c. 768-811) states that his father and grandfather performed hiranyagarbha, tulabhara and gosahasra many times.
- The Pandya king Nedumaran, according to his Madurai inscription, performed many great gifts including those of gosahasra, tulabhara (tulapurusha), and hiranyagarbha.
- Chandradeva (c. 1099 CE) of Gahadavala dynasty performed gosahasra and tulapurusha donations in front of an idol of Adikeshava, and then granted some villages, according to his Chandravati inscription
- Anavema Reddi (14th century) of Reddi dynasty made the gosahasra donation.
- Krishnadevaraya (r. 1509-1529) of the Vijayanagara Empire performed the sixteen great gifts according to the 1510 Rameswaram inscription and the 1513 Srikalahasti inscription. His 1521 Chikalparvi inscription records the performance of gosahasra along with that of other great gifts of ratnadhenu, hiranashva, and tulapurusha.
- Venkata I (r. c. 1542) and Tirumala Deva Raya (r. c. 1565-1572) of Vijayanagara also performed all the great gifts including the gosahasra.
- Dodda Kempadevaraja (r. c. 1659-1673) of Mysore of performed the sixteen great gifts, including gosahsra.
