= Hiranyagarbha (donation) =

Ancient Indian ceremony involving the donation of a golden vessel

Hiranyagarbha (IAST: hiraṇya-garbha) is an ancient Indian ritual ceremony involving the donation of a golden vessel. It is mentioned as one of the "Sixteen great gifts" in the historical texts.

== Ritual ==
The word hiranyagarbha literally means "golden womb": it signifies a golden pot (kunda) donated to a Brahmana, and also refers to the god Vishnu.

The donor performs an archana (worship ritual), and utters a mantra praising the lord Hiranya garbha, that is, Vishnu. The performer then enters into the "golden womb", as the priests perform the rites usually performed for a pregnant woman: garbhadhana, pumsavana, and simantonnayana.

Next, the donor is taken out of the "golden womb", and the priests perform jatakarma and other rites usually performed for a newborn. The donor utters a mantra announcing a "rebirth" from the divine womb, and is called "born of the hiranya garbha".

After the ceremony, the donor gives away the "golden womb" and other gifts to the priests.

== History ==
The Atharvaveda-parishishta, composed in the 1st millennium BCE, describes hiranyagarbha, besides tulapurusha and gosahasra donations. These three donations are included among the sixteen great gifts in the later text Matsya Purana; the relevant section of the text appears to have been composed during 550-650 CE. It states that several ancient kings performed the great gifts. The Linga Purana also mentions the sixteen great donations; according to R. C. Hazara, the relevant portion of the text was composed during c. 600–1000 CE, most probably after 800 CE. The great gifts are also described in the later digests devoted to the topic of charity (dāna), such as Ballala's Dana-sagara, and the Danakhanda section of Hemadri's Chaturvarga-chintamani (13th century).

The Chalukya king Pulakeshin I (c. 540–567) is known to have performed the hiranyagarbha ritual (although not mentioned as a great gift) to proclaim his sovereignty. The 7th century Pandya king Jayantavarman (alias Cendan), according to one of his inscriptions, performed three of the great gifts: hiranyagarbha, gosahasra, and tulapursuha.

The great gifts went on to become the principal sign of a king's beneficence, overlordship, and independence in the subsequent centuries. In particular, hiranyagarbha finds a mention in multiple historical inscriptions of Indian kings, including:

- King Attivarman (c. 4th century) of Ananda dynasty, who is called hiranyagarbha-prasava ("born of the golden womb") in the Gorantala inscription.
- Damodaravarman of Ananda dynasty.
- Vishnukundin king Madhavarman I, who is called hiranyagarbha-prasuta ("born of the golden womb") in the Ipur and Polamuru inscriptions.
- Mangalesha (r. c. 592–610 CE), who is called hiranyagarbha-sambhuta ("produced from the golden womb") in the Mahakuta Pillar inscription
- Dantidurga (r. c. 735–756) of Rashtrakuta dynasty
- Rajaraja I (r. c. 985–1014) and his wife Dantisakti Vitanki a.k.a. Lokama-devi of the Chola Dynasty performed the sacrifice, this is mentioned in the inscription present in the Thiruvisanallur Sivayoginathar Temple.
- Jaya Pala (r. c. 1075–1110)
- The ruler of Travancore used the ritual to raise his caste status to that of a Kshatriya.
