= Prabhanjanavarman =

Prabhanjanavarman or Prabhanjana Varman may refer to any of the following Indian kings:

- Prabhanjanavarman (Mathara dynasty)
- Prabhanjanavarman (Vasishtha dynasty)
- Nandaprabhanjanavarman
