= Tulabhara =

Ancient Indian practice in which a person is weighed against a commodity such as gold

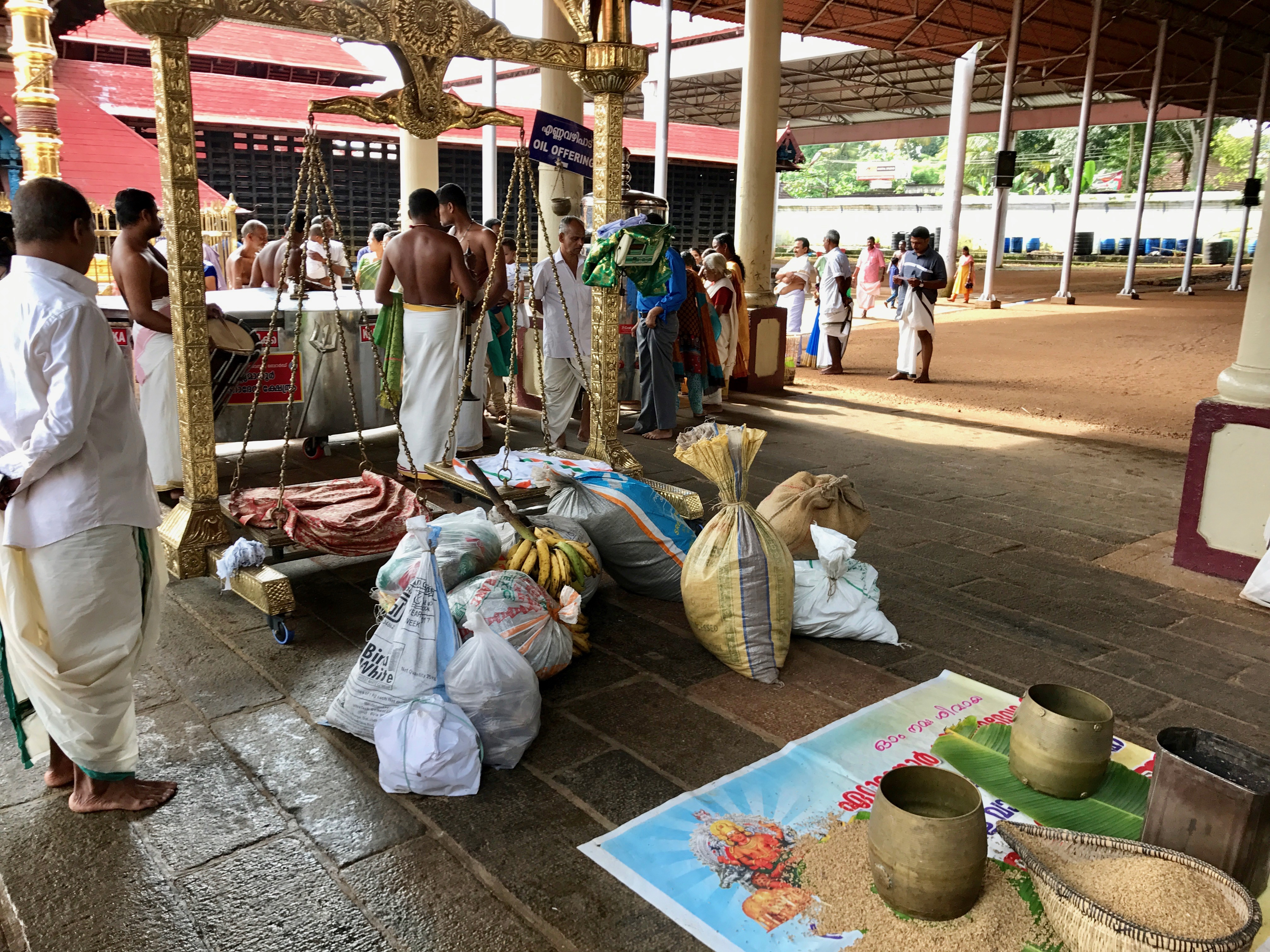
A tula-dana balance at the Ettumanoor Mahadevar Temple in Kerala, India

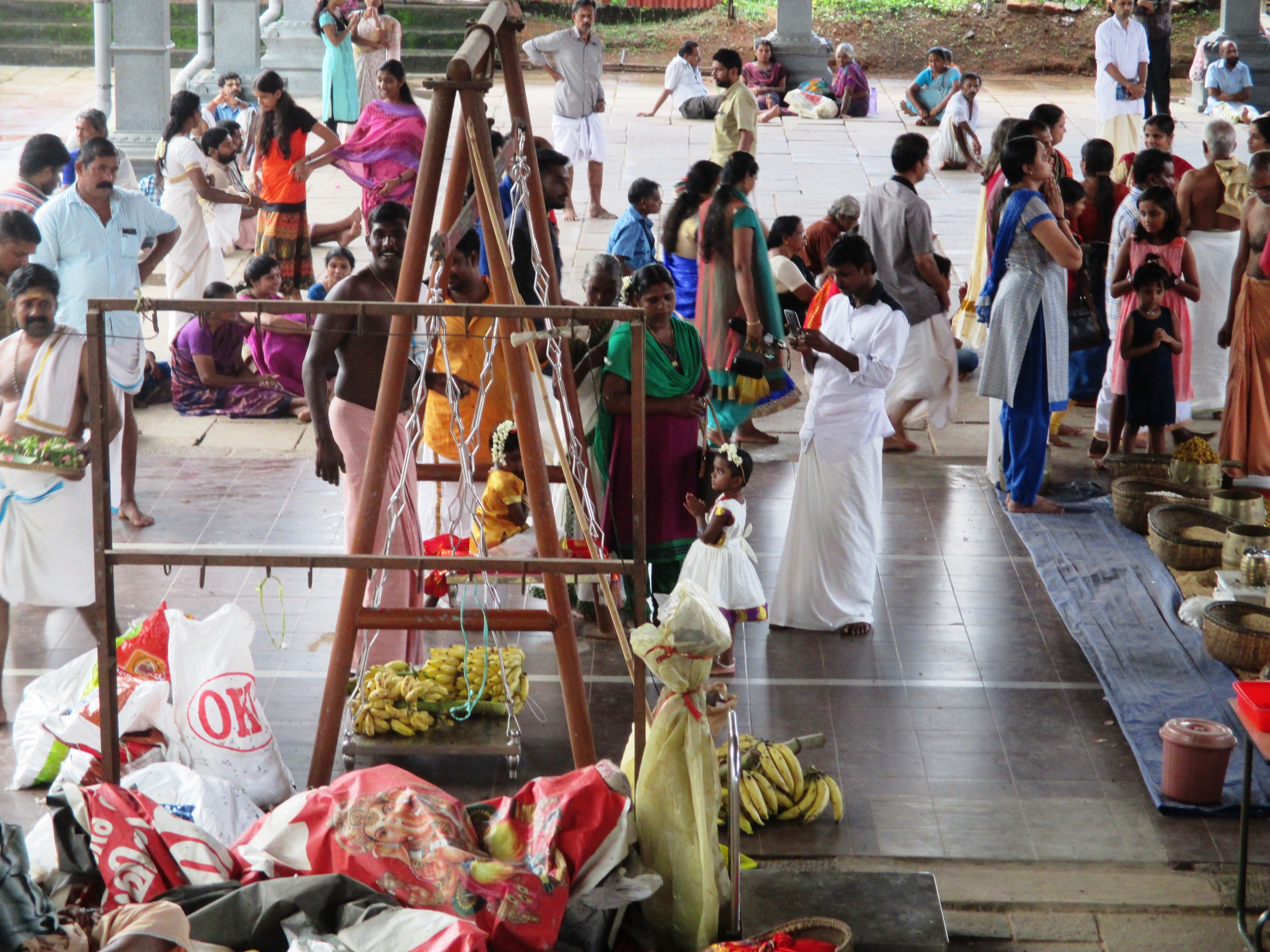
A tulabhara donation of bananas in progress at the Chottanikkara Temple in Kerala

Tulabhara, also known as Tula-purusha (IAST: Tulāpuruṣa) or Tula-dana, is an ancient Hindu practice in which a person is weighed against a commodity (such as gold, grain, fruits or other objects), and the equivalent weight of that commodity is offered as donation. The Tulabhara is mentioned as one of the sixteen great gifts in the ancient texts, and is performed in several parts of India.

== Names ==
The Atharvaveda-parishishta uses the name "tula-purusha-vidhi" to describe the ceremony. The Matsya Purana calls it "tula-purusha-dana", while the Linga Purana calls it by various names such as "tula-purusha-dana", "tuladhirohana", "tularoha", and "tulabhara".

Majority of the ancient inscriptions that record the ceremony are written in Sanskrit language; some of them are in Tamil and Kannada, and some later inscriptions also feature Telugu language.

The early Sanskrit-Tamil inscriptions from Tamil Nadu and Sinhala-Tamil inscriptions from Sri Lanka used the name "tula-bhara" (literally "weighing on the scales") to describe the ceremony.

The Sanskrit inscriptions from other regions, the Kannada inscriptions, and the Puranas generally use the name "tula-purusha" and its variants. "Tula-purusha" is the most common name for the ceremony in the historical records. The longer forms are "tula-purusha-dana" or "tula-purusha-mahadana", which are sometimes abbreviated as "tula-dana" (the words "dana" and "mahadana" mean "donation" and "great donation" respectively).

The 13th century inscriptions from Tamil Nadu also use the terms "tularohana" (or "tularoha") and "tuladhiroha-vidhi" (or "tuladhirohana") for the ceremony.

== Description ==
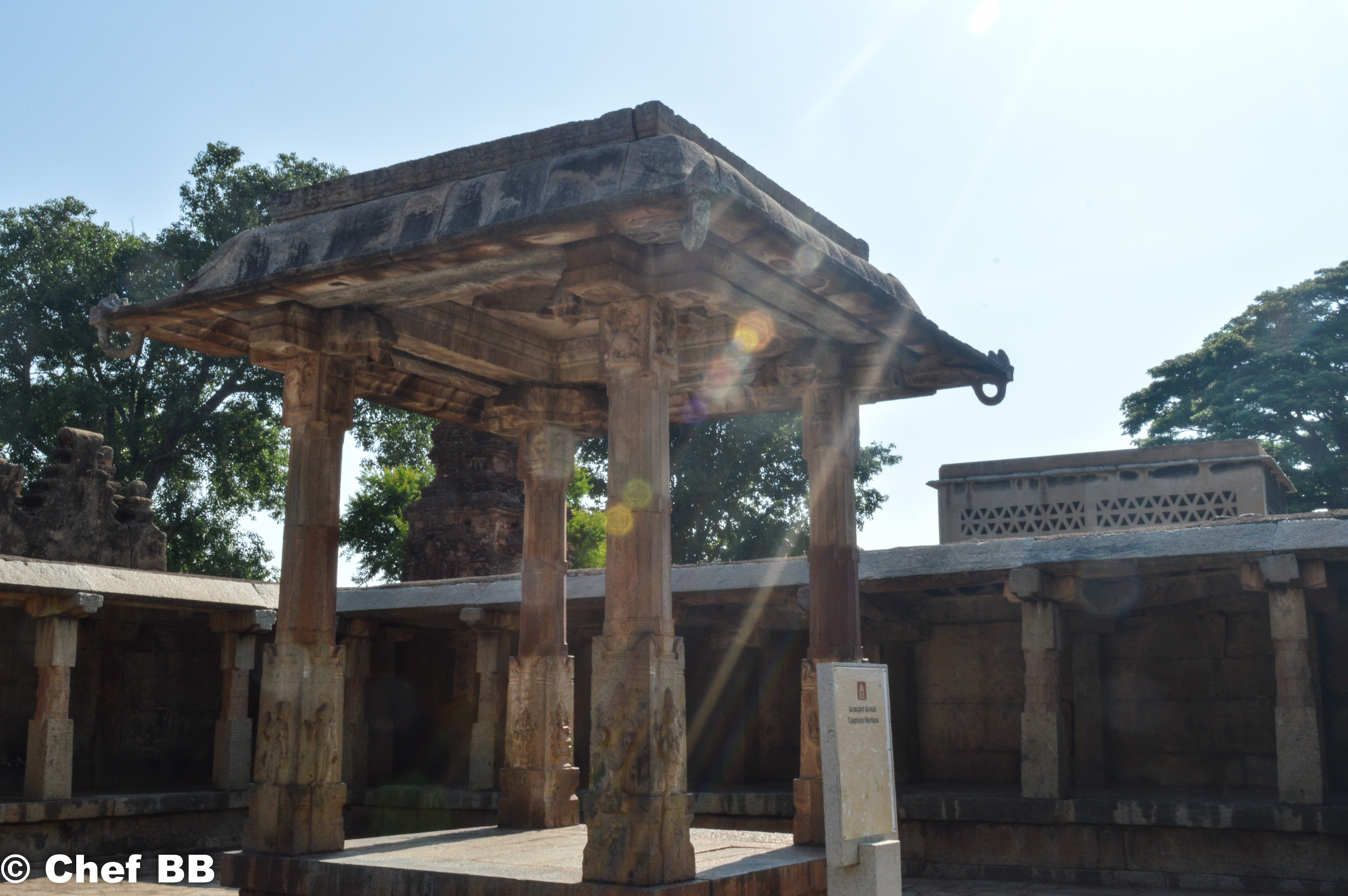
A Tulabhara mandapa at the Bhoga Nandeeshwara Temple

The Matsya Purana provides several requirements for a tula-purusha ceremony, including directions for constructing the mandapa (pavilion) required for the ceremony. It states that the weighing scale (tula) should have two posts and a crossbeam, made from the same wood, and should be ornamented with gold.

The text further states that the ceremony should be officiated by eight priests (rtvij), two for each of the four Vedas. A man knowledgeable about the Vedanta, the Puranas, and the Shastras, should be appointed as the preceptor (guru). Four homas should be offered to the deities, accompanied by the recital of Vedic hymns. After the homa ceremony, the guru should invoke the Lokapalas (deities associated with directions) with flowers, incense, and recital of mantras. Next, the brahmanas should bathe the donor, and have him wear a white garment. The donor should wear garlands made of white flowers, and circumambulate the weighing scale with flowers in his folded hands.

Finally, the text states, the donor should step into one of the pans of the weighing scale, and the brahmanas should place pure gold pieces of equal weight in the other pan. After invoking the Goddess Earth, the donor should give half the gold to the guru, and the rest to the brahmanas. The donor may also grant villages to the priests. The donor should "honour the brahmanas, other respectable people, and the poor and the helpless with gifts".

The Linga Purana gives a similar description, and adds that the gold pieces should be dedicated to the god Shiva.

== History ==
The Atharvaveda-parishishta, composed in the 1st millennium BCE, describes tula-purusha, besides other sacrifices such as the hiranya-garbha (the donation of a golden vessel) and gosahasra (the donation of a thousand cows). A section of the later text Matsya Purana mentions the tula-purusha ceremony as the first and the best among the sixteen great gifts (maha-danas). According to scholar R. C. Hazara, this particular section was composed during 550-650 CE.

The Linga Purana also mentions the sixteen great donations; according to R. C. Hazara, the relevant portion of the text was composed during c. 600-1000 CE, most probably after 800 CE. These donations are also described in the later digests devoted to the topic of charity (dāna), such as Ballala's Dana-sagara, and the Danakhanda section of Hemadri's Chaturvarga-chintamani (13th century).

== Performances ==
=== Legendary ===
Several legendary performances of Tulabhara are mentioned in the ancient Indian texts. For example, in the Mahabharata, King Shibi, a descendant of King Bharata of the Lunar dynasty, was tested by Indra and Agni. They approached Shibi in the forms of an eagle and a dove. The dove sought Shibi's protection from the eagle, who asked Shibi to give his flesh measure for measure in exchange for the dove's life. Shibi, ready to offer anything to save the dove, began slice off bits of himself. Even after much cutting, the balance scales did not move, and when at last when Shibi himself stood on the scale of the balance, the gods appeared to him and blessed him.

Another legend of the Tulabhara relates to Krishna and his queen-consorts, Rukmini and Satyabhama. In the Bhagavata Purana, Satyabhama is described to have often attempted to prove her superiority over the other wives of Krishna, especially his principal wife, Rukmini. The sage Narada once incited Satyabhama into undertaking a vrata (vow) in which she had to "donate" her husband to the former, and pay the latter's weight in gold to regain him. She had Krishna sit upon one side of the weighing scale, and poured all of her gold jewellery upon the other end. The scale did not budge. Swallowing her pride, Satyabhama sought the assistance of Rukmini. Rukmini placed a tulasi (basil) leaf upon the other end of the scale, regarded to represent her love for Krishna, which immediately balanced the scales.

=== Historical ===
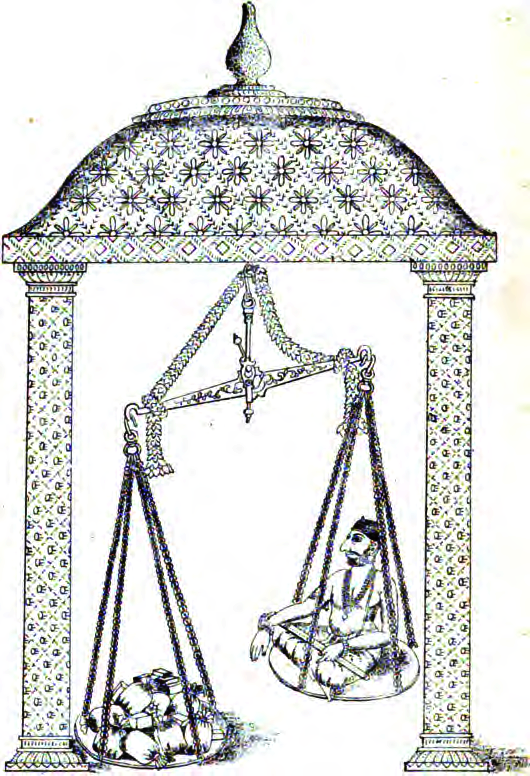
18th century king Marthanda Varma participating in a tulabhara ceremony

Several inscriptions of India mention the historical performances of the tula-purusha. The earliest of these inscriptions are from the present-day Tamil Nadu (7th-8th century) and Maharashtra-Karnataka region (8th-9th century). It is possible that the tula-purusha ceremony traveled from the southern Pandya kingdom of Tamil Nadu to Maharashtra-Karnataka, which was ruled by the Rashtrakutas. It may have subsequently spread to other neighbouring areas, such as Madhya Pradesh (from Maharashtra), Andhra Pradesh (from Karnataka), and Sri Lanka (from Tamil Nadu).

Notable performers include:

- Pandya kings (7th-8th century), in Tamil Nadu
  - Jayantavarman alias Cendan (c. 7th century), according to one of his inscriptions, performed tulabhara along with hiranyagarbha and gosahasra.
  - An inscription of the Pandya king Varaguna I (r. c. 768–811) states that his father and grandfather made these three donations many times.
  - It is stated in the Tamil work Koyilolugu that Jatavarman Sundara Pandya (r. c. 1250–1268) constructed several tulapurusha mandapas in Srirangam temple and performed tulabhara there.
- Rashtrakuta kings (8th-10th century), in Maharashtra-Karnataka region
  - Dantidurga donated a village to a brahmana on the occasion of a tulabhara performance according to an inscription discovered in the Kolhapur district.
  - Govinda III (c. 800) performed a tulabhara ceremony at Mayurakhandi on the occasion of a solar eclipse.
  - Amoghavarsha I (c. 862) also performed a tulabhara ceremony during a solar eclipse.
  - Indra III (c. 915) performed tulabhara on the occasion of his coronation, and granted villages to brahmanas and Jain monasteries.
  - Govinda IV performed at least three tulabharas during c. 929–930, to mark his coronation and that of his queen.
  - A vassal of Amoghavarsha III celebrated tulabhara in 937.
- Pallava kings (9th century), in Tamil Nadu
  - Viramahadevi (c. 891), a queen of the Pallava ruler Nrpatungavarman performed tulapurusha and hiranyagarbha ceremony in a Mahadeva temple.
- Chola kings (10th-11th century), in Tamil Nadu
  - Parantaka I (r. c. 907–955) made tulabhara, hemagarbha and other donations according to an inscription of his Ganga vassal Prithvipati II.
  - During the ruler of Rajaraja I (r. c. 985–1016) a temple for performing tulabhara (tulavara-shri-koyil) existed at Uttiramerur. Around 1013, Rajaraja held a tulabhara ceremony at the Mahadeva temple of Tiruvishalur, where his consort Lokamahadevi simultaneously performed a hiranyagarbha donation.
- Amma I of the Vengi Chalukya dynasty performed a tulabhara annually during his seven-year-long reign.
- Dhanga (r. c. 950-999 CE) of Chandela dynasty claimed to have performed hundreds of tulapurusha rituals, in his Khajuraho inscription.
- The Gwalior inscription of the Kachchhapaghata king Mahipala states that one of his ancestors celebrated tulapurusha in the 10th century.
- Yashahkarna (r. c. 1073-1123 CE) of Kalachuri dynasty, according to his inscriptions.
- Chalukyas of Kalyani
  - Jayasimha III, a member of the younger brother and a vassal of the Kalyani Chalukya king Vikramaditya VI (r. 1076 – 1126 CE).
  - Jayakeshin II of Kadamba family, another vassal of Vikramaditya VI
  - Hoysala kings (10th-14th century), including Vishnuvardhana and his successors

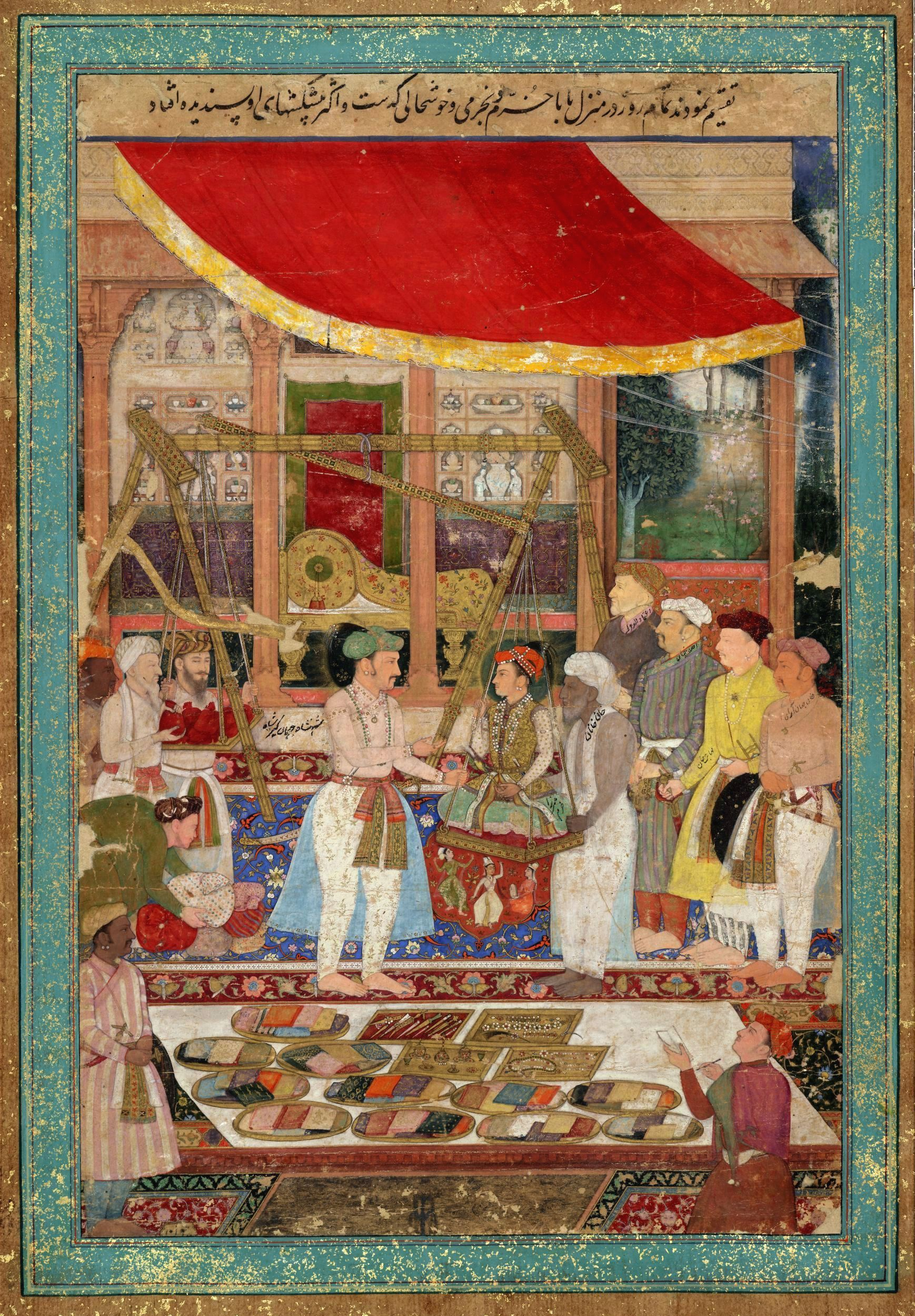
Emperor Jahangir weighing his son Prince Khurram (the future Shah Jahan) on a weighing scale, by artist Manohar (AD 1615)

- Chandradeva (r. c. 1089–1103 CE) of Gahadavala dynasty. According to his inscriptions, "the earth was discoloured hundreds of times by the scales" when he donated gold worth his own weight to the brahmanas. His Chandravati inscription records a village grant after the performance of tulapurusha and gosahasra before an image of the god Adi-keshava (Vishnu).
- The Shilahara king Gandaraditya celebrated tulapurusha, according to the inscriptions of his grandson Bhoja II.
- Vilasadevi, the queen of king Vijaya Sena (r. c. 1098–1160) of Sena dynasty, during the king's 32nd regnal year.
- Jayachandra (r. c. 1170-1194 CE) of Gahadavala dynasty: his Kamauli grant inscription states that he performed a tula-purusha before the god Krittivasa (Shiva).
- Chandeshvara, a minister of the king of Mithila: according to his own writings, he conquered Nepal and performed a tula-purusha in c. 1314 CE (Shaka year 1236).
- Tulabhara mandapas are two small four pillared found in temples like Sri Varadharajaswami temple, Kanchi where Vijayanagar king Achyutaraya performed Muladhara in 1532.
- The rulers of Travancore, until as late as the 19th century, performed tula-purusha and hiranya-garbha immediately ascending the throne to legitimize their claim to power.

The Islamic Mughal rulers also appear to have borrowed the tula-dana practice from the Hindu rulers. According to emperor Akbar's courtier Abu'l-Fazl, Akbar was weighed against gold and other valuable items twice every year. English visitors such as Thomas Coryat and Thomas Roe mention that the custom was followed by his son Jahangir as well. Jahangir's successor Aurangzeb discontinued the practice for himself, but his sons were apparently weighed against objects to be donated, upon recovery from illness. This is suggested by the writings of the European travelers Niccolao Manucci, Jean-Baptiste Tavernier, and François Bernier.

In 2015, the Sri Lankan prime minister Ranil Wickramasinghe participated in a tulabharam ceremony at the Guruvayur Temple, and offered 77 kg of sandalwood worth approximately ₹ 850,000 to the temple.

== See also ==
- Dāna
