= Sixteen great gifts =

Category of ritual donations mentioned in the Puranic texts of ancient India

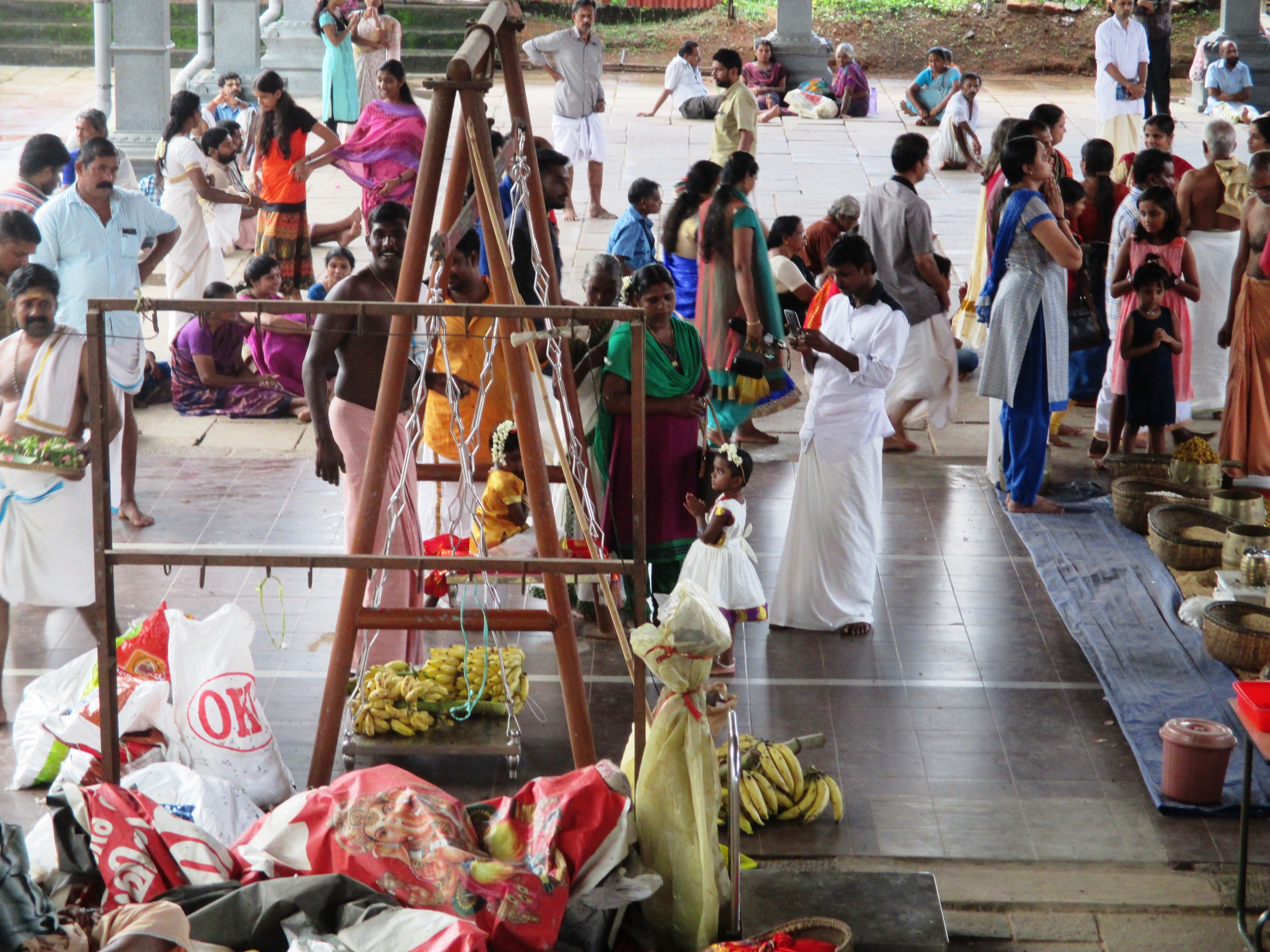
A modern adaptation of the tulapurusha ceremony: the girl is being weighed against the bananas (in place of gold); the bananas would be donated after the ceremony

The sixteen great gifts (Sanskrit: षोडश-महा-दान; IAST: Ṣoḍaśa-Mahā-dāna) refers to a category of ritual donations mentioned in the Puranic texts of ancient India.

The most prominent of these donations include the tula-purusha — weighing of a person and the donation of equivalent weight in gold, and hiranya-garbha — the donation of a golden pot.

== History ==
The earliest inscriptions that mention the sixteen great gifts as a category date from the 8th century onward, but these great gifts have been described in the earlier literature, such as the Matsya Purana. Some of these donations included in the category pre-date the concept of sixteen great gifts. For example, the Atharvaveda-parishishta, composed in the 1st millennium BCE, describes tula-purusha, hiranya-garbha, and gosahasra.

The section of the Matsya Purana that mentions the sixteen great gifts appears to have been composed during 550-650 CE. It states that several ancient kings performed the great gifts. The Linga Purana also mentions the sixteen great donations; according to R. C. Hazara, the relevant portion of the text was composed during c. 600-1000 CE, most probably after 800 CE. The great gifts are also described in the later digests devoted to the topic of charity (dāna), such as Ballala's Dana-sagara, and the Danakhanda section of Hemadri's Chaturvarga-chintamani (13th century).

The Chalukya king Pulakeshin I (c. 540-567) is known to have performed the hiranyagarbha ritual (although not mentioned as a Great Gift) to proclaim his sovereignty. The earliest known epigraphically-attested donations called the "great gifts" were made by the 7th century Pandya king Jayantavarman (alias Cendan). According to his inscription, the king performed three of the great gifts: hiranya-garbha, go-sahasra, and tula-pursuha. The Rashtrakuta king Dantidurga (c. 753 CE) performed a Great Gift (mahadana) ceremony, apparently as a replacement for the Vedic shrauta rituals. By the time of the imperial Cholas (c. 10th century), the Great Gift ceremony had become the principal sign of a king's beneficence, overlordship, and independence.

The inscriptions of the Gahadavala dynasty (11th-12th century) mention three of the great gifts: tulapurusha, gosahasra, and pancha-langala (or pancha-langalaka). The Chandela king Dhanga (r. c. 950-999 CE) and the Kalachuri king Yashahkarna (r. c. 1073-1123 CE) are known to have performed tulapurusha. The Sena king Lakshmana Sena (r. c. 1178-1206) performed the great gift of Hemashva-ratha, otherwise called Hiranyashva-ratha.

In the Vijayanagara Empire of the 14th-16th centuries, the Great Gift ceremonies were used to proclaim the rulers' beneficence and independence. For example, the Nallur inscription of king Harihara II of Vijayanagara Empire mentions that he performed the sixteen great gifts.

== List of the great gifts ==
The sixteen great gifts, according to the Matsya Purana, are as follows: (names in IAST)

1. Tulā-puruṣa (Tula-purusha), the gift of the man on the scales (weighing of a person and donation of equivalent weight in gold)
2. Hiraṇya-garbha, the gift of the golden embryo (pot)
3. Brahmāṇḍa, the gift of the Brahma-egg
4. Kalpa-pādapa, the gift of the wish-granting tree
5. Go-sahasra, the gift of a thousand cows
6. Hiraṇya-kāmadhenu, the gift of the wish-granting cow
7. Hiraṇyāśva (Hiranyashva), the gift of the golden horse
8. Pañca-lāṅgala (Pancha-langala), the gift of the five ploughshares
9. Dhārā (or Prithvi), the gift of the earth
10. Hiraṇyāśva-ratha (Hiranyashva-ratha), the gift of the golden horse chariot
11. Hema-hasti-ratha, the gift of the golden elephant chariot
12. Viṣṇu-cakra (Vishnu-chakra), the gift of the universal wheel
13. Kalpa-latā, the gift of the wish-granting vines
14. Sapta-sāgara, the gift of the seven seas
15. Ratna-dhenu, the gift of the jewel-cow
16. Mahā-bhūta-ghaṭa, the gift of the pot of elements

The two most-frequently mentioned great gifts in the historical records are tula-purusha and hiranya-garbha. The Matysa Purana mentions tula-purusha as the first and the best among the sixteen great gifts.
