= Economy of Western Ganga kingdom =

Ancient Indian economics

The Economy of Western Ganga kingdom (350 – 1000 CE) (Kannada: ಪಶ್ಚಿಮ ಗಂಗ ಸಂಸ್ಥಾನ) refers to the economic structure that existed during the rule of this important ruling dynasty of ancient Karnataka. They are known as Western Gangas to distinguish them from the Eastern Gangas who in later centuries ruled over modern Orissa. The Western Ganga sovereignty lasted from about 350 to 550, initially ruling from Kolar and later moving their capital to Talakad on the banks of the Kaveri River in modern Mysore district. Later, they ruled as an important feudatory of larger empires, the imperial Chalukyas of Badami and the Rashtrakutas of Manyakheta.

== Economy ==
In the late 10th century, major political changes were taking place in the Deccan. The Rashtrakutas were replaced by the emerging Western Chalukya Empire north of the Tungabhadra river and the Chola Dynasty saw renewed power south of the Kaveri river. The defeat of the Western Gangas to Cholas around 1000 resulted in the end of the Ganga influence over the region. Though territorially a small kingdom, the Western Ganga contribution to polity, culture and literature of the modern south Karnataka region is considered important. The Western Ganga kings showed benevolent tolerance to all faiths but are most famous for their patronage towards Jainism resulting in the construction of fine monuments in such places as Shravanabelagola and Kambadahalli. The kings of this dynasty encouraged the fine arts due to which literature in Kannada and Sanskrit flourished. 9th century Kannada writings refer to King Durvinita of the 6th century as an early writer in Kannada language prose. Many classics were written on various subjects ranging from religion to elephant management. The Gangavadi region consists of the malnad region, the plains (Bayaluseemae) and semi-malnad with lower elevation and rolling hills being the buffer region. The main crops of the malnad were paddy, betel leaves, cardamom and pepper and semi-malnad with its lower altitude produced rice, millets such as ragi and corn, pulses, oilseeds and was the base for cattle farming. The plains to the east are the flat lands fed by Kaveri, Tungabhadra and Vedavati rivers where cultivation of sugarcane, paddy, orchards of coconut, areca nut (adeka totta), betel leaves, plantain and flowers (vara vana) were cultivated. The importance of excavation of new irrigation tanks and repairs to existing ones are reflected in epigraphs of the period which phrase it as Arasaru Kattida Kere (tank built by the king) Elites such as gavundas (landlord), feudatory rulers, officials, mahajans (Brahmins), traders (setti) and even artisans contributed to tank building. Other sources of water were wells, natural ponds and catchments of dams (Katta). Inscriptions attesting to irrigation of previously uncultivated lands seems to indicate an expanding agrarian community.

Soil types that existed in various parts of the kingdom are mentioned, the earliest reference being a record of black soil (Karimaniya) in the Sinda-8000 territory and to red soil (Kebbayya mannu) Cultivated land was of three types; wet land, dry land and to a lesser extent garden land with paddy being the dominant crop of the region. Wet lands were called kalani, galde, nir mannu or nir panya and was specifically used to denote paddy land requiring standing water. A type of grain was harvested from a tall stout grass called Sejje. Lands adjoining irrigation tanks were called maduvinamannu and was used for coconut and areca nut cultivation if the land was not extensive enough for paddy. Terrace type paddy cultivated land in the highlands was called makki. Millet, wheat (syamaka), barley and pulses were also cultivated to a smaller extent.

The fact that pastoral economies were spread throughout Gangavadi region comes from references to cowherds in many inscriptions. The terms gosahasra (a thousand cows), gasara (owner of cows), gosasi (donor of cows), goyiti (cowherdess), gosasa (protector of cows) attest to this. Donation of a thousand cows are mentioned though the actual number may have been fewer indicating that ownership of cows may have been as important as cultivable land and that there may have existed a social hierarchy based on this. References to shepherds are uncommon though one inscription calls them Kurimbadere and the hamlets where they lived Kuripatti. Inscriptions mention cattle raids attesting to the importance of the pastoral economy, destructive raids, assaults on women (pendir-udeyulcal), abduction of women by bedas (hunter tribes), a result of the existing militarism of the age. Evidence shows that the gavundas, the people closely involved with land, its cultivation and cattle were chiefly involved in both defence against and responsible for such raids.

Lands that were exempt from taxes were called manya and sometimes consisted of several villages. They were granted by local chieftains without any reference to the overlord, indicating a de-centralised economy. These lands, often given to heroes who perished in the line of duty was called bilavritti or kalnad. Sarva parihara (or sarva badha parihara) lands were those that were free from all or most taxes. Talavritti land grants were exempt from tax overheads, made without consent of the king for the maintenance of temples at the time of consecration. Abhyantra siddi was an internal income or revenue payable to the village authorities even lower than the local chieftain. It may have also meant settlement of disputes over land by local authorities. Some types of taxes on income were kara or anthakara (internal taxes), utkota were presents due to the king and hiranya were cash payments and sulika was tolls and duties levied on imported items. Taxes were collected from those who held the right to cultivate land, whether the land was actually cultivated or not.

Siddhaya was a local tax levied on agriculture and pottondi was levied on merchandise by the local feudal ruler. At times, based on context, pottondi meant 1/10 (a fraction), aydalavi meant 1/5, elalavi meant 1/7. Mannadare literally meant land tax and was levied together with shepherds tax (Kurimbadere) payable to the chief of shepherds. Karudere and addadere taxes were collectable by corporate bodies from settlements outside their own area. Bhaga was used to denote portion or share of the produce from land or the land area itself. Minor taxes such as Kirudere due to the landlords, samathadere raised by the army officers (samantha) are mentioned. In addition to taxes for maintenance of the local officer's retinue, villages were obligated to feed armies on the march to and from battle. Waste land and forest land which were more frequently granted in the eastern regions of the kingdom included brahmadeya (grants to Brahmins) and agricultural grants. Bittuvatta or niravari taxes comprised usually of a percentage of the produce and was collected for constructing irrigation tanks.
