= Kalinga (region) =

Historical region of India

- Region
- Kalinga among Vedic states
- Interactive map of Kalinga
- Country: India
- State: Odisha (central and southern); Andhra Pradesh (northern)
- Established: c. 1100 BCE
- Founder: King Kalinga of Mahabharata

Languages
  - Spoken: Odia, Telugu (only in parts of Northern AP)
- Time zone: UTC+5:30 (IST)
- Ancient and Medieval Capitals: Tosali, Sisupalgarh, Dantapuram, Prishtapura, Kalinganagara, Cuttack, Jajpur

Kalinga (Sanskrit: [kɐliŋɡɐ]) is a historical region of India. It is generally defined as the eastern coastal region between the Ganges and the Godavari rivers, although its boundaries have fluctuated with the territory of its rulers. The core territory of Kalinga now encompasses all of Odisha and some part of northern Andhra Pradesh. At its widest extent, the Kalinga region also included parts of present-day Chhattisgarh, extending up to Amarkantak in the west. In the ancient period it extended until the bank of the Ganges river.

The Kalingas have been mentioned as a major tribe in the legendary text Mahabharata. In the 3rd century BCE, the region came under Mauryan control as a result of the Kalinga War. It was subsequently ruled by several regional dynasties whose rulers bore the title Kalingādhipati ("Lord of Kalinga"); these dynasties included Mahameghavahana, Vasishtha, Mathara, Pitrbhakta, Shailodbhava, Bhaumkara, Somavamshi, and Eastern Ganga. The medieval era rulers to rule over the Kalinga region were the Suryavamsa Gajapatis, Bhoi dynasty, Paralakhemundi Gangas and the zamindaris of Ganjam and Vizagapatam.

== Extent ==
Extreme points of Kalinga, as mentioned in the historical records

The Kalinga region is generally defined as the eastern coastal region between Ganges and the Godavari rivers. However, its exact boundaries have fluctuated at various times in the history. According to political scientist Sudama Misra, the Kalinga janapada originally comprised the area covered by the Puri and Ganjam districts. Confirming the existence till the river Ganga DK Ganguly used references from accounts of Pliny and the Mahabharata. He wrote " Pliny has evidently made an unnecessary duplication. Unfortunately the identification of these tribes and their location are rendered difficult by the nature of the description which appears to be erroneous and confusing. Pliny was guided by his notion about the existence of more than one Kalinga settlement from which the Indian writers are also not completely free. But the above account of Pliny is important for it shows that Kalinga extended in the north-east up to the Ganges. That the territory of the Kalingas stretched onwards from the Ganges seems to be corroborated by the following passages of the Trithyatra section of the Vanaparvam." Scholars like RC Majumdar mentions Kalinga was from Mahanadi to Godavari. However the simple mention of Ganga as the northern boundary of Kalinga by Pliny as stated above and Mahabharata talking about Baitarani, a river which is north of Mahanadi and borders Odisha and Jharkhand at one point and falls into Bay of Bengal in Bhadrak district of Odisha, passing through Kalinga, nullifies this claim. It looks like Prof. Majumdar has focused Gupta period when Kalinga indeed had shrunk till Mahanadi in north. Some Jain chronicles while describing about Jain Tirthankara Pasvanath notes, when he came to Kalinga to preach Jainism, he took rest in a place in Balasore district of Odisha. Balasore is north of Baitarani river and borders Bengal. This also confirms Kalinga extending north of Baitarani River.

In the ancient Indian literature, the Kalinga region is associated with the Mahendragiri mountain located in the Ganjam district of Odisha, near its border with Andhra Pradesh.

At times, the southern border of Kalinga extended further up to the Krishna River.The Kalinga region encompasses the whole of present-dayOdisha: the north-eastern part of Odisha was included in the distinct Utkala region. Utkala gradually lost its identity, and came to be considered as a part of Kalinga. In the Adiparva of Mahabharata it is mentioned that Arjuna moved to Kalinga crossing Ganga. Interestingly, it distinguishes Kalinga from Mahendragiri. That means only north of Mahendragiri till Ganga river was considered Kalinga then. Arjuna was moving from north to south in the eastern part of India. Adiparva mentions he moved from Gaya and Ganga then came to Anga, Vanga and Kalinga. In the Gupta period Kalinga was subdivided into smaller countries. After the decline of Guptas, the Matharas were one of the kingdoms who claimed to rule over Kalinga by acquiring the title of Kalingādhipati. The Mathara territory stretched from Mahanadi, which is believed to be Badanadi or Bara river in Southern Ganjam(literally meaning "big river", same as Mahanadi, Badanadi or Badanai was also locally called Mahanadi until 20th century) in the north to Godavari in south along the east coast, since all the inscriptions by them and the localities mentioned in them were within these two rivers. Like the Matharas, the Pitrbhaktas and subsequently the early Eastern Gangas continued to use the title of Kalingādhipati ruling over the same region. The Vigrahas of South Toshali whose territory comprised the region south of Mahanadi also claimed to rule over Kalinga-rashtra ("Kalinga kingdom"). The Vigrahas were ousted by Mudgalas of North Toshali or Utkala by 603–04 CE who themselves were invaded by Shashanka. The Shailodbhavas who emerged as Maha-Samanta of Shashanka declared themselves independent after 620 CE and acquired the title of Sakala-Kalingādhipati ("Lord of whole of Kalinga"). The Bhauma-Karas took over the Shailodbhava territory and made the Eastern-Gangas their feudatories, and the Somavamshis under Janmejaya made inroads into the Bhauma-Kara kingdom up to coastal Odisha and acquired the title of Trikalingādhipati ("Lord of the three Kalingas"). The Gajapati Empire of Odisha in 15-16th century was known as Kalinga in some of the contemporary sources.

The eastern boundary of Kalinga was formed by the sea (the Bay of Bengal). Its western boundary is difficult to pinpoint, as it varied with the political power of its rulers. However, the Puranic literature suggests that Kalinga extended up to the Amarakantaka hills in the west.

Several ancient inscriptions mention the term "Trikalinga", which has been interpreted in several ways. According to one theory, Trikalinga refers to the widest extent of Kalinga. However, the Eastern Chalukya records suggest that Kalinga and Trikalinga were two distinct regions, with Trikalinga denoting the hilly region to the west of Kalinga.

Some scholars have misinterpreted the text of Mahabharata and have said river Vaitarani was the northern border of Kalinga. However the text says river Vaitarani passes through Kalinga and Pandavas came to Kalinga after crossing Ganga. Therefore, this assumption is wrong. In the south it was bounded by the country of the Āndhras, although its southern border varied often and reached Elamanchili and Cheepurupalli in the Visakhapatnam district or even Piṣṭapura or Pithapuram to the north-east of the Godāvarī river, although it did not reach the river itself, which was in Āndhra territory. On the west, Kaliṅga had established its suzerainty over the tribes in inland hills so that its authority reached till the Amarakaṇṭaka range.

== History ==
=== Antiquity ===
The name of the region is derived from a tribe of the same name. According to the legendary text Mahabharata, the progenitors of the Kalingas and of their neighbouring tribes were brothers. These neighbours included the Angas, the Vangas, the Pundras, and the Suhmas.

The Kalingas occupied the extensive territory stretching from river Baitarani in Odisha to the Varahanandi in the Visakhapatnam district. Its capital in the ancient times was the city of Dantakura or Dantapura (now Dantavaktra fort near Chicacole in the Srikakulam district, washed by the river Languliya or Langulini).

The kingdom of Kaliṅga was already existent at the time of the Brahmana texts, which mention its king Karaṇḍu as a contemporary of Nagnajit of Gāndhāra and of Bhīma of Vidarbha.

According to the Mahāgovinda Suttanta, the king Sattabhu of Kaliṅga was a contemporary of Reṇu of Videha and Dhataraṭṭha or Dhṛtarāṣṭra of Kāsī.

Kaliṅga was mentioned by both Pāṇini and Baudhāyana, with the latter considering it as a part of India.

=== Ancient Kalinga : Kalinga kingdom (c. 1100 – 261 BCE) ===
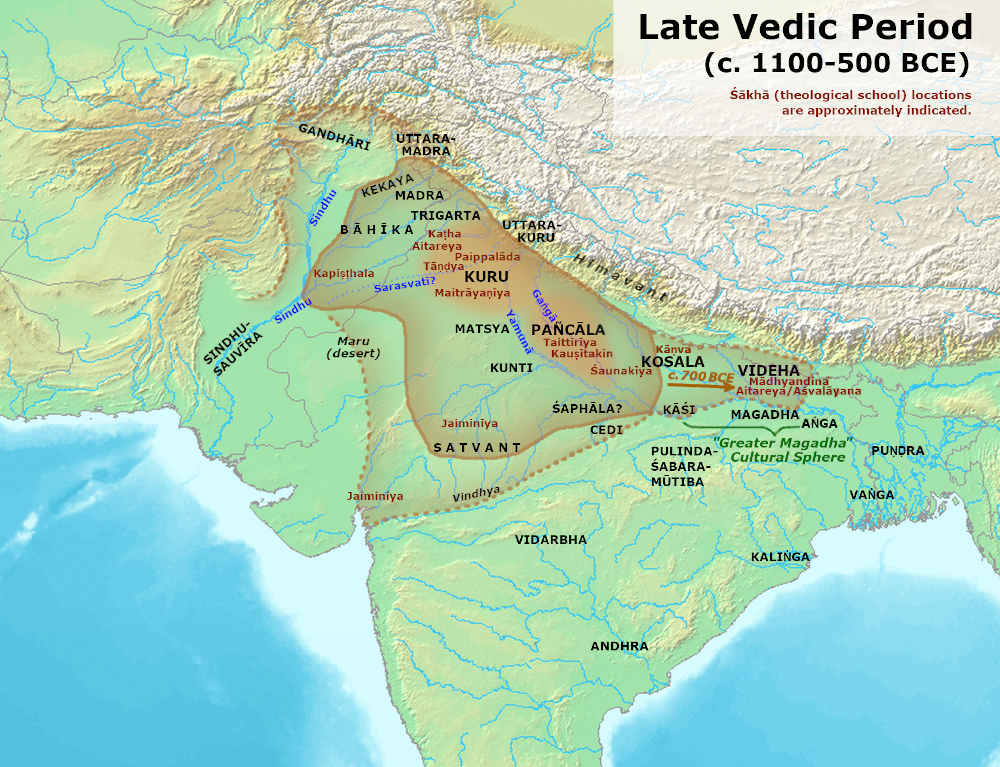
Kalinga located in eastern Indian coast, in Vedic period in c. 1100 BCE

==== Kalinga dynasty (I) (c. 1100 – 700 BCE) ====
According to Mahabharata and some Puranas, the prince 'Kalinga' founded the Kalinga kingdom, in the current day region of coastal Odisha, including the North Sircars. The Mahabharata also mentions one 'Srutayudha' as the king of the Kalinga kingdom, who joined the Kaurava camp. In the Buddhist text, Mahagovinda Suttanta, Kalinga and its ruler, 'Sattabhu', have been mentioned.

Known rulers are –

- King Kalinga, (founder of Kalinga kingdom)
- King Odra, (founder of Odra kingdom)
- Srutayudha
- Srutayush
- Manimat
- Chitrangada
- Subahu
- Virasena
- Sudatta
- Nalikira
- Yavanaraj
- Dantavakkha or Dantavakhra (c. 9th century BCE)
- Avakinnayo Karakandu (c. late 9th to early 8th century BCE)
- Vasupala (c. 8th century BCE)

==== Kalinga dynasty (II) (c. 700 – 350 BCE) ====
This dynasty is mentioned in Chullakalinga Jataka and Kalingabodhi Jataka. The last ruler of First Kalinga dynasty is said to have broken away from the Danda kingdom along with the kings of Asmaka and Vidarbha as its feudal states, and established rule of Second Kalinga dynasty.

Known rulers are –

- Dandaki
- Mahakalinga
- Chullakalinga
- Kalinga II (c. 7th – 6th century BCE)

Other or late Kalinga rulers according to Dāṭhavaṃsa are –

This was probably another dynasty or late rulers of Second Kalinga dynasty, which is mentioned in Dāṭhavaṃsa.

Known rulers are –

- Brahmadatta (c. 6th – 5th century BCE)
- Sattabhu
- Kasiraja
- Sunanda
- Guhasiva

==== Suryavamsha of Kalinga (c. 350 – 261 BCE) ====
Known rulers are –

- Brahmaadittiya (c. 4th century BCE)

His son, prince 'Soorudasaruna-Adeettiya' was exiled and as per Maldivian history, established the first kingdom Dheeva Maari and laid the foundation of the Adeetta dynasty (Aditta Vansa).

=== Pre-classical Kalinga ===
==== Annexation by Nanda Empire (c. 345 – 322 BCE) ====
Kalinga was believed to be briefly annexed by Nanda ruler Mahapadma Nanda between 345 and 340 BCE.

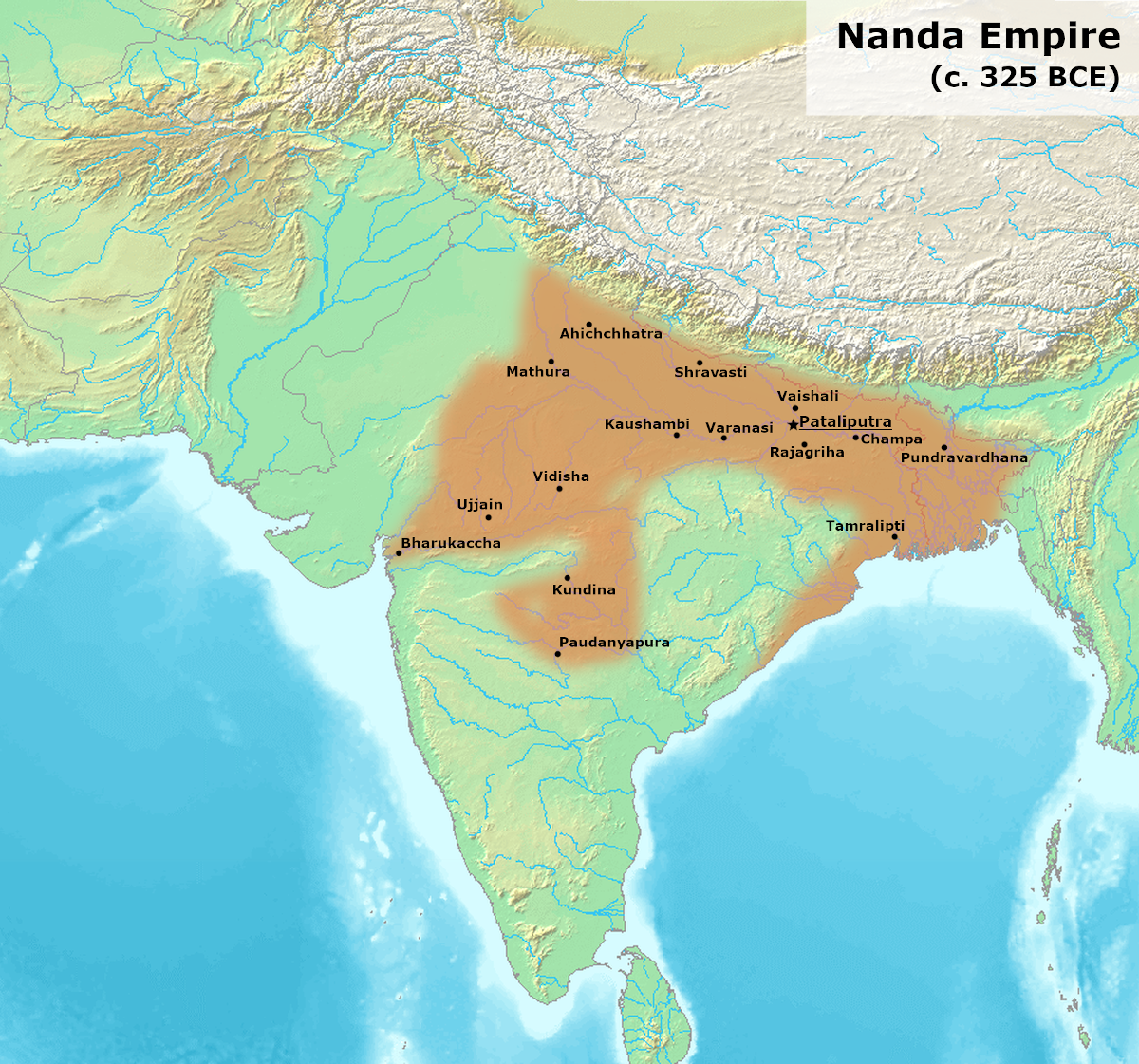
Possible extent of the Nanda Empire under its last ruler Dhana Nanda

The Nanda empire appears to have stretched from present-day Punjab in the west to Odisha (Kalinga) in the east. Nandas control of Kalinga region is corroborated by the Hathigumpha inscription of the later king Kharavela (c. 2nd or 1st century BCE).

When Chandragupta Maurya rebelled against the Nandas, Kalingas broke away from the empire of Magadha in 322 BCE.

==== Hathigumpha Inscription of Kalinga ====
The Hathigumpha inscription suggests that a king named Nandaraja had excavated an aqueduct there in the past. Assuming that Nandaraja refers to a king of the Nanda dynasty, it appears that the Kalinga region was annexed by the Nandas at some point. It appears to have become independent again after the fall of the Nandas. It is described as "Calingae" in Megasthenes' Indica (3rd century BCE):

The Prinas and the Cainas (a tributary of the Ganges) are both navigable rivers. The tribes which dwell by the Ganges are the Calingae, nearest the sea, and higher up the Mandei, also the Malli, among whom is Mount Mallus, the boundary of all that region being the Ganges.

— Megasthenes fragm. XX.B. in Pliny. Hist. Nat. V1. 21.9–22. 1.

The royal city of the Calingae is called Parthalis. Over their king 60,000 foot-soldiers, 1,000 horsemen, 700 elephants keep watch and ward in "procinct of war."

— Megasthenes fragm. LVI. in Plin. Hist. Nat. VI. 21. 8–23. 11.

==== Kalinga War and annexation by Maurya Empire (c. 261 – 225 BCE) ====
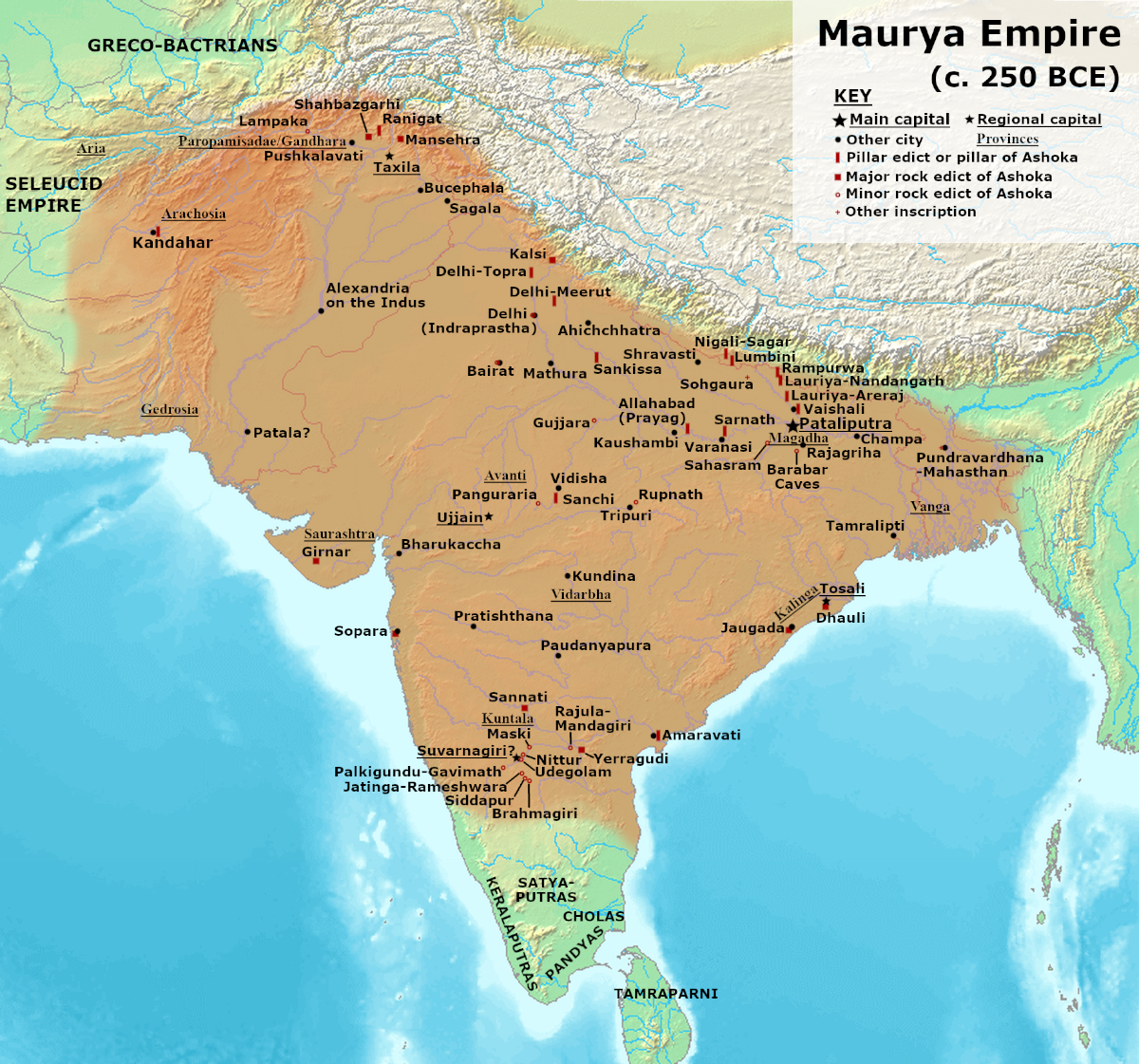
Maurya Empire at Ashoka's regin in 250 BCE

Ashoka invaded Kalinga in 261 BCE and re-annexed into Magadha Empire. After the final battle near the Dhauli hills, the capital Tosali fell to the Mauryas where the headquarters of the Mauryan province of Kalinga was also located. Kalinga broke away from the Mauryan empire during the rule of Dasharatha in 224 BCE.

==== Mahameghavahana Empire (c. 224 BCE – 250 CE) ====
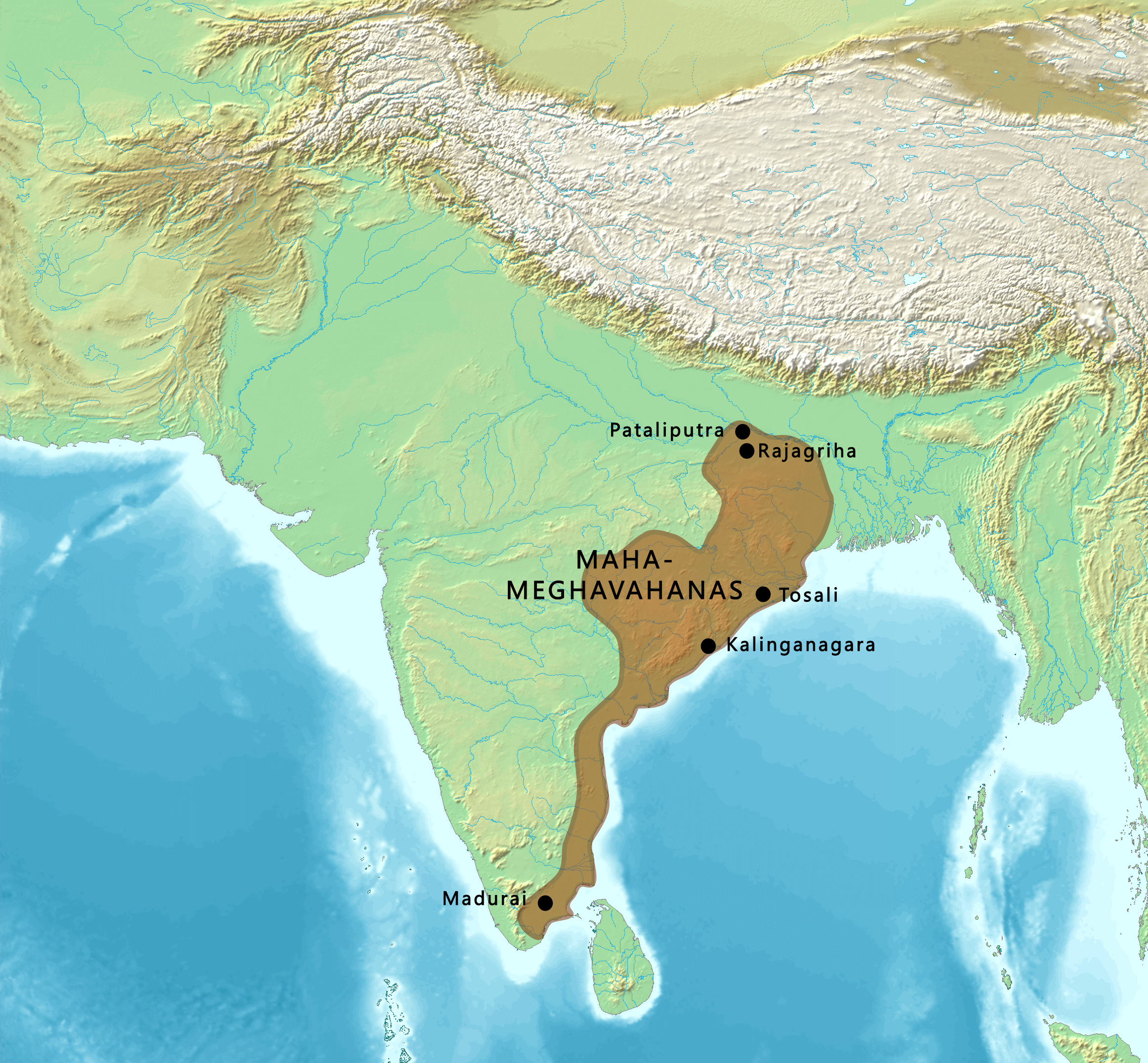
Map of the Maha-Meghavahanas, circa 20 BCE

After the decline of the Mauryan Empire, the region came under the control of the Mahameghavahana family, whose king Kharavela described himself as the "supreme Lord of Kalinga". Kharavela was the greatest ruler of empire who ruled during the second or first century BCE and the primary source for his reign is sourced from the rock-cut Hathigumpha inscription. The inscription describes yearly records of his reign and also credits him with public infrastructure projects, welfare activities, patronage of the arts, and many military victories and also patronising religions such as Jainism while the inscription also describes him as a devotee of all religions.

=== Post-classical Kalinga ===
==== Gupta Empire ====
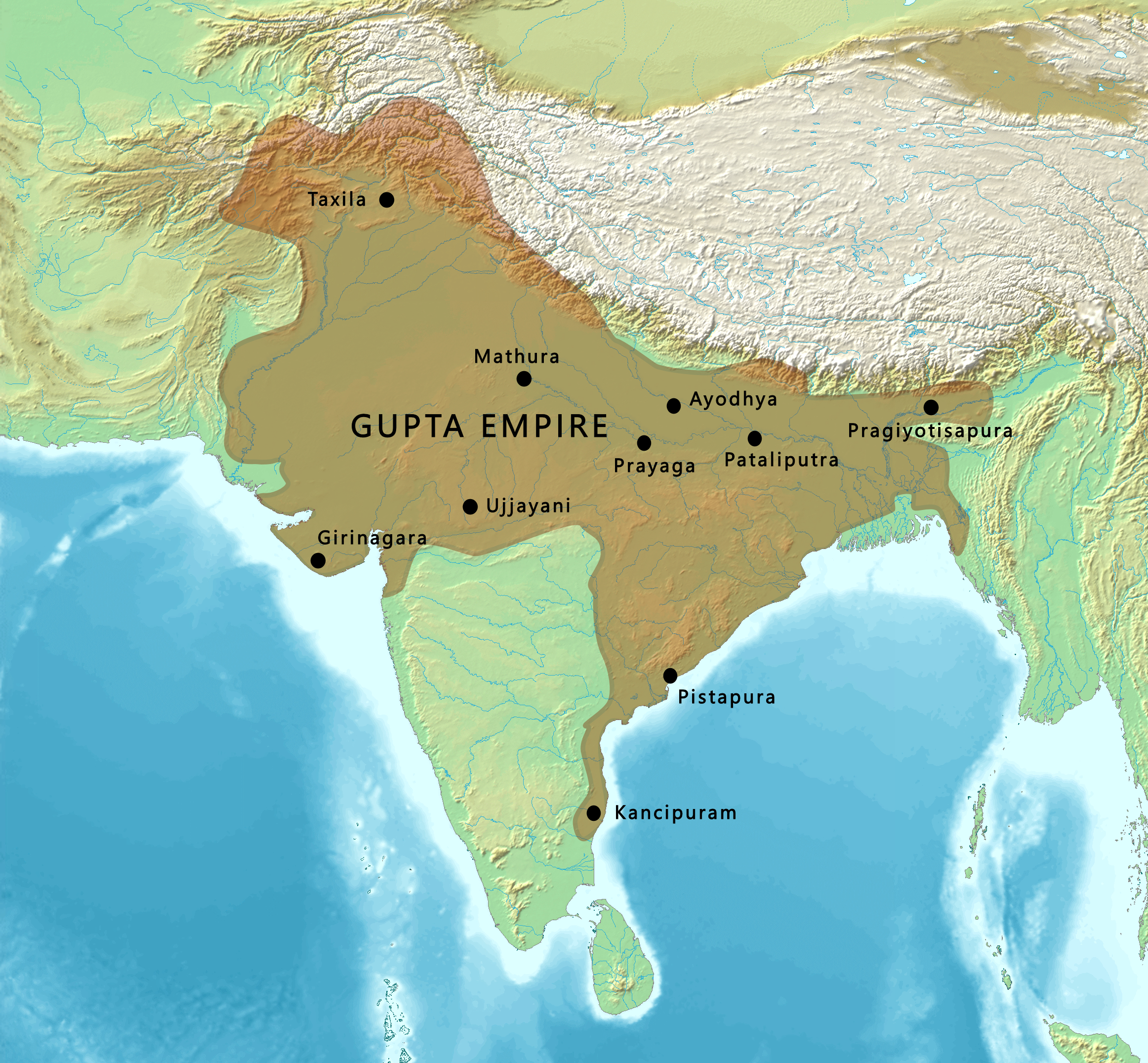
Gupta Empire on its zenith in 350 CE, under Samudragupta

Kalinga came under Gupta suzerainty in the 4th century CE. After the Gupta withdrawal, it was ruled by several minor dynasties, whose rulers bore the title Kalingadhipati ("Lord of Kalinga"). These included the Matharas, Pitrbhaktas, Vasishthas and Nalas. They were followed by the Shailodbhavas and the early Eastern Gangas.

==== Shailodbhava dynasty ====
In the 7th century, the Shailodbhavas ruled parts of eastern India and their core territory was known as Kongoda-mandala, and included parts of the present-day Ganjam, Khordha and Puri districts. King Madhavaraja II claimed the title Sakala-Kalingadhipati ("the lord of the entire Kalinga"). During the 8th–10th centuries, the Bhauma-Kara dynasty ruled the region, although they called their kingdom "Tosala" (derived from Tosali, the ancient capital of Kalinga).

==== Somavamshi or Keshari dynasty ====
The Somavamshis ruled parts of present-day Odisha in eastern India between the 9th and the 12th centuries with their capitals included Yayatinagara and Abhinava-Yayatinagara (modern Jajpur). They ruled the Dakshina Kosala region claiming the title Kosalendra ("lord of Kosala"), following which they conquered the Kalinga and the Utkala regions in present-day Odisha, succeeding the Bhauma-Karas. Thus they called themselves the lord of Kalinga, Kosala, and Utkala. They also introduced a new style of art and architecture in Odisha.

=== Medieval Kalinga ===
==== Eastern Ganga dynasty ====
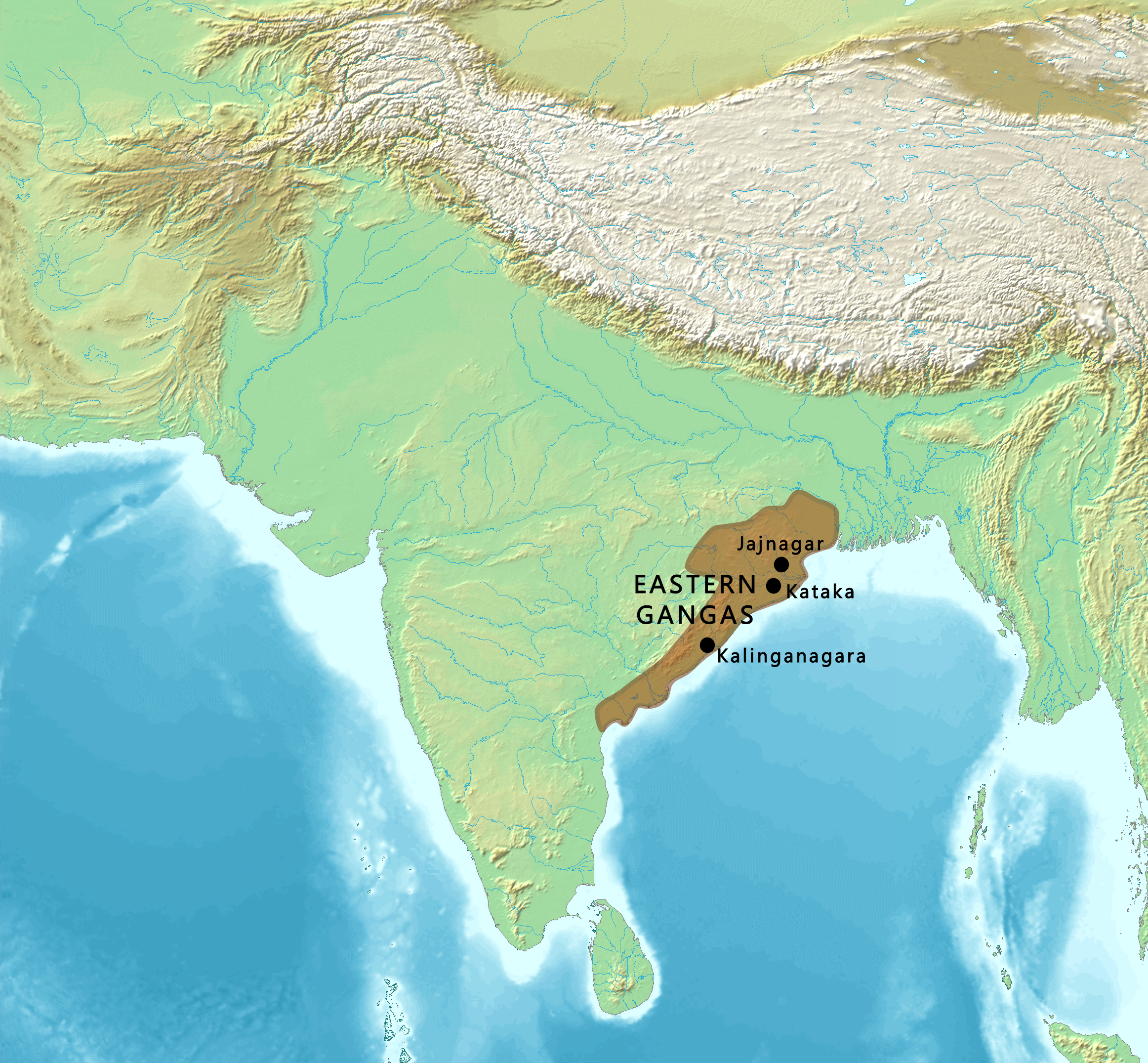
Territorial Extent Of Eastern Gangas

During the 11th–15th century, the Eastern Gangas became the dominant power in the region, and bore the title Kalingadhipati. After succeeding the Somavanshis, they assumed various titles viz. Trikalingadhipathi or Sakala Kalingadhipathi (Lord of three Kalinga or all three Kalingas namely Kalinga proper (South), Utkala (North), and Dakshina Kosala (West)). Their capital was originally located at Kalinganagara (modern Mukhalingam), and was later transferred to Kataka (modern Cuttack) during the reign of Anantavarman Chodaganga in the 12th century. He also built the famous Jagannath Temple at Puri.

Following repeated invasions from the northern regions, Narasimhadeva I, the son of Anangabhima Deva III, invaded southern Bengal in 13th cen., defeated its ruler, captured the capital (Gauda), and built the Sun Temple at Konark to commemorate his victory. Narasimhadeva I was also the first king to use the title of Gajapati or Lord of war elephants or King with an army of elephants among the Odishan kings in the 1246 CE inscription at the Kapilash Temple. With the death of Narasimha in 1264, the Eastern Gangas began to decline and were succeeded by the Suryavamsi Gajapatis in 1434.

==== Gajapati Empire ====
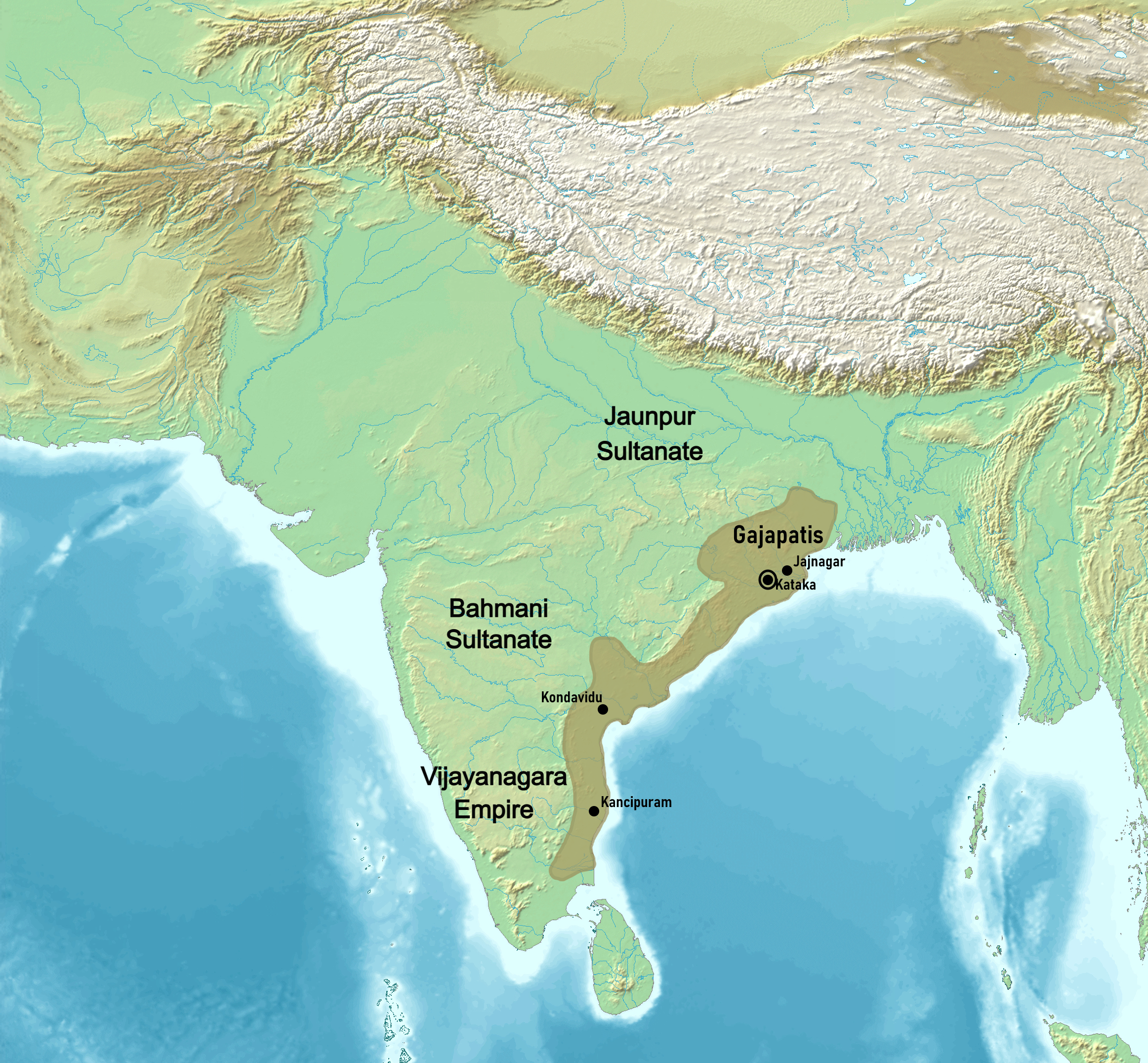
Map of Suryavamsi Gajapatis circa 1450

The last Eastern Ganga ruler Bhanudeva IV was dethroned by Kapilendra Deva in 1435. This event marked the foundation of the Gajapati Empire (Note: Also known as the Routray dynasty) that ruled over the regions of Utkala (North Odisha) and Kalinga (South Odisha, North Andhra Pradesh). Prataparudra Deva was the last great king of the Suryavamsi Gajapatis.

==== Bhoi dynasty ====
After the death of Prataprudra Deva in 1540 his sons Kalua Deva and Khakura Deva were made kings and later assassinated by their minister Govinda Vidyadhara laying the foundation of the Bhoi dynasty. They could only control the Odisha coast, the interior regions fell under the Garhjat Kings.

==== Eastern Chalukya dynasty of Mukunda Deva ====
Mukunda Deva who traced his descent from the Eastern Chalukyas of Vengi rebelled and killed the last two successors of the Bhoi dynasty and declared himself an independent ruler in 1559 on Northern Odisha coast over the Bhoi dynasty's territories but Sulaiman Khan Karrani formed a kingdom in the region of Bengal which proved a potential threat to Mukunda Deva. The fall of the Gajapatis meant the weakening of the centralised authority in the region and the subsequent fragmentation and independence of the tributary and feudal states.

== Influence ==
The merchant Kaundinya I, who became the co-founder of the Funan kingdom (centered in modern Cambodia) after he married the local Nāga princess Soma also has his origins from the ancient Kalinga region.

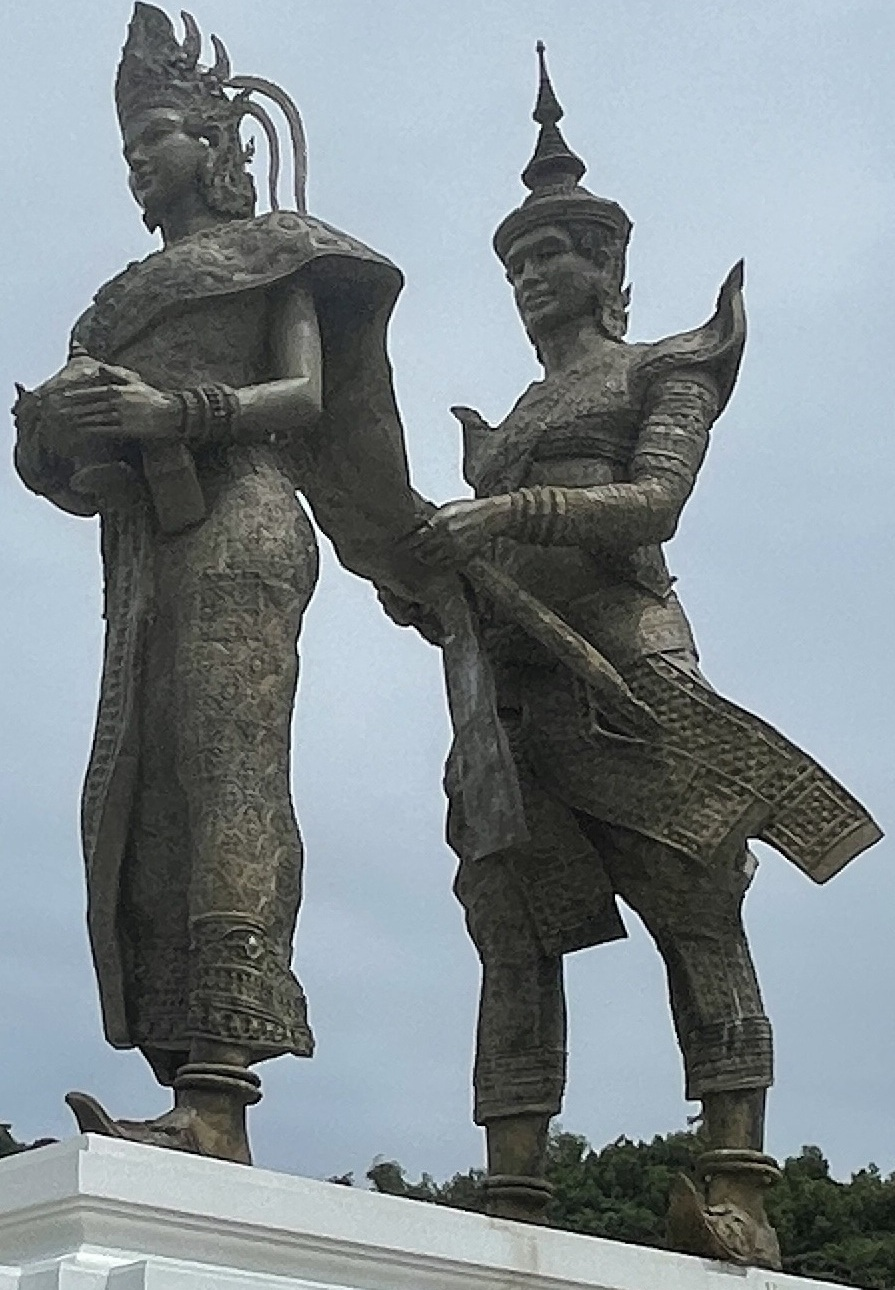
Statue of Kaundinya I and Queen Soma

According to scholar R. C. Majumdar, the 8th century CE Shailendra dynasty of Java likely originated from Kalinga and the dynasty was also powerful in Cambodia and Champa(Annam) region. The Shailendras are considered to have been a thalassocracy and ruled vast swathes of maritime Southeast Asia and the dynasty appeared to be the ruling family of both the Mataram kingdom of Central Java, for some period and the Srivijaya kingdom in Sumatra.

Burma went by the name of Kalinga-rattha (likely observed in the old Indo-Chinese records for Pegu) and there is evidence of very early merchant settlements and Buddhist missions in the southern Mon regions and by the 2nd century CE, the rule of Kalinga migrants centered around Kale, the Arakan River valley and Pegu, around the Gulf of Martaban. The remains of a ship excavated at Tante, near Yangon is thought to have belonged to Kalingan traders. Place names and similarities in architecture also indicate close contacts across the Gulf of Bengal.

As per Maldivian history, the first kingdom Dheeva Maari was established before 3rd century BC by Soorudasaruna-Adeettiya of the Solar dynasty, an exiled prince and son of King Brahmaadittiya of the Kalinga kingdom and laid the foundation of the Adeetta dynasty.

In the Philippines according to Eric Casino, a king of Butuan was called Kiling; Casino posited that the king was not of Visayan origin but was rather of Indian origin, basing solely on the likelihood that the name Kiling was the same as the Malay term Keling (albeit this term is pronounced with a schwa) which refers to Indians.

Derived from Kalinga is the still current term Keling or Kling, used in parts of Southeast Asia to denote a person of the Indian subcontinent or Indian diaspora and at present having some derogatory and pejorative connotations, especially in Malaysia. The 16th-century Portuguese traveller Castanheda wrote of the Keling community in Melaka who lived in the northern part of the city of Malacca(Melaka). The merchants were known as Quelins (Kling, the people of Kalinga from India).

Nissanka Malla, a ruler from Sri Lanka, who ruled the country from 1187 to 1196, mentioned that he was a member of a royal family of Kalinga, born at Sinhapura.

== See also ==
- History of Odisha
- List of rulers of Odisha
- Kalinga script, derived from Brahmi script
- Keling
- Kalingga kingdom
