= Ananda Gotrika =

Ananda Gotrikas, also referred to as Anandas ruled coastal Andhra with Kandarapura as the capital from 335-425 AD. Their capital is located in present day Chejerla mandal of Guntur district. The Ananda Gotrikas ruled after the fall of the Andhra Ikshvakus and claimed descent from the Ananda gotra.

The Anandas appear to have flourished between second half of the 4th century and the first half of the 5th century. There are only three records of the Ananda Gotrikas, which include two copper- plate grants and one stone inscription. Only three kings of the kingdom, Kandara, Attivarman, and Damadoravarman, are known. The founder of the Ananda Gotrikas was Kandara, who also founded the capital city of Kanadarapura. King Kandara also won battles against the Pallavas and drove them out of the Amaravati Region. King Attivarman is one of the three known kings of this dynasty. He performed the costly Hiranyagarbha mahadana (donation) and was a staunch devotee of Lord Shiva. King Damadoravarman was the successor and son of King Attivarman, and Damadoravarman was a Buddhist.

The Ananda Gotrikas appear to have been overthrown by the Salankayanas.
