= Kling =

== Geographical distribution ==
As of 2014, 40.2% of all known bearers of the surname Kling were residents of Germany (frequency 1:6,549), 33.3% of the United States (1:35,616), 7.4% of Sweden (1:4,371), 4.0% of France (1:54,920), 2.8% of Russia (1:168,564), 2.3% of Brazil (1:295,111), 1.6% of the Netherlands (1:35,243) and 1.0% of Argentina (1:136,126).

In Sweden, the frequency of the surname was higher than national average (1:4,371) in the following counties:

1. Kalmar County (1:2,129)
2. Jönköping County (1:2,389)
3. Gävleborg County (1:2,569)
4. Västra Götaland County (1:3,110)
5. Östergötland County (1:3,290)
6. Dalarna County (1:3,331)
7. Örebro County (1:3,478)
8. Värmland County (1:3,963)

In Germany, the frequency of the surname was higher than national average (1:6,549) in the following states:

1. Baden-Württemberg (1:2,661)
2. Hesse (1:3,126)
3. Rhineland-Palatinate (1:4,661)
4. Bavaria (1:4,839)

== People ==
- Anja Kling (born 1970), German actress
- Sigga Kling (born 1967), Icelandic astrologer
- Arnold Kling (born 1954), American economist and blogger
- Catherine Kling (born 1960), American economist
- Florence Kling, maiden name of Florence Harding (1860–1924), wife of US President Warren G. Harding
- Heinrich Kling (1913–1951), German World War II Waffen SS officer
- Johan Kling (born 1962), Swedish film director, screenwriter and novelist
- Johnny Kling (1875–1947), American baseball catcher
- Bill Kling (1867–1934), American baseball pitcher
- Josef Kling (1811–1876), German chess master
- Karl Kling (1910–2003), German motor racing driver and manager
- Måns Nilsson Kling, governor of the 17th century colony of New Sweden
- Marc-Uwe Kling (born 1982), German cabaret artist, author and songwriter
- Ricky Kling (born 1987), Swedish motorcycle speedway rider
- Robert Kling, alias used by Timothy McVeigh (1968–2001), American domestic terrorist
- Robert Kling (born 1997), Norwegian footballer
- Stephan Kling (born 1981), German footballer
- Thomas Kling (1957–2005), German poet
- Vincent Kling (architect) (1916–2013), American architect
- Vincent Kling (translator) (fl. from 1990), American scholar and translator of German literature
- Wilhelm Kling (1902–1973), Communist Party of Germany and Socialist Unity Party functionary
- William Hugh Kling (born 1942), American businessman, created Minnesota Public Radio
- Woody Kling (1925–1998), American television writer and producer

== Other uses ==
- Kling or Keling, a term for Malaysians, Indonesians or Singaporeans of Indian descent
  - Upper Cross Street, Singapore, also known as Kling Street due to Indian traders living in the area
- Kling, a text-to-video model by Kuaishou
- Mount Kling, South Georgia, Atlantic Ocean
- Klings

== See also ==
- Klingons
