= Mathara dynasty =

4th-5th century dynasty of eastern India

- c. 4th century CE–c. 5th century CE
- Find spots and places of issue of the Mathara inscriptions
- Capital: Simhapura
- Religion: Hinduism
- Government: Monarchy
- Historical era: Classical India
  - Established: c. 4th century CE
  - Disestablished: c. 5th century CE
Preceded by	Succeeded by
Gupta Empire	Pitrbhakta dynasty; Vasishtha dynasty

The Mathara (IAST: Māṭhara) dynasty ruled in the Kalinga region of eastern India during 4th and 5th centuries CE. They were one of the few royal families who were ruling Kalinga (others being Vasishtha and Pitrbhakta). Their territory was mainly confined between the southern part of Odisha and the river Godavari River. They appear to have been overthrown by the Pitrbhakta dynasty.

== Genealogy ==
The following members of the Mathara family are known (IAST names in brackets):

- Shankara-varman (Śankaravarman)
- Shakti-varman (Śaktivarman)
- Prabhanjana-varman (Prabhañjanavarman)
- Ananta-shakti-varman (Anantaśaktivarman)

The Mathara kings were devotees of Narayana (Vishnu).

== History ==
The Mathara dynasty ruled Kalinga from the mid-4th century to the end of the 5th century, probably after the forces of the Gupta emperor Samudragupta withdrew from the region. They fought with the Vasisthas and the Pitrbhaktas for the control of Kalinga.

=== Shaktivarman ===
Shaktivarman is the earliest known ruler of the dynasty, and bore the title Kalingadhipati ("Lord of Kalinga"). His father was Shankaravarman, who did not bear any royal title.

A copper-plate inscription of Shaktivarman, dated to his 13th regnal year, gives describes him as Maharajasya-Shri Shaktivarmanah. It was composed by his minister (amatya) Arjunadatta. The inscription was issued at Pishtapura, which is identified with modern Pithapuram. It records the grant of Rakaluva area (modern Ragolu in Srikakulam district) to Brahmanas. The area is described as being located in the Kalinga vishaya (district).

The inscription describes Shaktivarman as the son of Vāsiṣṭhi. According to historian Snigdha Tripathy, this suggests that his mother came from the Vasishtha dynasty. Such matronymics were also used by the earlier dynasties such as the Satavahanas and the Ikshvakus. Pishtapura was originally under the control of the Vasishtha dynasty, and Shaktivarman probably inherited it from his mother. Some scholars believe that Pishtapura was the capital of the Matharas. However, none of Shaktivarman's descendants are known to have issued charters from Pishtapura.

The inscription suggests that Shaktivarman's Kalinga kingdom extended up to the Godavari River in the south. The Simhapura inscription of his son claims that Shaktivarman ruled the region between the Mahanadi and the Kṛṣṇavennā (Krishna) river. This claim seems to be an exaggeration: during 5th and the 6th centuries, the area between the Godavari and the Krishna rivers was controlled by the Shalankayanas and then the Vishnukundinas. Also, there is no evidence that the Matahara rule extended up to the Mahanadi River in the north. The "Mahanadi" mentioned in the inscription seems to be a different river in the present-day Ganjam district; it joins the Rushikulya River near Aska.

=== Prabhanjanavarman ===
Prabhanjanavarman succeeded his father Shaktivarman. His only known inscription was issued from Siṃhapura. The inscription describes him as Sakala-Kalingadhipati ("Lord of the whole of Kalinga").

The inscription records the creation of Ningondi agrahara (Brahmana village). The village was located on the seashore, although its exact location is not certain. The inscription names Jyeshtha as an officer (daṇḍanāyaka) of the king.

=== Anantakshaktivarman ===
Anantashaktivarman succeeded his father Prabhanjanavarman. He bore the title Kalingadhipati ("Lord of Kalinga").

An inscription of the king, dated to his 14th regnal year, has been found. It does not mention its place of issue, but it was presumably issued from Simhapura, which later came under the control of the Pitrbhaktas. The inscription records the grant of Andoreppa village (modern Andhavaram in Srikakulam district) to Brahmanas. It names Mātṛvara as an officer (deśākṣapatalādhikṛta and daṇḍanāyaka) of the king.

Another inscription of the king, now at the Madras Museum, was issued in his 28th regnal year. It names Arjunadatta as a royal officer (deśākṣapatalādhikṛta); he seems to be same as the daṇḍanāyaka mentioned in Shaktivarman's inscription. Arjunadatta's name also appears in the records of the Pitrbhaktas.

Anantashaktivarman appears to have been overthrown by the Pitrbhakta king Umavarman. His officer Mātṛvara later served as the deśākṣapatalādhikṛta of Umavarman in Simhapura. After Anantashaktivarman, Pishtapura seems to have come under the control of the Vasishtha dynasty. The Vasistha king Anantavarman issued an inscription from this city.

== Inscriptions ==
The following copper-plate inscriptions of the Mathara kings are known:

Find spot	Issued by	Issued from	Regnal year	Purpose
Ragolu	Shaktivarman	Pishtapura	13	Grant of Rakaluva village (modern Ragolu)
Unknown	Prabhanjanavarman	Simhapura		Land grant in Ningondi
Andhavaram	Anantashaktivarman		14	Grant of Andoreppa village (modern Andhavaram)
Unknown (currently at Madras Museum)	Anantashaktivarman		28	Grant of Sakunaka village (identity uncertain)

All the records are in Sanskrit language, written in a southern variety of the Brahmi script.
