= Vasishtha dynasty =

5th century dynasty of eastern India

Find spots of the Vasishtha inscriptions

The Vasishtha (IAST: Vāsiṣṭha) dynasty ruled in the Kalinga region of eastern India in the fifth century CE. Their territory included parts of the present-day northern Andhra Pradesh. They were one of the three minor dynasties that emerged after the decline of the Gupta power in the area, the other two being the Matharas and the Pitrbhaktas.

== Genealogy ==
The Vasishtha king Anantavarman is known from his Siripuram and Srungavarapukota copper-plate inscriptions. These epigraphs describe him as a son of Maharaja Prabhanjanavarman, and a grandson of Maharaja Gunavarman.

Thus, three rulers of the dynasty are known:

- Maharaja Gunavarman
- Maharaja Prabhanjanavarman
- Parameshvara Anantavarman

== Territory ==
The Siripuram and Srungavarapukota inscriptions of Anantavarman were issued from Devapura and Pishtapura respectively. In Siripuram inscription, his grandfather Gunavarman is described as the lord of Devapura. The city was presumably the capital of a region called Devarashtra (within Kalinga), which Anantavarman inherited from his ancestors. Devarashtra is identified as the present-day Yelamanchili taluka.

According to the Allahabad Pillar inscription, the Gupta emperor Samudragupta defeated the kings of Devarashtra and Pishtapura during his southern invasion. It appears that Gunavarman became a sovereign of Devarashtra after the decline of the Gupta rule in the region.

== Religion ==
Unlike the Vaishnavite Matharas, Anantavarman was a Shaivite. His inscriptions describe him as parama-maheshvara (devotee of Shiva).

== Inscriptions ==
The following copper-plate inscriptions of the Vasishtha kings are known:

Find spot	Issued by	Issued from	Purpose
Siripuram, Srikakulam	Anantavarman	Devapura	Grant of village Tontapara (possibly modern Totada)
Srungavarapukota	Anantavarman	Pishtapura	Grant of the village Kindeppa

All the records are in Sanskrit language, written in a southern variety of the Brahmi script.
