= Mount Kling =

Mountain in South Georgia

Mount Kling (54°30′S 36°18′W) is a mountain, 1,845 m, between Nordenskjold Peak and Mount Brooker in the Allardyce Range of South Georgia. It was surveyed by the South Georgia Survey in the period 1951–57, and named by the United Kingdom Antarctic Place-Names Committee (UK-APC) for Alfred Kling, navigator of the Deutschland during the German Antarctic Expedition, 1911–12, under Filchner. The first ascent was made on 21 January 1990 by Julian Freeman-Attwood and Lindsay Griffin, members of the Southern Ocean Mountaineering Expedition.
