= Siripuram, Vizianagaram district =

Siripuram
- Village
- Interactive map of Siripuram
- Location in Andhra Pradesh, India Siripuram (India)
- Coordinates: 18°23′N 83°47′E
- Country: India
- State: Andhra Pradesh
- District: Vizianagaram
- Talukas: Santhakavati

Languages
  - Official: Telugu
- Time zone: UTC+5:30 (IST)
- Vehicle registration: AP

Siripuram, Vizianagaram District is a village and gram panchayat located in Santhakaviti Mandal in Andhra Pradesh, India. According to Panchayat Raj act, Siripuram is administrated by Sarpanch, an elected representative of the village.

== Demographics ==
The total population of the village is 5,206 of which are 2731 males and are 2475 females.
