= Pariśiṣṭa =

Pariśiṣṭa (Devanagari: परिशिष्ट, "supplement, appendix, remainder") are Sanskrit supplementary texts appended to another fixed, more ancient text – typically the Vedic literature – that aim to "tell what remains to be told". These have style of sutras, but less concise. According to Max Mueller, the parisista of the Vedas, "may be considered the very last outskirts of Vedic literature, but they are Vedic in character, and it would be difficult to account for their origin at any time except the expiring moments of the Vedic age."

Within the early Sanskrit texts, 18 parisishtas are mentioned, but numerous more have survived into the modern era, likely composed later. Parisista exists for each of the four Vedas. However, only the literature associated with the Atharvaveda is extensive and 74 parisishtas are known, some in the form of dialogues. The Vedic parisistas generally present rituals, ceremonies, nature of hymns, and opinions of other scholars about certain aspects of the primary text. The Atharvaveda parisishtas include omens in addition, and sections of it have survived in very corrupted form that is difficult to elucidate or interpret.

== Rigveda ==
The Āśvalāyana Gṛhya Pariśiṣṭa is a very late text associated with the Rigveda canon. It is a short text of three chapters expanding on domestic rites such as the daily sandhyopāsana and rites of passage such as marriage and śrāddha.

The Bahvricha parisishta and Sankayana parisishta are also attached to the Rigveda.

== Samaveda ==
The Gobhila Gṛhya Pariśiṣṭa, ascribed to Gobhilaputra, is a concise metrical text of two chapters, with 113 and 95 verses respectively. Its subjects are covered in a manner clear to those who understand Vedic Sanskrit. The first chapter deals with physical aspects of sacred cosmic rituals e.g. names of the 37 types of sacred fires, the rules and measurements for the firewood, preparation of the holy site and the timings of each cosmic activity. The second chapter deals mainly with major domestic rites such as matrimony or Shrāddha (communication with ancestral beings). Noteworthy are injunctions such as that a girl should be given away in marriage before she attains puberty.

A second short text, the Chāndogya Pariśiṣṭa has roughly similar coverage.

== Yajurveda ==
=== Śukla (White) ===
The Kātiya Pariśiṣṭas, ascribed to Kātyāyana, consist of 18 works enumerated self-referentially in the fifth of the series (the Caraṇavyūha): Six other works of parisista character are also traditionally ascribed to Kātyāyana, including a work of identical name (Pratijña) but different contents. How many of these 24 are actually due to Kātyāyana is dubious; in all probability, they were composed by different authors at different times, with the Pratijña and the Caraṇavyūha being among the latest as they mention the others.

Scope	Books
Form and language of the Saṃhitā	Pratijña I(3), Anuvākasaṃkhya(4), Caraṇavyūha(5), Ṛgyajuṣa(8), Pārṣada(9), Pratijña II, Sarvānukrama, Yājñavalkyaśikṣā
Śrauta rituals	Yūpalakṣaṇa(1), Chāgalakṣaṇa(2), Śulba(7), Iṣṭakāpūraṇa(10), Pravarādhyāya(11), Mūlyādhyāya(12), Hautrika(16), Kūrmalakṣaṇa(18), Kratusaṁkhyā
Śrauta and Gṛhya	Nigama(14), Yajñapārśva(15), Mantrabhrāntihara Sūtra
Gṛhya rituals	Śrāddhasūtra(6), Uñchaśāstra{13), Śuklayajurvidhāna
Dharmaśāstra	Prasavotthāna(17)

=== Kṛṣṇa (Black) ===
The Kṛṣṇa Yajurveda has 3 parisistas:

- The Āpastamba Hautra Pariśiṣṭa, which is also found as the second praśna of the Satyasāḍha Śrauta Sūtra, specifies the duties of the Hotṛ priest in haviryajñas other than the darśapūrṇmāsa (New and Full Moon sacrifice).
- The Vārāha Śrauta Sūtra Pariśiṣṭa.
- The Kātyāyana Śrauta Sūtra Pariśiṣṭa.

== Atharvaveda ==
For the Atharvaveda, there are 79 works, collected as 72 distinctly named parisistas.

Book	Coverage
1	Lore of the constellations
2-19	Royal ceremonies
20-33	Ritual
34-36	Magic
37-40	Ritual
41-44	Religious observances
45-46	Ritual
47-48	Phonetics and Lexicography
49	Vedic conspectus (the Caraṇavyūha)
50-72	Omens
