= Matsya Purana =

Sanskrit Hindu scripture, one of eighteen major Puranas

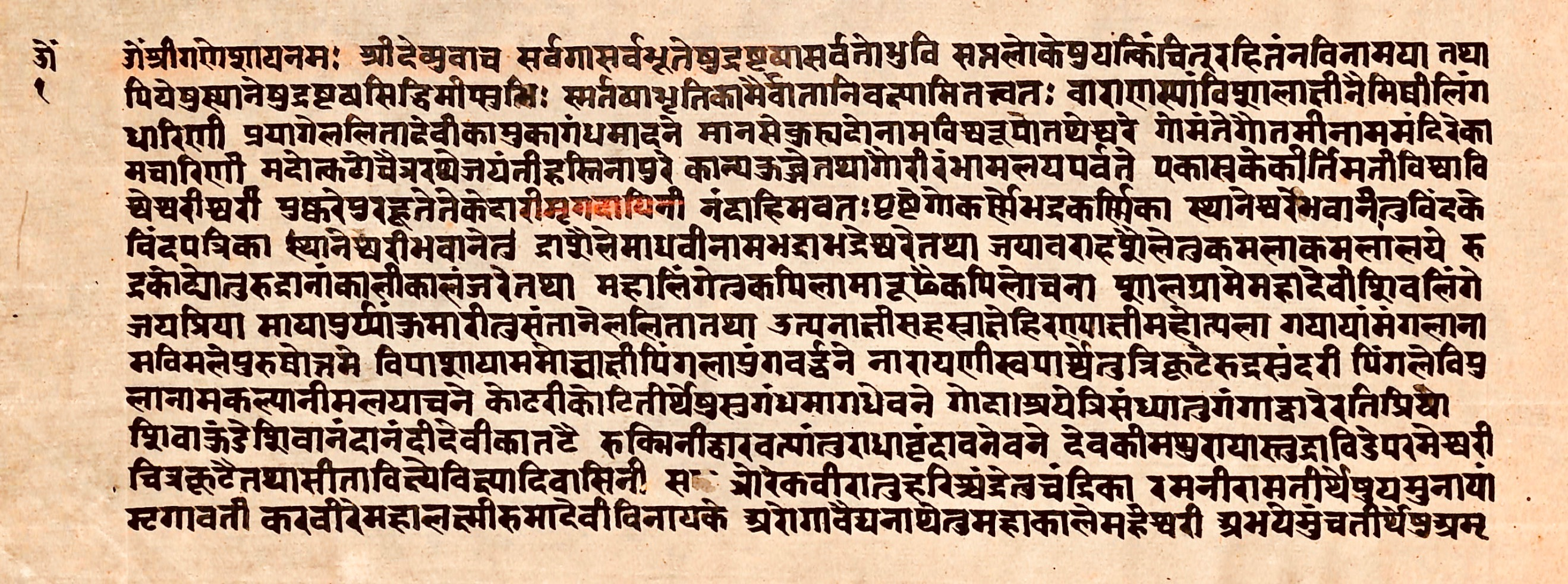
The opening page of chapters 13–14, Matsya Purana (Sanskrit, Devanagari).

The Matsya Purana (IAST: Matsya Purāṇa) is one of the eighteen major Puranas (Mahapurana), and among the oldest and better preserved in the Puranic genre of Sanskrit literature in Hinduism. The text is a Vaishnavism text named after the half-human and half-fish avatar of Vishnu. However, the text has been called by the 19th-century Sanskrit scholar Horace Hayman Wilson, "although a Shaivism (Shiva-related) work, it is not exclusively so"; the text has also been referred to one that simultaneously praises various Hindu gods and goddesses.

The Matsya Purana has survived into the modern era in many versions, varying in the details but almost all of the published versions have 291 chapters, except the Tamil language version, written in Grantha script, which has 172 chapters.

The text is notable for providing one of earliest known definition of a Purana genre of literature. A history written with five characteristics is called a Purana, states Matsya Purana, otherwise it is called Akhyana. These five characteristics are cosmogony describing its theory of primary creation of the universe, chronological description of secondary creations wherein the universe goes through the cycle of birth-life-death, genealogy and mythology of gods and goddesses, Manvantaras, legends of kings and people including solar and lunar dynasties.

The Matsya Purana is also notable for being encyclopedic in the topics it covers. Along with the five topics the text defines a Purana to be, it includes mythology, a guide for building art work such as paintings and sculpture, features and design guidelines for temples, objects and house architecture (Vastu-shastra), various types of Yoga, duties and ethics (Dharma) with multiple chapters on the value of Dāna (charity), both Shiva and Vishnu related festivals, geography particularly around the Narmada river, pilgrimage, duties of a king and good government and other topics.

== Date ==
The Matsya Purana, like all Puranas, was revised and updated continuously. The composition of the text may have begun in the last centuries of the 1st-millennium BCE, and its first version complete by about the 3rd-century of the common era, asserts Ramachandra Dikshitar. Other scholars, such as Pandurang Vaman Kane, place the earliest version of the text to between c. 200 and 500 CE. The Matsya Purana, in chapter 53, includes a note stating that as a Purana, it is supposed to be edited and revised to remain useful to the society.

Wendy Doniger dates the Matsya Purana to have been composed between 250 and 500 CE. The general consensus among scholars is that Matsya Purana is among the older Purana, with its first version complete in the 3rd-century CE, but sections of it were routinely revised, deleted and expanded over the centuries, through the 2nd-millennium CE.

The Matsya Purana, like all Puranas, has a complicated chronology. Dimmitt and van Buitenen state that each of the Puranas is encyclopedic in style, and it is difficult to ascertain when, where, why and by whom these were written:

As they exist today, the Puranas are a stratified literature. Each titled work consists of material that has grown by numerous accretions in successive historical eras. Thus no Purana has a single date of composition. (...) It is as if they were libraries to which new volumes have been continuously added, not necessarily at the end of the shelf, but randomly.

— Cornelia Dimmitt and J.A.B. van Buitenen, Classical Hindu Mythology: A Reader in the Sanskrit Puranas

== Name and structure ==
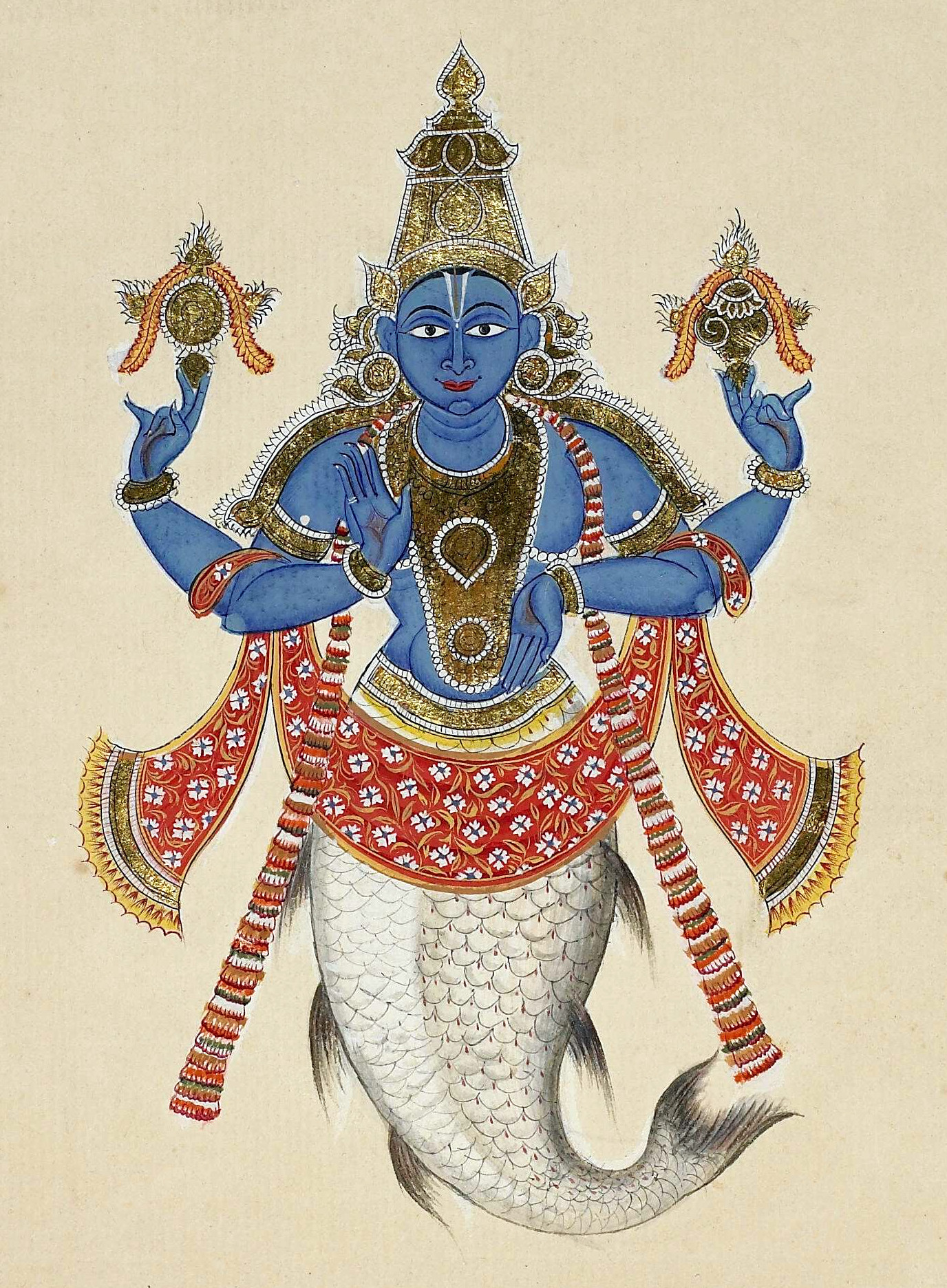
Vishnu's fish avatar Matsya

The text is named after the fish avatar of the Hindu god Vishnu called Matsya.

The Tamil version of the Matsya Purana has two sections, Purva (early) and Uttara (later), and it consists of 172 chapters. Other versions of the published Matsya Purana manuscripts have 291 chapters.

The text and tradition asserts that Matsya Purana had 20,000 verses. However, extant manuscripts contain between 13,000 and 15,000 verses.

The Padma Purana categorizes Matsya Purana as a Tamas Purana, or one that glorifies Shiva or Agni. Scholars consider the Sattva-Rajas-Tamas classification as "entirely fanciful" and there is nothing in this text that actually justifies this classification.

== Contents ==
It narrates the story of Matsya, the first of ten major Avatars of the Hindu god Vishnu. The text describes the mythology of a great flood, where in the world and humans led by Manu, the seeds of all plants and mobile living beings, as well as its knowledge books (Vedas) were saved by the Matsya avatar of Vishnu.

The Matsya Purana covers a diverse range of topics, many unrelated to Vishnu, and its mixed encyclopedic character led Horace Hayman Wilson – famous for his 19th-century Purana studies and translations, to state, "it is too mixed a character to be considered a genuine Purana" and largely a collection of miscellaneous topics. The text includes a similar coverage on legends of god Shiva and god Vishnu, and dedicates a section on goddess Shakti as well. Chapters 54-102 of the text discuss the significance and celebration of Hindu festivals and family celebrations such as those related to the Samskara (rite of passage). The chapters 215–227 of the text discuss its theories of the duties of a king and good government, while chapters 252–257 weave in a technical discussion of how to identify a stable soil for home construction, different architectural designs of a house along with construction-related ritual ceremonies.

=== Temple design ===
The Matsya Purana, along with the texts such as Brihat Samhita, are among the oldest surviving texts with numerous sections on temple, sculpture and artwork designs. The Purana describes 20 styles of Hindu temples, such as Meru, Mandara (later Mandir) and Kailasa designs. The text lays out guidelines on foundation, spaces within the core temple where people visit, and then the spire (Vimana or Shikhara).

The text asserts square grid as ideal for a Hindu temple, discussing 8x8 squares grid mainly, but smaller 3x3 floor plan as well (above). The Matsya Purana in other chapters presents its theories on layout of towns and public works such as water reservoirs.

The text highlights the square design principle, suggesting that the land and design of large temples be set on 64 squares (mandala or yantra), and numerous other square grid designs such as the 16 square grid smaller temple. A temple's main entrance and the sanctum space should typically open east facing the sunrise, states the text, while the human body was the template of the temple, with Atman and Brahman (Purusha) as the resider in the heart, respectively. The relative ratios, of various levels and various spaces, which the text asserts are naturally pleasing, such as those of entrance height, lengths and heights, placement of carvings are specified in chapters 253–269, as well as other sections such as chapters 58–65. For example, the text suggests that the pillar inside the temple (stambha) be considered as of nine parts, with terms such as Padma, Kumbha, Antara and others, wherein the width of the pillar and each of these parts have certain ratios, and the structural features or carvings be laid out on these nine parts. The text, though named after an avatar of Vishnu, has numerous sections on the installation of Shiva Linga, while other chapters mention Vishnu murti, goddesses and other deities.

The design guidebooks embedded inside the Matsya Purana were likely suggestions, and not binding on those who sponsored or built the temples, states Michael Meister. However, field evidence suggests that the 1st-millennium Hindu temples across India, ones that have survived into the modern age, did adopt the square principle and the architecture approximately follows the general principles mention in old texts such as the Matsya Purana.

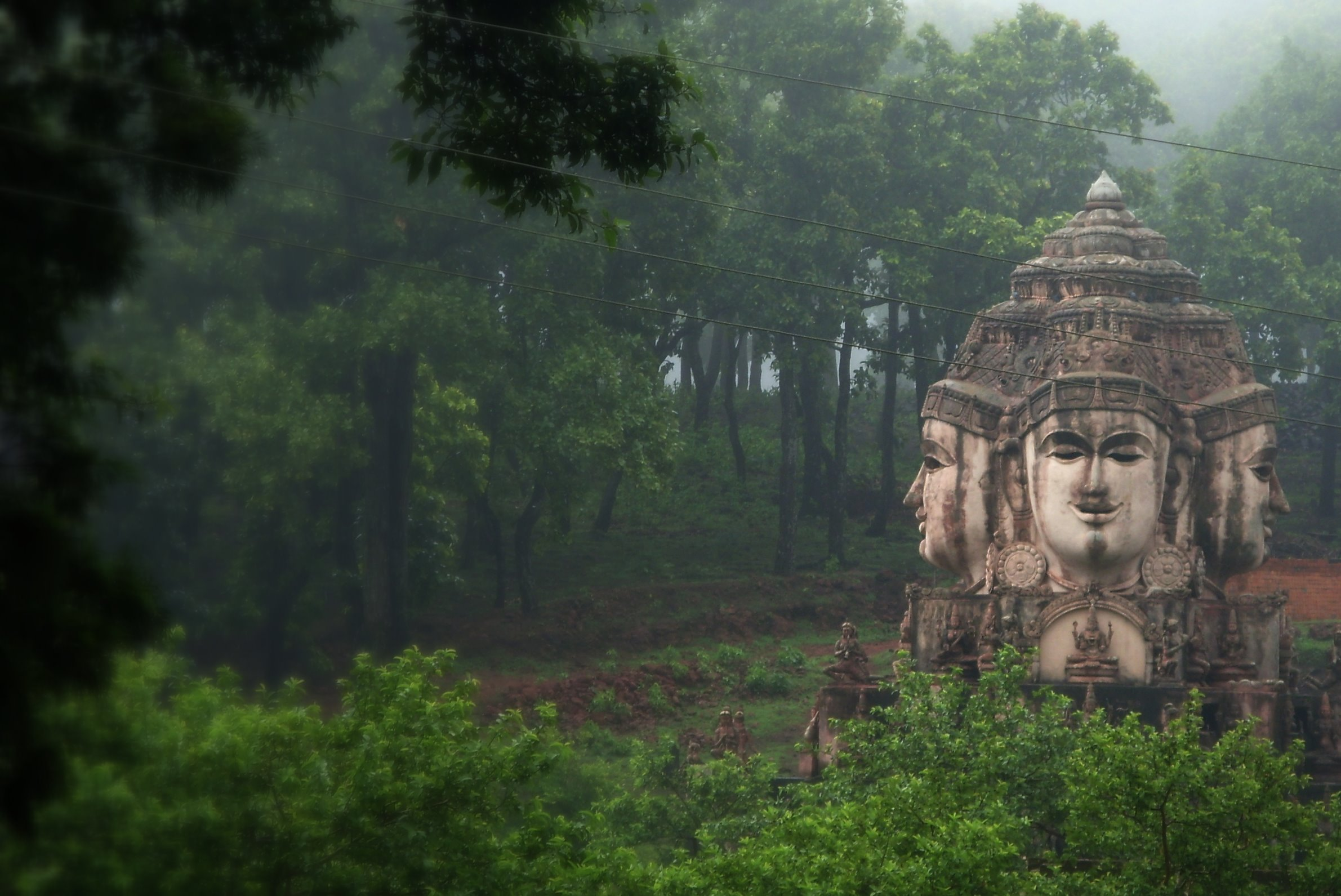
The Matsya Purana mentions many Amarkantaka temples, located near the source of the Narmada river in eastern Madhya Pradesh.

=== Tourist guides ===
The Matsya Purana contains, like all Puranas, a collection of chapters called the Mahatmya. These, states Ariel Glucklich, were ancient or medieval Indian "promotional works aimed at tourists from that era".

The most detailed set, in chapters 189–194 of the Matsya Purana, is about sights, history and temples along the Narmada river region in modern Madhya Pradesh, Maharashtra and Gujarat. The Prayaga Mahatmya is another tour guide in the text, which covers chapters 103–112 of the Matsya Purana, with verses on the Kumbh mela.

Other Tirtha (pilgrimage) areas covered in the tour guide sections of this Purana, include those related to Goddesses (Shakti) in eastern and southern states of India. The chapters 180-185 of the text present Avimukta Mahatmya, which is a travel guide for Benaras (Varanasi, Kashi).

=== Significance of ecology ===
Matsya Purana has a shloka (hymn), which explains the importance of reverence of ecology in Hinduism. It states, "A pond equals ten wells, a reservoir equals ten ponds, while a son equals ten reservoirs, and a tree equals ten sons."

=== Yoga and worship ===
The text presents Yoga in many early and late chapters, with the description varying. In chapter 52, for example, the Matsya Purana states that Karma Yoga is more important than Jnana Yoga to a new Yogi, because Karma Yoga leads to Jnana Yoga, and Jnana Yoga never arises without Karma Yoga. The text then describes eight essential spiritual qualities of a Karma Yogi in verse 52.8–52.10 – Clemency and non-injury to others and all living beings, forbearance, protection to those who seek aid in distress, freedom from envy, external and internal purification, calmness, non-miserliness in helping those who are distressed, and never hankering after another person's wealth or wife.

Karma Yogi, asserts the text in verse 52.13–52.14, undertakes five worships every day – worship the Devas, worship one's parents and ancestors, feeding the poor and showing hospitality to guests, feeding animals and birds, and worship sages and one's teachers by reciting the Vedas. Elsewhere, the Matsya Purana, in chapter 183, states that Yoga is of two forms – Saguna yoga and Nirguna yoga.

== See also ==
- Bhagavata Purana
- Itihasa-Purana
- Matsya Kingdom
- Vishnu Purana
- Upanishads
