= Linga Purana =

Historical Sanskrit text

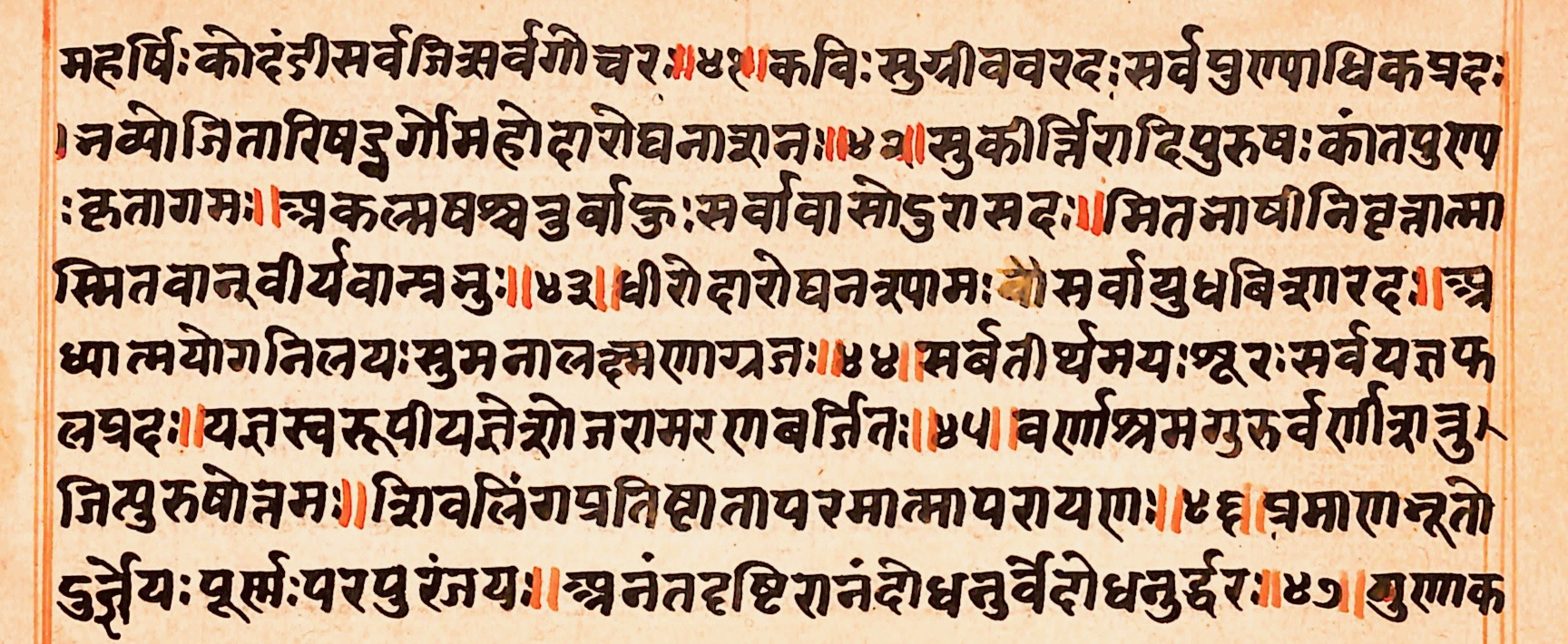
A page from a Linga Purana manuscript (Sanskrit, Devanagari)

The Linga Purana (लिङ्गपुराण, IAST: Liṅga-purāṇa) is one of the eighteen Mahapuranas, and a Shaivism text of Hinduism. The text's title Linga refers to the iconographical symbol for Shiva.

The author(s) and date of the Linga Purana are unknown, and estimates place the original text to have been composed between the 5th-10th century CE. The text exists in many versions and was likely revised over time and expanded. The extant text is structured into two parts, with a cumulative total of 163 chapters.

The text presents cosmology, mythology, seasons, festivals, geography, a tour guide for pilgrimage (Tirtha), a manual for the design and consecration of the Linga and Nandi, stotras, the importance of these icons, a description of Yoga with claims of its various benefits.

== Date and structure ==
The estimated composition dates for the oldest core of Linga Purana vary among scholars, ranging from the 5th-century CE to the 10th-century.

Like all the Puranas, the Linga Purana has a complicated chronology. Cornelia Dimmitt and J. A. B. van Buitenen state that each of the Puranas is encyclopedic in style, and it is difficult to ascertain when, where, why, and by whom these were written:

"As they exist today, the Puranas are a stratified literature. Each titled work consists of material that has grown by numerous accretions in successive historical eras. Thus no Purana has a single date of composition. (...) It is as if they were libraries to which new volumes have been continuously added, not necessarily at the end of the shelf, but randomly.

— Cornelia Dimmitt and J. A. B. van Buitenen, Classical Hindu Mythology: A Reader in the Sanskrit Puranas

The Linga Purana survives in many versions, consisting of two parts – the Purva-bhaga (older part, sometimes called Purvardha) with 108 chapters and Uttara-bhaga (later part, sometimes called Uttarardha) with 55 chapters. However, the manuscripts of the text assert in verse 2.55.37 that the Uttara-bhaga only has 46 chapters, suggesting that the text was expanded over time. Some scholars suggest that the entire Uttara-bhaga may be a later insertion or attachment to the older part.

The text is titled after its theme, which is the worship of Linga, and the text is primarily focused on Shiva as Supreme. However, along with Shiva-related themes, the Linga Purana includes chapters dedicated to Vedic themes, as well as includes reverence for Vishnu and Brahma.

== Contents ==
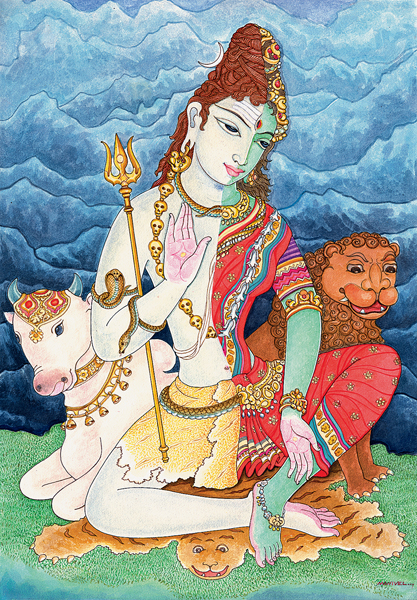
The Linga Purana discusses the idea of Ardhanarishvara (above), asserting that the goddess is the mother of the universe and she is the avatar of the god. God and goddess, linga and yoni, are co-creators of the universe, both centers of power and divine splendor, states the text.

Linga, states Alain Daniélou, means sign. It is an important concept in Hindu texts, wherein Linga is a manifested sign and nature of someone or something. It accompanies the concept of Brahman, which as invisible signless and existent Principle, is formless or linga-less. The Linga Purana states, "Shiva is signless, without color, taste, smell, that is beyond word or touch, without quality, motionless and changeless". The source of the universe is signless, and all of the universe is the manifested Linga, a union of unchanging Principles and the ever-changing nature. The Linga Purana text builds on this foundation.

The Linga Purana consists of two parts – the longer Purva-bhaga and the shorter Uttara-bhaga. They discuss diverse range of topics, and illustrative sections include:

- Cosmology: the text presents cosmology in several places. For example, in early chapters it refers to the Shvetashvatara Upanishad, and in chapter 1.70 it presents a Samkhya-type cosmology.
- Astronomy: the Purana presents its theory of sun, moon, planets and stars in the night sky in chapters 1.55 to 1.61, with the mythology associated with each.
- Geography: the earth has seven continents asserts the text, and it then names and describes the mountains and rivers, what grows in various regions, the text is woven in with mythology.
- Tirtha (pilgrimage): the holy cities of Varanasi, Kedarnath, Prayag and Kurukshetra are extolled in chapters 1.77 and 1.92, for example.
- Yoga and ethics: the Linga Purana discusses Pashupata Yoga and ethics in many sections, such as chapters 1.8, 1.88-1.89, 2.13, 2.55 and others.

Ethics in Linga Purana

Giving help to everyone,
showing kindness to all,
is called the highest worship
of the Lord of eight forms.

— Linga Purana 2.13.35-36
Transl: Stella Kramrisch

The Linga Purana is notable for its aggressiveness in retaliating against those who censure Shiva, suggesting in chapter 1.107 that Shiva devotee should be willing to give his life to end the censorship of Shiva, if necessary with violence against those who censure Shiva. In Chapter 1.78, the text also emphasizes the virtues of non-violence, stating, "violence should be avoided always, and at all places."

The Linga Purana's ideas incorporate, states Stella Kramrisch, those of the Samkhya school of Hindu philosophy. The chapter 1.17 of the Linga Purana introduces Linga as Pradhana or Prakriti (cosmic substance), while Shiva is described as Lingin, or one with this "subtle body". Lingam is presented by the text as an abstract concept, the formless reality, contrasted with Alinga (Vyakta), along with its phallic significance with the sexual truth in nature's process of life creation in the universe. The verses of the text, states Kramrisch, present Linga as an aniconic symbol of both the matter and the spirit, the Prakriti and the Purusha, whereby the "powers of creation, liberation, and annihilation" are symbolized by the icon.
