= North Andhra =

North Andhra Uttara Āndhra, Kaḷiṅga Āndhra Vizag Region
- Geographic region of Andhra Pradesh
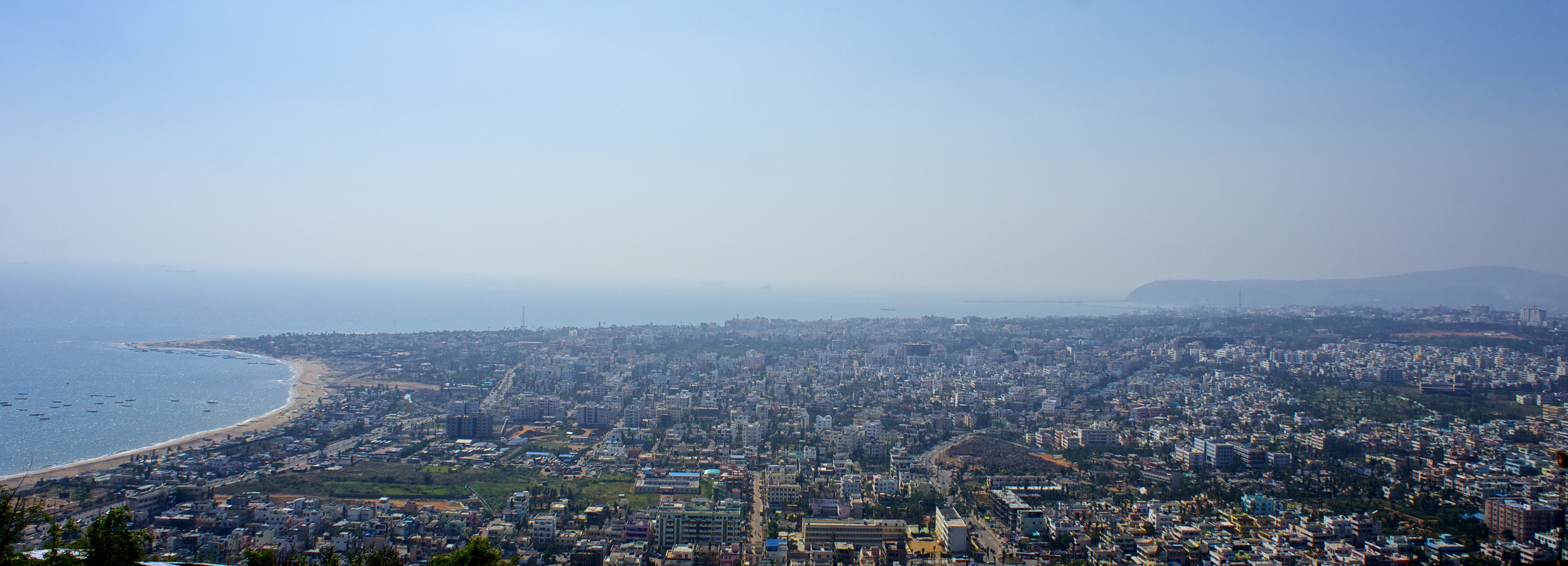
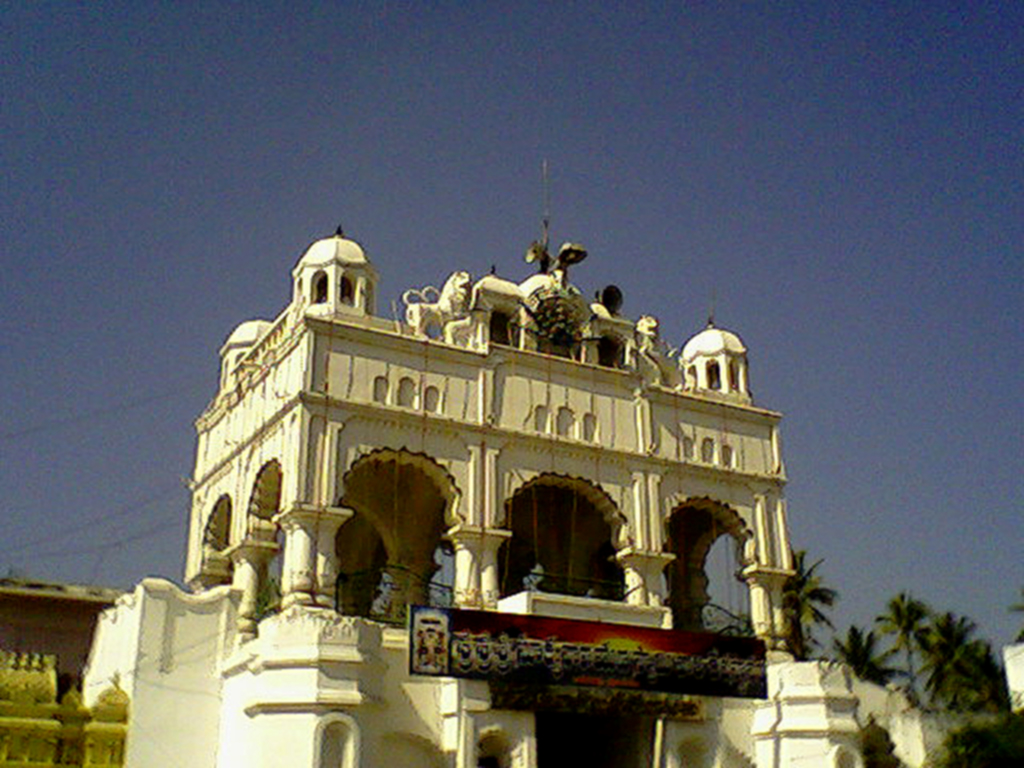
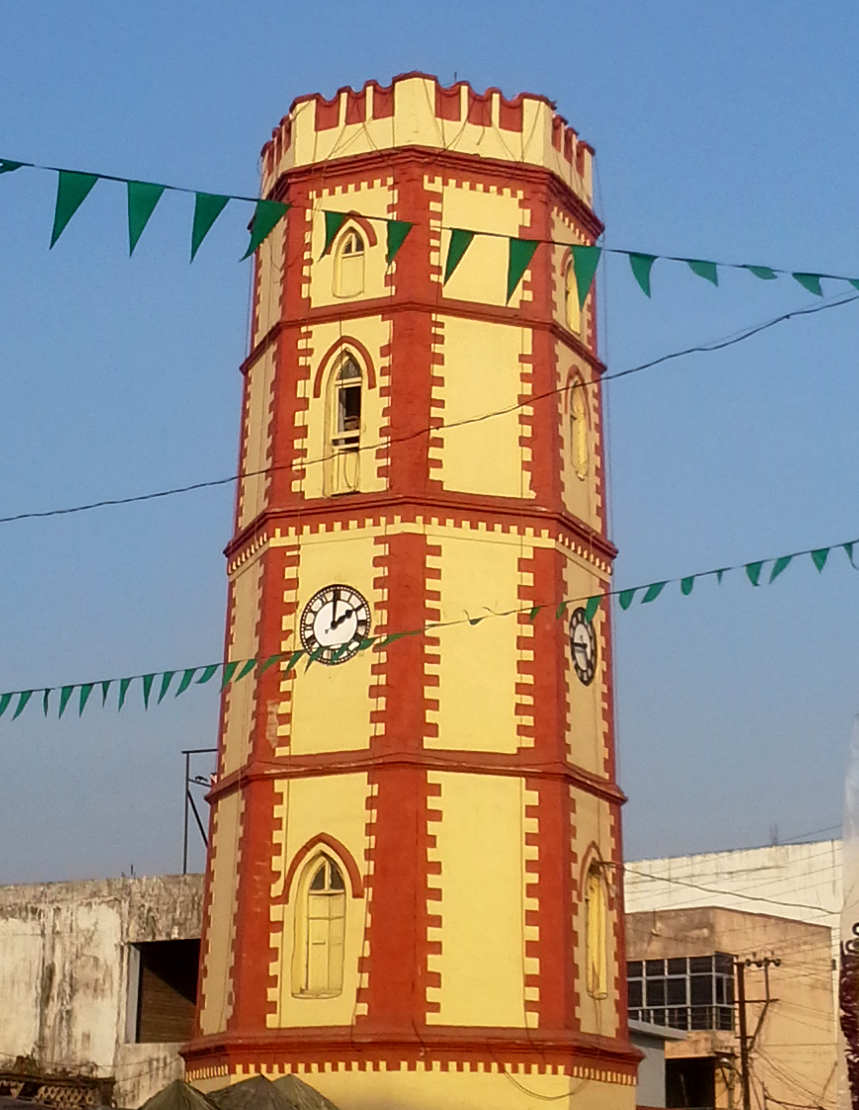
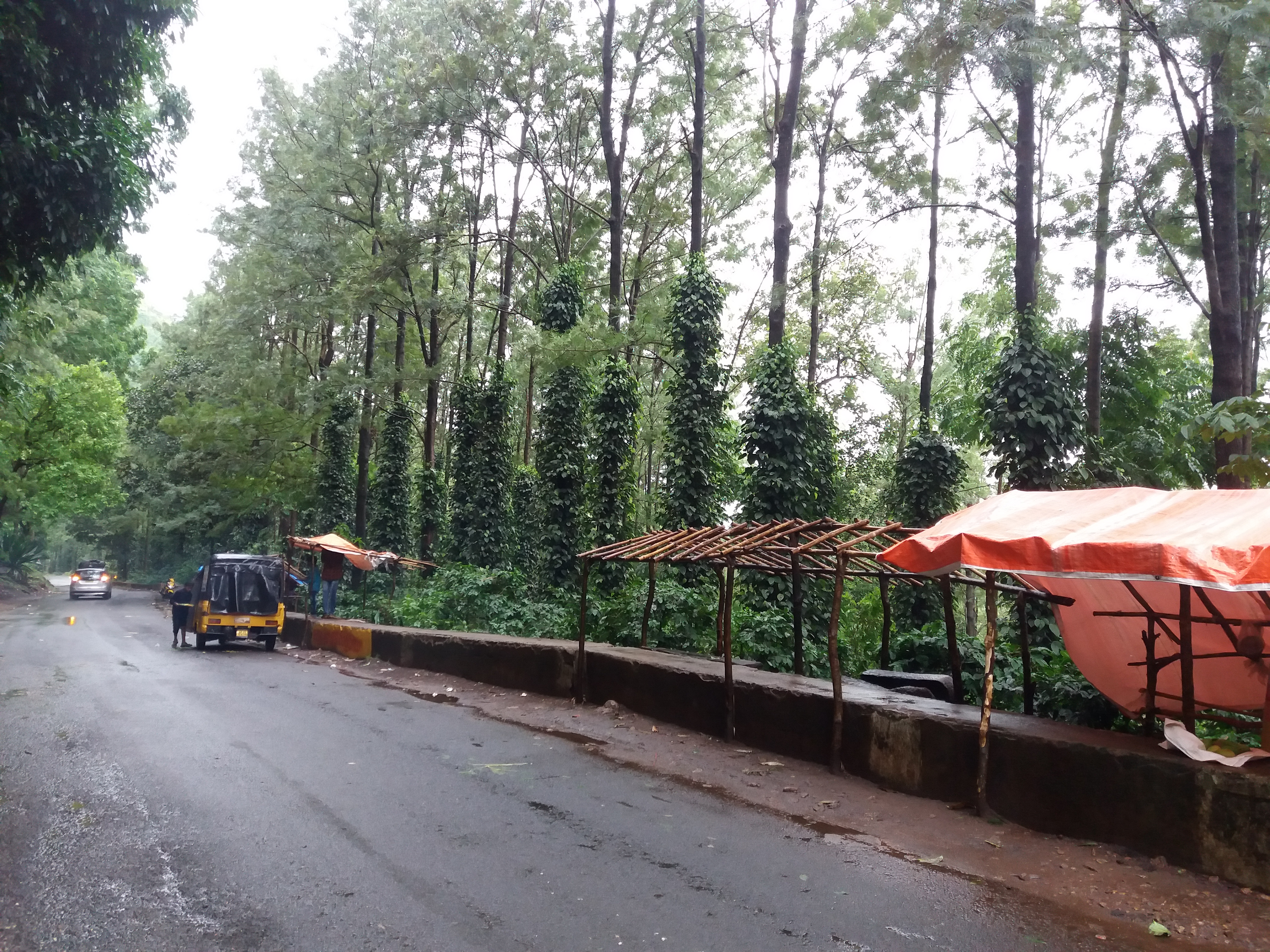
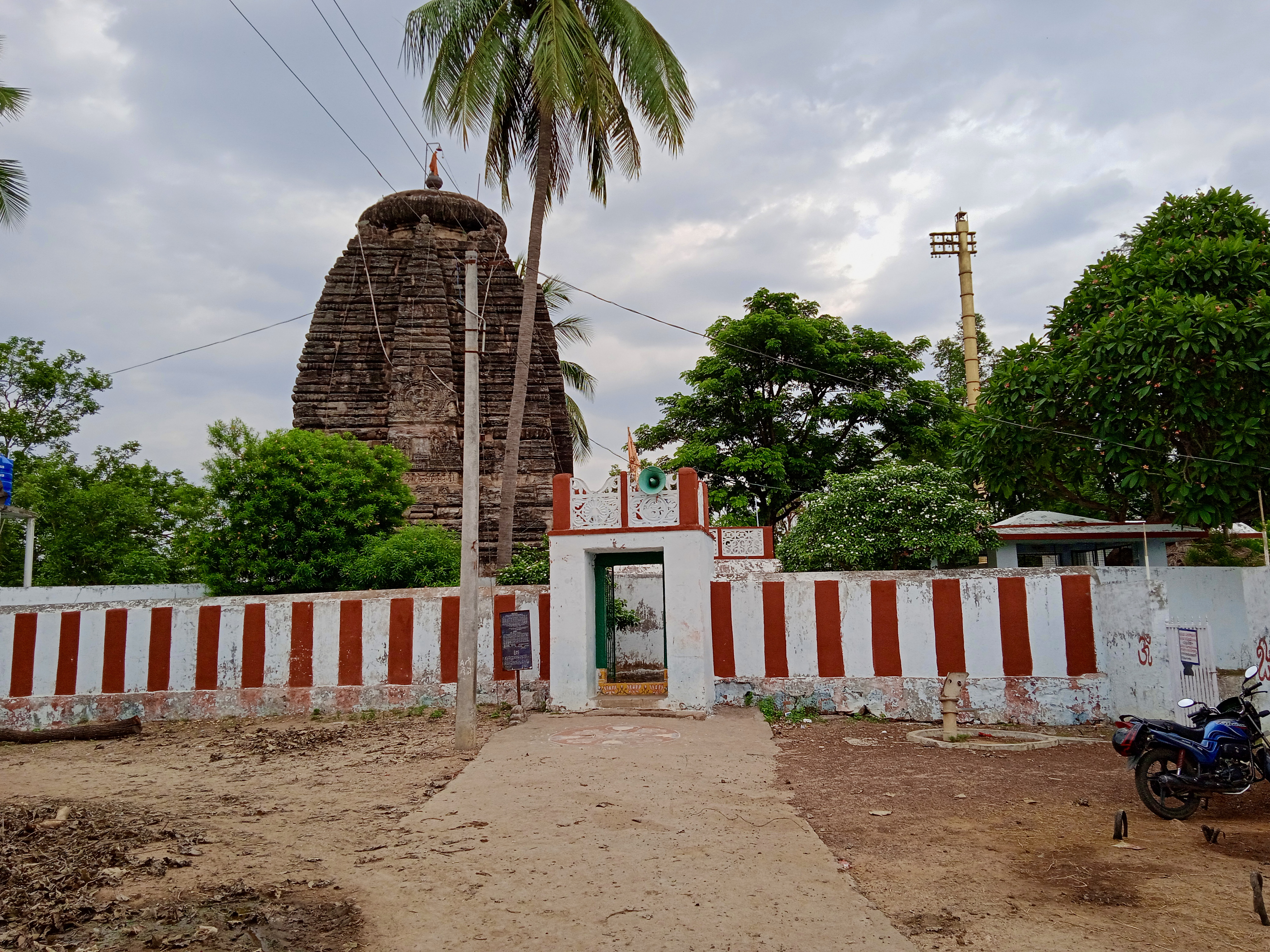
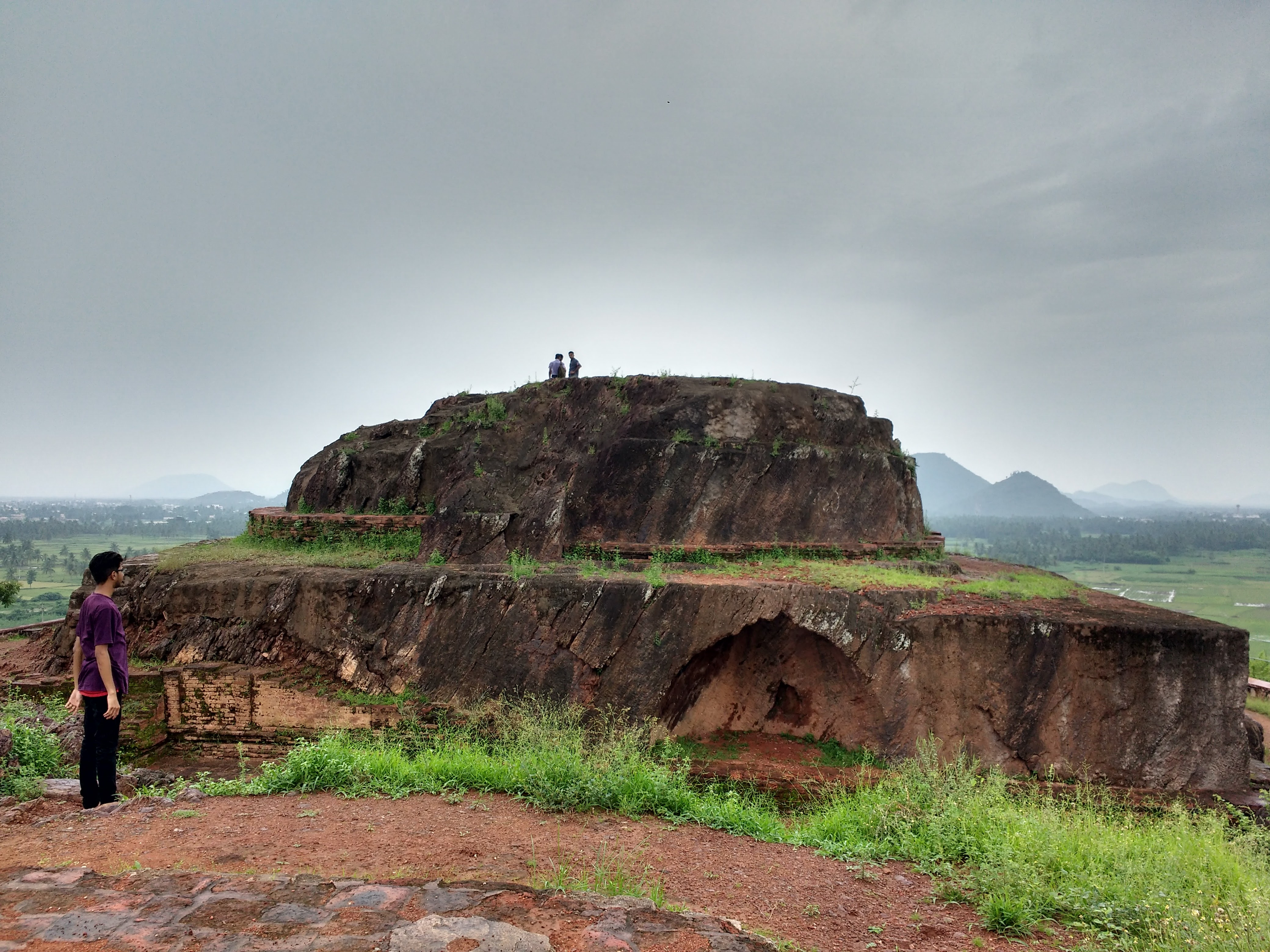
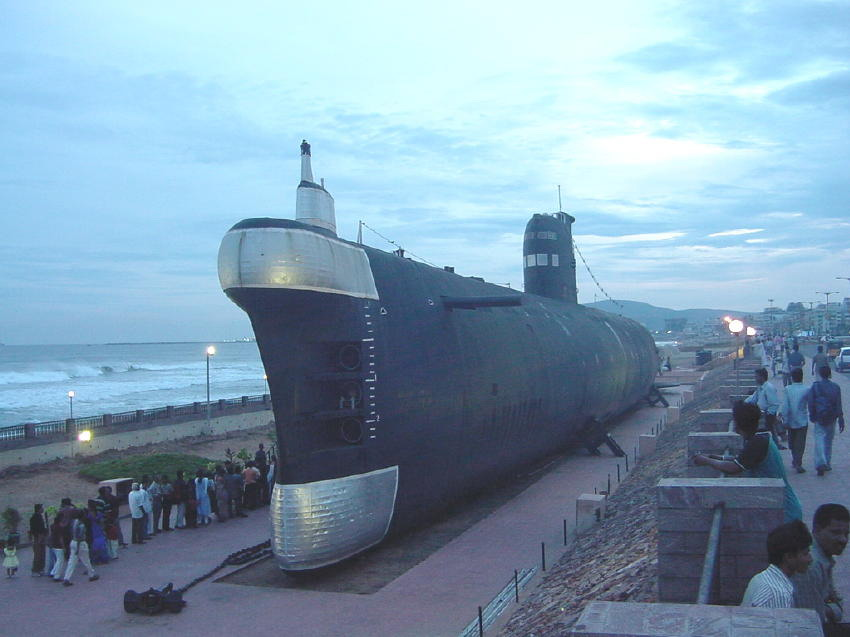
- Clockwise from top: Kailasagiri hill top view, Arasavalli Sun Temple, Ganta stambham, Araku Valley, Kamalingeswara Temple, Bojjannakonda and INS Kursura museum.

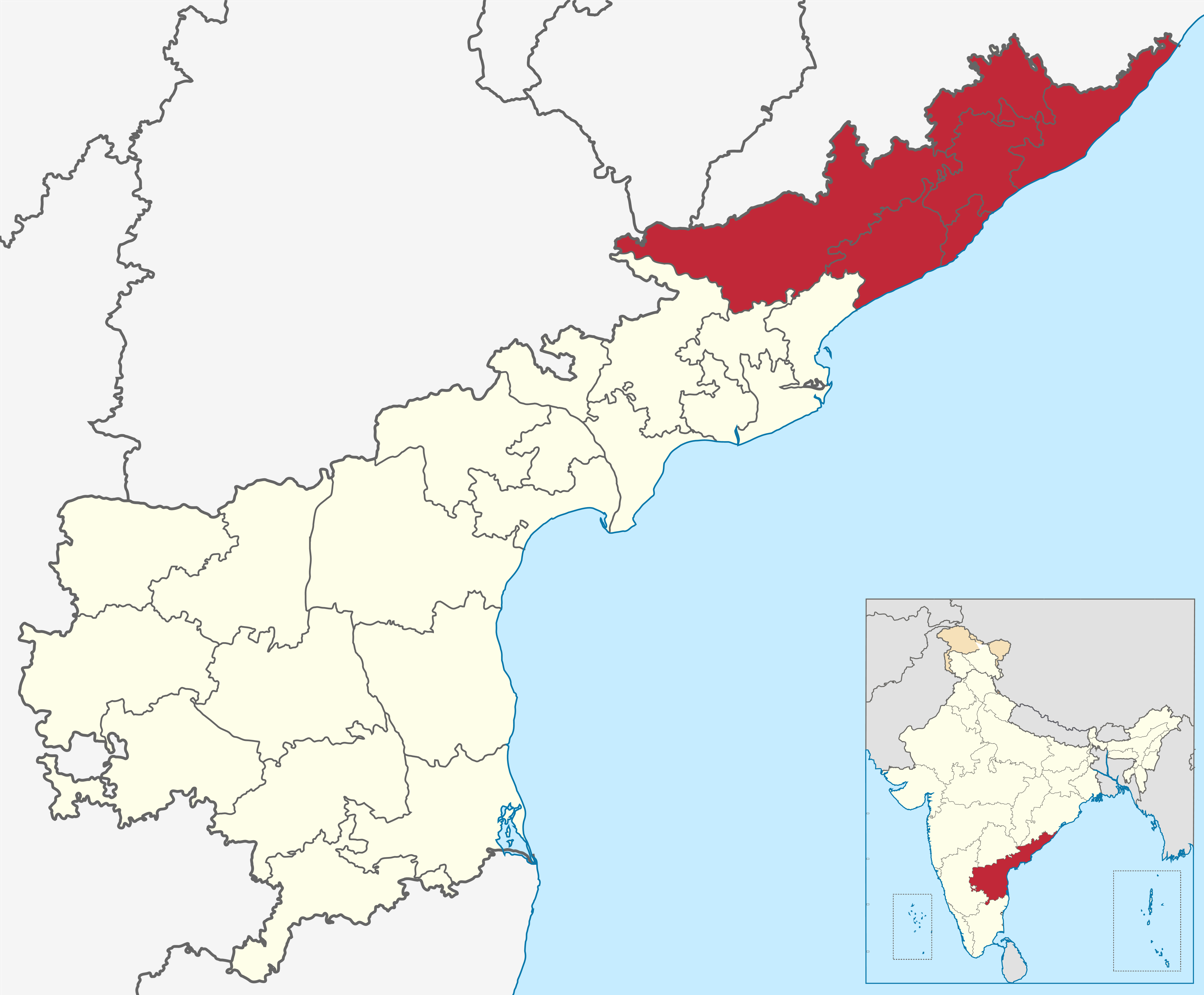
- Uttarandhra region with districts
- Country: India
- State: Andhra Pradesh
- Districts: Alluri Sitharama Raju district; Anakapalli district; Parvathipuram Manyam district; Srikakulam district; Visakhapatnam district; Vizianagaram district
- Largest cities: Visakhapatnam; Vizianagaram; Srikakulam

Area
  - Total: 23,537 km^{2} (9,088 sq mi)

Population (2011)
  - Total: 9,338,177

Languages
  - Official: Telugu
  - Local: Kui · Odia · Koya · Sora · Kuvi
- Time zone: UTC+05:30 (IST)
- Vehicle registration: AP 30, AP 31, AP 32, AP 33, AP 34, AP 35, AP 39, AP40
- Largest airport: Alluri Sitarama Raju International Airport

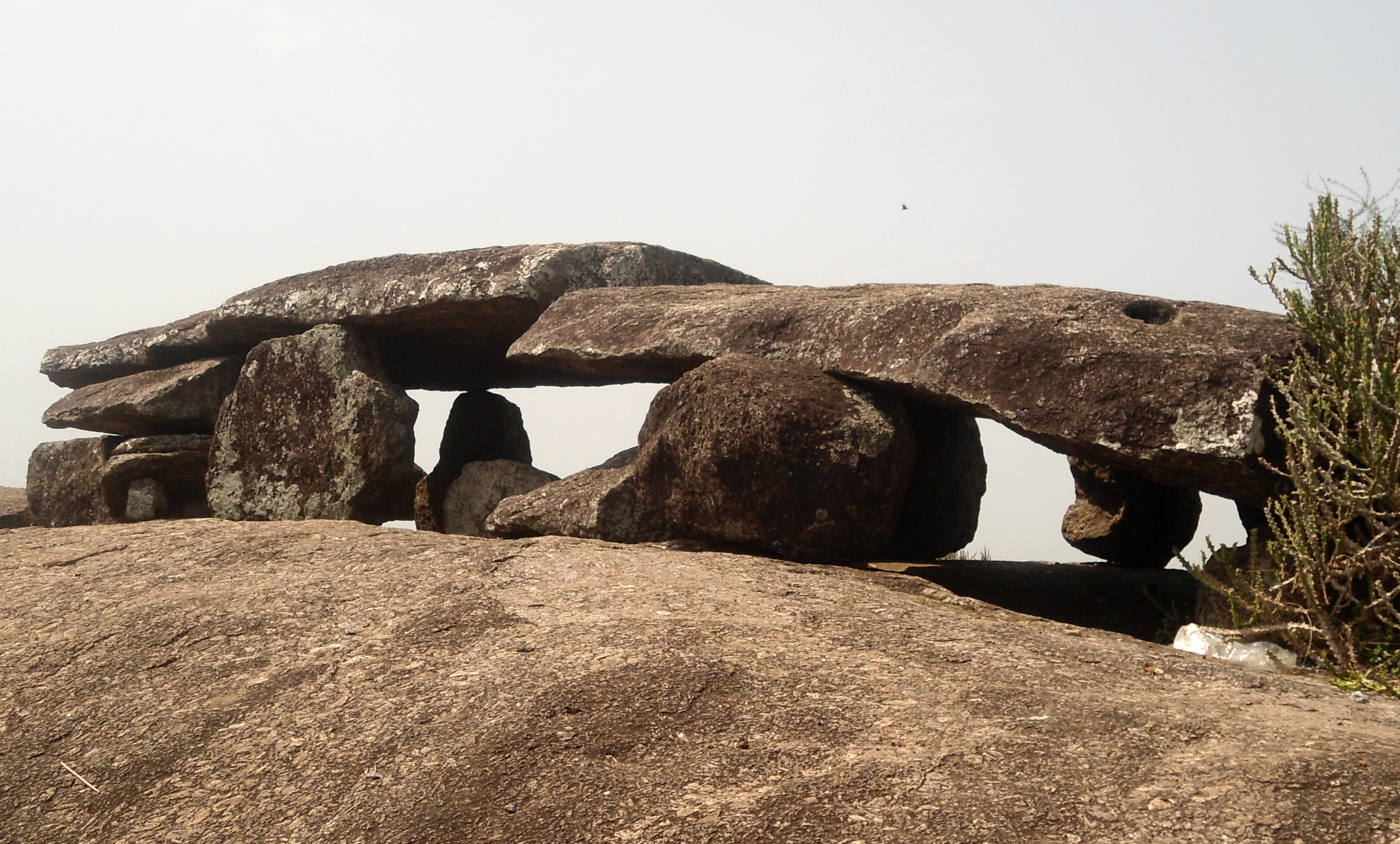
Megalithic Dolmen of Iron Age period at Dannanapeta near Amudalavalasa

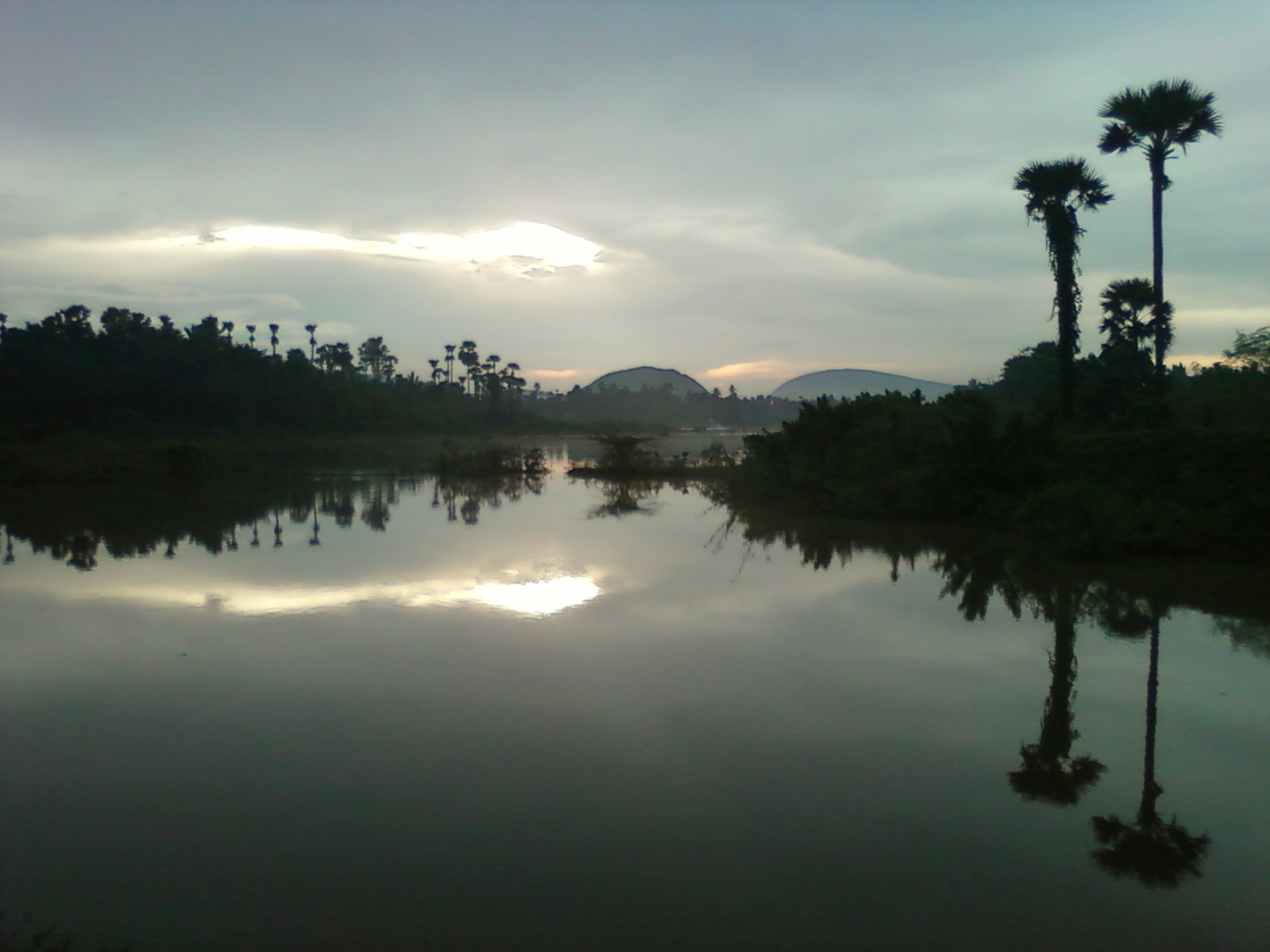
Evening scenic view in peddipalem village of Visakhapatnam District

North Andhra or Uttara Andhra (IAST: Uttara Āndhra), also known as Kalinga Andhra (IAST: Kaḷiṅga Āndhra), is a geographic region in the Indian state of Andhra Pradesh. It is between the Eastern Ghats and the coast of the Bay of Bengal. It comprises seven northern districts of the state, Srikakulam, Parvathipuram Manyam, Polavaram district, Vizianagaram, Visakhapatnam, half of the Alluri Sitharama Raju district and Anakapalli. Alluri Sitharama Raju district was carved out of Erstwhile Visakhapatnam and East Godavari districts. So, half of the Alluri Sitharamaraju district belongs to North Andhra/ Uttara Andhra (Northern part of the district which is sharing its border with Visakhapatnam, Anakapalli and Vizianagaram districts) and the southern part of this district belongs to Coastal Andhra region/ Godavari region. As of 2011 census of India, the region with six districts has a population of 9,338,177.

The region is in the extreme Northeast of Indian state of Andhra Pradesh. The region is skirted to a distance by Kandivalasagedda, Vamshadhara and Bahuda at certain stretches of their courses white a line of heights of the great Eastern Ghats run from Northeast. Kakinada and East Godavari Districts flanks in the southwest while Odisha bounds it on the north and Bay of Bengal on the South and the East and Parts of Telangana and Chhattisgarh on the west. Visakhapatnam is the largest city of the region in terms of population and area.

Uttarandhra region is a part of Coastal Andhra region.

== History ==
The present north coastal districts of Andhra Pradesh were once part of the Kalinga region. Kalinga is a historical region of India. According to political scientist Sudama Misra, the Kalinga janapada originally comprised the area covered by the Puri and Ganjam districts. It is generally defined as the eastern coastal region between the Mahanadi and the Godavari rivers, although its boundaries have fluctuated with the territory of its rulers. The core territory of Kalinga now encompasses a large part of Odisha and northern part of Andhra Pradesh.

Part of the city is known by its colonial British name, Waltair; during the colonial era, the city's hub was the Waltair railway station, and a part of the city is still called Waltair.

=== Early and Medieval history ===
The Kalingas have been mentioned as a major tribe in the legendary text Mahabharata. In the 3rd century BCE, the region came under Mauryan control as a result of the Kalinga War. Ashoka annexed the kingdom after the final battle near the Dhauli hills, the capital Sisupalgarh fell to the Mauryas. After the war, Buddhism prospered in Kalinga and spread to other south eastern regions through maritime trade routes. After the decline of the Mauryan Empire, the region came under the control of the Mahameghavahana family, whose king Kharavela described himself as the "supreme Lord of Kalinga".

After several wars with Satavahanas and other kingdoms, the Kalinga dynasty crumbled and divided into small independent kingdoms. The Gupta ruler Samudragupta sensed an opportunity and invaded the kingdom. Kalinga came under Gupta suzerainty in the 4th century CE after his invasion, the kingdom got united and reclaimed its glory. They ruled the region from Mukhalinga and Dantapura of Northern Andhra. After the Gupta withdrawal, it was ruled by several minor dynasties. These included the Vasishthas, the Matharas, and the Pitrbhaktas.

The last Eastern Ganga ruler Bhanudeva IV was dethroned by Kapilendra Deva in 1435. This event marked the foundation of the Gajapati Empire that ruled over the regions of Utkala (North Odisha) and Kalinga (South Odisha, North Andhra Pradesh). Prataparudra Deva was the last great king of the Suryavamsi Gajapatis and soon after his death his minister Govinda Vidyadhara usurped the throne by murdering the last two Gajapati scions. The fall of the Gajapati Empire meant the independence of their many tributary and feudal states.

Evidently, a tributary kingdom called Nandapur ruled by the Suryavamsa dynasty from 13th century . The king of this kingdom was Vishwanatha Deva Gajapati who began expanding his kingdom in the southern region of Odisha and northern region of Andhra. In 1545, he sent his military commander and the chief of Kasimkota, Mukunda Deva/ Mukunda Harichandan to conquer the northern plains of Odisha which were under control of the weak Bhoi dynasty of Govinda Vidyadhara.

Govinda Vidyadhara signed a truce with Vishwanatha Deva and was granted the status of a tributary state. Mukunda Harichandan was appointed as the minister in order to seek full control over the region, however, he later assassinated the last two Bhoi heirs and declared himself as the new king of Utkala. Nevertheless, Kalinga was still ruled by the Suryavansi kings until they were defeated and became a Vassal of the Golconda Qutb Shahi during the reign of Balarama Deva, who failed to control the vast dominion of his predecessor, Vishwanatha Gajapati. His successors ruled over the region as 'Maharajah of Kalinga' until the feud of Ramachandra Deva I and Balarama Deva III which marked the end of their domination over Kalinga. They came to be known as Kingdom of Jeypore.

=== Modern history ===
In 1674, Vishwambhar Dev of Jeypore kingdom defeated the Faujdar of Chicacole (Srikakulam), appointed by the Qutb Shahi Sultans and claimed an independent semi-monarchy over the Circars. Aurangzeb conquered Golconda in 1687 and the Circars along with the Qutb Shahi Sultanate were annexed to the extensive empire of Aurangzeb. However, the first two Faujdars appointed by the Mughals were defeated and slain in the battlefield by the Maharaja of Jeypore, Raghunath Krishna Dev, who continued to rule claiming independent control over the region until his death in 1708. The successor of Raghunath Krishna proved to be an inefficient ruler and as a result lost a vast territory of the Circars. However, the kings of Jeypore continued to rule their decreased kingdom independently until the advent of the British in 1777. The British destroyed the fort of Jeypore and granted them a demoted status of a Zamindari.

In 1724, Mir Qamar-ud-din Khan was appointed the governor of Hyderabad, with the title Nizam al Mulk. He came to be known as the Nizam of Hyderabad, its de facto ruler. The fourth Nizam Salabat Jang, a son of the Nizam al Mulk, who was indebted for his elevation to the throne to the French East India Company, granted the circars to the French in return for their services. In 1759, through the conquest of the fortress of Masulipatnam, the maritime provinces from the river Gundlakamma to the Chilka Lake were transferred from the French to the British. But the British left them under the administration of the Nizam, with the exception of Masulipatnam, a valuable port, which was retained by the British.

In 1765 Lord Robert Clive obtained from the Mughal emperor Shah Alam II a grant of the five Circars. The fort of Kondapalli was seized by the British as an opening move. On 12 November 1766 a treaty of alliance was signed with Nizam Ali Khan by which the British undertook to maintain troops for the Nizam's assistance. By a second treaty, often referred to as the Treaty of Masulipatnam, signed on 1 March 1768, the Nizam acknowledged the validity of Shah Alam's grant and resigned the Circars to the British East India Company, receiving as a mark of friendship an annuity of £50,000. Finally, in 1823, the claims of the Nizam over the Northern Circars were bought outright by the Company, and they became a British possession. The Northern Circars were governed as part of Madras Presidency until India's independence in 1947, after which the presidency became India's Madras State.

=== Post independence ===
In an effort to gain an independent state based on linguistic identity, and to protect the interests of the Telugu-speaking people of Madras State, Potti Sreeramulu fasted to death in 1952. As Madras became a bone of contention, in 1949 a JVP committee report stated: "Andhra Province could be formed provided the Andhras give up their claim on the city of Madras [now Chennai]". After Potti Sreeramulu's death, the Telugu-speaking area of Andhra State was carved out of Madras State on 1 October 1953, with Kurnool as its capital city. On the basis of the gentlemen's agreement of 1 November 1956, the States Reorganisation Act formed combined Andhra Pradesh by merging Andhra State with the Telugu-speaking areas of the already existing Hyderabad State. Hyderabad was made the capital of the new state.

In February 2014, the Andhra Pradesh Reorganisation Act, 2014 bill was passed by the Parliament of India for the formation of the Telangana state comprising ten districts. Hyderabad will remain as a joint capital for not exceeding ten years. The new state of Telangana came into existence on 2 June 2014 after approval from the President of India. Number of petitions questioning the validity of Andhra Pradesh Reorganisation Act, 2014 is long pending for the verdict since April 2014 before the Supreme Court constitutional bench.

In 2017, Andhra Pradesh Government began operating from the newly planned capital city Amaravati. In August 2020, Andhra Pradesh Legislative Assembly passed Andhra Pradesh Decentralisation and Inclusive Development of All Regions Act, 2020. According to its provisions, Visakhapatnam is the executive capital while Amaravati and Kurnool serve as legislative and judicial capitals, respectively. The decision resulted in widespread protests by the farmers of Amaravati. The act has been challenged in Andhra Pradesh High Court, which ordered to maintain status quo until the court completes its hearing.

== Geography ==
Nagavali River rises in the eastern slopes of the Eastern Ghats near Lakhbahal in the Kalahandi district of Odisha at an elevation of about 1,300 metres. The total length of the river is about 256 km, of which 161 km are in Odisha and the rest in Andhra Pradesh. The catchment area of the basin is 9,510 square km. Nagavali is an interstate river with 4462 km2 and 5048 km2 river basin area located in Odisha and Andhra Pradesh respectively. The river basin receives 1000 mm average rain fall annually. The uplands of the river basin are hilly areas with predominantly tribal populated. It drains parts of the Kalahandi, Rayagada and Koraput districts of Odisha and Srikakulam, Vizianagaram and Visakhapatnam districts of Andhra Pradesh. Vamsadhara River originates in the border of Thuamul Rampur in the Kalahandi district and Kalyansinghpur in Rayagada district of Odisha and runs for a distance of about 254 kilometers, where it joins the Bay of Bengal at Kalingapatnam, Andhra Pradesh. The total catchment area of the river basin is about 10,830 square kilometers.

== Climate ==
The average elevation of this region ranges from 45 metres to 100 meters. South West Monsoon : 1000–1100 mm. Temperatures range from Max. 33-36 °C & Min. 26-27 °C. Red soils and Black soils with clay base, Pockets of acidic soils, laterite soils, Soils with PH 4-5.

== Economy ==
There are special economic zones (SEZs) and industrial corridors such as Visakhapatnam Special Economic Zone (VSEZ), APSEZ, APIIC, Aganumpudi Industrial Park, Visakha Dairy, JNPC, Andhra Pradesh Medtech Zone.

=== Agriculture ===
Major crops grown in this region are rice, black gram, green gram, groundnut, sugarcane, sesame, pearl millet, Mesta, finger millets, and horse gram. This region is home to many co-operative sugar factories, jute mills, cashew processing industries.

Visakha Dairy is second biggest co-operative dairy in India.

=== Industries ===
Visakhapatnam is the biggest city of the region and is placed 10th among the top 15 cities contributing to India's overall Gross domestic product. The industrial city, Visakhapatnam has contributed a GDP of $43.5 billion. The city has state owned heavy industries and a steel plant.

- Visakhapatnam Steel Plant a leading Central PSU under the Ministry of Steel is the first shore based Integrated Steel Plant in the country.
- Visakhapatnam Port is one of the major ports in India.
- Hindustan Petroleum Corporation Limited is one of the two oil refineries of HPCL in India
- Hindustan Shipyard Limited (HSL) is a shipyard located in Visakhapatnam on the east coast of India.
- Naval Dockyard (Visakhapatnam)
- Bharat Heavy Electricals Limited
- Gangavaram Port
- Simhadri Super Thermal Power Station

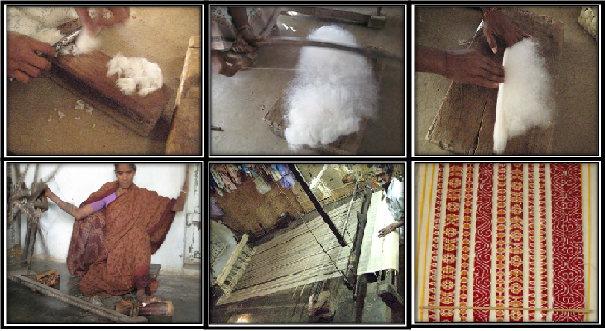
Weaving at Ponduru

== Politics ==
The parliament constituencies of Uttarandhra are.

- Araku
- Srikakulam
- Vizianagaram
- Visakhapatnam
- Anakapalli

== Education ==
=== Central Universities ===
- Central Tribal University of Andhra Pradesh, Vizianagaram

=== Universities ===
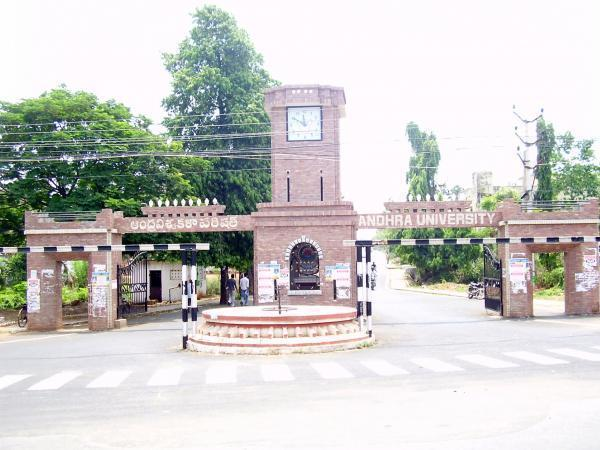
Andhra University, Visakhapatnam

- Andhra University, Visakhapatnam
- Jawaharlal Nehru Technological University - Gurajada, Vizianagaram
- Dr. B. R. Ambedkar University, Srikakulam
- GITAM University, Visakhapatnam
- Damodaram Sanjivayya National Law University
- Indian Maritime University

=== Medical colleges ===
- Andhra Medical College, Visakhapatnam
- Gayatri Vidya Parishad Institute of Health Care and Medical Technology, Visakhapatnam
- Gitam Institute of Medical Science and Research, Visakhapatnam
- Government Medical College, Srikakulam
- Great Eastern Medical School and Hospital, Srikakulam
- Maharaja Institute of Medical Sciences, Vizianagaram
- NRI Institute of Medical Sciences, Visakhapatnam

=== Central Institutions ===
- Indian Institute of Management Visakhapatnam
- Indian Institute of Petroleum and Energy
- National Institute of Oceanography, India
- Kalam Institute of Health Technology, Visakhapatnam

== Transport ==
- The South Coast Railway Zone(SCoR) with Vishakhapatnam Railway Station is one of the busiest railway junctions in India, serving many trains.
- Vishakhapatnam Port is the major port in Uttarandhra Region. The state of Andhra Pradesh is the second-busiest maritime state (after Gujarat) in terms of cargo handled. Visakhapatnam Port is one of the busiest cargo-handling ports in the country.
- The airport which is currently operating in this region is Vishakhapatnam International Airport. Another international airport in this region which is under construction is Bhogapuram International Airport.
- Gangavaram Port at Vishakhapatnam is major private port in this region.

== People from Uttarandhra ==
- Alluri Sitarama Raju (Freedom fighter, Belongs to Godavari districts but participated in the freedom struggle by empowering the tribals from East Godavari and Visakhapatnam districts(Now Alluri seetharamaraju district)).
- Chowdary Satyanarayana (Freedom fighter, Politician, Rights Activist)
- Tenneti Viswanadham (Freedom fighter and politician)
- Kandala Subrahmanya Tilak (Indian lawyer, Socialist leader, Indian freedom activist and Parliamentarian)
- Gouthu Latchanna (veteran freedom fighter)
- Gurazada Apparao (Social reformer)
- Dwaram Venkataswamy Naidu (violinist)
- Gidugu Venkata Ramamurthy (doyen of Spoken Telugu movement)
- Srirangam Srinivasarao (poet)
- Aarudhra (poet, lyricist, songwriter, translator and writer)
- Ajjada Adibhatla Narayana Dasu (poet, musician, dancer, linguist and philosopher)
- Rachakonda Viswanatha Sastry (writer)
- Lanka Sundaram (Indian parliamentarian and an expert in international law)
- Gedela Srinubabu (Politician and Businessman)
- Venugopal Rao(cricketer)
- P. Susheela (singer)
- Gollapudi Maruti Rao
- Sirivennela Sitaramasastri (lyricist)
- Yadla Gopalarao (theatre artist)
- Sarath Babu (Tollywood movie actor)
- Puri Jagannadh (movie director)
- Parasuram (movie director)
- Ramana Gogula
- Grandhi Mallikarjuna Rao (founder chairman of GMR Group)
- Kodi Rammurthy Naidu (Indian bodybuilder)
- Karnam Malleswari (Indian weightlifter, Olympic medalist)
- Chaganti Somayajulu (Telugu story writers)
- Vulimiri Ramalingaswami (pathologist and ex-Director AIIMS New Delhi and ICMR)
- Hilda Mary Lazarus (Christian missionary, gynecologist and obstetrician)
- Vaddadi Papaiah (artist)
- Kotcherlakota Rangadhama Rao (physicist)
- Pingali Nagendrarao (script writer, playwright and lyricist)
- Raja Abel (Tollywood actor)
- Rashmi Gautam (Tollywood actress)
- Anisha Ambrose (Tollywood actress)
- Ipsita Pati (actress)
- Zarina Wahab (actress)
- Devika Rani (Indian film actress)
- Mallikarjuna Rao (Tollywood actor)
- G.Anand (playback singer and music director)
- J.V. Somayajulu (Indian theatre and film actor)
- E. L. Quirk (founder of Quirk Memorial Baptist Church)
- S. Rajeswara Rao (composer)

=== Anglo-Indians Born in Uttarandhra ===
- Edward Hay Mackenzie Elliot (Governor of New Zealand)
- Arthur Luard (English cricketer)
- George William Forbes Playfair (British businessman and member of the Legislative Council of Hong Kong)

== Religious Destinations ==
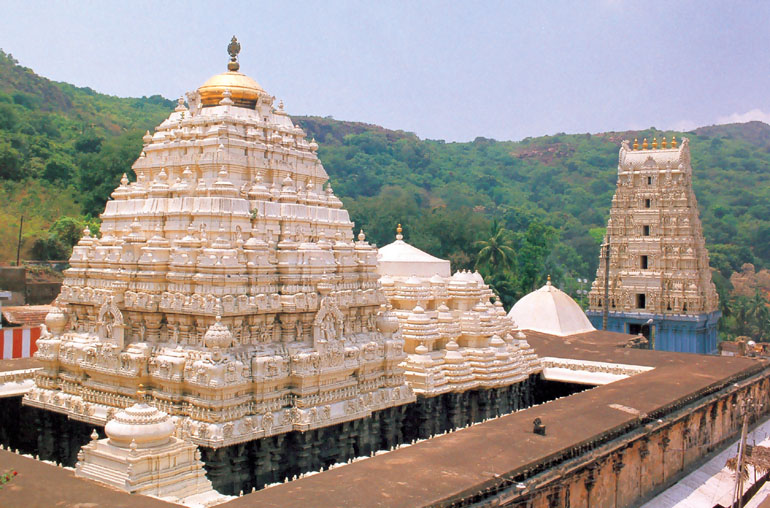
Simhachalam Temple

UttarAndhra has many important places of pilgrimage. Simhachalam Temple, abode of Lord Narasimha Swamy is one of the richest and the most visited place of worship in the State. The other being:

- Paidithalli Ammavari temple
- Arasavilli Surya narayana swamy temple
- Sri Kurmam temple
- Sri Mukhalingam
- Sri Kanaka Maha Lakshmi temple
- Nookambika temple
- Sampath Vinayaka temple
- Appikonda
- Ramatheertham
- Ramanarayanam
- Ross Hill Church
- Archbishops of Visakhapatnam
- Upamaka Sri Venkateshwara swamy temple
- Madhavadhara

=== Buddhist sites ===
There are many Buddhist sites like Thotlakonda, Bhavikonda, Shankaram, Pavurallakonda, Kotturu Dhanadibbalu, Gudiwada dibba, Bojjanakonda.

== See also ==
- Coastal Andhra
- Rayalaseema
- List of districts of Andhra Pradesh by regions

== Sources ==
- Mohanty, Indrajit (2013). Jeypore - A Historical Perspective (PDF). Government of Odisha State. Archived from the original (PDF) on 30 March 2024.
- KBS Singh (1939). Nandapur A Forsaken Kingdom. Utkal Sahitya Press.
- Dineschandra Sircar (1971). Studies in the Geography of Ancient and Medieval India. Motilal Banarsidass. ISBN 978-81-208-0690-0.
- Snigdha Tripathy (1997). Inscriptions of Orissa. Vol. I - Circa 5th-8th centuries A.D. Indian Council of Historical Research and Motilal Banarsidass. ISBN 978-81-208-1077-8.
