= A. L. Narayan =

Indian scientist (1887–1973)

A. L. Narayana
- Born: 1887; Mukkamala, East Godavari district, Madras Presidency, India
- Died: 7 March 1973 (aged 85–86); Madras, India
- Education: Madras University
- Scientific career
- Fields: Physics
- Workplaces: Maharajah's College, Kodaikanal Solar Observatory, Andhra University

Appadvedula Lakshmi Narayan, better known as A. L. Narayan BA, MA, D.Sc., F.I.P. (1887 – 7 March 1973) was an Indian astrophysicist and was the first Indian Director of Kodaikanal Solar Observatory during between 1937 and 1946. He was born in 1887 to Shri Appadvedula Vyasulu and Smt. Mahalakshmi in the Mukkamala village of East Godavari District of Andhra Pradesh. He studied up to matriculation in the higher secondary school at Kothapeta. He developed keen interest in the study of Science and continued his studies in the Government Arts College, Rajahmundry. He passed the B.A. degree and did Postgraduation (M.A.) in Physics from the University of Madras in 1914. He has joined as a lecturer in physics in Maharajah's College of Vizianagaram.

== Career ==
At that time, Physics was taught only up to the Intermediate level. He has obtained affiliation for the degree course B.A. in Physics of the University of Madras in 1918. He trained the first batch of four students for the degree examination of 1920. Dr. K. Rangadhama Rao, who later became a pioneer in India in Spectroscopic research was in his first batch.

He has joined as assistant director at the Solar Physics Observatory, Kodaikanal, in 1929. He started more extensive and intensive work with a view to make the institution a center of spectroscopic research. The observatory was famous for observations on solar and stellar physics through the work of the great Astronomer John Evershed, who was its Director for many years. In recognition of his contributions, he was promoted as Director of the Observatory. He was the first Indian to occupy the post. During his regime, the library was enlarged by the acquisition of a large number of books and periodicals on astronomy, mathematics, physics, geophysics, statistics and allied sciences. He also expanded the workshop and spent considerable time in improving its working.

During the Second World War, some of the senior staff members were shifted for meteorological work in connection with the war. But Narayan could not rest, and carried on his research work with the meagre staff remaining with him.

After the War, the Government of India appointed a Committee for the post-war development of astronomy and astrophysics in the country, with particular reference to the expansion of the activities of the Kodaikanal Observatory under the Chairmanship of Professor M. N. Saha. Dr Narayan was an active member of the committee and was instrumental in launching the expansion of the Observatory. He retired from the post of Director in 1947 at the age of 60 years.

The Rajah Saheb of Vizianagaram offered him the post of the Principal of Maharajah's College, Vizianagaram in 1948. His administration was marked by progressive thinking, punctuality and discipline. He made the college a model for the Andhra University area. As ex officio member of the Senate of the Andhra University and was elected to the Syndicate. He made distinctive contribution to the advancement of scientific learning in the university. He has retired as Principal of Maharajahs College in 1956 after a distinguished service for about eight years. He was responsible for starting two additional colleges, one for Teachers' Training and the other for Girls.

He was appointed as Vice-Chancellor of Andhra University, Visakhapatnam in 1961, to follow Dr. V. S. Krishna. He was a strict disciplinarian, and did not hesitate to enforce discipline at any cost keeping aside the selfish interests. He proved to be a worthy successor to his eminent predecessors C. R. Reddy and S. Radhakrishnan, who made the Andhra University as one of the best Universities in India. He encouraged talented young men to take up doctoral and post-doctoral researches in their respective branches under the guidance of eminent professors. He was instrumental in establishing many research scholarships and grants procured from the University Grants Commission, the Council of Scientific and Industrial Research and other Indian institutions. He has consolidated the functioning of the university in the academic and administrative aspects. He finally retired as Vice-Chancellor in 1966, after serving the university for five years.

He died on 7 March 1973 at Madras. He was survived by his wife, two sons and four daughters.

== Honours ==
- He was Fellow of the Institute of Physics, London.
- He was Fellow of the National Institute of Sciences, India (presently, Indian National Science Academy).
- He was President of the Physics Section of the Indian Science Congress held at Benares.
- He was member of the Andhra Pradesh Planning Commission.
- He was the recipient of the "Maharaja of Travancore Curzon Memorial Prize" in recognition of his research work in Science.
