= C. Chandrasekhara Sastri =

Calamur Chandrasekhara Sastri (1854–1887), sometimes Sastry or Sastriyar, was the first Principal and Professor of English and Sanskrit of the Maharajah's College at Vizianagaram from his appointment in 1875, developing it from a secondary school with four teachers into a graduate institution before his death at the age of 32 in 1887, with the support of the contemporaneously reigning Maharajas of Vizianagaram, Pusapati Vijayarama Gajapathi Raju III and Pusapati Ananda Gajapati Raju. He was the first Indian principal of any South Indian college at the time.

Sastri was born to C. Sivarama Sastri and his wife Lakshmi, into the Calamur dynasty; his nephew C. Sivaramamurti dedicated his Chitrasūtra of the Vishṇudharmottara to him and credited him with raising his father, C. Sundara Sastri. He was also maternal uncle to N. Subrahmanyam and Bharati Krishna Tirtha, and namesake to his cousin Rao Saheb Calamur Chandrasekhara Iyer, Sub-Registrar of Madras and Assistant Registrar of the High Court.

After the death of a young Gurajada Apparao's father, Sastri took him in, covering his expenses and fees; Apparao would revere him as a father-figure thereafter. Apparao's ability to speak English was substantially owed to Sastri.
