= Mukkamala =

Mukkamala may refer to:

- Mukkamala (actor) (1920–1982), Indian Telugu-language actor
- Mukkamala, East Godavari district, Andhra Pradesh, India
- Mukkamala, West Godavari district, Andhra Pradesh, India
