= Toycathon =

Toycathon, is an inter-ministerial initiative of the Indian government that focuses on conceptualizing toys or games based on Indian civilization, heritage, culture, mythology, history, ethos, technology, ethnicity, national heroes and important events. It aims to promote vedic mathematics, positive behaviour, physical and mental fitness.

It was launched on 5 January 2021, the first of its kind in the country. The broader aim of the 'Toycathon' is to "explore India's potential to build and sustain a creative ecosystem for the development of toys and games to celebrate Aatma Nirbhar Bharat'." Prime Minister Modi, while addressing the participants, said, “Toys and games influence our mental power, creativity and our economy. All of us know that a child’s first school is his/her family. But the first book and first friends are toys”.

A total of 1.29 lakh students registered for the competition and submitted 17000 ideas. 1567 ideas were shortlisted for a three day online finale which was held from June 22 to 24. A total of 117 teams were declared winners of Toycathon 2021 under different themes.
