= G. Ramanujulu Naidu =

Gorle Ramanujulu Naidu

Judge of Andhra Pradesh High Court
- In office 1978–1992

Personal details
- Born: 19 June 1929 Salur, Andhra Pradesh
- Spouse: Gorle Rama Devi

G. Ramanujulu Naidu B.L. (born 19 June 1929) is an Indian former judge of Andhra Pradesh High Court.

== Brief lifesketch ==
Naidu was born on 19 June 1929 and educated at Board High School, Salur. He took his Degree from Maharajah's College, Vizianagaram during 1947-49 and Bachelor of Law (B.L.) Degree of Andhra University during 1949-51. He stood first in both F.L. and B.L., Examinations of Andhra University and recipient of all prizes and medals then instituted in the Faculty of Law. He was enrolled as an Advocate on 21 July 1952 in the Composite High Court of Madras. He has worked as Standing Counsel for Andhra University, Andhra Pradesh State Financial Corporation and Life Insurance Corporation of India. He has worked as Lecturer in Law, Osmania University.

Naidu was appointed as District Judge on 11 February 1967 and worked as District Judge in different districts. He was working as Chief Judge, City Civil Court, Hyderabad. He was appointed as Additional Judge of the High court of Andhra Pradesh on 10 November 1978 and as permanent Judge of the Andhra Pradesh High Court on 23 July 1980.
