= Bharati Krishna Tirtha =

Indian mathematician (1884–1960)

His Holiness Swami Bharati Krishna Tirtha Maharaj
- Title: 'His Holiness'Jagadguru Shankaracharya

Personal life
- Born: Venkataraman Shastri; 14 March 1884 Tirunelveli, Madras Presidency, British India
- Died: 2 February 1960 (aged 75)
- Notable work: Vedic Mathematics
- Education: University of Madras

Religious life
- Religion: Hinduism
- Temple: Govardhana Pitha
- Philosophy: Advaita Vedanta
- Lineage: Dashanami Sampradaya
- Monastic name: Svami Bharati Krsna Tirtha
- Ordination: Sannyasa
- Initiation: Sannyasa; 4 July 1919; Varanasi by Jagadguru Shankaracharya Swami Trivikrama Tirtha of Dwarka

Religious career
- Teacher: Jagadguru Shankaracharya Sachchidananda Shivabhinava Narasimha Bharati of Sringeri
- Post: 143rd Jagadguru Sankaracarya of Puri
- Predecessor: Jagadguru Shankaracharya Svami Madhusudana Tirtha of Puri
- Previous post: Jagadguru Sankaracarya of Dwarka
- Students: Jagadguru Shankaracharya Chandrashekhara Bharati III of Sringeri

Saraswati P. Venkataraman Sastri (IAST: P. Veṅkatarāmaṇ Śāstrī), hieratically titled H.H. Jagadguru Shankaracharya Swami Bharatikrishna Tirtha (IAST: Jagadguru Śaṅkarācārya Svāmī Bhāratīkṛṣṇa Tīrtha) (1884–1960), was Shankaracharya and officiating pontiff of Dwaraka Math, and then the 143rd Shankaracharya and supreme pontiff of Govardhana Math in Puri in the Indian state of Odisha, from 1925 through 1960. He is particularly known for his book Vedic Mathematics, being the first Sankaracarya in history to visit the West, and for his connection with nationalist aspirations, thus earning him the title 'Father of the Vedic Mathematics'.

== Early life ==
Venkataraman Shastri (IAST: Veṅkatarāmaṇ Śāstrī) was born on 14 March 1884 to a Tamil Brahmin family. His father P. Narasimha Shastri was a tehsildar at Tirunelveli in Madras Presidency, who later became the Deputy Collector of the Presidency. His uncle C. Chandrasekhara Sastri was the Principal and Professor of English and Sanskritat the Maharaja's College in Vizianagaram, while his great-grandfather Justice C. V. Runganada Sastri was a judge in the Madras High Court. His cousins Dewan Bahadur Sir C. V. Kumaraswami Sastri and Dewan Bahadur Viswanatha Sastri were also justices of the High Court. Other cousins and cousins-in-law included Sir C.P. Ramaswami Iyer, C. R. Pattabhiraman, M. R. Srinivasan, and C. V. Ranganathan.

== Education ==
Venkataraman joined the National College in Trichinopoly. After this, he moved to the Church Missionary Society College and eventually the Hindu College, both in Tirunelveli. Venkataraman passed his matriculation examination from Madras University in January 1899, where he also finished first.

Although Venkataraman always performed well in subjects such as mathematics, sciences and humanities, he was also proficient in languages and particularly skillful in Sanskrit. According to his own testimonials, Sanskrit and oratory were his favourite subjects. Due to his knowledge of the language, he was conferred the title "Saraswati" at the age of 16 by the Madras Sanskrit Association in July 1899. At about that time, Venkataraman was profoundly influenced by his Sanskrit guru Vedam Venkatrai Shastri.

Venkataraman passed the B.A. examination in 1902. He then appeared for the M.A. examination for the American College of Sciences in Rochester, New York from the Bombay centre in 1903. He also contributed to W. T. Stead's Review of Reviews on diverse topics in religion and science. During his college days, he also wrote extensively on history, sociology, philosophy, politics, and literature.

== Early public life ==
Venkataraman worked under Gopal Krishna Gokhale in 1905 for the National Education Movement and the South African Indian problems. However, his inclination towards Hindu studies led him to study the ancient Indian holy scripture Adhyātma-Vidyā. In 1908, he joined the Sringeri Matha in Mysore to study under Swami Satchidananda Sivabhinava Nrisimha Bharati (IAST: Svāmī Saccidānandaśivābhinavanṛsiṁha Bhāratī, the Sankaracarya of Sringeri. However, his spiritual practice was interrupted when he was pressured by nationalist leaders to head the newly-started National College at Rajamahendry. Prof. Venkataraman Shastri taught at the college for three years. But in 1911, he suddenly left the college to go back to Sringeri Math.

== Spiritual path ==
Returning to Sringeri, Venkataraman spent the next eight years studying Advaita Vedanta and Sastra (scripture) under Jagadguru Sankaracarya Satcitananda Sivabhinava Nrisimha Bharati.

During those years, the Jagadguru initiated Venkatraman into yogic practices. Venkataraman also practiced meditation, Brahma-sadhana and Yoga-sādhāna, in the nearby forests. He is said to have attained self-realisation during his years at Sringeri Math. He would leave society and practice meditation in seclusion for many days. During those eight years, he also taught Sanskrit and philosophy at local schools and ashrams. He delivered a series of sixteen lectures on Adi Shankara's philosophy at Shankar Institute of Philosophy, Amalner (Khandesh). During that time, he also lectured as a guest professor at institutions in Mumbai, Pune and Khandesh.

=== Initiation into Sannyasa ===
After Venkataraman's eight-year practice and study of Vedanta, he was initiated into sannyasa, in the Tirtha sub-order of the Dashanami Sampradaya, in Varanasi by Jagadguru Shankaracharya (IAST: Jagadguru Śaṅkarācārya) Swami Trivikrama Tirtha (IAST: Svāmī Trivikrāma Tīrtha) of Dwarka Sharada Peetham in Dwarka on July 4, 1919, receiving the name "Swami Bharatikrishna Tirtha".

=== Shankaracharya of Govardhana Matha ===
The Sankaracarya of Govardhana Math, Swami Madhusudhana Tirtha, was in failing health and was greatly impressed with Bharatikrishna. Madhusudana requested Bharatikrishna to succeed him at Govardhana Matha. Bharatikrishna declined the offer. In 1925, however, Madhusudhana's health worsened and Bharatikrishna was compelled to accept the Govardhana gaddi (chair). In 1925, Bharatikrishna assumed the pontificate of Govardhana Math. He installed Swami Swarupananda Saraswati as the new Sankaracarya of Dwarka Sharada Peetham.

== Politics ==
In 1921, Bharatikrishna was one of the seven people arrested in what became known as the "Karachi case". Mohammad Ali Jouhar, Shaukat Ali, Saifuddin Kitchlew, Maulana Hussain Ahmed, Pir Ghulam Mujaddid, Maulana Nisar Ahmed, and Bharatikrishna were charged with preaching in favor of a fatwa issued by the Muslim religious heads of India advocating all Muslims to not cooperate with the government. While Bharatikrishna was eventually acquitted, the other six, who were all Muslim, were sentenced to two years imprisonment.

== Jagadguru Shankaracharya ==
As Shankaracharya of Govardhana Matha, Bharatikrishna toured several countries in thirty-five years to promote Dharma and Indian culture. He wrote a number of treatises and books on religion, science, mathematics, world peace, and social issues. In 1953, at Nagpur, he founded the Sri Vishwa Punarnirmana Sangha (World Reconstruction Association). The administrative board initially consisted of Bharatikrishna's disciples and supporters, then later included distinguished personalities. The Chief Justice of India, Justice B. P. Sinha, served as its President. Dr. C. D. Deshmukh, the ex-Finance Minister of India and ex-Chairman of the University Grants Commission served as Vice-President.

In February 1958, Bharatikrishna went to Britain and the United States to speak on Vedanta, staying for three months in Los Angeles, California. This was the first trip outside India by a Sankaracarya. The tour was sponsored by the Self-Realization Fellowship, the yoga society founded by Paramahansa Yogananda. At that time, Albert Rudolph, or "Rudi", reportedly became one of Bharatikrishna's students.

Bharatikrishna also attended various national and international conferences on yoga and on religion. He served as Sankaracarya of Govardhana Matha until his death in 1960.

In 1965, a Chair of Vedic Studies was founded at Banaras Hindu University by Arvind N. Mafatlal, a generous Mumbai business magnate and devotee of Bharatikrishna.

== Vedic Mathematics ==
Bharatikrishna's book, Vedic Mathematics, is a list of sixteen terse sūtras, or "aphorisms", discussing strategies for mental calculation. Bharatikrishna claimed that he found the sūtras after years of studying the Vedas, a set of sacred ancient Hindu scriptures.
