= Kolluri Kamasastry =

Kolluri Kamasastry (Telugu: కొల్లూరి కామశాస్త్రి) (1840–1907) was a Sanskrit scholar. He was a poet who adorned in Vizianagaram Pusapati Ananda Gajapati Raju Maharaja's court. He translated many Sanskrit books into Telugu language. "Andhra dharma Sindhu" and "Sudra Kamalakaramu" are his two most important translations in to Telugu. He was also the author of "Raghunayaka Satakamu".
