= Maharajah's College =

Indian academic institution in Vizianagaram, Andhra Pradesh

- Maharaja's College Seal
- Motto: तमसो मा ज्योतिर्गमय
- Type: Private
- Established: 1879
- Founders: Maharaja Pusapati Vijayarama Gajapathi Raju; Maharaja Sir Pusapati Ananda Gajapati Raju; C. Chandrasekhara Sastri
- Principal: Dr. G.A.Kalyani
- Chairman: Sri Pusapati Ananda Gajapati Raju
- Undergraduates: 2,192 per year
- Location: Vizianagaram, Andhra Pradesh, India; 18.1144°N 83.4097°E
- Campus: Urban
- Website: mracollegevzm.com

Maharajah's College, or M. R. College, established in 1879, it is an autonomous institution located in Vizianagaram, Andhra Pradesh.

== History ==
The institution was founded by Sir Pusapati Vijayarama Gajapathi Raju, the 9th Maharajah of Vizianagram. It was started as a middle school in 1857 and upgraded to a high school in 1868. It was upgraded to a college in 1879 under the University of Madras, under the leadership of Principal C. Chandrasekhara Sastri, Professor of English and Sanskrit, and scaled thereafter with the aid of the 10th Maharaja, Sir Pusapati Ananda Gajapathi Raju.

== Academic Programmes ==
The college has 21 departments offering 19 undergraduate and postgraduate courses in arts and science streams affiliated to the Andhra University. There are about 150 permanent and temporary academic and support staff members with an annual intake of about 2,192 students in 2009.

== Campus ==
The Maharajah's College is spread over 18 acres, hosting six buildings with a built-up area of 115,307 sq ft (10,712.4 m^{2}). There is a central library and 14 other departmental libraries. The central library has over 50,000 books, and various digital resource. There are seminar halls, health centre, hostels, sports facilities and a gymnasium in the campus. The Union Bank of India had its branch in the campus to cater the staff and students.

== Alumni Association ==
The Maharajah's College Old Students's Association (MRCOSA) has been functioning since the inception of college. Its organized the Maharajah Ananda Gajapati Sapada Sata Jayanti, the 125th Anniversary of Maharajah Ananda Gajapati Raju in 1976. It was revived when the college became Autonomous in 1987. It was made an integral part of the College in 1993.

== Notable alumni ==
- Allam Appa Rao, Vice Chancellor of Jawaharlal Nehru Technological University, Kakinada.
- A. L. Rao, Chief Operating Officer, Wipro
- Beela Satyanarayana, Vice Chancellor of Andhra University.
- Botsa Satyanarayana, Indian Parliamentarian.
- Bulusu Sambamurti, was an Indian lawyer, politician and freedom-fighter
- Chaganti Somayajulu, Telugu writers.
- Dronamraju Krishna Rao or Krishna R. Dronamraju, an Indian-born geneticist and president of the Foundation for Genetic Research in Houston, Texas.
- Dwaram Bhavanarayana Rao, musicologist and Principal of Maharajah's Government College of Music and Dance.
- E. Venkatesam, former Judge of Andhra Pradesh High Court
- G. Ramanujulu Naidu, former Judge of Andhra Pradesh High Court.
- Ganti Jogi Somayaji, Telugu scholar and faculty in Andhra University.
- Gidugu Venkata Ramamurthy, the father of Colloquial Telugu language movement.
- Gurazada Apparao, poet.
- Indukuri Ramakrishnam Raju, better known as Rajasri, dialogue and lyrics writer in Telugu cinema.
- J. V. Somayajulu, theater and film actor.
- K. Punnayya, former Judge of Andhra Pradesh High Court and Member of Legislative Assembly.
- Dr. K. S. R. Krishna Rao
- General K. V. Krishna Rao, former Chief of the Army Staff of the Indian Army.
- Kala Venkata Rao, freedom fighter and politician.
- Kandala Subrahmanyam, lawyer and Member of Parliament from Vizianagaram constituency.
- Kotcherlakota Rangadhama Rao, Indian Physicist.
- M. V. Narayana Rao, Chief of Crime Investigation Department.
- N. Dilip Kumar, Chief of Anti-Corruption Branch.
- P. V. Ramanaiah Raja, founder of Sri Raja-Lakshmi Foundation.
- Pappu Venugopala Rao, musicologist.
- Penmetsa Satyanarayana Raju former Chief Justice of Andhra Pradesh High Court.
- T. V. R. Tatachari, Chief Justice of Delhi High Court.
