= N. Subrahmanyam =

Indian geographer (1885-1943)

N. Subrahmanyam F.R.G.S.
- Occupations: Chair / Lecturer in Geography, College of Saidapet Founder- Secretary of the Madras Geographical Association, later renamed the Indian Geographical Society Editor-in-chief of the Madras Geographical Journal, and its successor, the Indian Geographical Journal
- Title: Recorder (Calcutta - Silver Jubilee Session, 1938) President (Lahore Session, 1939) of the Geography Section of The Indian Science Congress; Fellow of the Royal Geographical Society

Academic work
- Discipline: Geography
- Institutions: College of Saidapet

N. Subrahmanyam M.A., L.T., F.R.G.S. F.I.S.C. (born Neikuppam - near Polur, Chennai; Appaya Dikshitar; January 14, 1885 - January 29, 1943) was an Indian geographer who served as the Chair of Modern Geography at The College at Saidapet. At the Silver Jubilee section of the Indian Science Congress, the doyen of British geographers, H. J. Fleure FRS FRAI, nominated Subrahmanyam for the 1939 Presidency, which he attained, receiving especial acclaim for his address, The Geographical Person of India, soon receiving the plaudits of C. B. Fawcett and Sir Laurence Dudley Stamp CBE and establishing himself as founder-president of the Madras Geographical Association, later renamed the Indian Geographical Society, and Editor-in-chief of the Madras Geographical Journal, and its successor, the Indian Geographical Journal.

== Family ==
He was born into the Calamur family as the son of Arunalachala Dikshitar, a direct scion of Appayya Dikshita, and Balakucham, granddaughter of C. V. Runganada Sastri. His first cousin Venkataraman Sastri, who taught him mathematics and English, was Bharatikrishna Tirthaji Maharaj, Shankaracharya of Dwaraka and then Puri.
