= Ganti Jogi Somayaji =

- Born: 7 October 1900; Anakapalli, Visakhapatnam district
- Died: 12 January 1987 (aged 86)
- Citizenship: India
- Education: M.A.
- Alma mater: Maharajah's College, Vizianagaram
- Occupation: Lecturer
- Writing career
- Genre: Poet
- Notable work: Andhra Bhasha Vikasam

Ganti Jogi Somayaji M.A. (7 October 1900 – 12 January 1987) was a linguist and teacher. He was a scholar in Sanskrit, Telugu, English and other languages.

== Brief lifesketch ==
Ganti Jogi Somayaji was born in a Telugu Brahmin family at Anakapalli, Visakhapatnam district in 1900. He was graduated from Maharajah's College, Vizianagaram in 1921. He has completed L.T. and obtained Vidwan degree in Telugu and Sanskrit languages in 1926. He has obtained M. A. in Sanskrit while working in a High School at Adoni. He has joined Pachaiyappa's College as Lecturer of Sanskrit and worked for 3 years. He has joined Andhra University in 1933 as Telugu lecturer and worked there till 1963.

He died on 12 January 1987.

The Ganti Jogi Somayaji memorial lecture was instituted in his memory by Telugu Department of Andhra University. Dr. Ravi Ranga Rao gave the annual lecture on "Conciseness in Poetry" in 2010.

== Literary works ==
- Basava Charitra (1925)
- Vamsodharakudu (1927)
- Dharma Samrajyamu (1929)
- Ramachandruni Hampi Yatra (1930) : Described the glorious past of Hampi.
- Andhra Bhasha Vikasam (1947) : History of Telugu language.
- Kotta Lantarlu (1948)
- Sri Radhakrishnaprabha (1970) : The divinity in man; a poetical biographical sketch of Dr. Sarvepalli Radhakrishnan in Sanskrit, published by Bharatiya Vidya Bhavan.

== Awards ==
- He was recipient of "Kala Prapoorna" from Andhra University in 1975.
