= Ramanarayanam =

Hindu temple in Vizianagaram, Andhra Pradesh, India

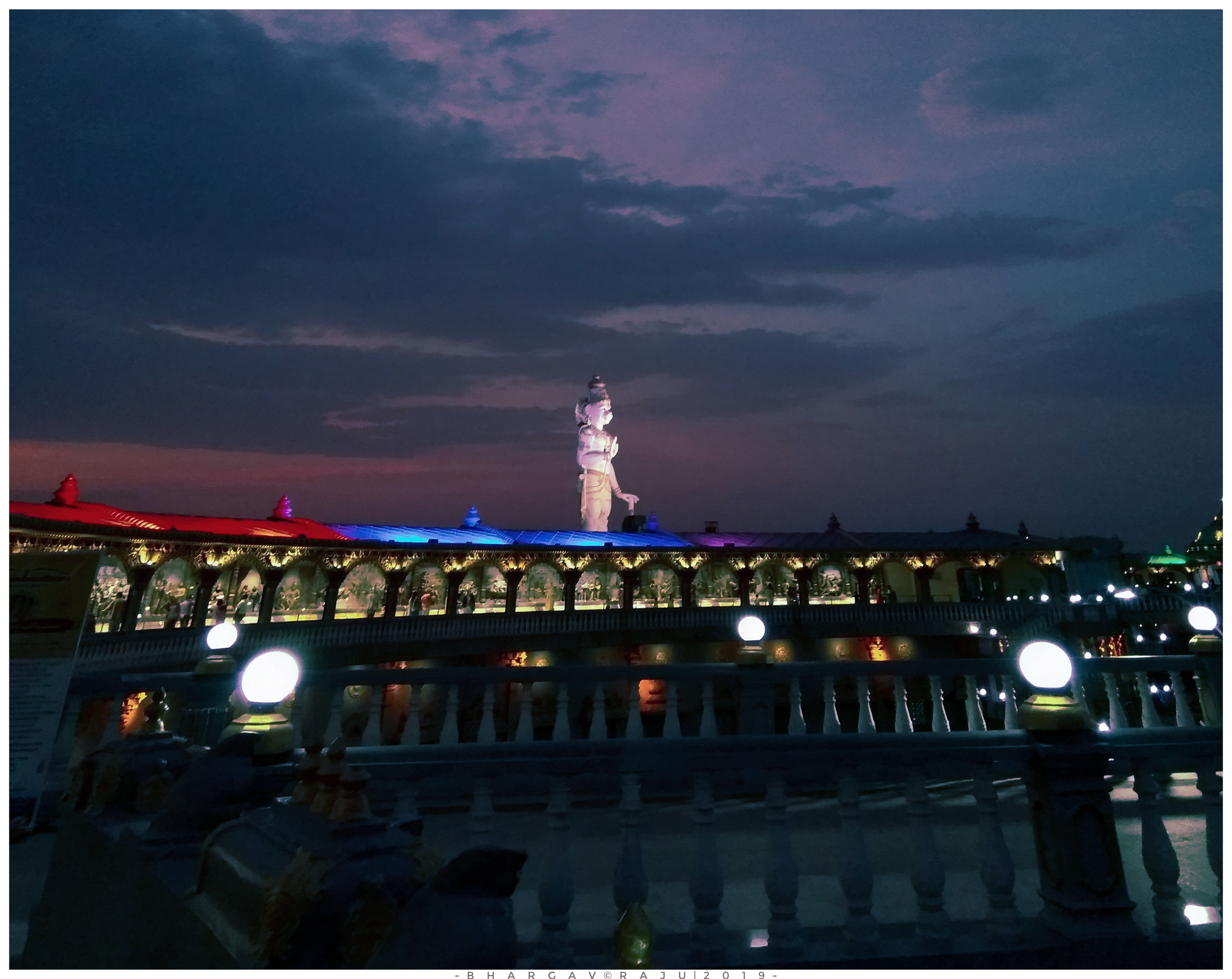
- Hanuman statue at night

Religion
- Affiliation: Hinduism
- District: Vizianagaram
- Deity: Rama

Location
- Location: Korukonda Road, Vizianagaram 535004
- State: Andhra Pradesh
- Country: India
- Interactive map of Ramanarayanam
- Coordinates: 18.074827°N 83.369559°E

Architecture
- Type: Hindu temple architecture
- Creator: NCS Charitable Trust

Website
- ramanarayanam.org

Ramanarayanam is a Hindu temple located on Korukonda Road in Vizianagaram, Andhra Pradesh, India. The temple is themed on the Ramayana and is designed in the shape of a bow and arrow. It is located 45 km from Visakhapatnam.

== History ==
The temple was constructed by the NCS Charitable Trust on a 15-acre site. The design is based on the Ramayana and is shaped like a bow and arrow. The temple has become a major tourism hub for the Uttarandhra region, attracting over 2.4 million tourists within its first 18 months of operation, making it one of the most visited places in Vizianagaram.

== Transport ==
The temple is well connected to Vizianagaram and Visakhapatnam. It is located 50 km from Visakhapatnam Airport and 15 km from the upcoming Bhogapuram Airport.

== See also ==
- Vaishnavism
