= Gurazada Srirama Murty =

Gurajada Srirama Murty (1851–1899) was Telugu writer, poet and editor. He published his book on the lives of the Telugu poets in the last decade of the nineteenth century, the trend has been set for the writing of biography in Telugu.

== Biography ==
He was born on 1851. His book "Kavi jivitamulu" is one of the earliest lives of Telugu poets. He also wrote a poetical work called "Citra Ratnakaramu" from a tale of Arabian nights. He was one of the most accomplished researches oriented scholar in the court of Ananda Gajapathi in Vizianagaram. He was the publisher of "Prabhanda kalpavalli" and "Raja yogi" journals. He published a series of historical works, known as "Vizianagaram historical Siries" with the aid and encouragement of the maharaj Ananda Gajapati.

== Books ==
- Kavi jivithamulu
- Chitra ratnkaram - A translation of Arabian nights stories
- Telugu version of Shakespeare's Merchant of Venice
- Birudavalis of the rulers of Vizianagaram and Ventkatagiri sansthanas
- Andhrapada parijatham. (Telugu dictionary)
