= Quirk Memorial Baptist Church =

- Country: India
- Denomination: Baptist
- Website: www.qmbchurch.com

History
- Former name(s): Baptist Church, Maddilapalem
- Status: Church
- Founded: 1948; 78 years ago
- Founder: Canadian Baptist Ministries

Architecture
- Functional status: Active
- Style: Postmodernism

Clergy
- Pastor: Rev. H. Prem Kumar

Quirk Memorial Baptist Church (QMB Church), founded in 1948, is a Baptist Church affiliated to the Convention of Baptist Churches of Northern Circars. The Church is located on Rama Talkies Road in Resapuvanipalem, Visakhapatnam, Andhra Pradesh (India).

The QMB Church is known among the Churches in Visakhapatnam for its proactive programmes.

== History ==
The founding of the Church is attributed to the missionary endeavour of the Canadian Baptist Ministries which embarked on an overseas missionary enterprise in 1874 through the efforts of Thomas Gabriel. The QMB Church was established in postcolonialism era in 1948 by The Reverend E. L. Quirk who founded what was originally known as the Baptist Church Maddilapalem. The old edifice was reconstructed and dedicated on 24 July 1985.

After more than twenty years, a new edifice was constructed and dedicated on May Day 2009 in the presence of the Baptist patriarchs comprising The Rev. C. L. Johnson, CBCNC, then Principal of the Baptist Theological Seminary, Kakinada and The Rev. G. Babu Rao, CBCNC, then Church Relations Coordinator of Canadian Baptist Ministries during the incumbency of the present Pastor, The Rev. G. Isaiah.

== The Pastor ==
The senior Pastor, The Rev. G. Isaiah comes with enough experience in Pastoralia and had been an aspirant at the Baptist Theological Seminary, Kakinada during the period of The Rev. S. E. Krupa Rao, CBCNC. Subsequently, the Seminary Council sent Isaiah for ministerial formation to the Andhra Christian Theological College, Hyderabad where Isaiah pursued spiritual studies during 1986-1989 during the Principalship of The Rev. S. Joseph, STBC and other Spiritual Formators including The Rev. M. Victor Paul, AELC, The Rev. Jürgen Fangmeier, The Rev. R. R. Sundara Rao, AELC, The Rev. R. Yesurathnam, CSI and The Rev. G. Dyvasirvadam, CSI. As part of the University criteria, Isaiah also submitted a dissertation entitled, The life history of Prof. M. Theophilus and his contribution to the CBCNC, fulfilling the requirements for the award of Bachelor of Divinity degree by the Senate of Serampore College (University), Serampore, West Bengal. The succeeding year, in 1990, Isaiah was awarded the B.D. degree by the University during the Registrarship of The Rev. D. S. Satyaranjan, IPC.

== Succession of Pastors ==
The QMB Church being a member of the Protestant Convention of Baptist Churches of Northern Circars, Pastors here have adequate ministerial formation at any of the affiliated seminaries of the Senate of Serampore College (University).

Succession of Pastors
Pastor G. Joseph, CBCNC
Pastor K. Prakasha Rao, CBCNC
Pastor John Victor, CBCNC
The Rev. K. Y. Krupadanam, CBCNC
The Rev. G. Peter, CBCNC
The Rev. G. Lazarus, CBCNC
The Rev. D. Daniel, CBCNC
Pastor I. John Simon, CBCNC
The Rev. G. Sanjeeva Rao, CBCNC
Pastor K. Kumar Thomas, CBCNC
Pastor G. John Peter, CBCNC
The Rev. K. Y. Krupadanam, CBCNC
Pastor G. Steven Peter, CBCNC
