= Kotcherlakota Rangadhama Rao =

Indian physicist

Prof. Kotcherlakota Rangadhama Rao
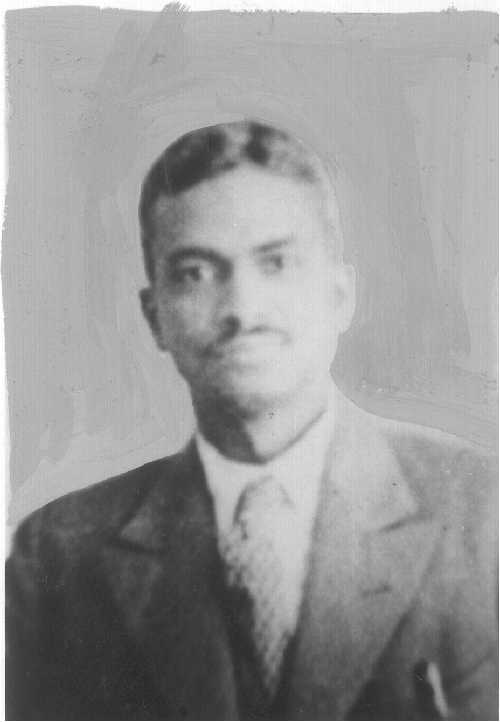
- Portrait of Prof. K. Rangadhama Rao, approx. 1920.
- Born: 9 September 1898; Vizianagaram, Andhra Pradesh
- Died: 20 June 1972 (aged 73); Visakhapatnam, Andhra Pradesh, India
- Citizenship: Indian
- Education: Andhra University, Visakhapatnam
- Known for: Spectroscopy, Nuclear Quadrupole Resonance
- Scientific career
- Fields: Physics, Spectroscopy
- Workplaces: Sri Venkateswara University, Tirupathi, University of Madras, Tamil Nadu, London University, Berlin and Sweden
- Doctoral advisor: Prof. A. Fowler

Prof. Kotcherlakota Rangadhama Rao (9 September 1898 – 20 June 1972) was an Indian physicist in the field of Spectroscopy.

Rangadhama Rao is best known for his work on spectroscopy, his role in the development of Nuclear Quadrupole Resonance (NQR), and his long association with the physics laboratories of Andhra University. In his later years, he became known for his position as the Principal of all the colleges of Andhra University before their divisions into separate colleges, viz., AU College of Arts and Commerce, AU College of Engineering, AU College of Law, AU College of Pharmacy and AU College of Science and Technology.

Rangadhama Rao was known both for his scientific ability and his interpersonal relations and volatile personality

== Early years ==
Kotcherlakota Rangadhama Rao was born in Vizianagaram, a coastal town in present-day Vizianagaram district of state of Andhra Pradesh, India, on 9 September 1898. His father, Kotcherlakota Venkata Narsing Rao was the postmaster of the present-day cities of Vizianagaram, Gajapathinagaram and Visakhapatnam, then small cities in the state of Andhra Pradesh in the Madras Presidency of British India. His mother, Ramayamma, died in 1923.

Kotcherlakota Rangadhama Rao had an arranged marriage to Vaddadi Perramma, as was the custom in the region. On 6 December 1925, when Rangadhama Rao was 27, the couple's first child, Ramakrishna Rao, was born. Rangadhama Rao and Vaddadi Perramma had seven more children, four sons and three daughters: Venkata Rao (5 February 1928); Venkata Narsing Rao (27 June 1933); Ramaleela (24 April 1938); Lakshmi Narayana (23 July 1940); Lalitha Kumari (31 July 1941); Amarnath (8 June 1944); and Vijaya Vani (19 September 1945).

== Education ==
His elementary education was at Maharaja's High School, Vizianagaram for the 3rd, 4th and 5th grades during 1904 and 1906. He joined in different schools each year in his early education. He was shifted to London Mission High School, Vizianagaram, for the 6th grade and studied 7th and 8th grades in Hindu High School at Machilipatnam. He passed his 10th grade (SSLC) in C.B.M. High School at Visakhapatnam and 12th grade (Intermediate), from Mrs. A.V.N. College at Visakhapatnam.

Prof. K. Rangadhama Rao was in the first batch of students for the B.A. degree course in 1920 (there was no B.Sc. degree course at that time in Madras University) in the Maharajah's College in Vizianagaram. The B.A Degree course was initiated by Dr. Appadvedula Lakshmi Narayan in 1918.

Prof. K.R.Rao took his M.A. in Physics from Tiruchirappalli in 1923. His research career started in 1923 when he enrolled as a Research Scholar for D.Sc. (Doctor of Science) from Madras University. He was awarded the D.Sc. Degree from Madras University and was selected for studies abroad from the Andhra University in 1928. This was a turning point in his quest for knowledge and research of his lifetime.

== Career ==
In 1924, Dr. K. Rangadhama Rao joined Dr. A.L.Narayan as a research scholar in University of Madras. Both of them worked tenaciously to build up a first rate spectroscopic laboratory second to none in the country. They had then with them a constant deviation spectrograph, a small quartz spectrograph and a medium quartz spectrograph. All these were of low dispersion and low resolving power. At this stage of their work, they required an instrument of high dispersion and high resolving power, which they could not afford. So, K.R.Rao went to Calcutta, where a ten-foot concave grating was available in the Indian Association for the Cultivation of Science of which C. V. Raman was Director and with the facilities provided there, they further extended their work on analysis of spectra in the visible and ultraviolet regions.

He was guided in his research career by Prof. A.Fowler at the Imperial College of Science and Technology, London in 1930 in Atomic Spectra for two years for which he was awarded the D.Sc. Degree from London University. In 1930, he had the opportunity of working under Prof. F.Paschen at the Physikalische Technische Reichsanstalt in Berlin for six months and under Prof. Manne Siegbahn in Upsala, Sweden on Vacuum Spectroscopy for another six months. His interest in the field of Spectroscopy was so much that he built a Vacuum Spectrograph of his design with his own expenses at Potsdam, Germany.

Prof. K.R.Rao's contribution towards physics has placed him in a high position even in his times. His contributions include development of Diatomic and Polyatomic Molecular Spectroscopy laboratory dealing with High Resolution Vibrational structure in electronic transitions, U.V.Absorption, Infrared Absorption, Raman scattering, Fluorescence and Phosphorescence and Crystal Spectra. He also reached the level of construction of microwave test benches and using these techniques he created different lines of investigations in dielectrics. He contributed to the development of Radio Frequency Spectroscopy which branched into Nuclear Quadrupole Resonance (NQR), Nuclear Magnetic Resonance (NMR) and Electron Spin Resonance (ESR) spectroscopy. In India, work on NQR was first initiated by Prof. K. Rangadhama Rao in the Physics laboratories of Andhra University.

Kotcherlakota Rangdhama Rao was the Principal of Andhra University Colleges from 1949 to 1957. He was appointed as Emeritus Professor of Physics at Andhra University (1966–72) and was special officer for the establishment of Sri Venkateswara University, Tirupathi (1954).

== Contributions ==
During his early life of work in the Physics department of Andhra University, Prof. K.R.Rao, established scholarships in his father's name, Kotcherlakota Venkata Narsinga Rao.

=== Kotcherlakota Venkata Narsinga Rao Scholarship ===
While a Reader in the Physics Department of Jeypore Vikram Deo College of Science and Technology, Rao instituted a Research Scholarship in memory of his late father.

== Honours, distinctions and awards ==
Prof. Rangadhama Rao was one of the foundation members for the AP Akademi of Sciences, nominated by the Government of Andhra Pradesh in 1963. The Indian National Science Academy frequently conducts a Memorial Lecture Award in the honour of Prof. Kotcherlakota Rangadhama Rao since its inception in 1979.

=== Prof Rangadhama Rao Memorial Lecture Award ===
Prof. Kotcherlakota Rangadhama Rao Memorial Lecture Award is given for the outstanding contributions in the subject of Spectroscopy in Physics. The award was established by the National Institute of Sciences of India, located in Calcutta in 1979.

List of Awardees

== Publications ==
Prof. K.R.Rao's research works were published in various reputed National and International Journals. Some of his initial publications are given below

- On the spectra of the metals of the aluminium sub-group, Proceedings of the Physical Society of London, Volume 37, Issue 1, pp. 259–264 (1924), doi:10.1088/1478-7814/37/1/332
- A Note on the Absorption of the Green Line of Thallium Vapour, Proc. R. Soc. Lond. 1 April 1925 107:762-765; doi:10.1098/rspa.1925.0055
- On the Fluorescence and Channelled Absorption of Bismuth at High Temperatures, Proceedings of the Royal Society of London. Series A, Containing Papers of a Mathematical and Physical Character, Vol. 107, No. 744 (1 April 1925), pp. 760–762.
- On the Resonance Radiation from Thallium Vapour, Nature 115, 534-534, (11 April 1925) | doi:10.1038/115534d0
- Proc. Indian natn. Sci. Acad., 46, A, No 5, 1980, pp. 423–434
