= Kandala Subrahmanyam =

Member of Parliament
- In office 1952–57
- Constituency: Vizianagaram

Personal details
- Born: 15 July 1920 Visakhapatnam, Madras Presidency, British India
- Died: 8 June 2018 (aged 97) Visakhapatnam, Andhra Pradesh, India
- Party: Socialist Party of India
- Spouse: Surya Kantham
- Children: 3

Kandala Subrahmanya Tilak (15 July 1920 – 8 June 2018) was an Indian lawyer and politician.

== Biography ==
He is son of Shri Seshasayi and Smt Raja Rajeswari and born at Visakhapatnam on 15 July 1920. He was educated at Maharajah's College, Vizianagaram, Benaras Hindu University and Raja Lakhamgonda Law College, Belgaum.

He led a strike involving the students of the local colleges in Vizianagaram from 9 to 27 August 1942. He was arrested on 27 August and sent to rigorous imprisonment for four months. He worked with noted leaders like Pattabhi Seetharamayya, Konda Venkatappaiah and Duggirala Gopala Krishnayya, Dr. Ram manohar Lohia, Lok nayak Jayaprakash Narayan, Dr. Ashok Mehatha, Sri Madhu Limaye, Sri and Smt Gora, Sri and Smt Asaf Ali. He was associated with Sarvodaya movement and Bhoodan movement and actively worked with Sri Vinoba Bhave and Sri Prabhakar ji.

He was actively involved in the freedom struggle from the young age. He has participated with his uncle, Kandala Sarveswar Sastry, in the Salt Satyagraha march from Vizianagaram to Visakhapatnam,

He married Shrimati Surya Kantham on 7 February 1941. They had a son and two daughters. He started as a political worker and was a member of Indian National Congress from 1939 to 1947. He was secretary of Belgaum City Students' Federation, 1944–45; joint secretary of Karnatak Provincial Students' Congress. He was a member of Andhra Pradesh Congress, 1945–46 and joint secretary of Visakhapatnam District Congress Assembly in 1945–46. He joined the Socialist Party of India and worked as secretary of Visakhapatnam District Socialist Party, 1947–51 and secretary of Andhra Socialist Party, 1951–52.

He was elected to the 1st Lok Sabha from Vizianagaram constituency in 1952.

For a brief period he was asst. Diwan to Sri PVG Raju From 1958 to 1977, he was associated with MANSAS (Maharajah Alak Narayan Society of Arts and Sciences) as its manager and CEO. In 1977, he was selected and appointed chairman of the Railway Service Commission, Southern Zone. On initiating South central zone of Railway Service Commission at Secunderabad, he was made its first chairman in 1978, in which capacity he worked up to 1980.

In 1980, he was associated with OASIS as its president. In 1981, he was associated with Bhagavathula Charitis trust as its president.

From 1982 to 1997 he was associated with SPANDANA a rural development trust at Pedamallapuram as its founder president. In 1997 Shri Tilak was awarded KALAAPRAPOORNA by Andhra University for his meritorious social work. Since 1997 he has retired from most of the activities to look after his ailing wife, who became completely blind and immobile. He spent his retired life along with his wife Smt. Kantham, who died on 27 May 2015. He was confined to his room due to old age and was staying with his Son Ashok and Daughter-in-law Smt. Indiramani. He has two daughters, Smt Aruna who lives in Hyderabad along with her husband Vijaykumar and Smt Amala, who lives in Simhachalam. Sri Tilak lived in Akkayyapalem, Visakhapatnam with his son and daughter-in-law.

He died on 8 June 2018 in Visakhapatnam. As per the wish expressed by Sri Tilak, the mortal body of Sri Kandala Subrahmanya Tilak was donated to Gayathri Vidya Purishad college of medical sciences for anatomical research.
