= Chaganti Somayajulu =

Indian writer

Chaganti Somayajulu (17 January 1915 – 2 January 1994), popularly known as CHASO, was a short-story writer in 20th century Telugu literature. His nickname, "CHASO," is a portmanteau of the syllables from his name ('CHA' from Chaganti and 'SO' from Somayajulu). He was a Humanist who became a committed Marxist, and wrote extensively in support of progressive values and the marginalized.

He was born at Srikakulam to Kanukolanu Lakshminarayana Sarma and Thulasamma. He was named as Narahari Rao and brought up by his biological parents till the age of 13. He had his primary and middle school education at Municipal High School, Srikakulam, Andhra Pradesh. Then he was adopted by Chaganti Bapiraju and Thulasamma and renamed as Somayajulu. He came to Vizianagaram with his adoptive parents and studied at Municipal High School, Vizianagaram and at Maharajah's College, Vizianagaram.

His first story Chinnaji was published in Bharathi in 1942. Subsequently, he wrote many short stories and poetry. Many of his short stories have been translated into other languages. Compilation of his short stories were published in 1968. He compiled short stories of some important writers as Kalinga Kadhanikalu during his 70th birth anniversary.

He influenced many people and friends such as Srirangam Srinivasa Rao, Srirangam Narayana Babu and Acharya Ronanki Appalaswamy.

He was a longtime member and president of the Progressive Writers' Association of Andhra Pradesh.

He was married to Annapurnamma (1915-2010). His children were Ammaji (1932-1964), Chinnaji (Chaganti Tulasi, a well-known writer in Telugu), Bapiraju (1939-), Srinivas (1941–42), Krishna Kumari (Noted popular science writer (1947-) and Sankar (noted short story writer and Municipal Commissioner (1952-1996).

He died of throat cancer on 2 January 1994 at the age of 79 in Madras. As per his wish, his family members donated his eyes and body to Sri Ramachandra Medical College and Research Institute for research purposes.

== Books ==
Chinnaji Kathalu (1943)

Chaso Kathalu, Visalandhra Publishing House, Hyderabad

Chaso Kavithalu - Visalandhra Publishing House, Hyderabad

Merugu - One act play

His short stories are translated into English and published as "Chaso - Selected short stories" by Sahitya Academy in 2014. Some of his stories are translated into English by Velcheru Narayana Rao and David Schulman for Penguin Classics (A Doll's Wedding and Other Stories).

== Some of Chaso's famous stories ==
- Kunkudaaku
- Bondu Mallelu'
- Chokka Bochuthuvvalu
- Chinnaji
- Dummalagondi
- Empu
- Kukkuteshwaram
- Enduku Paresthanu Nanna
- Oohaa voorvasi
- Parabrahmam
- Vaayuleenam
- Eloorellali

== Chaso Foundation ==
One of his daughters, Chaganti Tulasi, established the Chaso Foundation in 1995 and awards the "Chaganti Somayajulu (Chaso) Memorial Literary Award" to progressive writers every year on Chaso's birthday, January 17th.
