= Vasireddy Sri Krishna =

Indian economist and academic

Vasireddy Sri Krishna shortly V. S. Krishna (8 October 1902 – 16 February 1961), was an educationist and economist. He was the Vice Chancellor of Andhra University in Visakhapatnam, India.

== Early life and education ==
Krishna was born to Sriramulu and Veeramma at Pedapalem village in Tenali taluk in Andhra Pradesh, India. He studied in Oxford University, London in Economics and obtained his B.A. in 1929. He did his Ph.D. from Vienna University.

== Career ==
He joined Andhra University in 1932 as lecturer in economics. He Ph.D. from Vienna University was on gold standardization. Later, he joined back in the university as Warden, Registrar and head of newly established Economics department.

In 1949, he was elected as Vice chancellor by the university senate. He held this position for 11 years till 1961 and worked hard in the various developmental activities of the university. He developed the university library which was later named as Dr. V. S. Krishna Library.

In 1957, he was elected as president of Inter University Board of India. He was the fifth chairman of University Grants Commission (India) in 1961 and died during the same period.

In 1968, a government degree college was started in Visakhapatnam in his name. Dr V. S. Krishna Government Degree College is an autonomous institution affiliated to Andhra University offers both graduate and post graduate courses.
