= Yadla Gopalarao =

Indian theatre artist (born 1950)

Yadla Gopalarao (born 4 May 1950) is an Indian theatre artist. He was conferred with Padma Shri, India's fourth-highest civilian award, in arts in 2020. He is known for his role as "Nakshtraka" in Satya Harishchandra. He performed in about 5,600 plays.

== Early life ==
Yadla Gopalarao was born on 4 May 1950 to Yadla Rammorthi and Lakshmamma in Mandarada village of Srikakulam district, Andhra Pradesh. He was schooled in Mandarada and completed pre-university course in Government College, Srikakulam.

== Career ==
Gopalarao debuted in theatre in 1964 with the social-play Desamkosam (transl. For the country). He later performed in Pavala, "Aagandi, Konchem Aalochinchandi", Pularangadu, Chillarakottu Chittemma, Palle Paduchu, President Pattayya, Ramanjaneya Yudham, Sri Krishna Tulabharam, Narada Garvabhangam, Chintamani, Kurukshetram, Gayopakhyanam, Satya Harishchandra among others. His most notable work is the role "Nakshtraka" that he played in Satya Harishchandra which he played in about 3,600 performances. In total, he performed in about 5,600 plays.

== Awards ==
The Government of India has conferred Rao with Padma Shri award, India's fourth-highest civilian award, in arts for the year 2020.
