= A. L. Rao =

Bengaluru businessperson

A. Lakshman Rao is the former chief operating officer of Wipro Technologies. Rao joined Wipro's Information Technology business as a founder member in 1980 and contributed significantly towards building a R&D team. From 1993 to 1996, he worked as Vice President (Technical) at Wipro Systems and played an important role in building competence in Client/Server and Object technologies. During this period, he was instrumental in building a number of business practices from scratch. Testing services, business intelligence, data warehousing and e-Enabling are some of them. As group vice president and chief technology officer of Wipro from 1996 to 1999, he implemented ISO 9000 compliant quality processes across the Software Divisions of Infotech Group. He has also driven the SEI CMM initiative enabling Wipro to become the first SEI CMM Level 5 Software Services Company in the world. In Oct 2000, Rao took over the leadership of Telecom and Internetworking Solutions Division and steered the business through multifold growth to its present prominent position.

In June 2005, the then CEO of Wipro Technologies, Vivek Paul quit, and Rao was appointed the COO. From June 2005 to September 2008 he worked as the chief operating officer, with the responsibility for Product Engineering business(about one Billion Dollar revenues), CIO & CTO functions, Admin & Facilities and Japan & China Geographies sales & Operations. A L Rao also worked as an Advisor to Wipro Technologies from October 2008 to September 2009. In September 2009, Rao retired from Wipro after 29 years of service. He is currently an independent advisor to a few IT services companies. On 9 June 2011, A L Rao joined Trianz board of directors.

Prior to Wipro, he worked in Electronics Corporation of India Ltd. from 1973 to 1980 and was associated with the development of operating systems and compilers for ECIL computers. Rao has delivered the keynote speech at the 2nd World Congress on Software Quality in Japan in 2000. He was also a guest speaker at the Project Management Conferences held in Japan and the US. He has been elected a Fellow of the Indian National Academy of Engineering for distinguished contribution to Computer Science & Engineering. Rao did his MSc and PhD (in Nuclear Physics) from Andhra University, India.
