= Mukkamala, Konaseema district =

Mukkamala
- Village
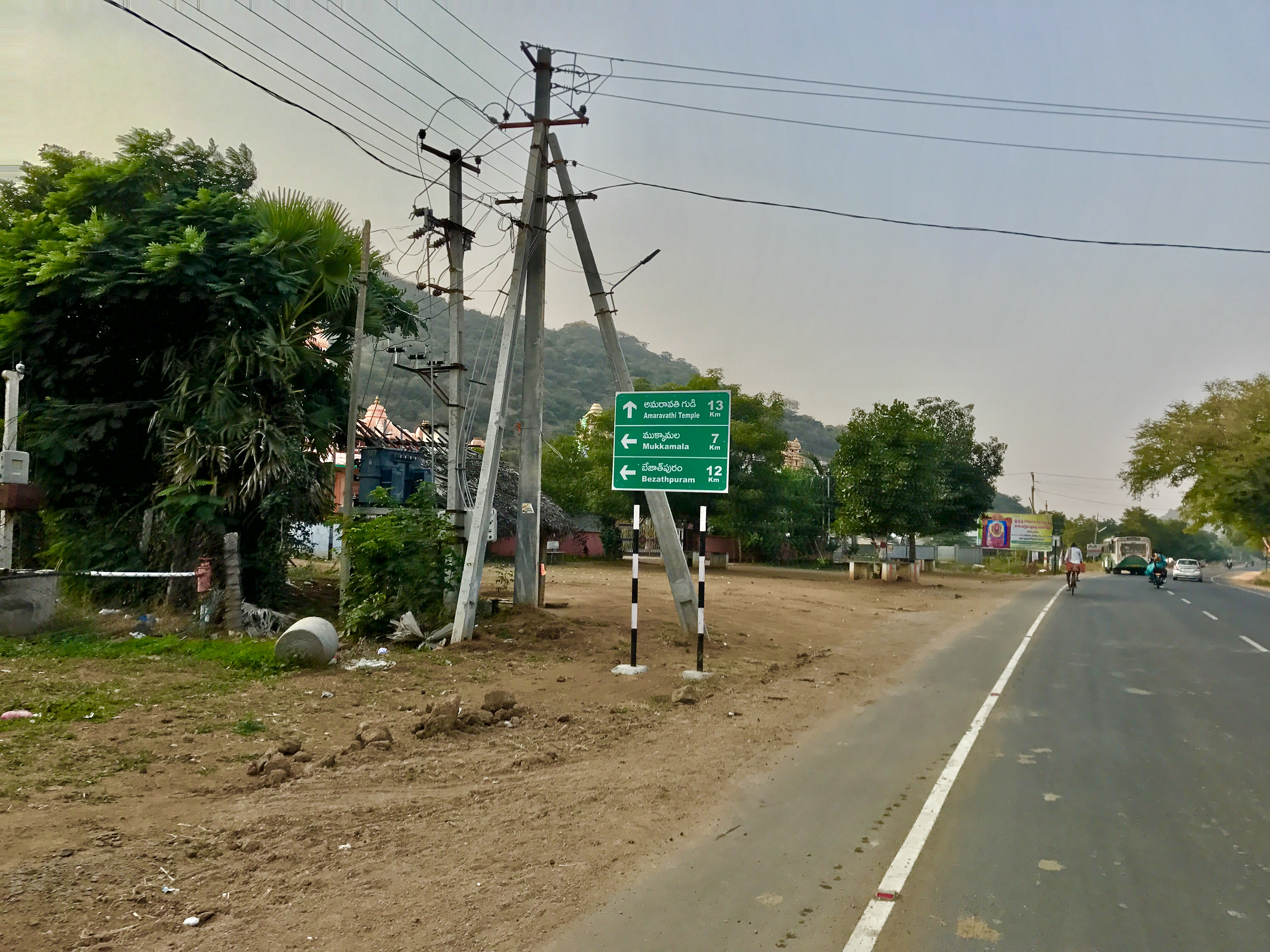
- Board_showing_Mukkamala_village
- Interactive map of Mukkamala
- Coordinates: 16°35′38″N 81°56′46″E
- Country: India
- State: Andhra Pradesh
- District: Konaseema

Population (2001)
  - Total: 2,359

Languages
  - Official: Telugu
- Time zone: UTC+5:30 (IST)
- PIN: 533241

Mukkamala is a village in Ambajipeta mandal of Konaseema district, Andhra Pradesh, India.

Eminent Astrophysicist Appadvedula Lakshmi Narayan, known as A. L. Narayan was born in this village.

== Demographics ==
The local language is Telugu. The area is 147 hectares (360 acres).

According to Indian census, 2001, the demographic details is as follows:

- Total population: 2,359 in 560 Households.
- Male population: 1,189
- Female population: 1,170
- Children under six-years: 254
  - Boys – 125
  - Girls – 129
- Total literates: 1,588
