= E. L. Quirk =

The Reverend E. L. Quirk CBM
- Born: Eric Lawrence Quirk; January 6, 1898; Ontario, Canada
- Died: August 1, 1967 (aged 69); Ontario, Canada
- Education: 1914, B.A.
- Alma mater: McMaster University, (Canada)
- Occupation(s): Ecclesiastical Administrator and Pastor
- Years active: 1925–1966
- Religion: Christianity
- Church: Canadian Baptist Ministries
- Ordained: 8 September 1925
- Congregations served: Ebenezer/Renforth Baptist Church, Etobicoke (Canada) (1921, 1924-25), Emmanuel Baptist Church, Belleville (Canada) (1962–1975)
- Offices held: Teacher, Toronto (Canada), Missionary, Kakinada, Visakhapatnam (India) (1925–1953)
- Title: The Reverend

E. L. Quirk (born 6 January 1898; died 1 August 1967;) was a Missionary who served in India from 1925 through 1953.

Quirk came to India in 1925 as a Missionary of the Canadian Baptist Mission and served on the teaching staff of the CBM-McLaurin High School, Kakinada. Quirk continued to serve in India in spite of World War II and was based at Kakinada looking after the educational endeavours of the Canadian Baptist Ministries.

Quirk's contribution to pastoral ministry was manifold as he helped establish Churches in Visakhapatnam and Kothavalasa in the areas of,

- Allipuram,
- Chengalraopet,
- Gopalapatnam,
- Kancharapalem,
- Maddilapalem,
- Malkapuram,
- Scindia colony,
- Kothavalasa

Religious titles
Preceded by Position created	Pastor, Emmanuel Baptist Church, Belleville (Canada); 1962–1966	Succeeded by Rev. Charles Savage; 1966–1974
