= Pusapati Ananda Gajapati Raju =

Maharaja of Vizianagaram (1850 – 1897)

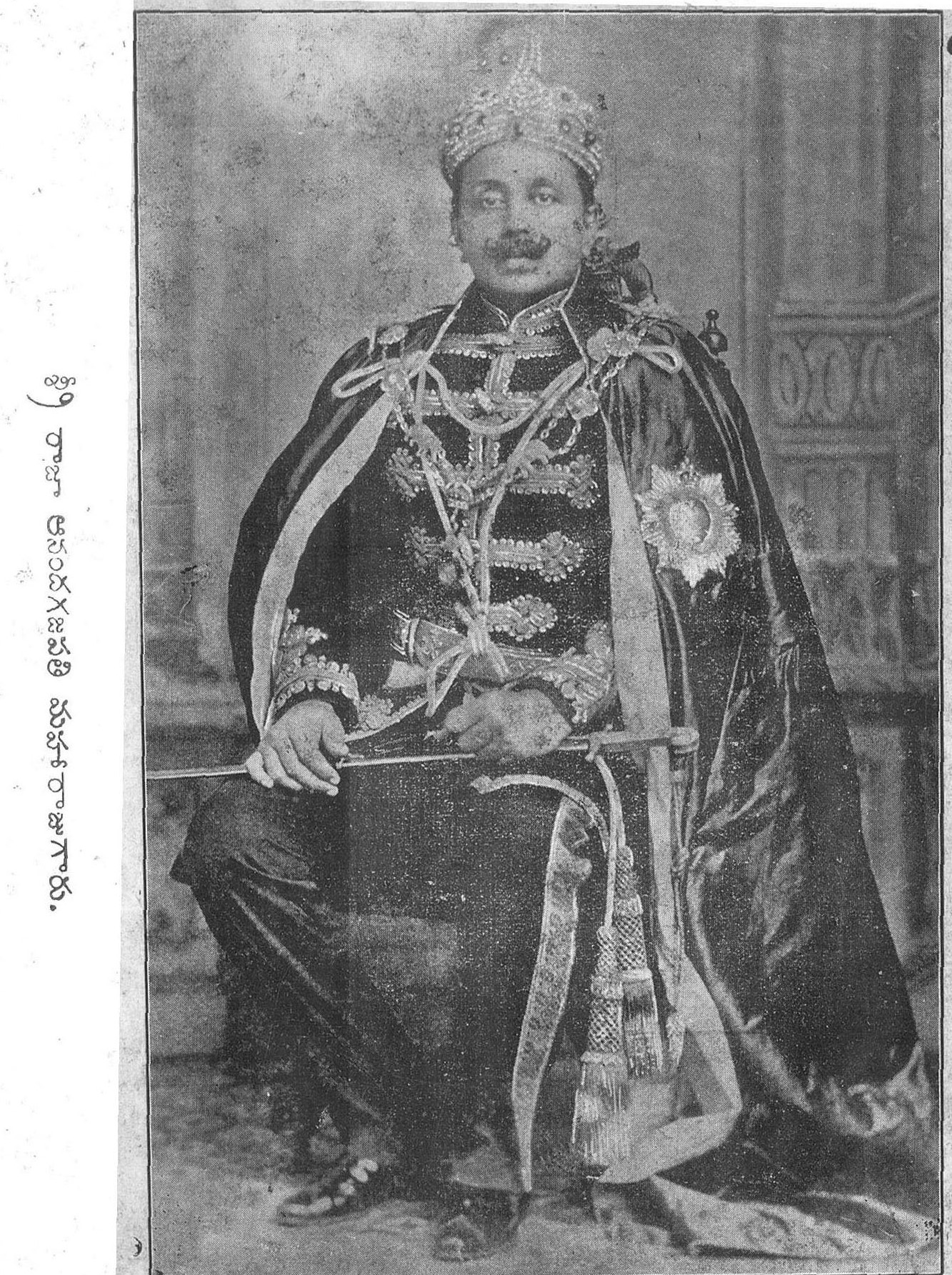
Pusapati Ananda Gajapati Raju

Raja Anand Gajapathi Maharaju (1850 – 1897) was a king from the Gajapathi dynasty who controlled portions of present-day Andhra Pradesh and Odisha in India. He is known for his contributions to the socioeconomic and cultural advancement of his reign.

== Family ==
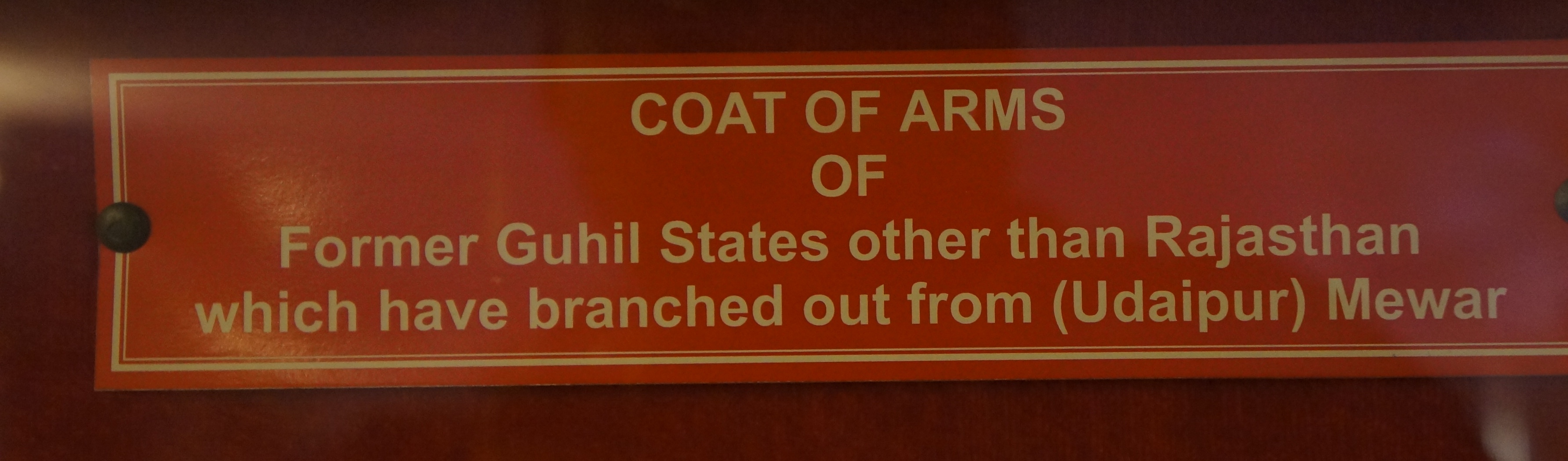
Mewar Coat of Arms

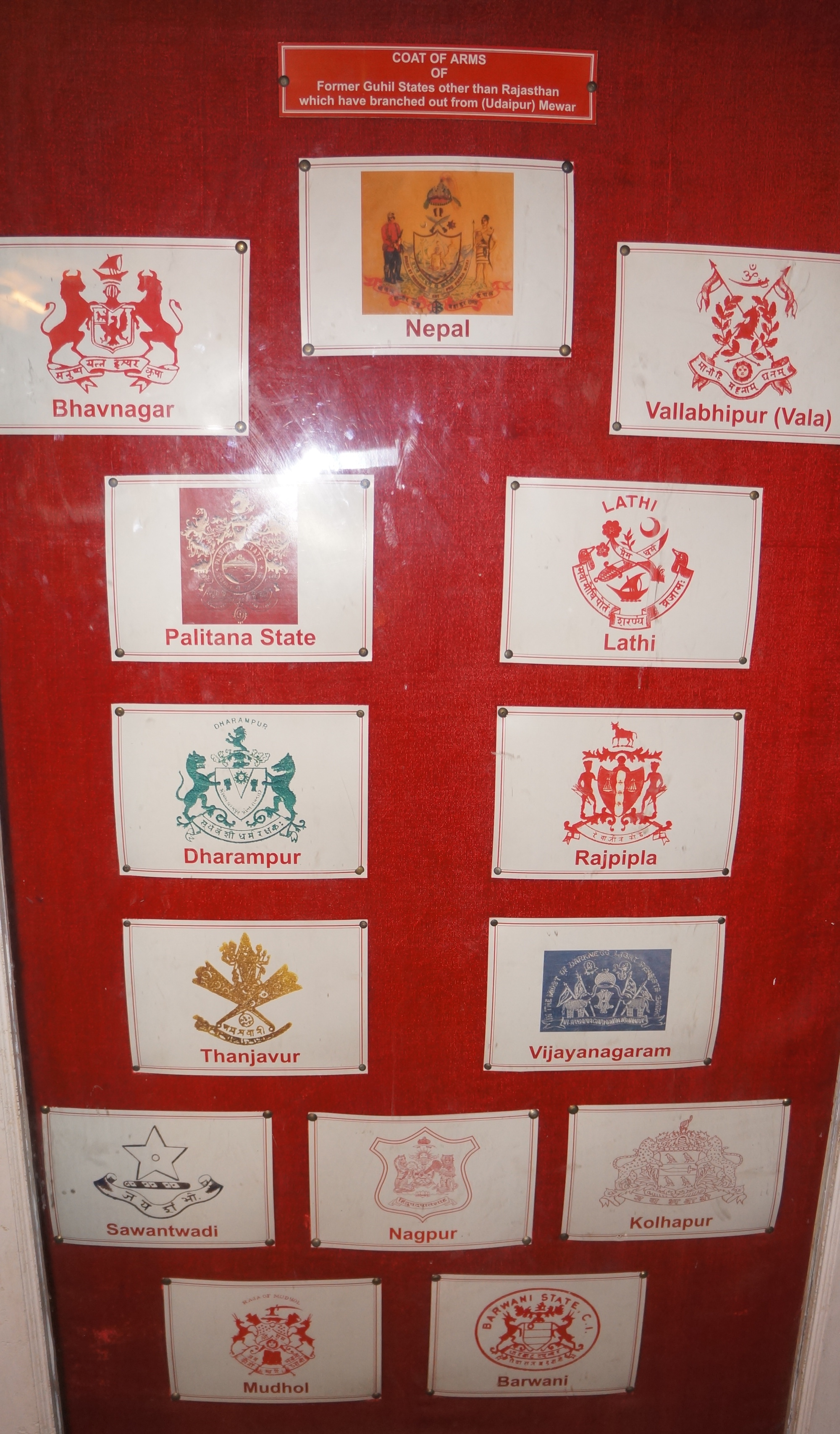
Branches of the Sisodia Clan

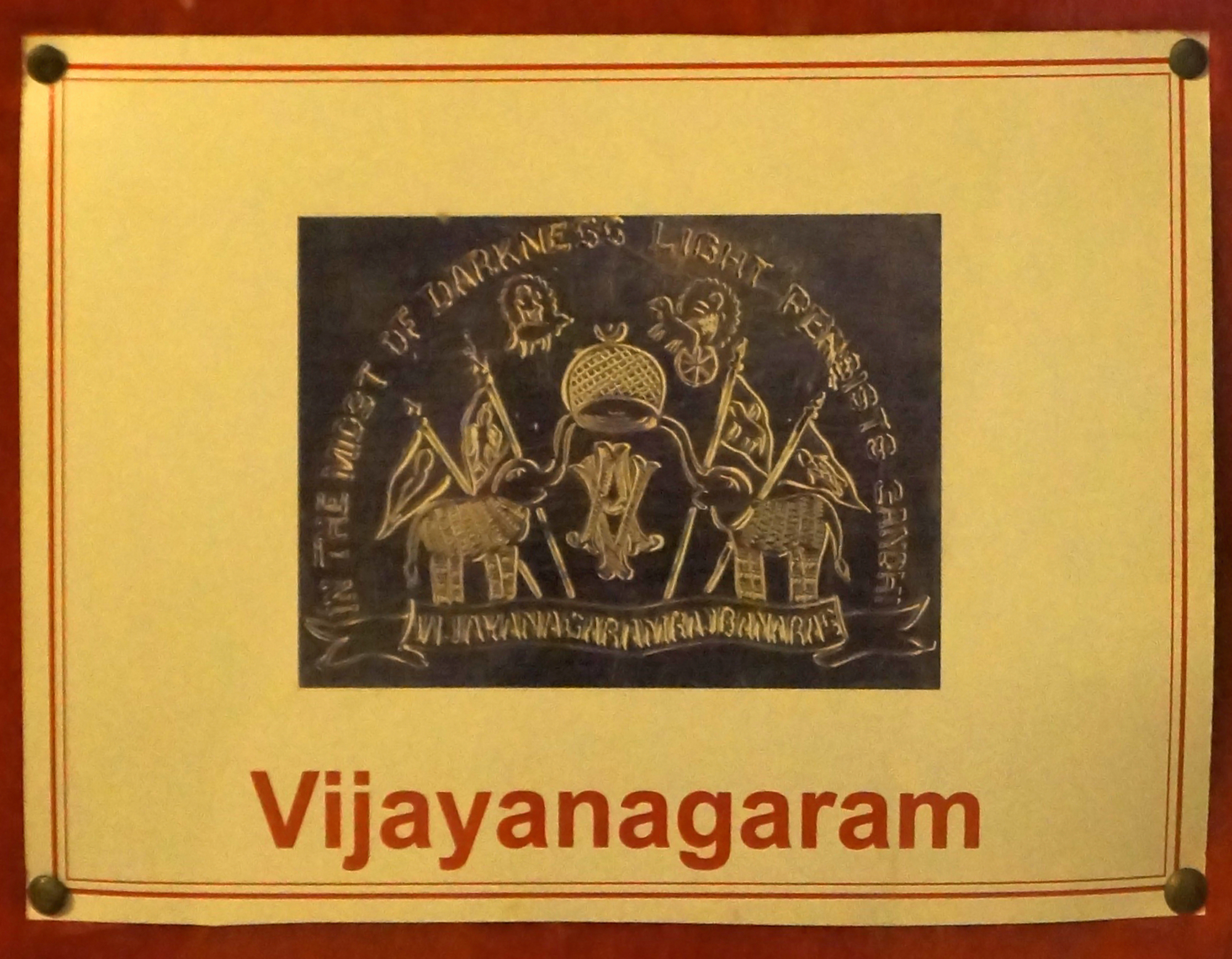
Coat of Arms of Vijayanagaram

The House of Pusapati claims descent from the Rajput Sisodia dynasty of Mewar. According to Edward B. Eastwick, Ananda Gajapati Raju is a descendant of the Gahlot clan and of the Vasishtha gotra.

Ananda Gajapati was the second of three children born to Maharajah Vijayarama Gajapati Raju. Narayana Gajapati (10 February 1850 – 29 September 1863) was his elder brother and Appala Kondayamba (16 February 1859 – 14 December 1912) was his younger sister. She married Maharaj Kumar Singh, cousin and heir apparent of H.H. Maharajah of Rewah.

In 1817, Ananda Gajapati Raju's father handed over part of his estate to the Madras Presidency to clear a debt of ₹200,000 (equivalent to ₹140 million or $1.7 million in 2023). In 1827, he handed over his estate again and died in Banaras, leaving a debt of ₹1,100,000 (equivalent to ₹740 million or $8.9 million in 2023). His successor, Maharajah Vijayarama Gajapati Raju III, was recognized in his father's room in 1845. He had several honours conferred on him by the British Raj. Lord Northbrook, and obtained the title of 'His Highness'. His name was enrolled among the chiefs entitled to return visits from the Viceroy, and he was also cleared of his debt.

== Noble scion of a Noble house ==
Ananda Gajapati learned Sanskrit under the guidance of eminent scholars, including Bhagavathula Hari Sastry, Mysore Bhimacharyulu, and Mudumbai Narasimha Swamy. Major Thomson and Lingam Lakshmoji taught him English. He was proficient in Latin and French.

During the rule of Maharajah Ananda Gajapati, education, literature, and music received support, and Telugu culture thrived. Ananda Gajapati Raju was granted the personal title of 'Maharajah.' He was a Member of the Madras Legislative Council for many years and created a G.C.I.E. in 1892.

== Abhinava Andhra Bhoja ==
Maharajah Ananda Gajapati is acclaimed throughout the Telugu-speaking world Abhinava Andhra Boja. He worked to make Vizianagaram a center of learning, a Banaras in Andhra Desa.

Satavadhani Chellapilla wrote and published an essay in Krishna Patrika in 1941 about the Vizianagaram Samsthanam. Ananda Gajapati revered tradition. His court was a meeting place for people of varied attainments. His patronage of scholars, poets, literature, and artists is comparable to Krishna Deva Raya of Hampi Vijayanagaram. The Diggajas of Maharajah Ananda Gajapati's court are Mudumbai Narasimachari, Varaha Narasimha, Kolluru Kama Sastri, the poet, Peri Venkata Sastri, the master of Shastras and his son Peri Kasinadha Sastri. He assigned them projects and commissioned the translation of Dharma Sastras.

He gave financial support of a lakh rupees to Max Müller for his translational work of Rig Veda.

Poona Gayani Samaj was a society founded to promote classical music, mainly Hindusthani music, on 13 September 1894. It was heavily funded by Ananda Gajapati Raju, who helped fund the publication of Gayala Siddanjanam and Swara Manjari written by the Tachchuri Singracharya brothers of Madras. Ananda Gajapati had in his court an Italian Band set consisting of 48 players and a Shehnai troupe with twelve players. He is said to have tutored the eminent Veena Venkata Ramana.

Reputed actors and stage artists were part of his court. Jagannadha Vilasini was a dramatic society started during his father's reign in 1874 and gave performances in Sanskrit and Telugu at Pithapuram and Madras. The chief of the actors was Butchi Sastry and the society was also referred to as the 'Butchi Sastry Troupe'. Ananda Gajapati invited Gomatham Srinivasa Charyulu, known as Indian Garrick to his court and patronized the play Harischandra he wrote in English.

The Maharajah had a forward-looking temperament and progressive views, and initiated social reform. Gurajada Appa Rao who wrote the play Kanyasulkam dedicated it to the Maharajah. The writer states in his preface to the first edition that the Maharajah inaugurated an epoch in the history of Telugu Literature.

Gurazada Srirama Murty was a research-oriented scholar in the court of Vizianagaram.

== The Historiographer ==
Vizianagaram Treaty of 15 November 1758 and the end of 15 years of war between the English and the French for the sovereignty of India from 1744 to 1759 A.D. was the work of a historiographer. Ananda Gajapati Raju composed it and had it printed by Vest and Company, Madras in 1894. He quoted from historical sources, the chief of which was The History of the Rise and Progress of the Bengal Army. He collected data from more than forty scholars, historians, poets, and documenters; some of the most important are Orme, Broome, Cambridge, Carmichael, Gleiig, Taylor and Adams, Pusapati Vijayarama Raju, Meer Alum, Megasthenes, and Huen Tsang.
