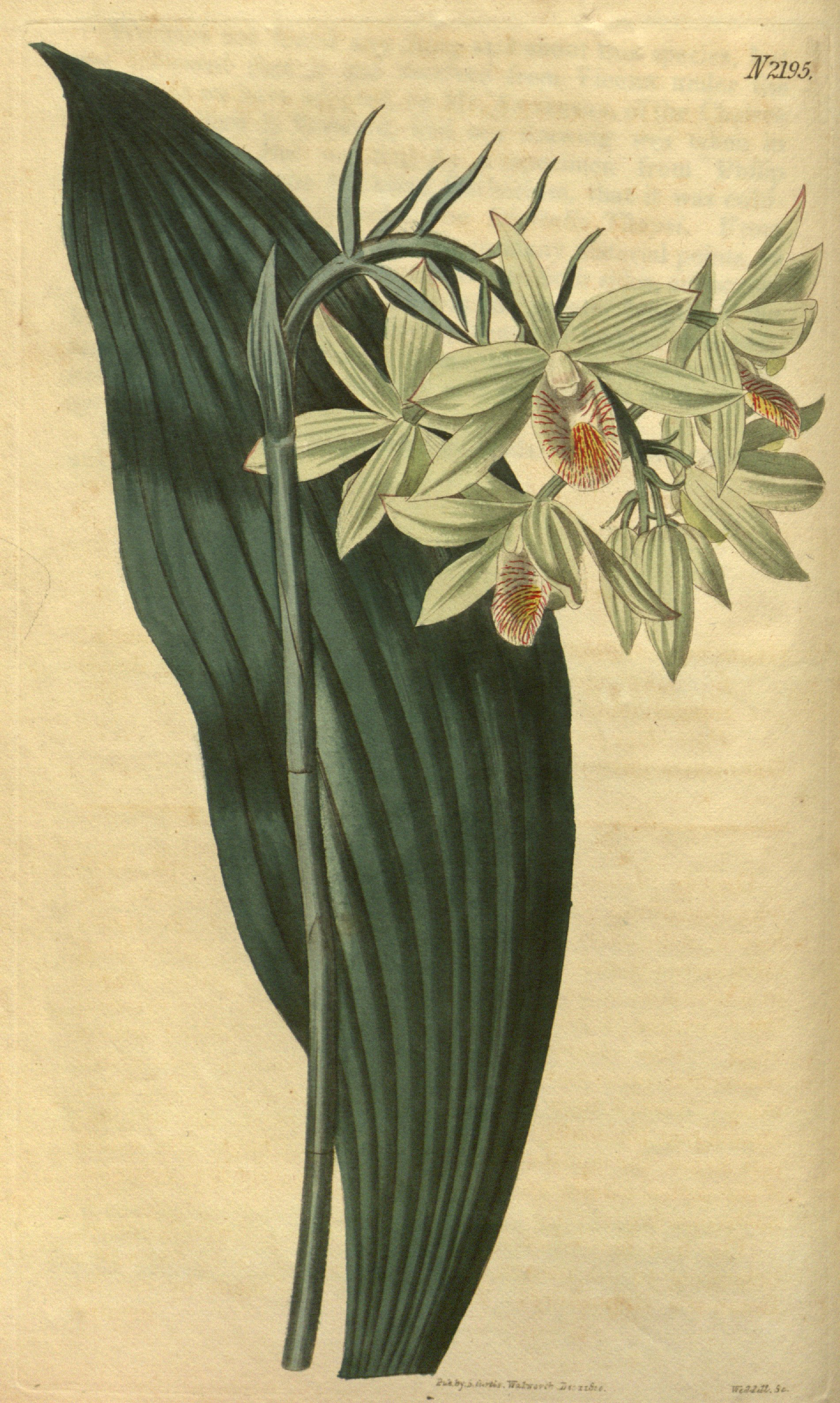
- Geodorum terrestre (type species)

Scientific classification
- Kingdom: Plantae
- Clade: Tracheophytes
- Clade: Angiosperms
- Clade: Monocots
- Order: Asparagales
- Family: Orchidaceae
- Subfamily: Epidendroideae
- Tribe: Cymbidieae
- Subtribe: Eulophiinae
- Genus: Geodorum; Jacks.

Synonyms
- Otandra Salisb.; Cistella Blume; Ortmannia Opiz

= Geodorum =

Shepherds' crooks

Genus of orchids

Geodorum, commonly known as shepherds' crooks or 地宝兰属 (di bao lan shu), is a genus of eight species of flowering plants in the orchid family, Orchidaceae. They are deciduous, terrestrial herbs with underground pseudobulbs, broad, pleated leaves and small to medium-sized, tube-shaped or bell-shaped flowers on a flowering stem with a drooping end. Species in this genus are found in southern Japan, tropical Asia, Australia and islands of the southwest Pacific Ocean.

== Description ==
Orchids in the genus Geodorum are deciduous, terrestrial herbs with pseudobulbs underground but close to the surface. There are several pleated leaves emerging from the pseudobulb, the largest at the top. Each leaf has a stalk which wraps around those below it. The flower stalk also emerges from the pseudobulb and bears a few to many bell-shaped or tubular flowers. The sepals and petals are similar in size and shape and do not spread widely apart from each other, so that the flowers do not open widely. The portion of the flowering stem carrying flowers droops, so that although the flowers are non-resupinate, the labellum is the lowest part of the flower. The labellum has three lobes but lacks the spur or pouch of orchids in the similar genus Eulophia.

== Taxonomy and naming ==
The first formal description of Geodorum appeared in The Botanist's Repository for New, and Rare Plants edited by Henry Cranke Andrews. There is a description and an illustration of Geodorum citrinum, now known as Geodorum terrestre. The illustration was the work of Andrews but although not recognised in the book, the description is believed to be the work of George Jackson. The name Geodorum is derived from the Ancient Greek words ge meaning "earth" and doron meaning "leaf", apparently referring to the terrestrial habit of orchids in this genus.

== Species ==
Species accepted by the World Checklist of Selected Plant Families as of October 2018 are:

- Geodorum attenuatum Griff. - Laos, Myanmar, Thailand, Vietnam, Hainan, Yunnan
- Geodorum densiflorum (Lam.) Schltr. - Tropical and subtropical Asia to the western Pacific
- Geodorum duperreanum Pierre - Vietnam
- Geodorum eulophioides Schltr. - Guizhou, Myanmar
- Geodorum laxiflorum Griff. - Assam, Orissa, Chhattisgarh
- Geodorum recurvum (Roxb.) Alston in Trimen - India, Assam, Cambodia, Myanmar, Thailand, Vietnam, Guangdong, Hainan, Yunnan
- Geodorum siamense Rolfe ex Downie - Thailand, Myanmar, Vietnam, Cambodia
- Geodorum terrestre (L.) Garay - Bangladesh, Thailand, Cambodia, Peninsular Malaysia, Australia

== Distribution ==
Orchids in this genus are found in India, Southeast Asia including Malaysia, the Philippines and Indonesia. There are two species endemic to China and others occur in New Guinea and New Caledonia. One species (Geodorum terrestre) occurs in Western Australia, the Northern Territory, Queensland and New South Wales.

== See also ==
- List of Orchidaceae genera
