= Sirari (disambiguation) =

Sirari may refer to:

- Sirari, a town in northern Tanzania
- Sirari, Bihar, a village in Sheikhpura district of Bihar, India
- Sirari (got), a got (subclan) among the Punjabi Mahtam
- Sirari (tree), a South American hardwood

== See also ==
- Ari Gold (musician) known as "Sir Ari"
