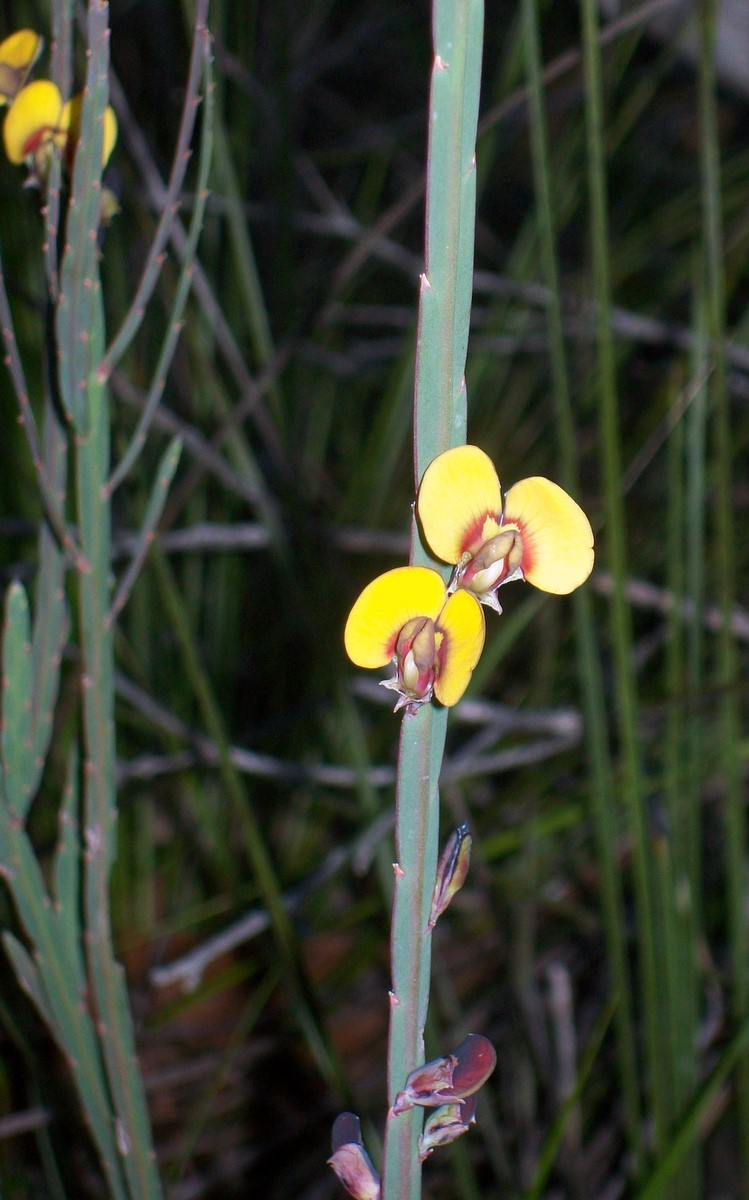
- In Ku-ring-gai Chase National Park

Scientific classification
- Kingdom: Plantae
- Clade: Tracheophytes
- Clade: Angiosperms
- Clade: Eudicots
- Clade: Rosids
- Order: Fabales
- Family: Fabaceae
- Subfamily: Faboideae
- Genus: Bossiaea
- Species: B. scolopendria

Binomial name
- Bossiaea scolopendria (Andrews) Sm.
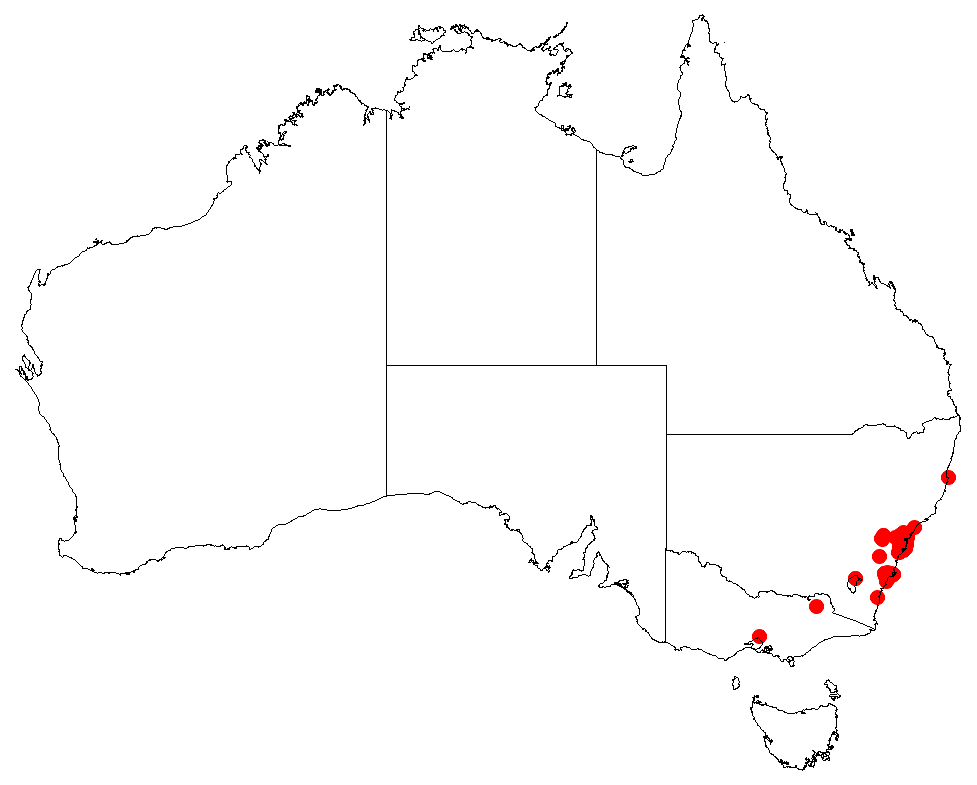
- Occurrence data from AVH

= Bossiaea scolopendria =

Plank plant

Species of legume

Bossiaea scolopendria, commonly known as plank plant or centipede pea, is a species of flowering plant in the family Fabaceae and is endemic to coastal regions of New South Wales. It is an erect, sparsely branched shrub with flattened branches ending in winged cladodes, scale leaves, and yellow and red flowers.

== Description ==
Bossiaea scolopendria is an erect, sparsely branched shrub that typically grows to a height of up to 1.5 m (4 ft 11 in) or more. The branches are flattened and end in winged cladodes 6–15 mm (0.24–0.59 in) wide. Leaves are only present on young growth and are soon replaced by scales 1–2 mm (0.039–0.079 in) long and 0.4–0.6 mm (0.016–0.024 in) wide. The flowers are borne in up to thirty nodes on the sides of cladodes, each flower 10–14 mm (0.39–0.55 in) long on a pedicel 1–3 mm (0.039–0.118 in) long. There are two scales and one or a few bracts 1.5–2.5 mm (0.059–0.098 in) long at the base and bracteoles about 1.5–2.5 mm (0.059–0.098 in) long near the middle of the pedicel. The five sepals are 4–6 mm (0.16–0.24 in) long and joined at the base forming a tube, the upper lobes 2–3 mm (0.079–0.118 in) long and 1.0–1.5 mm (0.039–0.059 in) wide, the lower lobes 1.5–2.5 mm (0.059–0.098 in) long. The standard petal is yellow with a red base and up to about 15 mm (0.59 in) long, the wings are purplish brown and 3–4 mm (0.12–0.16 in) wide, and the keel is pale greenish yellow and 3–4 mm (0.12–0.16 in) wide. Flowering mainly occurs from August to September and the fruit is an oblong pod 30–45 mm (1.2–1.8 in) long.

== Taxonomy ==
Plank plant was first formally described in 1801 by Henry Cranke Andrews who gave it the name Platylobium scolopendrium in his book, The Botanist's Repository for New, and Rare Plants. In 1808, James Edward Smith changed the name to Bossiaea scolopendria in Transactions of the Linnean Society of London.

== Distribution and habitat ==
Bossiaea scolopendria grows in heathland and forest on sandstone in near-coastal areas of New South Wales between Jervis Bay and Somersby, but is more common north of Sydney.
