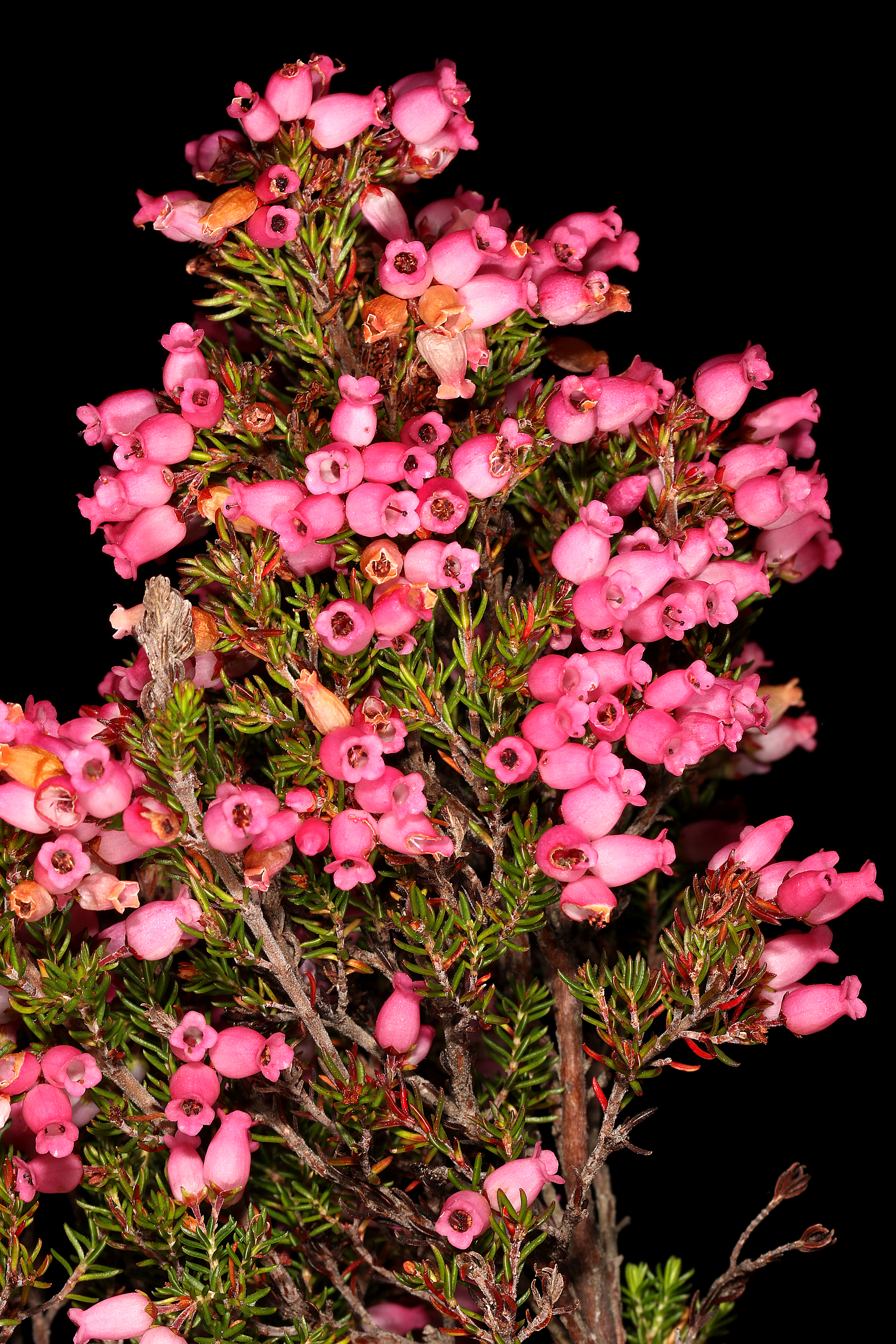

Scientific classification
- Kingdom: Plantae
- Clade: Tracheophytes
- Clade: Angiosperms
- Clade: Eudicots
- Clade: Asterids
- Order: Ericales
- Family: Ericaceae
- Genus: Erica
- Species: E. tenella

Binomial name
- Erica tenella Andrews

Synonyms
- Erica kennedyana Klotzsch; Erica lactea Less. ex Klotzsch; Erica lactiflora G.Lodd. ex Sinclair; Erica umbellifera J.C.Wendl.; Ericoides lactiflorum(G.Lodd. ex Sinclair) Kuntze; Ericoides tenellum (Andrews) Kuntze

= Erica tenella =

Species of flowering plant

Erica tenella, the tender heath, is a plant belonging to the genus Erica. The species is endemic to the Western Cape and is part of the fynbos.
