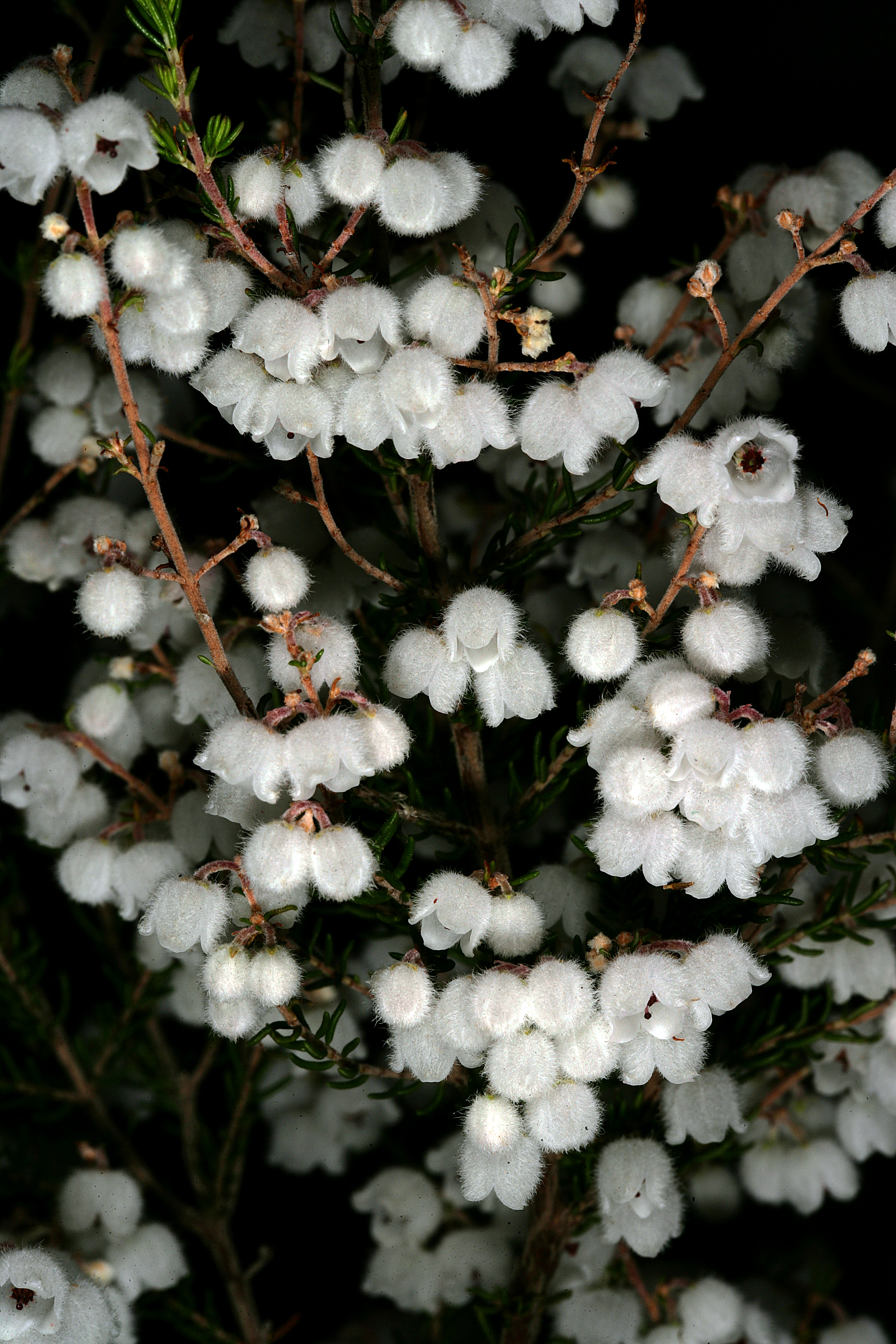

Scientific classification
- Kingdom: Plantae
- Clade: Tracheophytes
- Clade: Angiosperms
- Clade: Eudicots
- Clade: Asterids
- Order: Ericales
- Family: Ericaceae
- Genus: Erica
- Species: E. nivalis

Binomial name
- Erica nivalis Andrews

Synonyms
- Erica peziza, Andrews

= Erica nivalis =

Species of flowering plant

Erica nivalis, also known as Erica peziza, and known by its common names the woollysnow heath, velvet bell heath and white heath, is a plant belonging to the genus Erica and is part of the fynbos. The species is endemic to the Western Cape.

== Size ==
The plant is capable of growing up to 2 m (6 ft 7 in) in height, though it generally only grows up to half that or less.
