= Erica monadelphia =

Scientific classification
- Kingdom: Plantae
- Clade: Tracheophytes
- Clade: Angiosperms
- Clade: Eudicots
- Clade: Asterids
- Order: Ericales
- Family: Ericaceae
- Genus: Erica
- Species: E. monadelphia

Binomial name
- Erica monadelphia Andrews, (1797)

Species of flowering plant

Erica monadelphia is a plant belonging to the genus Erica and is part of the fynbos. The species is endemic to the Western Cape.
