= Erica patersonii =

Erica patersonii may refer to:

- Erica patersonia Andrews, a South African shrub; often misspelled as Erica patersonii
- Erica patersonii L.Bolus, a synonym of Erica viscaria subsp. pustulata
