= C. V. Karthikeyan =

Indian judge

- Born: Karthikeyan; 1964 (age 61–62); Chennai, India
- Occupation: Judge
- Known for: Member, TNSJA
- Title: Member of TNSJA of Madras High Court
- Board member of: Member, TNSJA
- Spouse: (married )
- Parents: C. V. Simharaja Sastri; Smt. Saraswathi S Satri
- Website: www.hcmadras.tn.nic.in/cvkj.html

Honorable Thiru. C. V. Karthikeyan is a sitting judge of the Madras High Court in India. He is one of the members of the Board of Governors of the Tamil Nadu State Judicial Academy.

Justice C. V. Karthikeyan was appointed Additional Judge, High Court of Madras on 6 October 2016.

== As judge of High Court ==
Justice Karthikeyan was appointed Additional Judge, High Court of Madras on 16 November 2016. He is one of the members of the Board of Governors of the TNSJA (Tamil Nadu State Judicial Academy).

== Important cases ==
Some important cases that he adjudicated upon are reported in journals like All India Reporter.

=== AIADMK Case ===
Justice Karthikeyan had passed orders to submit the accounts of the political party AIADMK.

=== Patanjali's Case ===
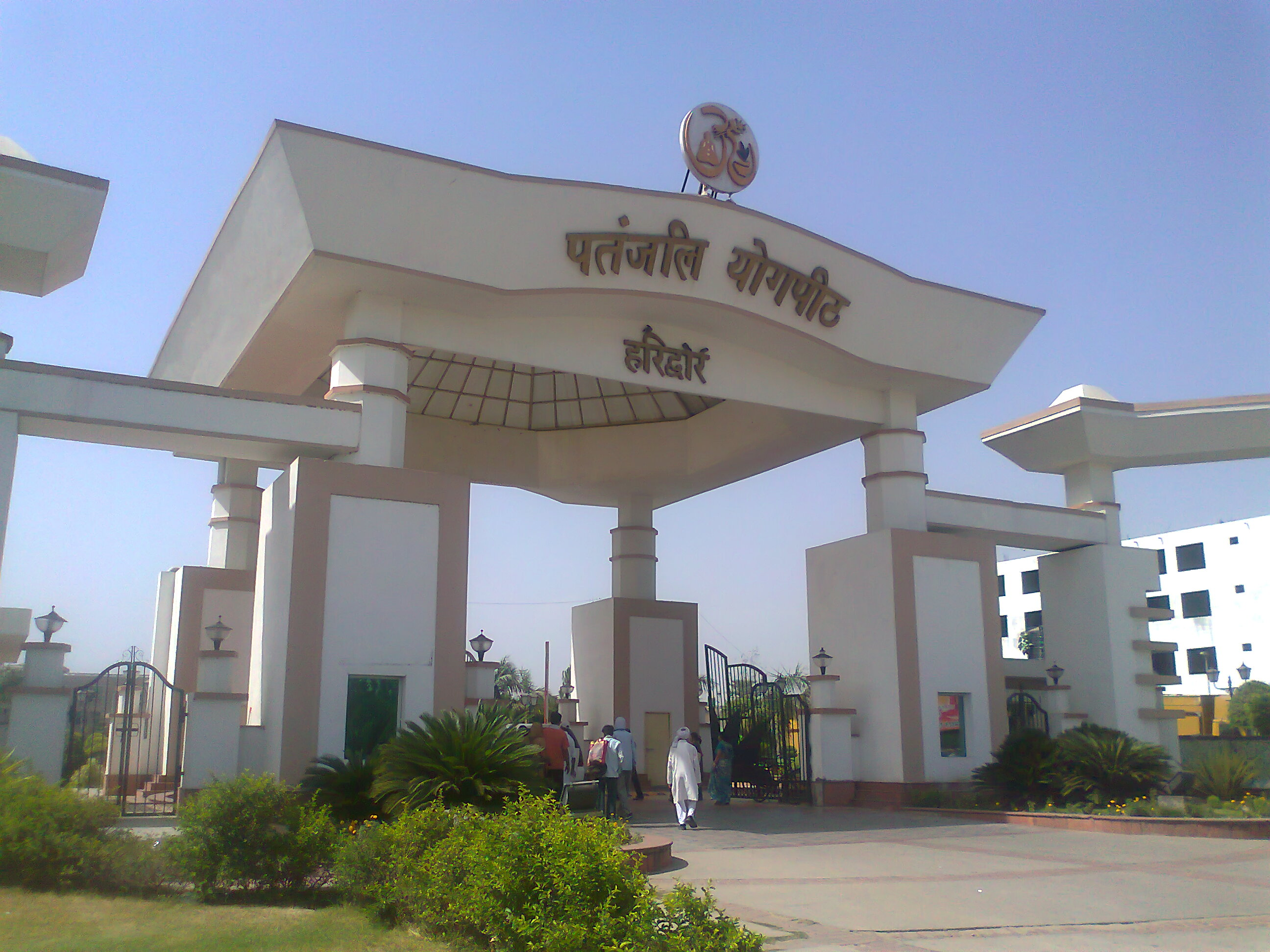

Justice C.V. Karthikeyan held there was no due cause for Patanjali Ayurved Ltd. and Divya Yog Trust to name their tablets as Coronil. When the case was ordered by Justice C. V. Karthikeyan, the same was appealed by the affected party.

=== Defamation Case ===
Justice C. V. Karthikeyan of the Madras High Court ordered notice to the YouTuber Maridhas answers on the plea filed by M Gunasekaran of TV 18 Broadcast limited.

=== TNERC Case ===
In yet another case, Justice C. V. Karthikeyan had ordered the batch of petitioners to approach the Regulatory Authority for the Electricity Board, if the Board was not following the directions for collecting the charges during pandemic.

=== Bike Taxi Case ===
in an interim order on an appeal moved by Rapido, a bike taxi service provider, Justice Vineeth Kothari and Justice C. V. Karthikeyan stayed the operation of a communication of Tamil Nadu police. The communication was addressed to Google LIC, Apple India and Indian Computer Emergency Response Team (CRET-In) directing them to remove the 'Rapido Bike' app from their platforms.

=== CGST and Input Tax Case ===
In a case relating to the Goods and Services Tax Act, a Bench consisting of Justice C.V. Karthikeyan, ordered on the issue relating to whether under Section 50 of the CGST Act, the interest on delayed filing of the returns arises automatically or not?

=== Puducherry Controversy Case ===
Justice C. V. Karthikeyan had dismissed the Puducherry Chief Minister's writ petition filed against the Lieutenant Governor Kiran Bedi's decision to issue cash instead of goods in fair price shops.
