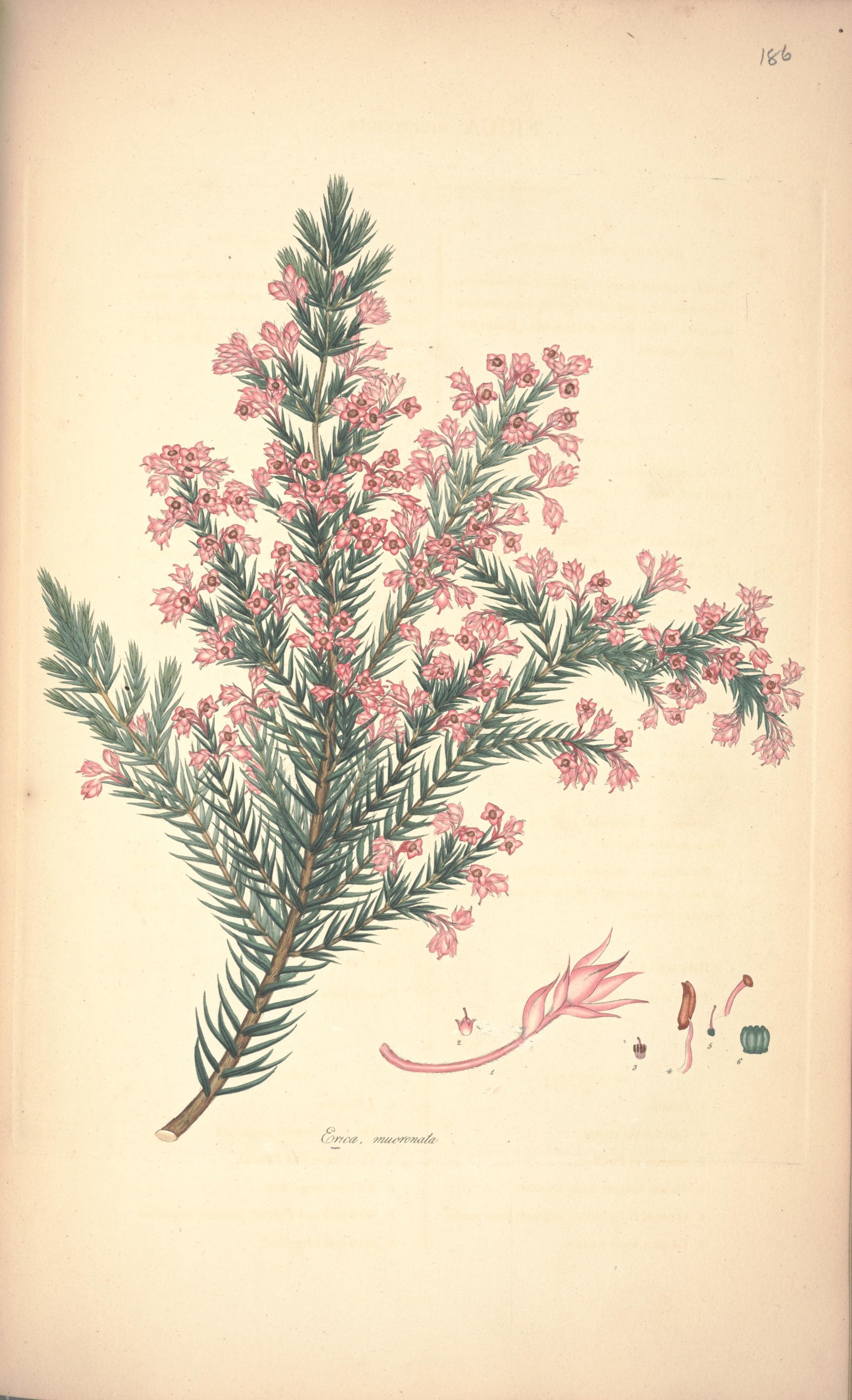

Scientific classification
- Kingdom: Plantae
- Clade: Tracheophytes
- Clade: Angiosperms
- Clade: Eudicots
- Clade: Asterids
- Order: Ericales
- Family: Ericaceae
- Genus: Erica
- Species: E. mucronata

Binomial name
- Erica mucronata Andrews

Synonyms
- Erica eriopus Benth.; Ericoides eriopus (Benth.) Kuntze; Ericoides mucronatum (Andrews) Kuntze; Eurylepis mucronata G.Don; Lamprotis mucronata Steud.

= Erica mucronata =

Species of flowering plant

Erica mucronata is a plant belonging to the genus Erica and is part of the fynbos. The species is endemic to the Western Cape, South Africa.
