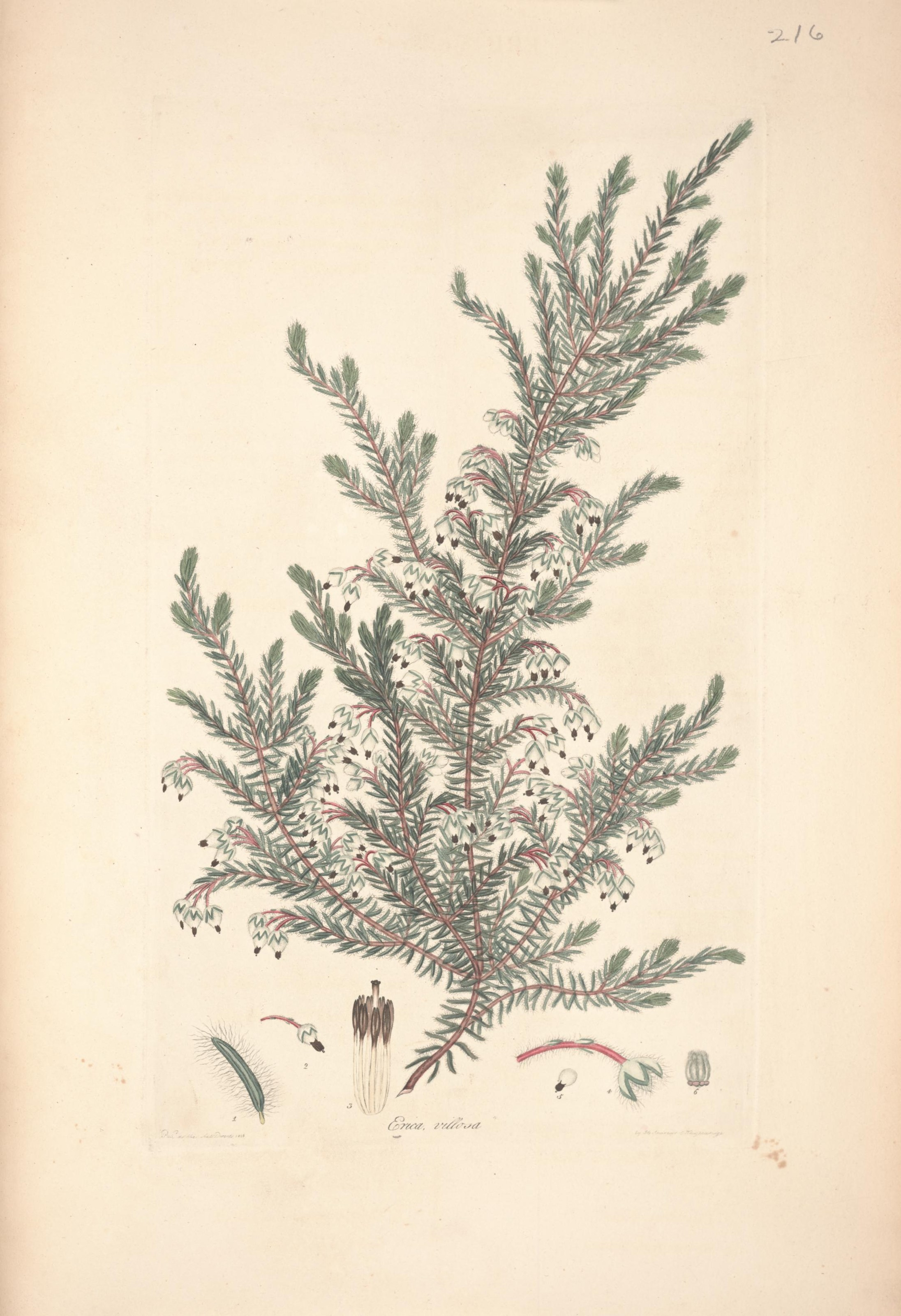

Scientific classification
- Kingdom: Plantae
- Clade: Tracheophytes
- Clade: Angiosperms
- Clade: Eudicots
- Clade: Asterids
- Order: Ericales
- Family: Ericaceae
- Genus: Erica
- Species: E. villosa

Binomial name
- Erica villosa Andrews

Synonyms
- Erica canescens W.T.Aiton; Erica eriocephala Andrews; Erica pilosa G.Lodd.; Ericoides villosum (J.C.Wendl.) Kuntze; Gypsocallis pilosa (G.Lodd.) G.Don; Gypsocallis villosa (J.C.Wendl.) G.Don

= Erica villosa =

Species of flowering plant

Erica villosa is a plant belonging to the genus Erica and is part of the fynbos. The species is endemic to the Western Cape.
