= Geodorum densiflorum =

Nodding swamp orchid
- Geodorum densiflorum growing near Peravoor

Scientific classification
- Kingdom: Plantae
- Clade: Tracheophytes
- Clade: Angiosperms
- Clade: Monocots
- Order: Asparagales
- Family: Orchidaceae
- Subfamily: Epidendroideae
- Genus: Geodorum
- Species: G. densiflorum

Binomial name
- Geodorum densiflorum (Lam.) Schltr.

Synonyms
- Epidendrum terrestre L.; Epidendrum tuberosum L. nom. superfl.; Phaius terrestris (L.) Ormerod; Geodorum citrinum Andrews

Species of orchid

Geodorum densiflorum, commonly known as pink nodding orchid or 地宝兰 (di bao lan), is a plant in the orchid family and is native to areas from tropical Asia to eastern Australia and some Pacific Islands. It is a terrestrial orchid with broad, pleated, dark green to yellowish leaves and up to and twenty pale pink flowers with dark red veins on the labellum. It grows in wetter habitats including rainforest, woodlands, grasslands and swamps.

== Description ==
Geodorum densiflorum is a leafy, terrestrial herb with crowded pseudobulbs 30–50 mm (1–2 in) long and 20–30 mm (0.8–1 in) wide. There are between three and five dark green to yellowish pleated leaves 250–350 mm (9.8–14 in) long and 60–80 mm (2–3 in) wide with a stalk 20–80 mm (0.8–3 in) long. Between eight and twenty resupinate, pale pink flowers 18–20 mm (0.7–0.8 in) wide are borne on a flowering stem 200–400 mm (8–20 in) long. The flowers do not usually open widely. The sepals are 10–12 mm (0.4–0.5 in) long, 3–4 mm (0.1–0.2 in) wide and the petals are a similar length but wider. The labellum is pink with dark red veins, 10–11 mm (0.39–0.43 in) long and 5–10 mm (0.2–0.4 in) wide with the sides curved upwards. Flowering occurs between December and February in Australia and between June and July in Asia.

== Taxonomy and naming ==
This species was first formally described in 1792 by Jean-Baptiste Lamarck who gave it the name Limodorum densiflorum and published the description in the Encyclopédie Méthodique, Botanique. In 1919, Rudolf Schlechter changed the name to Geodorum densiflorum. The specific epithet (densiflorum) is derived from the Latin words densus meaning "thick", "close" or "compact" and flos meaning "flower".

== Distribution ==
Geodorum densiflorum has been reported from India, Nepal, Bangladesh, Bhutan, Sri Lanka, Assam, Myanmar, Andaman & Nicobar Islands, Thailand, Vietnam, Ryukyu Islands, Ogasawara Islands, Guangdong, Guangxi, Guizhou, Hainan, Sichuan, Taiwan, Yunnan, Malaysia, Indonesia, Philippines, New Guinea, Australia, the Solomons, the Bismarcks, Fiji, Niue, New Caledonia, Samoa, Tonga, Vanuatu, and Micronesia. It grows in a range of mostly wet habitats including rainforests, forests and grassland.

In Australia, the species occurs in Western Australia, northern parts of the Northern Territory and from Cape York in Queensland to the Macleay River in New South Wales.

== Conservation ==
Geodorum densiflorum is listed as "endangered" under the New South Wales Government Threatened Species Conservation Act 1995. The main threats to the species are habitat loss, weed invasion and trampling.
