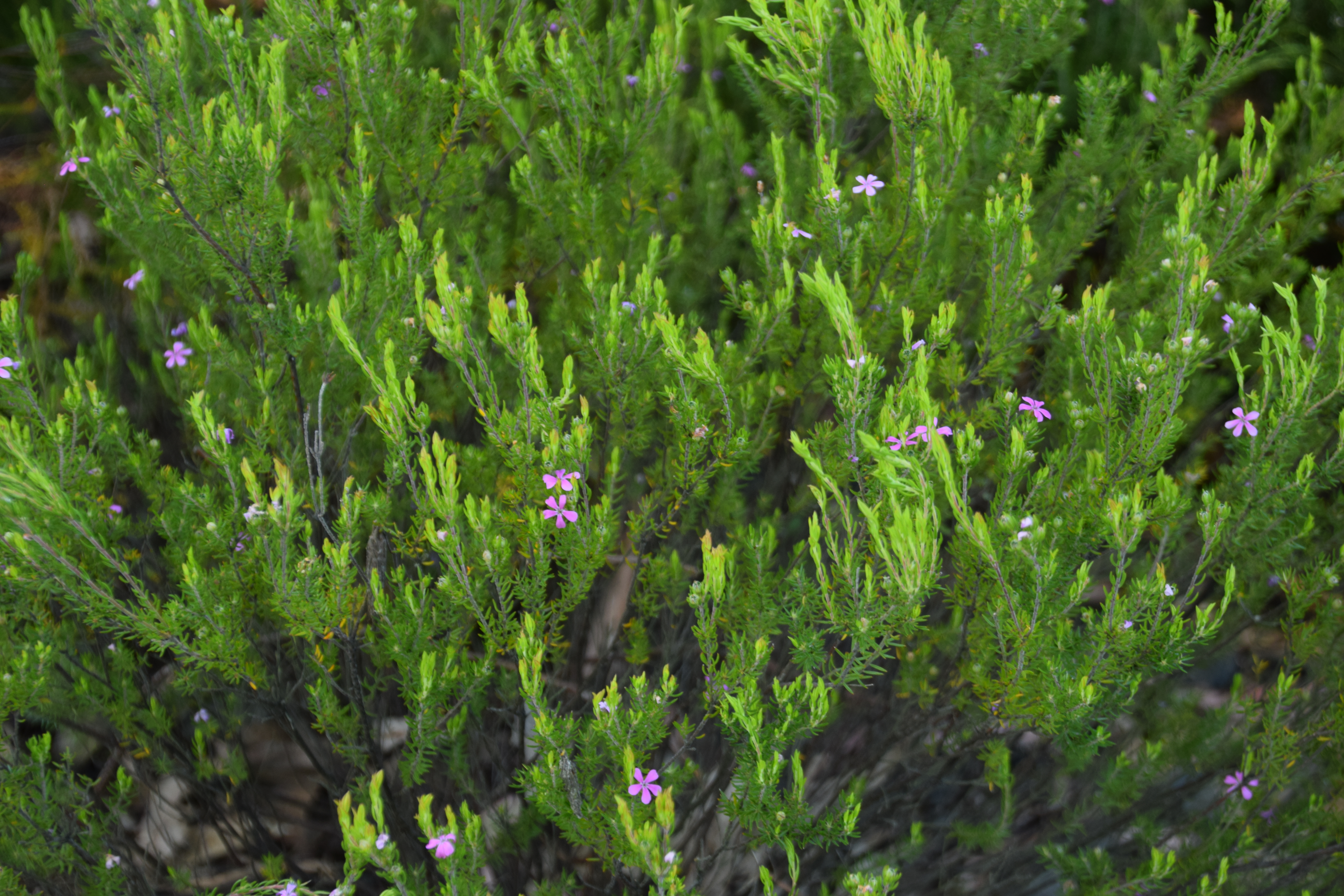

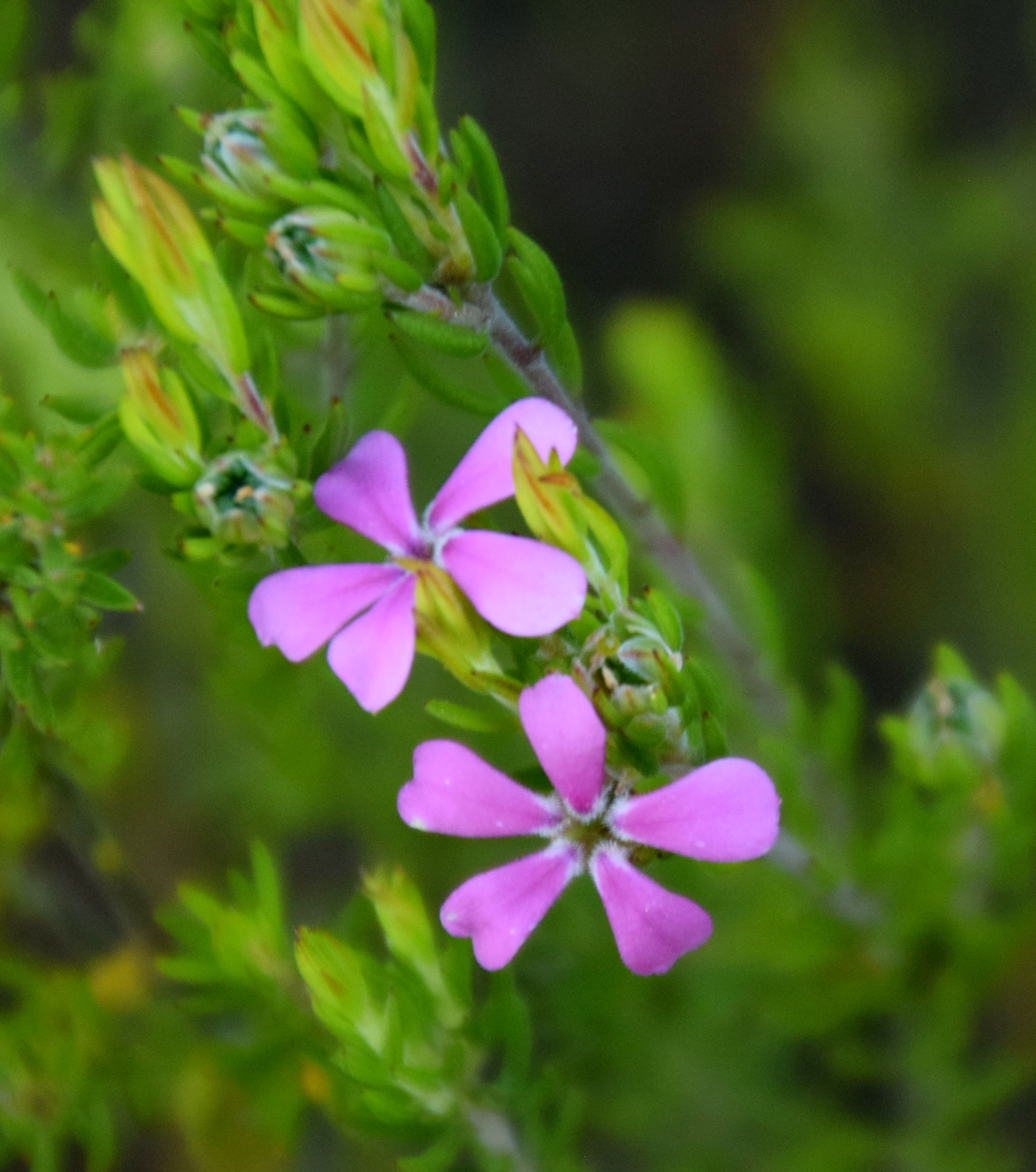

Scientific classification
- Kingdom: Plantae
- Clade: Tracheophytes
- Clade: Angiosperms
- Clade: Eudicots
- Clade: Asterids
- Order: Ericales
- Family: Ericaceae
- Genus: Erica
- Species: E. walkeria

Binomial name
- Erica walkeria Andrews

Synonyms
- Callista walkeria (Andrews) G.Don; Ericoides walkeria (Andrews) Kuntze

= Erica walkeria =

Species of flowering plant

Erica walkeria, the Swellendam heath, quality heath or Walker’s heath, is a plant belonging to the genus Erica. The species is endemic to the Western Cape.

The plant has one variety:Erica walkeria var. praestans (Andrews) Bolus.
