= Erica solandra =

Scientific classification
- Kingdom: Plantae
- Clade: Tracheophytes
- Clade: Angiosperms
- Clade: Eudicots
- Clade: Asterids
- Order: Ericales
- Family: Ericaceae
- Genus: Erica
- Species: E. solandra

Binomial name
- Erica solandra Andrews

Synonyms
- Erica solandriana Benth.; Ericoides solandrianum (Andrews) Kuntze

Species of flowering plant

Erica solandra (also spelled as Erica solandri), commonly known as the sun heath, is a plant belonging to the genus Erica. The species is endemic to the Western Cape.
