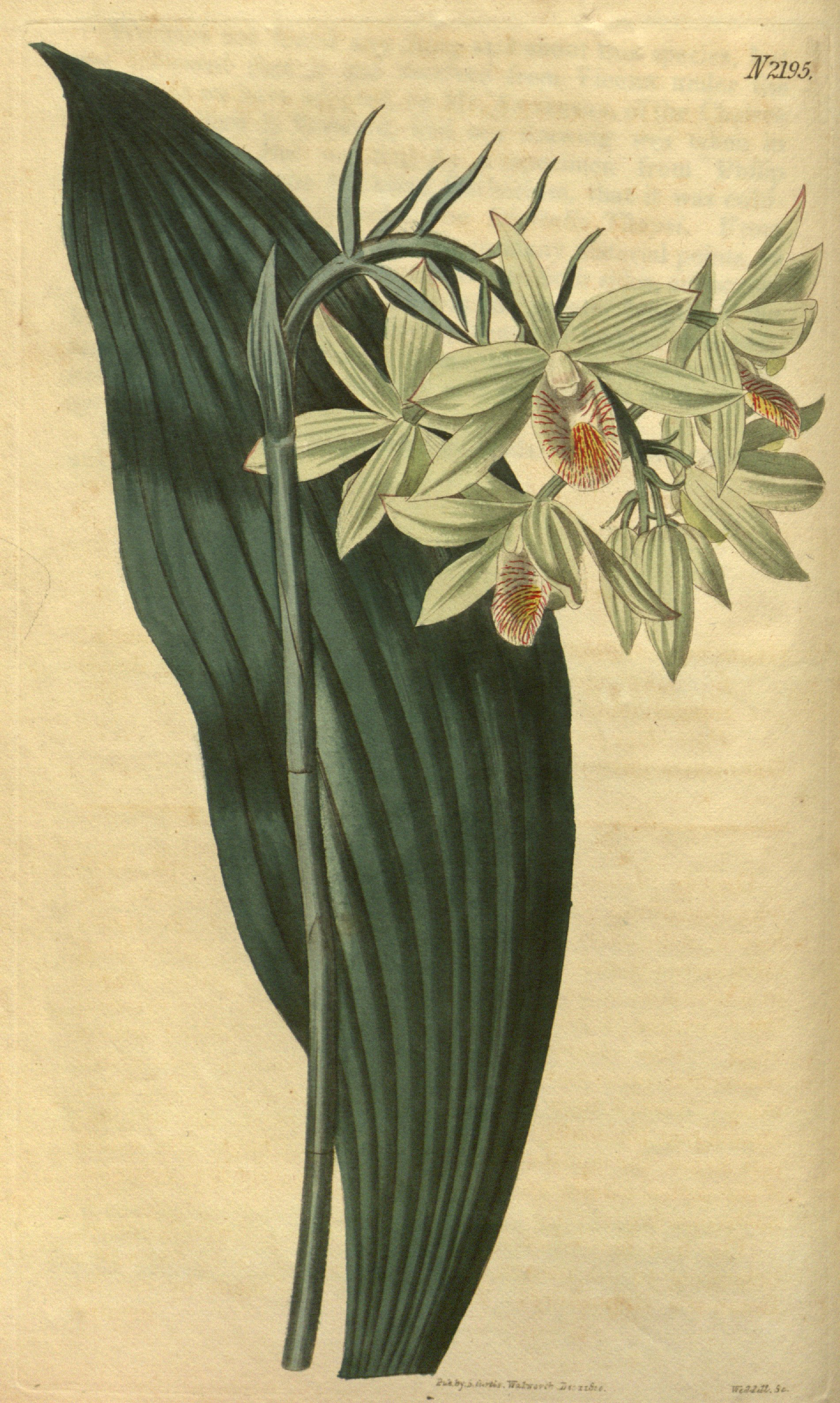
- Illustration of Geodorum terrestre from Curtis's Botanical Magazine

Scientific classification
- Kingdom: Plantae
- Clade: Tracheophytes
- Clade: Angiosperms
- Clade: Monocots
- Order: Asparagales
- Family: Orchidaceae
- Subfamily: Epidendroideae
- Genus: Geodorum
- Species: G. terrestre

Binomial name
- Geodorum terrestre (L.) Garay

Synonyms
- Epidendrum terrestre L.; Epidendrum tuberosum L. nom. superfl.; Phaius terrestris (L.) Ormerod; Geodorum citrinum Andrews

= Geodorum terrestre =

Pink shepherds' crook

Species of orchid

Geodorum terrestre, commonly known as pink shepherds' crook or bent orchid, is a plant in the orchid family and is native to areas from tropical Asia to northern Australia. It is a terrestrial orchid with broad, pleated leaves and up to and twenty pale pink flowers with dark red veins on the labellum. It grows in wetter habitats including swamps.

== Description ==
Geodorum terrestre is a leafy, terrestrial herb with crowded, often yellowish pseudobulbs 30–50 mm (1–2 in) long and 20–30 mm (0.8–1 in) wide. The leaves are glabrous, pleated and 250–350 mm (9.8–14 in) long and 60–80 mm (2–3 in) wide. Between eight and twenty pale pink flowers 18–20 mm (0.7–0.8 in) wide are borne on a flowering stem 200–300 mm (8–10 in) long. As the flowers open, the flowering stem droops downwards and as the flowers wilt, the stem becomes upright again. The sepals are 12–15 mm (0.5–0.6 in) long, about 4 mm (0.2 in) wide with boat-shaped lateral sepals. The petals are 13–16 mm (0.5–0.6 in) long, 4–5 mm (0.16–0.20 in) wide. The labellum is pink with dark red veins, 13–15 mm (0.5–0.6 in) long and 10–12 mm (0.39–0.47 in) wide with the sides curved upwards. Flowering occurs between December and February in Australia and between March and May, or October and November in Asia.

== Taxonomy and naming ==
Pink shepherds' crook was first described in 1759 by Carl Linnaeus who gave it the name Epidendrum terrestre. He published the description in the 10th edition of Systema Naturae, based on an illustration in Rumphius's Herbarium amboinense. In 1994, Paul Abel Ormerod changed the name to Phaius terrestris but Leslie Andrew Garay considers that it was a mistake to attempt to reconcile Linnaeus' description with a later description from 1763, and relies on the original illustration in the Herbarium Amboinense. In 1997, Garay changed the name to Geodorum terrestre. The specific epithet (terrestre) is a Latin word meaning "of the earth", referring to the terrestrial habit of this orchid.

== Distribution and habitat ==
Geodorum terrestre occurs between Nepal and northern Australia. It grows in moist forest including rainforest, in river gullies and near waterfalls. In Australia it occurs in the Kimberley region of Western Australia, in northern parts of the Northern Territory and in eastern Australia between Cape York and the Macleay River in New South Wales.
