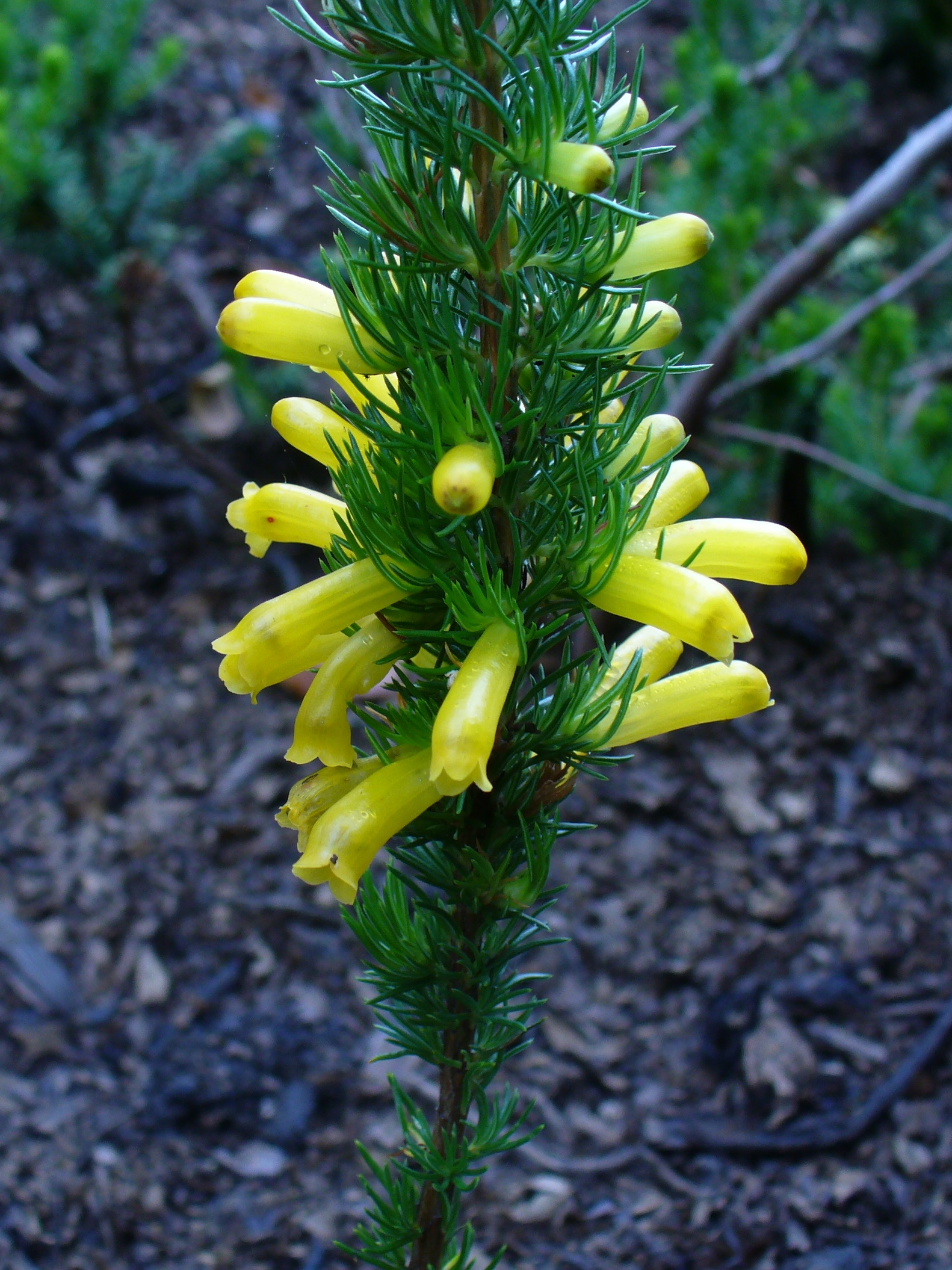

Scientific classification
- Kingdom: Plantae
- Clade: Tracheophytes
- Clade: Angiosperms
- Clade: Eudicots
- Clade: Asterids
- Order: Ericales
- Family: Ericaceae
- Genus: Erica
- Species: E. patersonia

Binomial name
- Erica patersonia Andrews

= Erica patersonia =

Species of flowering plant

Erica patersonia is a species of Erica heath native to the fynbos region of South Africa.
