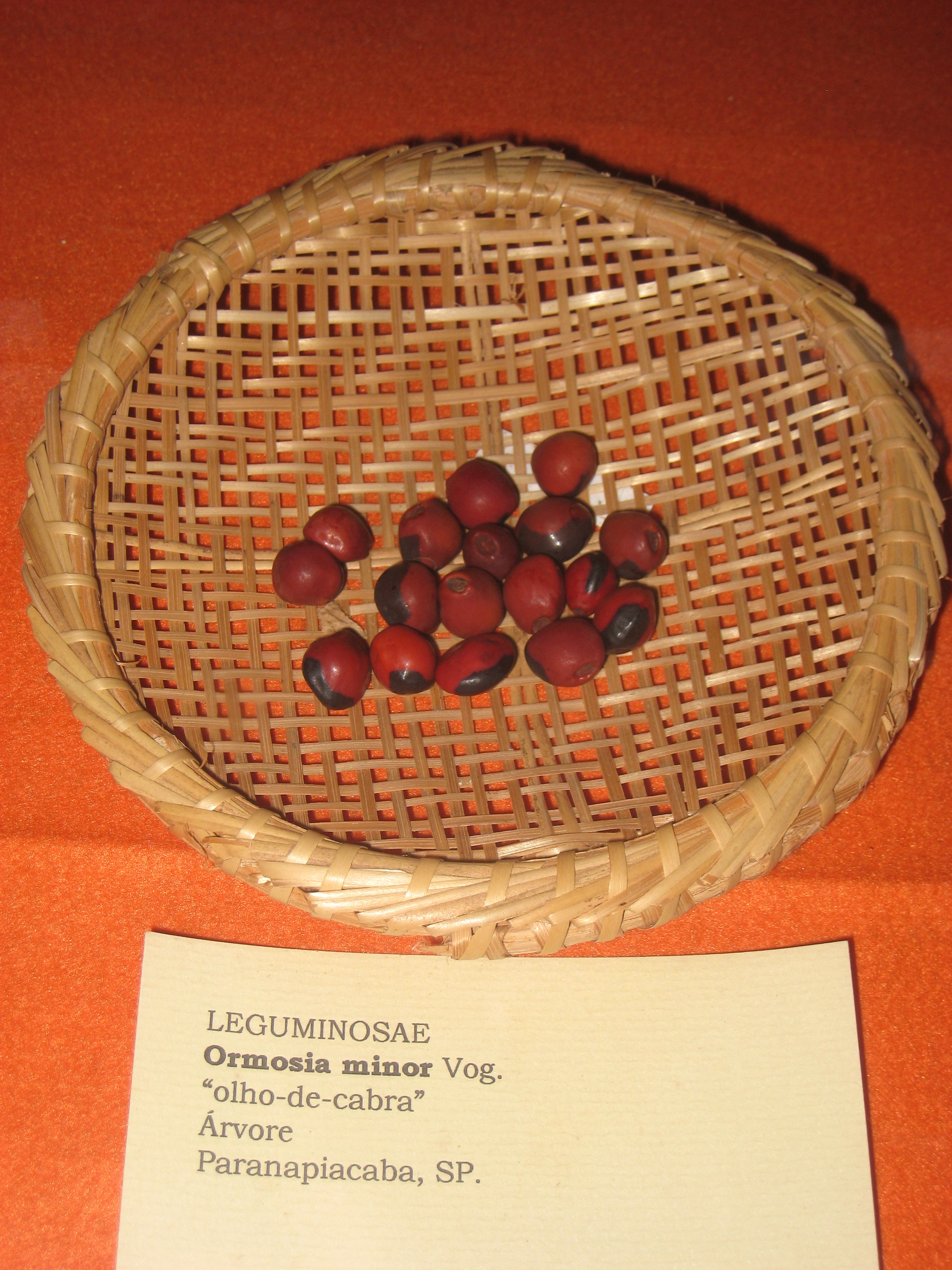
- Seeds of Ormosia minor

Scientific classification
- Kingdom: Plantae
- Clade: Tracheophytes
- Clade: Angiosperms
- Clade: Eudicots
- Clade: Rosids
- Order: Fabales
- Family: Fabaceae
- Subfamily: Faboideae
- Tribe: Ormosieae
- Genus: Ormosia; Jacks. nom. cons.

Species
- See text

Synonyms
- Arillaria Kurz; Chaenolobium Miq.; Fedorovia Yakovlev; Layia Hook. & Arn., nom. illeg.; Macrotropis DC.; Macroule Pierce; Ormosiopsis Ducke; Placolobium Miq.; Podopetalum F.Muell., nom. illeg.; Ruddia Yakovlev; Toulichiba Adans.; Trichocyamos Yakovlev

= Ormosia =

Genus of legumes

Ormosia is a genus of legumes (family Fabaceae), with 130 living species. They are mostly trees or large shrubs, and are native to the tropical Americas, from southwestern Mexico to Bolivia and southern Brazil, to southern, southeastern, and eastern Asia, and to New Guinea and Queensland. Most are tropical, while some extend into temperate regions of China. A few species are threatened by habitat destruction, while the Hainan ormosia (Ormosia howii) is probably extinct already.

Plants in this genus are commonly known as horse-eye beans or simply ormosias, and in Spanish by the somewhat ambiguous term "chocho". The scientific name Ormosia is a nomen conservandum, overruling Toulichiba which is formally rejected under the International Code of Nomenclature for algae, fungi, and plants.

The seeds of these plants are poisonous if eaten, but often look pretty, with bright colors and decorative patterns reminiscent of an eye; the common name "horse-eye beans" refers to these seeds. They resemble the seeds of Abrus, snoutbeans (Rhynchosia), and Adenanthera, but are much larger than the former two. In particular those of Ormosia coccinea are often used for jewelry and other decorative purposes, or as good luck charms. The seeds float and are occasionally found as sea beans.

Ormosia wood is used as timber or firewood. Some species, for example Ormosia nobilis, are also used in folk medicine.

== Fossil record ==
8 dehiscent seed pod fossils of one Ormosia species from the middle Eocene epoch have been examined from Warman clay pit in Weakley County, while 52 fossil leaflets of two Ormosia species have been described from Warman, New Lawrence and Lamkin clay pits in Weakley and Henry Counties, Tennessee, United States.

== Species ==
The following list includes all 130 species in this genus that are accepted by Plants of the World Online as of 22 September 2023.

- Ormosia altimontana Meireles & H.C.Lima
- Ormosia amazonica Ducke
- Ormosia antioquensis Rudd
- Ormosia arborea (Vell.) Harms
- Ormosia assamica Yakovlev
- Ormosia bahiensis Monach.
- Ormosia balansae Drake
- Ormosia bancana (Miq.) Merr.
- Ormosia bolivarensis (Rudd) C.H.Stirt.
- Ormosia boluoensis Y.Q.Wang & P.Y.Chen
- Ormosia bopiensis Pierce
- Ormosia calavensis Azaola
- Ormosia cambodiana Gagnep.
- Ormosia carinata N.Zamora
- Ormosia chevalieri Niyomdham
- Ormosia cinerea Benoist
- Ormosia coarctata Jacks.
- Ormosia coccinea (Aubl.) Jacks.
- Ormosia colombiana Rudd
- Ormosia corcovada Herrera-Palma, C.H.Stirt. & D.B.O.S.Cardoso
- Ormosia costulata (Miq.) Kleinhoonte
- Ormosia coutinhoi Ducke
- Ormosia crassivalvis Gagnep.
- Ormosia cruenta Rudd
- Ormosia cuatrecasasii Rudd
- Ormosia discolor Spruce ex Benth.
- Ormosia elata Rudd
- Ormosia elliptica Q.W.Yao & R.H.Chang
- Ormosia emarginata (Hook. & Arn.) Benth.
- Ormosia eugeniifolia Tsiang ex R.H.Chang
- Ormosia excelsa Benth.
- Ormosia fastigiata Tul.
- Ormosia ferruginea R.H.Chang
- Ormosia flava (Ducke) Rudd
- Ormosia fordiana Oliv.
- Ormosia formosana Kaneh.
- Ormosia friburgensis Taub. ex Harms
- Ormosia froesii Rudd
- Ormosia glaberrima Y.C.Wu
- Ormosia glauca Wall.
- Ormosia gracilis Prain
- Ormosia grandiflora (Tul.) Rudd
- Ormosia grandistipulata Whitmore
- Ormosia grossa Rudd
- Ormosia hekouensis R.H.Chang
- Ormosia hengchuniana T.C.Huang, S.F.Huang & K.C.Yang
- Ormosia henryi Prain
- Ormosia hoaensis Pierre ex Gagnep.
- Ormosia holerythra Ducke
- Ormosia hosiei Hemsl. & E.H.Wilson
- Ormosia indurata H.Y.Chen
- Ormosia inflata Merr. & Chun ex H.Y.Chen
- Ormosia integrifolia Aver.
- Ormosia intermedia N.Zamora
- Ormosia isthmensis Standl.
- Ormosia jamaicensis Urb.
- Ormosia krugii Urb.
- Ormosia laosensis Niyomdham
- Ormosia larecajana Rudd
- Ormosia laxa Prain
- Ormosia lewisii D.B.O.S.Cardoso, C.H.Stirt. & Torke
- Ormosia lignivalvis Rudd
- Ormosia limae D.B.O.S.Cardoso & L.P.Queiroz
- Ormosia longipes H.Y.Chen
- Ormosia macrocalyx Ducke
- Ormosia macrodisca Baker
- Ormosia macrophylla Benth.
- Ormosia maguireorum Rudd
- Ormosia mataridek Aymard & Sanoja
- Ormosia mekongensis Mattapha, Suddee & Rueangr.
- Ormosia melanocarpa Kleinhoonte
- Ormosia merrilliana H.Y.Chen
- Ormosia microphylla Merr.
- Ormosia minor Vogel
- Ormosia monosperma (Sw.) Urb.
- Ormosia nanningensis H.Y.Chen
- Ormosia napoensis Z.Wei & R.H.Chang
- Ormosia nitida Vogel
- Ormosia nobilis Tul.
- Ormosia nuda (F.C.How) R.H.Chang & Q.W.Yao
- Ormosia oaxacana Rudd
- Ormosia olivacea H.Y.Chen
- Ormosia ormondii (F.Muell.) Merr. ex H.Y.Chen
- Ormosia pachycarpa Champ. ex Benth.
- Ormosia pachyptera H.Y.Chen
- Ormosia panamensis Benth.
- Ormosia paniculata Merr.
- Ormosia paraensis Ducke
- Ormosia penangensis Ridl.
- Ormosia peruviana Rudd
- Ormosia pingbianensis W.C.Cheng & R.H.Chang
- Ormosia pinnata (Lour.) Merr.
- Ormosia poilanei Niyomdham
- Ormosia polita Prain
- Ormosia pubescens R.H.Chang
- Ormosia purpureiflora H.Y.Chen
- Ormosia revoluta Rudd
- Ormosia robusta (Wight) Voigt
- Ormosia ruddiana Yakovlev
- Ormosia santaremnensis Ducke
- Ormosia saxatilis K.M.Lan
- Ormosia scandens Prain
- Ormosia schunkei Rudd
- Ormosia semicastrata Hance
- Ormosia sericeolucida H.Y.Chen
- Ormosia simplicifolia Merr. & Chun
- Ormosia smithii Rudd
- Ormosia solimoesensis Rudd
- Ormosia steyermarkii Rudd
- Ormosia stipulacea Meeuwen
- Ormosia stipularis Ducke
- Ormosia striata Dunn
- Ormosia subsessilis Pittier
- Ormosia subsimplex Spruce ex Benth.
- Ormosia sumatrana (Miq.) Prain
- Ormosia surigaensis Merr.
- Ormosia tavoyana Prain
- Ormosia timboensis D.B.O.S.Cardoso, Meireles & H.C.Lima
- Ormosia tonkinensis Gagnep.
- Ormosia tovarensis Pittier
- Ormosia travancorica Bedd.
- Ormosia tsangii H.Y.Chen
- Ormosia velutina Rudol
- Ormosia venezolana Rudd
- Ormosia venosa Baker
- Ormosia vicosana Rudd
- Ormosia watsonii C.E.C.Fisch.
- Ormosia williamsii Rudd
- Ormosia xylocarpa Merr. & Chun ex H.Y.Chen
- Ormosia yunnanensis Prain

== Species names with uncertain taxonomic status ==
The status of the following species is unresolved:

- Placolobium ellipticum N.D. Khoi & Yakovlev
- Placolobium vietnamense N.D. Khoi & Yakovlev
