= Ormosia amazonica =

Conservation status
- Least Concern (IUCN 3.1)

Scientific classification
- Kingdom: Plantae
- Clade: Tracheophytes
- Clade: Angiosperms
- Clade: Eudicots
- Clade: Rosids
- Order: Fabales
- Family: Fabaceae
- Subfamily: Faboideae
- Genus: Ormosia
- Species: O. amazonica

Binomial name
- Ormosia amazonica Ducke
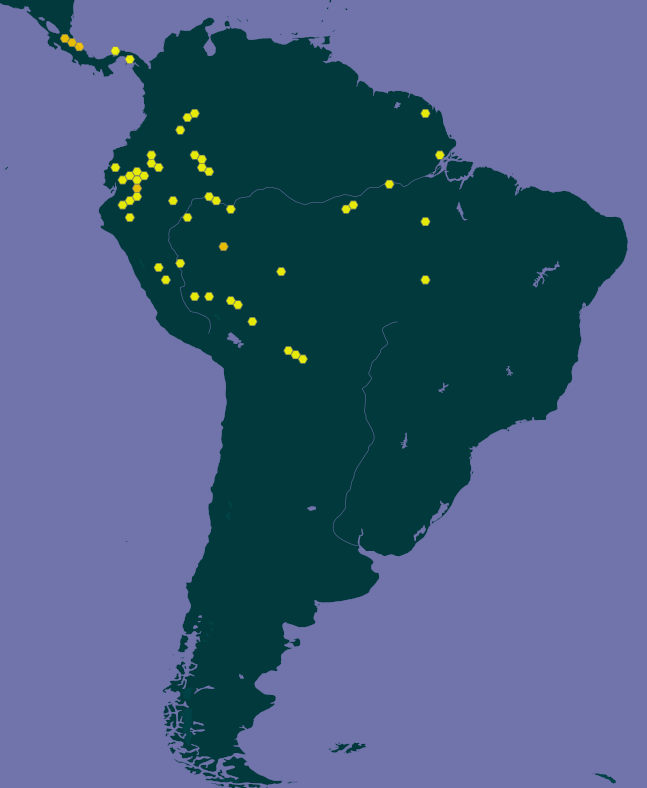

Synonyms
- Ormosia amazonica var. venenifera R.E.Schult. Ormosia euneura Harms

Species of plant

Ormosia amazonica is a species of tree in the family Fabaceae native to the Amazon rainforest. It is naturally distributed in Brazil, Bolivia, Colombia, Costa Rica, Ecuador and Peru, in the Amazon Forest in Igarapó Forests. The species was first described by the Brazilian botanist of Austro-Hungarian origin Adolpho Ducke in 1922.

== Notes ==
- This article was partially translated from the Portuguese version of Wikipedia, whose title is Ormosia amazonica.
