= Ormosia howii =

Conservation status
- Extinct (IUCN 2.3)

Scientific classification
- Kingdom: Plantae
- Clade: Tracheophytes
- Clade: Angiosperms
- Clade: Eudicots
- Clade: Rosids
- Order: Fabales
- Family: Fabaceae
- Subfamily: Faboideae
- Genus: Ormosia
- Species: †O. howii

Binomial name
- †Ormosia howii Merr. & Chen

Species of legume

Ormosia howii, the Hainan ormosia, is a species of flowering plant in the family Fabaceae native to southern China. It was initially found on Diaoluo Shan, Hainan Island in 1954 and then in Yangchun, Guangdong in 1957, both times in extremely small populations. The species is now apparently extinct. It was a small tree, 10 metres (33 ft) high, growing in open forests on mountain slopes.
