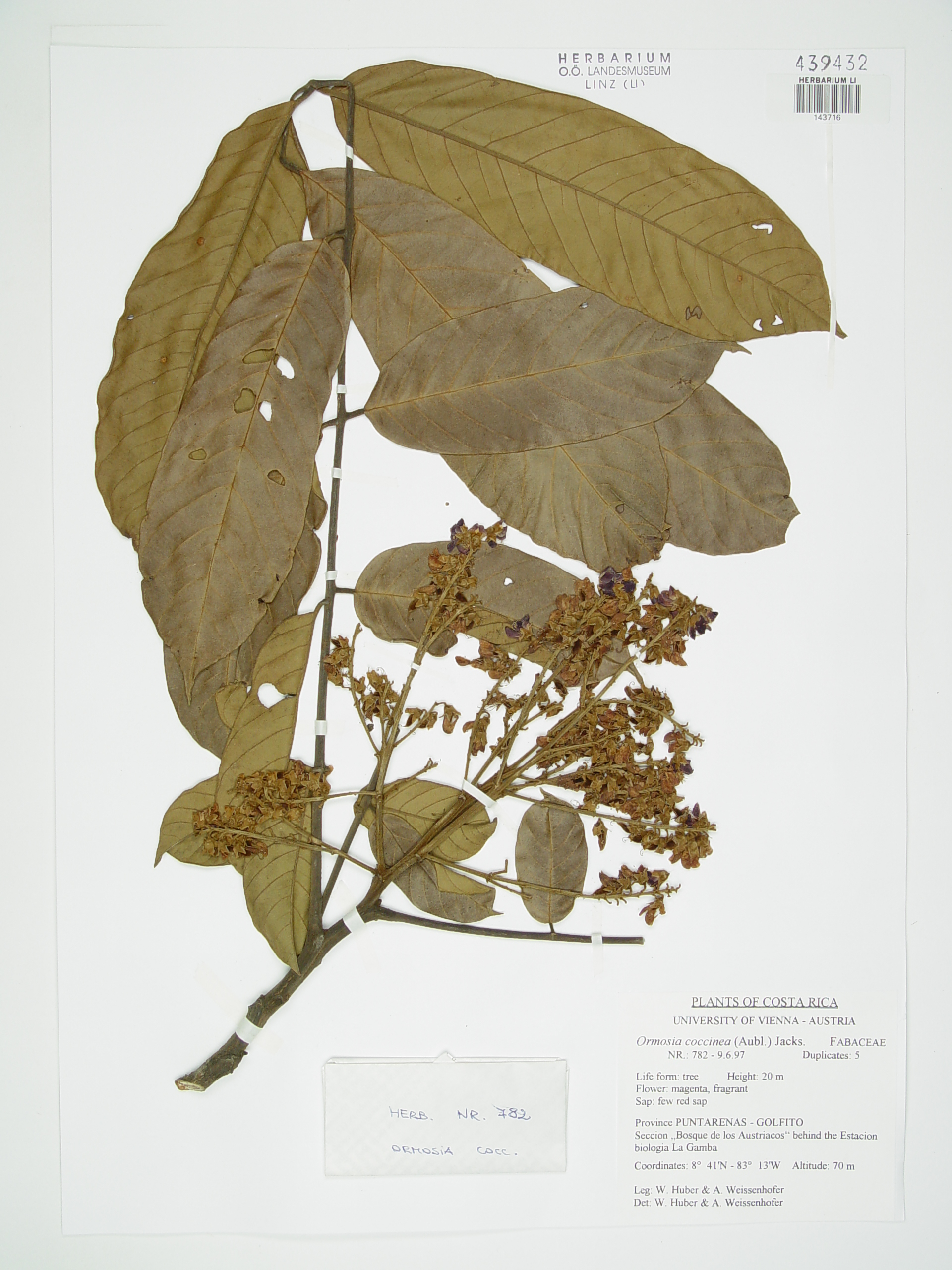
- Huayruro seeds

Conservation status
- Least Concern (IUCN 3.1)

Scientific classification
- Kingdom: Plantae
- Clade: Tracheophytes
- Clade: Angiosperms
- Clade: Eudicots
- Clade: Rosids
- Order: Fabales
- Family: Fabaceae
- Subfamily: Faboideae
- Genus: Ormosia
- Species: O. coccinea

Binomial name
- Ormosia coccinea (Aubl.) Jacks.

Synonyms
- Robinia coccinea Aubl.

= Ormosia coccinea =

Species of legume

Ormosia coccinea is a plant that grows throughout the South Eastern North American countries, and all throughout South America. It produces beautiful red seeds with one black spot covering one-third of its surface. These seeds are used for jewelry and other decorative purposes.

The seeds are known as wayruru (Aymara, also spelled huayruro, huayruru, wayruro) in Peru, where villagers believe them to be powerful good luck charms, and nene or chumico in Costa Rica. A French name is panacoco, but this more often applies to Swartzia tomentosa.

Kharisiri, a fat-sucking Andean folkloric creature, are said to carry wayruru beans in their pockets when they attack victims.

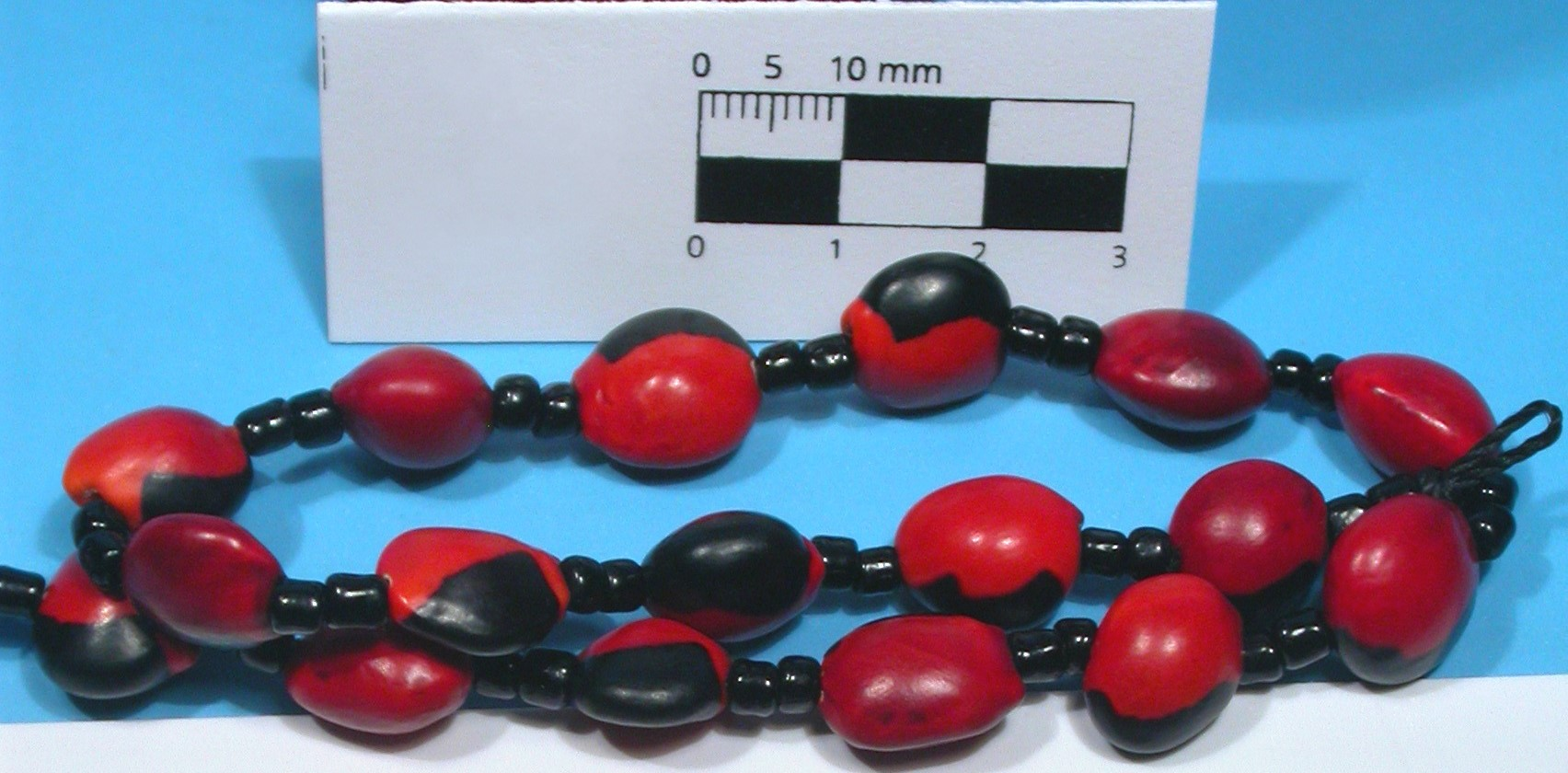
Necklance made of Ormosia coccinea seeds with small black beads between them
