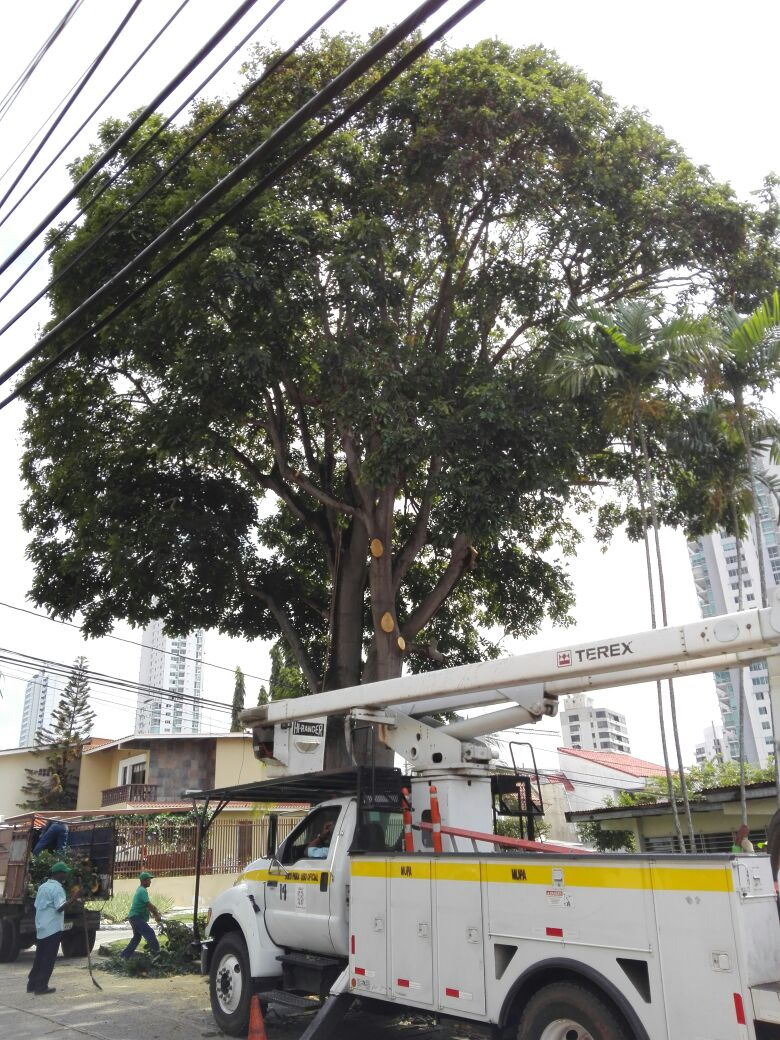

Conservation status
- Data Deficient (IUCN 2.3)

Scientific classification
- Kingdom: Plantae
- Clade: Tracheophytes
- Clade: Angiosperms
- Clade: Eudicots
- Clade: Rosids
- Order: Fabales
- Family: Fabaceae
- Subfamily: Faboideae
- Genus: Ormosia
- Species: O. cruenta

Binomial name
- Ormosia cruenta Rudd

= Ormosia cruenta =

Species of legume

Ormosia cruenta is a species of flowering plant in the family Fabaceae. It is found in Panama and Costa Rica.
