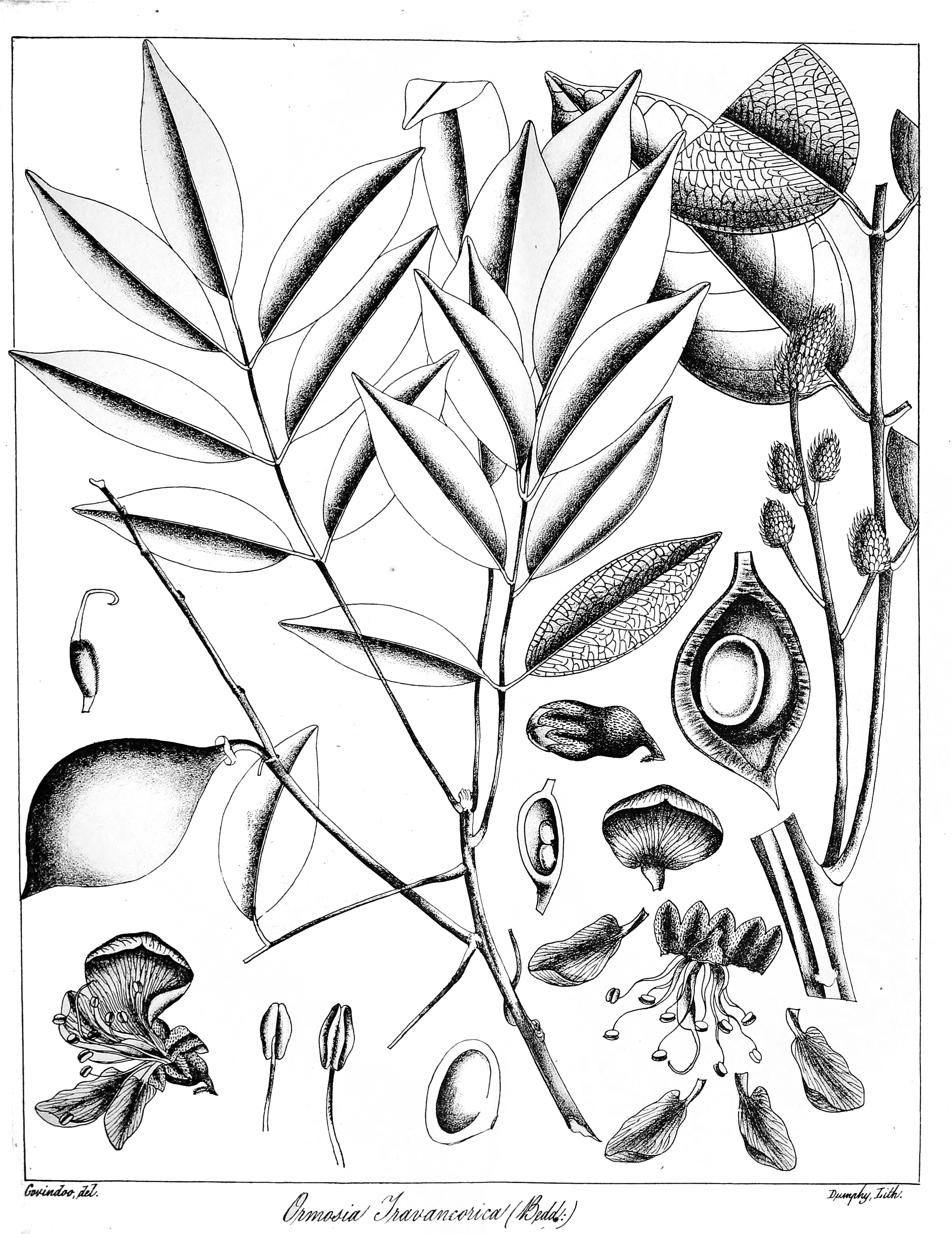

Scientific classification
- Kingdom: Plantae
- Clade: Tracheophytes
- Clade: Angiosperms
- Clade: Eudicots
- Clade: Rosids
- Order: Fabales
- Family: Fabaceae
- Subfamily: Faboideae
- Genus: Ormosia
- Species: O. travancorica

Binomial name
- Ormosia travancorica Bedd.

Synonyms
- Placolobium travancoricum

= Ormosia travancorica =

Species of legume

Ormosia travancorica is a species of flowering plant in the family Fabaceae.

It is endemic to the Western Ghats of Karnataka, Kerala and Tamil Nadu. It is reasonably common in the South Sahyadri and rare in the Coorg Region of Central Sahyadri. The canopy trees in wet evergreen forests, which generally extend up to 800 m, sometimes extend up to 1200 m in the southern Ghats.
