= Swartzia panacoco =

Conservation status
- Least Concern (IUCN 3.1)

Scientific classification
- Kingdom: Plantae
- Clade: Tracheophytes
- Clade: Angiosperms
- Clade: Eudicots
- Clade: Rosids
- Order: Fabales
- Family: Fabaceae
- Subfamily: Faboideae
- Genus: Swartzia
- Species: S. panacoco

Binomial name
- Swartzia panacoco (Aubl.) Cowan

Synonyms
- Swartzia tomentosa DC.

Tree in the legume family

Swartzia panacoco, known as panococo or Brazilian ebony, is a tree of the bean family, that grows in Guyana, South America. Its wood is hard and durable. The heartwood ranges from an olive-brown to nearly black and can have lighter or darker markings that are sharply separated from the sapwood, which is lighter and yellow in appearance.

The wood of the panococo is used much like ebony but more limited due to smaller size logs.

According to "The Treasury of Botany" published by Longmans, Green, and Co. of London in 1899 for John Lindley, Ph.D., F.R.S., F.L.S., an Emeritus Professor of Botany in University College, London, panococo is also a French name for Ormosia coccinea.

In 1997, it was listed in the IUCN Red List of Threatened Plants.
