= Ormosia henryi =

Scientific classification
- Kingdom: Plantae
- Clade: Embryophytes
- Clade: Tracheophytes
- Clade: Spermatophytes
- Clade: Angiosperms
- Clade: Eudicots
- Clade: Rosids
- Order: Fabales
- Family: Fabaceae
- Subfamily: Faboideae
- Genus: Ormosia
- Species: O. henryi

Binomial name
- Ormosia henryi Prain

Synonyms
- List: Fedorovia henryi (Prain) Yakovlev; Fedorovia inopinata (Prain) Yakovlev; Ormosia dubia Prain; Ormosia henryi Hemsl. & E.H.Wilson; Ormosia inopinata Prain; Ormosia mollis Dunn

Species of flowering plant

Ormosia henryi is a species of flowering plant in the family Fabaceae, native to southern China, Vietnam, and Thailand.

== Description ==
An evergreen tree reaching 16 m (52 ft), it is found growing on slopes and alongside streams in mixed tropical forests from 100 to 1,300 m (300 to 4,300 ft) above sea level. Efforts are being made to bring it into cultivation, as its wood is considered precious. It is used as a street tree in a number of southern Chinese cities.
