= Ormosia gracilis =

Conservation status
- Conservation Dependent (IUCN 2.3)

Scientific classification
- Kingdom: Plantae
- Clade: Tracheophytes
- Clade: Angiosperms
- Clade: Eudicots
- Clade: Rosids
- Order: Fabales
- Family: Fabaceae
- Subfamily: Faboideae
- Genus: Ormosia
- Species: O. gracilis

Binomial name
- Ormosia gracilis Prain

Synonyms
- Placolobium gracile (Prain) Yakovlev

Species of legume

Ormosia gracilis is a species of flowering plant in the family Fabaceae. It is a tree endemic to Peninsular Malaysia. It is threatened by habitat loss.
