= Ormosia polita =

Conservation status
- Vulnerable (IUCN 2.3)

Scientific classification
- Kingdom: Plantae
- Clade: Tracheophytes
- Clade: Angiosperms
- Clade: Eudicots
- Clade: Rosids
- Order: Fabales
- Family: Fabaceae
- Subfamily: Faboideae
- Genus: Ormosia
- Species: O. polita

Binomial name
- Ormosia polita Prain

Synonyms
- Ormosia nitida Prain (non Vogel: preoccupied)

Species of legume

Ormosia polita is a species of flowering plant in the family Fabaceae. It is a tree endemic to Peninsular Malaysia. It is threatened by habitat loss.
