= Ormosia excelsa =

Scientific classification
- Kingdom: Plantae
- Clade: Tracheophytes
- Clade: Angiosperms
- Clade: Eudicots
- Clade: Rosids
- Order: Fabales
- Family: Fabaceae
- Subfamily: Faboideae
- Genus: Ormosia
- Species: O. excelsa

Binomial name
- Ormosia excelsa Benth.

Species of legume

Ormosia excelsa is a plant species in the genus Ormosia, a tropical legume.

Ormosia excelsa produces the O-methylated isoflavone 5-O-methylgenistein.
