= George Jackson (botanist) =

George Jackson (1780–1811) was an English botanist and author. He was born in Aberdeen in 1780 and was later in charge of A.B. Lambert's herbarium. On 2 February 1808 he was elected a Fellow of the Linnean Society and made important contributions to the Henry Cranke Andrews publication The Botanist's Repository. He formally described the genus Ormosia, publishing the description in Transactions of the Linnean Society.

Jackson died on 12 January 1811 aged 31. In the same year Robert Brown named a genus of leguminous plants Jacksonia in his honour. James Edward Smith, in Rees's Cyclopædia noted -

- "Jacksonia, so named by Mr. Robert Brown, in memory of the late Mr. George Jackson, F.L.S., a man of the most excellent and amiable character, devoted to the science of botany."
