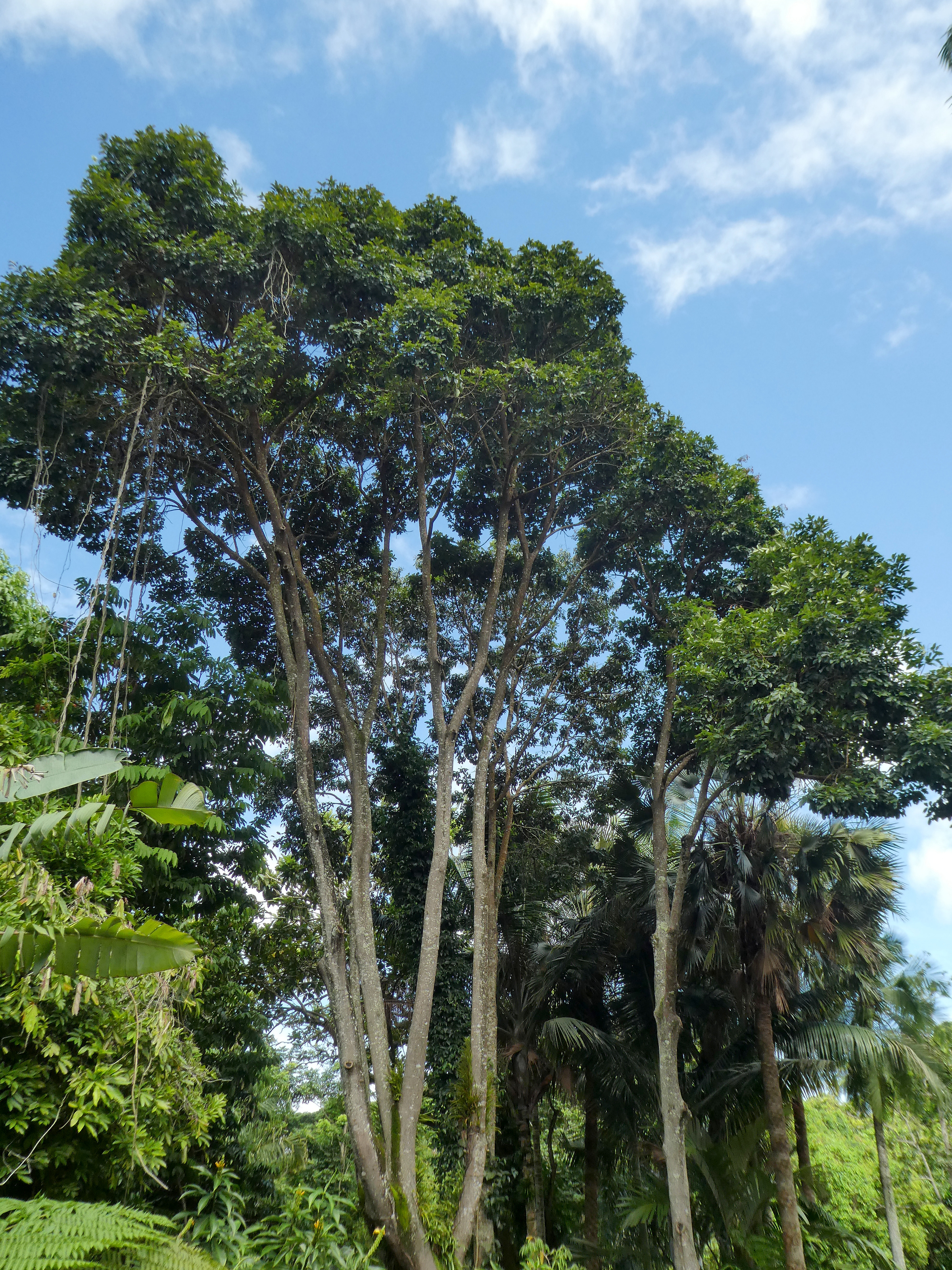
- Growing in Cairns Botanic Gardens

Conservation status
- Least Concern (NCA)

Scientific classification
- Kingdom: Plantae
- Clade: Tracheophytes
- Clade: Angiosperms
- Clade: Eudicots
- Clade: Rosids
- Order: Fabales
- Family: Fabaceae
- Subfamily: Faboideae
- Genus: Ormosia
- Species: O. ormondii

Binomial name
- Ormosia ormondii (F.Muell.) Merr.
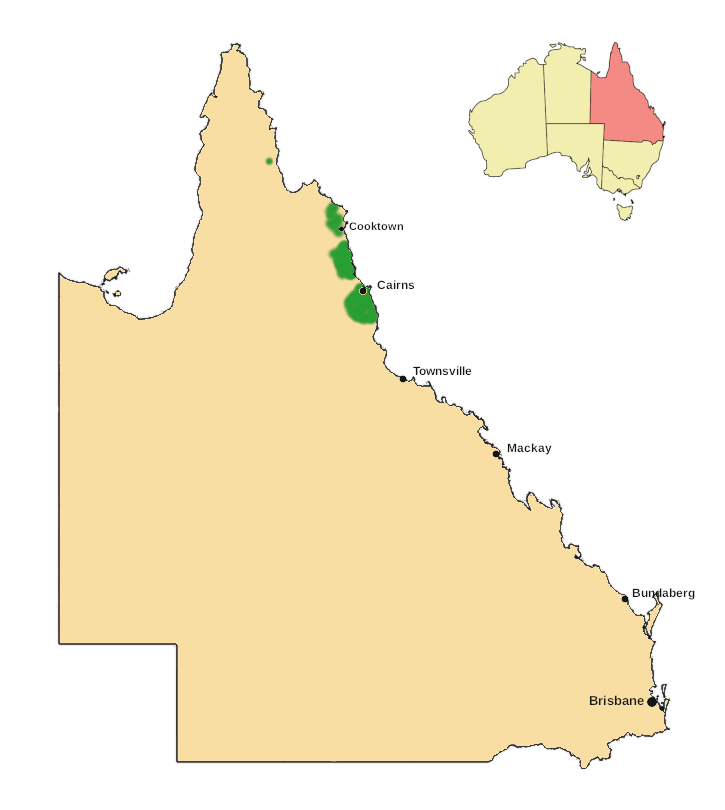

Synonyms
- Podopetalum ormondii F.Muell.

= Ormosia ormondii =

Yellow bean

Species of flowering plant

Ormosia ormondii, commonly known as yellow bean, is a tree in the legume family Fabaceae which is endemic to northeastern Queensland, Australia.

== Description ==
The yellow bean is medium-sized tree growing up to 25 m (82 ft) high, the trunk is brownish or khaki in colour and may be buttressed. The compound leaves may be whorled on the twigs, and carry 5 to 9 dark green leaflets. The leaflet blades measure up to 21 cm (8.3 in) long by 8 cm (3.1 in) wide.

The inflorescence is a panicle produced either in the leaf axils or at the end of the twigs. Masses of pink flowers, each 25–30 mm (0.98–1.18 in) long, may be seen from October to January.

The fruit is a dehiscent woody pod up to 90 mm (3.5 in) long by 20 mm (0.79 in) wide, with a persistent calyx at the base. They contain up to 5 bright red seeds around 10–14 mm (0.39–0.55 in) long.

== Taxonomy ==
This species was first described in 1882 by the Victorian Government botanist Ferdinand von Mueller as Podopetalum ormondii, and published in his work Systematic Census of Australian Plants. In 1943 the American botanist Elmer Drew Merrill published a paper in the journal Sargentia, in which he moved the species to the genus Ormosia.

== Distribution and habitat ==
The yellow bean is endemic to Queensland and occurs in coastal and sub-coastal areas from Juunju Daarrba Nhirrpan National Park north of Cooktown, to Innisfail. There is also a small outlier population in the McIlwraith Range on Cape York Peninsula about 270 km (170 mi) to the northwest of Cooktown. It grows in well developed rainforest, often beside rivers and streams, at altitudes from sea level to about 500 m (1,600 ft).

== Conservation ==
This species is listed by the Queensland Department of Environment and Science as least concern. As of 31 January 2023, it has not been assessed by the IUCN.

== Gallery ==
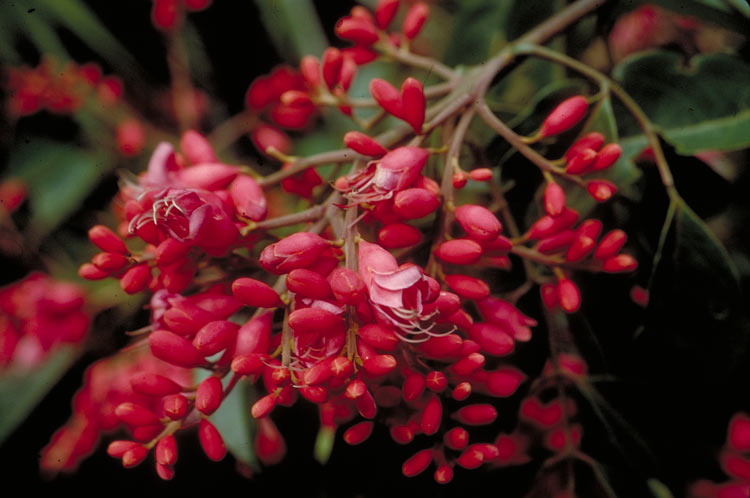
Inflorescence

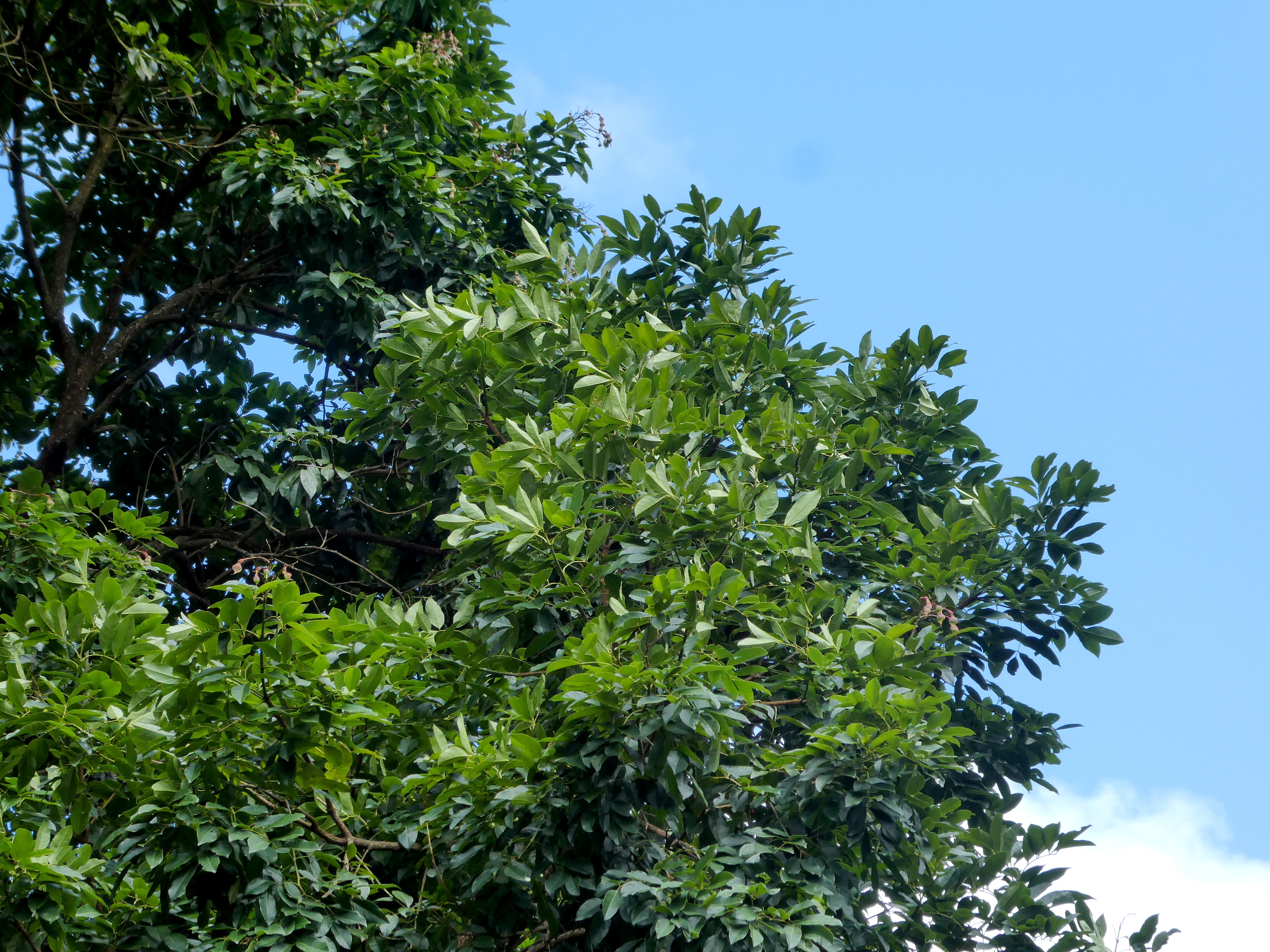
Foliage

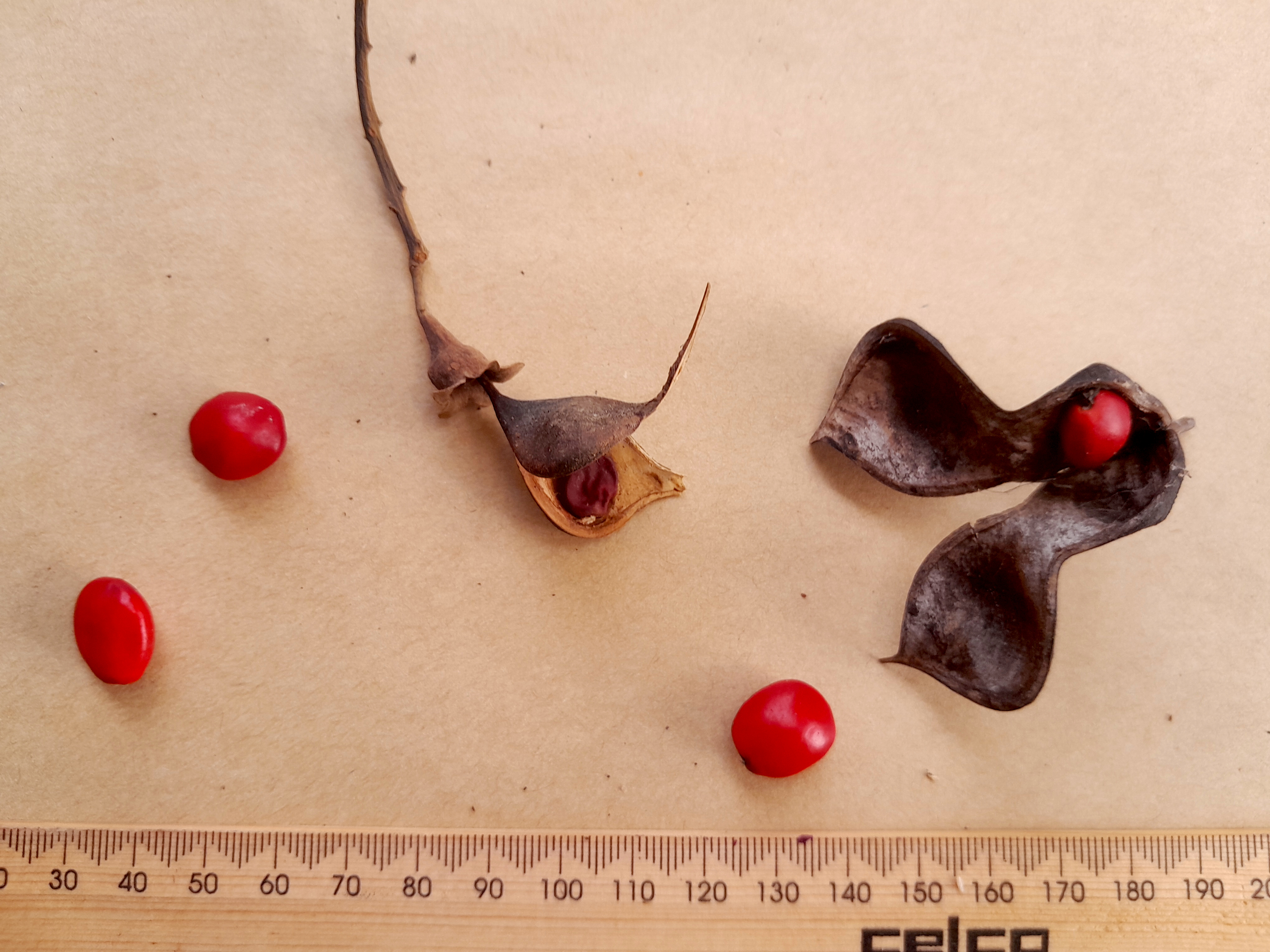
Seed pods and seeds
