= Ormosia grandistipulata =

Conservation status
- Vulnerable (IUCN 2.3)

Scientific classification
- Kingdom: Plantae
- Clade: Tracheophytes
- Clade: Angiosperms
- Clade: Eudicots
- Clade: Rosids
- Order: Fabales
- Family: Fabaceae
- Subfamily: Faboideae
- Genus: Ormosia
- Species: O. grandistipulata

Binomial name
- Ormosia grandistipulata Whitmore

Species of legume

Ormosia grandistipulata is a species of tree or shrub in the family Fabaceae. It is endemic to Peninsular Malaysia. It is threatened by habitat loss.
