= 5-O-Methylgenistein =

- Chemical structure of 5-O-methylgenistein

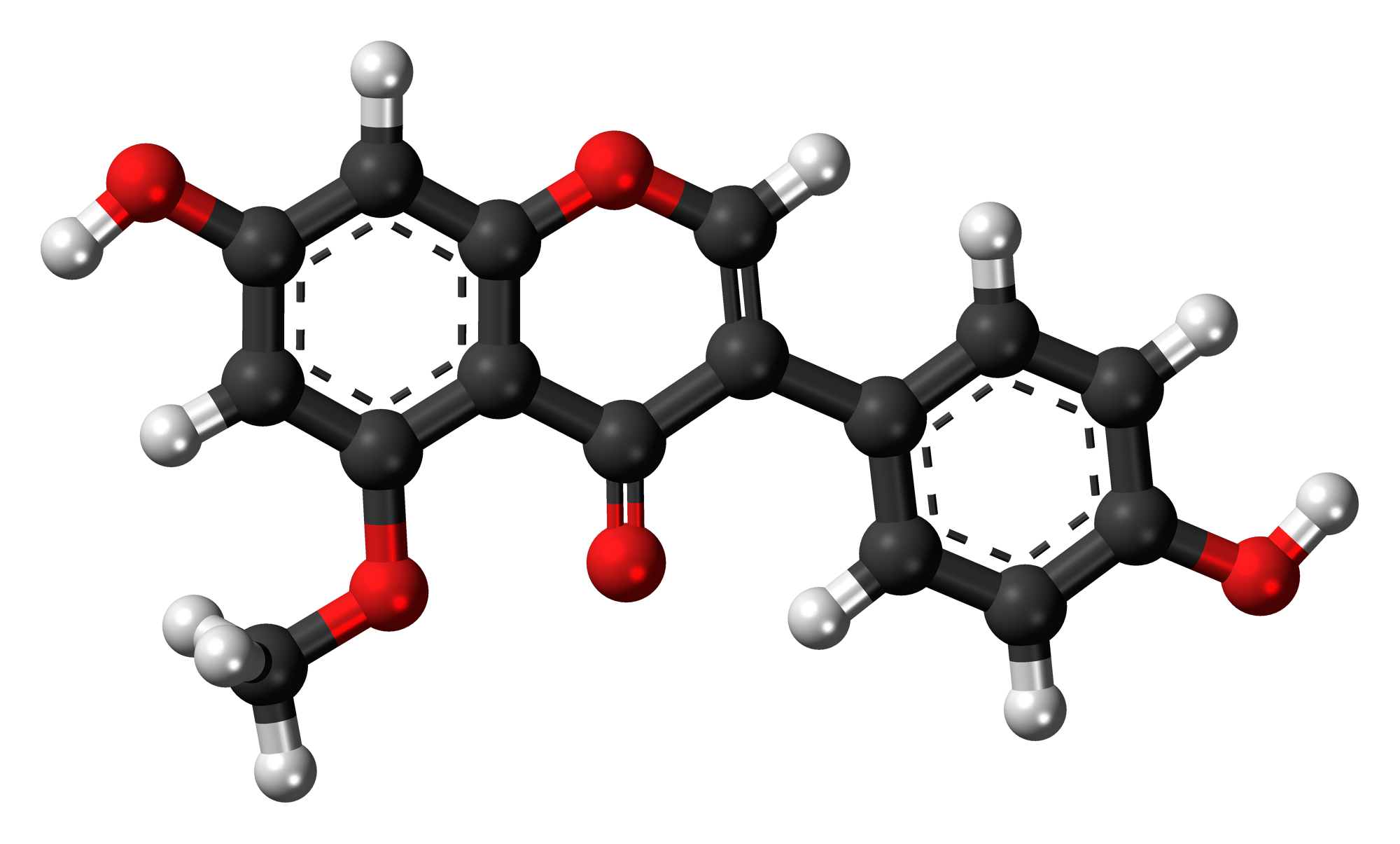

Names
- IUPAC name 4′,7-Dihydroxy-5-methoxyisoflavone
- Systematic IUPAC name 7-Hydroxy-3-(4-hydroxyphenyl)-5-methoxy-4H-1-benzopyran-4-one
- Other names Isoprunetin

Identifiers
CAS Number	4569-98-6 =
3D model (JSmol)	Interactive image
ChemSpider	4678012
ECHA InfoCard	100.230.624
PubChem CID	5748551
UNII	Q2UG76ML8U
CompTox Dashboard (EPA)	DTXSID00196598
- InChI: InChI=1S/C16H12O5/c1-20-13-6-11(18)7-14-15(13)16(19)12(8-21-14)9-2-4-10(17)5-3-9/h2-8,17-18H,1H3 Key: YSINCDVRUMTOPK-UHFFFAOYSA-N; InChI=1/C16H12O5/c1-20-13-6-11(18)7-14-15(13)16(19)12(8-21-14)9-2-4-10(17)5-3-9/h2-8,17-18H,1H3 Key: YSINCDVRUMTOPK-UHFFFAOYAD
- SMILES: COC1=C2C(=CC(=C1)O)OC=C(C2=O)C3=CC=C(C=C3)O

Properties
Chemical formula	C_{16}H_{12}O_{5}
Molar mass	284.26 g/mol
- Except where otherwise noted, data are given for materials in their standard state (at 25 °C [77 °F], 100 kPa). verify (what is ?) Infobox references

5-O-Methylgenistein is an O-methylated isoflavone. It can be found in Ormosia excelsa, a tropical legume.
