= Ormosia nobilis =

Scientific classification
- Kingdom: Plantae
- Clade: Tracheophytes
- Clade: Angiosperms
- Clade: Eudicots
- Clade: Rosids
- Order: Fabales
- Family: Fabaceae
- Subfamily: Faboideae
- Genus: Ormosia
- Species: O. nobilis

Binomial name
- Ormosia nobilis Tul.

Species of legume

Ormosia nobilis (sometimes incorrectly: Ormosia novilis) is a tree-forming plant species in the genus Ormosia. It grows in tropical South America, primarily in Bolivia, Brazil, Colombia, French Guiana, Guyana, Peru, Paraguay, and Venezuela. The Ormosis nobilis tree is known as "sirari" and it produces a commercial hardwood which is also known as sirari.

== Growth characteristics ==
The tree grows in the rain forests and reaches heights of up to 30 metres (98 ft), with very straight and cylindrical trunks.

== Uses ==
The wood is commercially cut for hardwood floors. The seeds are used in native handicrafts.

== Names ==
The tree and the wood are known by a variety of names including:

- Amargo blanco,
- Baracara,
- Chocho,
- Jatobahy do igapo,
- Kokriki,
- Mekoe,
- Palo de matos,
- Peonio, and
- Tento

== Varieties ==
Varieties include:

- Ormosia nobilis Tul. Var. bolivarensis Rudd
- Ormosia nobilis Tul. Var. nobilis
- Ormosia nobilis Tul. Var. santaremnensis (Ducke)Rudd
