= Ormosia panamensis =

Conservation status
- Vulnerable (IUCN 3.1)

Scientific classification
- Kingdom: Plantae
- Clade: Tracheophytes
- Clade: Angiosperms
- Clade: Eudicots
- Clade: Rosids
- Order: Fabales
- Family: Fabaceae
- Subfamily: Faboideae
- Genus: Ormosia
- Species: O. panamensis

Binomial name
- Ormosia panamensis Benth.

Synonyms
- Fedorovia panamensis (Benth.) Yakovlev; Ormosia stipitata Schery

Species of legume

Ormosia panamensis, commonly known as coronil or sur espino, is a species of flowering plant in the family Fabaceae. It is found in Costa Rica, Guatemala, Mexico, and Panama.
