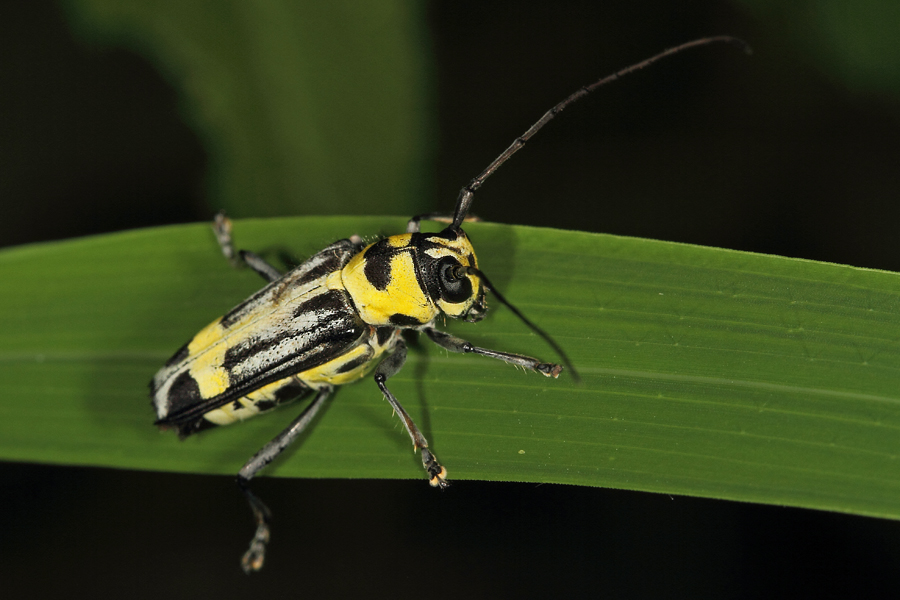

Scientific classification
- Domain: Eukaryota
- Kingdom: Animalia
- Phylum: Arthropoda
- Class: Insecta
- Order: Coleoptera
- Suborder: Polyphaga
- Infraorder: Cucujiformia
- Family: Cerambycidae
- Genus: Glenea
- Species: G. caninia

Binomial name
- Glenea caninia Heller, 1926

Synonyms
- Glenea travancorana

= Glenea caninia =

Species of beetle

Glenea caninia is a species of beetle in the family Cerambycidae. It was described by Heller in 1926 on the basis of a specimen obtained from Karwar by T.R.D. Bell. It is known from peninsular India in the Western Ghats and associated mountain forests.

These beetles are about 1.1 to 1.5 cm long. The forehead and cheeks clothed in yellowish white pubescence. The elytra have a broad post-median band of yellow hairs. The species is closely related to G. galathea of which this was once considered as a subspecies.
