= Shanti Swarup Gupta =

Swanti Swarup Gupta may refer to:

- Shanti Swarup Gupta (economist) (1929–2018), Indian economist, author, and academic administrator
- Shanti S. Gupta (1925–2002), Indian–American statistician
