= Leonard John Sedgwick =

Leonard John Sedgwick (April 1883 – 27 June 1925) was an Indian civil servant who worked in the Bombay Presidency and collected and described plants as an amateur botanist. His collections are held in St Xavier's College, Bombay.

Leonard, better known as Jack, was born in Bristol, the youngest son of four children, of Roger Buttery Sedgwick and Anna Diana Acworth. He studied at Uppingham, and graduated from Pembroke College, Cambridge with a First Class in the Classics Tripos of 1905. He qualified for the Indian Civil Service and arrived in Bombay in 1906 and was posted to Satara District. During a trip to Mahabaleshwar he had to push his car in the rains for a quarter mile. Exhausted, he returned from the trip at the end of May 1925, but fell ill with paratyphoid. He died on 27 June at St George's Hospital. He was buried at Sewri Christian Cemetery.

He collected numerous plant specimens across western India including bryophytes. The genus Bryosedgwickia was named after him. He also took an interest in Marathi literature and wrote The Naladamayanti Of Raghunathpandita (1912) and an article on Bhakti. Along with T.R.D. Bell, and P.F. Fyson, he founded the Journal of Indian Botany in 1919.

He married Agnes Winifred Guidera in 1911.

The standard author abbreviation Sedgw. is used to indicate this person as the author when citing a botanical name.
