= E. S. Appasamy =

Indian social worker and educator (1878–1963)

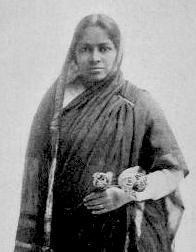
- E. S. Appasamy, from a 1922 publication.
- Born: Elizabeth Sornam Cornelius; 1878
- Died: 1963 (aged 84–85); Nangamangalam, Chittoor, Andhra Pradesh, India
- Other names: Swarnam Appasamy, E. Sornam Appasamy
- Occupations: educator, social worker
- Years active: 1920s–1940s

Elizabeth Sornam Cornelius Appasamy (1878–1963), known professionally as Mrs. Paul Appasamy or E. S. Appasamy, was an Indian social worker and educator, working in Madras with the YWCA, and as national secretary of the National Missionary Society in India in the 1920s. She founded the Vidyodaya School for girls in 1924.

== Early life ==
Elizabeth Sornam (or Swarnam) Cornelius was born in 1878, one of the ten children of Solomon Duraisamy Cornelius and Esther Rajanayagam. Her parents were Christians; her father was employed in the Public Works Department. She attended Epiphany High School in Poona, and was the fifth woman to enroll at Presidency College of Madras, and earned a bachelor's degree there.

== Career ==
Appasamy was the All-India Woman's Secretary for the National Missionary Society, and vice-president of the Madras YWCA. Her colleagues in Madras included politician Mona Hensman and physician Muthulakshmi Reddy. She traveled all over India in her work, speaking, organizing, and raising funds. She traveled to the United States and Great Britain in 1914 with her brother J.J. Cornelius, giving lectures. She founded the Vidyodaya School at Pallavaram, a Christian boarding school for girls, in 1924. Her daughter Vimala was one of the school's first students.

In 1924 she represented India at the world committee meeting of the YWCA, in Washington, D.C. In 1926, she visited Singapore, to speak on "Ideals of Women's Education." In 1928 she wrote a biography of Pandita Ramabai, and traveled in the United States as she attended an international meeting in Detroit, Michigan.

== Personal life and family ==
Swarnam Cornelius married lawyer and judge Paul Appasamy. They had four children: Mary Vimala, John Bhasker, Esther Jaya, and Shanth Paul. Swarnam Appasamy died in her eighties in 1963, in Nangamangalam.

Economist J. C. Kumarappa was her younger brother. Bishop A. J. Appasamy, a prominent Indian Christian theologian, was her brother-in-law. Several of her children became educators. Her daughter Vimala Appasamy graduated from Mount Holyoke College, was headmistress of the Vidyodaya School from 1936 to 1965, and wrote a songbook for the school. Daughter Jaya Appasamy became an artist, writer, college professor, and Fulbright Scholar. Son S. Paul Appasamy was an educator and representative of the YMCA of India and Ceylon in the 1960s.
