= P. C. Kokila =

Indian professor of Hindi

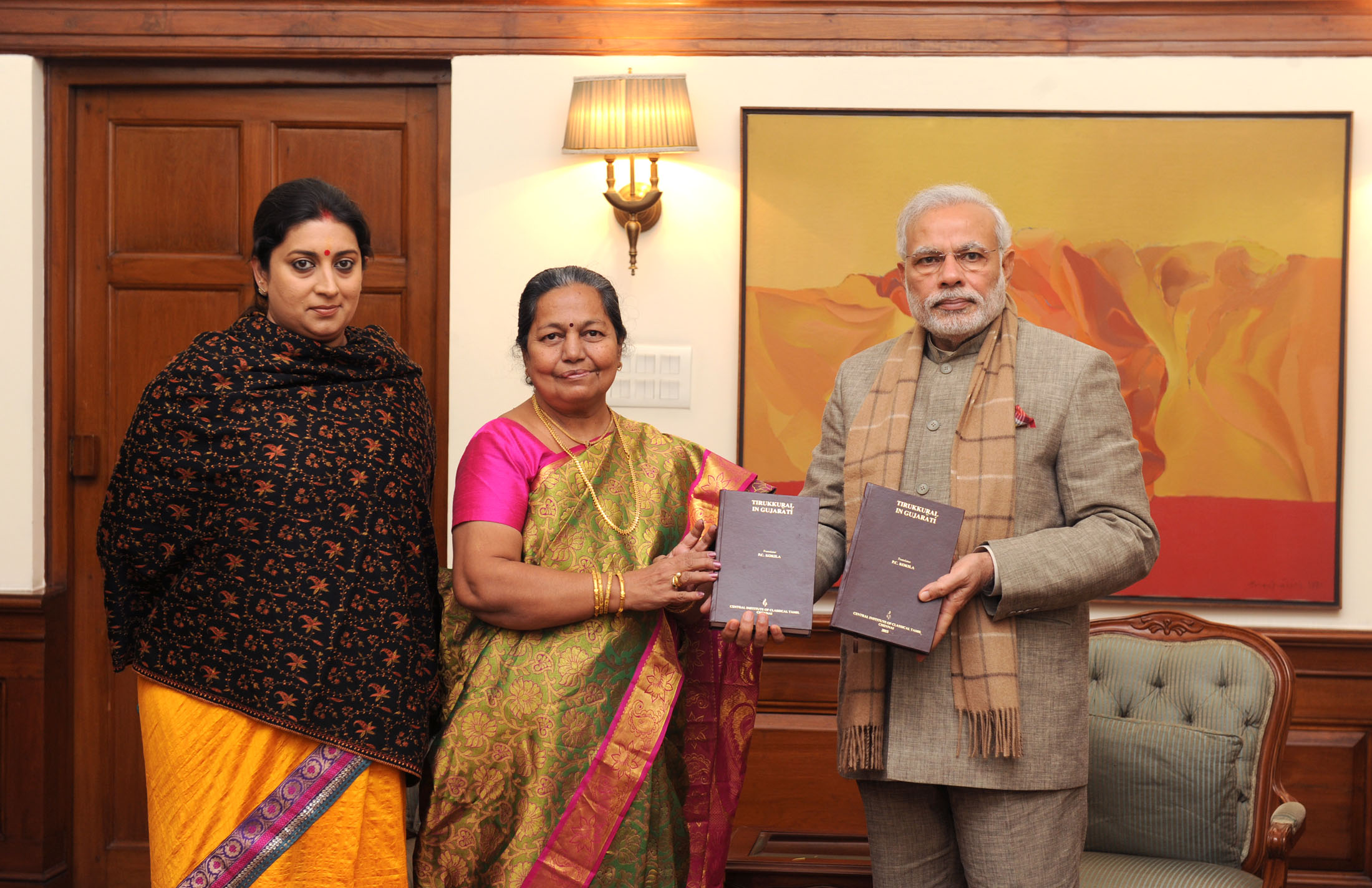
- Kokila with her Kural translation released by Prime Minister Narendra Modi in 2015
- Born: Bhavnagar, Gujarat, India
- Occupation: Professor
- Known for: Translating Tirukkural into Gujarati

P. C. Kokila is an Indian professor of Hindi, who is best known for translating the Tirukkural into Gujarati.

== Biography ==
P. C. Kokila was born in Bhavnagar in Gujarat. In 1981, she completed her bachelor's degree in mathematics from the University of Madras. She completed her MA in Hindi from the Dakshin Bharat Hindi Prachar Sabha in 1984 and went on to obtain an MPhil in 1986 and a doctorate in 1994. In 1998, she completed her MA in philosophy and religion from the Madurai Kamaraj University. She began her career in 1986 as a Hindi pradhyapika (pundit) in Hindi Teaching Scheme of the Indian government's Ministry of Home Affairs. From 1988, she has been working in the Hindi department at the Presidency College in Chennai and became the associate professor and head of the department. She has presented 24 research papers, of which 16 have been published.

Kokila translated the ancient Tamil moral work of the Tirukkural, which was published in 2015 by the Central Institute of Classical Tamil and released by the Prime Minister of India Narendra Modi. She is the second translator of the work in Gujarati, after Najuklal Choksi in 1931 and Kantilal L. Kalani in 1971.

Kokila considers the Tirukkural as the work that influenced Japanese Haiku poetry, given the similarity between the two and both being spiritual and drawing examples from nature. According to her the travelling Buddhist monks acted as the conduits between the two cultures.

== See also ==
- Tirukkural translations
- Tirukkural translations into Gujarati
- List of translators
