= K. Seshadri Iyer =

Indian advocate and Dewan of Mysore

Sir Kumarapuram Seshadri Iyer KCSI
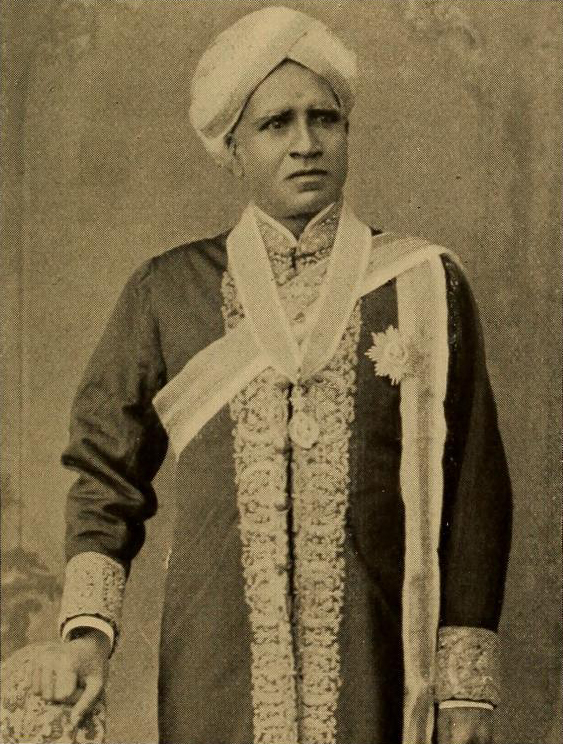

15th Dewan of Mysore
- In office 12 February 1883 – 18 March 1901
- Monarchs: Chamaraja Wodeyar, Krishna Raja Wadiyar IV
- Preceded by: C. V. Rungacharlu
- Succeeded by: T. R. A. Thumboo Chetty

Personal details
- Born: 1 June 1845 Palghat, Present day Kerala
- Died: 13 September 1901 (aged 56) Mysore, Kingdom of Mysore
- Spouse: Dharmasamvardhini (1865-1901)
- Education: Presidency College, Chennai
- Profession: Civil servant, administrator

Sir Kumarapuram Seshadri Iyer (also spelled Aiyar) (1 June 1845 – 13 September 1901), was an Indian advocate who served as the 15th Dewan of Mysore from 1883 to 1901. He was the second longest serving dewan of Mysore after Purnaiah. He is regarded by most as the maker of Modern Bangalore.

Seshadri Iyer was born in a Tamil Hindu family from Palakkad in the Malabar district of Madras Presidency (modern day Kerala). He had his early education in Calicut and graduated in arts from Presidency College, Chennai, in 1868. He was also a qualified lawyer.

Seshadri Iyer joined the services of the Mysore kingdom in 1868 and served as a district magistrate and later as Personal Secretary to the Dewan, Rungacharlu before being appointed Dewan himself. Seshadri Iyer was the longest serving Dewan of Mysore kingdom and served from 1883 to 1901.

He started the Mysore Civil Service Examinations which were held for the first time in 1891 and the Department of Geology and the Department of Agriculture were founded in 1894 and 1898. Other notable achievements include the construction of the Vanivilas Sagar dam across Vedavati river, the initiation of the Shivanasamudra hydroelectric project in 1899 (the first such major attempt in India), electricity and drinking water (the latter through pipes) being supplied to Bangalore and the founding of the Archaeological Survey of Mysore (1890) and the Oriental Manuscripts Library.

Seshadri Iyer established the Kolar gold fields and Victoria Hospital and commissioned the Shivanasamudra hydel-electric power project. Seshadri Iyer had to deal with a devastating plague which afflicted Bangalore in 1898 and was responsible for the decongestion of streets and reconstructing the city in the aftermath of the plague.

== Early life ==
Seshadri Iyer was born on 1 June 1845 to Ananthanarayanan Iyer and his second wife Venkatalakshamma at Kumarapuram near Palakkad. His great-grandfather Gowri Seshan Pattu had migrated to Kumarapuram from Ganapathi Agraharam in Tanjore district at the turn of the 19th century.

Ananthanarayanan Iyer was employed as a vakil (lawyer) in Calicut. Apart from Seshadri Iyer, he also had a son, Venkatasubba Iyer, from his first wife. Venkatasubba Iyer was also employed as a lawyer in Calicut. On Ananthakrishna Iyer's death in 1846, Venkatalakshamma and the infant Seshadri were cared for by the 20-year-old Venkatasubba Iyer.

Seshadri Iyer was educated in private until his eleventh year when he was admitted to the Free Church Mission School in Cochin. Seshadri had his higher education at the Calicut Provincial School and the Trivandrum High School from where he matriculated in first class in 1863 winning the Connoly Scholarship. Seshadri was admitted to the Presidency College, Madras where he was mentored by E. B. Powell. Seshadri graduated in 1866 emerging first in the B. A. examinations.

== Service in the Mysore Kingdom ==
In 1868, Seshadri Iyer was appointed Judicial Secretary in the Ashtagram division of the Mysore kingdom. He later served as Head Sheristadar of the Court of the Judicial Commissioner, Assistant Commissioner of Mysore, Deputy Commissioner and District Magistrate of Tumkur and District and Sessions Judge of Ashtagram division.

He obtained his B. L. degree from the University of Madras in 1874. From 1881 to 1883, he served as an officer on special duty in Mysore. In 1883, when Rangacharlu's period of service came to an end, Seshadri Iyer was appointed Dewan of Mysore.

== As Dewan ==
Seshadri Iyer succeeded Rangacharlu as Dewan of Mysore in the year 1883 and administered Mysore for a span of eighteen years. He remains the longest serving Dewan of the princely state. He worked to improve the transport, irrigation and mining sectors in the kingdom. Seshadri Iyer extended the railway lines in the kingdom by 270 kilometres (170 mi)The Kolar gold fields of Karnataka were established during his tenure. He constructed the famous Glass House at Lalbagh in 1889 and the Victoria Hospital at Bangalore in the year 1900.

=== Sir Sheshadri Hydel Station ===
Seshadri Iyer was responsible for initiating the first hydro-electric project in Asia, at Shivanasamudra, which began generating power in 1902 for the Kolar gold fields, and in 1905 for Bangalore. The gold fields were 147 km away, making the transmission line the longest in the world at the time. Later on, when construction of the Mettur dam in Tamil Nadu began in the 1930s, power was supplied from Shivanasamudra. The Sir Sheshadri Hydel Station was granted the status of a National Heritage Centre in May 2006.

=== The Maker of Modern Bangalore ===
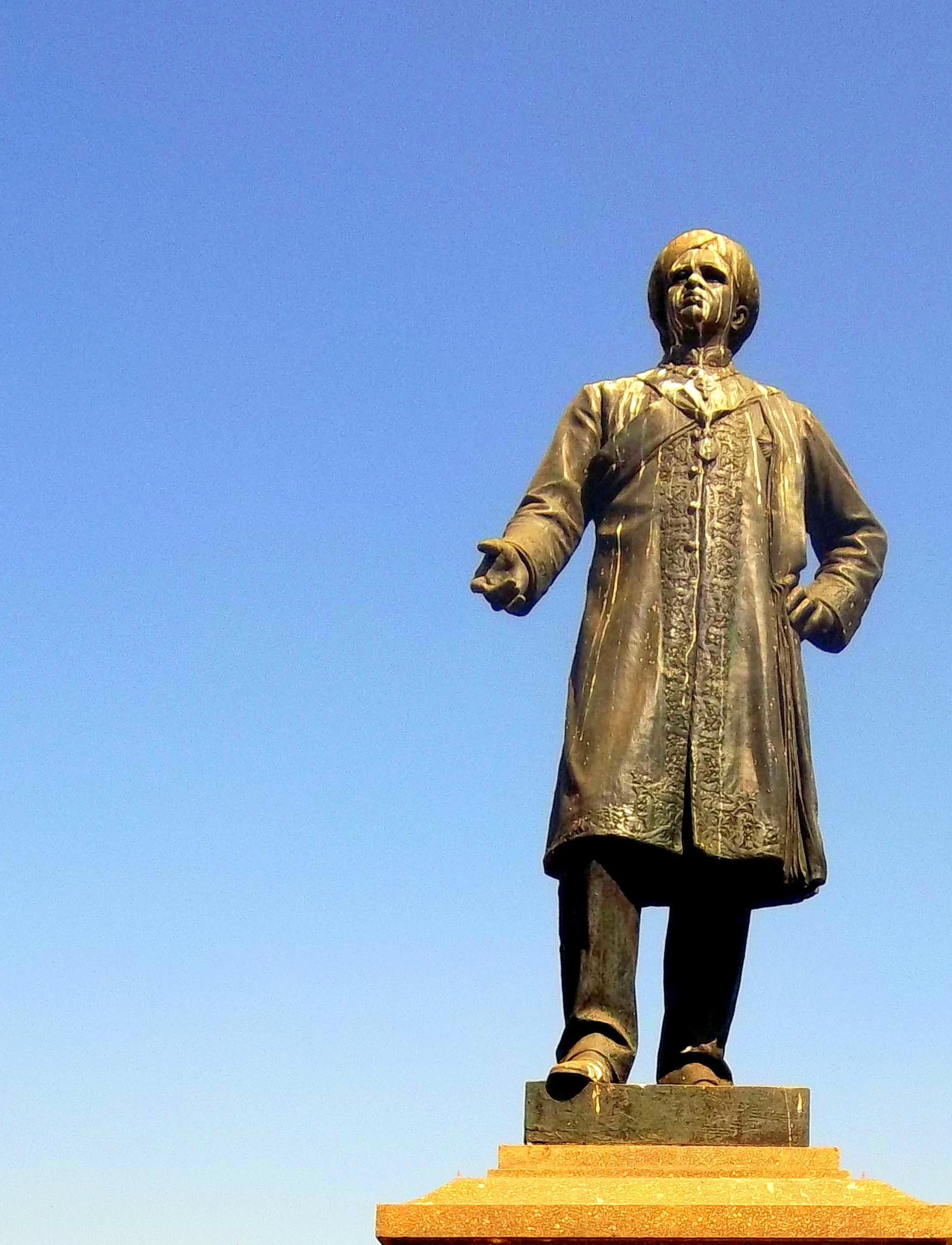
Statue of Sir K.Seshadri Iyer at Cubbon Park, Bangalore

In 1898, a plague devastated Bangalore city and wiped out a large proportion of its population. The remaining population moved into camps set up on open farmland in the countryside until the plague abated. The highly congested old city area, consisting of tiny houses built along very narrow and irregular lanes, was where most Indians lived, and this area was badly hit by the plague. The Mysore government, in consultation with the British Raj, decided to depopulate and demolish this area to prevent recurrence of plague and other infectious diseases which were common in those days. Iyer's administration developed the extensions of Basavanagudi and Malleswaram from 1898 onwards in order to house the displaced population. Housing plots were allotted and other help extended to the displaced families to enable them to build airy new houses. Not only did the extensions alleviate the congestion of the city, but also, many new industrial units came to be established in the vicinity, and people got more employment opportunities. Hotels and eateries made their first appearance. Meanwhile, the old city was demolished and developed anew. Streets were decongested, roads were widened and straightened; sanitation was improved. In 1894, Seshadri Iyer started the Chamarajendra Water Works to supply water to the city from Hesaraghatta Lake, which at that time eas 18 km outside the city.

During the plague, Iyer also observed the need for a large and well-equipped hospital which would provide treatment in the European style of medicine. The Victoria Hospital was begun by him in 1900. Previously, he had commissioned the glass house in Lal Bagh in 1889.

The private residence of Seshadri Iyer, Kumara Krupa, is now the State Guest House. The city remembers him through the names of Seshadripuram (a city extension created in 1892), Sheshadri Road, Sheshadri Memorial Library, and a statue in Cubbon Park.

== Family ==
Seshadri Iyer married Dharmasamvardhini in 1865. The couple had four sons: K. S. Doreswamy Iyer, K. S. Krishna Iyer, K. S. Viswanatha Iyer, and K. S. Ramaswami Iyer; and two daughters. Dharmasamvardhini died shortly before Seshadri's own death on 13 September 1901.

Doreswamy Iyer served as Revenue Commissioner in Mysore Civil Service. He was Private-Secretary to Seshadri Iyer from 1881 to 1891. In 1912, he was appointed Additional member of the Mysore Legislative Council. K. S. Krishna Iyer also served in the Mysore State Service rising to the post of Deputy Commissioner.

Preceded by C. V. Rungacharlu	Dewan of Mysore; 1883 to 1901	Succeeded by T. R. A. Thumboo Chetty
