= Venkataramani =

Venkataramani is a surname. Notable people with the surname include:

- K. S. Venkataramani (1891–1952), Indian lawyer
- R. Venkataramani (born 1950), Indian lawyer
