= N. S. Ramaswami =

Indian sports journalist (1918–1987)

Nallathagudi Srinivasa Ramaswami (November 1918, Cuddalore - 19 February 1987) was an Indian sports journalist who worked for four decades with The Hindu, Mail and Indian Express, and became an assistant editor at all three newspapers. He wrote four books on cricket — Winter of Content, Indian Cricket, Indian Willow and From Porbandar to Wadekar — but was also well-versed in history, social commentary and temple architecture.

Ramaswami often wrote under the pseudonyms "Cardusian" and "New Ebor", the former in honour of Neville Cardus, that doyen of cricket literature, and the latter Alfred Pullin, Victorian-Edwardian cricket correspondent for the Yorkshire Post, whose pseudonym was "Old Ebor". He was most popularly known, however, by the initials NSR. One of the most subtle and observant writers on the game, Ramaswami's work is celebrated even today. "What he lacked," wrote Suresh Menon in an otherwise laudatory piece, "was what some modern writers consider more important than style or flair — a harsh line in criticism. His writing was suggestive rather than brazen, his criticism based on larger principles rather than on passing trends."

Ramaswami studied at the PS High School in Mylapore, Loyola College in Chennai and took BA Hons in English literature from Madras Christian College. He played in the Madras leagues as a right arm off spinner for YMCA, Royapettah. He suffered a heart attack on 18 February 1987, and died the next day.

== Books ==
- Winter of Content (1967)
- Seven Pagodas: The Art and History of Mahabalipuram (1970)
- Indian Willow: A Short History of Indian Cricket (1971)
- From Porbandar to Wadekar (1975)
- Amaravati: The Art and History of the Stupa and the Temple (1975)
- Monograph on Temples of Mukhalingam (1976)
- Indian Cricket: A Complete History (1976)
- Tanjore Paintings: A Chapter in Indian Art History (1976)
- Temples of Tadpatri (1976)
- The Founding of Madras (1977)
- Indian Monuments (1979)
- Ramanathapuram District: An Archaeological Guide (1979) (with R. Nagaswamy)
- Fort St. George (1980)
- Tamil Nadu Cricket Association Golden Jubilee Commemoration Volume 1930–1980 (1980)
- A Monograph on Somapalem Temples (1981)
- The Chief Secretary: Madras Diaries of Alexander Falconar, 1790–1809 (1983) (editor)
- House of God: Select Temples of South India (1984)
- Political History of Carnatic under the Nawabs (1984)
- India's Animal-Drawn Vehicles: An Inter-Disciplinary Survey of the State of the Art, Designs and Operations (1984)
- Madras Literary Society: A History, 1812–1984 (1985)
- Pachaiyappa and His Institutions (1986)
- Parrys 200: A Saga of Resilience (1988) (with S. Muthiah)
- K. S. Venkataramani (1988)
- 2000 Years of Mamallapuram (1989) (editor)
- Indian Philosophy and Culture (1996)
