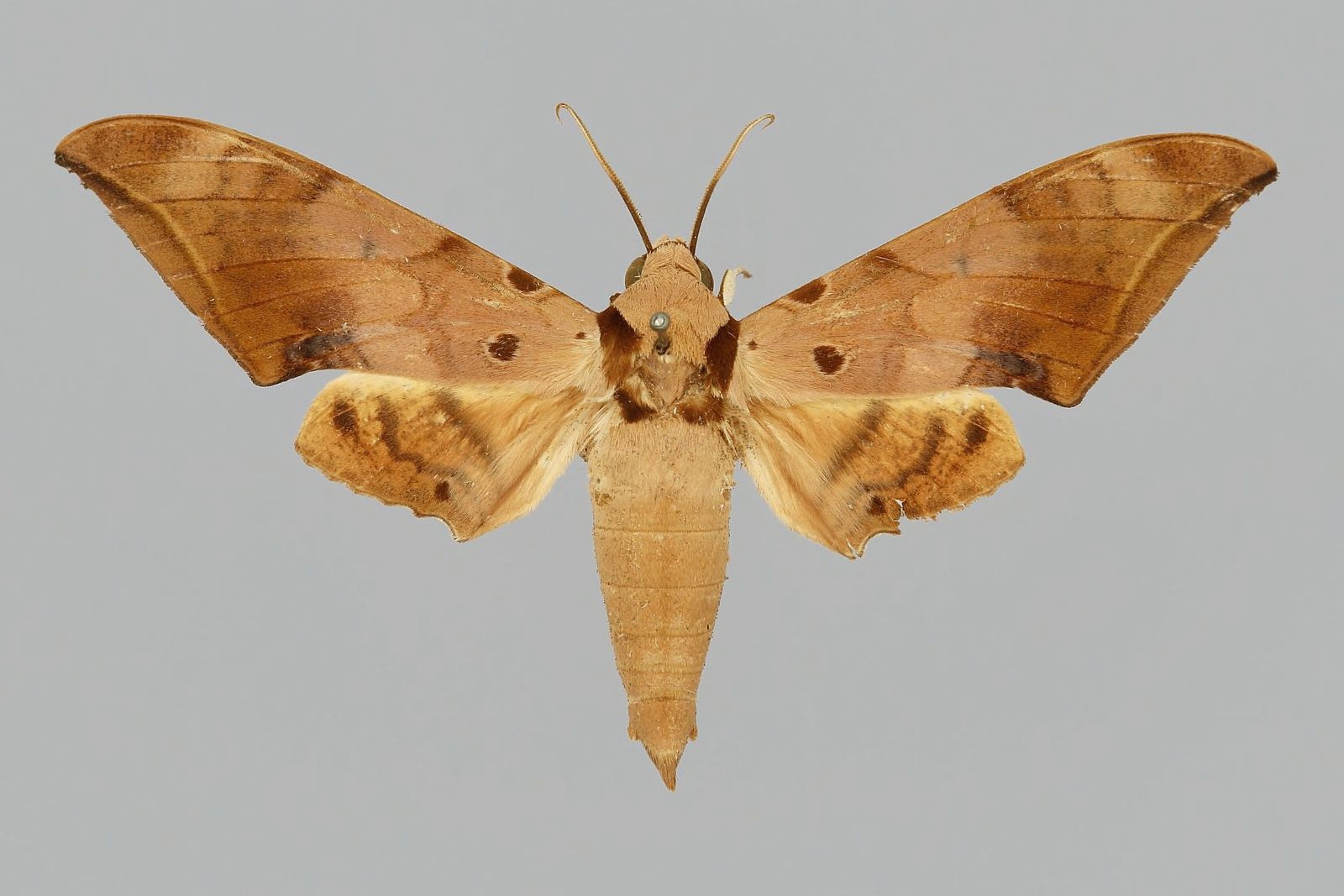
- Male, collected in Karwar, Karnataka
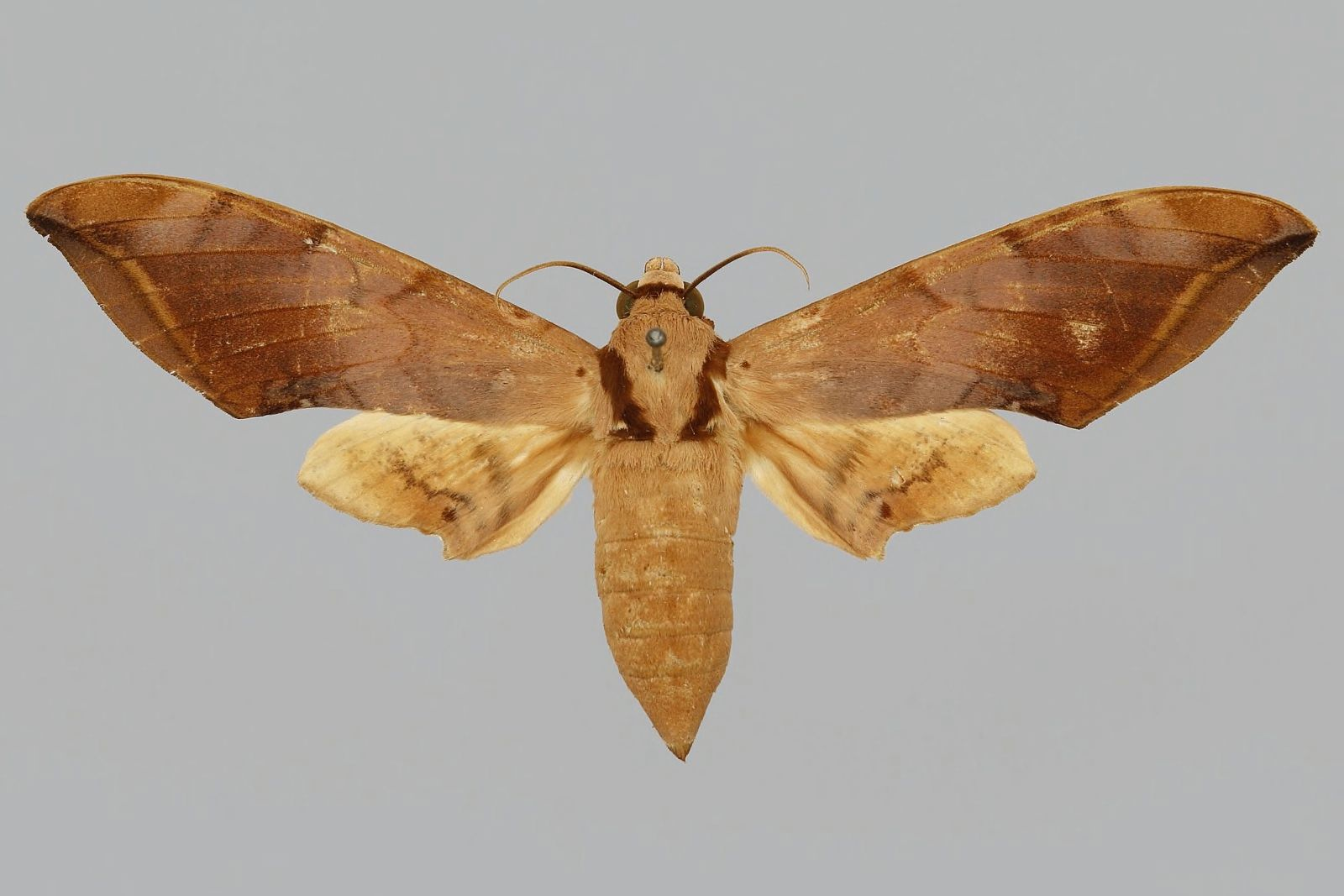
- Female, collected in Uttara Kannada

Scientific classification
- Kingdom: Animalia
- Phylum: Arthropoda
- Class: Insecta
- Order: Lepidoptera
- Family: Sphingidae
- Genus: Ambulyx
- Species: A. belli

Binomial name
- Ambulyx belli (Jordan, 1923)

Synonyms
- Oxyambulyx belli Jordan, 1923

= Ambulyx belli =

Species of moth

Ambulyx belli is a species of moth in the family Sphingidae. It was described by Karl Jordan in 1923, and is known from India. It is named after the Indian forest officer and naturalist Thomas Reid Davys Bell.
