= Harold Papworth =

Harold Charles Papworth OBE
- Born: 1888
- Died: 1953 (aged 64–65)
- Employer: Madras Presidency
- Known for: educator

Harold Charles Papworth OBE (1888–1953) was a British educator and officer of the Indian civil service who served as the Principal of the Presidency College, Madras from 1934 to 1942.

== Early life ==
Papworth was born in India on 16 December 1888. After his education, Papworth entered the Indian educational service in which he served until December 1943.

== Career ==
Papworth was appointed Principal of the Presidency College, Madras in 1934 and served till 1942. Papworth also served as the Vice-Chancellor of Travancore University from 1947 to 1949. In 1941, Papworth was made an officer of the Order of the British Empire.

== Family ==
Papworth married Gladys Emily Muirhead (1887–1965) on 26 February 1916. The couple had a daughter called Yvonne (born 1917).
