= M. Nannan =

Indian educationist and bureaucrat

- Born: 1923
- Died: 7 November 2017 (aged 94)
- Other name: Ma Nannann
- Known for: As Tamil enthusiast, Self Respect Movement, Educationist, bureaucrat and socio-political activist
- Notable work: Over 70 Tamil literature and Text Books

M. Nannan (1923 – 7 November 2017) was an Indian educationist, bureaucrat and socio-political activist. He served as a professor of Tamil at the Presidency College, Madras.

== Early life ==
Nannan was born in 1923. He lived in Saidapet then in the Chingleput district of Madras Presidency. After graduating in Tamil, Nannan presented a Tamil language coaching programme on All India Radio (AIR) from 1948 till the mid-1950s, when he was offered the post of Tamil lecturer at the Presidency College, Madras.

== Television and bureaucracy ==
During the 1980s, Nannan gave Tamil classes on Doordarshan, India's state-owned television channel. He also served as Director of Tamil Development and vice-chairman of Adult Education Board.

== Political leanings ==
Nannan was an ardent supporter of the Self Respect Movement and the Pure Tamil Movement. He has openly spoken in support of the Dravidar Kazhagam and the Dravida Munnetra Kazhagam and participated in agitations against the removal of the Kannagi statue.

== Nationlisation ==
In an event commemorating the hundredth birth year of M. Nannan at Chennai, Tamil Nadu chief minister M. K. Stalin said that the work of M. Nannan will soon be nationalised.
