= Presidency College, Chennai =

College in the city of Chennai in Tamil Nadu, India

Presidency College
- Coat of Arms
- Former names: Madras Preparatory School, Madras High School
- Motto: Unde Orta Recurrit (Latin)
- Motto in English: This inspired returns
- Type: Government College
- Established: 1840; 186 years ago
- Affiliations: University of Madras
- Principal: Dr. R. Raman
- Faculty: 249
- Students: 4099
- Undergraduates: 3280
- Postgraduates: 819
- Location: Wallajah Road, Chepauk, Chennai, India
- Campus: Urban
- Website: presidencycollegechennai.ac.in

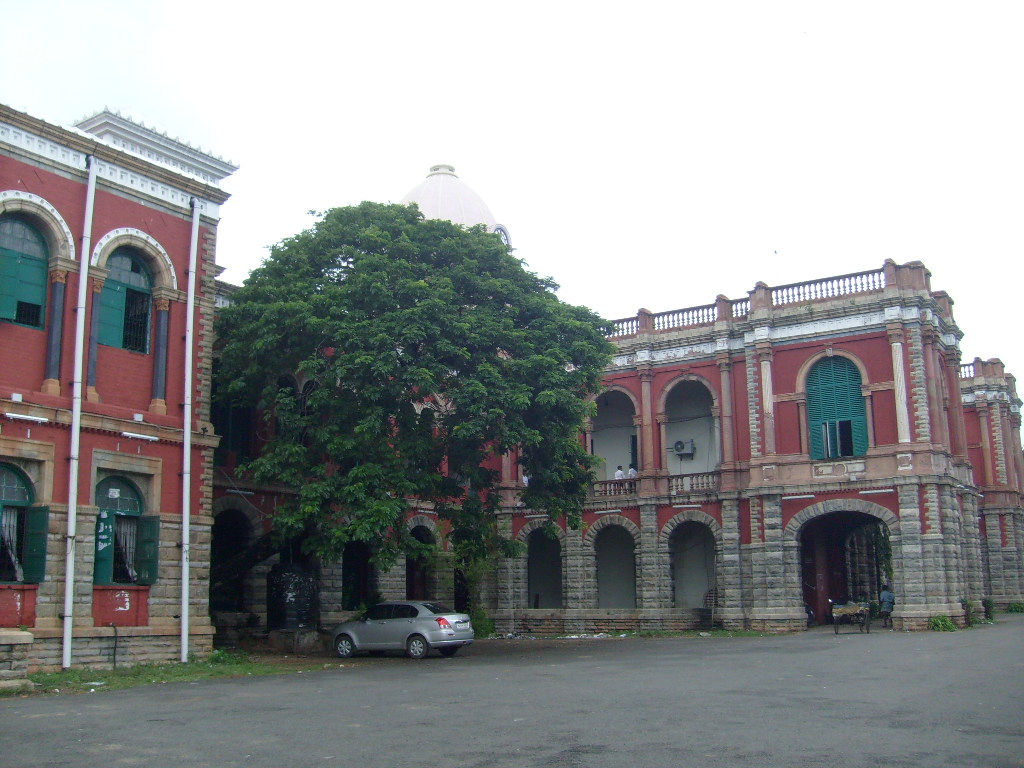
Main building of Presidency College, Chennai.

Presidency College is an art, commerce, and science college in the city of Chennai in Tamil Nadu, India. On 16 October 1840, this school was established as the Madras Preparatory School before being repurposed as a high school, and then a graduate college. The Presidency College is one of the oldest government arts colleges in India. It is one of two Presidency Colleges established by the British in India, the other being the Presidency College, Kolkata.

== History ==
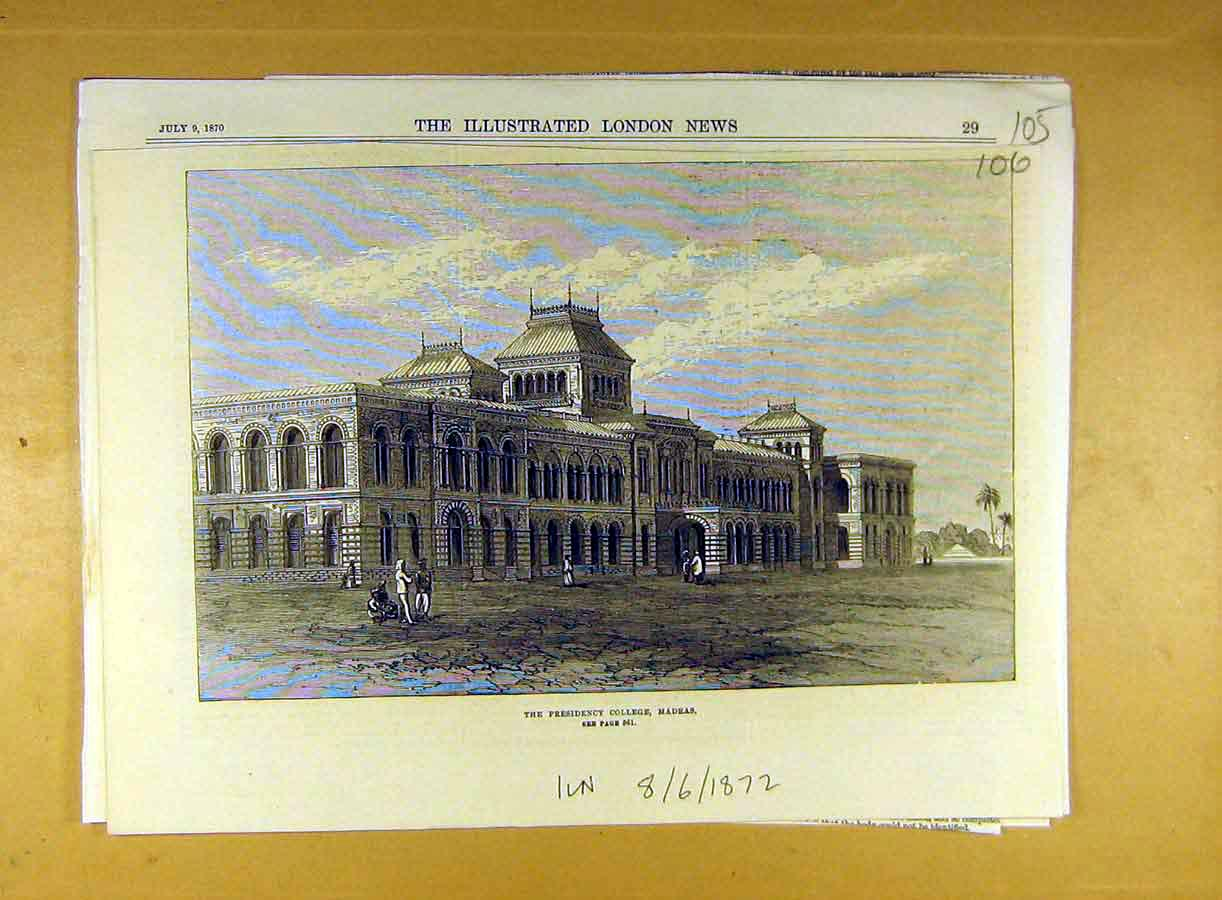
Historical photograph of the college (from the Illustrated London News, 1870)

Sir Thomas Munro asked for a Committee of Public Instruction to form in 1826. In 1836, the committee's duties changed to the "Committee of Native Education". The plans drawn up by the committee did not commend themselves to the Governor of Madras, Lord Elphinstone, who proposed nineteen resolutions that passed unanimously.

Elphinstone chose E. B. Powell, a University of Cambridge Wrangler in mathematics, to be the first principal, and Powell accepted the post. He arrived in Mumbai (Bombay) on September 20, 1840, but did not reach Chennai (Madras) until 24 November. Meanwhile, the committee had invited Cooper from Hoogly College, Kolkata, to temporarily carry out the principal duties at a salary of Rs 400 per month. Cooper accepted the invitation and came to Chennai (Madras). He and his staff opened Presidency School, a preparatory school, in a rented building in Egmore known as Edinburgh Home, on 16 October 1840. Cooper remained in the primary school for only a few months. Soon after Powell's arrival, and before the high school department opened on 12 April 1841, he returned to Kolkata. The preparatory school shifted to Popham's Broadway in 1841.

The schools grew into Presidency College. When the University of Madras was founded in 1857, Presidency College became affiliated with it.

In 1870, the college moved to its present location in Kamaraj Salai, opposite Marina Beach.

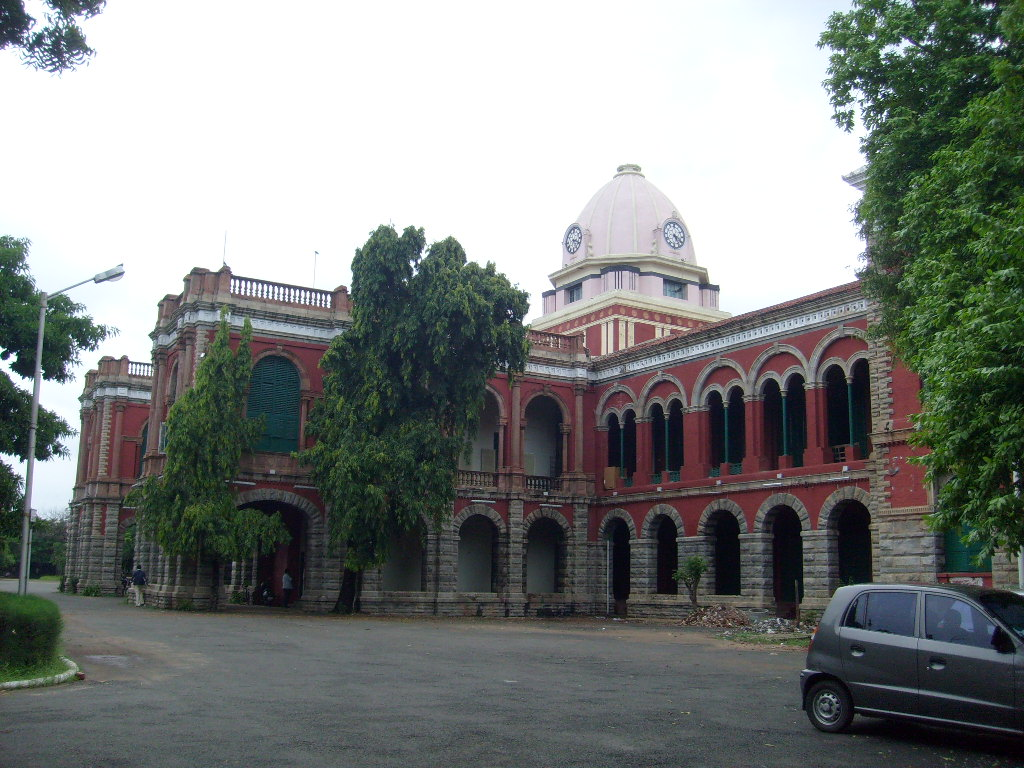
Close up view of the main entrance to the Presidency College

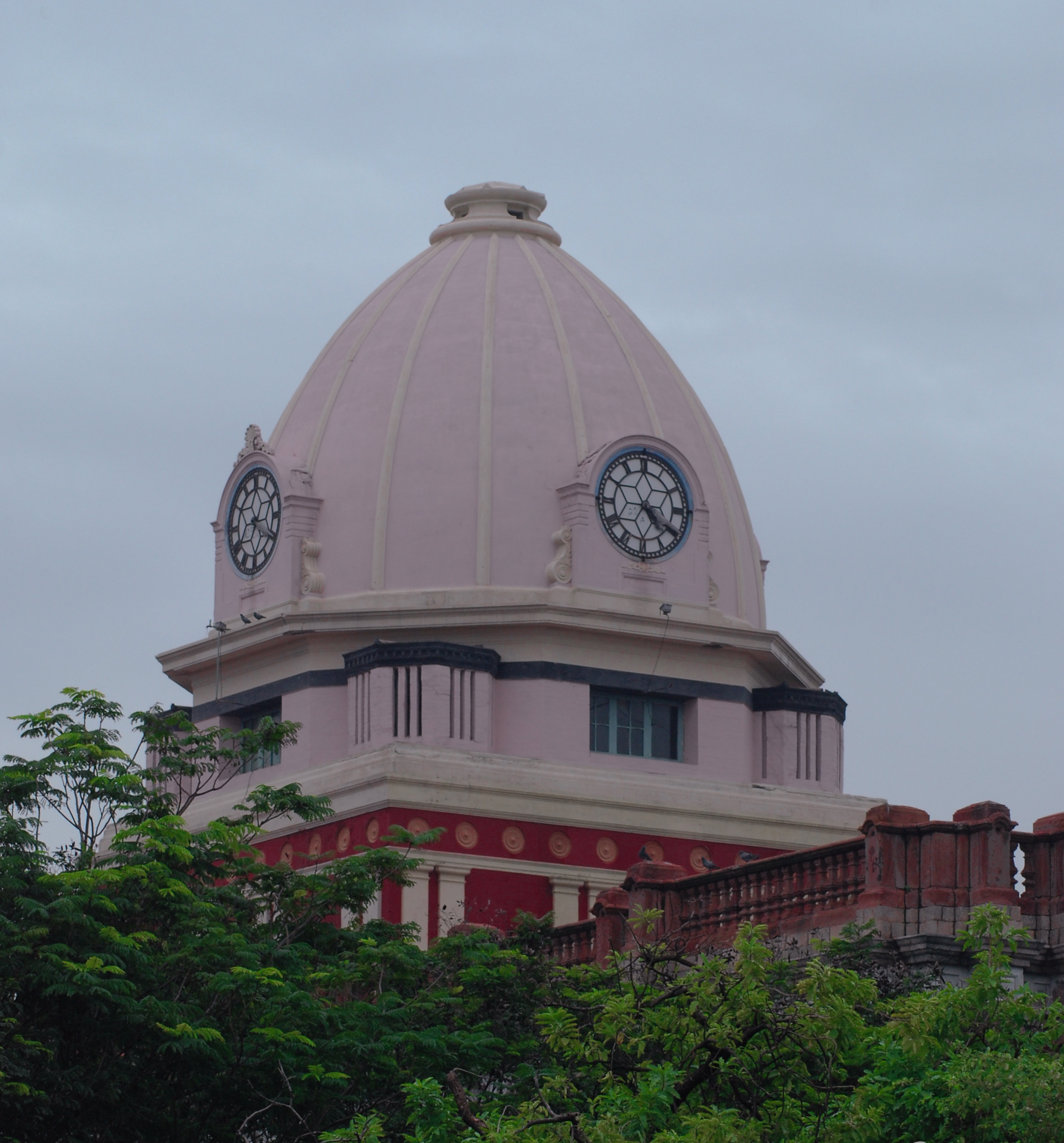
The clock tower atop the building

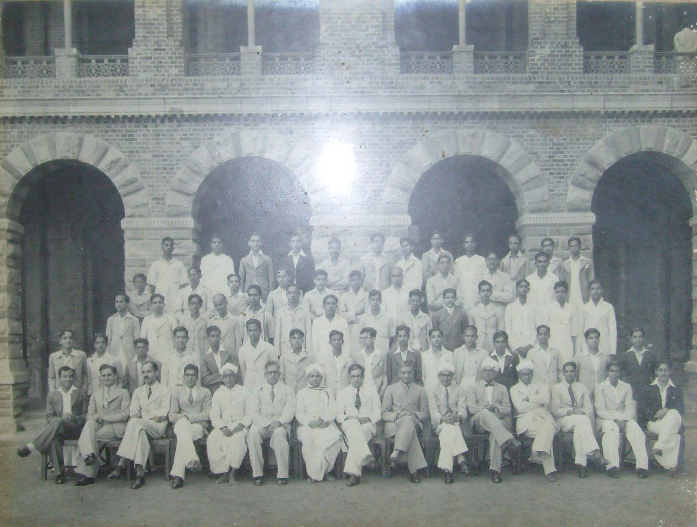
Senior Mathematics Intermediate Group, Break-up social, 3 March 1941

== Ranking ==
In the National Institutional Ranking Framework (NIRF) for the year 2023, Presidency College has been ranked 3rd again.

Presidency College is ranked third as per National Institutional Ranking Framework for colleges in the year 2022.

== Notable alumni ==
- A. L. Abdul Majeed, Sri Lankan politician and Member of Parliament
- Alagappa Alagappan (1925–2014), Indian-born American founder of the Hindu Temple Society of North America
- Alladi Ramakrishnan, Founder of Institute of Mathematical Sciences
- B. Jagannadha Das, Judge of the Supreme Court of India
- Benegal Rama Rau, Governor, Reserve Bank of India
- Bharat Ratna C. Rajagopalachari, the last Governor-General of India
- Bharat Ratna C. Subramaniam - Minister, Finance Government of India
- Bharat Ratna C. V. Raman, Nobel laureate in Physics
- C. P. Ramaswamy Iyer, Dewan of Travancore
- C. R. Pattabhiraman, Minister, Law and Company Affairs, GOI
- C. V. Runganada Sastri, interpreter, civil servant and polyglot
- C. V. Subramanian, Mycologist, Shanti Swarup Bhatnagar Prize recipient
- D. Ramanaidu, Dadasaheb Phalke award recipient and Former MP
- Diwan Bahadur Siram.Venkataramadas Nayudu, Diwan of Pudukkottai and Former Chief secretary and Magistrate of Madras Presidency.
- Dr. A. K. Viswanathan IPS
- Dr. V. Shanta, oncologist
- E. S. Appasamy (1878–1963), educator, social worker in Chennai.
- Edatata Narayanan, journalist and freedom fighter
- G. N. Balasubramaniam, Carnatic vocalist
- G. P. Pillai, freedom fighter, close aide to Gandhiji during South African Indian issue
- Gana Bala, Playback Singer
- Ganapathi Thanikaimoni, Palynologist, Fyson Prize recipient
- Gopalan Kasturi, Editor of The Hindu
- Govindarajan Padmanaban, biochemist and biotechnologist
- Janaki Ammal, Botanist and Padma Shri awardee
- K R Ramanathan, physicist and meteorologist.
- K. K. Srinivasan, founder of a pre-school for hearing-impaired children
- K. Kunjunniraja, Writer and Scholar
- K. M. Cariappa, first Commander-in-Chief of Defence Forces of independent India
- K. Rajah Iyer, Advocate-General of Madras Presidency
- K. S. Hegde, Supreme court Judge and Speaker of the Lok Sabha
- K. S. Venkataramani, lawyer and a writer in English
- K. Seshadri Iyer - Dewan of Mysore
- K. Subrahmanyam, Secretary, Defence Production, Government of India
- K. V. K. Sundaram, Chief Election Commissioner of India (1958–1967)
- K.G Subramanyan, artist. He was awarded the Padma Vibhushan
- Kadambur R. Janarthanan, Union minister of India
- Kanmani, film director
- Kasu Brahmananda Reddy, Former Chief minister Andhra Pradesh
- Kezhekapt Rukmini Menon, Second woman to be a career diplomat in India
- L. V. Ramaswami Iyer, Indian linguist
- M K Stalin, Chief Minister of Tamil Nadu
- M M Ismail, Former chief justice madras high court
- M. K. Chandrashekaran, zoologist, founder of Indian chronobiology
- M. O. P Iyengar, prominent Indian botanist and phycologist
- M. P. Periasamy Thooran
- M.B Sreenivasan - Music director
- Mithavaadi Krishnan, Social reformer
- Moorkoth Ramunny, First Malayalee pilot in the Royal Indian Air Force
- Moosa Raza
- N. Ram, managing director and Editor-in-Chief, The Hindu
- Nataraja Guru
- Nilakanta Mahadeva Ayyar, member of the erstwhile Indian Civil Service
- O. V. Alagesan, Freedom fighter and Minister of States
- O. V. Vijayan, author and cartoonist,
- P Rajagopalachari, Dewan of Cochi state and Travancore
- P. Chidambaram, Former Finance Minister of India
- P. Coomaraswamy, member of the Legislative Council of Ceylon
- P. S. Sivaswami Iyer, Law Member of the Viceroy's Executive Council
- P. S. Sivaswami Iyer, Vice chancellor Madras University
- P. Subbarayan, Chief Minister of Madras
- P. V. Rajamannar, Chief Justice Madras High Court
- Palani G. Periyasamy, businessman
- Palapatti Sadaya Goundar Kailasam, Chief Justice of Madras High Court
- Paravastu Chinnayya Soori, Telugu scholar
- Pattathuvila Karunakaran, film producer and short story writer
- Pothan Joseph, Journalist
- Psycho Muhammad, psychologist
- Pushpavanam Kuppusamy, Folk Singer
- R. K. Krishna Kumar, Former director of Tata Sons and Padma Shri awardee
- R. S. Subbalakshmi, educator and social reformer
- S. Jagannathan, Governor, Reserve Bank of India
- S. Srinivasa Iyengar, freedom-fighter
- S. Subramania Iyer, Vice chancellor Madras University
- Salim Ghouse, actor
- Santishree Dhulipudi Pandit, Vice Chancellor of Jawaharlal Nehru University
- Sarah Chakko, first woman to be elected to the presidency of the World Council of Churches.
- Sarukkai Jagannathan, tenth Governor of the Reserve Bank of India
- Sarvepalli Gopal, chairman, National Book Trust and historian
- Singaravelar, Veteran Communist leader
- Sonti Kamesam, timber engineer and scientist
- Srinivasa Varadhan, Abel Prize laureate in Mathematics
- Subrahmanyan Chandrasekhar - Nobel laureate in Physics
- Swami Atmapriyananda, monk and educator
- Syam Sudhakar, Poet, Professor
- T. Ananda
- T. J. Gnanavel, Film Director
- T. M. Nair, one of the founders of Justice Party
- T. R. A. Thumboo Chetty First Indian Chief Judge of the Chief Court of Mysore, Offg. Dewan of Mysore.
- T. R. Govindachari, chemist
- T. R. Govindachari, Natural product chemist, Shanti Swarup Bhatnagar laureate
- T. R. Seshadari, Chemist and Padma Bhushan award
- Thavamani Jegajothivel Pandian, Geneticist and Shanti Swarup Bhatnagar Prize recipient
- Thol. Thirumavalavan, Indian politician
- Toppur Seethapathy Sadasivan, Plant pathologist and Padma Bhushan awardee
- Uma Sambanthan, social activist
- V Gopalsamy (Vaiko), Former MP, Founder of MDMK
- V. K. Krishna Menon (1896–1974), Defence Minister of India (1957–1962)
- V. Kanakasabhai, lawyer and historian
- V. L. Ethiraj, philanthropist
- V. S. Chandralekha, politician and former IAS officer
- Vallal Dr. RM. Alagappa Chettiar, (1909–1957), Industrialist and Philanthropist
- Vazhakkulangarayil Khalid, Justice of the Supreme Court of India

== Notable faculty ==
- E. B. Powell
- Sarvepalli Radhakrishnan
- John Mathai
- Alfred Gibbs Mourne
- Philip Furley Fyson
- Mark Hunter (Civil Servant)
- E. W. Middlemast
- Gustav Solomon Oppert
- Harold Papworth
- Peter Percival
- A. Chakravarthi
- Paravastu Chinnayasuri
- T. R. Govindachari
- P. C. Kokila
- T. P. Meenakshisundaram
- Mu. Metha
- Chirayinkeezhu Ramakrishnan Nair
- M. Nannan
- Samuel Satthianadhan
- B. G. L. Swami
- Atoor Ravi Varma
- Perumal Murugan
- M. O. P Iyengar
- U.V. Swaminatha Iyer, Tamil scholar

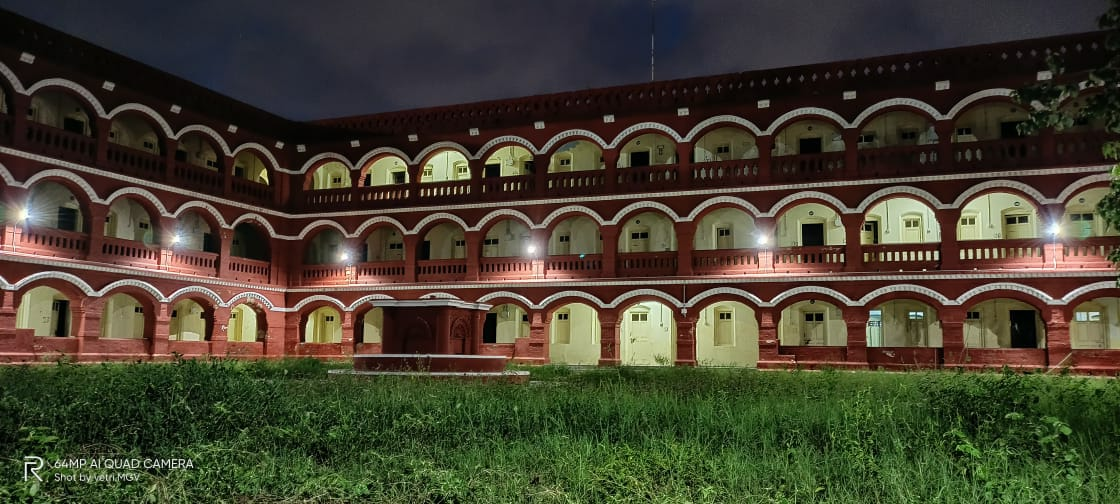
Victoria hostel

== In popular culture ==
Presidency College (mainly its campus) was the place where many films were shot, including:

- Mouna Ragam (1986)
- Iyer the Great (1990)
- Idhayam (1991)
- Thiruda Thiruda (1993), government office scenes
- Maanbumigu Manavan (1996)
- Kadhal Desam (1996)
- Sipayi (1996)
- Aaytha Ezhuthu (2004)
- Nanban (2012), hostel scenes
- The Man Who Knew Infinity (2015)
