= J. C. Kumarappa =

Indian economist (1892–1960)

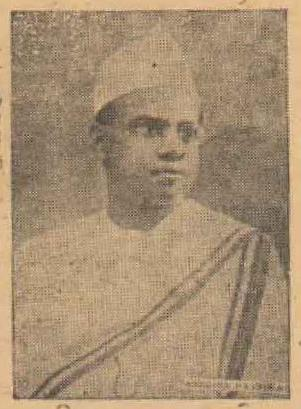
- Kumarappa in August 1931
- Born: Joseph Chelladurai Cornelius Kumarappa; 4 January 1892; Tanjore, Madras Presidency, British India (now Thanjavur, Tamil Nadu, India)
- Died: 30 January 1960 (aged 68); Madurai, Madras State (now Tamil Nadu), India
- Occupation: Economist
- Relatives: Bharatan Kumarappa (brother)

J. C. Kumarappa (born Joseph Chelladurai Cornelius) (4 January 1892 – 30 January 1960) was an Indian economist and a close associate of Mahatma Gandhi. A pioneer of rural economic development theories, Kumarappa is credited for developing economic theories based on Gandhism – a school of economic thought he coined "Gandhian economics."

== Early life and studies ==
Joseph Chelladurai Kumarappa was born on 4 January 1892 in Tanjore, present-day Tamil Nadu, into a Christian family. He was the sixth child of Solomon Doraisamy Cornelius, a Public Works officer, and Esther Rajanayagam. S.D. Cornelius, being one of the old boys of William Miller, the Principal of Madras Christian College, sent his sons JC Cornelius and Benjamin Cornelius to Doveton School and later on to Madras Christian College. After becoming followers of Gandhi, both these brothers adopted their grand father's name — Kumarappa — and were hailed as Kumarappa brothers. (For biographical details see The Gandhian Crusader: A Biography of Dr. J.C.Kumarappa, Gandhigram Trust, 1956 (rev. 1987). J C Kumarappa later on studied economics and chartered accountancy in Britain in 1919. In 1928 he travelled to the United States to obtain degrees in economics and business administration at Syracuse University and Columbia University, studying under Edwin Robert Anderson Seligman.

His older sister, Elizabeth Sornam Appasamy, became a notable educator and social worker in Madras.

== Gandhian economics ==
On his return to India, Kumarappa published an article on the British tax policy and its exploitation of the Indian economy. He met Gandhi in 1929. At Gandhi's request he prepared an economic survey of rural Gujarat, which he published as A Survey of Matar Taluka in the Kheda District (1931). He strongly supported Gandhi's notion of village industries and promoted Village Industries Associations.

Kumarappa worked to combine Christian and Gandhian values of "trusteeship", non-violence and a focus on human dignity and development in place of materialism as the basis of his economic theories. While rejecting socialism's emphasis on class war and force in implementation, he also rejected the emphasis on material development, competition and efficiency in free-market economics. Gandhi and Kumarappa envisioned an economy focused on satisfying human needs and challenges while rooting out socio-economic conflict, unemployment, poverty and deprivation. He was described by M. M. Thomas as one of the "Christians of the inner Gandhi circle" – which included non-Indians such as Charles Freer Andrews, Verrier Elwin and R. R. Keithahn, and Indians such as Rajkumari Amrit Kaur, S. K. George, Aryanayagam and B. Kumarappa, all of whom espoused the philosophy of non-violence. J. C. Kumarappa responded positively to the Indian national renaissance, and he and George rejected the idea that British rule in India was ordained by divine providence

Kumarappa worked as a professor of economics at the Gujarat Vidyapith in Ahmedabad, while serving as the editor of Young India during the Salt Satyagraha, between May 1930 and February 1931. He helped found and organise the All India Village Industries Association in 1935; and was imprisoned for more than a year during the Quit India movement. He wrote during his imprisonment, Economy of Permanence, The Practice and Precepts of Jesus (1945) and Christianity: Its Economy and Way of Life (1945).

== Environmentalism ==
Several of Gandhi's followers developed a theory of environmentalism. Kumarappa took the lead in a number of relevant books in the 1930s and 1940s. He and Mirabehn argued against large-scale dam-and-irrigation projects, saying that small projects were more efficacious, that organic manure was better and less dangerous than man-made chemicals, and that forests should be managed with the goal of water conservation rather than revenue maximisation. The British and the Nehru governments paid them little attention. Historian Ramachandra Guha calls Kumarappa, "The Green Gandhian," portraying him as the founder of modern environmentalism in India.

== Later life ==
After India's independence in 1947, Kumarappa worked for the Planning Commission of India and the Indian National Congress to develop national policies for agriculture and rural development. He also travelled to China, eastern Europe and Japan on diplomatic assignments and to study their rural economic systems. He spent some time in Sri Lanka, where he received Ayurvedic treatment. He settled near Madurai at the Gandhi Niketan Ashram, T.Kallupatti (a school based on Gandhian education system) constructed by freedom fighter and Gandhian follower K. Venkatachalapathi, where he continued his work in economics and writing.

He died on 30 January 1960, the 12th death anniversary of Mahatma Gandhi, aged 68. After his death the Kumarappa Institute of Gram Swaraj was founded in his honour. His elder brother Bharatan Kumarappa was also associated with Gandhi and the Sarvodaya movement.

== Select works by Kumarappa ==
- Public Finance and Our Poverty; Navajivan, Ahmedabad; 1930, p. 110
- Christianity: Its Economy and Way of Life; Navajivan, Ahmedabad; 1945, p. 124.
- Grinding of Cereals; Maganwadi, Wardha; 1947, p. 15
- Village Industries; Maganwadi, Wardha; 1947, p. 72.
- Clive to Keynes; Navajivan, Ahmedabad; 1947, p. 44.
- Swaraj for the Masses; Hind Kitab Ltd. Bombay; 1948, p. 104
- Europe Through Gandhian Eyes; Maganwadi, Wardha; 1948, p. 29
- Peace and Prosperity; Maganwadi, Wardha, 1948, p. 37.
- Economy of Permanence Part II; Maganwadi, Wardha; 1948, p. 87.
- Stone Walls and Iron Bars; Maganwadi, Wardha; 1949, p. 21.
- Present Economic Situation; Maganwadi, Wardha; 1949, p. 151.
- The Gandhian Economy and Other Essays; Maganwadi, Wardha; 1949, p. 120
- An Economic Survey of Matar Taluka; Gujarat Vidhyapeeth; 1952, p. 155.
- Lessons from Europe; Sarva Seva Sangh Prakashan, Wardha, 1954, p. 49
- Why the Village Movement; Sarva Seva Sangh Prakashan, Rajghat, Varanasi 221001, 1958, p. 203.
- Gandhian Economic Thought; Sarva Seva Sangh Prakashan, Rajghat, Varanasi 221001, 1962, p. 94
- Cow in Our Economy; Sarva Seva Sangh Prakashan, Rajghat, Varanasi 221001, 1963, p.: 76
- Economy of Permanence; Sarva Seva Sangh Prakashan, Rajghat, Varanasi 221001, 1984, p. 208
- Swadeshi; Sindhu Publication; 1992, p. 32.
