= Palani G. Periasamy =

Indian businessman

Palani G Periasamy
- Born: Muthugapatti Village, Namakkal, Tamil Nadu
- Education: M.A & M.A — Economics in Presidency College, Madras; PhD in Economics from University of Pittsburgh, US
- Occupation: Founder — Chairman of PGP Group of Companies
- Spouse: Visalakshi Periasamy

Palani G Periasamy is an Indian industrialist and educationalist. He is chairman of Chennai-based PGP group of companies.

== Businesses ==
Periasamy operates the PGP Group of companies. This includes Dharani Sugars & Chemicals Limited shares in which are traded on the Chennai, BSE and NSE stock exchanges. Other past and present ventures include Dharani Finance Limited, Dharani international Sourcing & Trading, Dharani Developers Limited and Appu Hotels Limited, primarily a vehicle for acquisition of hotels.

Dharani Cements Limited was formerly in the group. Established in Ariyalur District, it was later sold to the Aditya Birla Group.

He was honoured with Padmashree Ma.Po.Si award for the year 2012.
