= T. R. A. Thumboo Chetty =

Indian lawyer

Rajadharma Pravina T. R. A. Thumboo Chetty CIE
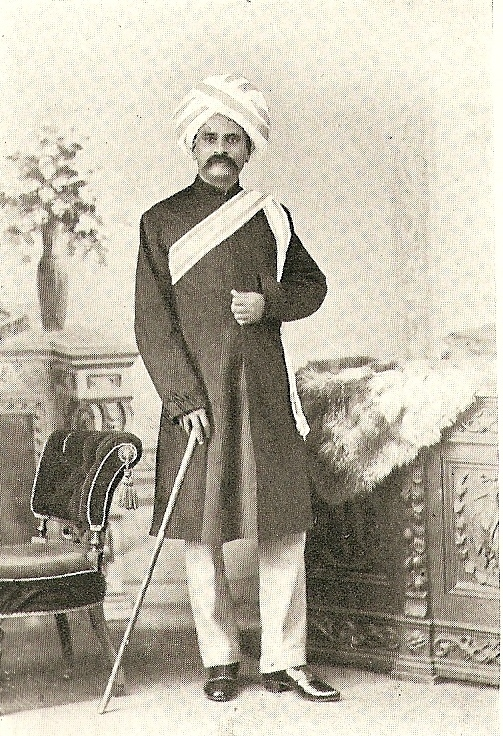
- Mr. Thumboo Chetty as District and Sessions Judge, Nundidroog Division

District and Sessions Judge Nandidroog Division
- In office 1879–1884
- Governors-General: Sir Arthur Havelock, Lord Oliver Russell

Senior Member of the Council of His Highness the Maharaja of Mysore
- In office 1881–1895
- Monarchs: Chamarajendra Wadiyar X, Krishnaraja Wadiyar IV

Judge Chief Court of Mysore
- In office 1884–1890
- Monarch: Chamarajendra Wadiyar X

Chief Judge of the Chief Court of Mysore
- In office 1890–1895
- Monarchs: Chamarajendra Wadiyar X, Krishnaraja Wadiyar IV

Senior Member of the Regency Council of Mysore of Her Highness the Regent Maharani.
- In office 1895–1901
- Monarchs: Maharani Kempa Nanjammani Devi, Krishnaraja Wadiyar IV

Acting Dewan of Mysore
- In office 11 August 1900 – 18 March 1901
- Monarch: Krishnaraja Wadiyar IV
- Preceded by: Sir K. Seshadri Iyer
- Succeeded by: Sir P. N. Krishnamurti

Personal details
- Born: Trichinopoly Rayalu Arakiaswamy Thumboo Chetty; April 1837 Trichinopoly, Madras Presidency
- Died: 19 June 1907 Bengaluru, Kingdom of Mysore
- Spouse: Rajamma Thumboo Chetty (1848-1934)
- Education: Madras Christian College; Presidency College, Chennai
- Occupation: Public Servant, First Indian Chief Judge of the Chief Court of Mysore, Offg. Dewan of Mysore
- Profession: Dewan of Mysore, Justice

Trichinopoly Rayalu Arakiaswamy Thumboo Chetty (April 1837 – 19 June 1907) was an Indian lawyer, administrator, and statesman who was the acting dewan of Mysore and later the first Indian-born chief judge of the Chief Court of Mysore (now High Court of Karnataka).

== Family ==
Thumboo Chetty was born in April 1837 to a Catholic family, apparently in Trichinopoly, to Desayi Royalu Chetty Garu, a chief bookkeeper in Griffith's and Co., in a mercantile firm, and Catherine Ummah, a woman of piety, mildness, courtesy and serenity. Thumboo Chetty's forebear, Gowri Koolapathi Kampal Naidu from Kottapalayam, originally practiced Hinduism. Kampal Naidu marked the initiation of Catholicism within the family when he converted to the Catholic faith through the efforts of Saint Francis Xavier in 1545. This historical event is documented in the initial Baptism Register of the Kottapalayam Church at Mettur in Salem District.

Thumboo Chetty was the sixth child in his family; he had three elder sisters and one younger brother and a sister, all of whom lived long enough to see his progress and advancement. He spent his early life in Black Town (now known as George Town), Madras.

Thumboo Chetty married Rajamma, daughter of Ponnoo Chettiar and Sinnammalle, Church of the Blessed Virgin Mary of Refuge, Pophan’s Broadway, Madras. The couple had four sons: T. Rayaloo Chetty, T. Dharma Raj Chetty, T. Sathya Raj Chetty, and T. Thumboo Chetty; and four daughters: Amarapatty Amma, Sathiavathy Amma, Dhanavathy Amma, and Baghavathy Amma. Thumboo Chetty's granddaughter (daughter of T. Thumboo Chetty) was the world-renowned violinist Philomena Thumboochetty.

== Public office in Mysore Kingdom ==
Sir K. Seshadri Iyer was the dewan of Maharaja Chamaraja Wadiyar. During his premiership, Thumboo Chetty officiated for him on three occasions, in 1890, later in 1892, and 1893.

| Preceded by K. Seshadri Iyer | Dewan of Mysore; 1900 to 1901 | Succeeded by P. N. Krishnamurti |
