= Tirukkural translations into Gujarati =

As of 2015, there were at least three Gujarati translations available of the Tirukkural.

== Background ==
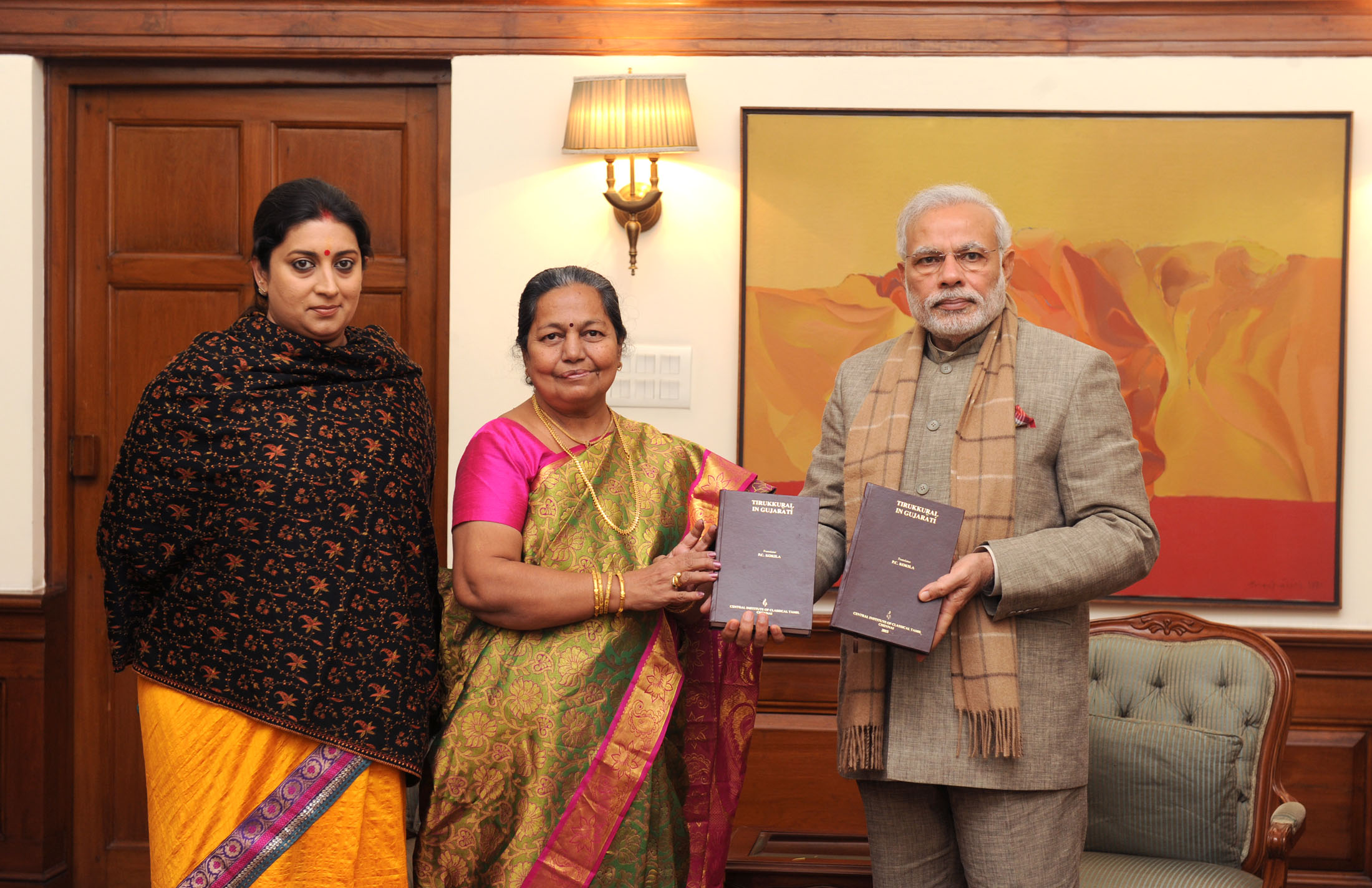
Indian Prime Minister Narendra Modi releasing a Gujarati translation of the Kural in 2015

The Kural remained unknown to the people of Gujarat during the medieval period as none has made any reference to the work in their writings. The Kural became more known to Gujarati people during the period of the Indian Independence movement after Mahatma Gandhi frequently made reference to the work in his speeches, after he was introduced to it by Leo Tolstoy.

The first Gujarati translation of the Kural text was made by Najuklal Choksi in 1931 and was published by Sastu Sahitya Vardhak Karyalaya under the title Updeshsaraamgrahs. The work was suggested by Swami Akhandanand Sarwati, the founder of Sastu Sahitya Vardhak Karyalaya. The second translation appeared in 1971 by Kantilal L. Kalani, published by the University Grantha Nirman Board of Gujarat government. Kantilal, however, translated only 852 couplets, which included only select couplets (of four to ten) from every chapter yet covering all chapters of the Tirukkural. This was republished in 1985 by Sardar Patel University, Vallabh Vidhyanagar, Gujarat.

In 2015, a complete translation by P. C. Kokila was released by Prime Minister Narendra Modi. It was published by the Central Institute of Classical Tamil, Chennai.

== Translations ==
| Translation | Chapter 26, માંસાહાર-વર્જન | |
| Translation | Kural 254 (Couplet 26:4) | Kural 258 (Couplet 26:8) |
|---|---|---|
| P. C. Kokila, 2015 | દયાભાવ છે કોઈ પણ જીવનો વધ ન કરવો; દયાહીનતા છે જીવવધ અને માંસ ભક્ષણ અધર્મ છે. | નિર્ભ્રમ (તત્ત્વ) જ્ઞાની કરતો નથી મિક્ષણ માંસનું (કારણ કે) તે છે જીવન-હનનથી છિન્ન થયેલ મૃત્ત શરીર. |

== See also ==
- Tirukkural translations
- List of Tirukkural translations by language

== Published Translations ==
- P. C. Kokila (Trans.). (2015). Tirukkural in Gujarati. Chennai: Central Institute of Classical Tamil. 405 pages. ISBN 938174419X, 978-93-81744-19-2
