= Kizhakkepat Rukmini Menon =

Indian diplomat

Kizhakkepat Rukmini Menon (6 September 1922 – 23 December 2009) was an Indian diplomat, and the second woman to be a career diplomat for the Indian Foreign Service. She was also the first female officer to be enrolled at India's National Defence College.

== Career ==
Menon was born in Kerala, and studied in Bengaluru. She completed her post-graduate education at Presidency College, Chennai, and the London School of Economics. She was the first woman officer to be enrolled in India's National Defence College, and the second woman to be a career diplomat in India, after C B Muthamma. In 1949, she started working in the High Commission of India in London, and joined the Indian Foreign Service, and served as the Indian ambassador to several countries, including Australia, Canada, Italy, Denmark, and Nigeria. Following her retirement from the foreign service, she was a member on the selection board of the Union Public Service Commission in India. Her husband was musicologist and critic Raghava Menon. She died on 23 December 2009 in Bengaluru.

During her career, Menon contributed to academic journals on subjects relating to Indian history and foreign relations.
