= Shanti Swarup Gupta (economist) =

Indian economist and academic administrator (1929–2018)

- Born: January 1, 1929; Mainpuri
- Died: 2018 (aged 89)
- Citizenship: Indian

Academic background
- Education: Agra University

Academic work
- Discipline: Gandhian economics
- Institutions: Agra University
- Notable works: Integrated Development Plan for India (1992); Economic Philosophy of Mahatma Gandhi (1994)

Shanti Swarup Gupta (1929–2018) was an Indian economist, author, and academic administrator. He served as the vice-chancellor of Agra University and was a prominent scholar of Gandhian economics and rural development strategy.

Gupta is best known for his 1992 work, Integrated Development Plan for India, in which he proposed decentralized governance models and integrated socioeconomic frameworks based on the concept of Ānanda (permanent happiness) rather than purely material metrics.

== Early life and education ==
Born in Mainpuri on January 1, 1929, Gupta was educated in India, eventually earning his M.A., Ph.D., and D.Litt. degrees in economics from Agra University. His academic work was deeply influenced by Indian culture and the sociopolitical climate of the post-independence era.

== Career ==
Gupta spent the majority of his teaching career at the Dharam Samaj Post-Graduate College in Aligarh, where he served as principal for 37 years. In this capacity, he influenced regional educational policy, later publishing Planning for Academic Excellence (1992) which was cited by the National Council of Educational Research and Training (NCERT) as a resource for institutional planning. During his tenure, he became a member of the executive council of Agra University and held several regional administrative roles, including director of the principal's workshop and secretary of the principal's association.

He was subsequently appointed as the vice-chancellor of Agra University. As an administrator, he was known for advocating for academic excellence and decentralized academic planning.

== Economic and social philosophy ==
Gupta's scholarship focused on the intersection of economics, ethics, and traditional Indian social structures. In his writings on Mahatma Gandhi, he argued that economic self-sufficiency was a moral imperative for both individuals and the nation. His work The Economic Philosophy of Mahatma Gandhi (1968, revised 1994) is cited as a significant contribution to the study of non-violent economic models, and has been described as a significant attempt to systematize Gandhi's disparate economic remarks into a cohesive academic framework. His views on Indian development were cited by Nobel laureate Gunnar Myrdal.

In Varna, Castes and Scheduled Castes (1991), he provided a historical documentation of the caste system in India, analyzing the position of the Scheduled Castes within the constitutional framework of India.

== Selected bibliography ==
- Gupta, Shanti Swarup (1991). Varna, Castes, and Scheduled Castes: A Documentation in Historical Perspective. Concept Publishing Company. ISBN 9788170223177.
- Gupta, Shanti Swarup (1992). Integrated Development Plan for India: Goal, Tools, and Strategies. Concept Publishing Company. ISBN 9788170224112.
- Gupta, Shanti Swarup (1992). Planning for Academic Excellence. Concept Publishing Company Pvt. Ltd. ISBN 9789354393907.
- Gupta, Shanti Swarup (1994). "Preface". Economic Philosophy of Mahatma Gandhi. Concept Publishing Company. ISBN 9788170225485.
