= Alfred Gibbs Bourne =

English zoologist, botanist and educator

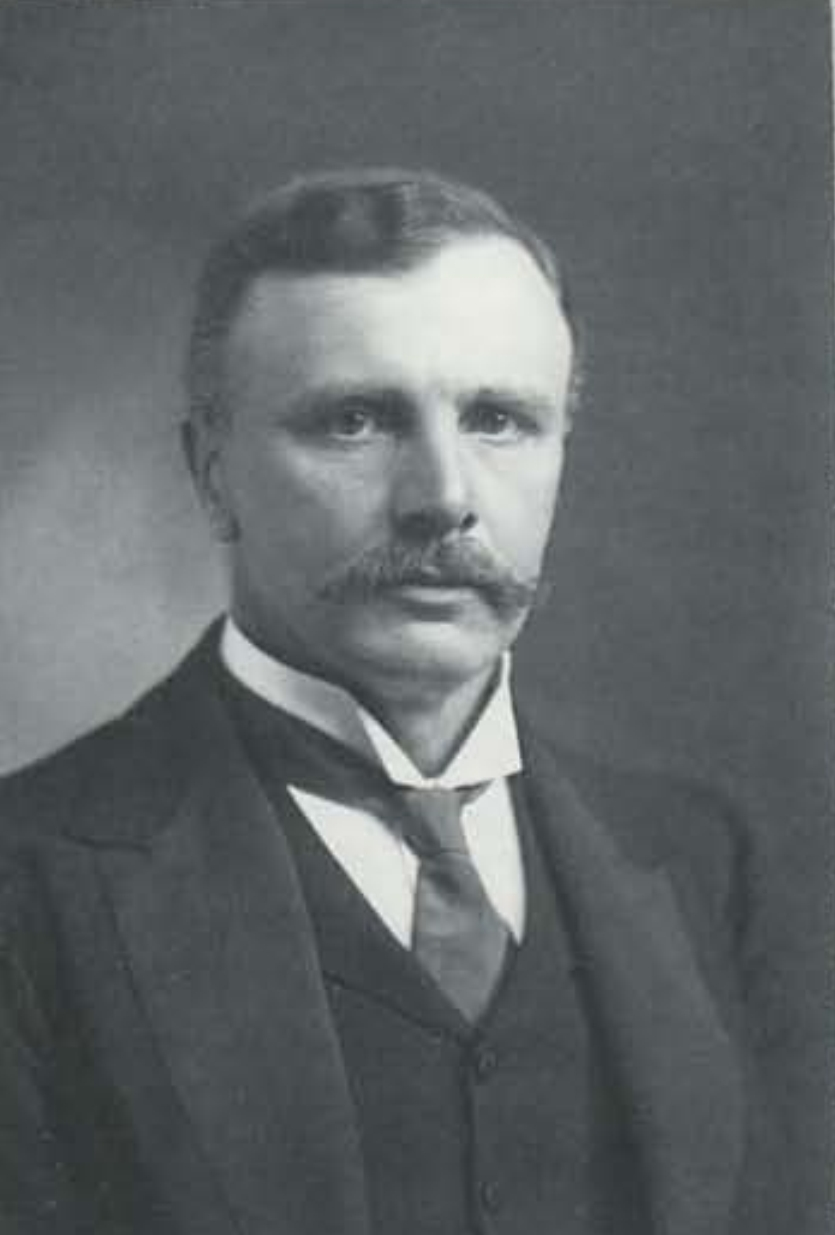
- Born: 8 August 1859; Lowestoft
- Died: 14 July 1940 (aged 80); Dartmouth, Devon
- Scientific career
- Fields: Zoology, Botany
- Workplaces: Presidency College, Madras; Indian Institute of Science

Sir Alfred Gibbs Bourne KCIE FRS FLS DSc (8 August 1859 – 14 July 1940) was an English zoologist, botanist and educator who worked in India.

== Life and work ==
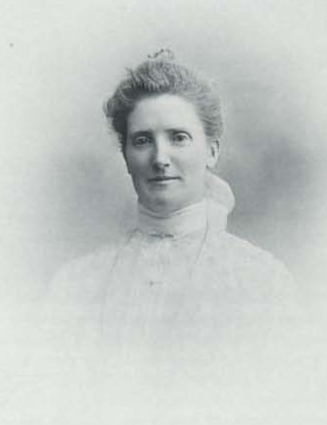
Lady Bourne

Bourne was born in Lowestoft, the son of Rev. Alfred Bourne, secretary of the British Foreign School Society. He joined the University College School after a liberal home education. Along with his contemporary Sydney J. Hickson, he was fascinated by the lectures of Ray Lankester. He later joined the University College in 1876 and attended the Royal School of Mines. In 1886, he went to Madras to join the Presidency College as Professor of Biology. He held this position until 1898 although he also held the positions of Registrar and Superintendent of the Madras Government Museum.

He was elected a Fellow of the Royal Society in 1895.

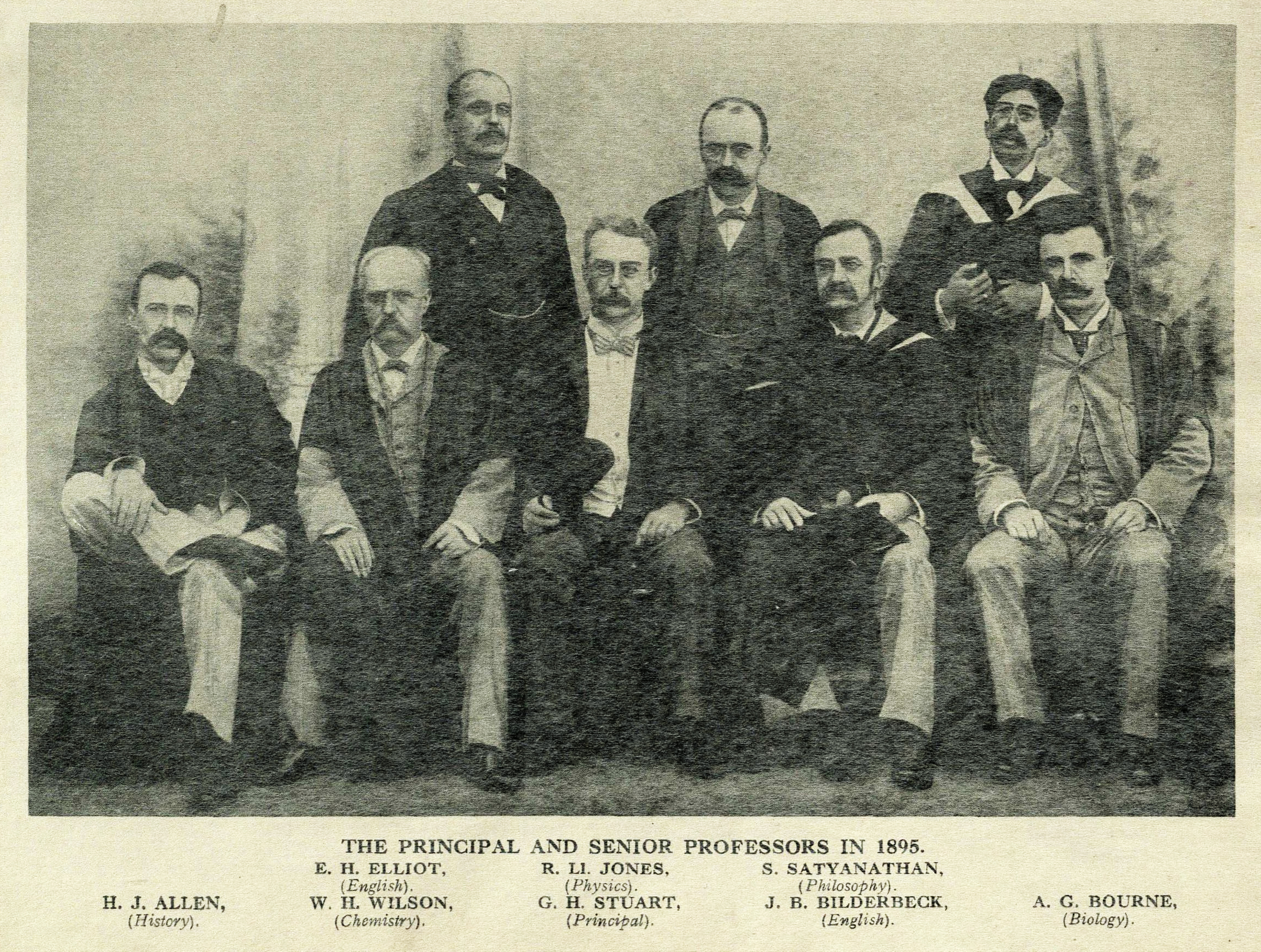
Bourne in 1895 at the Presidency College, Madras. Seated extreme right

In 1903 he was made Director of Public Instruction and he worked on changes in the secondary education system, being responsible for the introduction of the Secondary School Leaving Certificate System. After his retirement, he took charge as director of the Indian Institute of Science, holding this position from 1915 to 1921. He was knighted as a Knight Commander of the Order of the Indian Empire in 1913.

He married Emily Tree Glaisher (or Glashier in some sources) in 1888. Lady Bourne (died 18 September 1954) was an acclaimed botanical artist and she teamed up with other artists at Kodaikanal to produce illustrations of the local flora. These illustrations were used in The Flora of the Nilgiri and Pulney Hill-tops by Philip Furley Fyson. A daughter married Stephen Cox of the Indian Forest Service. Bourne died in 1940 in Dartmouth, Devon.
