= K. Kunchunniraja =

Indian academic

- Born: K. Kunjunni Raja; 26 February 1920; Nadathara, Kerala, India
- Died: 30 May 2005 (aged 85)
- Education: Presidency College, Chennai, Madras University, London School of Oriental Studies
- Occupation(s): Writer, scholar

K. Kunjunni Raja (February 26, 1920 – May 30, 2005) was an Indian writer and scholar in Kerala.

== Biography ==
He was born in February 1920 in Nadathara in Thrissur district in Kerala. After his schooling at St. Thomas H.S. Thrissur he joined St. Thomas college there for higher studies. He had his further studies at Presidency College, Madras, Madras University and London School of Oriental Studies from where he received an M.A and two PhDs. He joined as lecturer at Govt. College, Chittoor, worked in various government colleges and then in 1951 joined Department of Sanskrit, Chennai University. After retirement worked as honorary director of Adayar library. He has also functioned as a member of Central Film Censor Board and in the advisory council of Kendra Sahitya Academy. He knew more than five languages including Prakrit and German. He has to his credit 30 books and more than 150 articles in Malayalam and English. He died in May 2005 at the age of 85.

== Works ==
- Malayalam
- Londonil
- Bhasha chinthakal
- BhashaGaveshanam
- English
- Indian Theories of Meaning
- Contribution of Kerala to Sanskrit Literature
