= James Davidson (ornithologist) =

James Davidson FZS (28 March 1849 – 25 June 1925) was a Scottish naturalist in colonial India. He studied birds and many aspects of Indian natural history during his career in the Indian Civil Service, mostly posted in the Bombay Presidency and central India.

Davidson was born at Maryhill near Glasgow to William James Davidson and Harriet, daughter of Mark Sprot. His early education was at St Andrews in the private school of Mr Douglas before he went to study followed by studies at Glasgow and Edinburgh Universities. He qualified in the Indian Civil Services in 1872 and served in the Bombay Presidency until 1897. For his work during the famine years around 1876–78, he received a special award from the government. He retired to Edinburgh, Scotland.

During his service in India, he wrote extensively about the birds of the regions of present-day Uttara Kannada, Satara and Belgaum, corresponding with Allan Octavian Hume, to whom he gave his bird collection. His method included the use of local lads (including the Bhils) who located bird nests for him. He wrote numerous notes to Stray Feathers, the Journal started by Hume as well as to the journal of the Bombay Natural History Society. Just before his retirement, he made a trip to Kashmir with the lepidopterist and forest officer Thomas Reid Davys Bell. He was a member of the British Ornithologists' Union from 1883.

== Publications ==
- Davidson, J. (1898) A short trip to Kashmir. Ibis, 7:1-42.
- Davidson, J. (1886) Bird nesting on the ghats. Journal of the Bombay Natural History Society 1(4):175-183.
- Davidson, J. (1885) Notes on the birds of Khandeish and Nasik. Vol. 1. 2 vols. Unpublished manuscript in BMNH archives, Tring, U.K.
- Davidson, J. (1908) On the nesting habits of the Small Indian Spotted Eagle Aquila hastata. Journal of the Bombay Natural History Society. 18(3):682-683.
- Davidson, J. (1904) The eggs of the Small Sun-bird Arachnothera minima. Journal of the Bombay Natural History Society. 15(4):726.
- Davidson, J. (1898) The birds of North Kanara. Journal of the Bombay Natural History Society. 11(4):652-679.
- Davidson, J. (1898) The birds of North Kanara. Part II. Journal of the Bombay Natural History Society. 12(1):43-72.
- Davidson, J.; Bell, T R; Aitken, E H (1898). Butterfly Life in the Tropics of India. Psyche. Volume 8. Cambridge Entomological Club. pp. 177–179.
- Davidson, J.; Bell, T R; Aitken, E H (1897). The butterflies of the North Canara District of the Bombay Presidency. IV. The Journal of the Bombay Natural History Society. Vol. 11. Mumbai: Bombay Natural History Society. pp. 22–63.
- Davidson, J.; Bell, T R; Aitken, E H (1896). The butterflies of the North Canara District of the Bombay Presidency. I, II, III. The Journal of the Bombay Natural History Society. Vol. 10. Mumbai: Bombay Natural History Society. pp. 237–259, 372–393, 568–584.
- Davidson, J. (1895) The birds of the Bombay Presidency. Journal of the Bombay Natural History Society. 9(4):488-489.
- Davidson, J. (1891) Notes on nidification in Kanara. Journal of the Bombay Natural History Society. 6(3):331-340.
- With E.H. Aitken (1890) Notes on the larvae and pupae of some of the butterflies of the Bombay Presidency Journal of the Bombay Natural History Society. 5:260-286, 349–375.
- Davidson, J. (1882) Rough list of the birds of western Khandesh. Stray Feathers. 10(4):279-327.
- Davidson, J. (1880) Letters to the Editor. Stray Feathers. 9(1,2&3):236.
- Davidson, J. (1879) Letters to the Editor. Stray Feathers. 8(2-5):414.
- Davidson, J. (1879) Letters to the Editor. Stray Feathers. 8(2-5):415-416.
- Davidson, J. (1878) Letters to the Editor. Stray Feathers. 7(1-2):172.
- Davidson, J. (1874) Letters to the Editor. Stray Feathers. 2(1,2&3):336.
