= Thomas Reid Davys Bell =

Irish lepidopterist and forestry officer

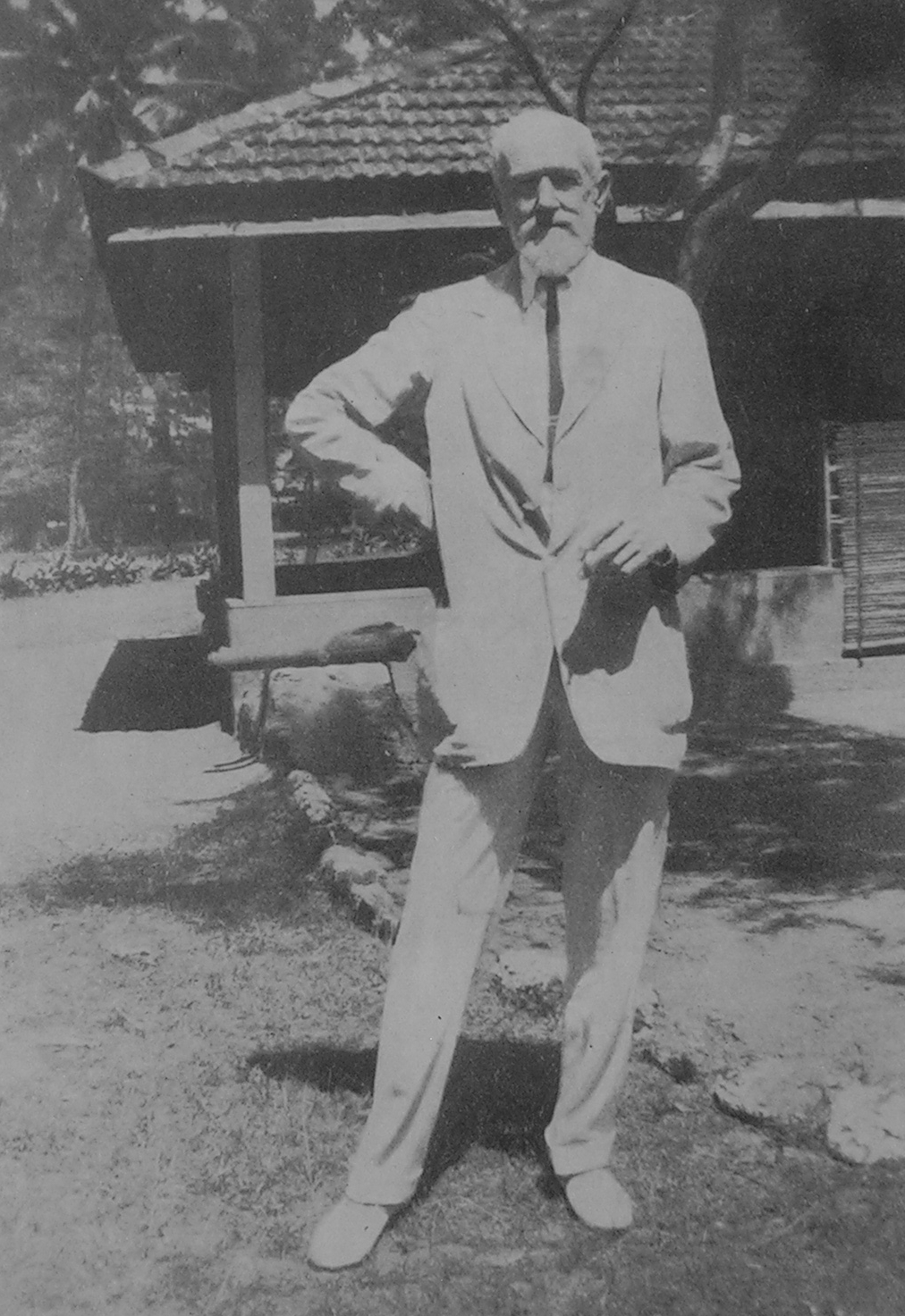
ThomasRDBell at "Gudehalli" Bungalow, Karwar.

Thomas Reid Davys Bell (2 May 1863 – 24 June 1948) was a lepidopterist, naturalist and forest officer who worked in India. Bell collected natural history specimens, studied birds and the life histories of butterflies and moths in his spare time. His large collection of entomological specimens are held at the Natural History Museum, London. A number of species have been named from his collections, several commemorating him.

== Life and work ==
Bell was born in Bandon, Cork. Thomas was the youngest in a family of twelve. His mother left Ireland and moved to Dresden where he received his early education. He went to London for tuitions at Wren and Gurney to enter the Indian Civil Services but failed. He later wrote entrance exams to Sandhurst and Woolwich and passed but decided not to join the army. He passed the entrance for the Indian Woods and Forest Services, trained at Nancy and joined the services at Dharwad in 1884, as a Deputy Forest Officer. Here he was trained under the conservator Colonel William Henry Peyton (1830–1892), with whom he went on tiger shoots. He was also in touch with Edward Hamilton Aitken who was in the salt and excise department and James Davidson, collector of the district and along with these keen naturalists he began to study the Lepidoptera.

In 1896 Davidson, then retired, invited Bell to join him on a trip to Kashmir. This raised his interest in the birds of India. He also made collections of beetles which he passed on to H. E. Andrewes at the British Museum at the end of the 1890s. He was in Sind between 1905 and 1906 but returned to Belgaum. Davidson had moved back to Edinburgh and he moved to live at Karwar, North Kanara District, Bombay, India. A series on the common butterflies of India was started in the Journal of the Bombay Natural History Society by L.C.H. Young, but discontinued due to his ill-health. Walter Samuel Millard contacted Bell and suggested that he complete the series and Bell reluctantly took up this task. He reared many lepidoptera specimens from larvae collected in the field and published on a variety of topics including a volume (1937) on the Sphingidae (having reared nearly 80 Indian species) in The Fauna of British India, Including Ceylon and Burma in collaboration with Major F. B. Scott (who was in Assam). He corresponded with Karl Jordan and Lord Rothschild on hawkmoths. In 1911 he was made CIE.

He became a Chief Conservator of Forests, Bombay Presidency in 1913, a position he held until his retirement in 1920. He worked on the grasses of the North Kanara region with L. J. Sedgwick, the collection now at St. Xavier's College in Bombay. Sedgwick and Bell founded the Journal of Indian Botany with P.F. Fyson as editor. Later he also took an interest in the orchids and his sister made illustrations of them. He joined a timber business at Sawanthwadi along with a partner who left him with significant financial losses. In 1930 he gave his entire collection of insects to the British Museum (Natural History). It had 3000 specimens of butterflies, 12000 moths, 1900 Coleoptera, 1720 Hymenoptera and 20 Orthoptera. In 1936 he worked on his moth collection at the natural history museum with Willie Horace Tams. Several insect species have been described from his collections and named after him. These include:

- Acmaeodera belli Kerremans, 1893
- Ambulyx belli (Jordan, 1923)
- Idgia belli Gorham, 1895

Bell was unmarried, and in 1937 he moved to Lucerne along with his brother to stay with their sisters. Later that year, he and his sister Eva moved to live in Karwar. They took an interest in orchids and Eva painted pictures of their flowers. Eva stayed with him until her sudden death in 1941. After her death his health declined and in 1946 a niece, Letty Bell, joined him from Switzerland. Bell's health however declined and he died in 1948 at Karwar.
