= L. V. Ramaswami Iyer =

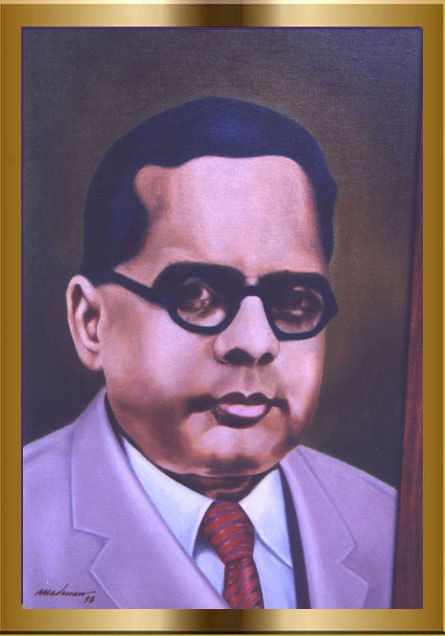

L. Vishwanatha Ramaswami Iyer (25 October 1895 – 31 January 1948), popularly known as L. V. R, was an Indian linguist who specialized in Dravidian languages. He is remembered as a pioneer of Malayalam and Tulu linguistics.

== Personal life ==
Ramaswami Iyer was born in Trichur to L. R. Vishwanatha Iyer, a retired Inspector of schools with the Department of Public Instruction, Cochin State. Ramaswami Iyer had his early schooling in Trichur and completed his intermediate from the Maharajah's College, Ernakulam in first class.

Iyer graduated in geology from the Presidency College, Madras in 1914 and in law from the Madras Law College in 1916. Iyer practised as a lawyer at Trichur and Ernakulam before joining the Education Department of the Cochin service and worked as a school teacher at Kunnamkulam and Ernakulam. In 1922, Iyer completed his master's degree in English and joined the faculty of Maharajah's College, Ernakulam as professor.He taught for 25 years at Maharajah's College in Ernakulam.

In December 1947, in deteriorating health, he took sick leave and succumbed to diabetes on 31 January 1948.
