= Philomena Thumboochetty =

Indian violinist

- Philomena Thumboochetty in the 1930s
- Born: 1913; Bangalore
- Died: 2000 (aged 86–87)
- Other names: Philomena Tambu Chetti
- Occupation: Violinist
- Relatives: T. R. A. Thumboo Chetty (grandfather)

Philomena Rukmavathy Thumboochetty (10 October 1913 – March 2000) was an Indian violinist. She was the first Indian musician admitted to the Conservatoire de Paris.

== Early life and education ==
Philomena Thumboochetty was born in Bangalore and educated in Mysore, the daughter of Sir T. Thumboo Chetty, OBE and Selvavathy (Lady Gertitude Thumboo Chetty). Her father was the private secretary to the Maharaja of Mysore, her grandfather Sir T. R. A. Thumboo Chetty was the First Indian Chief Judge of the Chief Court of Mysore and the Offg. Dewan of Mysore. Her family was Roman Catholic. She attended the Calcutta School of Music, before gaining a fellowship to Trinity College London. At the age of 16, she was the youngest candidate, and the first candidate from India, admitted to the Conservatoire de Paris, After finishing her course at the Conservatoire de Paris, she became the pupil of Romanian violinist Georges Enesco.

== Career ==
Thumboochetty was "one of the first Indian women to achieve distinction as a violinist." She and her mother were presented to King George V and Queen Mary in 1934. In 1935, she gave her a concert at London's Aeolian Hall. Returning to India in 1935, she gave a concert at the Jaganmohan Palace, accompanied by the Palace Orchestra, before an audience that included the Maharaja and his party. In 1937, she played with the Calcutta Symphony Orchestra. Also that year, a short biography appeared, The Indian Fiddler Queen: A Short Sketch of Philomena Thumboochetty. In 1938, she was guest soloist at the Calcutta School of Music's Fifth Symphony Concert, heard live on All India Radio.

After marriage and children, Thumboochetty gave concerts in Bangalore, but did not tour; "she continued to practice three hours a day almost to the end of her life," according to her son. She played with the Max Mueller Bhavan Orchestra in the 1960s and 1970s. She also taught violin; one of her successful students was Grammy-winning violinist and composer Manoj George. Thumboochetty was also a strong chess player.

== Personal life ==
Thumboochetty married Francis Kantaraj Thumboochetty in 1937. Mirza Ismail gave a speech at their wedding. They had five children, including her first daughter, Chitra, who was born with a hearing impairment. Philomena Thumboochetty died in 2000. Her family's Thumboochetty Foundation sponsors two concerts a year in her memory.
