= Kantilal L. Kalani =

Indian philosopher (1930–1998)

- Born: 1930
- Died: 1998 (aged 67–68)
- Occupations: Philosopher, writer in Gujarati literature
- Known for: Translating Tirukkural into Gujarati

Kantilal L. Kalani (1930–1998) was an Indian philosopher and writer in Gujarati literature. He is best known for translating the Tirukkural into Gujarati.

== Biography ==
Kantilal Kalani worked with the United States Information Service as head of the Department of Gujarati for 25 years. He wrote over 65 books in Gujarati on philosophy and spiritual knowledge. In 1971, he translated the ancient Tamil moral literature of the Tirukkural into Gujarati, which was published in Bombay.

== Works ==
- Hasatamramatam Hari Malya (1992), published by Gurjara Grantharatna Karyalaya
- Song of the Soul (with Indravadan C. Shah)
- Jivansanket (Gujarati edition)
- Atmabodhana
- Santa Tukarama Antarangano Asvada
- Anantarabhayo Ujasa
- Upanishadonum Acamana
- Amrtanum Acamana: Urdhva Darsana
- Brahmasukhano Anubhava
- Romaromamam Diva
- Atmadipa
- Jivanani Mavajata
- Mahabharat
- Tirukkural

== See also ==
- List of Gujarati-language writers
- Tirukkural translations
- Tirukkural translations into Gujarati
