= K. S. Venkataramani =

Kaveripatnam Siddhanatha Venkataramani (1891-1952) was an Indian lawyer and a writer in English. He wrote mainly on South Indian rural life and the Indian independence movement. His works Murugan the Tiller (1927) and Kandan The Patriot (1932) had received considerable appreciation and Venkataramani was the subject of a biography by N. S. Ramaswami. Venkataramani was met by Paul Brunton during his travels in India and this incident finds mention in his book A Search in Secret India.

== Early life ==
Venkataramani was born in 1891 in Kaveripattinam in Tanjore district. His father Siddhanatha Iyer was a well-to-do landlord in Tanjore district and his ancestors had served as ministers in the court of the Tanjore Maratha kings.

Venkataramani had his schooling at the National High School, Mayavaram and graduated from the Madras Christian College. He studied law at the Presidency College, Madras and settled down in the suburb of Mylapore where he built a profession as a lawyer.

In his early career, Venkataramani apprenticed under the legal giant Sir C. P. Ramaswami Iyer. Throughout his life, Venkataramani campaigned for rural upliftment and wrote many monologues on the subject.

== Writings ==
Venkataramani had a penchant for writing from an early period in his life. At the age of 16, he gave an eloquent speech protesting the Partition of Bengal and the same was published in the magazine The Indian Patriot. During his stint at the Madras Christian College, Venkataramani published a series of sketches on village life which were later published in the form of an anthology Jatadharan and Other Stories.

Venkataramani met Rabindranath Tagore in 1928. Tagore inspired Venkataramani to start a magazine in Tamil and Venkataramani began a Tamil weekly titled Tamil Ulagu.

Venkataramani's first book was Paper Boats (1921). His first novel was Murugan the Tiller (1927). His work Kandan the Patriot was serialized in Swarajya magazine in 1931 and published as a book in 1932. In his works, Venkataramani glorified the "eddy-eyed Cauvery".

Some of his works were

- Paper Boats (1921)
- On the Sand-Dunes (1923)
- Murugan the Tiller (1927)
- Renascent India (1929)
- Kandan the Patriot (1932)
- Jatadharan and Other Stories (1937)

== Death ==
Little is known of Venkataramani's personal life or whether he married. Venkataramani contacted tuberculosis in Alwar State while working as Rural Development Advisor to the princely state and was subsequently in poor health throughout the remainder of his life. Venkataramani succumbed to the disease in March 1952 at the age of 61.
