= E. B. Powell =

British educationist (1819–1904)

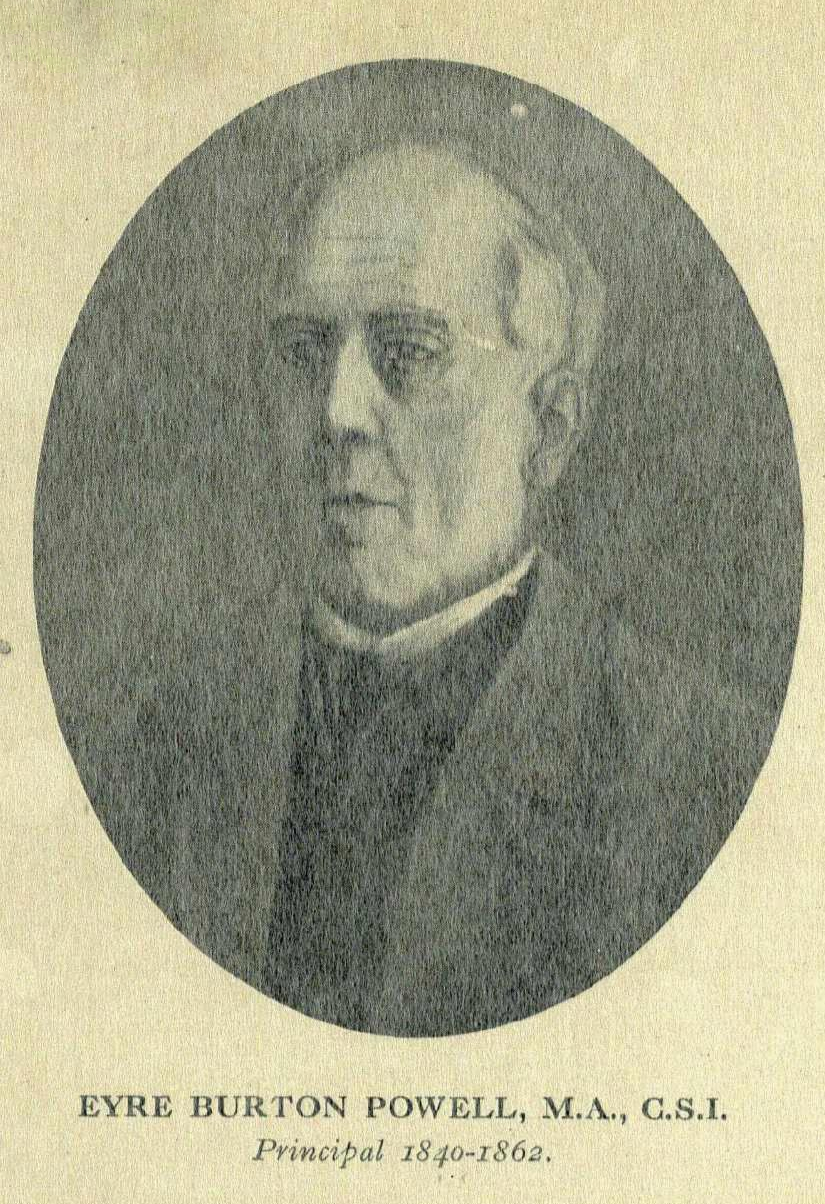
Portrait of Eyre Burton Powell

Eyre Burton Powell CSI (1819 - 10 November 1904) was a British educationist who served as the first Principal of the Presidency College, Madras.

== Biography ==
Powell was born in 1819 to Eyre Burton Powell and educated at Pembroke College, Cambridge, where he graduated BA as 31st Wrangler in 1840. He left for Madras in 1848 to join as a clerk in the High School, Madras, later rising to become headmaster and eventually, Principal, when the school was elevated to the status of a college. Powell was appointed Director of Public Instruction for the Madras Presidency in 1862 and served from 1862 to 1875.

In 1866, Powell was made a Companion of the Order of the Star of India. He died on 10 November 1904. Powell's statue is present in the campus of the Presidency College, Madras.

== Legacy ==
Powell is remembered for his accomplishments as the first Principal of the Presidency College, Madras and for pioneering Western education in the Madras Presidency. Some of his protégés include C. V. Runganada Sastri, Sir A. Seshayya Sastri, Sir T. Madhava Rao and V. Ramiengar.
