= Gandhian economics =

Economic system of Mahatma Gandhi

Gandhian economics is a school of economic thought based on the spiritual and socio-economic principles expounded by Indian leader Mahatma Gandhi. It is largely characterised by rejection of the concept of the human being as a rational actor always seeking to maximize material self-interest that underlies classical economic thinking. Where Western economic systems were (and are) based on what he called the "multiplication of wants," Gandhi felt that this was both unsustainable and devastating to the human spirit. His model, by contrast, aimed at the fulfillment of needs – including the need for meaning and community. As a school of economics the resulting model contained elements of protectionism, nationalism, adherence to the principles and objectives of nonviolence and a rejection of class war in favor of socio-economic harmony. Gandhi's economic ideas also aim to promote spiritual development and harmony with a rejection of materialism. The term "Gandhian economics" was coined by J. C. Kumarappa, a close supporter of Gandhi.

== Gandhi's economic ideas ==
Gandhi's thinking on what we would consider socia-secular issues (he himself saw little distinction between the sacred and its expression in the social world) was influenced by John Ruskin and the American writer Henry David Thoreau. Throughout his life, Gandhi sought to develop ways to fight India's extreme poverty, backwardness, and socio-economic challenges as a part of his wider involvement in the Indian independence movement. Gandhi's championing of Swadeshi and non-cooperation were centred on the principles of economic self-sufficiency. Gandhi sought to target European-made clothing and other products as not only a symbol of British colonialism but also the source of mass unemployment and poverty, as European industrial goods had left many millions of India's workers, craftsmen and women without a livelihood.

By championing homespun khadi clothing and Indian-made goods, Gandhi sought to incorporate peaceful civil resistance as a means of promoting national self-sufficiency. Gandhi led farmers of Champaran and Kheda in a satyagraha (civil disobedience and tax resistance) against the mill owners and landlords supported by the British government in an effort to end oppressive taxation and other policies that forced the farmers and workers into poverty and defend their economic rights. A major part of this rebellion was a commitment from the farmers to end caste discrimination and oppressive social practices against women while launching a co-operative effort to promote education, health care and self-sufficiency by producing their own clothes and food.

Gandhi and his followers also founded numerous ashrams in India (Gandhi had pioneered the ashram settlement in South Africa). The concept of an ashram has been compared with the commune, where its inhabitants would seek to produce their own food, clothing and means of living, while promoting a lifestyle of self-sufficiency, personal and spiritual development and working for wider social development. The ashrams included small farms and houses constructed by the inhabitants themselves. All inhabitants were expected to help in any task necessary, promoting the values of equality. Gandhi also espoused the notion of "trusteeship," which centred on denying material pursuits and coveting of wealth, with practitioners acting as "trustees" of other individuals and the community in their management of economic resources and property.

Contrary to many Indian socialists and communists, Gandhi was averse to all notions of class warfare and concepts of class-based revolution, which he saw as causes of social violence and disharmony. Gandhi's concept of egalitarianism was centred on the preservation of human dignity rather than material development. Some of Gandhi's closest supporters and admirers included industrialists such as Ghanshyamdas Birla, Ambalal Sarabhai, Jamnalal Bajaj and J. R. D. Tata, who adopted several of Gandhi's progressive ideas in managing labour relations while also personally participating in Gandhi's ashrams and socio-political work.

== Swaraj, self-rule ==
Rudolph argues that after a false start in trying to emulate the English in an attempt to overcome his timidity, Gandhi discovered the inner courage he was seeking by helping his countrymen in South Africa. The new courage consisted of observing the traditional Bengali way of "self-suffering" and, in finding his own courage, he was enabled also to point out the way of 'Satyagraha' and 'ahimsa' to the whole of India. Gandhi's writings expressed four meanings of freedom: as India's national independence; as individual political freedom; as group freedom from poverty; and as the capacity for personal self-rule.

Gandhi was a self-described philosophical anarchist, and his vision of India meant an India without an underlying government. He once said that "the ideally nonviolent state would be an ordered anarchy." While political systems are largely hierarchical, with each layer of authority from the individual to the central government have increasing levels of authority over the layer below, Gandhi believed that society should be the exact opposite, where nothing is done without the consent of anyone, down to the individual. His idea was that true self-rule in a country means that every person rules his or herself and that there is no state which enforces laws upon the people.

This would be achieved over time with nonviolent conflict mediation, as power is divested from layers of hierarchical authorities, ultimately to the individual, which would come to embody the ethic of nonviolence. Rather than a system where rights are enforced by a higher authority, people are self-governed by mutual responsibilities. On returning from South Africa, when Gandhi received a letter asking for his participation in writing a world charter for human rights, he responded saying, "in my experience, it is far more important to have a charter for human duties."

An independent India did not mean merely transferring the established British administrative structure into Indian hands. He warned, "you would make India English. And when it becomes English, it will be called not Hindustan but Englishtan. This is not the Swaraj I want." Tewari argues that Gandhi saw democracy as more than a system of government; it meant promoting both individuality and the self-discipline of the community. Democracy was a moral system that distributed power and assisted the development of every social class, especially the lowest. It meant settling disputes in a nonviolent manner; it required freedom of thought and expression. For Gandhi, democracy was a way of life.

== Gandhian economics and ethics ==
Gandhian economics do not draw a distinction between economics and ethics. Economics that hurts the moral well-being of an individual or a nation is immoral, and therefore sinful. The value of an industry should be gauged less by the dividends it pays to shareholders than by its effect on the bodies, souls, and spirits of the people employed in it. In essence, supreme consideration is to be given to man rather than to money.

The first basic principle of Gandhi’s economic thought is a special emphasis on ‘plain living’ which helps in cutting down your wants and being self-reliant. Accordingly, increasing consumer appetite is likened to animal appetite which goes the end of earth in search of their satisfaction. Thus a distinction is to be made between 'Standard of Living' and 'Standard of Life', where the former merely states the material and physical standard of food, cloth and housing. A higher standard of life, on the other hand could be attained only if, along with material advancement, there was a serious attempt to imbibe cultural and spiritual values and qualities.

The second principle of Gandhian economic thought is small scale and locally oriented production, using local resources and meeting local needs, so that employment opportunities are made available everywhere, promoting the ideal of Sarvodaya – the welfare of all, in contrast with the welfare of a few. This goes with a technology which is labour-using rather than labour-saving. Gandhian economy increases employment opportunities; it should not be labour displacing. Gandhi had no absolute opposition to machinery; he welcomed it where it avoids drudgery and reduces tedium. He used to cite the example of Singer sewing machine as an instance of desirable technology. He also emphasised dignity of labour, and criticised the society’s contemptuous attitude to manual labour. He insisted on everybody doing some ‘bread labour’.

The third principle of Gandhian economic thought, known as trusteeship principle, is that while an individual or group of individuals is free not only to make a decent living through an economic enterprise but also to accumulate, their surplus wealth above what is necessary to meet basic needs and investment, should be held as a trust for the welfare of all, particularly of the poorest and most deprived. The three principles mentioned above, when followed, are expected to minimise economic and social inequality, and achieve Sarvodaya.

== Environmentalism ==
Several of Gandhi's followers developed a theory of environmentalism. J. C. Kumarappa was the first, writing a number of relevant books in the 1930s and 1940s. He and Mira Behan argued against large-scale dam-and-irrigation projects, saying that small projects were more efficacious, that organic manure was better and less dangerous than man-made chemicals, and that forests should be managed with the goal of water conservation rather than revenue maximization. The Raj and the Nehru governments paid them little attention. Guha calls Kumarappa, "The Green Gandhian," portraying him as the founder of modern environmentalism in India.

== Notable Gandhian Economists ==
- J K Mehta
- J. C. Kumarappa

== See also ==
- Gandhian socialism (Hindu nationalism)
