= Nangamangalam =

- village
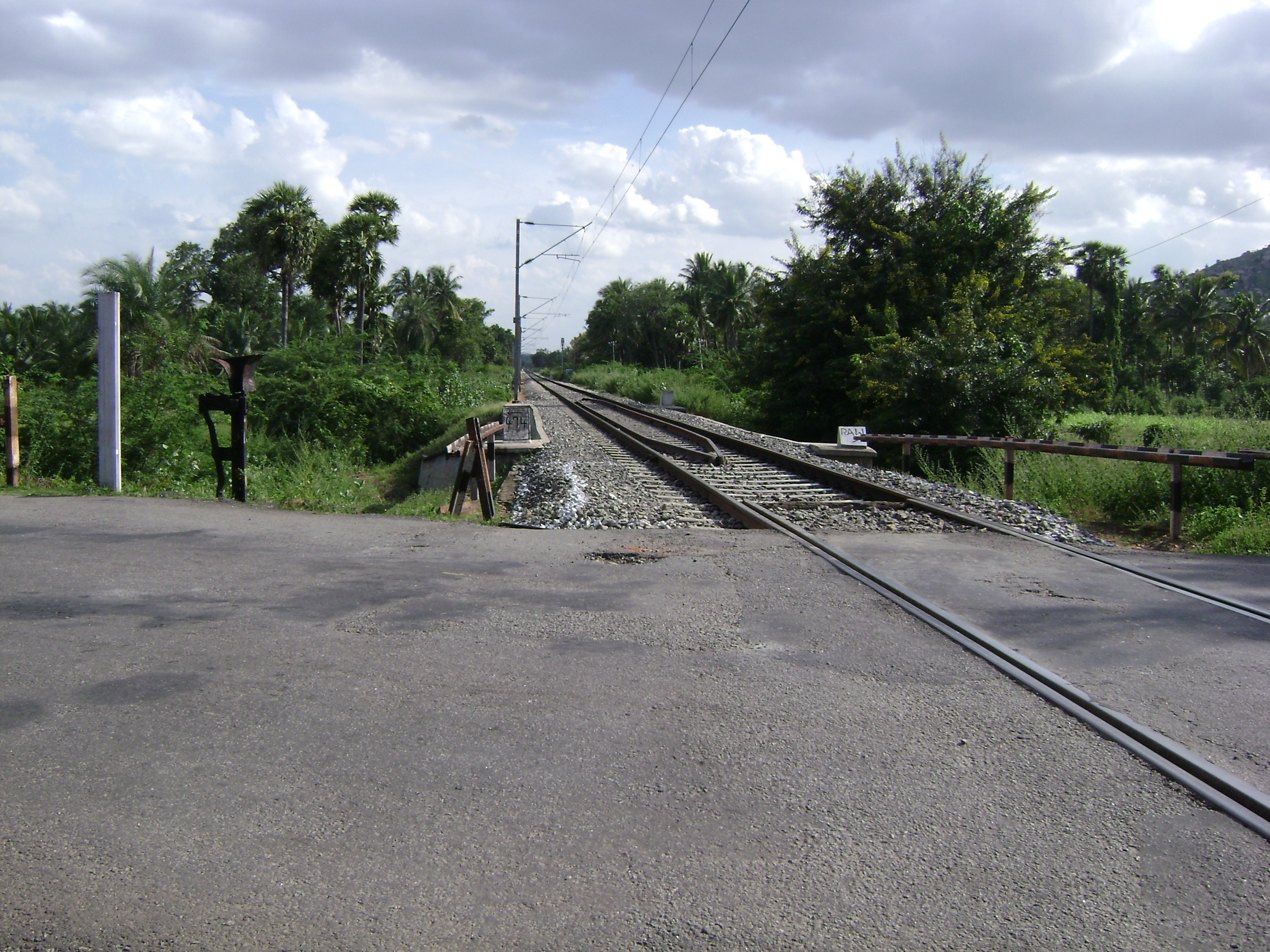
- Intersection of NH4 and the railway line
- Interactive map of Nangamangalam
- Location in Andhra Pradesh, India Nangamangalam (India)
- Coordinates: 13°02′40″N 79°10′39″E
- Country: India
- State: Andhra Pradesh
- District: Chittoor
- Elevation: 300 m (980 ft)

Population (2001)
  - Total: 2,661

Languages
  - Official: Telugu
- Time zone: UTC+5:30 (IST)
- PIN: 517132
- Telephone code: 08572
- Vehicle registration: AP

Nangamangalam is a village in the Chittoor district of Andhra Pradesh in India.

== History ==
The village supposedly came up around 500 years back when a few people belonging to Reddy community from Guntur and Nellore came and settled here, which was then an area under the rule of Bommi Naidu, who ruled Vellore.

== Administration ==
The village comes under the Gudipala Mandal of Chittoor District and falls under the Chittoor assembly constituency and Chittoor parliamentary constituency.

== Demographics ==
Telugu is official language of this village.

The table below shows the demographic details of Nangamangalam.

Description	Count
Households	737
Total Population	2,661
Male population	1,275
Female Population	1,386
Population under 6 years	315
Boys Under 6 Years	158
Girls Under 6 Years	157
Total Literates	1,710
Total Illiterates	951
