= Philip Furley Fyson =

British botanist and educator (1877–1947)

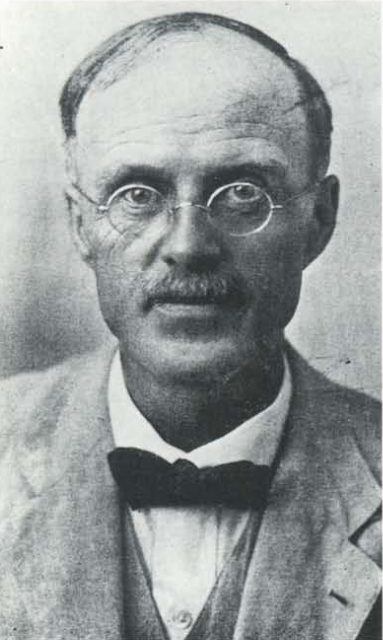
P.F. Fyson

Philip Furley Fyson (1877–1947) was a botanist and educator who worked in India. He is noted as the author of the first illustrated volumes on the flora of the South Indian hills. The Fyson prize is instituted in his honour by the Presidency College, Chennai for work in the area of Natural science.

== Early life ==
Fyson was born in Japan to British missionary parents and his early education was in Scotland. He earned a first class in the Natural Science tripos at Cambridge and in 1904 he moved to Madras in South India to join the Presidency College of Madras.

== Botany in India ==
From 1920 to 1925 he served as Inspector of Schools for Visakhapatnam and Ganjam districts. He later returned to the Presidency college in and became its Principal from 1925 to 1932.

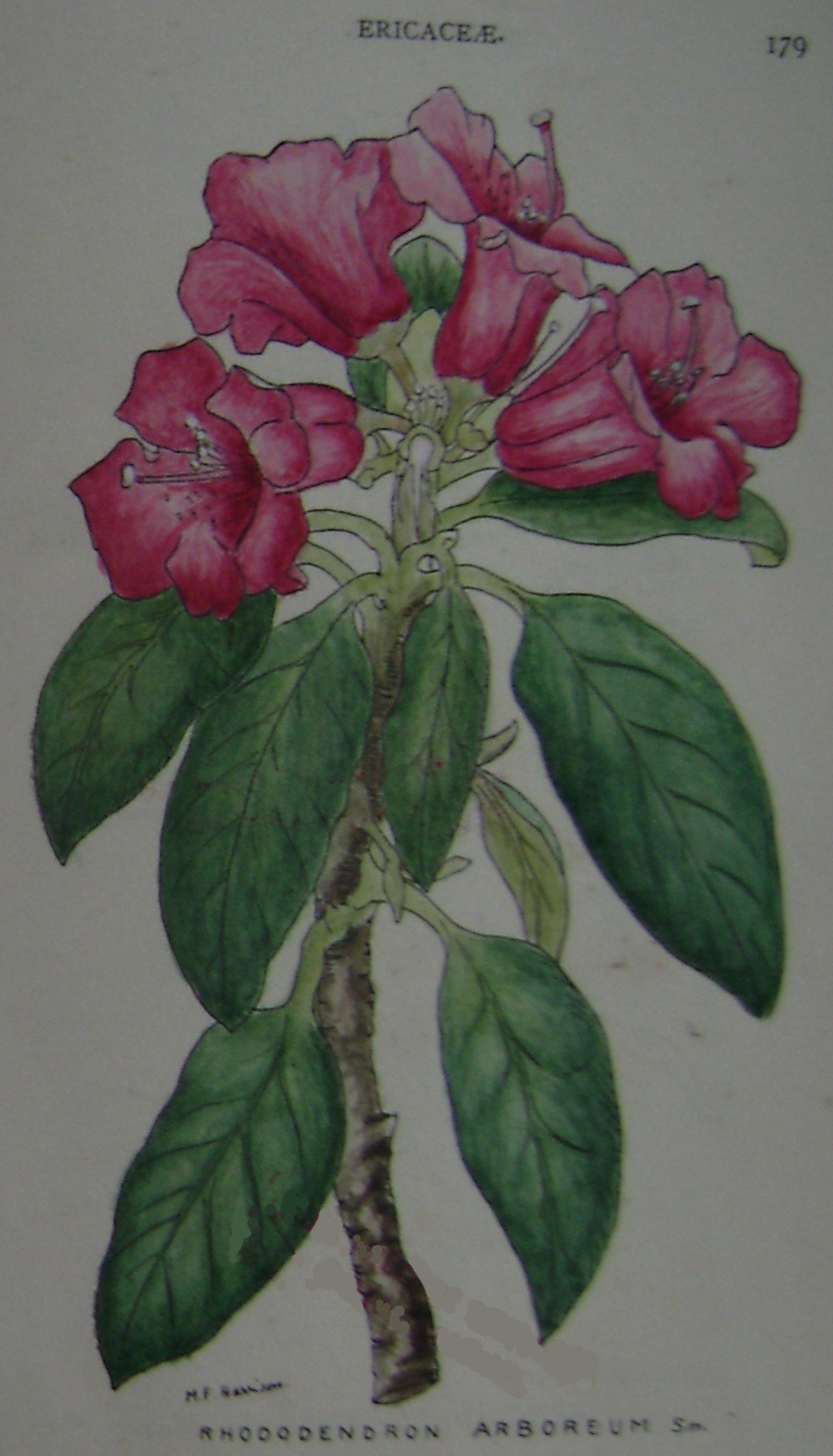
Rhododendron arboreum from Fyson

He wrote a textbook of botany in 1912 for college students. He also wrote a book on Madras flowers with 100 illustrated plates, a Flora of the South Indian Hills and a monograph on the genus Eriocaulon. He helped establish and launch the Journal of Indian Botany through the Indian Botanical Society (started in 1919). The journal was later to become Journal of the Indian Botanical Society.

From 1906, he took great interest in the botany of the hills and spent time in the Sacred Heart College at Shembaganur, near Kodaikanal, working along with Fr. E. Gombert, on the local botany. In 1910 some 30 amateur women naturalists in the Kodaikanal and Ooty area were illustrating the local flora under the guidance of Lady Bourne. Sir Alfred Gibbs Bourne and Lady Bourne were interested in the botany of these hills and approached him for adding information on these plants. This led him to study the local flora and the Kew collections.

He took leave for this study and in 1915 this resulted in The Flora of the Nilgiri and Pulney Hill-tops with 286 illustrated pages and 483 species. A supplement followed in 1921 with species from the lower elevations and notes on the Shevaroy Hills. This was followed in 1932 by The Flora of the South Indian Hill Stations' covering 877 species. His wife Diana Ruth Fyson also illustrated the book, with nearly 320 of the 611 plates contributed by her. She was interested in art and nature and also wrote a guide to the Mahabalipuram area.

Professor Fyson retired and returned to England in 1932 and settled at Rushwick, Worcester. He died in a road accident on 24 December 1947. His wife Diana died on 16 December 1969 at Hexham, Northumberland.

Although modern botanists have not been impressed by the works, his was the first major illustrated flora. This work created a lot of interest in the flora and stimulated many new botanical works. He also encouraged many naturalists including Madhaviah Krishnan. Fyson was elected member of the Linnean Society on 21 April 1904.

The standard author abbreviation Fyson is used to indicate this person as the author when citing a botanical name.

== Gallery ==
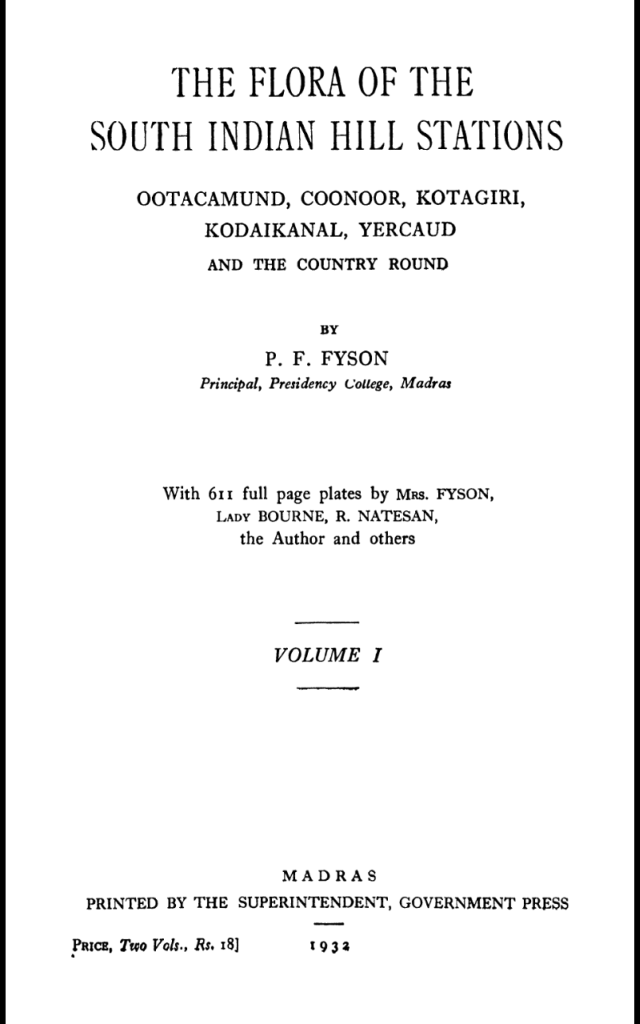
The Flora of the South Indian Hill Stations, Ootacamund, Coonoor, Kotagiri, Kodaikanal, Yercaud and the Country Round, Vol. I, 1932

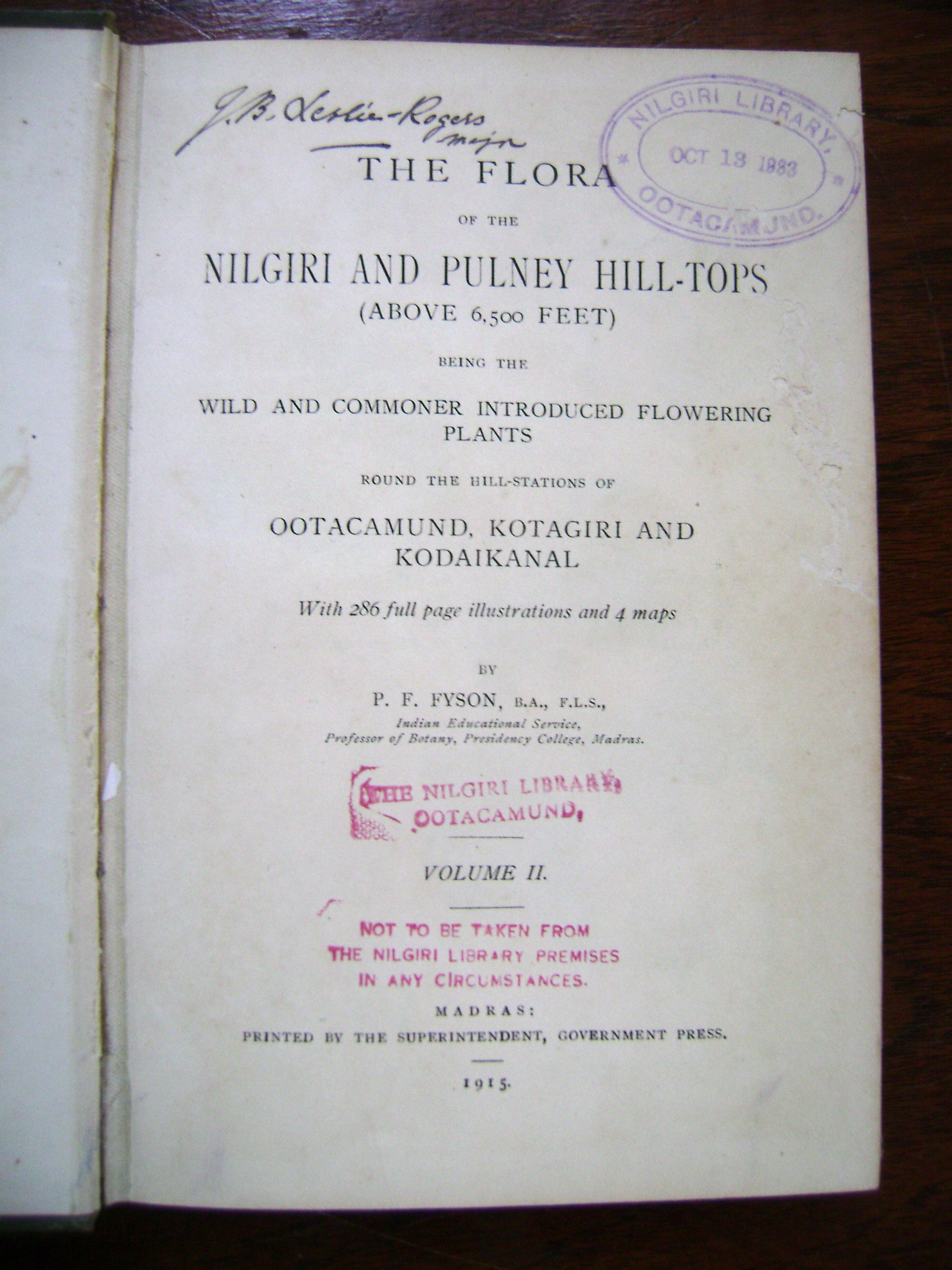
The Flora of the Niligiri and Pulney Hill-Tops (Above 6,500 Feet), Vol. II, 1915

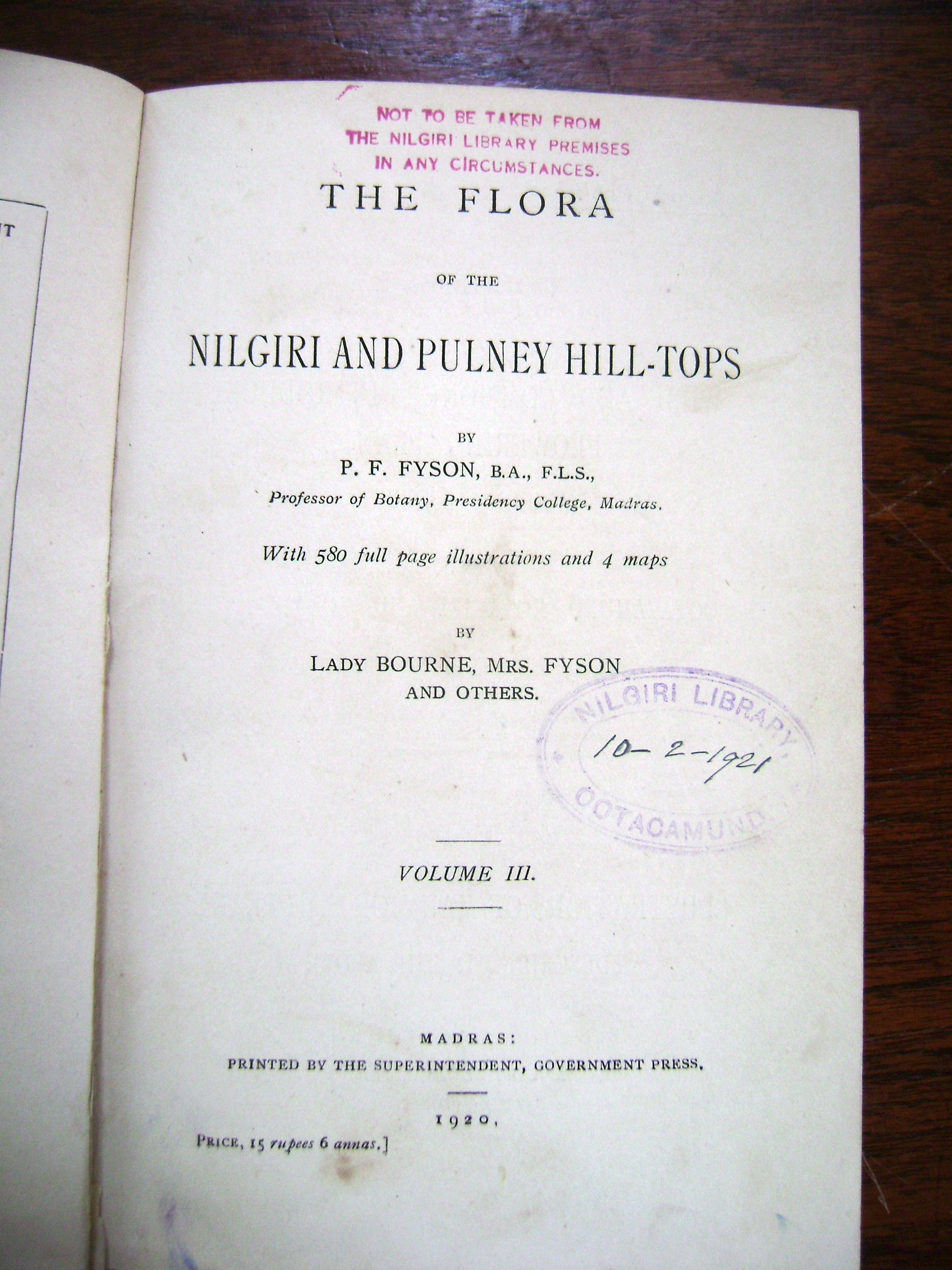
The flora of the Niligiri and Pulney Hill-Tops, Vol. III, 1920.

== External sources ==
- The Flora of the South Indian Hill Stations: Ootacamund, Coonoor, Kotagiri, Kodaikanal, Yercaud and the Country Round, 2008 (In 3 Volumes), P.F. Fyson ISBN 81-87067-47-0 Hardcover, xxix+258p., iv+259-485p., iv+486-697p., Figures; Appendices; Index; 24 cm., Dec 2008, Asiatic Publishing House.
- Article with portrait
- Madras Flowers
