= Ashtasahasram =

Regions with significant populations
- Tamil Nadu

Languages
- Brahmin Tamil

Religion
- Hinduism

Related ethnic groups
- Iyer, Tamil people

Ashtasahasram is a sub-sect of the Iyer community of Tamil Brahmins from the Indian state of Tamil Nadu.

== Culture ==
The Ashtasahasrams as Iyers belonging to the Smarta tradition, along with the Vadamas, Brahacharanams, Vadyamans/Madhyamans, and the Kanials/Kaniyalars. However, the Ashtasahasrams are smaller in number.

The Ashtasahasrams follow the Taittirīya śākhā of the Kr̥ṣṇa Yajurveda.

They are Aparaśikhā Brahmins, who wear their traditional hair tuft towards the back of their head.

== Divisions ==
The Ashtasahasram community is further sub-divided into four groups:

- Āttiyūr
- Arivarpede
- Nandivādi
- Satkulam
