= Kanyakumari Brahmin =

Southern Indian Vedic and Tantric Brahmin inter-dependent communities

Kanyakumari Brahmins
Regions with significant populations
- Thiruvananthapuram, Nagercoil, Suchindram, Kanyakumari

Languages
- Historical: Sanskrit, Pali; Modern: Local languages, primarily: Tamil, Malayalam

Religion
- Hinduism (100%)

Related ethnic groups
- Iyers, Iyengar, Namboothiri and different Brahmin Communities.

Kanyakumari Brahmins are a social group of Vedic as well as Tantric Brahmin inter-dependent communities mainly found in southern India, and are basically known to represent a geographic-identity based Shaiva-Vaishnava-Shakta spiritual and political union. This unionist system of worship is supported by a monastic melting pot of Vadama people of the Thiruvananthapuram district of Kerala and Kanyakumari district of Tamil Nadu, along with descendants of Nambudiris, Iyengars, Iyers, Madhwas, and other Indo-Aryan people who migrated to the region in different waves to support pilgrimage in the region. The word Kanyakumari Brahmins means the Brahmins whose common ancestors, before any schisms, had settled around the greater Kanyakumari region which includes south Kerala and Tamil Nadu and Brahmins here, irrespective of all superficial differences, respect it as a common identity and do religious rituals in the Suchindram temple together.

This region also known as Ay Kingdom was spread to the borders of Central Travancore in ancient times. Vadamas are believed to be the migrants from the north of Vindhya reaching the other coast of Tambapanni in the south crossing Pamba after Agastya and Pulastya. All sub-groups of Kanyakumari Brahmins were believed to be the ancestors of local Iyengars as well as the local Namboothiris and others in ancient Suchindram, who also share a common ancestry irrespective of their faith.

All these Hindu sub-groups have ancestors who co-existed peacefully with Buddhists and Jains and share Pali, Sanskrit, Malayali, Tamil, southern Pandyan and even ancient Yogic traditions and heritage with their neighbours. The ancient ports in this region connected the people to Sri Lanka and Maldives as international trade brought migrants from many parts of India and other kingdoms in this geographic triangle which had a common economic and melting pot cultural history until the British rule began.

It is to be noted that though the patrilineal predecessors of Kanyakumari Brahmins, and Tamil Brahmins in general, were of Indo-Aryan origin, they mixed with the local native Dravidian peoples over the span of hundreds of years, so much so that the genetic makeup of these Brahmins is now majorly Dravidian with Indo-Aryan underlay.
