= Kerala Iyer =

Brahmin subcaste

Kerala Iyers
Regions with significant populations
- Palakkad district, Kerala; Travancore Region (Thiruvananthapuram district, Alappuzha district), Kerala; Thrissur district, Kerala; Ernakulam district, Kerala; Calicut district, Kerala

Languages
- Tamil, Malayalam, Sanskrit

Religion
- Hinduism

Related ethnic groups
- Iyers, Namboothiris, Tamil Brahmin

Kerala Iyers, Pattars or Bhattars are Tamil Brahmins of the Indian state of Kerala; people who were residents in the Kerala region. The word "Pattar" originated from the Sanskrit word "Bhat", which is a common surname of Northern Brahmin Clans. The community consists of two groups: the Palakkad Iyers and the Iyers of the Cochin and Travancore regions.

Kerala Iyers, like the Iyers of Tamil Nadu and the Nambudiris of Kerala, belonged to the Pancha-Dravida classification of India's Brahmin community. They mostly belonged to the Vadama and Brahacharanam sub-sects.

However, Iyers (like other Tamil Brahmins) are not recruited as the priest (shanthi) in Kerala temples which followed Tantric rituals. So Iyers, being Vedic scholars, built their own temples in their Agraharams to conduct puja, since they followed different rituals and not the Tantric rituals of the Nambudiris.

== Brahmana Samooham ==
Where ever they settled, the Kerala Iyers lived together in communities. The settlement consisting of array of houses and other amenities developed by Tamil Brahmins in Kerala came to be known as Agraharam as in other parts of South India. Each Agraharam consist of two rows of houses facing each other. There is no courtyard but only common street. Several such Agraharams together form an organization called "Samooham".

== Palakkad Iyers ==
The Palakkad Iyers are the Iyers, who settled in today's Palakkad region centuries before, during the rule of the Palakkad Kings. Their mother tongue is Tamil and they speak Malayalam outside their homes. The Palakkad Iyers were greatly affected by the Kerala Agrarian Relations Bill, (repealed in 1961 and substituted by The Kerala Land Reforms Act, 1963) which abolished the tenancy system.

== Travancore Iyers ==
During the rule of Travancore kings, many Iyers (Tamil Brahmins) migrated to Thiruvananthapuram. Tamil Iyers migrated mostly from Tirunelveli to Thiruvananthapuram. The ancestors of the Thiruvananthapuram Iyers were brought from “Brahmadesam" (a village in Ambasamudram Taluk of Modern day Tirunelveli District in Tamil Nadu) by the Travancore Kings, to take part in the “Mura Japam” ritual of Sri Padmanabhaswamy temple. The Mura Japam ritual is a ritual where Brahmins with Sanskrit Veda knowledge participate. The migration continued for decades, and thus Iyer population is concentrated around this temple in Thiruvananthapuram.They were given agraharams around the temple and the fort, as well as in Karamana Agraharam and Chalai Agraharam.

== Notable people ==
- Ulloor S Parameswara Iyer
- Vidya Balan
- Chembai Vaidyanatha Bhagavatar
- V. Dakshinamoorthy
- Ranjani-Gayatri
- Hariharan
- Apsara Iyer
- Divya S. Iyer
- Palghat Mani Iyer
- Shreyas Iyer
- Jayaram
- Ajith Kumar
- Shankar Mahadevan
- Priyamani
- Vivek Ramaswamy
- Malayattoor Ramakrishnan
- R. S. Krishnan
- TN Seshan
- M. S. Thripunithura
- Trisha Krishnan
- V. R. Krishna Iyer
- Nithya Raman

== Organization ==
The Kerala Brahmana Sabha is the apex organization of Kerala Iyers.
