= P. S. Sivaswami Iyer =

Indian lawyer (1864–1946)

Sir Pazhamaneri Sundaram Sivaswami Iyer KCSI CIE
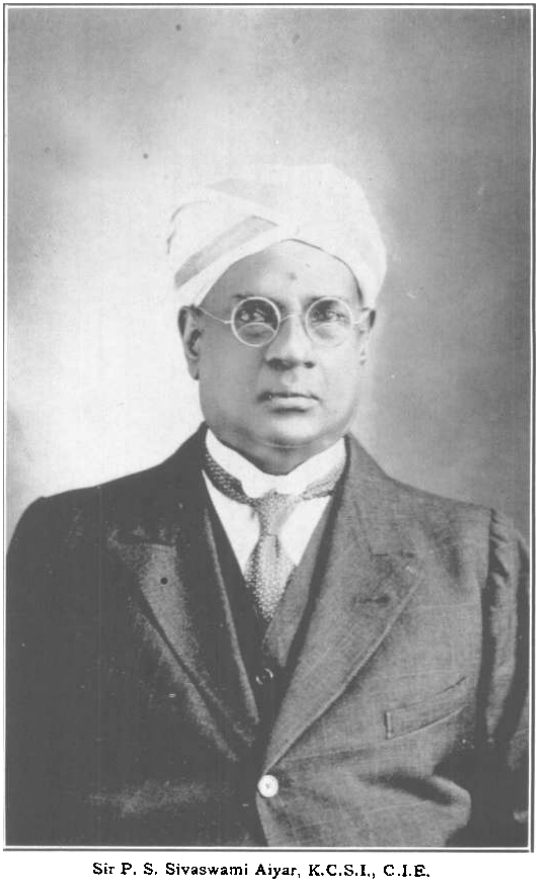
- Portrait of Sir P. S. Sivaswami Iyer

Member of the Council of State (India)
- In office 1922–1923
- Governor-General: Rufus Isaacs, 1st Marquess of Reading

2nd Vice-Chancellor of Banaras Hindu University
- In office 1918–1919
- Preceded by: Rai Bahadur Sir Sunder Lal
- Succeeded by: Pandit Madan Mohan Malaviya

Member of the Executive Council of the Governor of Madras Presidency
- In office 1911–1917
- Governor: Sir Murray Hammick (acting), John Sinclair, 1st Baron Pentland

Advocate-General of Madras
- In office 1907–1912
- Succeeded by: S. Srinivasa Iyengar

Personal details
- Born: 7 February 1864 Tanjore, Madras Presidency, India
- Died: 5 November 1946 (aged 82) Mylapore, Madras
- Occupation: lawyer, administrator

Sir Pazhamaneri Sundaram Sivaswami Iyer KCSI CIE (7 February 1864 – 5 November 1946) was a prominent lawyer, administrator and statesman who served as the Advocate General of Madras from 1907 to 1911.

Sivaswami Iyer was born on 7 February 1864 in the village of Palamaneri. He had his schooling in Palamaneri and graduated from Presidency College, Madras. Sivaswami Iyer studied law and practised as a lawyer serving as the Advocate-general of Madras Presidency from 1907 to 1911. He also served as a member of the executive council of the Governor of Madras and as a member of the Council of State. He was an influential member of the Mylapore clique. Sivawami Iyer died on 5 November 1946 at the age of 82.

Sivaswami Iyer was also active in the Indian independence movement and presented India's case before the League of Nations. He was a keen connoisseur of arts and library science.

== Early life ==
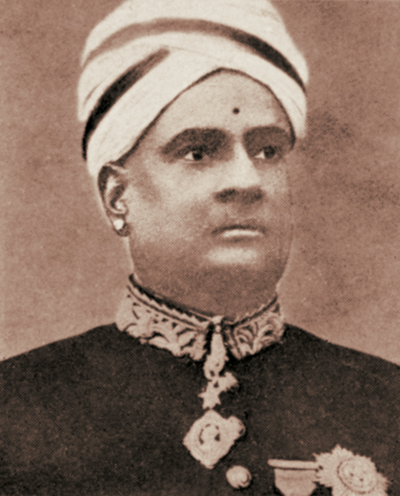

Sivaswami Iyer was born to Sundaram Iyer and Subbalakshmi in the village of Palamaneri on 7 February 1864. He belonged to the Palamaneri Brahacharanam who traced their descent from Krishnan Raman Brahmarayar, the commander-in-chief of the Chola army under Rajendra Chola.

Sivaswami had his schooling at the S. P. G. Branch School and the Manambuchavadi High School from where he matriculated with a first class in 1877. Sivaswami did his F. A. at the Government Arts College, Kumbakonam and graduated from Presidency College, Madras in January 1882, with a first class in Sanskrit and History. He studied law from Madras Law College and set up practice as a lawyer in 1885.

== Law, Government Service, and Education ==
After successfully practicing law for nearly twenty years, Sivaswami Iyer entered politics. being appointed to the Governor's of Madras' Legislative Council as an additional member in charge of making rules and regulations in 1904. After this he was appointed Advocate-General of Madras Presidency.

Sivaswami Iyer was elected to the senate of the Madras University in 1898 and served as Vice-Chancellor of the Madras University from 1916 to 1918. From 13 April 1918 to 8 May 1919, he served as the Vice Chancellor of Banaras Hindu University.

== Politics ==
Sivaswami Iyer entered politics in 1912 when he was appointed member of the Executive Council of the Governor of Madras as per the Minto Morley scheme and served from 1912 to 1917. During the First World War, he was instrumental in raising support for the Indian Volunteer Movement in order to provide support to the United Kingdom. His moderate views and weak opposition to Government policies including the widely condemned internment of Annie Besant during his tenure as member of the executive council earned him the displeasure of Indian nationalists. However, in 1919, Sivaswami Iyer expressed strong condemnation of the Jallianwala Bagh massacre.

Sivaswami Iyer was the Indian delegate to the third session of the League of Nations in 1922 in which, he condemned the mandate policy of General Smuts of the Republic of South Africa. Sivaswami Iyer served as a member of the Council of State from 1922 to 1923. He also opposed the Simon Commission on its arrival in India.

Sivaswami Iyer served as a member of the Imperial Legislative Assembly, in which he spoke often on military matters.

== Later life and death ==
In 1931, he was appointed member of the new Indian Military College Committee. During his later years, he expressed strong disapproval of any attempt to partition the subcontinent.

Sivaswami Iyer died in his Madras home on 5 November 1946 at the age of 82. On his death, the Lady Sivaswami Iyer girls school was named after him in his memory.

== Legacy and criticism ==
Sivaswami Iyer was an avid reader and a connoisseur of arts. He was a strong advocate of women's education and supported sweeping reforms to this regard. He took a special interest in military matters and served as a member of the Indian Military College Committee set up to establish an indigenous military academy on the model of Sandhurst.

Sivaswami Iyer was known for his mastery over Sanskrit and his love for the language. He is also known for his vehement attacks on Tamil extremists whom he once mocked as the "rabble in the towns".

== Family ==
Sivaswami Iyer's father Pazhamaneri Sundaram Iyer was a matriculate of the S. P. G. Mission High School in Tanjore. He served as a school teacher in the Mission School at Pattukkottai before enrolling as a pleader in the Tanjore Bar. Sundaram's wife Subbalakshmi hailed from the neighbouring village of Marur. Sivaswami had two younger brothers - Chandrasekaran, Sitharaman and Subrahmanyan and two sisters - Dharmambal and Sundari.

== Honours ==
Sivaswami Iyer was made a Companion of the Order of the Indian Empire in the 1908 New Year Honours and a Companion of the Order of the Star of India in 1912. He was promoted to a Knight Commander of the Order of the Star of India in 1915.

== Works ==
- P. S. Sivaswami Iyer (1919). Martial law administration in the Panjab. As described by the official witnesses.
- S. R. Ranganathan; P. S. Sivaswami Iyer; W. C. Berwick Sayers (1931). Five laws of library science.
- P. S. Sivaswami Iyer (1930). The Simon Commission Report Examined. Huxley Press.
- Mohan Singh Mehta; P. S. Sivaswami Iyer (1930). Lord Hastings and the Indian States: being a study of the relations of the British government in India with the Indian States 1813-1823.
- P. S. Sivaswami Iyer (1935). Evolution of Hindu Moral Ideals. Calcutta University.

== Biographies ==
- K. Chandrasekharan (1969). P. S. Sivaswami Aiyer, Builders of modern India. Publications Division, Ministry of Information and Broadcasting, Govt. of India.
- K. A. Nilakanta Sastri (1965). A great liberal: speeches and writings of Sir P. S. Sivaswami Aiyar. Allied Publishers.
- S. R. Bakshi (1996). P. S. Sivaswami Aiyar: Volume 67 of Indian freedom fighters : struggle for independence. Anmol Publications. ISBN 978-81-7488-260-8.
- Some Madras Leaders. Bishamber Nath Bhargava. 1922. pp. 52–56.
