= Madisar =

Style of draping Sari

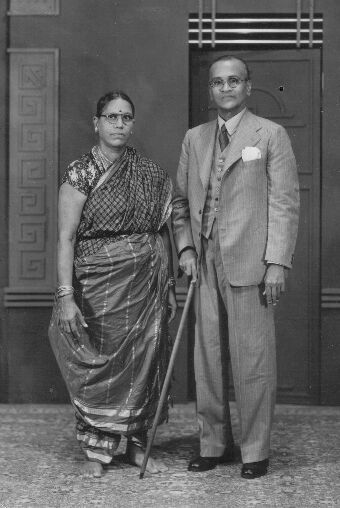
A Tamil couple c. 1945; the wife is wearing a madisar sari.

The Madisar (Tamil: மடிசார்) or Koshavam is a typical way in which the sari is worn among Tamil Brahmin and Vishvakarma (Asari) women, predominantly associated to the former. This style of sari tie retain characteristic elements from both the veshti or dhoti (menswear) and the "koshavam" or "kosu", the prominent drape among Tamil women. While sari and its tying styles dates back to ancient India, at least as far back as the period between 2nd century BC to 1st century AD, the Madisar and most modern styles of sari draping are much recent and generally undatable.

Tamil Brahmin women are required to use this style after their marriage. Different communities have evolved different sari styles from the original koshavam style, that requires more material - nine yards. Extant nine-yard sari styles include the nauvari of Maharashtra, the Kannada drape, the Telugu Brahmin style. The name Madisari is however typically associated with Tamil Brahmins, with two sub-styles: the Iyer kattu (tie) and the Iyengar kattu (tie). Today, madisar is hardly worn as daily wear, although women do drape the madisar style on select festive occasions and religious ceremonies. The madisar requires a nine-yard sari to wear it, unlike the current modern version of sari wearing style which needs 6 yards. Both Iyer and Iyengar Brahmins are supposed to wear madisars at ceremonial/ religious occasions, such as the wedding ceremony, the Seemantham (a religious ceremony conducted for a first pregnancy), all religious ceremonies, Puja, and death ceremonies.

Iyers and Iyengars wear Madisars differently. Iyers drape the Pallu (the layer of sari which comes over one's shoulder) over the right shoulder while Iyengars wear it over the left shoulder. Conventionally, the first Madisar a woman wears is maroon or red in colour, nowadays Madisar is being worn in other colours according to people's wishes.

Madisars are available in a variety of materials such as silk, cotton, cotton-silk blends, polyester-cotton blends, etc. These days a version of the madisar is also tied using the 6-yard sari. Though not as traditional, it is easier and more convenient to wear.
