= Durgai Amman Temple, Patteeswaram =

Amman temple in Thanjavur district, Tamil Nadu, India

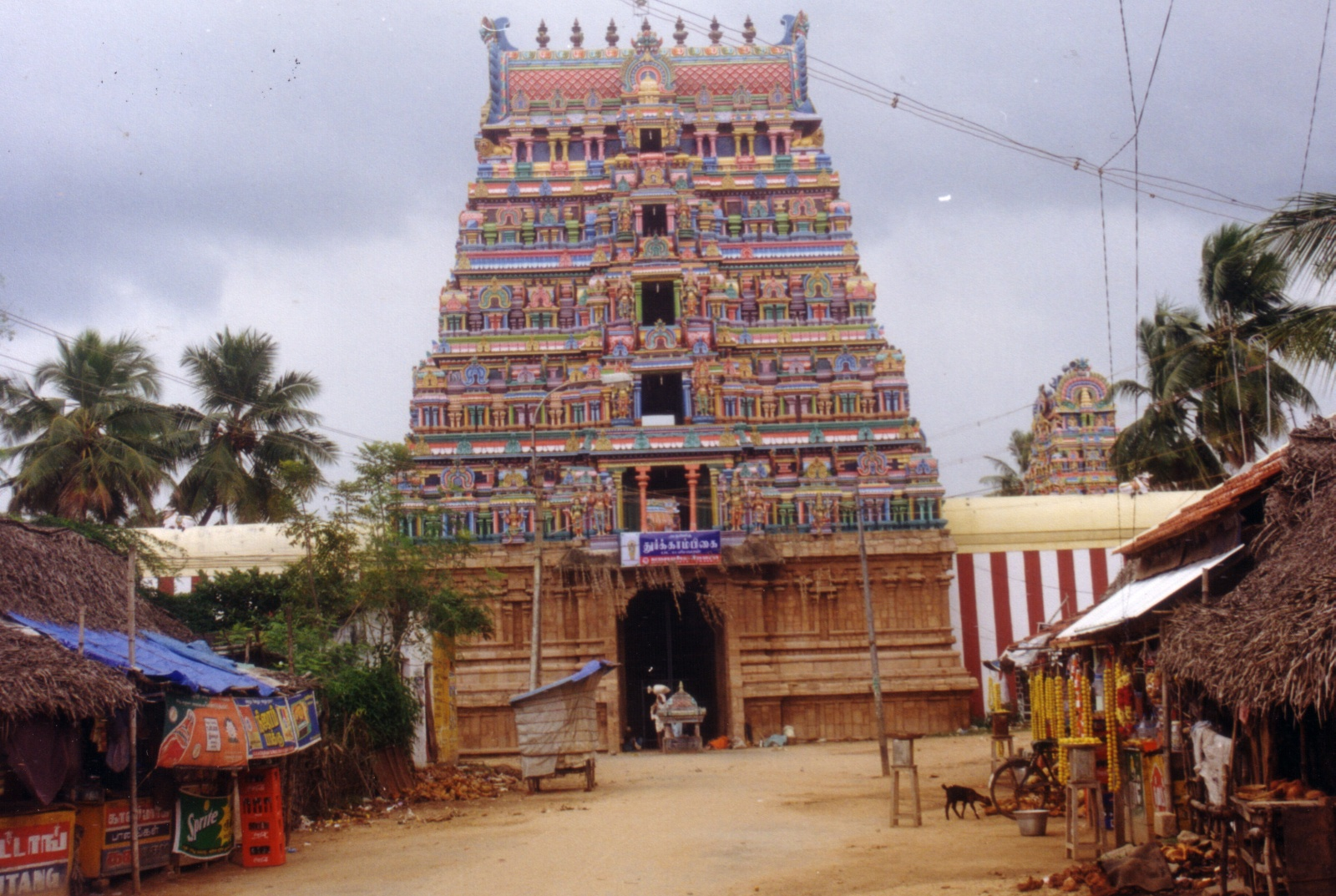
- Durgai Amman Temple, Patteeswaram, Thanjavur district, Tamil Nadu

- Durgai Amman Temple, Patteeswaram, Thanjavur district, Tamil Nadu

Religion
- Affiliation: Hinduism
- District: Thanjavur
- Deity: Durga
- Festival: Muthupandhal

Location
- Location: Patteeswaram
- State: Tamil Nadu
- Country: India
- Coordinates: 10.9250°N 79.3454°E

Architecture
- Type: Dravidian architecture
- Completed

Specifications
- Temple: One
- Elevation: 54.02 m (177 ft)

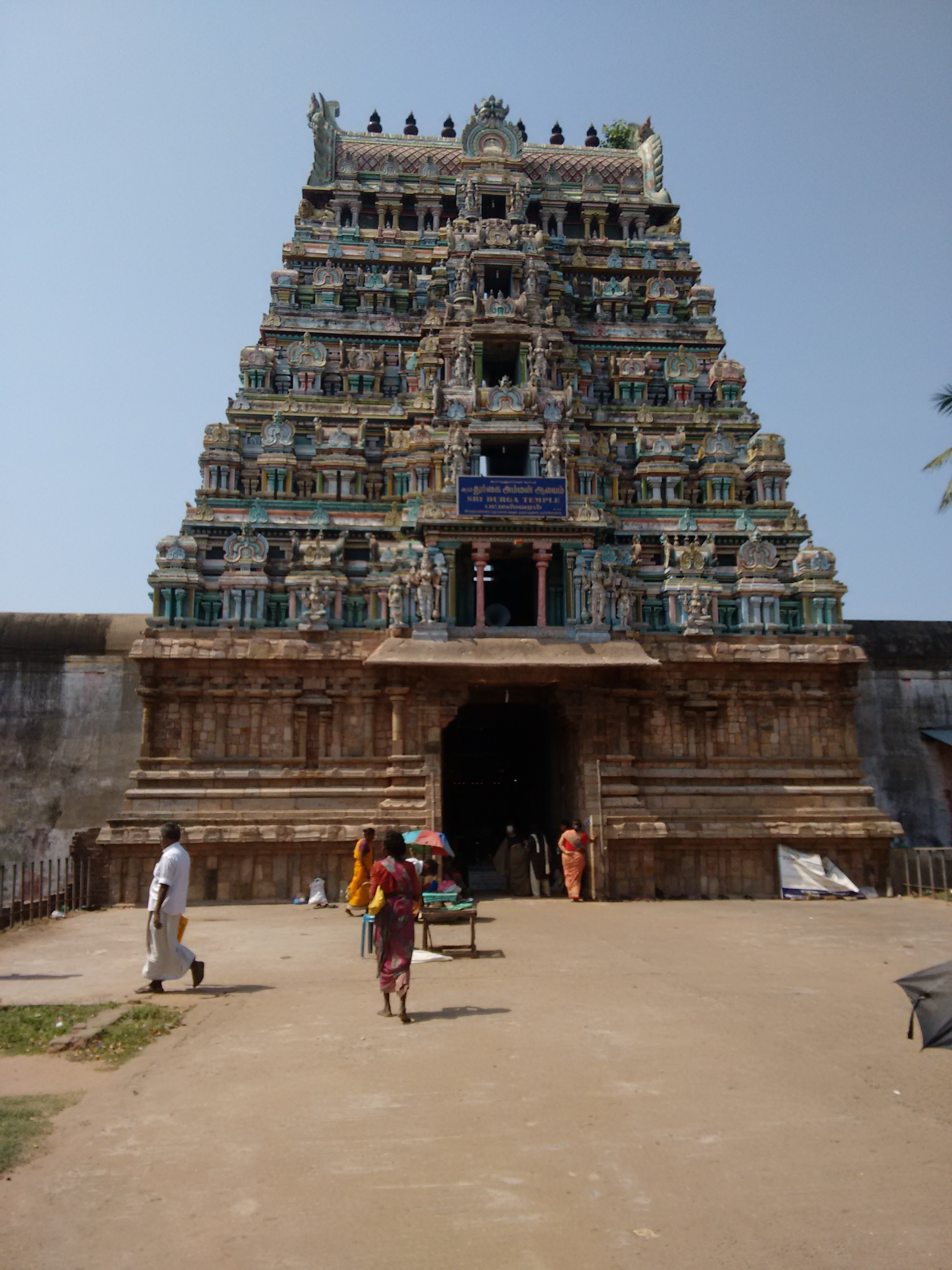
North Gopuram, entrance to Durgai Amman Temple

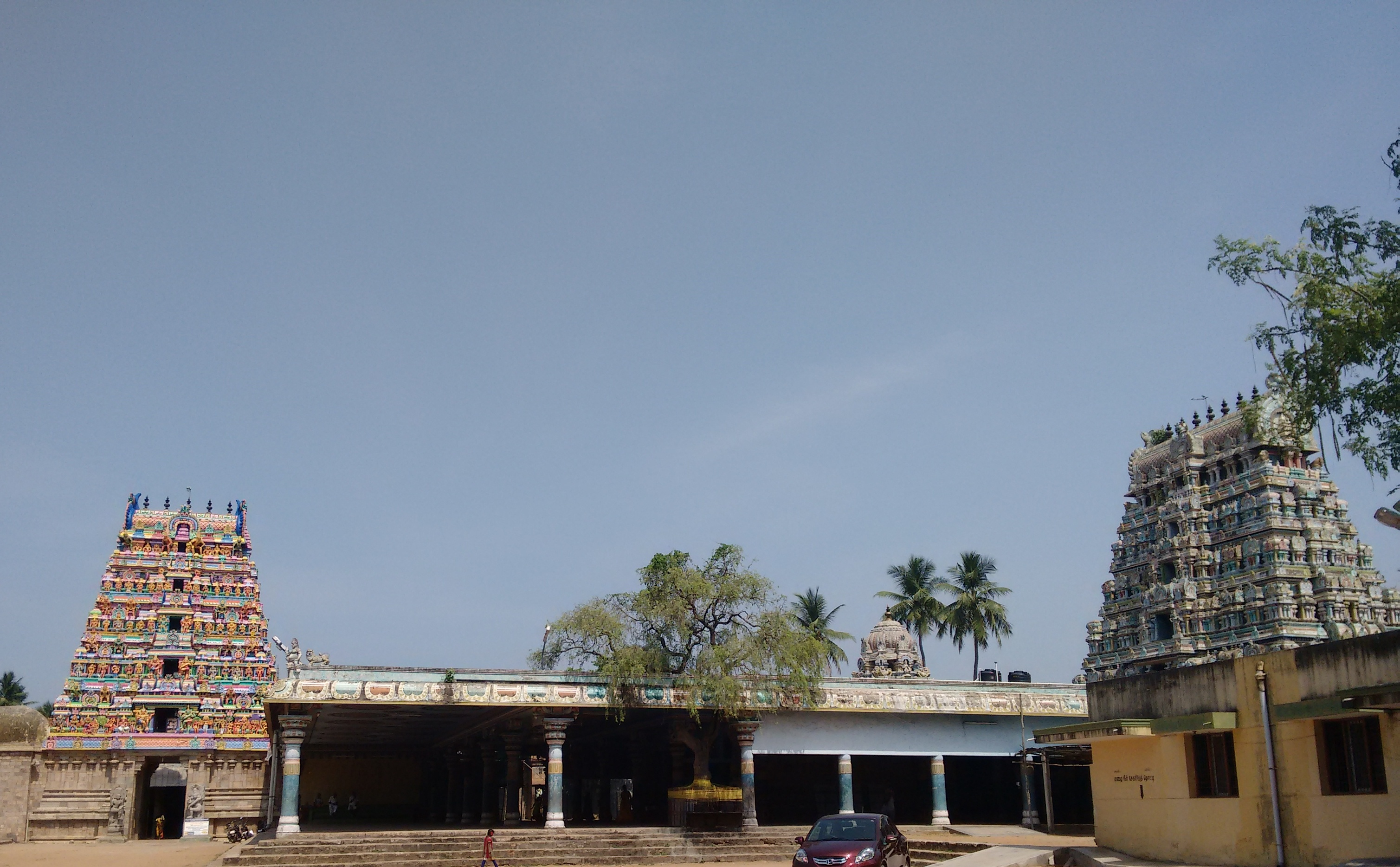
Durgai Amman Temple (left) in Thenupuriswarar Temple

Durgai Amman Temple is a Hindu temple dedicated to the goddess Durga located in Thenupuriswarar Temple, Patteeswaram near Kumbakonam, Tamil Nadu, India.

== Location ==
Daughter of Kamadhenu, Patti worshipped the Lord Shiva (Eeswaran) here, so this place got that name Patteeswaram. Though the main god is Siva this temple is known as Durgai Amman Temple. This temple is located at Thenupuriswarar Temple, as a separate shrine. By passing through the Gopuram of the north entrance of Thenupurisvara Temple, Durgai Amman Temple could be reached.

== History ==
Meenakshi was the Ista devata to Pandya dynasty while Durga to Chola dynasty. Mangayarkkarasiyar and Kundavai Pirāttiyār was very fond of her and worshipped her. Goddess Durga was the family deity of Rajaraja I and other Chola kings and they used to worship her and pray fervently to her before fighting a war. She was kept north of Patteeswaram during the Chola reign and was their 'Kaaval Deivam', the protecting deities. The kings used to go by her divine decree regarding battle and other state affairs, and respected her arul vaakku, blessings. After the fall of the Cholas, she was consecrated in Thenupurisvara Temple in Patteeswaram.

== Speciality ==
Durga is considered to be the combined force of all Gods to destroy the evil forces. She is considered as Shanta Swarupi (calm or peaceful countenance). She has eight hands on which she is holding conch, discus, bow, arrow, sword, shield, and a parrot. She is in tribanga posture. The poses of her eight hands express the following.

Sl No	Posture	Meaning
1	Abhayamudra	Assuring safety to devotee
2	Shankha	Show the way
3	Sudarshana Chakra (discus)	Destroy the enemy
4	Arrow	Goal the right direction
5	Shield	The shield will protect
6	Parrot	The hand holding parrot will tell what would happen

== Posture ==
She is in standing posture. She is found draped in traditional Madisar saree, with lemon and arali garland. She is of six feet height. The standing lion is facing right. She is found with smiling face, as if welcoming the devotees.

== Festivals ==
The temple is full to overcrowding during Rahukalam on Tuesdays, Fridays and Sundays, especially on Aadi Ashadha month. Muthupandhal is the biggest festival of this temple.

== Golden chariot ==
Arrangements are made for making golden chariot in this temple at a cost of 2.00 crores.

== Kumbhabhishekham ==
The Kumbhabhishekham of this temple and Thenupuriswarar Temple was held on 29 January 2016.

== Temple on Kumbhabhishekham day ==
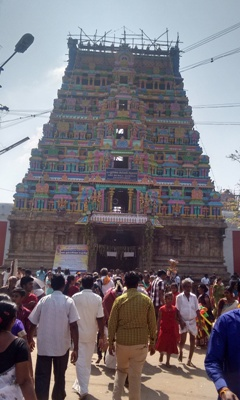

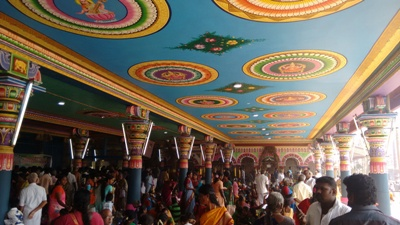

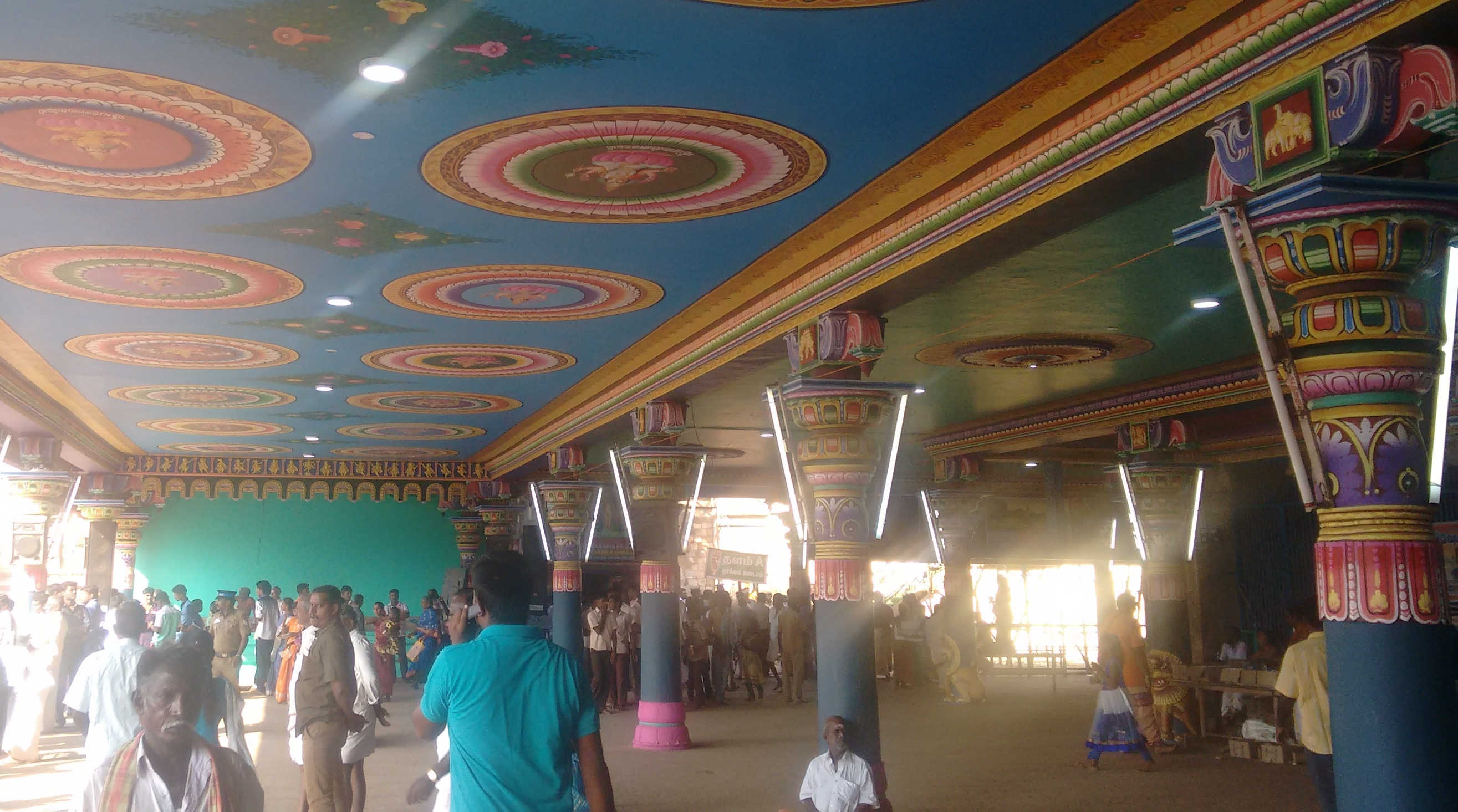

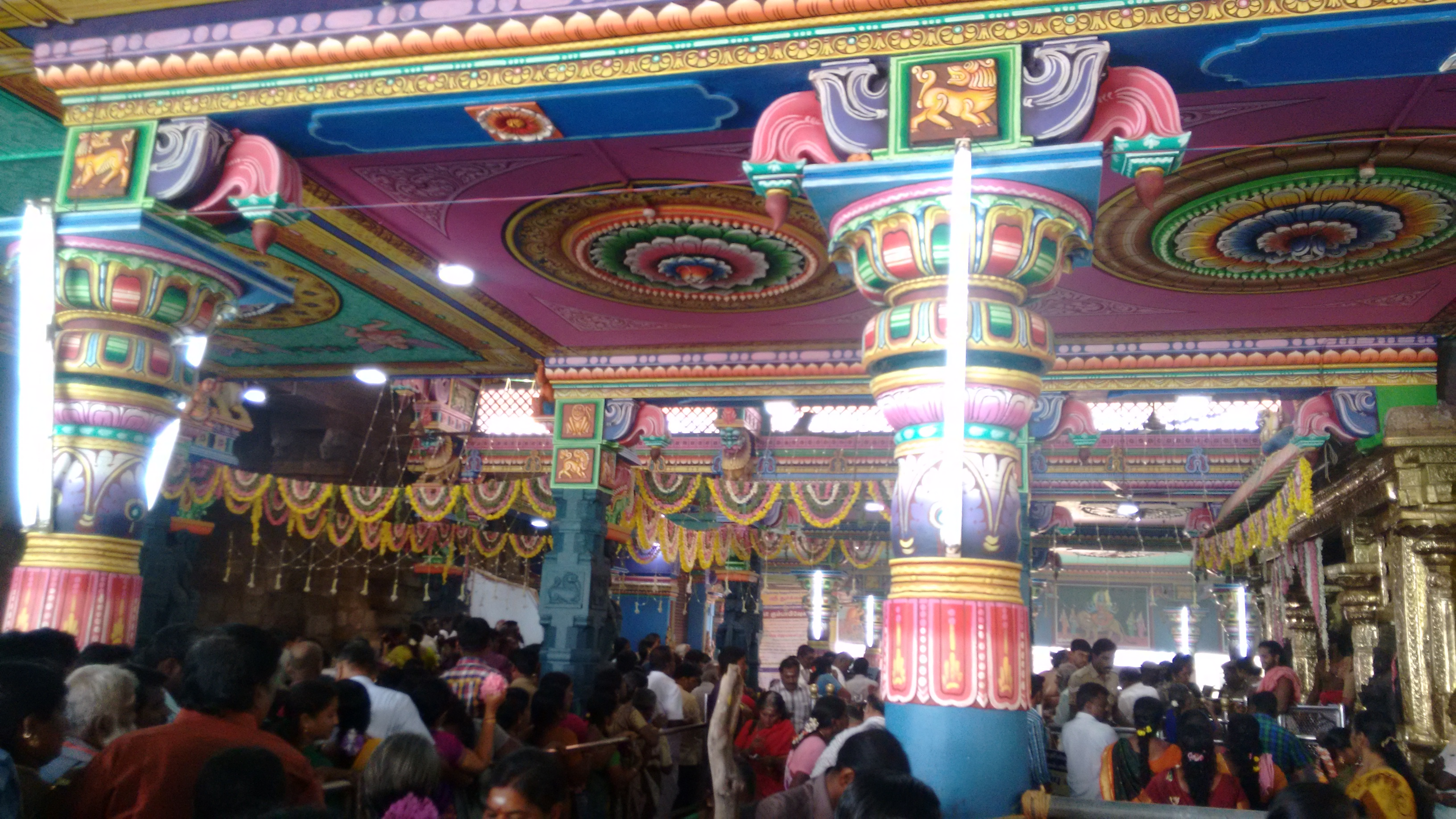

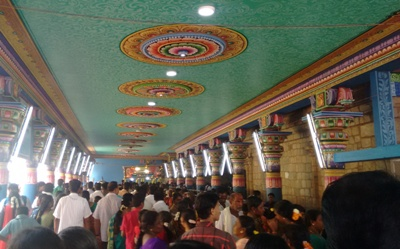

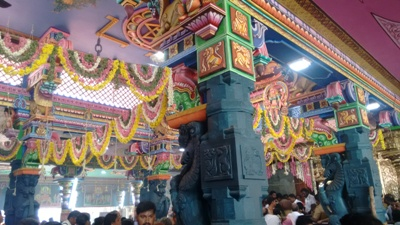

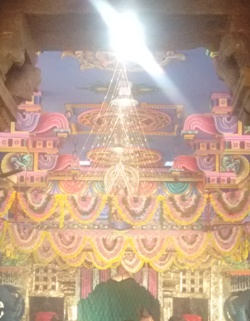
