= Palamaneri =

Palamaneri Pazhamarneri
- village
- Country: India
- State: Tamil Nadu
- District: Thanjavur

Languages
  - Official: Tamil
- Time zone: UTC+5:30 (IST)
- Telephone code: +91-4362
- Nearest city: Trichy
- Vidhan Sabha constituency: Thiruvaiyaru

Palamaneri (Pazhamarneri) is a small village situated on the South bank of the River Kaveri. It is located 30 km northwest of Thanjavur and 32 km northeast of Trichy. It is 2.5 km from Thirukattupalli.

== History ==
Even though it is a small village, the name of this village along with surrounding villages is mentioned in historical books since the Chola Period.

Subsequent generations settled in adjoining villages along as well as across the Kaveri. These villages include Nemam, Kuthur, Pachambettai (near Lalgudi) and Onbathhuveli (near Thirukattupalli ).

The Flood during 1961 ruined the eastern part of this village and it was renovated again.

== Notable residents ==
Sir P. S. Sivaswami Iyer, a great Philanthropist who established a high School in Tirukkattupalli and a Girls High School in Mylapore, Chennai belongs to this village. P.S.Sundaram, educationist and recipient of award from the Government of Tamil Nadu for his translation of Tirukkural, Bharati's Poems etc. into English also hails from this village. High Court Judge Justice Mr P.N, Ramasami Iyer and Tamil writer Sri. Balakumaran hails from this village.

Shri Krishnan Raman Brahmarayar, Defense Minister of Rajaraja Chola was from this village. Even though he is Saivite by birth, he followed Vaishnavism through his lifetime. His son Arun Mozhi Bhattan served the ministry of Rajendra Chola I during the Chola Period. The descendants of their family were then called as Pazhamarneri Brahmarayas and commonly constitute the Palamaneri Brahatcharanam of the Iyer community. They live in huge houses with areas more than 5,000 sq ft (500 m^{2}) in size. Their basic occupation is the supervision of agricultural lands. Until the 1970s most of them possessed a good area of land. However, due to change in the political scenario in Tamil Nadu they fled to major cities, but some continued residing here thriving on agriculture based business. Pazhamarneri (Palamaneri) is a small village situated on the South bank of the River Kaveri. It is located 30 km northwest of Thanjavur and 32 km northeast of Trichy. It is 2.5 km from Thirukattupalli. Even though it is a small village, the name of this village along with surrounding villages is mentioned in historical books since the Chola Period.Kulothunga CholaI created this village in memory of his wife Dhina Chinthamani and gave it to Brahmins as Brahma Desam Dhina means Surya the deity of Cholas. It once called as Dhina Chinthamani Chatur Vedi Mangalam. During the period of Mutharaiyas it was in the control of the king Perumbidugu Suvaran Maran and at that time called as Palamarnery.As one Maraneri is adjacent to this village it is called as Palamarnery in the meaning as "Old One"

Several musicians hailed from this village. Direct disciples of Thyagarja the saint Composer of Thiruvaiyaru hailed from Palamarneri. Violinist Subramania Iyer, Sangeetha Kalanidhi Swaminatha Iyer also hailed from this place. N. Kesi, a Flautist of repute, who was the youngest musician of her days to cut a gramophone record (when gramophones were hand wound for playing). Her disciple, flautist G.Sridhar, who is also the great grandson Sangeetha Kalanidhi Swaminatha Iyer, also hails from this village. Popular Carnatic and South Indian playback singer Mahathi also hails from this village.

== Religion ==
The Grama Deivam (Village Deity who is believed to protect the residents of the village) is "Alankariamman". There is a temple with regular rituals even today for Alankariamman. As well there is a famous Siva temple in this village that attracts many visitors during festival days such as Arudhra Dharsanam, Sivarathri. There is also a VenugopalaSwami temple in the same village. There is also a Bala Hanuman Temple on the banks of the River Cauvery. This road on the banks of the River Cauvery leading from the place Thirukattupplli to Kallanai dam, has been referred to in the famous historical novel "Ponniyin Selvan" written by amarar Kalki
