= Kerala Brahmana Sabha =

- കേരള ബ്രാഹ്മണ സഭ
- Abbreviation: KBS
- Established: 1970; 56 years ago
- Type: Caste based organization
- Headquarters: Thiruvananthapuram
- Location: Kerala, India
- Key people: H. Ramanathan (president)

Kerala Brahmana Sabha (KBS) is a registered charitable organization which works for the progress of Kerala Iyers, one of the sects of Tamil Brahmins settled in Kerala.

The KBS is one of the influential community organizations in Kerala politics. It is yet to contest elections directly but functions as a pressure group and works towards greater political representation of Kerala Iyers in governance.

== Organisation structure and membership ==
The Kerala Brahmana Sabha is organized geographically in three tiers (State, District and local levels).

=== Upasabha ===
The grass – root level unit of KBS is known as "Upasabha". All Tamil Brahmins living in the geographic locality of an Upasabha are eligible to become its members. The highest decision-making body of the Upasabha is its General Body which consists of all the members of that Upasabha. The activities of Upasabha is managed by an Upasabha Executive Committee (EC) elected by the respective Upasabha General Body.

The Upasabha Executive Committee consist of a President, a vice president, a Secretary, a Joint Secretary, a Treasurer and minimum 5 members. The term of office-bearers and EC Members is two-years.

=== KBS District Committee ===
The next level on the organization structure of KBS is the District General Body and District Executive Committees. At present there are 14 district GB and EC in KBS across Kerala. The General Body of the district consist of (i) President and Secretary of all Upasabhas in that District (ii) Elected district representatives of Upasabhas, (iii) Life Members of KBS in that district and (iv) Patrons of KBS in that district.

The District Executive Committee is elected by the respective District General Body. The executive committee of district consist of a President, two Vice Presidents, a Secretary, two Organising Secretaries, two Joint Secretaries, a Treasurer and maximum 15 members. The term of office-bearers and Members is two-years.

=== KBS Zone ===
The districts are grouped under three zones for more co-ordination of activities. They are South Zone, Central Zone and North Zone.

Zone	Districts
South	Thiruvananthapuram, Kollam, Pathanamthitta, Alappuzha
Central	Kottayam, Idukki, Ernakulam, Thrissur
North	Palakkad, Malappuram, Kozhikode, Wayanad, Kannur, Kasaragod

=== KBS State Committee ===
The apex decision-making body of the organization is KBS State General Body. The State General Body consist of (i) President and Secretary of all districts committees (ii) Elected state representatives of all Upasabhas (iii) Life Members of KBS and (iv) Patrons of KBS. KBS State General Body will elect a KBS State Executive Committee.

The KBS State Executive Committee consist of (i) a State President (ii) 15 members out of which the President shall nominate (a) a General Secretary, (b) two Joint Secretaries, and (c) a Treasurer, (iii) 3 Vice Presidents elected one each by the Zonal Committees (iv) 3 Joint Secretaries elected one each by the three Zonal Committees, (v) President and Secretary of all districts committees, and (vi) Immediate Past President and General Secretary will be Ex-Officio members. The term of office-bearers and EC Members is two-years.

KBS also has a women's wing and a youth wing.

=== KBS Vanitha Vibhagom ===
The Kerala Brahmana Sabha Vanitha Vibhagom (KBSVV) was formally established in 1990 through a two-page guideline adopted by the Kerala Brahmana Sabha. It started functioning from the same year. During 2006-07 its activities were further streamlined. KBSVV is actively involved in organising the Tamil Brahmin women in Kerala through its various events and programmes. The Vanitha Vibhagom takes active interest in providing skill building programmes for the Tamil Brahmin women so that they can become self-reliant. It also works closely with KBS and Yuvajana Vibhagom in all programmes and events.

The organization structure of KBS Vanitha Vibhagom is similar to the KBS with General Body and Executive Committees at Upasabha, District and State level. The term of office-bearers and EC Members is two-years.

=== KBS Yuvajana Vibhagom ===
The Kerala Brahmana Sabha Yuvajana Vibagam (Yuva) was formally established in 2010. It acts as a platform of the Tamil Brahmin youth in Kerala to come together and work for the development of the community. Its objective is to provide all facilities to the Tamil Brahmin youth to improve their skills and faculties to become model citizens. Its conducts different programmes aimed at skill development and educational improvement of the community especially the Tamil Brahmin youth. It also acts as a grooming place for the youth to sharpen their leadership skills and organisational abilities.

The organization structure of KBS Yuvajana Vibagom is similar to the KBS with General Body and Executive Committees at Upasabha, District and State level. The term of office-bearers and EC Members is two-years.

== Affiliation ==
The KBS is affiliated to the All Kerala Brahmin Federation, which is affiliated to the All India Brahmin Federation.

== Activities ==
KBS is actively involved in organizing the annual Kalpathi Ratholsavam in Palakkad. It also organizes trade fairs and food festivals to popularise the Kerala Iyer cuisine among the general public. It organizes seminars on social issues, and sports and games events for its members.

The KBS runs institutions for the poor among the community. Its Sankara Santhi Nilayam at Kalady provides accommodation, food, and medical care, for aged and destitute Kerala Iyers. The Sabha also provides housing and financial help for the maintenance and renovation of agrahara, especially the dilapidated dwelling places of the poor.

In 2014, the KBS courted controversy when it opposed faith conversions and re-conversions, and announced that it would not welcome reconverts to its fold.

In 2015, during protests over reservation in India, KBS demanded minority status and reservation for economically backward Kerala Iyers.

In 2016, the KBS favoured continuance of the dress code for women entering the Sree Padmanabhaswamy Temple in Thiruvananthapuram. It opposed allowing women wearing salwar kameez or churidar, and without draping dhoti, to enter the temple.

In 2017, the KBS favoured the continuance of the custom prohibiting women between 10 and 50 years of age from entering the Sabarimala Temple. The KBS also demanded that the Government of India should seriously consider providing reservation based on economic status of its citizens and the political parties cannot avoid the long-standing demands of Brahmin community that composes of 6% of the population.
