= Brahacharanam =

Sub-sect of the Iyer community of Tamil Brahmins of India

Total population
- Unknown

Regions with significant populations
- Indian states of Tamil Nadu, Karnataka, and Kerala

Languages
- Tamil; Malayalam; Kannada; Sanskrit (liturgical)

Religion
- Hinduism

Related ethnic groups
- Iyer, Tamil people

Brahacharanam is a sub-sect of the Iyer community of Tamil Brahmins. The word "Brahacharanam" is a corruption of the Sanskrit word Brhatcharanam (Sanskrit: बृहत्चरणम्). Many Brahacharanam follow the Advaita Vedanta philosophy propounded by Adi Shankara. Some Brahacharanam adhere to Shivadvaita. The Brahacharanams, along with the Vadamas, form the major portion of the Kerala Iyer community.

== Sub-groups ==
The Brahacharanam are divided into the following subgroups:

- Kandiramanickam (a village in Tiruvarur district, near Kodavasal, in Nachiyar kovil to Nannilam road)
- Milaganur (a village in Sivagangai district)
- Mangudi (a village in Tanjore district near Kumbakonam)
- Pazhamaneri (a village in Tanjore district)
- Kolathur (a village in Kanchipuram district)
- Marudancheri
- Mazhanadu
- Sathyamangalam (Erode district)
- Puduru Dravida (In Andhra Pradesh)

A significant number of Brahacharanams have migrated to Kerala, where they are part of the Kerala Iyer community. They have also migrated in large numbers to Puduru (meaning new town/village /place) in between Nellore and Chennai, Andhra Pradesh where they form the Puduru Dravida community.

== Etymology ==
The word bruhat in Sanskrit means "great", "vast" or "significant" and the word charanam refers to feet. The name Brahacharanam can be thus literally translated as "feet of the greats" referring to the status of a Guru, and the Brahacharanam being those who follow in the footsteps of the Greats.

Another interpretation for Brahacharanam provided by K.A. Nilakanta Sastri in his 'History of South India' is the 'Great Migration'. Sastri notes that this could be taken as evidence of one of the earliest migrations of people from Karnataka into Tamil Nadu, especially given that many Brahacharanam sub-sects have names such as Satyamangalam, Mangudi etc. - all names of villages hugging the Western Ghats, and thereby denoting the route taken from North to South. Sastri considers this interpretation to be too speculative, given there is no direct evidence for the same.

== Origins ==
Their exact origins are not clear but their presence in the Tamil Kingdoms extends back at least to the reign of Parantaka Chola II, who is said to have brahmarayars as ministers. Many of the agraharam villages of the Brahacharanam also have very ancient origins.

== Traditional role ==
The traditional function of Brahacharanams is to study and impart Vedic knowledge or officiate as priests in religious functions. However, there is evidence that in ancient times, they might have also served in the army or in civil and administrative services. During the Chola period, members of the community (especially the Pazhamaneri Brahacharanam) even served as army commanders. Senapathi Krishnan Raman was the Commander-in-chief of the Imperial Chola army of Rajendra Chola I. Brahacharanam also consider themselves to be among the first followers of Adi Shankaracharya.

== Notable people ==
=== Chandrasekhar family (Mangudi sub-group) ===
- Sir C.V.Raman, Nobel Prize winner in Physics from India
- Subrahmanyan Chandrasekhar, Nobel Prize winner in Physics from India, nephew of C.V.Raman

=== Others ===
- Alladi Krishnaswamy Iyer, member of the Constituent Assembly of India and M.P. Rajya Sabha
- Maha Vaidyanatha Iyer, a Carnatic vocalist
- D. V. Gundappa, a writer, poet and philosopher
- V. Ramaswamy Aiyer, founder of Indian Mathematical Society (Sathyamangala Brahacharanam)
- V. Balakumaran (Tamil writer and novelist)
- Sir P. S. Sivaswamy Iyer, Advocate General of Madras during British times(Palamaneri Brahacharanam)
- Mangudi Dorairaja Iyer (Bharathanatyam teacher)
- Manakkal Nambigal (A vaishnavite saint, disciple of Uyyakondar)
- Manakkal Rangarajan (a renowned Carnatic musician)
- Alladi Ramakrishnan, son of Alladi Krishnaswamy Iyer founder of Matscience India (Pudur Dravida)
- Alladi Kuppusamy Iyer, prominent Jurist son of Alladi Krishnaswamy Iyer (Pudur Dravida)
- T. Paramasiva Iyer, district sessions judge of Bangalore (Mangudi Brahacharanam)
- T. Sadasiva Iyer, chief justice of Travancore, brother of T. Paramasiva Iyer (Mangudi Brahacharanam)
- Mahakavi C. Subramania Bharathi (Tamil poet)
- Kothamangalam Subbu (Tamil poet, lyricst, author)
- Subramaniya Siva (Tamil Writer and Pure Tamil Movement Activist)
- Natarajan Chandrasekaran (chairperson of Air India and Tata Sons)
- M. Gopala Krishna Iyer (Tamil writer and founder of Madurai Manavar Senthamil Sangam)
- B.Rajam Iyer (Carnatic Singer)
- Ramana Maharshi (famous spiritual saint)
- Karaikudi Sambasiva Iyer ( Renowned Veena Player)
- Karaikudi Mani ( Renowned Mridangist)
- Natesa Sastri ( Indian Polyglot)
- B.R Rajam Iyer( notable Indian Lawyer during colonial period)
- B.S Ramiah ( Tamil Journalist)
- C.S Chellappa ( Tamil Journalist)
- judge L S Parthasarathy iyer of lalgudi(Malanadu Brahacharanam)- sessions judge
- Dr S Kalyanaraman neurologist
- Mylrengam Natesa Iyer Banker( Tamilnadu Central Bank)
- Lalgudi G Jayaraman violinist
- Jeyarathan (S. Venkatasubramanian), Tamil Novelist / writer - (Khandaramanickam Brahacharanam)
- Trichy Sankaran ( Famous Mridangist)
- Edayathumangalam C Rangaswami Ayyar ( Founder of E.R Higher Secondary School, Tiruchirappalli)
- Dr Raj Iyer ( US Army's CIO)
- Rao Bahadur Lalgudi Doraiswamy Venkatarama Iyer Main creator of Mettur Dam
- Siva Ananth
- Pachampettai A Subrahmanya Ayyar ( founder of Egmore Sanskrit School)
- Thinniyam Venkatarama Iyer ( Carnatic Musician)
- V Suresh ( popular Ghatam player)
