= B. Shankar Rao =

Indian musical artist (1922–2020)

- Born: 10 May 1922
- Died: 13 September 2020 (aged 98)
- Genres: Classical, Indian classical music
- Occupation(s): Flautist, music teacher
- Instruments: Flute, vocals

B. Shankar Rao (10 May 1922 – 13 September 2020) was an Indian flautist who specialised in classical carnatic music.

== Biography ==
After obtaining his initial music training from his sister Smt. Balaamba he got the opportunity to learn flute from the flute mastero T. R. Mahalingam (popularly known as Flute Mali). His music was also influenced from his interactions with Veena Rajarayaru and Anooru Suryanarayana. Over the years he has enthralled audience both in India and abroad with his characteristic style of flute techniques reminiscent of Mali.

Shankar Rao worked as a Post Master for most of his life but his passion for Carnatic classical music made him come home often from his place of posting. Finally he settled in Bangalore. He performed many flute concerts, both in India and abroad, and received many accolades and awards throughout his music career. The prestigious Rajyothsava award was conferred on him in the year 2008.

He was instrumental in setting up and running the 'Prapancha', institution, which aimed to educate and influence young people about flute and classical carnatic music. Apart from teaching music and giving concerts he was also actively involved in research collaboration with Divakars speciality hospital in Bangalore, aimed at studying the influence of carnatic music on human health.

Shankar Rao died in Bangalore on 13 September 2020, at the age of 98.

== Awards ==
Shankar Rao was bestowed with the title of 'Venugana Visharada' by A. N. Krishna Rao, and was honoured with the honorific 'Sangeetha Kalarathna' by the Bangalore Gayana Samaja in 2002. In 2008, the Government of Karnataka awarded him the prestigious Rajyotsava Prashasti for his achievements and services in the field of carnatic music. He was also awarded the "Vayoshrestha Samman" in October 2017 by the President of India, Ram Nath Kovind.
