= N. Kesi =

- Origin: Palamaneri, Tamil Nadu, India
- Genres: Carnatic music
- Occupation: Carnatic instrumentalist
- Instrument: Venu flute

N. Kesi (March 1918 – 16 June 2015) was an Indian Carnatic flautist and was a student of T. R. Mahalingam.

== Early life ==
Born in the month of March 1918, in Madras (now Chennai) N. Kesi grew up in a family blessed with traditional values and discipline. Her father, P. S. Vaidyanatha Iyer was a lawyer and mother a housewife with five of her brothers and sisters. In the midst of her schooling, she started her classes for Carnatic music in Nagapattinam at the age of five. In no more than few years she became an adept vocalist. Consequent to the move of the family to Tanjore, Kesi took an interest to flute and learnt the basics under Pandit S. Subramania Shastri and further developed her skills under the guidance of Pandit S. Subramania Shastri of Tanjore.

She married P. A. Narayanaswamy of her native village Palamaneri in the year 1934.

== Career ==
With sheer hard work and diligence she started her professional career as a flutist in Madras under the guidance of Maestro T.R.Mahalingam alias ‘Mali’, a prodigy. Kesi is the only lady disciple and the only lady who had accompanied Mali in public performances. Subsequently she also received her music lessons from T. Brinda.

She was the first lady to give flute recital in Carnatic style at the All India Radio (AIR) after it came into being. She has given over a dozen recitals in the National Program of AIR. She has also performed in Chennai Doordarshan and Delhi Doordarshan. A number of recordings of her performances have been made both by AIR and Delhi Doordarshan. She was a A Grade artist in both AIR and Doordarshan.

Widely traveled, N. Kesi has performed in a number of countries including UK, France, Rome, Switzerland, Bulgaria, Yugoslavia, Germany, Sri Lanka, the Netherlands, Romania, and Italy. She has also played in the orchestra for Bharata Natyam recitals of Rukmani Devi Arundale and Kumari Kamala. She has also recorded a number of gramophone records and audio cassettes. Music labels His Master's Voice and Sangeeta published her music.

She also produced many flautists through her teaching of the art. Her flute students include Vasanthi Shekar, G Sridhar, Navin Iyer, Harinarayanan Ramachandran and Kaushik.

== Awards and recognition ==
N. Kesi was honoured by the Tamil Nadu State Government with the Kalaimamani award in 1972. Sri Sankaracharya of Kamakoti Peetam honoured her with the Sankaracharya Award in 1996.

She was awarded the Sangeeth Natak Akademi Award the highest Indian recognition to practicing artists in 1997 for Flute in the Carnatic music instrumental categorySangeet Natak Akademi Award

She was a visiting professor in Tamil Nadu Music College. And she has been a judge for many concerts and competitions in AIR.
