= 1908 New Year Honours =

Appointments by King Edward VII to various orders and honours

The New Year Honours 1908 were appointments by King Edward VII to various orders and honours to reward and highlight good works by members of the British Empire. They were announced on 31 December 1907.

== The Most Honourable Order of the Bath ==
=== Knight Commander (KCB) ===
Civil Division

- Sir John Edward Arthur Murray Scott, Bart.

== Order of the Star of India ==
=== Companion (CSI) ===
- Francis Alexander Slacke, Esq., Indian Civil Service, Member, Board of Revenue, Bengal, and an Additional Member of the Council of the Governor-General for making Laws and Regulations.
- John Nathaniel Atkinson, Esq., Indian Civil Service, Acting First Member, Board of Revenue, Madras, and an Additional Member of the Council of the Governor of Fort St. George for making Laws and Regulations.
- Saiyid Husain Bilgrami, Esq., lately Director of Public Instruction, Hyderabad, Member of the Council of the Secretary of State for India.
- Percy Comyn Lyon, Esq., Indian Civil Service, Chief Secretary to the Government of Eastern Bengal and Assam.
- Algernon Robert Sutherland, Esq., lately Chief Engineer and Secretary to the Government of the United Provinces, Public Works Department.

== Order of the Indian Empire ==
=== Knight Grand Commander (GCIE) ===
- His Excellency General the Right Honourable Horatio Herbert, Viscount Kitchener of Khartoum, G.C.B., O.M., G.C.M.G., Commander-in-Chief in India.
- Honorary Major His Highness Farzand-i-Dilpazir-i-Daulat-i-Inglishia Nawab Muhammad Hamid Ali Khan Bahadur of Rampur.

=== Knight Commander (KCIE) ===
- His Highness Raja Bane Singh of Rajgarh.
- Thomas Gordon Walker, Esq., C.S.I., Indian Civil Service, lately Financial Commissioner, Punjab.
- Arthur Naylor Wollaston, Esq., C.I.E., lately Registrar and Superintendent of Records, India Office.

=== Companion (CIE) ===
- Palamaneri Sundaram Sivaswami Aiyar, an Additional Member of the Council of the Governor of Fort St. George for making Laws and Regulations.
- Francis Guy Selby, Esq., Acting Director of Public Instruction, and an Additional Member of the Council of the Governor of Bombay for making Laws and Regulations.
- Colonel William Riddell Birdwood, Aide-de-Camp to The King, Military Secretary to His Excellency the Commander-in-Chief in India.
- Saint-Hill Eardley-Wilmot, Esq., Inspector-General of Forests to the Government of India.
- William Herbert Dobbie, Esq., lately Accountant-General, Madras.
- Alfred Hamilton Grant, Esq., Indian Civil Service, Secretary to the Chief Commissioner and Agent to the Governor-General, North-West Frontier Province.
- Sao Mawng, K.S.M., Sawbwa of the Shan State of Yawng Hwe.
- Khan Bahadur Sahibzada Hamid-uz-Zafar Khan, Senior Member of the State Council, Alwar.
- Major John Norman Macleod, M.B., Indian Medical Service, Civil Surgeon of Quetta.
- Henry Elworthy, Esq., Calcutta.

== Royal Victorian Order ==
=== Knight Commander (KCVO) ===
- Malcolm Morris, Esq., F.R.C.S. Edin.
