= T. R. Mahalingam (flautist) =

Tiruvidamarudur Ramaswamy Mahalingam
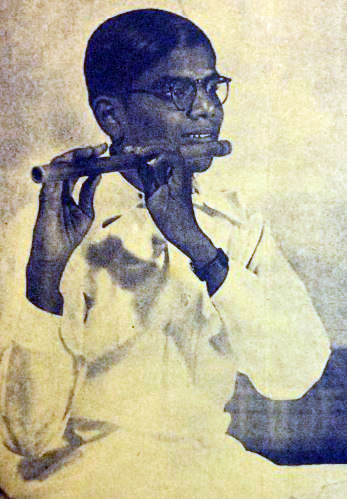
- Mahalingam in 1942

Background information
- Also known as: Mali
- Born: 6 November 1926
- Origin: Tiruvidaimarudur, Tamil Nadu, India
- Died: 31 May 1986 (aged 59)
- Genre: Carnatic music
- Occupation: Carnatic instrumentalist
- Instrument: Venu flute
- Years active: 1938–1986

Tiruvidaimarudur Ramaswamy Mahalingam (6 November 1926 – 31 May 1986), affectionately known as Mali, was a flautist who revolutionised the style of flute-playing in Carnatic music.

== Early life ==
He was born in Thiruvidaimarudur, Tanjavur district in Tamil Nadu to Ramaswami and Neelambal. His parents named him after Mahalingaswamy (Shiva), the deity of the nearby Hindu temple. He had an elder sister Devaki, an elder brother, three younger sisters and a younger brother. He started learning singing music from his maternal uncle Gopal, who ran a famous music school. At age five, he observed other boys playing the flute and secretly, against his father's wishes, he picked up a flute and learnt to play, in three speeds, the Viriboni Varnam in Bhairavi raga entirely by himself. As a boy, T.R. Mahalingam had the ability to play any song he heard after listening to it only once. As such, he quickly advanced through his music training.

== Technique ==
Mali was the founder of the popular style of flute playing followed today by the Carnatic flautists. Before Mali, the style of flute playing was called Sarabha Sastri style, popularised by Sarabha Sastri's disciple, Palladam Sanjiva Rao, and did not have any gamakas and involved playing the flute in discrete bursts. T.R. Mahalingam had breath control that enabled him to blow any single note over 40 seconds. This breath control let Mali give great volume to the lower octaves as well as the higher octaves. Mali introduced new fingering techniques, and a grip on the flute that came to be known as the "parrot clutch or the cross-fingering style ", allowing greater control. His style of continuous flute playing provided gamakas, and an ability to better imitate the human voice. In Carnatic music, instrumental music seeks to emulate vocal singing which is considered the ideal, and it was only with Mali's style did all the nuances of Carnatic music become possible to be expressed on the flute. His style prevailed over the Sarabha Shastri style whose last follower, Ramachandra Shastri, a disciple of Palladam Sanjeeva Rao, died in 1992. The loss of Sarabha Sastri style is only an academic loss and Mali's style of playing remains to this day unparalleled. Mali's techniques came into greater prominence under Dindigul SP Natarajan T.S.Sankaran, N. Ramani (who was his sister's son), B. N. Suresh, N. Kesi and have been carried forward by Mr.Viswanathan (son of Dindigul SP Natarajan) and students including Prapancham Sita Raman, L. Sundarachari (also known as L. Sundaram), B.G. Srinivasa, C.M.Madhuranath, B. Shankar Rao and B.M Sundar Rao.

T.R. Mahalingam's technique also led to a redesign of the bamboo flute: He made his flute reeds thicker and the holes smaller- producing a warm, rich tone. Also, unlike others before him, Mali drilled eight holes in the flute. "It was the eighth and extra hole that helped provide Mali with the extraordinary control he had on the instrument." – Prof. P. Sambamurthy, musicologist.

== Music and career ==
His first concert was in 1933 at the Thyagaraja festival in Mylapore, at the age of seven. At the concert, two stalwarts in the audience, Parur Sundaram Iyer and Musiri Subramania Iyer, were so impressed that they left the concert to bring ponnadai (shawls) to drape around the boy's shoulders, a great honour usually reserved for Carnatic music veterans. After this successful debut, his father put him on a hectic touring and performing schedule, leading to resentment on the boy's part. It was also hard to persuade well-known musicians to accompany him. However, within a very short time, Mali was being accompanied by some of the best accompanists in the realm, including Chowdiah, Papa Venkataramaiah, Kumbakonam Azhagianambi Pillai, and Tanjavur Vaidyanatha Iyer. Later in his career, he worked with the legendary Palghat Mani Iyer and Palani Subramaniam Pillai. Chembai Vaidyanatha Bhagavatar once picked up the violin to accompany Mali. However, it was Palghat Mani Iyer whose pairing with Mali became the most well known. "Only Mali gives me work for my hands" – Mani Iyer.

"When Semmangudi Srinivasa Iyer was asked to list the great geniuses of Carnatic music, he thought of only three names: T.R. Mahalingam, T.N. Rajarathnam Pillai and Palghat Mani Iyer. That Mali came first to the mind of the aging grandsire of music spoke eloquently of his unquestioned virtuosity on the flute."- V. Sriram, Carnatic Summer.

In performance, Mali would sometimes leave off halfway through an idea, or play the same piece repeatedly, or simply breathe into the flute occasionally. On the other hand, he would sometimes play hours longer than the schedule, including playing for the Lord Muruga at Tiruttani for eight hours continuously. Due to this same eccentric nature, he developed a reputation for playing truant at concerts, often turning up late (or not at all). Yet, it was less out of a disregard for people, and more out of a sense of anti-idolization and self-effacement. In some cases, he caused the audience to wait several hours past the scheduled concert time, then would play for a few minutes, and abruptly leave. Although this sparked outrage and alienated Mali from many of his peers, the situation was quite different from what it may have seemed, according to his disciple Sundaram:

"Mali says he sees god within five minutes of playing – he thinks it is meaningless to continue after that and stops."

Mali also enjoyed challenging his accompanists with difficult musical progressions, and tricking them into making mistakes. The only accompanist he gave full rein to was the elder violinist Papa Venkataramaiah, whom he considered his mentor. He himself was an accomplished violinist, and claimed to be better on the violin than on the flute. He was also responsible for the initial encouragement to T N Krishnan's career.

== Awards ==
Mali mentioned many times that he did not care for any praise or awards for his music, ideals that he upheld to the very end. Shortly before his death, he was awarded India's highly prestigious Padma Bhushan for music in January 1986, which he flatly refused.

== Death and legacy ==
After moving to Bangalore in 1955, he went to seclusion in 1958, playing very infrequently. From 1980 to 1985 he lived in the United States with his American wife, Ellen Chadwick. In 1985 T.R. Mahalingam decided to return to India, and after a short time in Bangalore, he came down to Chennai and died of a cerebral haemorrhage in 1986 at the age of 59, leaving behind him an indelible mark that changed the face of Carnatic music on the flute forever.

== Discography ==
- Carnatic Flute
- Krishna Gana Sabha 1953
- T.R. Mahalingam
- T.R. Mahalingam 2
- All India Radio Recordings
- Divine Sounds of the Bamboo Flute Vol 1 & 2
- One and only Mali
- Sitapati
- Akashvani Sangeet: Recorded in 1962
- Immortal Music of T.R. Mahalingam. Vol. 1 &2
- Flûte en concert – Inde du sud (STIL 0212), 1979
