= Iyer =

Tamil Brahmin caste

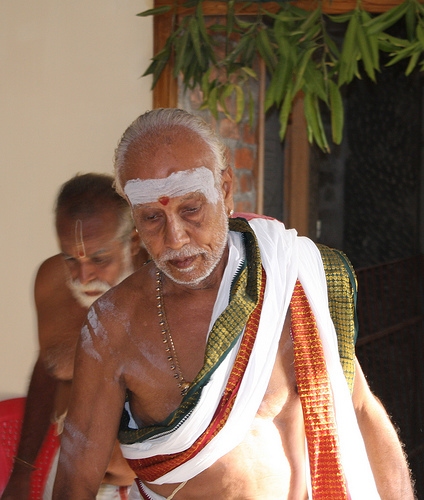
- Vadama Iyer priests
- Varna: Brahmin
- Guru: Ādi Śaṅkarā
- Religions: Hinduism
- Languages: Tamil, Sanskrit
- Country: India
- Original state: Tamil Nadu
- Populated states: Tamil Nadu, Kerala, Karnataka
- Family names: Iyer, Sastri, Bhattar
- Subdivisions: Vadama; Brahacaraṇam; Dīkṣitar; Aṣṭasāhasram; Śōḻiya
- Related groups: Kerala Iyers Iyengars Vaidiki Brahmins Vaidiki Velanadu Havyaka Brahmin Hoysala Karnataka Brahmins Sthanika Brahmins Babburkamme

Iyers (Tamil pronunciation: [ajːɐr]) (also spelt as Ayyar, Aiyar, Ayer, or Aiyer) are an ethnoreligious community of Tamil Brahmins. Most Iyers are followers of the Advaita philosophy propounded by Adi Shankara and adhere to the Smarta tradition. This is in contrast to the Iyengar community, who are adherents of Sri Vaishnavism. The Iyers and the Iyengars are together referred to as Tamil Brahmins. The majority of Iyers reside in Tamil Nadu, India.

Iyers are further divided into various denominations based on traditional and regional differences. Like all Brahmins, they are also classified based on their gotra, or patrilineal descent, and the Veda that they follow. They fall under the Pancha Dravida Brahmana classification of Brahmins in India.

Apart from the prevalent practice of using the title "Iyer" as surname, Iyers also commonly use other surnames, such as Sāstri or Bhattar.

== Etymology ==
Iyer (Tamil: ஐயர், pronounced [aɪjəɾ]) has several meanings in Tamil and other Dravidian languages, often referring to a respectable person. The Dravidian Etymological Dictionary lists various meanings for the term such as "father, sage, priest, teacher, brahman, superior person, master, king" with cognates such as tamayan meaning "elder brother" and simply ai "lord, master, husband, king, guru, priest, teacher, father". Linguistic sources often derive the words Ayya, Ayira/Ayyira as Prakrit versions of the Sanskrit word Ārya which means 'noble'.

In ancient times, Iyers were also called Anthanar or Pārppān, though the usage of the word Pārppān is considered derogatory in modern times. Until recent times, Kerala Iyers were called Pattars. Like the term pārppān, the word Pattar too is considered derogatory.

== Population and distribution ==
Today, Iyers live all over South India, but an overwhelming majority of Iyers continue to thrive in Tamil Nadu. Tamil Brahmins form an estimated less than 3 per cent of the state's total population and are distributed all over the state. However, accurate statistics on the population of the Iyer community are unavailable.

Iyers are also found in fairly appreciable number in Western and Southern districts of Tamil Nadu. Iyers of the far south are called Tirunelveli Iyers and speak the Tirunelveli Brahmin dialect.

=== Migration ===
First-generation descendants of Mysore S. Ramaswamy Iyer. Ramaswamy Iyer migrated from Ganapathy Agraharam to Mysore in the 19th century and served as the first Advocate-General of Mysore

Over the last few centuries, many Iyers have migrated and settled in parts of Karnataka. During the rule of the Mysore Maharajahs, many Iyers from the then Madras province migrated to Mysore. The Ashtagrama Iyers are also a prominent group of Iyers in Karnataka.

Iyers have also been resident of the princely state of Travancore from ancient times. The Venad state (present Kanyakumari district) and the southern parts of Kerala was part of the Pandyan kingdom known as Then Pandi Nadu. There were also many Iyers in Venad which later on grew to be the Travancore state. The old capital of Travancore was Padmanabhapuram which is at present in Kanyakumari district. There has also been a continuous inflow from Tirunelveli and Ramnad districts of Tamil Nadu which are contiguous to the erstwhile princely state of Travancore. Many parts of the present Tirunelveli district were even part of the old Travancore state. These Iyers are known today as Trivandrum Iyers. Some of these people migrated to Cochin and later to Palakkad and Kozhikode districts. There were also migrations from Tanjore district of Tamil Nadu to Palakkad. Their descendants are known today as Palakkad Iyers. These Iyers are collectively now called as Kerala Iyers. In Coimbatore, there are many such Iyers due to its proximity to Kerala.

Apart from South India, Iyers have also migrated to and settled in places in North India. There are significantly large Iyer communities in Mumbai, and Delhi. These migrations, which commenced during the British rule, were often undertaken in search of better prospects and contributed to the prosperity of the community.

Much earlier, Iyers have also came to Sri Lanka. According to the Buddhist scripture Mahavamsa, the presence of Brahmins have been recorded in Sri Lanka as early as 500 BCE when the first migrations from the Indian mainland supposedly took place. Brahmins used to be an influent constituent of the Sri Lankan Tamil minority, despite their negligible demography. It is also believed that they have played a historic role in the formation of the Jaffna Kingdom. However, the current Tamil Brahmin population of Ceylon, composed exclusively of the Iyer caste, is relatively recent. Most of its members are of Indian origin and have settled on the island since the second half of the 18th century, particularly with the rise of the Hindu revival movement in the northern region. They are almost solely committed to priestly duties, serving as officiants or assistants in both temple and domestic worship.

In recent times Iyers have also migrated in significant numbers to the United Kingdom, Europe and the United States in search of better fortune.

== Subsects ==
Iyers have many sub-sects among them, such as Vadama, Brahacharnam or Brahatcharanam, Vāthima, Sholiyar or Chozhiar, Ashtasahasram, Mukkāni, Gurukkal, Kāniyālar and Prathamasāki. Each sub-sect is further subdivided according to the village or region of origin.

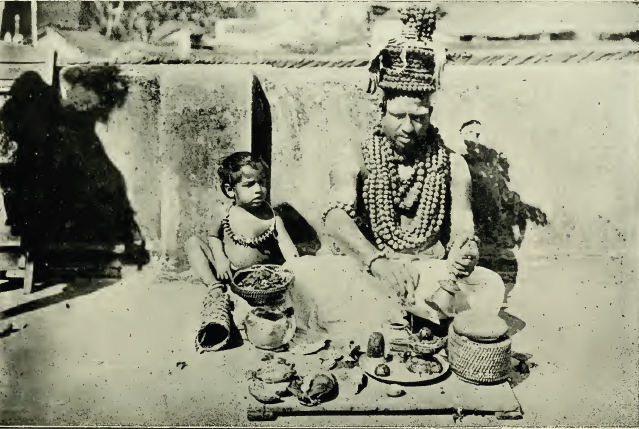
A Tamil Smartha Brahmin holy man engaged in Siva-worship. His body is covered by coat and chains made of Rudrāksha beads

Caste-mark of the Vadamas

Iyers, like all other Brahmins, trace their paternal ancestry to one of the eight rishis or sages. Accordingly, they are classified into eight gotras based on the rishi they have descended from. A maiden in the family belongs to gotra of her father, but upon marriage takes the gotra of her husband.

The Vedas are further sub-divided into shakhas or "branches" and followers of each Veda are further sub-divided based on the shakha they adhere to. However, only a few of the shakhas are extant, the vast majority of them having disappeared. The different Vedas and the corresponding shakhas that exist today in Tamil Nadu are:

Veda	shākhā
Rig Veda	Shakala and Paingi
Yajur Veda	Kanva and Taittiriya
Sama Veda	Kauthuma, Jaiminiya/Talavakara, Shatyayaniya and Gautama
Atharva Veda	Shaunakiya and Paippalada

== Culture ==
=== Rituals ===
Iyer rituals comprise rites as described in Hindu scriptures such as Apastamba Sutra attributed to the Hindu sage Apastamba. The most important rites are the Shodasa Samaskāras or the 16 duties. Although many of the rites and rituals followed in antiquity are no longer practised, some have been retained.

Iyers from South India performing the Sandhya Vandhanam, 1913

Iyer priest from Tamil Nadu carrying out a small ritual with his grandson.

Iyers are initiated into rituals at the time of birth. In ancient times, rituals used to be performed when the baby was being separated from mother's umbilical cord. This ceremony is known as Jātakarma. However, this practice is no longer observed. At birth, a horoscope is made for the child based on the position of the stars. The child is then given a ritual name. On the child's birthday, a ritual is performed to ensure longevity. This ritual is known as Ayushya Homam. This ceremony is held on the child's birthday reckoned as per the Tamil calendar based on the position of the nakshatras or stars and not the Gregorian calendar. The child's first birthday is the most important and is the time when the baby is formally initiated by piercing the ears of the boy or girl. From that day onwards a girl is expected to wear earrings.

A second initiation (for the male child in particular) follows when the child crosses the age of seven. This is the Upanayana ceremony during which a Brahmana is said to be reborn. A three-piece cotton thread is installed around the torso of the child encompassing the whole length of his body from the left shoulder to the right hip. The Upanayana ceremony of initiation is solely performed for the members of the dvija or twice-born castes, generally when the individual is between 7 and 16 years of age. In ancient times, the Upanayana was often considered as the ritual which marked the commencement of a boy's education, which in those days consisted mostly of the study of the Vedas. However, with the Brahmins taking to other vocations than priesthood, this initiation has become more of a symbolic ritual. The neophyte was expected to perform the Sandhya Vandanam on a regular basis and utter a prescribed set of prayers, three times a day: dawn, mid-day, and dusk. The most sacred and prominent of the prescribed set of prayers is the Gayatri Mantra, which is as sacred to the Hindus as the Six Kalimas to the Muslims and Ahunwar to the Zoroastrians. Once a year, Iyers change their sacred thread. This ritual is exclusive to South Indian Brahmins and the day is commemorated in Tamil Nadu as Āvani Avittam.

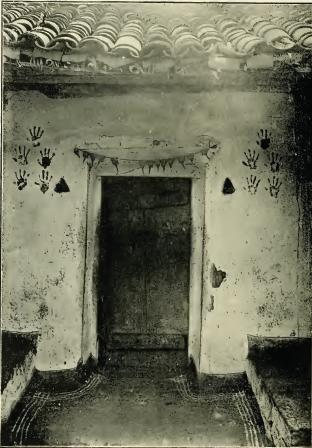
Brahmin house with hand marks to ward off the evil eye

Other important ceremonies for Iyers include the rites for the deceased. All Iyers are cremated according to Vedic rites, usually within a day of the individual's death. The death rites include a 13-day ceremony, and regular Tarpanam (performed every month thereafter, on Amavasya day, or New Moon Day), for the ancestors. There is also a yearly shrārddha, that must be performed. These rituals are expected to be performed only by male descendants of the deceased. Married men who perform this ritual must be accompanied by their wives. The women are symbolically important in the ritual to give a "consent" to all the proceedings in it.

=== Festivals ===
Iyers celebrate almost all Hindu festivals like Deepavali, Navratri, Pongal, Vinayaka Chathurthi, Janmaashtami, Tamil New Year, Sivarathri and Karthika Deepam. An important festival, exclusive to Brahmins of South India, is the Āvani Avittam festival.

=== Weddings ===
A typical Iyer wedding consists of Sumangali Prārthanai (Hindu prayers for prosperous married life), Nāndi (homage to ancestors), Nischayadhārtham (Engagement) and Mangalyadharanam (tying the knot). The main events of an Iyer marriage include Vratam (fasting), Kasi Yatra (pilgrimage to Kasi), Oonjal (Swing), Kanyadanam (placing the bride in the groom's care), Mangalyadharanam, Pānigrahanam and Saptapathi (or seven steps - the final and most important stage wherein the bride takes seven steps supported by the groom's palms thereby finalizing their union). This is usually followed by Nalangu, which is a casual and informal event.

=== Traditional ethics ===
Iyers generally lead orthodox lives and adhere steadfastly to their customs and traditions. Iyers follow the Grihya Sutras of Apastamba and Baudhayana. The society is patriarchal but not feudal.

Iyers are generally vegetarian. Some abjure onion and garlic on the grounds that they activate certain base senses. Cow milk and milk products were approved. They were required to avoid alcohol and tobacco.

Iyers follow elaborate purification rituals, both of self and the house. Men are forbidden from performing their "sixteen duties" while women are forbidden from cooking food without having a purificatory bath in the morning. Food is to be consumed only after making an offering to the deities.

The bathing was considered sufficiently purifying only if it conformed to the rules of madi. The word madi is used by Tamil Brahmins to indicate that a person is bodily pure. In order to practice madi, the Brahmin had to wear only clothes which had been recently washed and dried, and the clothes should remain untouched by any person who was not madi. Only after taking bath in cold water, and after wearing such clothes, would the person be in a state of madi. This practice of madi is followed by Iyers even in modern times, before participating in any kind of religious ceremony.

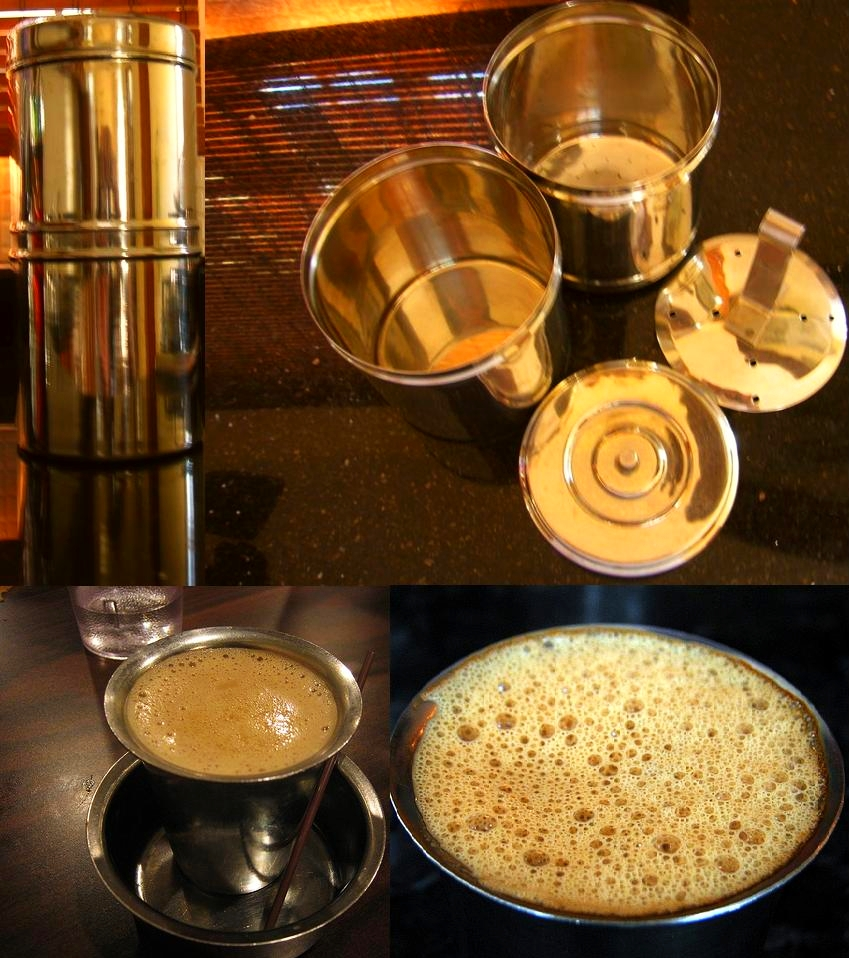
The Iyers have taken a special liking for filter coffee

.

=== Clothing ===
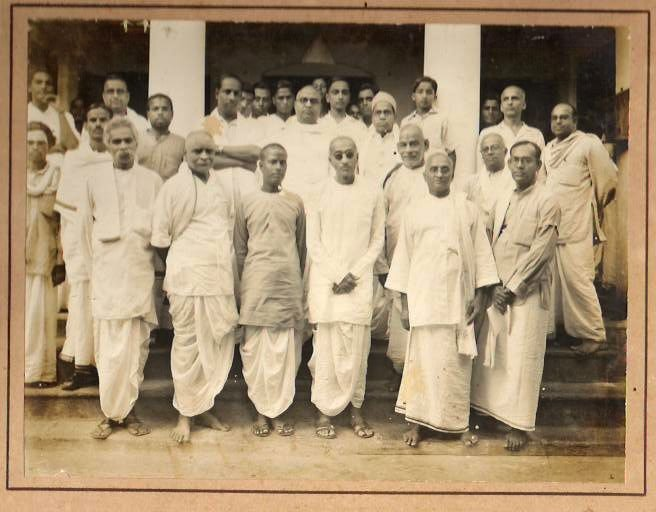
Tamil Brahmins (Iyers and Iyengars) in traditional veshti and angavastram at a convention of the Mylai Tamil Sangam, circa 1930s

Iyer men traditionally wear veshtis or dhotis which cover them from waist to foot. These are made of cotton and sometimes silk. Veshtis are worn in different styles. Those worn in typical Brahminical style are known as panchakacham (from the sanskrit terms pancha and gajam meaning "five yards" as the length of the panchakacham is five yards in contrast to the veshtis used in daily life which are four or eight cubits long). They sometimes wrap their shoulders with a single piece of cloth known as angavastram (body-garment). In earlier times, Iyer men who performed austerities also draped their waist or chests with deer skin or grass.

The traditional Iyer woman is draped in a nine-yard saree, also known as madisār.

=== Patronage of art ===
For centuries, Iyers have taken a keen interest in preserving the arts and sciences. They undertook the responsibility of preserving the Natya Shastra, a monumental work on Bharatanatyam, the classical dance form of Tamil Nadu. During the early 20th century, dance was usually regarded as a degenerate art associated with devadasis. Rukmini Devi Arundale, however, revived the dying art of Sadir into the more "respectable" art form of Bharatanatyam, thereby breaking social and caste taboos about Brahmins taking part in the study and practice of dance. However many have claimed that, rather than becoming more open to other communities, the practice of Bharatanatyam was then restricted specifically to the middle and upper classes of Tamil society.

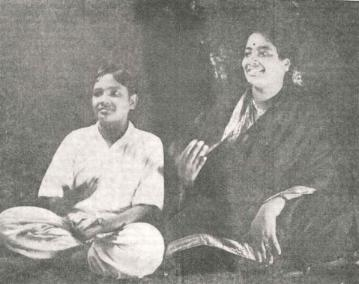
DK Pattammal (right), Classical Music Singer, in concert with her brother, DK Jayaraman; circa early 1940s.

However, compared to dance, the contribution of Iyers in field of music has been considerably noteworthy.

=== Food ===
The main diet of Iyers is composed of vegetarian food, mostly rice which is the staple diet for millions of South Indians. Vegetarian side dishes are frequently made in Iyer households apart from compulsory additions as rasam, sambar, etc. Home-made ghee is a staple addition to the diet, and traditional meals do not begin until ghee is poured over a heap of rice and lentils. The cuisine eschews the extent of spices and heat traditionally found in south Indian cuisine. Iyers are mostly known for their love for curd. Other South Indian delicacies such as dosas, idli, etc. are also relished by Iyers. Coffee amongst beverages and curd amongst food items form an indispensable part of the Iyer food menu.

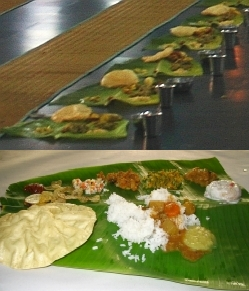
The diet of Iyers consists mainly of Tamil vegetarian cuisine, comprising rice

=== Housing ===
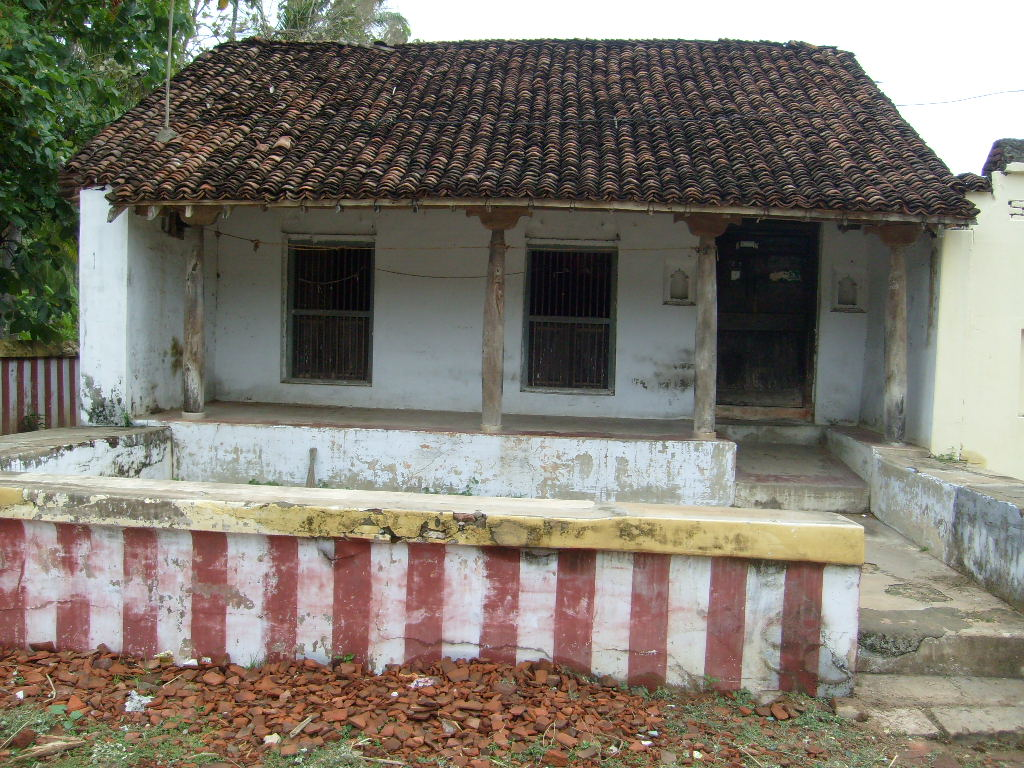
A house in a Tanjore agrahāram

In ancient times, Iyers, along with Iyengars and other Tamil Brahmins, lived in exclusive Brahmin quarters of their village known as an agrahāram. Shiva and Vishnu temples were usually situated at the ends of an agrahāram. In most cases, there would also be a fast-flowing stream or river nearby.

A typical agrahāram consisted of a temple and a street adjacent to it. The houses on either side of the street were exclusively peopled by Brahmins who followed a joint family system. All the houses were identical in design and architecture though not in size.

With the arrival of the British and commencement of the Industrial Revolution, Iyers started moving to cities for their sustenance. Starting from the late 19th century, the agrahārams were gradually discarded as more and more Iyers moved to towns and cities to take up lucrative jobs in the provincial and judicial administration.

However, there are still some agrahārams left where traditional Iyers continue to reside. In an Iyer residence, people wash their feet first with water on entering the house.

=== Language ===
Tamil is the mother tongue of most Iyers residing in India and elsewhere. However, Iyers speak a distinct dialect of Tamil unique to their community. This dialect of Tamil is known as Brāhmik or Brahmin Tamil. Brahmin Tamil is highly Sanskritized and has often invited ridicule from Tamil purists due to its extensive usage of the Sanskrit vocabulary. While Brahmin Tamil used to be the lingua franca for inter-caste communication between different Tamil communities during pre-independence times, it has been gradually discarded by Brahmin themselves in favour of regional dialects.

== Iyers today ==
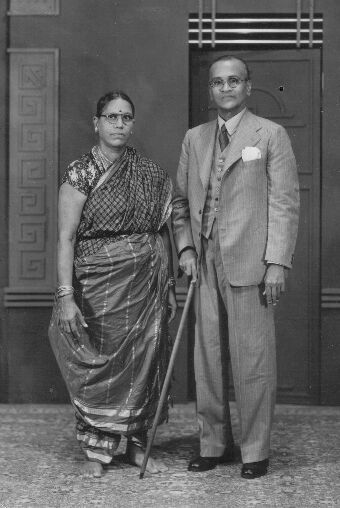
A Tamil Brahmin couple, circa 1945

In addition to their earlier occupations, Iyers today have diversified into a variety of fields. Three of India's Nobel laureates, Sir C. V. Raman, Subrahmanyan Chandrasekhar and Venkatraman Ramakrishnan hail from the community.

Since ancient times, Iyers, as members of the privileged priestly class, exercised a near-complete domination over educational, religious and literary institutions in the Tamil country. Their domination continued throughout the British Raj as they used their knowledge of the English language and education to dominate politics, administration, the courts and intelligentsia. Upon India's independence in 1947, they tried to consolidate their hold on the administrative and judicial machinery. Such a situation led to resentment from the other castes in Tamil Nadu, the result of this atmosphere was a "non-Brahmin" movement and the formation of the Justice Party. Periyar, who took over as Justice Party President in the 1940s, changed its name to Dravida Kazhagam, and formulated the view that Tamil Brahmins were Aryans as opposed to non-Brahmin Tamils who were Dravidian. The ensuing anti-Brahminism and the rising unpopularity of the Rajaji Government left an indelible mark on the Tamil Brahmin community ending their political aspirations. In the 1960s the Dravida Munnetra Kazhagam (roughly translated as "Organisation for Progress of Dravidians") and its subgroups gained political ground on this platform forming state ministries, thereby wrenching control from the Indian National Congress, in which Iyers at that time were holding important party positions. Today, apart from a few exceptions, Iyers have virtually disappeared from the political arena.

In 2006, the Tamil Nadu government took the decision to appoint non-Brahmin priests in Hindu temples in order to curb Brahmin ecclesiastical domination. This created a huge controversy. Violence broke out in March 2008 when a non-Brahmin oduvar or reciter of Tamil idylls, empowered by the Government of Tamil Nadu, tried to make his way into the sanctum sanctorum of the Nataraja temple at Chidambaram.

== Criticism ==
=== Relations with other communities ===
The legacy of Iyers have often been marred by accusations of racism and counter-racism against them by non-Brahmins and vice versa.

Grievances and instances of discrimination by Brahmins are believed to be the main factors which fuelled the Dravidian Movement. With the dawn of the 20th century, and the rapid penetration of western education and western ideas, there was a rise in consciousness amongst the lower castes who felt that rights which were legitimately theirs were being denied to them. This led the non-Brahmins to agitate and form the Justice Party in 1916, which later became the Dravidar Kazhagam. The Justice Party banked on vehement anti-Hindu and anti-Brahmin propaganda to ease Brahmins out of their privileged positions. Gradually, the non-Brahmin replaced the Brahmin in every sphere and destroyed the monopoly over education and the administrative services which the Brahmin had previously held.

The concept of "Brahmin atrocities" is refuted by some Tamil Brahmin historians. They argue that allegations of casteism against Tamil Brahmins have been exaggerated and that even prior to the rise of the Dravida Kazhagam, a significant section of Tamil Brahmin society was liberal and anti-casteist, for example the Temple Entry Proclamation passed by the princely state of Travancore which gave people of all castes the right to enter Hindu temples in the princely state was due to the efforts of the Dewan of Travancore, Sir C. P. Ramaswamy Iyer who was an Iyer.

Dalit leader and founder of political party Pudiya Tamizhagam, Dr. Krishnasamy admits that the Anti-Brahmin Movement had not succeeded in improving the rights of Dalits and that there continues to be as much discrimination of Dalits as had been before.

So many movements have failed. In Tamil Nadu there was a movement in the name of anti-Brahmanism under the leadership of Periyar. It attracted Dalits, but after 30 years of power, the Dalits understand that they are as badly-off - or worse-off - as they were under the Brahmans. Under Dravidian rule, they have been attacked and killed, their due share in government service is not given, they are not allowed to rise.

=== Alleged negative attitude towards Tamil language and culture ===
Iyers have been called Sanskritists who entertained a distorted and contemptuous attitude towards Tamil language, culture and civilization. The Dravidologist Kamil Zvelebil says that the Brahmin was chosen as a scapegoat by the Dravidian parties to answer for the decline of Tamil civilization and culture in the medieval and post-medieval periods. Despite these allegations many Iyers were great contributors to the Tamil language. Agathiar, usually identified with the legendary Vedic sage Agastya is credited with compiling the first rules of grammar of the Tamil language. Moreover, individuals like U. V. Swaminatha Iyer and Subramanya Bharathi have made invaluable contributions to Tamil literature. Parithimar Kalaignar was the first to campaign for the recognition of Tamil as a classical language.

== Portrayal in popular media ==
Brahmins are mentioned for the first time in the works of Sangam poets. During the post sangam era, Brahmin saints have been frequently praised for their efforts in combating Buddhism. In modern times, when Iyers and Iyengars control a significant percentage of the print and visual media, there has been significant coverage of Brahmins and Brahmin culture in magazines and periodicals and a number of Brahmin characters in novels, TV serials and films.

Their portrayal in media started to become more negative with the rise of Dravidian political movements. The writings and speeches of many Dravidian political activists such as Iyothee Thass, Maraimalai Adigal, Periyar, Bharatidasan, C. N. Annadurai, the leaders of Justice Party in the early 20th century and of the Dravidar Kazhagam in more modern times constitute much of modern anti-Brahmin rhetoric.

Starting from the 1940s onwards, Annadurai and the Dravida Munnetra Kazhagam have been using films and the mass media for the propagation of their political ideology. Most of the films made, such as the 1952-blockbuster Parasakthi written by future Chief minister M. Karunanidhi, are anti-Brahminical in character.

== Notable people ==
Some of the early members of the community to gain prominence were sages and religious scholars like Agatthiar, Tholkappiyar (Tirunadumakini), Parimelalhagar and Naccinarkiniyar. Prior to the 19th century, almost all prominent members of this community hailed from religious or literary spheres. Tyagaraja, Syama Sastri and Muthuswamy Dīkshitar, who constitute the "Trinity of Carnatic music" were probably the first verified historical personages from the community, as the accounts or biographies of those who lived earlier appear semi-legendary in character. Most of the Dewans of the princely state of Travancore during the 19th century were Tamil Brahmins (Iyers and Iyengars).

- Nethra Raghuram, Indian model who won Femina Magazine Look of the Year contest 1997
- Shankar Mahadevan, Music director

== See also ==
- Forward Castes
- Tamil Brahmins
