= Vadama =

Sub-sect of the Iyer community of Tamil Brahmins

Regions with significant populations
- Indian states of Tamil Nadu, Kerala and Andhra Pradesh

Languages
- Brahmin Tamil

Religion
- Hinduism

Related ethnic groups
- Iyer, Vadagalai Iyengar, Tamil people, Deshastha Brahmin

Vadama, meaning "Northern", are a sub-sect of the Iyer community of Tamil Brahmins. While some believe that their name is an indication of the fact that they were the most recent Brahmin migrants to the Tamil country, others interpret the usage of the term "Vadama" as a reference to their strict adherence to the Sanskrit language and Vedic rituals which are of northerly origin.

== Etymology ==
The term Vadama may have originated from the Tamil term Vadakku meaning North, indicating the Northern origin of the Vadama Brahmins. However, what is not certain is whether 'North' refers to northern Tamil Nadu/Southern Deccan, or regions farther north. Other scholars are of the opinion that rather than the superficial indication of a northern origin for the people, the term "vadama" would rather refer to proficiency in Sanskrit and Vedic ritual, generally associated with the north prior to the first millennium CE.

== Sub-categories ==
Vadamas are further sub-divided into five categories

- Vadadesa Vadama (Vadamas of the northern country)
- Choladesa Vadama (Vadamas of the Chola country)
- Sabhaiyar(member of the conference (Sabha))
- Injee and
- Thummagunta Dravida.

== History ==
Some historians hold that all Brahmins who migrated to the far-south during and after the age of the Gupta Emperors, locally the Kalabhra interregnum came to be classified as Vadama.

=== Second millennium ===
==== 14th and 15th centuries ====
Instability prevailed in Peninsular India in the aftermath of the Tughlaqs victory over Yadavas of Deogiri and Kakatiyas of Warangal in the early 14th century. In response to the Moslem irruptions the Kingdom of Vijayanagar was founded in 1336, and came to be locked in an existential struggle with the Bahmani Sultanate from 1347 to 1490, when the Moslem state broke up. This early period was marked by much strife, especially in the jihads of Taj ud-Din Firuz Shah (1397–1422) and his brother Ahmad Shah I Wali (1422–1435), when thousands of Hindus, especially Brahmins, were enslaved and temples of the northern Deccan desecrated. The oppression was also felt in the eastern peninsula as far as the Gajapati Kingdom where, for instance in 1478, Muhammad Shah III Lashkari (1463–1482) demolished the Great Temple of Kondavidu and was acclaimed as a ghazi, for personally decapitating all the Brahmins. Such excesses induced Brahmins to seek refuge in the realms of Vijayanagar, where many were appointed karnams (bailiffs) in preference to other castes, from the reign of Harihara I (1336–1357) onward.

==== Early 16th century ====
After the division of the Bahmani Sultanate in 1490, into the Sultanates of Bijapur, Golconda, Ahmadnagar and Berar, the armies of Vijayanagar were successful in fending of invasions and restricting the Sultanates to Central India, especially in the reign of Krishnadeva Raya (1509–1529), who also began the practice of appointing Brahmins as commanders of strategically important forts.

==== 16th and 17th centuries ====
Relative peace prevailed until the Battle of Talikota, in 1565, when Rama Raya of Vijayanagar was killed and the capital city razed to the ground. The land, in addition to being plundered by the combined armies of the Sultanates, came to be oppressed by renegade polygars and bandits whose rise commenced with the destruction of the central power. The Mogul invasion of Peninsular India and the depredations of the Deccan by the Mahrattas under Shivaji also began early in the 17th century.

The relatives and family members of C. P. Ramaswami Iyer, a Vadadesa Vadama, believed that they were descended from Brahmins of the Desh region of Maharashtra and Madhya Pradesh who migrated to Chittoor district of Andhra Pradesh from where they migrated to the northern part of Tamil Nadu in the 16th century where they were granted the village of Chetpet by a local chieftain.

==== 17th century to the present ====
During the 19th century, the Vadamas along with other Tamil Brahmins made ample use of the opportunities provided by British rule to dominate the civil services, legislature and the judiciary in the Madras Presidency. Throughout the second half of the 19th century and the early 20th century there was intense political rivalry between the Vadamas and the Brahacharanams for the domination of Brahmin villages called agraharams.

== Traditional occupation ==
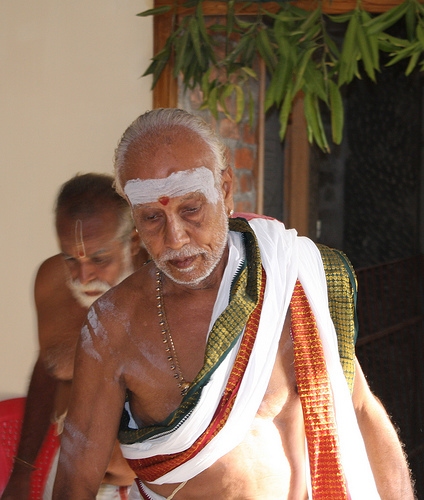
Vadama Purohitas in Tamil Nadu

Sociologist Andre Beteille, in his thesis Caste, class, and power: changing patterns of stratification in a Tanjore village, describes them as the biggest mirasidars among the Iyer community. They may also have organised the agraharams' defence in turbulent times for though there were not many who joined the army, they were not specifically forbidden to take to arms.

In the 19th century, as with other Iyers, many of the Vadama joined, the judiciary of British India as lawyers and judges, or served in the Indian Civil and Revenue Services. Many others continued in the service of the kings of the princely states of Travancore, Mysore, Pudukottai, and Ramnad.

== Religious practices ==
The crescent or U-mark applied with the Gopichandanam is mostly used as caste mark by the Vadamas

The Vadama traditionally claim to be superior to other classes of Iyers.

Vadamas have also significantly contributed towards popularizing and propagating the worship of Shiva and Devi.

== Notables ==
=== Religion ===
- Appayya Dikshitar and nephew Neelakanta Deekshitar legendary scholars who re-established Advaita philosophy's predominance in the South belonged to the Vadadesa Vadama sect and migrated from places near Nasik. They were especially patronised by the rulers of Vellore and Madurai, Chinnabomma Nayak and Tirumalai Nayak, respectively.

=== Military ===
- Nilakanta Krishnan - Recipient of the Distinguished Service Cross (United Kingdom) for his services to the Royal Indian Navy during the Second World War. Commanded the aircraft carrier, INS Vikrant in the Bay of Bengal during Indo-Pakistani War of 1971: was also the Flag officer commanding for the Eastern Naval Command of the Indian Navy during this war.

=== Arts ===
- Syama Sastri, one of the doyens of Carnatic Music, a descendant of a group of Vadadesa Vadama who fled Conjeeveram in the wake of a Muslim attack.
- Muthuswamy Dikshitar, Carnatic musician
- Gopalakrishna Bharathi, his father Ramaswami Bharathi and grandfather Kothandarama Bharathi, a family of eminent Carnatic musicians
- F.G. Natesa Iyer (1880–1963), founder of Rasika Ranjana Sabha, Trichy, talent scout, officer of the South Indian Railway Company, pioneered modern Tamil drama, Tamil cinema actor, also elected Mayor of Trichy in the 1920s

== Politics ==
- Swaminathan Gurumurthy, activist
- Subramanian Swamy, Indian politician
- H. Raja, Indian politician
