= Iyengar =

Tamil Brahmin community

ஐயங்கார்
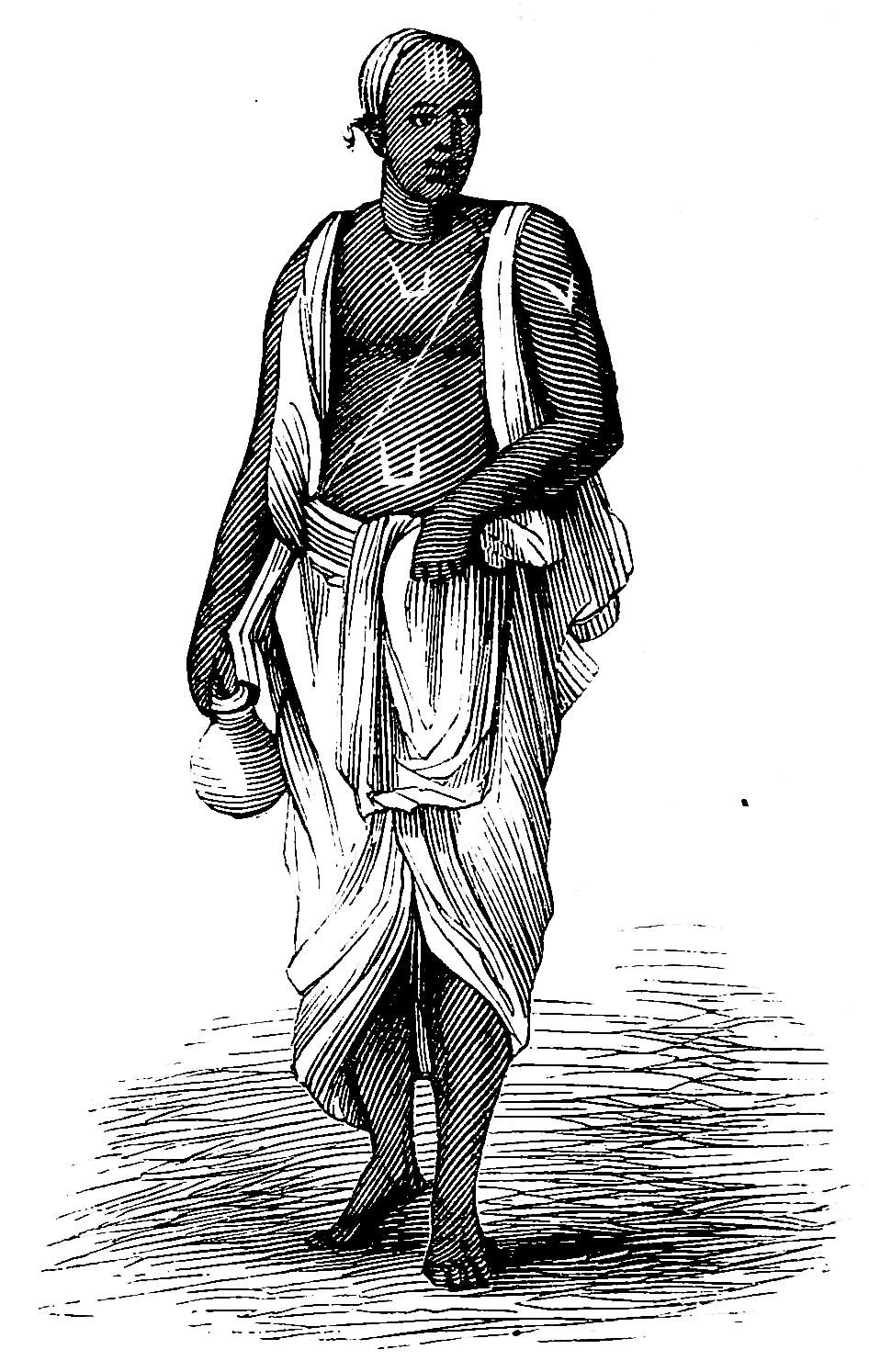
- A 19th century illustration of an Iyengar man

Regions with significant populations
- India; Tamil Nadu, Karnataka, Andhra Pradesh, Telangana

Languages
- Tamil (Iyengar Tamil), Sanskrit (liturgical)

Religion
- Hinduism (Sri Vaishnavism)

Related ethnic groups
- Tamil Brahmins

Iyengars (Note: Iyengar is the British English spelling, and Aiyaṅgār is the Romanized spelling from Indic scripts.) (also spelt Ayyangar, Aiyengar, or Aiyangar, pronounced [ɐjːɐŋɡaːr]) are an ethnoreligious community of Tamil-speaking Hindu Brahmins, whose members follow Sri Vaishnavism and the Visishtadvaita philosophy propounded by Ramanuja. Iyengars are divided into two denominations, the Vadakalai and the Tenkalai and live mostly in the Southern Indian states of Tamil Nadu, Karnataka, and Andhra Pradesh. The community belongs to the Pancha Dravida Brahmana classification of Brahmins in India.

== Etymology ==
There are several opinions regarding the etymology of the term Iyengar, which is the anglicized form of the Dravidian word Aiyaṅgār (Tamil: ஐயங்கார், pronounced [əjəŋɡɑːɾ]).

One is that it derives from the Proto-Dravidian word ayya-gāru (𑀅𑀬𑀕𑀭𑀼), which became Ayyangāru (Tamil: அய்யங்காரு), and later Ayengar. The term ayya is the Tamil equivalent of the Sanskrit word ārya, (𑀆𑀭𑁆𑀬/आर्य) which in Sanskrit means noble. Gāru refers to a form of the Pali term gārava, and later gaurava, meaning respect or esteem.

Another is that the word ayyangār was first used by Kandhādai Ramanuja Ayyangār of Tirupati, around 1450 CE.

== History ==
=== Common origins ===
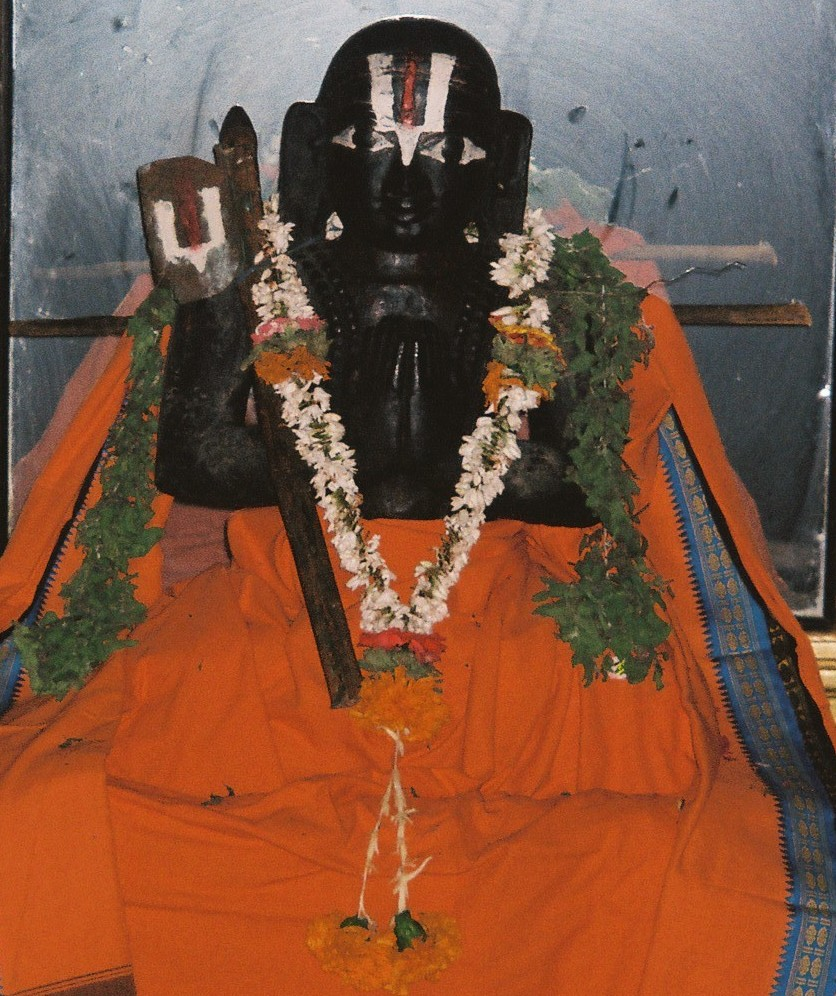
Ramanuja

The Iyengar community traces its philosophical origins to Nathamuni, the first Sri Vaishnava acharya, who lived around 900 CE. He is traditionally believed to have collected the 4,000 works of Nammalvar and other alvars, the poet-saints of Southern India who were intensely devoted to Vishnu on both an emotional and intellectual plane. The belief is that he set this collection - commonly called the Tamil Prabhandams - to music, and he introduced the devotional hymns of the alvars into worship, thus mixing their Tamil Veda with the traditional Vedas written in Sanskrit. A scriptural equivalence was accepted by the community that formed from his works. The Sanskrit texts are considered to be metaphysical truth and the Tamil oral variants to be based on human experience of the same. This community became immersed in the dual-language worship in temples where issues of varna were of no concern.

A century or so later, Ramanuja became the principal amongst religious leaders who formalized the efforts of Nathamuni as a theology. Ramanuja developed the philosophy of Visishtadvaita and is described by Harold Coward as "the founding interpreter of Sri Vaisnavite scripture," (Note: The traditional biographies of Ramanuja place his life in the period of 1017–1137 CE,) while Anne Overzee says that he was a collator and interpreter rather than an original thinker. Although showing originality in his method of synthesizing the Tamil and Sanskrit sources, Ranjeeta Dutta said that the two sets of sources "continued to be parallel to each other and not incorporative" at this time.

Nathamuni and Ramanuja were both Brahmins, while Nammalvar was of the Vellala community. All three men were Tamils, (Note: Nathamuni is thought to have been born at Viranarayana, Ramanuja was born at Sriperumbudur, and Nammalvar at Alvartirunakam.) although Ramanuja documented his thoughts in Sanskrit.

=== Schism ===
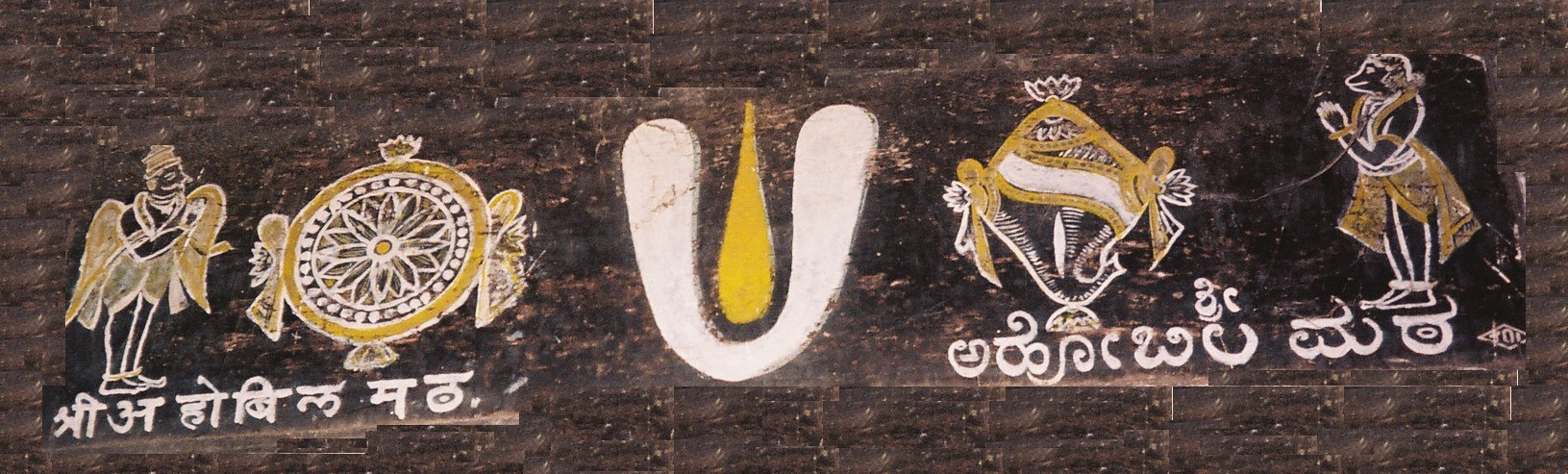
Vadakalai Urdhva Pundra

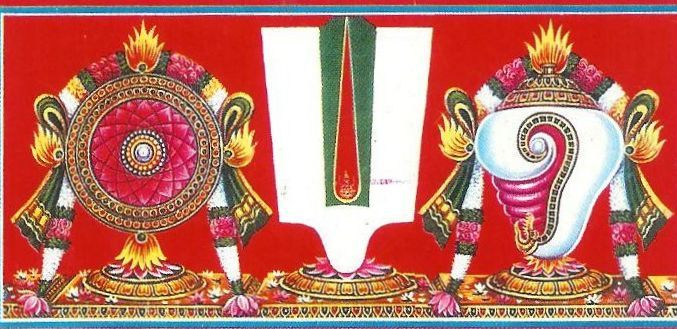
Tenkalai Urdhva Pundra

Ramanuja was initially a proponent of the traditional bhakti philosophy that demanded adherents have a good command of Sanskrit texts and a ritualized approach to life and devotion. This outlook marginalized women and members of the Shudra Varna because they were barred from learning the Sanskrit Vedas. Ramanuja later changed his position and became more receptive to a more inclusive theory. His metaphorical devices suggested that devotion through ritual "earned" salvation but also that salvation was given through the grace of God. Subsequently, some time around the fourteenth century, the Iyengar community divided into two sects. Both sects maintained a reverence for his works but were increasingly divided due to the doctrinal uncertainties evident in them.

The Vadakalai sect is referred to as the "Northern" culture or school, and the Tenkalai sect is the "Southern" culture or school. These cultures reference the perceived prominence given by the sects to the terse style of Sanskrit traditions and the lyrical Tamil Prabhandams, respectively. S. M. Srinivasa Chari believes this linguistic differentiation to be overstated. The Vadakalai favour Vedanta Desika as their acharya and the Tenkalai prefer instead the teachings of Manavala Mamuni. Chari notes that the sects share a common allegiance to Nammalvar and Ramanuja. and that their subsequent significant thinkers "wholly accepted the authority and importance" of both linguistic styles. (Note: S. Dasgupta is quoted by Thomas Manninezhath: "Though the leaders themselves were actuated by a spirit of sympathy with one another, yet their followers made much of these little differences in their views and constantly quarrelled with one another, and it is a well-known fact that these sectarian quarrels exist even now".) Harold Schiffman says that the linguistic schism reflects wider underlying doctrinal differences between the populist southern school and the social conservatism of the north, with Tamil historically being a language understood by the masses. while Sanskrit was elitist and "caste-bound".

Vedic philosophy holds that the supreme goal in life is to attain the blissful state of Brahman through moksha, being the process of liberation of the suffering soul from the cycle of reincarnation. Although eighteen points of difference between the two Iyengar sects are generally recognised, being referred to as the ashtadasa bhedas, most of these are minor. (Note: The eighteen sectarian differences are detailed in History of Sri Vaishnavism in the Tamil country (N. Jagadeesan, Koodal Publishers, 1977)) Abraham Eraly describes a principal difference, being

... their views on the nature of divine grace - while the Thenkalai holds that devotion is all that is necessary and that god will on his own initiative carry the devotee to salvation, like a cat carrying a kitten, the Vadakalai holds that man has to win god's grace through his efforts and he has to cling on to god, like an infant monkey clinging on to its mother.

Coward considers this to be the difference between the two schools of thought, and Carman says that "... both [sects] accord primacy to divine grace, but one group feels it necessary to insist that there is no human contribution at all to the attainment of salvation." These variations in interpretation of the nature of prapatti – loosely translated "self-surrender to god" – are called marjara nyaya and markata nyaya, referring to the young of cats and monkeys. They give rise to another naming convention for the two sects, being the "monkey school" and the "cat school".

Unlike the Vadakalai, the Tenkalai Iyengar sect reject the varna system, and accepted those of lower castes into their temples. The sect was founded by Pillai Lokacharya.

Vadakalai Iyengars believe that it is necessary to offer obeisance/prostration to God multiple times, while Tenkalai Iyengars believe that it is enough if you offer obeisance/prostration to God once. This is the reason why a Vadakalai Iyengar is often seen prostrating four times, while Tenkalai Iyengars are seen prostrating only once.

=== Sectarian rivalry ===
The sectarian rivalry has at times been bitter and, according to Andre Beteille, "aggressive". Thomas Manninezhath notes an intensification of disputes at the time of Thayumanavar in the eighteenth century and on other occasions legal processes have been used in attempts to settle the control of temples.

=== Relations with other communities ===
See Also: Criticism of Iyers, Brahminism, Anti-Brahminism, varna-Based Reservations in Tamil Nadu

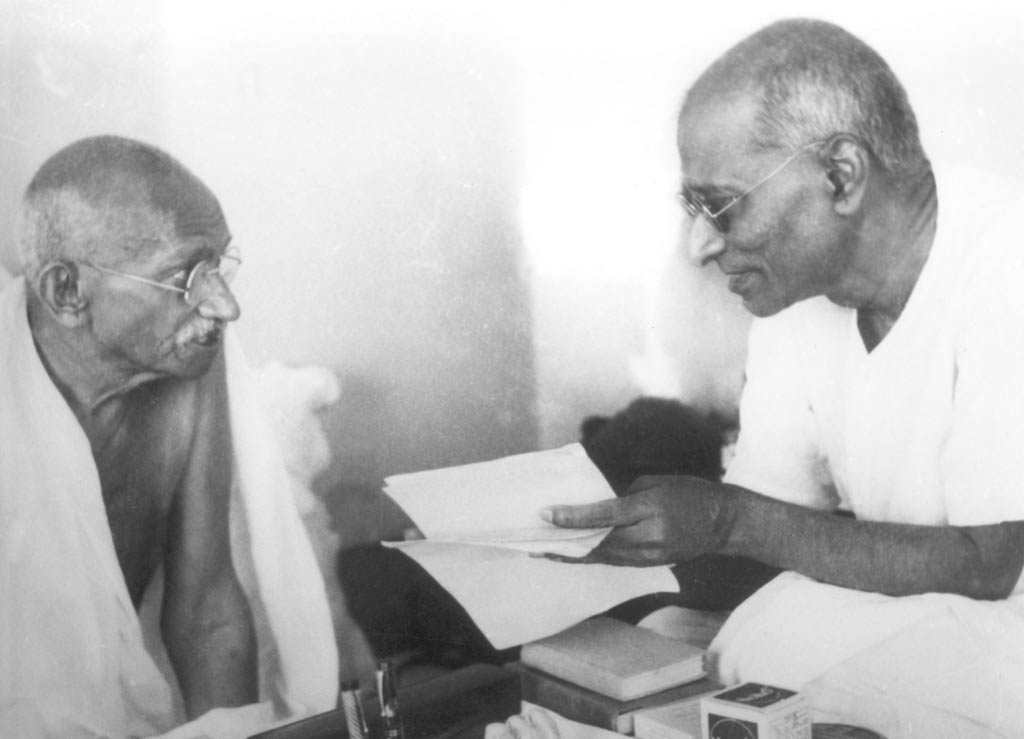
Chakravarti Rajagopalachari (right) has been the most prominent Iyengar in Indian politics

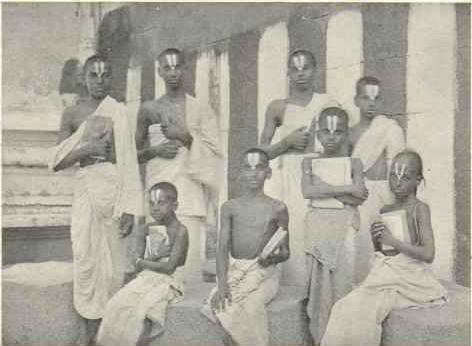
Iyengar children, Thanjavur, 1909.

Prior to the independence of India, Brahmins had a significant presence in the government posts and education system of Madras province, a part of which is now Tamil Nadu. Since independence, grievances and alleged instances of discrimination by Brahmins in Tamil Nadu are believed to be the main factors which fueled the Self-Respect Movement and marginalised them. This, in combination with the depressed economic and social conditions of non-Brahmins, led the non-Brahmins to agitate and form the Justice Party in 1916, which later became the Dravidar Kazhagam. The Justice Party banked on vehement anti-Hindu and anti-Brahmin propaganda to ease Brahmins out of their privileged positions. Gradually, the non-Brahmin replaced the Brahmin in every sphere and destroyed the monopoly over education and the administrative services which the Brahmin had previously held.

There were also accusations that they were Sanskritists who had a contemptuous attitude towards Tamil language, culture and civilisation. Kamil Zvelebil, a Dravidologist, argues from a study of the history of Tamil literature that this accusation is factually wrong. He notes that the Brahmin was chosen as a scapegoat to answer for the decline of Tamil civilisation and culture in the medieval and post-medieval periods.

== Subgroups ==
=== Hebbar ===
Hebbar Iyengar or Hebbari Srivaishnava is a caste of Hindu Brahmins of Tamil origin whose members follow the Visishtadvaita philosophy propounded by Ramanuja. They are found primarily in the Indian state of Karnataka especially in Southern Districts.

=== Mandayam ===
Mandayam Iyengars are a subgroup of Iyengars, settled in various parts of Karnataka, predominantly Melkote. Mandayam Iyengars also speak a different dialect of Tamil called as Mandayam Tamil. Mandayam Iyengars follow Ramanujacharya and Manavala Mamunigal. Mandyam Iyengars do not celebrate the popular Hindu festival of Diwali in remembrance of the day Tipu Sultan massacred close to 1500 men, women and children of this community on Diwali of 1773 in Srirangapatna.

Chelluru / Selvanallur

Chelluru Iyengars are a subgroup of Tenkalai Iyengars, believed to have migrated from Selvanallur ( a village in banks of Godavari) and settled in and around Madurai as early as 9th Century. Chelluru Iyengars follow Ramanujacharya and Manavala Mamunigal.

== Wedding customs ==
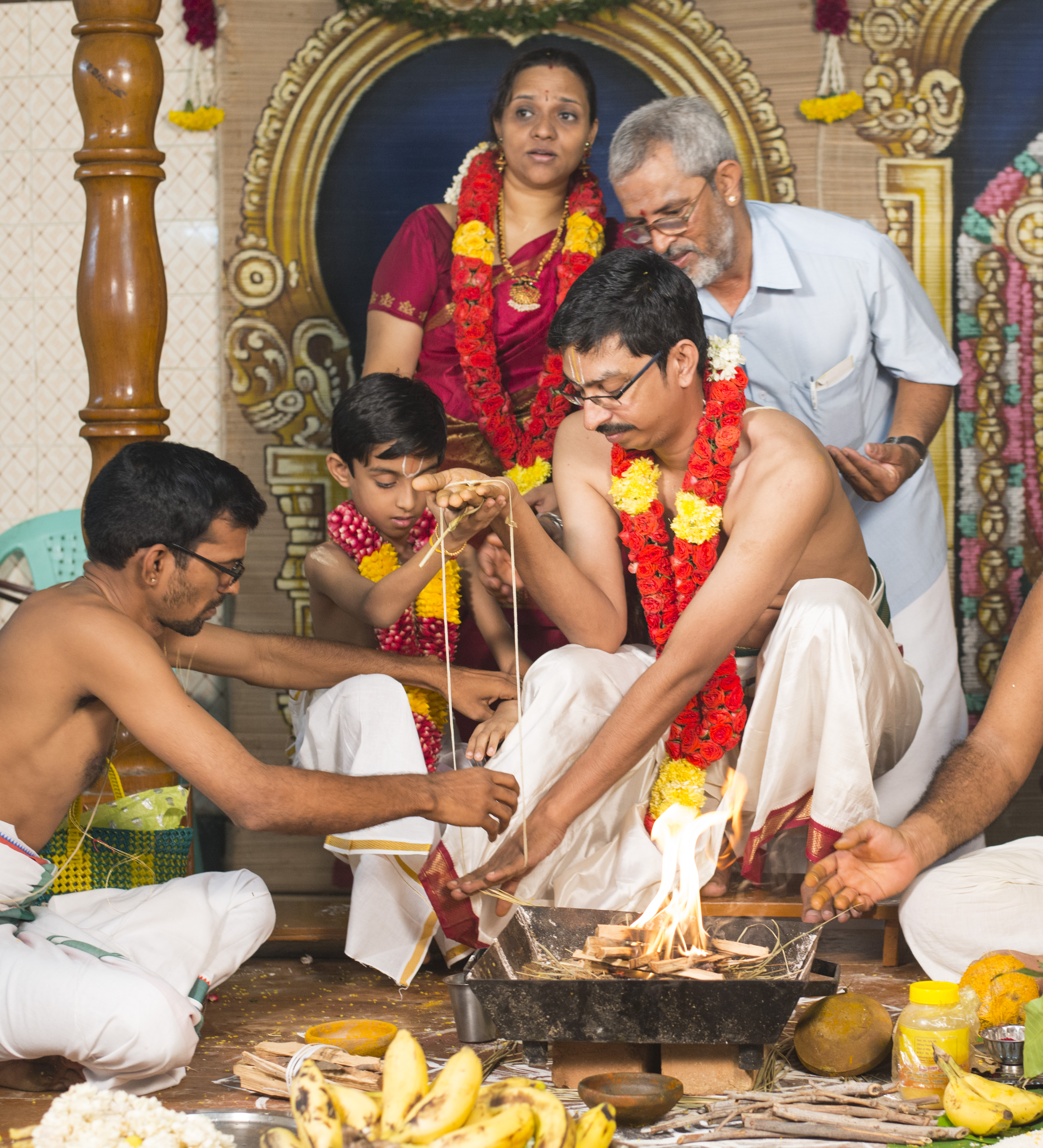
The rite of passage ceremony of an Iyengar boy (Upanayanam)

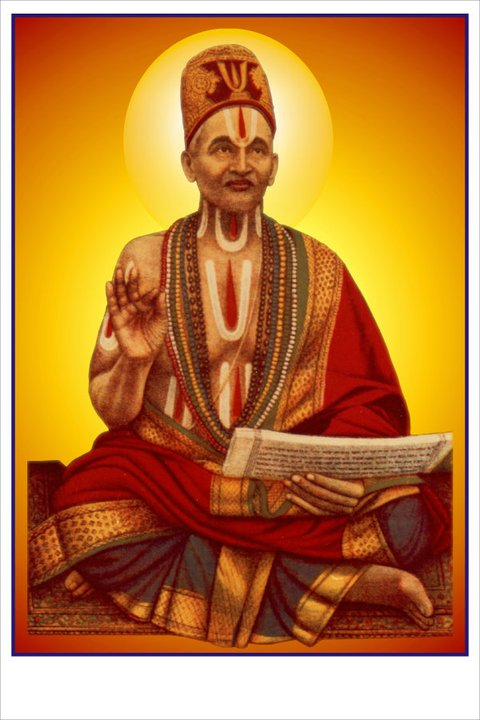
Sri Balmukundacharya in typical Iyengar attire

Tamil Brahmin weddings are held to a distinct standard of religious orthodoxy in comparison to the ceremonies of other communities. They consist of age-old traditions, enactments, time-bound customs, as well as practices for securing kinship affiliations for the sacred initiation of the bride into her new family. These are performed in an elaborate fashion that are intended to secure the blessings of both God and one's ancestors. A typical Iyengar wedding is made up of the following events:

- Vethalaipakku Exchange of gifts between the bride and groom
- Pandalkal Blessing the wedding venue
- Janavasam Heralding the arrival of the groom and inviting him to the mandapam
- Nischayathartham Commitment to be married is made and announced to all
- Jadhaga Naamagaranam Re-naming of bride
- Nandi or Vratham Anointing the bride and groom
- Kashiyathrai The groom embarks on a mock pilgrimage before the father of the bride requests him to come back to the wedding
- Oonjal The couple exchanges garlands and sit on a decorated swing while ladies sing songs
- Piddishuttal The couple is protected from 'dhrishti' evil eye
- Kanyadaanam The father gives away the bride
- Mangalya Dharanam The groom ties the sacred 'thaali' on the bride
- Akshathai The couple is blessed with the showering of coloured rice
- Sesha Homam Lighting of the sacred fire
- Saptapadi The groom and bride take seven steps around the sacred fire
- Nagoli Vasthra The bride' s family welcomes the son-in-law
- Gruhapravesham The bride is welcomed into her marital home
- Sambandhi Virandhu The wedding is followed by a feast for the new families
- Reception Post-wedding celebrations
- Nalangu The bride and groom play games while the guests sing songs

== See also ==
- Iyers
- Tamil Brahmins
- Brahmins
