= Krishnan Raman =

Krishnan Raman (c. 11th century CE) was an officer in the Chola army who served as the Commander-in-chief of the Chola forces under Rajaraja Chola I. He held the title Mummadi Brahmarayar Niyomanam.

== Origin ==
Krishnan Raman was a Vaishnavite Brahmin who joined the Chola Army at an early age.

== Army service ==
Krishnan Raman joined the service of Raja Raja Chola and rose to become an important Senapati or commander. He was given the title Mummadi Brahmarayar Niyomanam. The Leyden Copper plates are an important source of information about him. Krishnan Raman's achievements as an officer won him administrative roles and he was made a Tirumandira Olainayagam, who was the highest officer in the bureaucratic setup.

=== Commander-in-chief ===
Krishnan Raman became the commander-in-chief of the Chola army under Raja Raja's son Rajendra Chola and assumed the traditional title Rajendrasola Brahmarayan. He was succeeded by his son Jananathan who distinguished himself in many of the Chola campaigns. Jananathan was known as the crest jewel of the Cholas.

=== Religious endowments ===
Krishnan Raman is known for the religious endowments he made. He was one of the main donors to the Peruvudaiyar temple at Thanjavur. Inscriptions in the Rajarajeswaram temple indicate that Krishnan Raman constructed the fortifications around the temple. This wall is known as Krishnan Raman Tiruchurrumaligai. This is one of the oldest surviving defensive walls around any Chola temple. A metal image of Ardhanariswara was donated by him in 1014 CE.

== Family ==
Krishnan Raman's son Maraiyan Arumoli, also known as Uttamachola Brahmarayan, also served as Senapathi or army commander in the Chola army. He assisted Rajendra Chola in building a temple for Pidari near Kolar in 1033.
