= Tamil Brahmin =

Ethnoreligious community of Hindu Brahmins

- A Tamil Brahmin wedding ceremony

Regions with significant populations
- Tamil Nadu, Karnataka, Kerala and Andhra Pradesh

Languages
- Tamil, Brahmin Tamil, Sanskrit

Religion
- Hinduism

Tamil Brahmins are an ethnoreligious community of Tamil-speaking Brahmins, predominantly living in Tamil Nadu, though they number significantly in Andhra Pradesh, Karnataka, Kerala and Telangana in addition to other regions of India. They can be broadly divided into two denominations: Iyengars, who are adherents of Sri Vaishnavism, and Iyers, who follow the Srauta and Smarta traditions.

== Denominations ==
Tamil Brahmins are divided into two major denominations: Iyers, who follow the Smarta tradition, and Iyengars, who adhere to the tradition of Sri Vaishnavism.

=== Iyer ===
Iyers are Shrauta-Smarta Brahmins, whose members follow the Advaita philosophy propounded by Adi Shankara. They are concentrated mainly along the Cauvery Delta districts of Nagapattinam, Thanjavur, Tiruvarur and Tiruchirapalli where they form almost 10% of the total population. However the largest population reside in Nagercoil, making up to 13% of the city's population. They are also found in significant numbers in Chennai, Coimbatore, Madurai, Thiruchirappalli, Thanjavur, Palakkad, Alappuzha, Kozhikode, Ernakulam, Kannur, and Thiruvananthapuram.

A minor population of Tamil Brahmins is also found in Sri Lanka, where, although its negligible demography, it formed an influential component of the Sri Lankan Tamil society since the foundation of the Jaffna Kingdom. This community, exclusively composed of the Iyer caste, was mainly strengthened by the more recent settlement of migrants from Southern India, mostly from the second half of the 18th century. This community should not be confused with the Ceylon's Indian Iyers, settled in the southwestern and central parts of the island in the late 19th and 20th centuries.

=== Iyengar ===
The Iyengars subscribe to the Visishtadvaita philosophy propounded by Ramanuja. They are divided into two denominations: Vadakalai (Northern art) and Tenkalai (Southern art), each with minor differences in religious rites and traditions. They adhere to the tradition of Sri Vaishnavism. Temple priests of the Sri Vaishnavite tradition are called Bhattacharyar, Bhattachar, or Bhattar.

== Adi Saiva/Gurukkal and Dikshitar ==
In Tamil-speaking regions of India, two castes of Tamil Brahmins are further found. These communities are specialised into priesthood and ritual accomplishments.

Those who serve as priests in temples following the Shaiva Siddhanta tradition and perform pujas are the Gurukkal, or Ayyan. Peculiarly known as such in the northerly regions of Tamil Nadu, they are also called Bhattar in Pandyanad, the southerly portion of Tamil Nadu. In Kongunad, a territory expanding on the western side of the state, they are named the Adi Saiva (among other spellings Adishaiva, Adi-Shaiva, etc.; from Sanskrit Ādiśaiva, आदिशैव), or the Sivacharya. They follow the Agamas, the Vedas, and are distinguished by their rigorous observation of the Saiva Siddhanta faith and philosophical tradition. While forming an endogamous Tamil Brahmin community on their own, they are offered a distinct category in the demographic surveys conducted by the Government of Tamil Nadu, classified outside the Brahmin community (listed as '713.Brahmanar' (Brahmin)), as '703.Adi Saivar' and '754.Saiva Sivachariyar', in the list of forward castes.

The priests serving the temple of Thillai Natarajar (Shiva) at Chidambaram are known as the Dikshitar, or Potu Dikshitar. They form a distinct and endogamous community, entirely dedicated to conduct worship and rituals in that sanctuary. The Dikshitars are chiefly found in Chidambaram and its surrounding region.

== Notable people ==
- Sage Agastya, Indian sage revered in Hinduism, Tamil Siddhar in the Shaivism tradition, and author of Agattiyam, an early grammar of the Tamil language
- Rukmini Devi Arundale, Indian classical Bharatanatyam dancer, theosophist, choreographer and an animal welfare activist
- Subramania Bharati, Indian independence activist and poet
- Subrahmanyan Chandrasekhar, Nobel Prize-winning Indian astrophysicist
- J. Sai Deepak, Supreme Court lawyer most famous for his representations in the case on the entry of women to Sabarimala Temple
- Muthuswami Dikshitar (1776–1835), poet, singer, veena player, prolific composer of Indian classical music, and the youngest member of the Trinity of Carnatic music.
- Shyamala Gopalan, American-Indian biomedical scientist, mother of U.S. Vice President Kamala Harris
- Alladi Krishnaswamy Iyer, Indian lawyer and member of the Constituent Assembly of India responsible for framing the Constitution of India
- Ramanuja (c. 1077–1157 CE), Indian Hindu philosopher, preacher and a social reformer
- U. V. Swaminatha Iyer, Indian researcher and Tamil scholar
- S. Jaishankar, Indian diplomat and Foreign Minister of India.
- Sanjay Subrahmanyam, Indian-American historian of the early modern period.
- K. Subrahmanyam, Indian international strategic affairs analyst, journalist and civil servant.
- Kachiyapper (8th century), Indian poet and Vedantist and the author of Kanda Puranam
- K. S. Krishnan, Indian physicist, co-discoverer of the Raman scattering
- Krishnan Raman (c. 11th century CE), Senapathi (Commander-in-chief) of the Imperial Chola army of Rajendra Chola I.
- Iravatham Mahadevan, Indian epigraphist and civil servant
- Parithimar Kalaignar (1870–1903), pure Tamil proponent and the first person to campaign for the recognition of Tamil as a classical language.
- Paridhiyaar, medieval Tamil scholar and Kural commentator
- Parimelalhagar, medieval Tamil scholar and Kural commentator
- V. S. Ramachandran, Indian-American neuroscientist specializing in behavioral neurology and known for inventing the mirror box.
- C. V. Raman, Nobel Prize-winning Indian physicist
- Ramana Maharshi (1879–1950)), an Indian Hindu sage.
- Srinivasa Ramanujan, Indian mathematician
- Alladi Ramakrishnan, Indian physicist and founder of the Institute of Mathematical Sciences (Matscience) in Chennai
- Cho Ramaswamy, Indian actor, comedian, editor, journalist, political commentator, satirist, playwright, film director and lawyer.
- Vivek Ramaswamy, American politician and candidate 2024 Republican Party presidential primaries
- Sivananda Saraswati, Indian yoga guru, Hindu spiritual teacher, and proponent of Vedanta
- C. S. Seshadri, Indian mathematician
- T.N.Seshan, Chief Election Commissioner
- Nirmala Sitharaman, Finance Minister of India (2019–present), former Defence Minister of India
- S. R. Srinivasa Varadhan, Indian mathematician and Abel Prize laureate
- Ramaswamy Venkataraman, Indian lawyer, independence activist and politician, who served as the eighth president of India

== See also ==
- Caste system in India
- Gotra
- Vedic priesthood
- List of Brahmins
- List of Iyengars
