= Mylapore clique =

Influential faction in the Madras Presidency

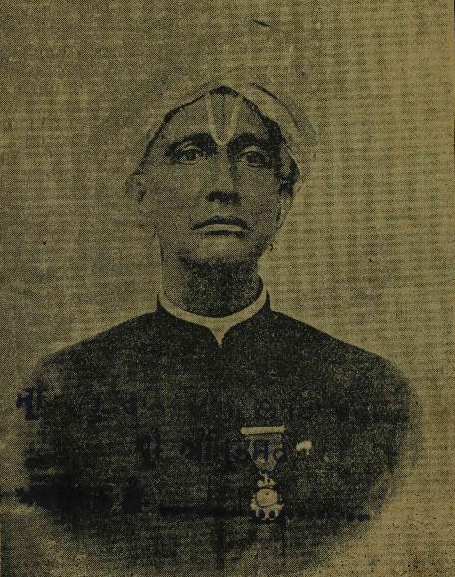
Dewan Bahadur Sir V. Bhashyam Aiyangar CIE

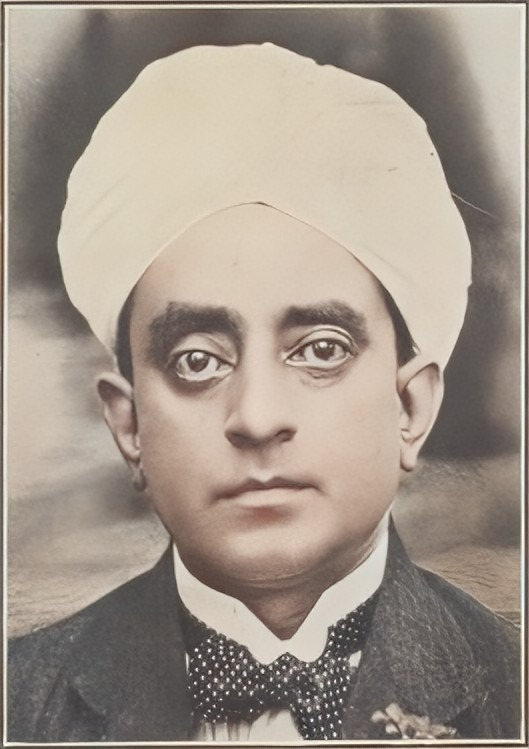
Dewan Bahadur Sachivottama Sir C. P. Ramaswami Iyer KCSI KCIE

The Mylapore clique (also termed an oligarchy, faction, group, set, and cabal) was a small group of politically moderate and elite Brahmins (primarily Tamil Brahmins), — many of whom were noted lawyers, administrators, academics or educators, and industrialists — in the Madras Presidency. The clique is considered to have "wielded almost exclusive influence and patronage in the service and government appointments", and "controlled the flow of resources out of the institutions of the capital", and "dominated the professional and political life of [the presidency]."

== Overview ==
Informal and exclusive, the clique was controlled by two extended families, the Vembaukum Iyengars, and the Calamur Viravalli-Chetpet Iyers, and took its name from the luxurious Madras City neighborhood in which many of its members kept mansions. The clique formed and began to exert influence during the 1880s and 1890s under the headship of Sir V. Bhashyam Aiyangar and Sir S. Subramania Iyer, with R. Raghunatha Rao as a tertiary leader. Some argue that the clique reached its zenith between 1910 and 1920, while others highlight its influence in ministry and magistracy continuing into the 1920s and 1930s, with Sir C. P. Ramaswami Iyer as leader.

American historian Eugene F. Irschick said of them, "the Mylapore Clique was most powerful in the High Court and the Judiciary, but its great influence permeated the Secretariat at Fort St. George and all the Tamil District administrations. It was not without its ramifications in the more important Telugu Districts — Guntur, Kistna, Godavaris, Vizag, and Bellary.' Affiliates and relatives of senior members - especially those related to the two dominant families - ascended the bureaucracy, magistracy, and business communities, under a government which had come to operate appointments using "the celebrated principle of the best-backed" candidates. One beneficiary was Srinivasa Ramanujan, initially funded by clique member R. Ramachandra Rao, then Collector of Nellore and President of the Indian Mathematical Society, who obtained for him a well-salaried accounting clerkship in the Madras Port Trust, which was succeeded by a special scholarship at the University of Madras secured by the advocacy of university vice-chancellor, Justice of the High Court, and clique leader P. R. Sundaram Iyer. (Note: On his return from England, sickened with tuberculosis, Ramanujan was treated by the medical specialist P. S. Chandrasekhara Iyer, brother of clique leader Sir P. S. Sivaswami Iyer.)

Senior members routinely served as judges and justices of the High Court of Madras, as Tehsildars and district magistrates, as Ministers of the Executive Council of the Governor of Madras and the Legislative Council of Madras, in Madras Corporation, and in similar offices; in parallel, they were often honoured by the British as Companions or Knights Commander of the Order of the British Empire or of the Order of the Star of India, and/or as Knights Bachelor, with the Kaisar-i-Hind Medal, (Note: Justice V. Krishnaswamy Iyer; Dewan Bahadur Justice C.V. Viswanatha Sastri) as well as with the titles of Rai or Rao Bahadur, and of Dewan Bahadur. Members were mainstays as high as the Viceroy's Executive Council, governing all British India as it sat under the purview of their ministerial portfolios, (Note: e.g. Sir C.P. Ramaswami Iyer, Sir P.S. Sivaswamy Iyer) and sat even on the Privy Council of the United Kingdom (Note: V.S. Srinivasa Sastri, also created a Companion of Honour) and as India's delegates to the League of Nations, the Round Table Conferences, and the London Economic Conference of 1933. (Note: Sir C.P. Ramaswami Iyer, Sir P.S. Sivaswami Iyer)

The Mylapore clique and its ur-elements were of central importance in the Madras Mahajana Sabha, forerunner of the Indian National Congress, which it dominated without resistance in the southern territories until 1905, rendering it nearly 'moribund'. Annie Besant developed close ties to the Mylapore set resulting in the exploration of Theosophy by many Mylapore elites, and, after 1910, the metamorphosis of the set's regional machines, via Theosophical Society branches into tools of nationalist mobilization, eventually resulting in India's Home Rule Movement. Beyond conventional politics, the Mylapore clique was also active in long-running attempts to reform of the Madras Presidency's 75,000 Hindu temples as the Dharmarakshana Sabha, against which British colonial administrators, increasingly wary, effectively waged a proxy war in the 1910s, although the Sabha succeeded in obtaining its selectees' appointments to the administration of the richest of the presidency's temples through the courts.

Opposition came at first, haphazardly, from Triplicane Six ringleader and editor-in-chief of the Hindu, G. Subramania Iyer, who was sidelined after the 1880s, and consequently from Sir C. Sankaran Nair's 'less well-placed' Egmore clique, backed by S. Kasturi Ranga Iyengar, who in 1905 purchased control of The Hindu; later, from, the Justice Party; the Self-Respect Movement and Non-Brahmin movement, today known as the Dravidian movement are viewed by scholars as a reaction to and against Mylapore hegemony, while the Mylapore-Egmore rivalry proved crucial to the formation of the mature Indian National Congress. Along with the neutral (though Brahminical) Triplicane Clique of Ramarao and M. O. Parthasarathy Iyengar, Mylapore and Egmore were often referred to as Madras' 'Three Inns of Court', paralleling London's Gray's Inn, Lincoln's Inn, and Middle Temple. During the Home Rule movement, Mylapore and Egmore were briefly allied, although this failed to last. The nationalists of the Salem Clique led by Rajaji wrestled with the Mylapore faction for control over the provincial congress and eventually succeeded with the Gandhian line of engagement.

== Senior members ==
- Dewan Bahadur Sir V. Bhashyam Aiyangar CIE †
- Dewan Bahadur Sir S. Subramania Iyer KCIE †
- Dewan Bahadur Rai Raghunatha Rao CIE
- Justice V. Krishnaswamy Iyer CSI Kaisar-i-Hind †
- Sir P. S. Sivaswami Iyer KCSI CIE
- Dewan Bahadur Chief Justice Sir C. V. Kumaraswami Sastri
- Dewan Bahadur Justice C.V. Viswanatha Sastri, Kaisar-i-Hind
- Sir V. C. Desikachariar
- V. S. Srinivasa Sastri CH PC
- Dewan Bahadur Sachivottama Sir C. P. Ramaswami Iyer KCSI KCIE †
- S. Srinivasa Iyengar CIE
- Dewan Bahadur Justice L. A. Govindaraghava Aiyar
- G. A. Natesan
- Justice P. R. Sundaram Iyer
- Judge C. R. Pattabhirama Iyer
- Dewan Bahadur R. Ramachandra Rao

(† denotes a generational leader)

== Allies or subordinate members ==
- Dewan Bahadur Sir Mocharla Ramachandra Rao Pantulu Garu Kaisar-i-Hind
- Konda Venkatappayya
- N. Subba Rao Pantulu
- Kandukuri Veeresalingam Pantulu

== See also ==
- Category:Mylapore clique
