= Egmore clique =

The Egmore group, also faction, clique, or set, was a faction in the Madras Presidency which emerged as opposition to the hegemony of the Mylapore clique, crystallizing around the leadership of C. Sankaran Nair — one of the first non-Brahmins to achieve high office in British India. S. Kasturi Ranga Iyengar, editor-owner of The Hindu, was another crucial early ‘Egmorean’, as was C. Rajagopalachari, who ultimately ousted the Egmore group from the position of power it had achieved in the Madras Presidency wing of Indian National Congress, the origins of which substantially lie in the Mylapore-Egmore rivalry. Additional pivotal figures in the early Egmore faction were T. Rangachari, C. Vijayaraghavachariar, and T. M. Nair. Along with the neutral (though Brahminical) Triplicane Clique of Ramarao and M. O. Parthasarathy Iyengar, Mylapore and Egmore were often referred to as Madras' 'Three Inns of Court', paralleling London's Gray's Inn, Lincoln's Inn, and Middle Temple. During the Home Rule movement, Mylapore and Egmore were briefly allied, although this failed to last. The nationalists of the Salem Clique led by Rajaji wrestled with the Mylapore faction for control over the provincial congress and eventually succeeded with the Gandhian line of engagement.

== Members ==
- C. Sankaran Nair
- S. Kasturi Ranga Iyengar
- Rairu Nambiar
- A. Rangaswami Iyengar
- C. Vijayaraghavachariar
- T. M. Nair
- T. Rangachari
