= C. R. Pattabhirama Iyer =

Indian lawyer and jurist

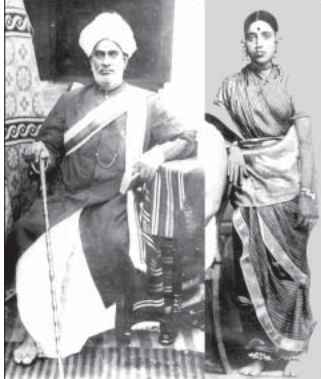
C.R. Pattabhirama Aiyar with wife Rangammal

Chetput Ramaswami Pattabhirama Iyer (c. 1857 – September 29, 1902), surname alternately spelt Aiyar, originally surnamed Dikshitar, was an Indian lawyer and jurist, noted for having led the Tanjore Bar and served as the Tanjore public prosecutor, before relocating to the city of Madras, whereupon he ultimately became a Vakil of the High Court of Madras, central member of the Mylapore clique, and a leader of the Madras bar, along with M. O. Parthasarathy Iyengar, V. Krishnaswamy Iyer, P. R. Sundaram Iyer, Sir V. C. Desikachariar, and Sir C. Sankaran Nair, immediately behind Sir V. Bhashyam Aiyangar and Sir S. Subramania Iyer, from 1891.

He was appointed to the Madras City Civil Court as a judge in 1899, serving also on the Court of Small Causes, preparatory for higher judicial office, but died three years later, at the age of 45.

He fostered his only son, Sir C. P. Ramaswami Iyer, in the family of C. V. Runganada Sastri, betrothing him to C. V. Sundara Sastri's daughter Seethamma, and apprenticing him to Sundara Sastri's son Sir C. V. Kumaraswami Sastri, thus completing a merger of two powerful North Arcot Vadama dynasties.
