= The Kuppuswami Sastri Research Institute =

Non Profit Organization

- Formation: 1945
- Type: Non-profit organization
- Headquarters: 84, Thiru Vi. Ka. Road, Mylapore, Chennai - 600 004
- Location: Chennai, Tamil Nadu, India
- Region served: India
- Fields: Education, Seminars, Library
- President: R. K. Raghavan

The Kuppuswami Sastri Research Institute is a library and research centre in Indology and the Sanskrit language based in the city of Chennai, India. Founded in memory of Sanskrit scholar Mahamahopadhyaya S. Kuppuswami Sastri, the institute was inaugurated in 1945. The institute has a library of about 60,000 volumes and manuscripts and offers M.Phil. and PhD programmes in association with the University of Madras.

== History ==
Upon the death of reputed Sanskrit scholar and Indologist Mahamahopadhyay S. Kuppuswami Sastri, some of his friends and admirers gathered to set up The Kuppuswami Sastri Research Institute in March 1944. The institute was registered on February 24, 1945, and formally inaugurated by S. V. Ramamurthy, advisor to the Madras provincial government on April 22, 1945. The committee members included S. Radhakrishnan, S. Vaiyapuri Pillai, V. Krishnaswami Iyer's sons K. Balasubramania Aiyer and K. Chandrasekharan and Sir Arcot Lakshmanaswami Mudaliar. The institute and its library were housed within the precincts of the Madras Sanskrit College with which the institute has been closely associated.

Since 1982, the institute has been offering M.Phil. and PhD programmes in Sanskrit in association with the University of Madras. The institute also conducts examinations for the Vidyavaridhi title in association with the Rashtriya Sanskrit Sansthan, New Delhi.

== Activities ==
The institute conducts masters and PhD programmes and conducts regular seminars and talks on Indology-related subjects. It also publishes books in Sanskrit, English and Tamil. The institute publishes publishes the annual Journal of Oriental Research which was started by S. Kuppuswami Sastri in 1927.

== Library ==
The institute has a library of around 60,000 published works and palm leaf manuscripts in Sanskrit, Tamil and English.

== List of Presidents ==
- V. S. Srinivasa Sastri (1944–1946)
- T. R. Venkatarama Sastri (1946–1953)
- S. Radhakrishnan (1953–1975)
- T. V. Viswanatha Iyer (1975–1981)
- C. Sivaramamurti (1981–1983)
- N. Mahalingam (1983–2015)
- T. S. Krishnamurthy (2015–2020)
- R. K. Raghavan (2020–till date)

== See also ==
- Madras Sanskrit College
- Government Oriental Manuscripts Library and Research Centre
