= Chettur Nair =

Chettur Nair may refer to:

- Chettur Madhavan Nair (1879–1970), Indian judge
- Chettur Sankaran Nair (1857–1934), Indian judge and uncle of the above; involved in the O'Dwyer v. Nair libel case (1924)
