= Kuppuswamy =

Kuppuswamy or Kuppuswami is a name. People with the name include:

- Kuppuswamy Nagarajan
- Kuppuswamy Kalyanasundaram
- C. K. Kuppuswamy
- K. Kuppuswamy
- C. Kuppuswamy
- G. Kuppuswami Naidu
- Sadhu Kuppuswami
- S. Kuppuswami Sastri
- Kuppuswami Naidu Veeraswami
- Nalli Kuppuswami Chetti
- Kuppuswami Sampath

== See also ==
- Jagarlamudi Kuppuswamy Chowdary College
- The Kuppuswami Sastri Research Institute
