= S. Kuppuswami Sastri =

Mahamahopadhyaya S. Kuppuswami Sastri
- Born: 12 December 1880; Ganapathi Agraharam, Tanjore district, British India (now in Thanjavur District, Tamil Nadu, India)
- Died: 5 September 1943 (aged 62); Madras, British India (now Chennai, India)
- Occupations: Sanskrit scholar, professor, librarian and archive curator

Mahamahopadhyaya S. Kuppuswami Sastri (12 December 1880 - 5 September 1943) was an Indologist, Sanskrit scholar, academic and librarian who served as professor of Sanskrit and Classical Philology at the Presidency College, Madras and curator of the Government Oriental Manuscripts Library and Research Centre from 1914 to 1935. He was also the first Principal of the Madras Sanskrit College. The Kuppuswami Sastri Research Institute was established in his memory.

== Early life and education ==
Kuppuswami Sastri was born on 12 December 1880 in the village of Ganapathi Agraharam in Tanjore district in a family of Sanskrit scholars. As a child Kuppuswami Sastri studied Vedanta, Nyaya and Mimamsa from the Sanskrit scholar Brahmendra Sarasvati and Vyakarana from Nilakanta Sastrigal and English as part of his formal western education.

Kuppuswami Sastri completed his graduation from the S. P. G. College in Thanjavur in 1900 and completed his M. A. in Sanskrit from the University of Madras in 1905.

== Career ==
Kuppuswami Sastri was appointed Principal of the newly established Madras Sanskrit College in 1906. He headed Madras Sanskrit College till 1910 when he took over as Principal of the Rajah's College, Tiruvadi serving till 1914.

In 1914, Kuppuswami Sastri was appointed Professor of Sanskrit and Classical Philology at the Presidency College, Madras. In this role, he also had the responsibility of the curatorship of the Government Oriental Manuscripts Library and Research Centre which was acclaimed for its vast collection of manuscripts in Sanskrit, Tamil and other Dravidian languages. As curator, he edited the library's official bulletin and brought out indexes and catalogs to the vast collection. Kuppuswami Sastri was also elected to the Senate of the University of Madras during this period.

In 1927, Kuppuswami Sastri founded the Journal of Oriental Research, an independent indological journal whose publication was later assumed by The Kuppuswami Sastri Research Institute. He also founded the Samskrta Academy to promote research in Sanskrit.

Kuppuswami Sastri retired on 15 December 1935 and was appointed Honorary Professor of Sanskrit at the Annamalai University in Chidambaram.

== Death ==
Kuppuswami Sastri died on 5 September 1943 at the age of sixty two. In his memory, The Kuppuswami Sastri Research Institute was established in March 1944 and it started functioning from 22 April 1945.

== Honours ==
Kuppuswami Sastri was accorded the title Vidyavacaspati by the Bharat Dharma Mahamandal of Varanasi in 1926. In 1932, he was given the title Darsanakalanidhi by the Paramacharya of Kanchi mutt followed by the title of Kulapati by the Shankaracharya of Govardhan Mutt, Puri in 1933. In 1927, Kuppuswami Sastri was accorded the honorific Mahamahopadhyaya by the Government of India.
