= M. O. Parthasarathy Iyengar =

Indian lawyer and magistrate

Diwan Bahadur Mandayam Osuri Parthasarathi Iyengar, M.A., M.L. (1857–1926) was an Indian lawyer and magistrate who retired to private practice in 1913, from the role of District and Sessions Judge of Rajahmundry in the Madras Presidency, having served prior as Chief Judge and Third Judge of the Court of Small Causes, and as a judge of the Madras City Civil Court. He was born in 1857, and after graduating with a Bachelor of Laws in 1879 apprenticed with T. Rama Rao, before enrolling as a Vakil of the High Court of Madras. He subsequently graduated to the rank of Advocate, and was recognized as one of the leaders of the Appellate Side, along with C. R. Pattabhirama Iyer, V. Krishnaswamy Iyer, P. R. Sundaram Iyer, Sir V. C. Desikachariar, and Sir C. Sankaran Nair, immediately behind Sir V. Bhashyam Aiyangar and Sir S. Subramania Iyer, from 1891, prior to embarking on his judicial career in 1896. He was a member of the Madras Law College Council, and reportedly led the Triplicane Clique. He was uncle to M. O. P. Iyengar and M. O. T. Iyengar.
