= C. Sankaran Nair =

Indian politician (1857–1934)

Sir Chettur Sankaran Nair CIE
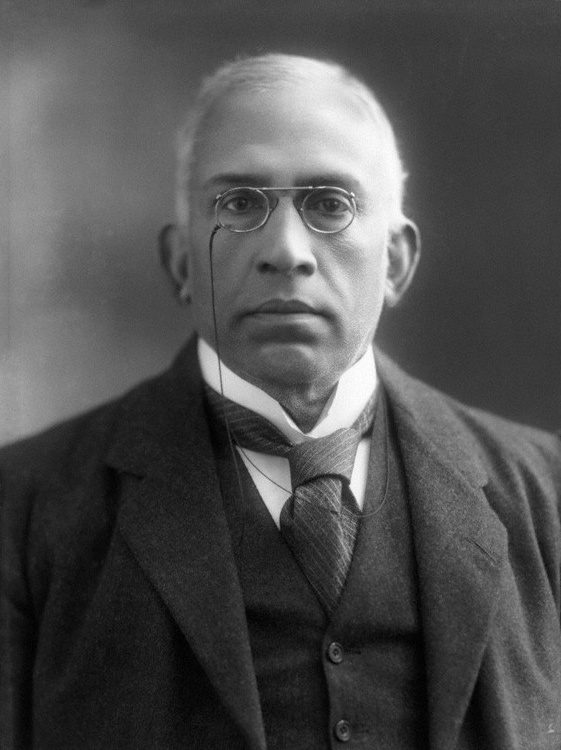

Justice of the High Court of Madras
- In office 1908 – 1915

Advocate-General of Madras
- In office 1906–1908
- Preceded by: C. A. White
- Succeeded by: Sir P. S. Sivaswami Iyer

President of the Indian National Congress
- In office 1897 – 1897
- Preceded by: Rahimtulla M. Sayani
- Succeeded by: Anandamohan Bose

Personal details
- Born: 11 July 1857 Ottapalam, Walluvanad Taluk, Malabar District, Madras Presidency, British India (present day Ottapalam, Palakkad, Kerala, India)
- Died: 24 April 1934 (aged 76) Madras, Madras Presidency, British India (now Chennai, Tamil Nadu, India)
- Party: Indian National Congress
- Profession: Lawyer; Jurist; Activist; Politician

Sir Chettur Sankaran Nair CIE (11 July 1857 – 24 April 1934) was an Indian lawyer, judge and statesman who served as the Advocate-General of Madras from 1906 to 1910, on the High Court of Madras as a puisne justice from 1910 to 1915, and as India-wide Education minister as a member of the Viceroy's Executive Council from 1915 until 1919. He was elected president of the 1897 Indian National Congress, and led the Egmore faction, opposing the Mylapore group.

According to V. C. Gopalratnam, he was a leader of the Madras bar, alongside C. R. Pattabhirama Iyer, M. O. Parthasarathy Iyengar, V. Krishnaswamy Iyer, P. R. Sundaram Iyer, and Sir V. C. Desikachariar, and immediately behind Sir V. Bhashyam Aiyangar and Sir S. Subramania Iyer. He wrote Gandhi and Anarchy (1922).

== Early life and education ==
Chettur Sankaran Nair was born in the British Raj on 11 July 1857 as the son of Parvathy Amma of Chettur family and Mammayil Ramunni Panicker of the Mammayil family, in Guruvayur, Thrissur district. Through matrilineal succession, Sankaran Nair belongs to a prominent family named Chettur.

His father worked as a Tahsildar under the British government. His early education began in the traditional style at home and continued in schools in Malabar, till he passed the arts examination with a first class from the Provincial School at Kozhikode. Then he joined the Presidency College, Madras. In 1877 he took his arts degree, and two years later secured the law degree from the Madras Law College.

== Career ==
Nair started as a lawyer in 1880 in the High Court of Madras. In 1884, the Madras Government appointed him as a member of the committee for an enquiry into the district of Malabar. Till 1908, he was the Advocate-General to the Government and an Acting Judge from time to time. In 1908, he became a permanent Judge in the High Court of Madras and held the post till 1915. He was a part of the bench that tried Collector Ashe murder case along with C. A. White, then the Chief Justice of Madras, William Ayling, as a special case. In his best-known judgment, he upheld conversion to Hinduism and ruled that such converts were not outcasts. He founded and edited the Madras Review and the Madras Law Journal.

In the meantime, in 1902, the Viceroy Lord Curzon appointed him Secretary to the Raleigh University Commission. In recognition of his services, he was appointed a Companion of the Indian Empire by the King-Emperor in 1904 and in 1912 he was knighted. He became a member of the Viceroy's Council in 1915 with the charge of the Education portfolio. As member, he wrote in 1919 two Minutes of Dissent in the Despatches on Indian Constitutional Reforms, pointing out the various defects of British rule in India and suggesting reforms. The British government accepted most of his recommendations.

== Jallianwalla Bagh massacre and Libel Trial ==
The Jallianwala Bagh massacre also known as the Amritsar massacre, took place on 13 April 1919. A large crowd had gathered at the Jallianwala Bagh in Amritsar, Punjab, British India, during the annual Baisakhi fair to peaceful protest against the Rowlatt Act and the arrest of pro-Indian independence activists Saifuddin Kitchlew and Satyapal. In response to the public gathering, the temporary brigadier general R. E. H. Dyer surrounded the people with his Gurkha and Sikh infantry regiments of the British Indian Army. The Jallianwala Bagh could only be exited on one side, as its other three sides were enclosed by buildings. After blocking the exit with his troops, Dyer ordered them to shoot at the crowd, continuing to fire even as the protestors tried to flee. The troops kept on firing until their ammunition was low and they were ordered to stop. Estimates of those killed vary from 379 to 1,500 or more people; over 1,200 others were injured, of whom 192 sustained serious injury.

Nair resigned from the Viceroy's Council in the aftermath of Jallianwalla Bagh massacre on 13 April 1919. Nair then communicated to the editor of The Westminster Gazette which soon published an article called 'the Amritsar Massacre'. Other papers including The Times also followed suit.

In his 1922 anti-Mahatma Gandhi invective tract 'Gandhi and Anarchy', Nair wrote about following the events in Punjab with increasing concern. The shooting at Jallianwala Bagh was part of a larger crackdown in the province, where martial law had been introduced - the region was cut off from the rest of the country and no newspapers were allowed into it.

"If to govern the country, it is necessary that innocent persons should be slaughtered at Jallianwala Bagh and that any Civilian Officer may, at any time, call in the military and the two together may butcher the people as at Jallianwala Bagh, the country is not worth living in" - C. Sankaran Nair

The book also condemned Sir Michael O'Dwyer, the Lieutenant Governor of Punjab for his role in the massacre, prompting a libel suit against Nair in 1924. Nair accused O'Dwyer of terrorism, holding him responsible for the atrocities committed by the civil government before the imposition of martial law.

Reports of the depositions in the hearing were published daily in The Times. Nair's family says despite losing, the case achieved his purpose of having the atrocities brought to public attention. Nair's great-grandson Raghu Palat, who co-wrote the book The Case That Shook The Empire, with his wife Pushpa, says the case helped spark "an uproar for the freedom movement".

After a five-week trial in the Court of King's Bench in London ruled 11:1 in favour of O'Dwyer, awarding damages of £500 and £7,000 in costs to him. O'Dwyer offered to forgo this for an apology but Nair refused and paid instead. Afterward Nair became a councillor to the secretary of state for India (in London, 1920–21) and a member of the Indian Council of State (from 1925).

He played an active part in the Indian National movement which was gathering force in those days. In 1897, when the First Provincial Conference met in Madras, he was invited to preside over it. The same year, when the Indian National Congress assembled at Amravati, he was chosen its president. In a masterly address, he referred to the highhandedness of foreign administration, called for reforms and asked for self-government for India with Dominion Status. In 1900, he was a member of the Madras Legislative Council. His official life from 1908 to 1921 interrupted his activities as a free political worker. In 1928, he was the President of the Indian Central Committee to co-operate with the Simon Commission. The Committee prepared a well-argued report asking for Dominion Status for India. When the Viceregal announcement came granting Dominion Status as the ultimate goal for India, Sir Sankaran Nair retired from active politics. He died in 1934, aged 77.

== Family ==
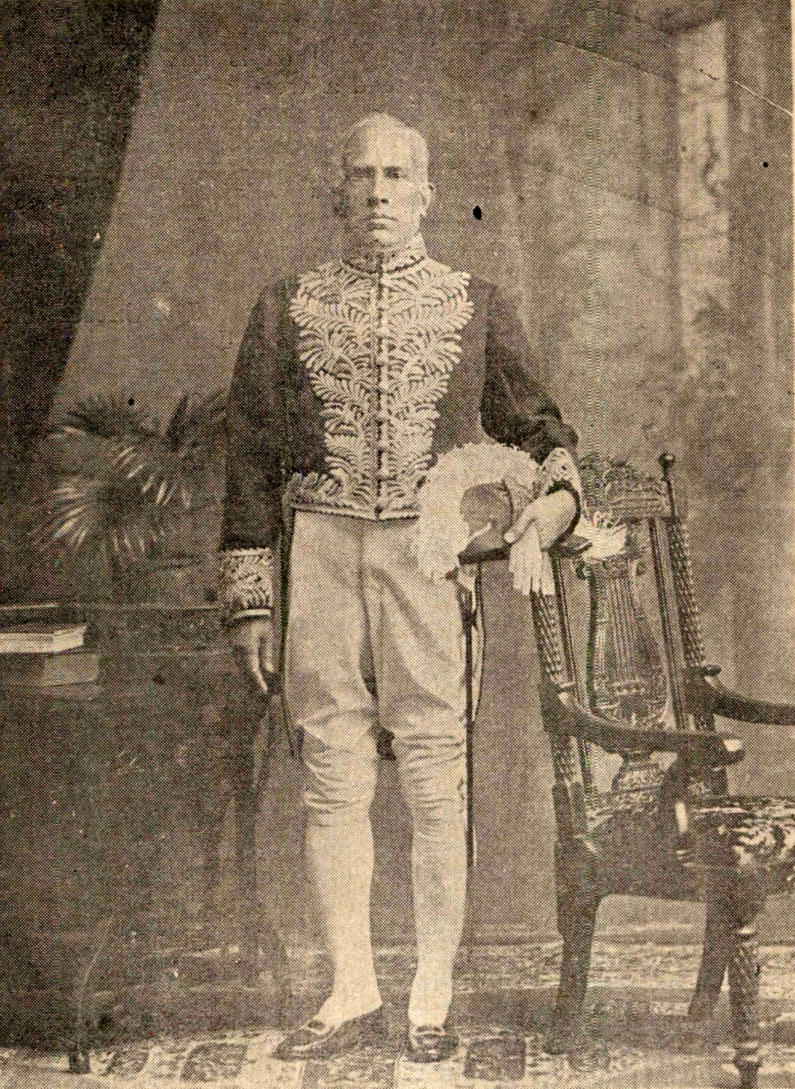
Nair as an Executive councillor in 1919.

Sankaran Nair was married to Palat Kunhimalu Amma or Parvati Amma, at a young age according to the traditions of matrilineal lineage of Nayar aristocracy of the time. She predeceased him in 1926 during a pilgrimage to the holy temple of Badrinath in present-day Uttarakhand. The couple had six children.

- Their eldest daughter Parvathi Amma (later Lady Madhavan Nair) married her cousin Sir C. Madhavan Nair, a legal luminary and a judge of the Privy Council. They lived on a large estate known as Lynwood, in Chennai. Within this property, in the area now known as Lady Madhavan Nair colony/Mahalinagapuram, is situated near the Ayappan-Guruvayoorappan temple, the land for which was donated by Lady Madhavan Nair. There are still many roads bearing names of the house – Lynwood avenue – and of the children of Sir and Lady Nair – Palat Narayani Amma road, Palat Sankaran Nair road, Palat Madhavan Nair road.
- Saraswathy Amma, a.k.a. Anuji, the youngest daughter, was married to the eminent diplomat K. P. S. Menon. Their son, K. P. S. Menon Jr., and grandson Shivshankar Menon were also diplomats who served as Foreign Secretary. Shivshankar Menon also served as India's 4th National Security Advisor.
- Their only son, R. M. Palat was also a noted politician in his own right.
- A daughter was married to M. A. Candeth. Their son, Lt. Gen. Kunhiraman Palat Candeth was the Western Army Commander during the Indo-Pak War of 1971 and the liberator of Goa. Candeth's nephew and Sir Sankaran Nair's great-great-grandson, Anil Menon, is a NASA astronaut.
- Another daughter was married to M. Govindan Nair.
- Another daughter was married to T. K. Menon.

Sankaran Nair's grand-nephew, V. M. M. Nair, was the oldest surviving ICS Officer in India when he died in 2021. His grand-nephew (niece Ammukutty Amma's son) was K. K. Chettur, an ICS officer who also served as India's first ambassador to Japan. He was the father of Jaya Jaitly, a politician and socialist, whose husband Ashok Jaitly was chief secretary of Jammu and Kashmir. Jaya's daughter Aditi is married to the former cricketer Ajay Jadeja.

Another grand-nephew of Sankaran Nair's was P. P. Narayanan (son of Chettur Narayanan Nair), a distinguished world trade unionist and leader in Malaysia (Morais 1984, introductory pages).

== Popular Culture ==
A movie involving Sankaran Nair was officially announced in January 2025 by Dharma Productions and began production in December 2023, starring Akshay Kumar as Sir Sankaran Nair, and other cast members include R. Madhavan as McKinney and Ananya Panday as Dilreet Gill. The film titled as Kesari Chapter 2, was released on 18 April 2025 to positive reviews. The film was also based on the events of Jallianwala Bagh Massacre.

== Bibliography ==
- Gandhi and Anarchy (1922). Archive.org. Retrieved on 2012-06-11.
