= V. M. M. Nair =

Indian civil servant and diplomat (1919–2021)

Personal details
- Born: Vallilath Madhathil Madhavan Nair; 8 October 1919 Mangalore, Madras Presidency, British Raj (present-day Karnataka, India)
- Died: 6 October 2021 (aged 101) Mayur Vihar Phase I, Delhi, India
- Spouse: Krishnakumari Nair
- Children: 2
- Education: Christian College School (University of Madras); Brasenose College, Oxford; Gonville and Caius College, Cambridge
- Website: Official website

Vallilath Madhathil Madhavan Nair (8 October 1919 – 6 October 2021) was an Indian civil servant and diplomat. He was the last living former officer of both the Indian Civil Service and the Indian Political Service.

== Background and family ==
Nair was born into a distinguished family of civil servants and lawyers; his father Chettur Karunakaran Nair was an Indian Imperial Police officer who served as a district superintendent in the Madras Presidency. Madhavan Nair got his family name, Vallilath Madhathil, through matrilineal succession.

His uncle Sir C. Madhavan Nair was a judge of the Madras High Court who served as Advocate-General of Madras from 1923 to 1924, while his great-uncle Sir C. Sankaran Nair was President of the Indian National Congress in 1897 and Advocate-General of Madras from 1906 to 1908. He was married to Krishnakumari Nair and has two children, a son and a daughter. After his retirement, he resided in New Delhi.

== Education and early career ==
He was educated at Brasenose College, Oxford and at Gonville and Caius College, Cambridge. In July 1942, he was selected for the second-to-last batch of the Indian Civil Service, both the smallest-ever batch of the ICS and the last for which direct nominations were made by the India Office in London. He was subsequently posted to Bihar Province as an assistant collector and magistrate. In 1946, he transferred to the Foreign and Political Department (the Indian Political Service).

=== Tibet initiative ===
As a deputy secretary, Nair and his colleagues in the Department of External Affairs were involved in a British initiative to supply arms to Tibet. With Indian independence imminent, the British government determined to maintain a certain level of influence in the largely autonomous state and gain some leverage over the Chinese government, even to the extent of arming "peace-loving monks". In February 1946, British political agents encouraged Tibet to purchase 382,162 rupees (£28,662. 3s. 0d.; equivalent to £1,037,871 in 2025). worth of weapons. The suggested purchases, intended to equip a brigade-level force, included 2- and 3-inch mortars, Bren and Sten guns, rifles and Verey pistols. Though this shipment was delivered to Lhasa in May 1947, some difficulties remained over approvals for ammunition. On 5 August 1947, Nair observed any disturbances in Tibet would have geopolitical consequences in areas bordering both India and Pakistan. He suggested both governments send Tibet ammunition from their joint supply ahead of partition. This was done, and the ammunition arrived in Tibet in January 1948.

== Later career ==
After Indian independence, Nair transferred to the newly organised Indian Foreign Service and was promoted to senior under-secretary by 1949. He was then posted to the Cairo embassy as first secretary, where he was appointed acting charge d'affaires on 19 April 1951.

Over the course of his career, Nair held the following appointments:

- Deputy Secretary, Ministry of External Affairs (24 August 1953)
- Deputy High Commissioner of India to Ceylon (12 August 1955)
- Acting High Commissioner of India to Ceylon (6 October 1956 to 8 April 1957)
- Commissioner of India to Singapore and the Federation of Malaya (2 May 1957)
- High Commissioner of India to the Federation of Malaya and Commissioner of India to Singapore (12 September 1957 to 20 June 1958)
- Ambassador of India to Cambodia (relinquished 3 August 1960)
- Ambassador of India to Norway (10 December 1960)
- Ambassador of India to Poland (24 June 1967)
- Ambassador of India to Morocco and accredited to Tunisia (15 January 1971)
- Ambassador of India to Spain (13 February 1975)

== Death ==
Nair died on 6 October 2021 at the age of 101 in his flat in Mayur Vihar Phase I, two days before his 102nd birthday.
