= T. Gopala Rao =

Thandalam Gopala Rao
- A portrait of T. Gopala Rao
- Born: 1832; Ganapathi Agraharam, Tanjore district, Madras Presidency, British India
- Died: 11 May 1886 (aged 53–54); Madras, British India
- Known for: educationist

Rai Bahadur Thandalam Gopala Rao (Marathi: तंडलं गोपाळ राव, Tamil: தண்டலம் கோபால் ராவ்) (c. 1832 – 11 May 1886) was an Indian educator who, along with William Archer Porter, was responsible for the growth of the Government Arts College, Kumbakonam in its early stages.

== Early life ==
Gopala Rao was born in a Thanjavur Marathi family in the village of Ganapathi Agraharam near Kumbakonam. His grandfather Thandalam Jeevanna (also known as Ramachandra Pandit) had worked as a Tahsildar in the service of the British East India Company, while his father Raghava Punt served as a revenue officer under Serfoji II.

During Rao's infancy, the family moved to Tiruvadi and from there to Travancore where Gopala Rao served in the Travancore service. Gopala Rao had little schooling but achieved proficiency in Marathi, Sanskrit and English. At the age of 17, Gopala Rao was employed as a clerk in the office of the collector of Tanjore. In 1851, he was promoted Manager of the Department of Public Works.

== Educational career ==
In 1854, Gopala Rao entered the educational department as First Assistant in the newly established provincial school (later Government Arts College) at Kumbakonam. Gopala Rao passed his matriculation in 1857 and graduated in arts from the Madras University in first class in 1859.

In 1867, the provincial school at Kumbakonam was elevated to a government arts college. Gopala Rao and William Archer Porter were instrumental for its elevation. They were also credited with having built up the reputation of the college.

From 1870 to 1872, Gopala Rao acted as the Inspector of Schools, the first Indian to be appointed to the post. In reward for his success, Gopala Rao was made a fellow of the Madras University. In the same year, he succeeded William Archer Porter as the Principal of the Kumbakonam College and served till 1874. In 1878, Gopala Rao was appointed Professor of History and Political Economy at the Presidency College, Madras.

== Death ==
In 1883, Gopala Rao was struck with fever. He hurried to Kumbakonam for rest. Gopala Rao returned to Madras soon afterwards but died on 11 May 1886.
