= Mankurussi =

Town in Kerala, India

Coordinates: 10.79379°N 76.52018°E

Mankurussi or Mankurissi is a small town in Palakkad district in the state of Kerala, India. It is a part of Mankara grama panchayat.

== Location ==
Mankurussi is midway between Palakkad and Ottapalam, located 17 km from Palakkad town in the Palakkad-Ponnani State Highway. It is located on the banks of river Bharathapuzha (Nila). Mankurussi finds place even in some very old books and the word 'Mankurussi' means 'The Birthplace of Great men' (as quoted by a famous saint).

== Economy ==
Mankurussi is a developing town and Mankurussi junction connects the place called Kallur to the rest of the world. The Mankurussi junction has small shopping complexes with a post office, two medical shops, one internet cafe, one auditorium, some small hotels and stationery and grocery shops. The rice mill located very near to the junction is a very old establishment. Mankurussi also has a Primary School located on the way to Kallur.

== Tourism ==
Mankurussi Bhagavthi temple (Mankurussi Bhagavathy Temple in Googlemaps) is a temple located there. It has Bhagavathy, Lord Shiva, Lord Ayyappa and Lord Ganapathi as the main idols of worship. It also has a Devaswom building with a hall and committee offices and also there is a pond behind the temple which faces the paddy fields. The 'Karthika Vilakku Mahotsavam' festival is held there. Also 'Ashtabandha Kalasam', 'Shiva raathri' and 'Aana oottu' are celebrated. The 'annadanam' conducted for 10 days every year is known locally, and people from various places come and have Bhagavathi's 'prasadam'.

== Transportation ==
Mankurussi town connects to other parts of India through Palakkad city. National Highway No.544 connects to Coimbatore and Bangalore. Other parts of Kerala is accessed through National Highway No.66 going through Thrissur. Calicut International Airport, Cochin International Airport and Coimbatore Airport are the nearest airports. Shoranur Junction railway station is the nearest major railway station.
