= G. A. Natesan =

Indian journalist

Ganapathi Agraharam Annadhurai Natesan
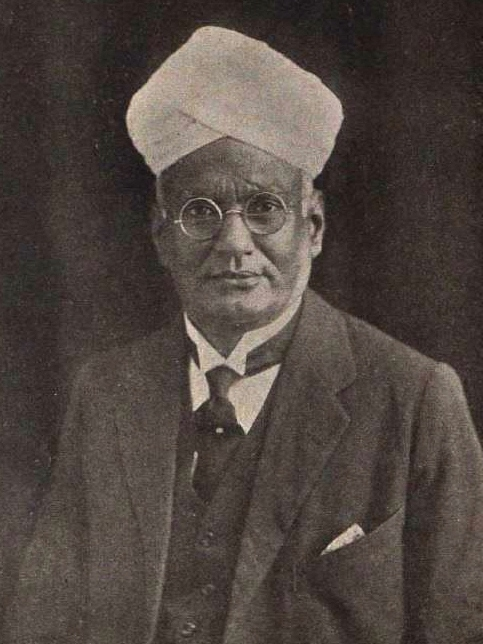
- G. A. Natesan in 1933
- Born: 25 August 1873; Ganapathi Agraharam, Thanjavur district
- Died: 29 April 1948 (aged 74)
- Occupations: Writer, Journalist, Politician, Publisher
- Spouse: Mangalamma

Ganapathi Agraharam Annadhurai Natesan (25 August 1873 – 29 April 1948) was an Indian writer, journalist, publisher, politician and freedom-fighter from the erstwhile Madras Presidency. He was the founder and proprietor of G. A. Natesan & Co. which published nationalist books, the most prominent among whom was The Indian Review.

== Early life ==
Natesan was born in the village of Ganapathi Agraharam in Thanjavur district on 25 August 1873. He had his schooling in Kumbakonam He graduated in arts from the Presidency College, Madras and started a career as a publisher. He first apprenticed under Glyn Barlow before starting his own publishing company, G. A. Natesan & Co. in 1897.

== Indian independence movement ==
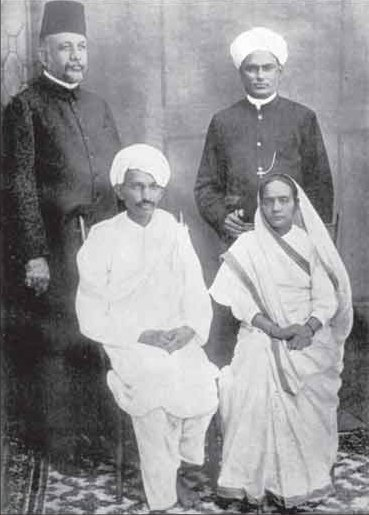
Gandhi and Kasturba, with Hasan (left) and G. A. Natesan (right), Madras (1915)

Natesan was involved with the Indian independence movement right from his early days. In 1900, he started The Indian Review, a monthly publication in English. While covering mostly nationalistic themes, The Indian Review also included literary reviews, illustrations and sections on economy and agriculture. Natesan advertised on the front page that his publication was "devoted to the discussion of all topics of interest".

When Mahatma Gandhi visited Madras for the first time since his arrival in India in 1915, he stayed at Natesan's house at Thambu Chetty Street, Georgetown. His stay lasted from 17 April 1915 to 8 May 1915.

== Later life ==
In his later life, Natesan underwent a change of ideology and joined the Indian Liberal Party. He was elected Joint Secretary of the Liberal Party in 1922. He was first nominated as a non-official member to the Council of State in 1923 and for a second time in 1931. During his tenure as a member of the Council of State, Natesan served as member of the Indian Delegation to the Empire Parliamentary Association in Canada. He also served as the member of the Indian Iron and Steel Tariff Board in 1933–34. Natesan was appointed Sheriff of Madras in 1938.

== Death ==
Natesan died on 29 April 1948 at the age of 74. He remained active until his death.
