= Salem riots of 1882 =

The Salem riots of 1882 were serious Hindu-Muslim disturbances which took place in the city of Salem, Tamil Nadu, in the then Madras Presidency in August 1882.

== Causes ==
The riots are believed to have originated by the objection of Hindus to the construction of a mosque by the Muslims of the Sevvoypettai area of the city of Salem on the path of a Hindu religious procession. When the Hindus of Salem insisted upon their right to continue their procession through the mosque, riots followed.

== Events ==
Full-scale riots erupted in August 1882. For three days, the British government had no authority in Salem city. The mosque was pulled down and there was indiscriminate killing on both sides. Eventually, peace was restored. Large number of alleged suspects were arrested, speedily convicted and given harsh imprisonment terms at the Andaman Cellular Jail.

== Aftermath ==
The atmosphere continued to remain tense till 1884. The police arrested a large number of Indian nationalists accusing them of instigating the violence. The partisan behavior of the Madras government and the Governor's handling of the situation were sharply criticized by the Indian media. An Indian nationalist newspaper The Hindu criticised the administration thus:

... the prosecution of the so called Salem Rioters and their convictions were the result of a premeditated design, hastily formed and executed in a vindictive spirit, not very honourable and utterly unworthy of a civilised Government....

One of the arrested suspects, C. Vijayaraghavachariar, a member of the Salem municipality, eventually proved his innocence and even won back his municipality seat along with a compensation sanctioned by the Secretary of State for India. Vijayaraghavachariar would eventually emerge as one of the pioneers of the Indian National Congress and foremost leaders of the Indian Independence movement.

== Bibliography ==
- R. Suntharalingam (1968). The Salem riots, 1882: judiciary versus executive in the mediation of a communal dispute, Issue 78 of International conference on Asian history. Dept. of History, University of Malaya.
