= Saraswathi Mahal Library =

Library located in Thanjavur (Tanjore), Tamil Nadu, India

Coordinates: 10°47′29″N 79°8′10″E

Maharaja Serfoji's Sarasvati Mahal Library
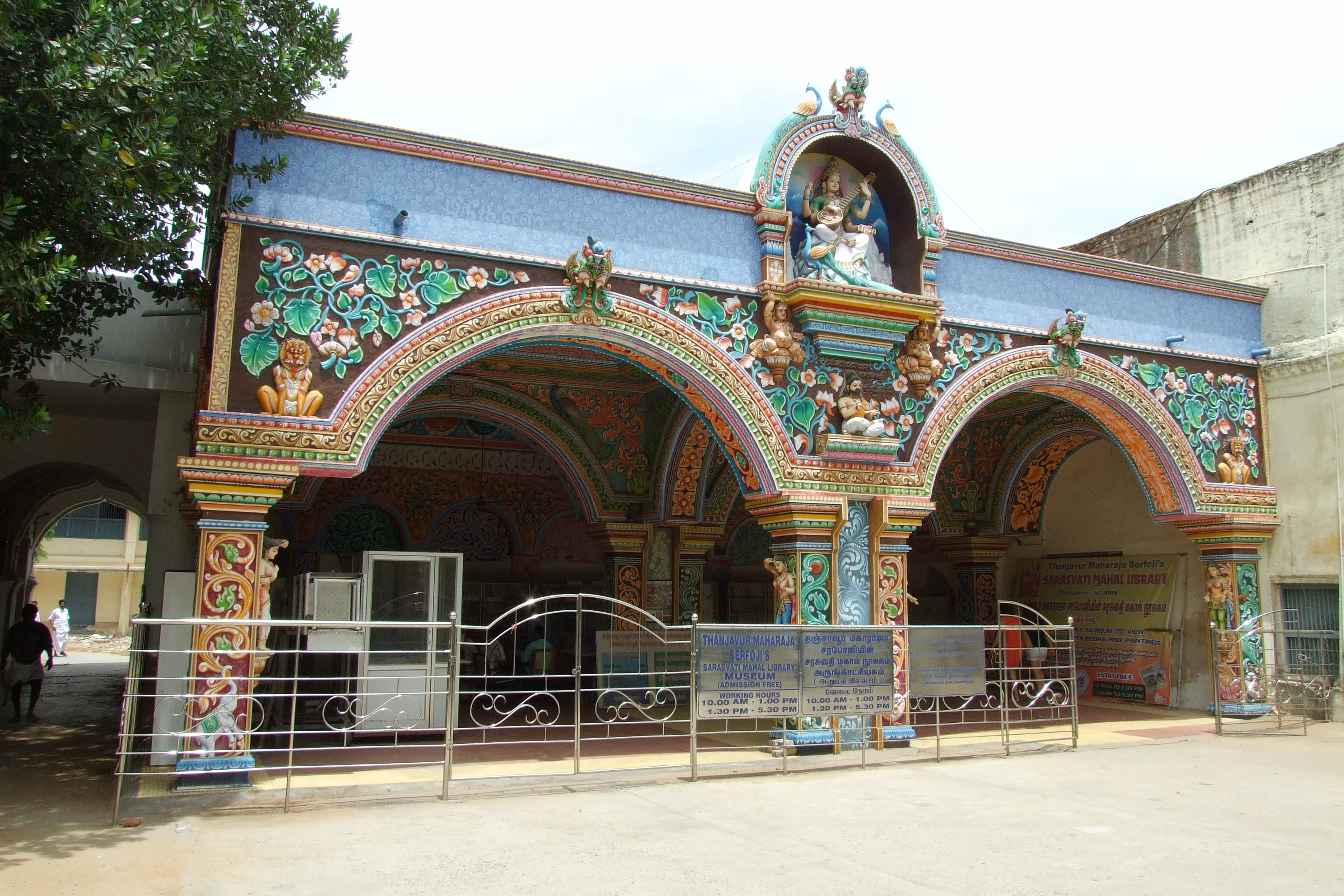
- Maharaja Serfoji's Sarasvati Mahal Library
- Location: Thanjavur, India
- Type: Medieval library
- Established: 16th century
- Branches: N/A

Collection
- Items collected: Books and Manuscripts
- Size: More than 49,000

Access and use
- Circulation: Open to public

Other information
- Website: tmssmlibrary.com

Saraswathi Mahal Library, also called Thanjavur Maharaja Serfoji's Saraswathi Mahal Library is a library located in Thanjavur (Tanjore), Tamil Nadu, India. It is one of the oldest subsisting libraries in Asia established during 16th century by the Nayak kings of Thanjavur and has on display a rare collection of Palm leaf manuscripts and paper written in Tamil and Sanskrit and a few other indigenous languages of india (especially southern regional languages). The collection comprises well over 49,000 volumes, though only a tiny fraction of these are on display. The library has a complete catalog of holdings, which is being made available online. Some rare holdings can be viewed on site by prior arrangement. Encyclopedia Britannica mentions the library as the "Most remarkable library of India".

== History ==
The Saraswathi Mahal library was started by Nayak Kings of Tanjavur as a Royal Library for the private intellectual enrichment of Kings and their family of Thanjavur (see Nayaks of Tanjore) who ruled from 1535 CE till 1676 CE. The Maratha rulers who captured Thanjavur in 1675 promoted local culture and further developed the Royal Palace Library until 1855. Most notable among the Maratha Kings was Serfoji II (1798–1832), who was an eminent scholar in many branches of learning and the arts. In his early age Sarfoji studied under the influence of the German missonary Christian Friedrich Schwartz, and learned many languages including English, French, Italian and Latin. He enthusiastically took special interest in the enrichment of the Library, employing many Pandits to collect, buy and copy a vast number of works from all renowned Centres of Sanskrit learning in Northern India and other far-flung areas.

During 1918 the Saraswathi Mahal Library was open to public. The Library is located within the campus of Tanjavur palace.

== Security ==
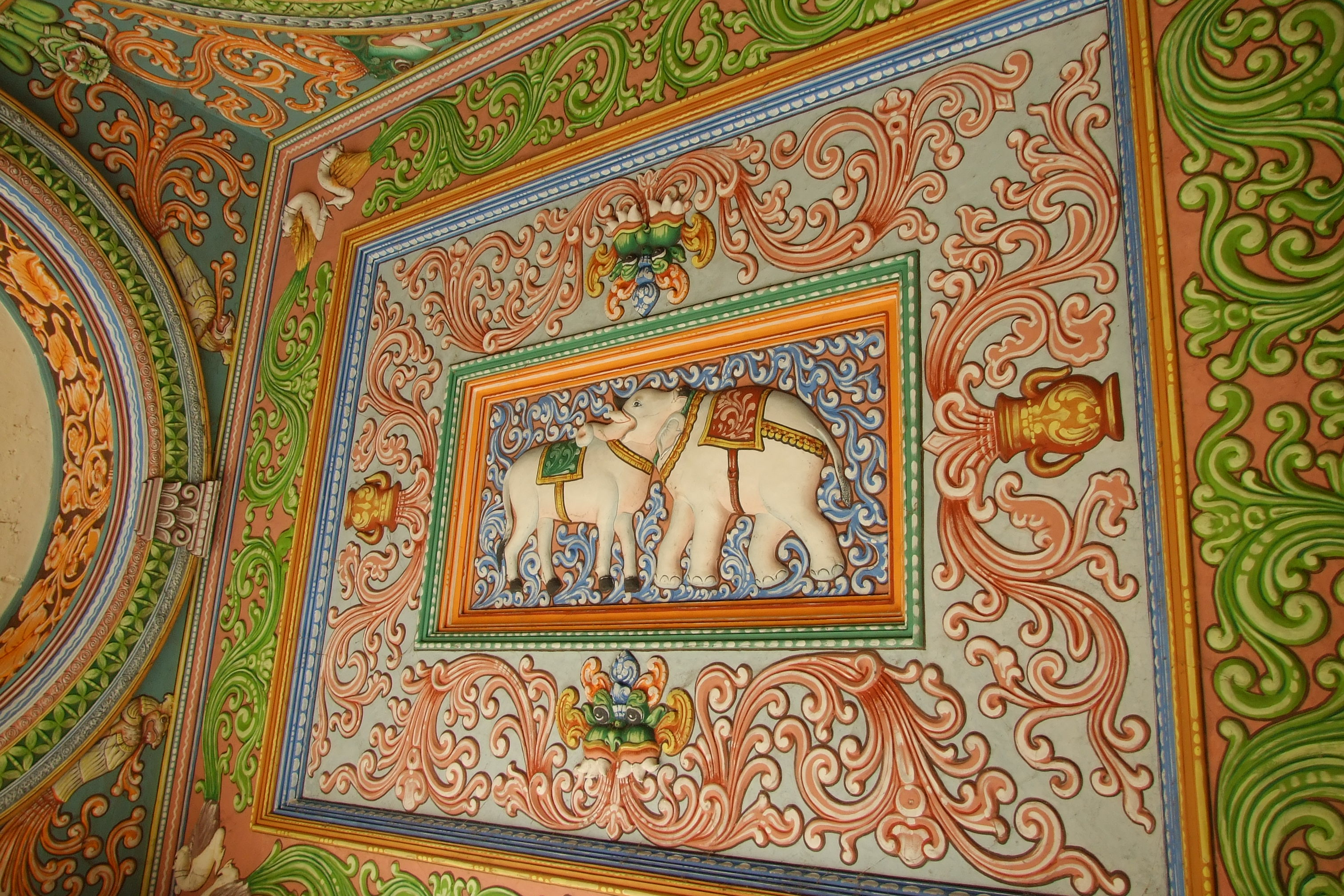
Painting outside the Sarasvati Mahal Library.

The library is open to the public; it also supports efforts to publish rare manuscripts from the collection, as well as ensuring all volumes are preserved on microfilm. The Library has installed computers in 1998 for the Computerisation of Library activities. As a first phase, the Library catalogues are being stored in the Computer for easy information retrieval. It is also proposed to digitalise the manuscripts of this Library shortly.

== The Collection ==
The bulk of the manuscripts (39,300) are in Tamil and Sanskrit. Manuscripts number over 4500, comprising titles in literature and medicine. The Library has a collection of 3076 Marathi manuscripts from the South Indian Maharastrian of the 17th, 18th, and 19th centuries; this includes the hierarchy of the Saints of Maharashtra belonging to Sri Ramadasi and Dattatreya Mutts. The Marathi manuscripts are mostly on paper but a few were written in Telugu script on palm-leaf. There are 846 Telugu manuscripts in the holdings, mostly on palm leaf. There are 22 Persian and Urdu manuscripts mostly of 19th century also within the collection. The library also holds medical records of Ayurveda scholars, including patient case studies and interviews in the manuscripts classified under the Dhanvantari section.

Apart from these manuscripts there are 1342 bundles of Maratha Raj records available at the Library. The Raj records were written in the Modi script (fast script for Devanagari) of the Marathi language. These records encompass the information of the political, cultural and social administration of the Maratha kings of Thanjavur.

== Some of the rare books and manuscripts ==
- Dr. Samuel Johnson's dictionary published in 1784
- The pictorial Bible printed in Amsterdam in the year 1791
- The Madras Almanac printed in 1807
- Lavoisier's Traité Élémentaire de Chimie ("Elements of Chemistry")
- The notes of Bishop Heber on Raja Serfoji II
- The correspondence letters of William Torin of London who purchased a lot of books for Raja Serfoji II and the Saraswathi Mahal Library
- Ancient maps of the world
- Town planning documents of Thanjavur including the underground drainage system, the fresh water supply ducting system

== Library museum ==
Efforts were made to microfilm and catalogue the contents way back in 1965 when Indira Gandhi was Information and Broadcasting Minister, Government of India who sanctioned the fund for the library's development. Since then no efforts were made to scan the documents and computerise the same using present day technology. It is also a designated 'Manuscript Conservation Centre' (MCC) under the National Mission for Manuscripts established in 2003.

== See Also ==
- Connemara Public Library
- Government Oriental Manuscripts Library and Research Centre
- Adyar Library
