= Mocharla Ramachandra Rao =

Indian freedom fighter

Dewan Bahadur Sir Mocharla Ramachandra Rao Pantulu Garu Kaisar-i-Hind Medal, 1st Class was an Indian freedom fighter and statesman who was president of the 4th Andhra Mahasabha and represented the Godavari, Kistna, and Guntur districts in the Legislative Council of Madras. He was allied with the Mylapore group, and known as the 'Gokhale of South India' after a famous description of V. S. Srinivasa Sastri.
