= R. Ramachandra Rao =

Indian mathematician and civil servant (1871–1936)

Raghunatha Rao Ramachandra Rao
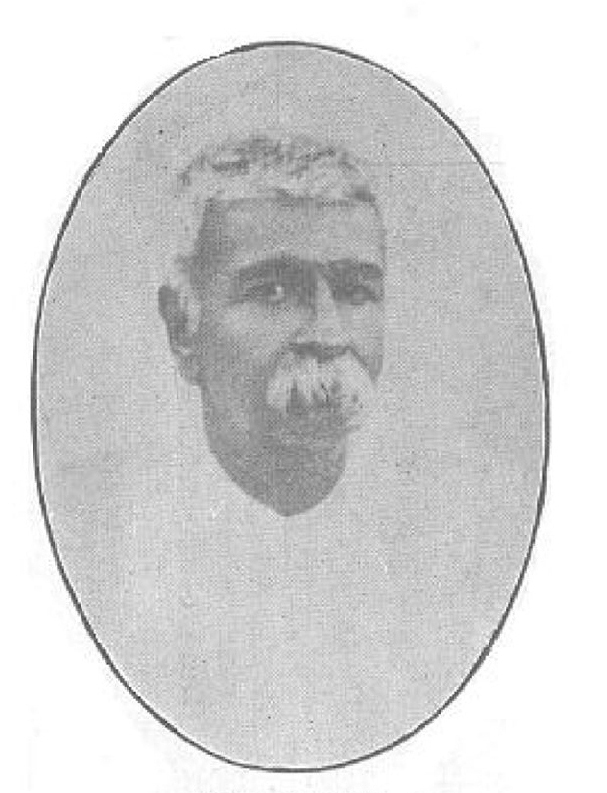
- A portrait of R. Ramachandra Rao
- Born: 1871
- Died: July 1936 (age 65)
- Education: Presidency College, Madras
- Occupation: lawyer
- Employer: Government of Madras Presidency
- Known for: civil servant

Diwan Bahadur Raghunatha Rao Ramachandra Rao (c. 1871 – July 1936) was an Indian civil servant, mathematician and social and political activist who served as District Collector in British India. He was a member of the Mylapore clique.

== Early life and education ==
Ramachandra Rao was born in an aristocratic Thanjavur Marathi Deshastha Brahmin family in 1871. He had his schooling in Trivandrum and graduated from the Presidency College, Madras.

== Career ==
Rao entered the Indian Civil Service in 1890 at the age of nineteen. He served as Assistant Collector and Magistrate from 1890 to 1891 and as an official in the Revenue Department from 1891 to 1892. Rao became Deputy Collector in 1892 and Sub Collector in 1898. In 1901, Rao was appointed District Collector of Kurnool and served till 1907. He served as Registrar of Cooperative Societies from 1907 to 1910. From 1910 to 1914, Rao served as District Collector of Nellore and in the Indian Public Services Commission from 4 to 20 January 1914. Rao retired as District Collector of Madras in 1926.

== Later years and death ==
After his retirement, Rao devoted his time to social and political activities. He organised an All India Exhibition in Madras during the 1927 Indian National Congress session. Rao always wore Swadeshi clothes and was a close associate of C. Rajagopalachari.

Ramachandra Rao suffered a paralytic stroke in 1930. Following the stroke, Ramachandra Rao was confined to his bed. He died in July 1936 at the age of 65.

== Other interests ==
Ramachandra Rao was a keen mathematician and astronomer and served as President of the Indian Mathematical Society. He was president of the Indian Mathematical Society from 1915-17. He assisted mathematician Srinivasa Ramanujan when he was jobless and got him a clerk's job at the Madras Port Trust.

== In popular culture ==
In the Tamil biographical film Ramanujan (2014), actor Sarath Babu played the character Diwan Bahadur R. Ramachandra Rao ICS. The movie itself was about Srinivasa Ramanujan, one of the greatest mathematicians.
