= Gustav Solomon Oppert =

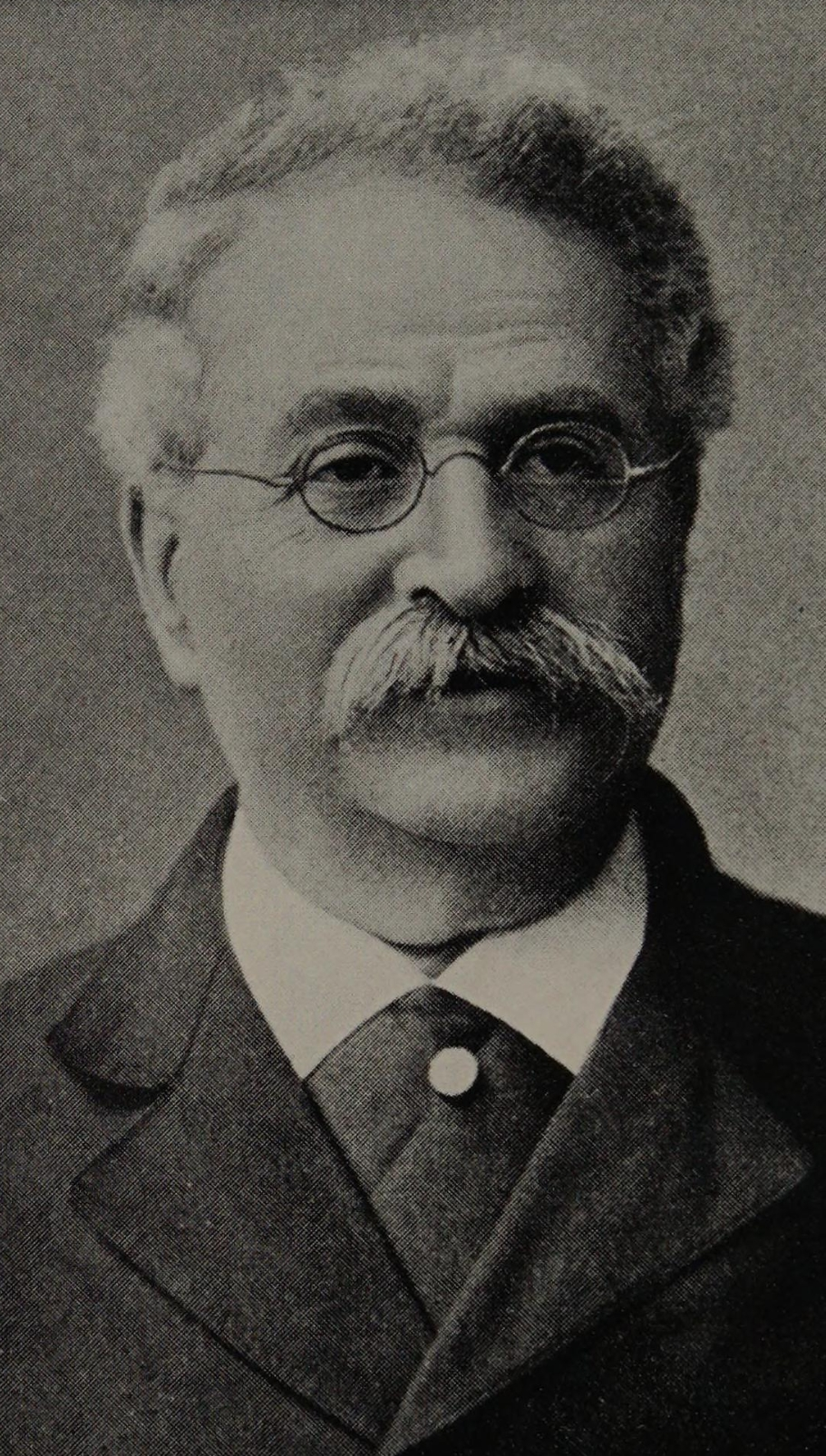

Gustav Solomon Oppert (30 July 1836 – 1 March 1908) was a German Indologist and Sanskritist. He was a professor of Sanskrit and Comparative Philology, Presidency College, Madras, a Telugu translator to government, and a curator in the Government Oriental Manuscripts Library and Research Centre. He was a professor in Madras from 1872 to 1893. He was also editor of the Madras Journal of Literature and Science from 1878 to 1882. After traveling in north India from 1893 to 1894, he returned to Europe in 1894.

== Early life ==
Oppert was born in Hamburg to Eduard (born Oppenheime, 1792-1874r) and Henriette née Gans (1800-1875) and counted Julius Oppert and Ernst Oppert among his eleven siblings. He studied at the Johanneum in Hamburg followed by studies at Leipzig, Halle and Berlin, obtained a PhD in 1860 in oriental languages. He travelled to Venice in 1861 and in 1866, he became an assistant librarian at the Bodleian Library in Oxford, England. He also took a similar post at Windsor Castle for Queen Victoria.

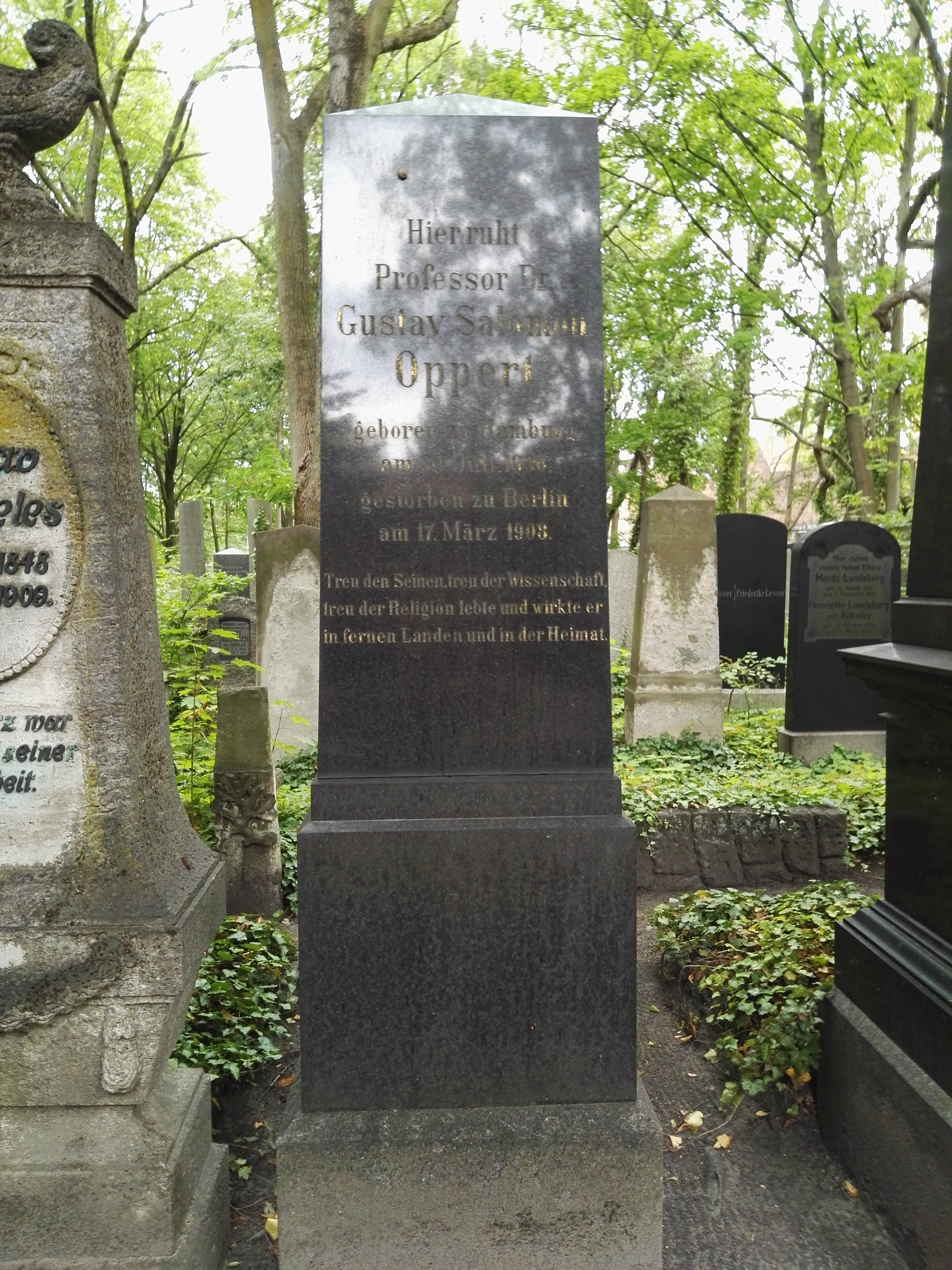
Grave in Berlin

== Orientalist ==
In 1872, Oppert was appointed professor of Sanskrit at the Presidency College in Madras. He stayed in that post until 1893, when he left to conduct a tour of north India, China, Japan and the United States before returning to Berlin to become privat-docent in Dravidian languages at the university.

Oppert's significant writings are On the classification of languages (1879), On the weapons, army, organisation and Political Maxims of the ancient Hindoos (1880), Lists of Sanskrit manuscripts in Southern India (2 Vol. 1880-1885), Contributions to the history of Southern India (1882), and On the original inhabitants of Bharatavarsha of India (1893).

In the last of these, Oppert used extensive philological research to support the idea of the Dravidians as the original inhabitants of India. Among popular Dravidians, Oppert counts Thiruvalluvar, who wrote the Thirukkural, and Avvaiyar, the Tamil poet saint.

He edited the book entitled Ramarajiyamu or Narapativijayamu written in Telugu by Venkayya, when he was working at Presidency College. It was published by Vavilla Ramaswamy Sastrulu and Sons in 1923.

== Death ==
Oppert, who was unmarried and childless, died in Berlin on 1 March 1908. He was buried there at the Weissensee Jewish cemetery.
