= T. Rangachari =

Indian lawyer, politician, journalist, and legislator (1865-1945)

Diwan Bahadur T. Rangachari CIE (1865–1945) was an Indian lawyer, politician, journalist, legislator, and active in the Egmore clique.

== Early life ==
Rangachari was born in 1865 in a prominent land-owning Iyengar family of the Madras Presidency. He had his education in Madras and graduated in law. He practised successfully as a lawyer before entering the Indian Independence Movement. On the leadership of T. Rangachari, the Rangachari Committee was formed for film censorship in 1927-28 under the competitive conditions created by the variety of American movie themes, such as romance, westerns, comedies, gangster and crime stories, when the Indian market was surviving mostly on mythological stories.

== Politics ==
Soon after the formation of the Indian National Congress, Rangachari joined the organisation and participated in its meetings. Rangachari was also a member of the Madras Mahajana Sabha.

Rangachari was elected to the Corporation of Madras and also to the senate of the Madras University. He served as a member of the Madras Legislative Council and later, the Imperial Legislative Council of India. He also served as the Deputy Chairman of the Imperial Legislative Council of India.

== Death ==
Rangachari died in 1945 at the age of 80.
