= Government Oriental Manuscripts Library and Research Centre =

Library of palm-leaf manuscripts in Chennai, India

The Government Oriental Manuscripts Library and Research Centre
- Location: Chennai, India
- Type: Repository of Palm-leaf manuscripts
- Established: 1867
- Branches: N/A

Collection
- Items collected: Books and Manuscripts
- Size: More than 49,000

Access and use
- Circulation: Open to public

Other information
- Website: Official website

The Government Oriental Manuscripts Library and Research Centre is a library of palm-leaf manuscripts in Chennai, India. Established in 1867 with a palm-leaf collection from the estate of army officer and Indologist Colin Mackenzie, the library occupies a building within the University of Madras campus. It is one of the largest repositories of palm-leaf manuscripts in South India. The library is maintained by the Tourism, Culture and Hindu Religious Endowment Department of the Government of Tamil Nadu. It is one of the largest manuscript libraries in the world and among the first to share its collections online.

== History ==
The nucleus of the manuscripts preserved in the Government Oriental Manuscripts Library originated from the collections of Colonel Colin Mackenzie, India's first Surveyor-General. On his death in 1821, the bulk of Mackenzie's Collection was shipped to England. The remainder were moved from Mackenzie's house in Kilpauk to the Madras Literary Society premises from where they were transferred to their neighbour, the Fort St George College in 1828. The Government Oriental Manuscripts Library was set up in 1867 and the Mackenzie Collection, along with those of Telugu scholar C. P. Brown and the East India House (Dr. Leyden) were made over to them.Among its early curators was the German Sanskritist Gustav Solomon Oppert.

In 1913, an Indo-Saracenic building was constructed within the University of Madras campus to house the university's library and the Government Oriental Manuscripts Library and Research Centre was moved to the second floor of the building. In 1997, the Government Oriental Manuscripts Library and Research Centre was air-conditioned.

== Collection ==
The library comprises the entirety of Mackenzie's collection that hadn't been shipped to England. This included over 8000 items, mainly manuscripts, coins and antiquities, drawings, maps and printed books. The library has a total of 50000 palm-leaf manuscripts and over 40000 books and paper manuscripts.

== Activities ==
- Identifying, acquiring, classifying, and cataloguing manuscripts
- Preserving palm-leaf and paper manuscripts
- Publishing rare manuscripts in book form
- Converting manuscript images into microfilm and digital formats
- Disseminating information about manuscripts
- Publishing multilingual bulletins
- Creating awareness of manuscriptology

The administration of the library was in charge of a curator. Among the prominent curators that the library had was Sanskrit scholar and manuscriptologist S. Kuppuswami Sastri from 1914 to 1936.

== Publications ==
The library has published catalogues of Sanskrit, Tamil, and Telugu manuscripts in its collection. It also publishes an annual Bulletin of the Government Oriental Manuscripts Library.

== See also ==
- Tamil Nadu Archives and Historical Research
- Saraswathi Mahal Library
