= T. R. Venkatarama Sastri =

Thiruvalangadu Raju Venkatarama Sastri CIE
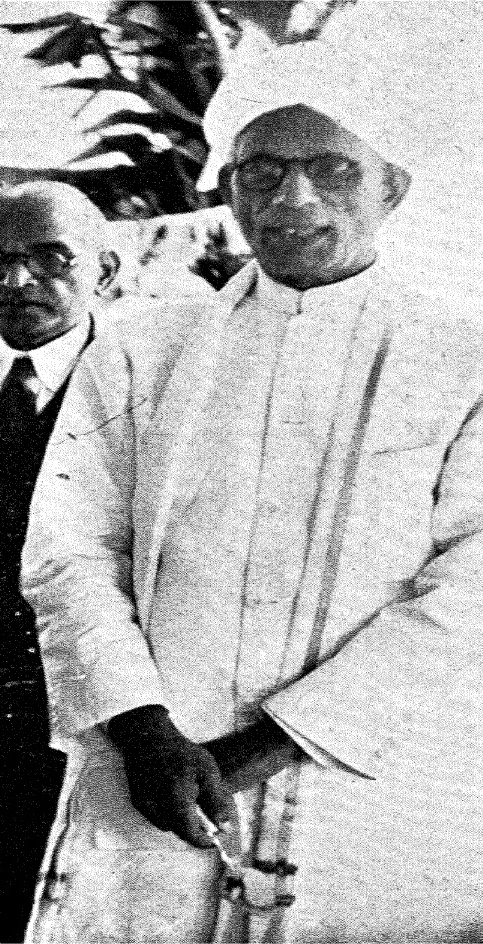
- T.R. Vankatarama Sastri in 1940

Advocate-General of Madras Presidency
- In office 1924–1928
- Preceded by: C. Madhavan Nair
- Succeeded by: Alladi Krishnaswamy Iyer

Personal details
- Born: 6 February 1874 Mayavaram, British India
- Died: 2 July 1953 (aged 79) Madras, India
- Party: Indian Liberal Party
- Occupation: Lawyer
- Profession: Attorney-General, statesman

Thiruvalangadu Raju Venkatarama Sastri CIE (6 February 1874 – 2 July 1953) was an Indian lawyer and politician who served as the Advocate-General for Madras Presidency from 1924 to 1928. He was also known as T.R.V.Sastri.

== Early life ==
Venkatarama Sastri was born on 6 February 1874 in Mayavaram (now known as Mayiladuthurai). His father, Thiruvalangadu Raju Sastri was a Sanskrit scholar. Venkatarama Sastri studied at the Municipal High School at Mayavaram, graduated from the Government College at Kumbakonam in 1894, received his B.L degree from the Law College at Madras in 1898 and enrolled in the Madras Court in April 1899 working initially as an apprentice under Sir P.S. Sivaswamy Aiyar.

== Career ==
On completion of his studies, Sastri enrolled as a lawyer in 1899 and rose to become the Advocate-General of Madras Presidency in 1924 succeeding Sir C. P. Ramaswami Iyer.

Venkatarama Sastri was also the President of the National Liberal Federation of India which in 1945 suggested the formation of a central government represented by all major political parties of India with provisions for minority representation.

T.R. Venkatarama Sastri also drafted the RSS constitution, helped lift the ban on Rashtriya Swayamsevak Sangh (RSS) and facilitated the release of M.S.Golwalker. He was a RSS sympathiser and a personal friend of Golwalkar.

== Life ==
After his tenure as the Advocate-General of Madras Presidency, he served as the Law Member in the Government of Madras, having been promoted to that position by George Goschen who did not want to offend Brahmins by excluding them from the cabinet. Additionally, Sastri also served as a Member of the Hindu Law Committee, Government of India.

In his long and illustrious career, Venkatarama Sastri served as a member of several committees, such as the Bajpai Commission on Ceylon Refugees, and B.N.Rau Committee on Hindu Code Reform.

Venkatarama Shastri made his home in the Edward Eliots Road, Chennai where he stayed until his demise. A robbery at his home was once reported to the police of which E. N. Purushothaman reminisces in his book "The Police I Served":

"..She told me of another of one of the great Advocates of Madras, Sri T.R.Venkatrama Sastry, in the Edward Eliots Road. Among the valuables stolen from this house, there was a silver idol of Vigneswara which was presented by the Paramacharya of Kanchi Kamakoti.

== Death and legacy ==
Venkatarama Sastri died on 2 July 1953. On his death, the then Chief Minister of Madras state, C. Rajagopalachari said:

"The court has lost a legal luminary and I’ve lost a good friend."
