= C. Madhavan Nair =

Indian lawyer and justice (1879–1970)

The Right Honourable Sir Chettur Madhavan Nair PC CIE

Advocate-General of Madras Presidency
- In office 1923–1924
- Preceded by: Sir C. P. Ramaswami Iyer
- Succeeded by: T. R. Venkatarama Sastri

Personal details
- Born: 24 January 1879 Mankara, Madras Presidency, British India
- Died: 5 March 1970 (aged 91) Madras, India
- Spouse(s): The Lady Madhavan Nair, Palat Parukutty Amma
- Occupation: Lawyer

Sir Chettur Madhavan Nair PC CIE (24 January 1879 – 3 March 1970) (styled Sir Madhavan Nair) was an Indian lawyer who served as Advocate-General of Madras, a justice of the Madras High Court and member of the Privy Council of the United Kingdom.

== Early life and education ==
Born in Mankara in the Malabar district, Madras Presidency (Now Palakkad District, Kerala), Madhavan Nair was the nephew of C. Sankaran Nair. Madhavan Nair was educated at Victoria College, Palakkad and matriculated from the Pachaiyappa's High School, Madras. Madhavan Nair graduated from the Madras Christian College and Madras Law College before pursuing his higher education at the University College, London and being admitted as a barrister to the Middle Temple.

== Career ==
Madhavan Nair started practising as a lawyer in the Madras High Court in 1904. He also served as a law reporter with the Madras Law Journal. Madhavan Nair served as a Government Pleader from 1919 to 1923 and Advocate-General of the Madras Presidency in 1923–24. In 1924, he had to resign as Advocate-General when appointed temporary judge and was succeeded to the post by T. R. Venkatarama Sastri. Madhavan Nair was appointed permanent judge in 1927. He served as judge of the Madras High Court till retirement on 2 January 1939, upon which he was knighted. In 1941, Madhavan Nair was appointed to the Privy Council of the United Kingdom.

== Family ==
Madhavan Nair married Parukutty Amma of the Palat family (Later Lady Madhavan Nair), the daughter of Sir C. Sankaran Nair and thus his cousin. They had two sons - Brigadier Palat Sankaran Nair, Palat Madhavan Nair and a daughter Mrs. Palat Narayani Mahadhava Menon. The couple resided at a property named Lynwood in Madhavan Nair Colony near Mahalingapuram, Madras.

Lady Madhavan Nair was the prime benefactor of the Ayyappa Temple in Madhavan Nair Colony Mahalingapuram. Daughter Narayani married Parakkat Madhava Menon ICS and has two children Parvati Ramkumaran and Janaki Nair.

C. Madhavan Nair's son P. Madhavan Nair married Rema Unni of the Parakkat family and has three children Sreelata, Madhavan and Usha
