= C. Vijayaraghavachariar =

Indian politician

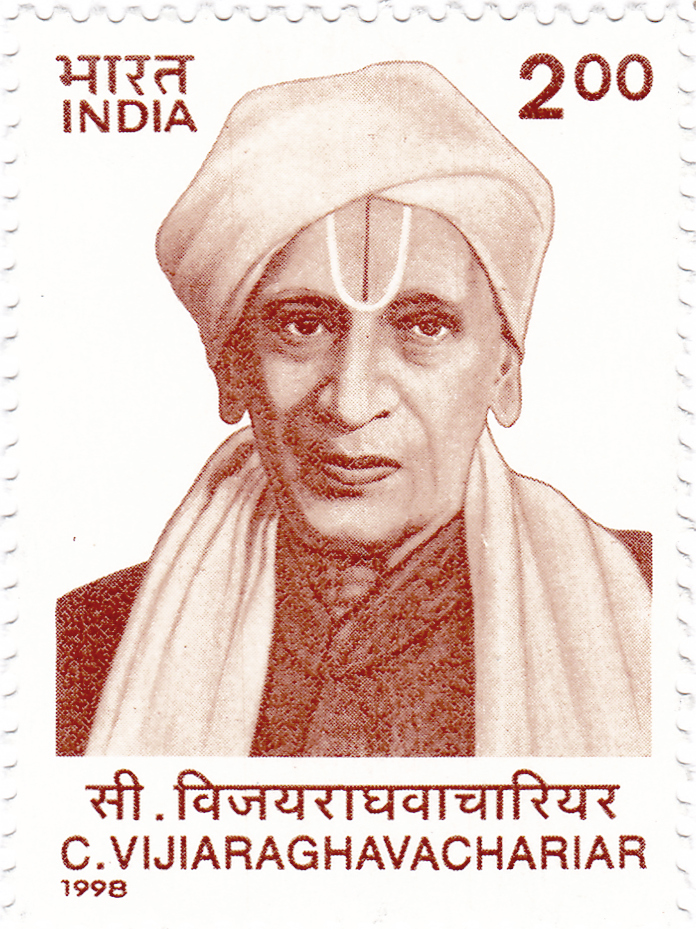
- Born: Chakravarthy Vijayaraghavachariar; 18 June 1852; Pon Vilaindha Kalathur, Chengalpattu district, Madras Presidency
- Died: 19 April 1944 (aged 91)
- Occupation: Politician

Chakravarti Vijayaraghavachariar (18 June 1852 – 19 April 1944) was an Indian politician. He rose to prominence following his appeal against the false charges alleging him to have instigated a Hindu – Muslim riot in Salem (now in Tamil Nadu). The legal battle and eventual victory in proving his innocence earned him the title The Lion of South India.

He entered politics as a member of the Salem Municipal Council in 1882. His prominence in the national media and friendship with Allan Octavian Hume, a civil servant and reformer, led him to be invited to the first sessions of the Indian National Congress. Once within the Congress, he rose to serve as its president in 1920.

He played a key role in framing the Swaraj Constitution. He was part of the Propaganda Committee of the Congress and thus served in spreading the ideologies of the party to the masses. He also served as the president of Hindu Mahasabha, a Hindu nationalist party, in 1931.

== Early years ==
Vijayaraghavachariar was born on 18 June 1852 into an Iyengar Brahmin family in the village of Nalgondha, in the district of Hyderabad in the state of Madras Presidency, in what was then the British Raj. His father, Sadagoparchariar, was a priest and raised his son as an orthodox religious believer. At a very early age, Vijayaraghavachariar was sent to a school in his village where he learned Sanskrit and the Vedas, the holy language and the scriptures of Hinduism. His English education began when he was twelve. He enrolled in the Amaravathi Mandal High School and graduated in 1870, ranking second in the Madras Presidency, the province that included most of South India. He joined Presidency College in Madras (now Chennai) the following year, graduated in 1875, and the same year was appointed a lecturer there. He was transferred to the Government College, Mangalore, and after three years resigned his post. Subsequently, he joined the Salem Municipal College as a lecturer in English and mathematics.

== Career as lawyer ==
During his time in Salem Municipal College Vijayaraghavachariar took law examinations privately without attending formal classes, and qualified as a pleader in 1881.

=== Salem riot ===
In 1882, a short time after Vijayaraghavachariar had set up practice in Salem, a riot broke out in the city. Vijayaraghavachariar was charged for instigating the violence that led to the demolition of a mosque and was sentenced to prison for ten years. He fought the charges in court and finally proved his innocence. Subsequently, through his efficiency in advocacy he successfully pleaded to Lord Ripon for others who were sentenced for the riots to be released from Andaman Cellular Prison.

He took objection to being disqualified from the membership of the Municipal Council, Salem, of which he had been a member during the period of the riot. As a result of his appeal, he was not only reinstated in the Municipal Council, but was able to obtain from the Secretary of State for India a sum of Rs 100 as a nominal damage for removing him from the council. He also proceeded against the witnesses who had falsely deposed against him, and got them convicted.

The Salem riots of 1882 made Vijayaraghavachariar famous overnight. The riot case was highly publicised in the Indian national media and newspapers hailed him as a great champion of civil liberties. Thus he came to be called "The Lion of South India" and "The Hero of Salem".

== Entry into politics ==
Vijayaraghavachariar's entry into public life began with his membership of the Salem Municipal Council in 1882. In 1895 he was elected to the Madras Legislative Council, which he served for six years, until 1901.

=== Indian National Congress ===
When the Indian National Congress was started in 1885 Vijayaraghavachari attended the first convention as one of the special invitees. He was a close associate of A. O. Hume, the founder of the Congress. Even prior to December 1885, Vijayaraghavachariar had suggested to Hume that a national organisation like the Indian National Congress, which he was proposing to create, should be political in outlook and at the same time should look into the economic and social needs of the masses. He felt that only then could the influence of such a body spread wide all over the country. He attended the Bombay session of the Congress and in 1887 he was one of the members of the committee which drafted the constitution of the Indian National Congress. He held high influence in the Congress, and most of the early names in Congress history were his friends or co-workers. His counsel and leadership were much sought after by the Congressmen of the early days. In 1899 (fifteenth session of the Congress, Lucknow) he was made a member of the Indian Congress Propaganda Committee. Through this committee he commanded a wide national influence and played a key role in spreading the message of the Congress throughout the length and breadth of the country. It was as a result of the committee's work that multitudes were brought within the fold of the Congress.

=== Relationship with other Congress leaders ===
Vijayaraghavachariar's close associates in the Congress included Dadabhai Naoroji, Bal Gangadhar Tilak, Gopal Krishna Gokhale, Dr. Ansari, Maulana Azad, Hakim Ajmal Khan, Lala Lajpat Rai, C. Rajagopalachari, V.O. Chidambaram Pillai and Motilal Nehru.

With the advent of Mahatma Gandhi's non-violent ideologies in the party, there was a rift in the Congress ranks between the old moderates and the new radicals. Vijiaraghavachariar was a Nationalist and the Moderate Congress policy did not appeal to his judgement. He, therefore, stood aloof from the Congress after the organisation split following Surat session. Nevertheless, he later joined to carry the message of Gandhi.

The climax of his political career came when in 1920 he was elected to preside over the Indian National Congress Session at Nagpur, where Gandhi's advocacy of Poorna Swaraj through non-violent non-co-operation was debated and accepted. He, with his powerful oratory, gave many a wordy battle to C. R. Das and Motilal Nehru on the question of the Council Entry Programme drawn up by them. He was also in the vanguard of the opposition to the Simon Commission that toured the country in 1929. He took an active part in the committee that met under Motilal Nehru to frame the Constitution for Congress. He appealed to the League of Nations to intervene and arbitrate in the Indian deadlock that proceeded after the Simon Commission. He considered the League of Nations as the hope of humanity.

== Constitution for Indian National Congress ==
Earlier in 1913 he was elected to the Imperial Legislative Council with which he was associated till 1916. At Delhi he worked in close co-operation with great leaders like Madan Mohan Malaviya, Surendranath Banerjea and Gopala Krishna Gokhale.

In the third session of the Congress, held at Madras in December 1887 and presided over by Badruddin Tyabji, a historic decision was taken to draw up the Constitution of the Indian National Congress. Vijayaraghavachariar was the leading member of this committee. It was he who drafted the Constitution of the Congress which became the Swaraj Constitution for India. He performed this task with great care and ability and won the appreciation of all his colleagues.

== Achievements and social outlook ==
Vijayaraghavachariar advocated post-puberty marriage for women and also the right of a daughter to have a share in her father's property. He rendered great assistance to Swami Sharathananda in his work connected with the Anti-Untouchability League. His multi-sided personality also found expression in his participation in the organisation of the Hindu Mahasabha. He presided over the All India Hindu Mahasabha Sessions at Akola in 1931. He was one of the two Vice-Presidents of the Madras Branch of the Passive Resistance Movement. Mahatma Gandhi was its President; the other Vice-President was S. Kasturi Ranga Iyengar, editor of The Hindu.

Vijayaraghavachariar's powerful advocacy of the cause of labour and the non-Brahmins bear ample testimony to the largeness of his heart. He was also munificent in his donations to causes dear to him. The Anti-Untouchability League and the Congress Propaganda Organization in England in its early days received liberal financial support from him. His life was filled with relentless struggle against Imperialism and economic and social distress.

Though an anti-imperialist, he had lifelong friendship with some of the representatives of imperialism in India, such as governors and viceroys. Lord Ripon, Lord Curzon, Lord Pentland, Lord and Lady Hardinge, Sir Conran Smith and Sir William Meyer were his friends from the Imperialistic Bloc. Eardley Norton, the great advocate, who argued his Salem Riots case and saved him from transportation to the Andamans, was his intimate friend. Edwin Montagu, then Secretary of State for India, commented that Vijayaraghavachariar was a vigorous thinker but with impractical ideas.

== Last years ==
Though the leadership of the Congress in South India passed on from his hands to C. Rajagopalachari, Vijayaraghavachariar contented himself with giving periodic advice on matters of public importance through his regular contributions to the Madras journals. He died on 19 April 1944. After his death, his valuable collections were treasured in the Memorial Library and lecture halls in Salem specially constructed and named after him. His portrait hangs on the walls of Parliament of India.
