= Madras Sanskrit College =

Sanskrit college in Chennai, India

The Madras Sanskrit College
- Motto: धीनामवित्र्यवतु (Sanskrit)
- Motto in English: And become the protector of our thoughts.
- Type: Government-aided
- Established: 1906
- Affiliations: University of Madras
- Principal: T. P. Radhakrishnan
- Location: Mylapore, Chennai, India; 13.0401°N 80.2684°E
- Website: madrassanskritcollege.edu.in

The Madras Sanskrit College is a government-aided Sanskrit college located in Mylapore, Chennai. The college was founded by an eminent jurist and philanthropist V. Krishnaswamy Iyer in 1906. In 2017, the college has launched its digital campus to disseminate and teach Sanskrit through online platform.

== Academic programmes ==
The flagship programmes of the college are Sanskrit Prak-Siromani (Foundation Course), Sanskrit Siromani Madhyama (BA) and the Sanskrit Siromani (MA) affiliated to the University of Madras offered under Choice based credit system (CBCS). The college as a rule do not charge tuition fees for these programmes. It also offers diploma and part-time certificate courses in Sanskrit.

== Research ==
The Madras Sanskrit College has been doing investigation into various Hindu texts, Indology, Sanskrit grammar and Vedas. The college offers MPhil and PhD programmes and the selection of research scholars is as per Madras University norms. The Kuppuswami Sastri Research Institute founded in 1944, is also located on the same campus.

== See also ==
- Sanskrit revival
