= Indian Home Rule movement =

Anti-colonial movement in British India

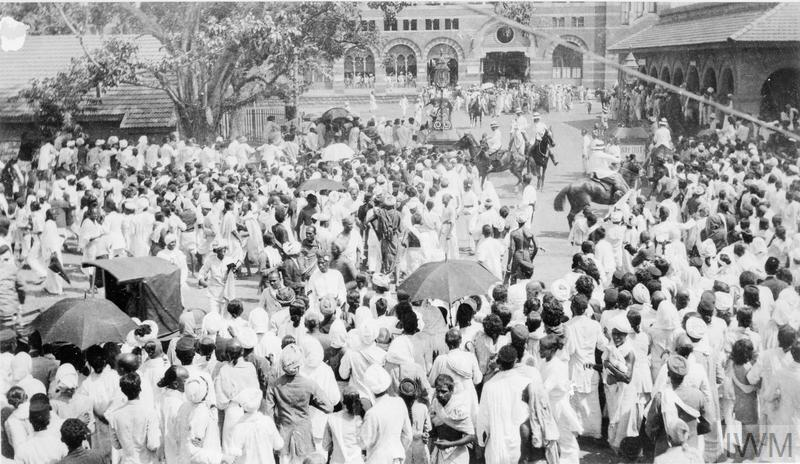
A large crowd waits for Bal Gangadhar Tilak at Central Station in Madras, 1917.

The Indian Home Rule movement was a movement in British India on the lines of the Irish Home Rule movement and other home rule movements. The movement lasted around two years between 1916–1918 and is believed to have set the stage for the Indian independence movement under the leadership of Annie Besant and Bal Gangadhar Tilak to the educated English-speaking upper class Indians. In 1920, All India Home Rule League changed its name to Swarajya Sabha.

== Flag ==
Home Rule flag

Five red and four green horizontal stripes. On the upper left quadrant was the Union Flag, which signified the Dominion status that the movement sought to achieve. A crescent and a seven-pointed star, both in white, are set in top fly. Seven white stars are arranged as in the Saptarishi constellation (the constellation Ursa Major), which is sacred to Hindus. (Note: In 1916, Suraiya Tayyabji submitted thirty new designs, in the form of a booklet funded by members of the High Court of Madras. These many proposals and recommendations did little more than keep the flag movement alive. The same year, Annie Besant and Bal Gangadhar Tilak adopted a new flag as part of the Home Rule Movement. The flag included the Union Jack in the upper left corner, a star and crescent in the upper right, and seven stars displayed diagonally from the lower right, on a background of five red and four green alternating bands. The flag resulted in the first governmental initiative against any nationalistic flag, as a magistrate in Coimbatore banned its use. The ban was followed by a public debate on the function and importance of a national flag.)

== Background ==
The Indian Home Rule movement began amidst the backdrop of the ongoing First World War. The 1909 Government of India Act failed to satisfy the demands of Indian nationalist leaders. However, the split in the congress and the absence of leaders like Tilak, who was imprisoned in Mandalay, meant that nationalistic response to the British policies remained tepid. By 1915, many factors set the stage for a new phase of nationalist movement. The rise in stature of British activist Annie Besant (who was of Irish descent and a firm supporter of the Irish Home Rule movement), the return of Tilak from exile and the growing calls for solving the split in congress began to stir the political scene in India. The Ghadar Mutiny and its suppression led to an atmosphere of resentment against British colonial rule. Wartime policies such as the 1915 Defence of India Act, which were perceived as oppressive restrictions, also contributed to the rise of the Indian Home Rule movement.

== In context of World War I ==
Most Indians and Indian political leaders had been divided in their response to World War I and the Indian soldiers fighting on behalf of the British Empire against Germany, the Austro-Hungarian Empire and the Ottoman Empire. The latter's involvement irked India's Muslims, who saw the Sultan as the Caliph of Islam.

Many Indian revolutionaries opposed the war, while moderates and liberals backed the war. The issue divided India's political classes and left the increasing demand for self-government going nowhere. Besant however declared, "England's need is India's opportunity". As editor of the New India newspaper, she attacked the colonial government of India and called for clear and decisive moves towards self-rule. As with Ireland, the government refused to discuss any changes while the war lasted. This set the stage for the movement.

== Foundation ==
Between 1916 and 1918, when the war was beginning, prominent Indians like Joseph Baptista, Muhammad Ali Jinnah, Bal Gangadhar Tilak, G. S. Khaparde, Sir S. Subramania Iyer, and the leader of the Theosophical Society, Annie Besant, decided to organize a national alliance of leagues across India, specifically to demand Home Rule, or self-government within the British Empire for all of India. Annie Besant an important personality in the Ireland history created the first Irish home rule league from which Tilak got inspired and created the first Indian home rule league to which Besant supported. Tilak found the first indian home rule league at the Bombay provincial congress at Belgaum in April 1916. Then after this Annie Besant founded second league at Adyar, Madras in September 1916. While Tilak's league worked in areas like Maharashtra (excluding Bombay city), Karnataka, Central provinces and Berar, Annie Besant's league worked in the rest of India.

The move created considerable excitement at the time, and attracted many members of the Indian National Congress and the All-India Muslim League, who had been allied since the 1916 Lucknow Pact. The leaders of the League gave fiery speeches, and petitions with hundreds of thousands of Indians as signatories were submitted to British authorities. Unification of moderates and radicals as well as unity between Muslim League and Indian National Congress was a remarkable achievement of Annie Besant.

The government arrested Annie Besant in 1917 and this led to nationwide protests. The movement actually spread out and made its impact in the interior villages of India. Many moderate leaders like Muhammad Ali Jinnah joined the movement. The League spread political awareness in new areas like Sindh, Punjab, Gujarat, United Provinces, Central Provinces, Bihar, Orissa and Madras, which all sought an active political movement.

The pressure of the movement, especially after Annie Besant's arrest, led to the Montague's declaration on 20 August 1917 which stated that "progressive realization of responsible government in India" was the policy of the British government.

During this time various meetings were held in Nellore, Kurnool, Bellary, Cuddapah, Kakinada, Rajahmundry and Vizagapatnam. In Kurnool a prominent leader, Raja Sir P. V. Madhava Rao of Panyam has supported the home rule league. The speech given by him in a meeting held in kurnool is highlighted here in which he thrashed the British Government saying the (bulk of) bureaucracy has failed to understand the needs of the people and the requirements of time. Later after the completion of meeting's in Madras Presidency many prominent leaders gave support to the league under the leadership of Annie Besant.

== Significance and impact of Home Rule movement in India ==
In India, the Home Rule movement resurrected Nationalist activities. It paved the way for extremists' re-entrance into Congress. The movement put tremendous pressure on British rule. The movement of home rule continued to provide strength to nationalist sentiments in the future and this sequence of activities eventually resulted in the Independence of India in 1947.

== Decline ==
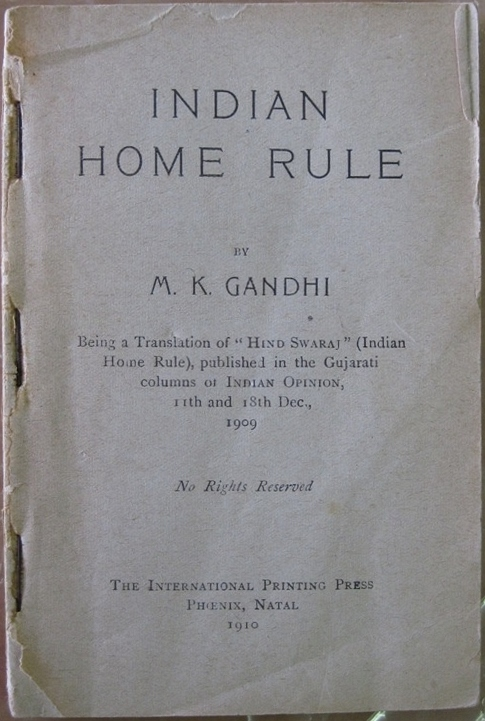
First page of the first edition of the English translation of Gandhi's "Hind Swaraj" – "Indian Home Rule" in translation. The copyright legend on this first edition bears these words: "No Rights Reserved".

The Movement was also left leaderless once Tilak left for England to pursue a libel case he had filed against Valentine Chirol and Annie Besant was largely satisfied by the promise of Reforms.

Its further growth and activity were stalled by the rise of Mahatma Gandhi and his Satyagraha art of revolution: non-violent, but mass-based civil disobedience. Gandhi's Hindu lifestyle, mannerisms and immense respect for Indian culture and the common people of India made him immensely popular with India's common people. His victories in leading the farmers of Champaran, Bihar and Kheda, Gujarat against the British authorities on tax revolts made him a national hero.

After the Montagu Declaration, also known as the August Declaration, the league agreed to suspend its expansion of the movement. After this the moderate candidates gave up the membership of league. The league believed that the British government will gradually reform the administration and local representative system by ushering in participation of local Indians.

== Dissolution ==
In 1920, the All India Home Rule League merged with Congress which elected Mahatma Gandhi as its president. Several leaders of Home Rule Movement played an important role in the national movement when it entered a truly mass movement phase under the leadership of Gandhi.
