= Mankara =

- village
- Location in Kerala, India Mankara (India)
- Coordinates: 10°47′27.275″N 76°30′1.575″E
- Country: India
- State: Kerala
- District: Palakkad

Population (2011)
  - Total: 18,781

Languages
  - Official: Malayalam, English
- Time zone: UTC+5:30 (IST)
- PIN: 678613
- Telephone code: 049128722XX
- Vehicle registration: KL-9
- Coastline: 0 kilometres (0 mi)
- Nearest city: Pathiripala
- Lok Sabha constituency: Palakkad
- Vidhan Sabha constituency: Palakkad
- Climate: Tropical monsoon (Köppen)
- Avg. summer temperature: 35 °C (95 °F)
- Avg. winter temperature: 20 °C (68 °F)

Mankara is a village and gram panchayat in Palakkad district in the state of Kerala, India.

== Demographics ==
As of 2011 India census, Mankara had a population of 18,781 with 9,074 males and 9,707 females. This Grama Panchayat has a Family Health Center at Vellarode, a Government Homoeo Dispensary at Mankurissy (Kallur Road) and a Sidha, an Ayurveda Dispensaries each in State Government Sector for health care.
