= Ganapathi Agraharam =

- village
- Location in Tamil Nadu, India
- Coordinates: 10.917°N 79.181°E
- Country: India
- State: Tamil Nadu
- District: Thanjavur

Languages
  - Official: Tamil
- Time zone: UTC+5:30 (IST)

Ganapathi Agraharam is a small village of Papanasam Taluk, in the district of Thanjavur, Tamil Nadu, India. It is famous for its panoramic beauty of agricultural fields and the river Cauvery flowing amidst them. Ganapathi Agrahram is named after the most famous Lord Maha Ganapathi temple situated at this village.

== Temples in Ganapathi Agraharam ==
There is a famous Maha Ganapthi (Ganesha) temple here. The lord has been installed by Sage Agastya and has been worshipped by Sage Gautama Maharishi. The temple deity (Ganesha) is considered very powerful by the people. It is said that Agathiyar established this temple, referring to this place as Chaturvedi Mangalam in his Nadi works. Sage Garga has referred to this temple in his works, specifically mentioning that the temple was established by Sage Agathiyar, and worshipped by Sage Gautam.

There is one Shiva temple, Shri Varadaraja Perumal temple(Vishnu), Thropathi amman (Amman)temple and (Ayyanar) temple here.

== Streets and Localities ==
Ganapathi Agraharam is a village panchayat and the main agraharam has South Street, North Street and West Street apart from other main areas. The Great Maha Ganapathi Temple lies at one corner of where South and North Street joins. The temple is adjoined by Shri Varadaraja Perumal Temple, A Ther Mutti and a vast stretch of agricultural fields. Both South and North street houses are of a typical Agraharam style construction.

== Festivals and Occasions ==
Shri Vinayaka Chathurthi Every year, A grand festival season begins before Vinayaka Chadurthi to worship Lord Maha Ganapathi and get His divine blessings. People from many other places come by this season for pooja and worship. Vedic gurus are invited to chant 4 vedas every day in the festival. The festivity of the temple begins with Summer Festival Rajagopuram Anniversary also known as "Palkudam Festival" or "Aandu Vizha" performed on "Panguni Anusham" day. Beginning in 2009, "Pavithra Utsavam" has been initiated to be performed for Maha Ganapathi every year. In 2009, it was performed on 25 November. 2010 Pavitra Utsavam was between 8 and 11 November. Maha Kumbabishegam was performed on 29 June 2012. Nearly 20000 people participated and had the blessings of Lord Maha Ganapathi.

Moreover people in this village never perform the special pujas for Lord Vinayaka in their home, because they believe the Lord Maha Ganapathi who really reside in the temple. So one who like to devote their spiritual deed upon Vinayaka has been performed in this temple itself rather individually

During Vinayaka Chathurthi, people from the agraharam prepare modhakam and offer to Lord Ganesha at the temple. Unlike other places throughout India, clay ganesha is not made and no pooja will be performed at home.
