= V. Krishnaswamy Iyer =

Indian judge

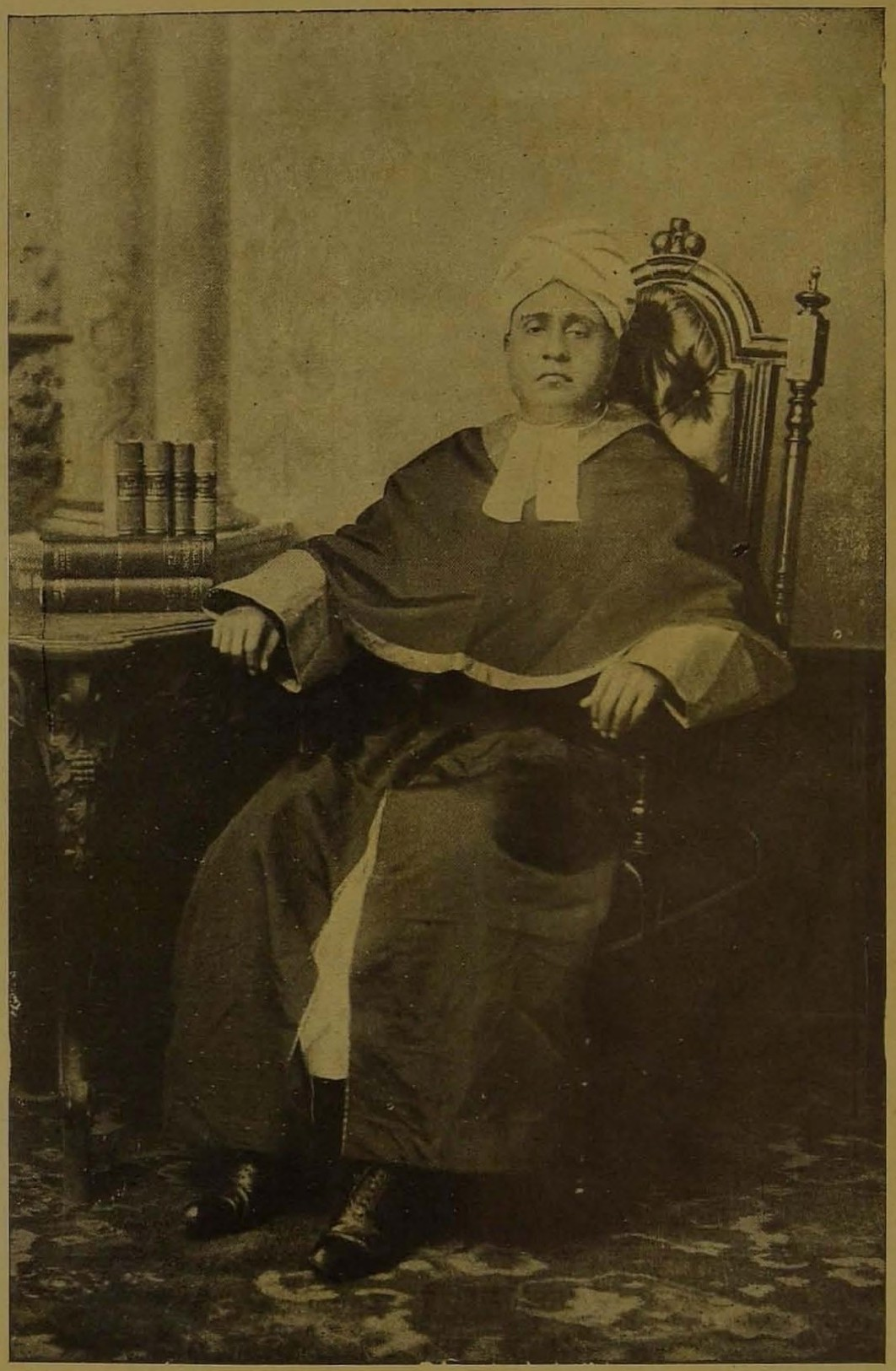
In judge's attire (1910)

Venkatarama Krishnaswamy Iyer CSI (15 June 1863 – 28 December 1911) was an Indian lawyer who served as a justice of the High Court of Madras and on the Executive Council of the Governor of Madras. He was also known as a leader in the second generation of the Mylapore clique.

He was involved in the prosecution of a partner of the British banking Company Arbuthnot & Co after the bank crashed on 22 October 1906. Following the crash, Iyer gathered together eight Indians who started a bank funded by Chettiar Capital which later became the Indian Bank. He is the first Indian to have a beach-fronted statue, when a statue of his was put up outside the Senate House, Madras University in 1912.

== Early life and education ==
Krishnaswamy Iyer was born on 15 June 1863 in Thiruvidaimarudur, Thanjavur district, the second of four sons of Venkatarama Iyer who was a District Munsif and his wife Sundari. Sundari died when Krishnaswamy was young and his father Venkatarama Iyer married again.

Krishnaswamy Iyer was educated at Thiruvidaimarudur and S. P. G. High School, Thanjavur where he was a classmate of P. S. Sivaswami Iyer. Krishnaswamy graduated from Government College, Kumbakonam and Presidency College, Madras, and obtained a law degree from Madras Law College.

== Early career ==
Krishnaswamy Iyer began practicing as a lawyer in 1885. He did not do well initially, but in 1888, when S. Ramaswamy Aiyengar, a prominent lawyer, on his appointment as District Munsiff, handed over his brief to Krishnaswamy, Krishnaswamy got the break he desired much. Krishnaswamy's rise was then, meteoric. He was elected Secretary of the Vakil's Association and in 1891, founded the Madras Law Journal with another lawyer, P. R. Sundaram Iyer.

== The Arbuthnot Bank crash ==
Krishnaswami became known when he was the contending advocate in the legal investigation of the collapse of Arbuthnot & Co, one of Madras's leading banks. In 1906, this popular bank crashed and depositors lost huge sums. Krishnaswami played a role in ensuring that the principal partner was imprisoned. The event led to his assisting in setting up the Indian Bank.

In the Summer of 1907, it was his devastating cross examination of Sir George Gough Arbuthnot that led Justice Sir S. Subramania Iyer to proceed with insolvency action against him. The following line of questioning is especially insightful into the kind of malpractices that Sir George Arbuthnot indulged in: Question (by Krishnaswamy Iyer) : Where is it stated that the amount mentioned is the balance standing against McKenzie and due by him ? Answer (Sir George Arbuthnot) : In the private ledger Question : Was it a balance due by him ? Answer : I take it, it was not Question : Why then was it carried forward every year as against him ? Answer : It was a set off in our private ledger Question : Why was this kept in his account as balance due by him ? Answer : It was in his name, but he was not responsible for it Question : If that was so, why is this stated as being due by him to the firm ? Answer : It was put in his name as amatter of account, but it was not due by him Question : Will you explain how any sum of money could be put against any man without, as a matter of fact, that money being due by him ? Answer : An account can be on any name

== Other activities ==
Krishnaswami founded Venkataramana Dispensary and Ayurvedic College on Kutchery Road in 1905 to promote indigenous forms of medicinal treatment. A year later, he started the Madras Sanskrit College. He suggested that students be given free boarding and lodging and even paid a stipend to sustain their families and that teachers be given free accommodation.

He also edited a book titled, Arya Charitram or Stories of Ancient India.

== Freedom movement ==
His involvement in public affairs drew him to the Congress party. He was instrumental in bringing together the moderate and extremist factions of the Congress Party at the 1908 session in Madras. This act of Krishnaswami was greatly appreciated by Gokhale.

Krishnaswami became a judge of the Madras High Court in 1909 at a time when he was admired in political circles. Some saw him as an impatient man keen to clear all arrears. He was judge for a mere 15 months and then became a member of the Executive Council of the Governor of Madras, a top-ranking post, offered to him by the British.

He was responsible for introducing a number of educational reforms in the University of Madras. He also took the responsibility of funding Swami Vivekananda's trip to Chicago in 1893. During the minority of the Shankaracharya of Kanchi, he intervened personally to see to it that control of the Math did not fall into wrong hands.

== Honours ==
In 1909, Krishnaswamy Iyer was elected to the Madras Legislative Council representing the Madras University. He was appointed a judge of the Madras High Court by the then Governor of Madras, Arthur Lawley, in 1909. The very same year, Krishnaswamy was awarded the Kaiser-I-Hind gold medal for his philanthropic activities. In 1911, he was appointed member of the Executive Council of the Governor of Madras.

V. Krishnaswamy Iyer Avenue, a prominent cul-de-sac in Mylapore, Chennai is named after Krishnaswamy.

== Death ==
Krishnaswamy Iyer died in Madras, on 28 December 1911 at the age of 48.

== Family ==
Krishnaswamy Iyer was married to Balambal. The couple had two sons, K. Balasubramania Aiyar and K. Chandrasekaran and four daughters, K. Balasundari Ammal, K. Savithri Ammal, K. Subbulakshmi Ammal and K. Saraswati Ammal. Two of his daughters even though they have very little schooling, Savithri Ammal and Saraswati Ammal themselves later blossomed into writers in Tamil and English.

Balasubramania Iyer was a director of the Indian Bank. He and Chandrasekhar Iyer were both successively secretaries of the Madras Sanskrit College and made it grow into a great organization. Balasubramania iyer was an MLC in Tamil Nadu and was also a member of the syndicate of Madras University. Chandrasekhara Iyer was a co-founder and vice president of the Music Academy. His great grand-daughter, Prabha Sridevan, also became a Judge of the Madras High Court, between 2000 and 2010. She later on went to head the Intellectual Property Appellate Board of India.

His great-great grandson, Srinath Sridevan, the sixth generation of this family, too is a lawyer, and is a Senior Advocate at the Madras High Court.
