= P. R. Sundaram Iyer =

Indian lawyer and judge (1862–1913)

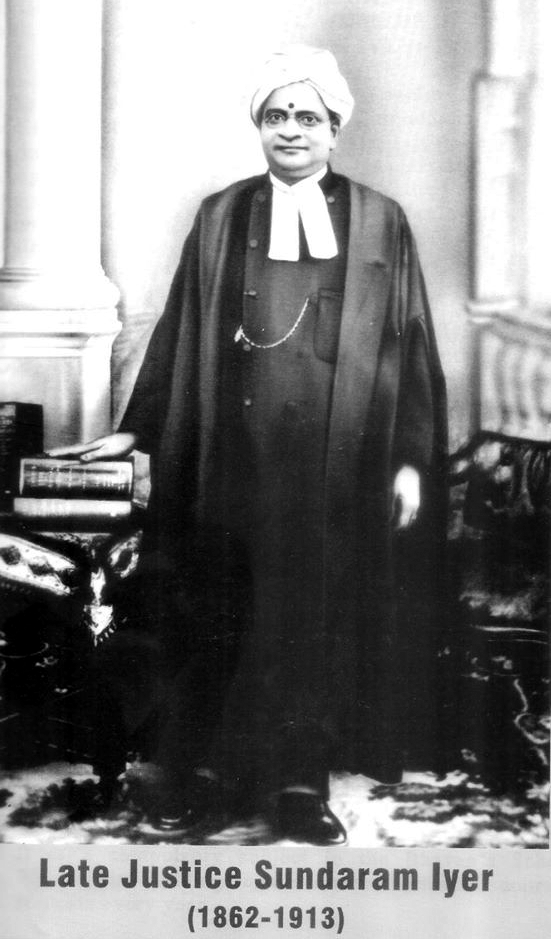
Iyer in judge's attire.

Puthucode Rama Sundaram Iyer (also spelt Sundara Aiyar) (1862–1913) was an Indian lawyer who served as one of the first Indian judges of the Madras High Court. He founded the Madras Law Journal along with V. Krishnaswamy Iyer. He is the great-grandfather of Indian cinematographer P. C. Sreeram.
