= S. Subramania Iyer =

Indian lawyer, jurist and freedom fighter (1842-1924)

Sir Subbier Subramania Iyer
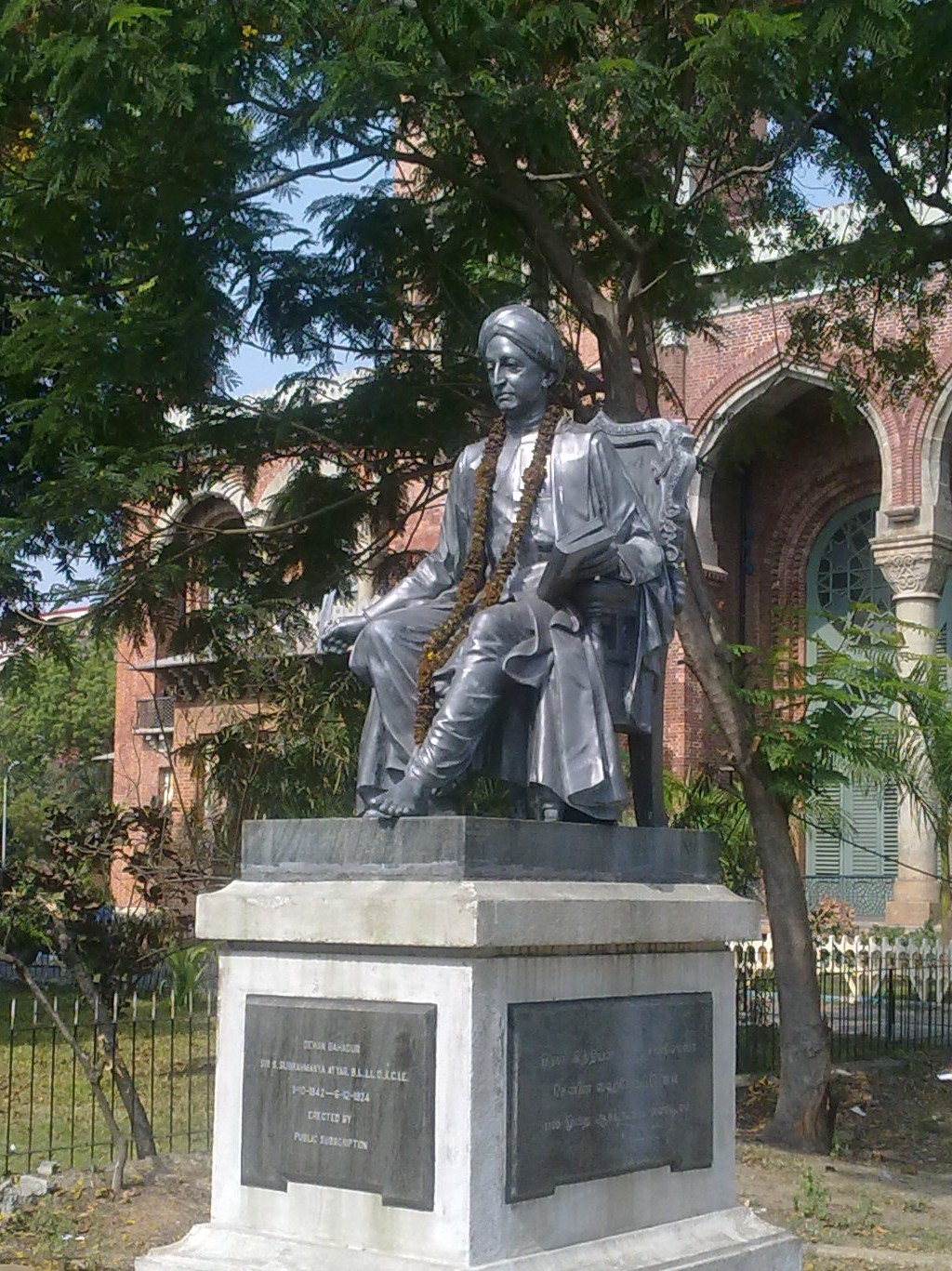
- Born: 1 October 1842; Madurai, Madras Presidency, British India
- Died: 5 December 1924 (aged 82); Madras, Madras Presidency, British India
- Occupations: Lawyer, Jurist, academic
- Spouse: Lakshmi Ammal

Sir Subbier Subramania Iyer KCIE; (1 October 1842 – 5 December 1924) was an Indian lawyer, jurist and freedom fighter who, along with Annie Besant, founded the Indian Home Rule Movement. He was popularly known as the "Grand Old Man of South India".

On completion of his schooling in Madurai, Subramania Iyer qualified as a lawyer and went on to practice as a lawyer in Madurai and Madras, before being appointed a judge of the Madras High Court, in 1891. He also served as the first Indian Chief Justice of the Madras High Court, before retiring in 1907.

== Early life and education ==
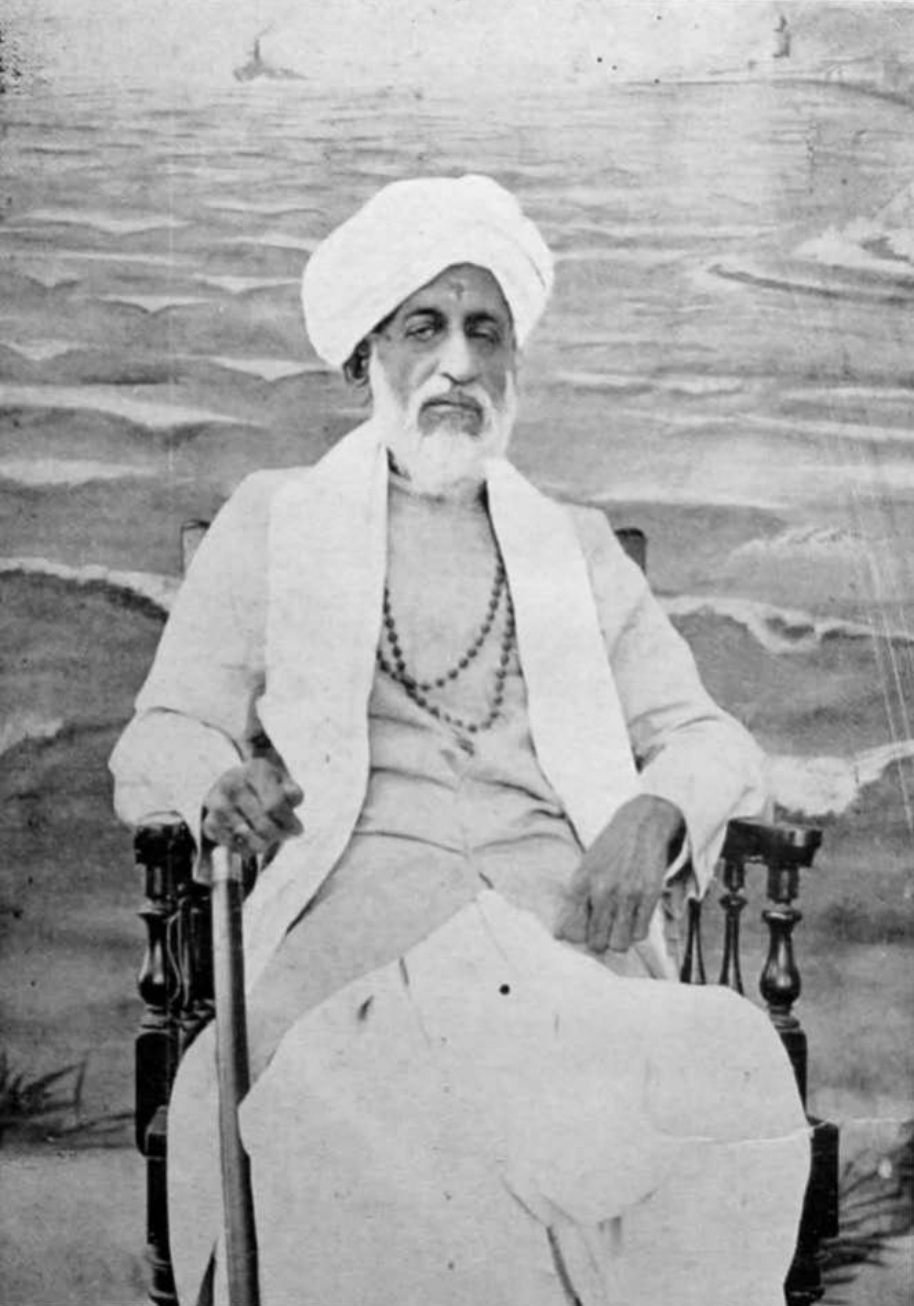

Subramania Iyer was born in Madurai in the Madras Presidency, British India on 1 October 1842. His father Sooravally Subbier Aiyer (1794–1844) was the legal agent of the Raja of Ramnad's zamindari, but died when Subramania Iyer was barely two years old. He had his early education at the English Mission School, Madurai, joining the Zilla School, Madurai, in 1856, from which institution he completed his schooling.

As his mother was not willing to send him to Madras for a higher education, Subramania Iyer decided to join the administrative service. He served as a clerk in the Deputy Collector's Office, Madurai, Deputy Collector's Office, Ramnad, and the Collector's Office, Madurai. While working in the Collector's Office, he studied privately for the Pleader's Examination and stood first among the successful candidates.

Though unable to secure a 'Sanad' to practice, he was appointed the Public Prosecutor, when the Criminal Penal Code came into force, in 1862. Desiring to practice as a lawyer, he studied privately for the Matriculation Examination and passed the same in 1865, followed by the First Arts (F.A.) examination in 1866. Two years later, in 1868, he passed the B.L. examination from Presidency College, Madras, standing first (in the Second Class) among all successful candidates. He served as an apprentice under J. C. Mill, Barrister-at-Law, and thus qualified himself to practice as a Vakil.

== Professional career ==
Practising as a Vakil at Madurai from 1869 to 1885, he appeared in some important cases, the most notable among them being the Ramnad Zamindar's Case and the Meenakshi Temple Funds Misappropriation Case. While at Madurai, he also earned a reputation as a public worker, being appointed a Municipal Commissioner of Madurai and a member of the Local Board, besides being elected a member of the Devasthanam Committee of the Meenakshi Temple at Madurai.

He presented an 'Address of Welcome', on behalf of the people of Madurai, to the Prince of Wales, who visited Madurai in 1875. In 1877, he gave evidence and pleaded for the necessity of protecting tenants from arbitrary eviction by the landlords, before the Famine Commission when it visited Madurai. He also served as the Vice-Chairman of the Madurai Municipality, from 1882 until his departure for Madras."

After his wife, Lakshmi's death in 1884, he shifted to Madras, where he emerged as a formidable rival to the redoubtable lawyers Bhashyam Aiyangar and Eardley Norton. Recognising his merit, the Government appointed him Government Pleader and Public Prosecutor in 1888, making him the first Indian to hold such a position. As Government Pleader, he appeared in two sensational cases – the Nageswara Iyer Forgery Case and the Tirupati Mahant Case. He was appointed an Acting Judge in 1891 and continued in that position until being appointed a Judge of the Madras High Court in January 1895, succeeding Sir Muthuswamy Iyer to the bench of that Court.

As a Judge, amongst other cases, he presided over the insolvency court that investigated the crash of a Madras bank, Arbuthnot & Co, in 1906. He also acted as the Chief Justice of the Madras High Court in 1899, 1903 and 1906, the first Indian to do so. After serving as a judge of the Madras High Court for 12 years, he resigned on 13 November 1907 due to failing sight, and was succeeded by Mr. Chettur Sankaran Nair.

He presented the Welcome Address to the Prince of Wales, in 1914, on behalf of the public of Madras.

== Political career ==
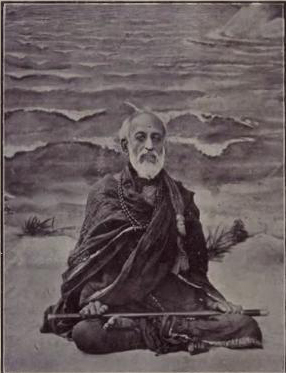
Subramania Iyer in later life

Subramania Iyer was nominated a member of the Legislative Council of Madras by the Government, in 1884 and left a creditable record as a non-official member of the Council although the rules did not permit non-official members to play a very useful role. Serving as a member of the Malabar Land Tenure Committee (1885), largely due to his initiative, an act was passed providing compensation for tenants' improvement in Malabar. Nominated for a second time, Subramania Iyer made his association with the council as useful as possible under the system extant then.

One of the founding members of the Indian National Congress, he led the Madras delegation to its first session at Bombay, in December 1885, where he seconded a resolution proposed by K. T. Telang urging the increase of the elected element in the Legislative Councils and for councillors to be given real and effective powers, and where he made the following statement, as published in the annals of the Indian National Congress of 1885:

"All of us have the utmost faith and confidence in the justice and the fairness of the English people, and we only have to solicit an enquiry into the facts, being content to leave the issue in the hands of their great political leaders."

He used to attend sessions of the Congress until he became a Judge of the High Court and contributed in no small measure to the strengthening of the Congress's organisation in the Madras Presidency.

He was close to Sir Arthur Lawley, whom he is held to have substantially influenced and assisted in his administration of the Madras Presidency, in a private capacity.

As Chairman of the Reception Committee, he welcomed the delegates to the 29th session of the Indian National Congress held at Madras in 1914. He presided over a public meeting at Madras in 1915 organised to welcome Mr. M. K. Gandhi just then returned from South Africa. Welcoming Mr. Gandhi, he suggested the lines on which national work in India should proceed:

"We want the soul-force which Mr. Gandhi is trying to work up. Soul-force consists in a man being prepared to undergo any physical or mental suffering, taking the precaution that he will not lay a single finger to inflict physical force upon the other side. It was that soul-force that was manifested by the South African Indians and it is the same force that should be developed in this country."

He agreed to serve as the Honorary President of the All India Home Rule League established in Madras on 1 September 1916, by Mrs. Annie Besant, whose arrest was ordered on 16 June 1917, by Lord Pentland, Governor of Madras. As President of the League, he took up the cause of Mrs. Besant and her colleagues and started a movement for their release, which occasioned his rupture with the Government.

Immediately after Mrs. Besant was interned, Sir Subramania Iyer wrote a letter to Woodrow Wilson, President of the United States of America describing British Rule in India and appealing for the sympathy and support of the American Government and people, in which he stated:

"Officials of an alien nation, speaking a foreign tongue, force their will upon us; they grant themselves exorbitant salaries and large allowances; they refuse us education; they sap us of our wealth; they impose crushing taxes without our consent; they cast thousands of our people into prisons for uttering patriotic sentiments-prisons so filthy that often the inmates die from loathsome diseases."

Subjected to scathing criticism in the House of Commons and the House of Lords, the Secretary of State, Edwin Montagu, and the Viceroy, Lord Chelmsford, rebuked him when he met them in Madras in 1918 to make a representation on the proposed political reforms. A few days later, Sir Subramania Iyer renounced his knighthood and returned the insignia to the Government.

== Academic interests and career ==
His interest in the scholarly aspects of law led to his residence, the Beach House on the Marina at Mylapore, being used for the "Saturday Club" that met at 11 a. m. every week, between 1888 and 1891, with all leading members of the Madras Bar participating, and cases being critically analysed. At one of these meetings it was decided to start 'The Madras Law Journal', which was inspired by the then recently established periodicals the 'Law Quarterly Review', started by Sir Frederick Pollock in England in 1885 and 'The Harvard Law Review' established by the Harvard Law School Association in 1887.

During his tenure as Judge of the Madras High Court he introduced the practice of referring to American jurisprudence in addition to the English, which had been the sole point of reference until then.

He was nominated Senator of the Madras University in 1885 and continued to be connected with that institution till 1907. As a member of the Senate, he advanced many reforms in education. He was a member of the Syndicate for the University for some time and was appointed Vice-Chancellor of the University in 1896.

The Madras University conferred on him the Honorary Degree of Doctor of Law in 1908, making him the first recipient of an honorary degree from the University. He presided over the Madras Students' Convention in 1916 and delivered the Presidential Address. He also served as the Chairman of the Council of Native Education for two years. He delivered a series of lectures at Madras University on Ancient Indian Polity, in 1914 which were published in 1916.

He extended his co-operation to Mrs. Besant in the establishment of the Central Hindu College at Benares which subsequently became the nucleus of the Benares Hindu University.

== Cultural interests ==
He was the President of the Dharma Rakshana Sabha, which he founded in 1908, and which sought to prevent the mismanagement of the funds of Hindu Religious Endowment and Charitable Trusts. He also worked for the promotion of Sanskritic study, and established two schools for Vedic Studies in Madura and Thiruparankundram. As the President of the Suddha Dharma Mandala, which he founded, he was instrumental in publishing several important Hindu religious works.

Having been greatly interested in spirituality and the study of religion he became interested in the Theosophical Society which he formally joined soon after his retirement. He was also the Vice-President of the Theosophical Society between 1907 and 1911.

As one of the prominent members his literary contributions were a regular feature of the Theosophical Society's publication The Theosophist right up to the 1920s. His participation in the activities of the Theosophical Society gradually drew him closer to Annie Besant and the Indian independence movement.

The Suddha Dharma Mandala or 'Pure Religion Society' resulted in a rift between himself and the Theosophical Society, since he desired to provide a rival world leader to Jiddu Krishnamurti, the favoured champion of the Society.

== Honours ==
The Government awarded a Certificate of Merit to Subramania Iyer on 1 January 1877 as a mark of their appreciation of his services to the public, on the occasion of the Proclamation Durbar at Delhi.

He was appointed a Companion of the Order of the Indian Empire, in 1890, and was elevated to a Knight-Commander of the same order on New Year's Day, 1900.

In 1893, he had the title of Dewan Bahadur conferred upon him.

He renounced his titles and returned the insignia of his KCIE in 1917.

== Death and progeny ==
He died on 5 December 1924 and was survived by three sons born to him by his wife Lakshmi.

== Legacy ==
The Mani Iyer Hall in Triplicane was built by the Theosophists in his memory and named after him. He is also commemorated by a statue, unveiled in 1935, outside the Senate House of the Madras University, and another one, unveiled in 1928 by Dr Annie Besant, in front of the Headquarters Building of the Theosophical Society in Adyar.

== Notes ==
- Christopher John Fuller (2004). The Renewal of the Priesthood. Oxford University Press. ISBN 0-19-566894-4.
- John Duncan Martin Derrett (1977). essays in classical and modern hindu law. BRILL. ISBN 90-04-04808-1.
- C. Jinarajadasa (2003). Golden Book of the Theosophical Society. Kessinger Publishing. ISBN 0-7661-4804-1.
- Splendid saga of TNSC Bank:Centenary of stellar growth By: V SUNDARAM, News Today, 27 November 2007
- Bibliographic Guides: Publications of Suddha Dharma Mandala By: David Reigle, Eastern Tradition, 2007
- The Theosophist October 1911 – January 1912, Google Books
- Indian Judges: Biographical & Critical Sketches By Brojendra Mitter, 1932.
- Indian Politics Since the Mutiny By Sir Chirravoori Yajneswara Chintamani, 1940.
- Role of Tamil Nadu in the Freedom Movement, From India's Central Board of Secondary Education (CBSE) Text Book
- Founding of the Home Rule League
