= V. Ramiengar =

Indian civil servant, administrator and statesman

Vembaukum Ramiengar CSI
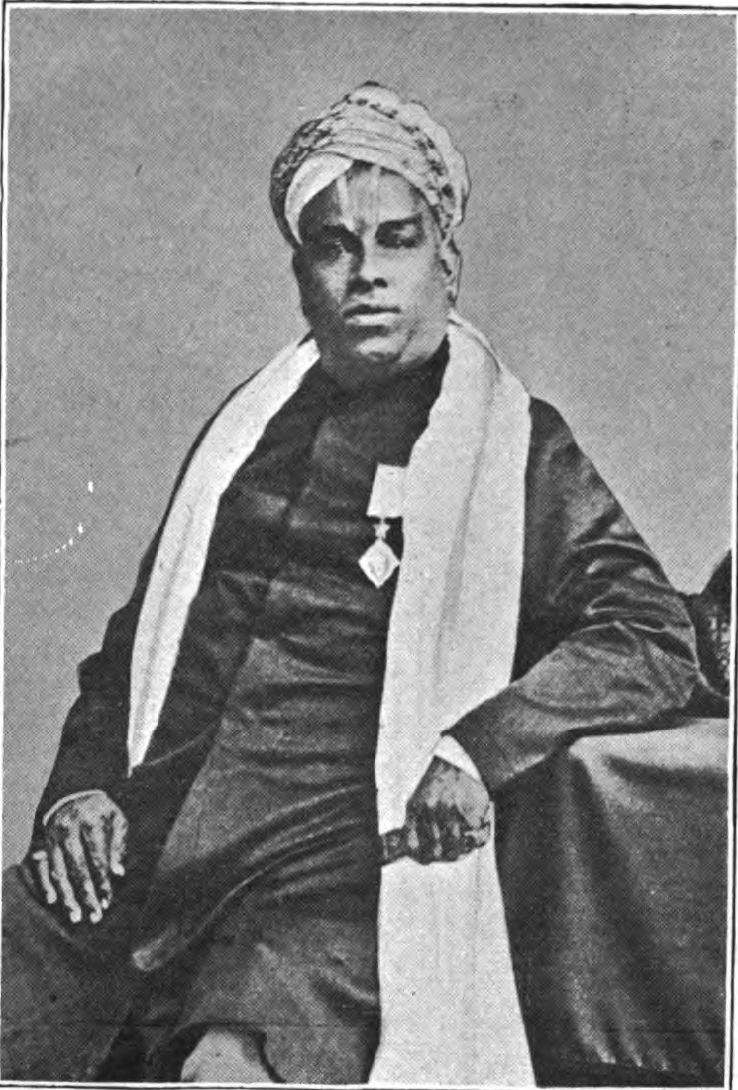
- Portrait of Vembaukum Ramiengar

Diwan of Travancore
- In office July 1880 – 1887
- Monarchs: Visakham Thirunal; Moolam Thirunal
- Preceded by: Nanoo Pillai
- Succeeded by: T. Rama Rao

Member of the Madras Legislative Council

Personal details
- Born: c. 1826 Vembaukum, Chingleput district, Madras Presidency, British India
- Died: 10 May 1887 Madras, British India
- Education: Madras University
- Occupation: Lawyer, Administrator
- Profession: Statesman

Vembaukum Ramiengar CSI (c. 1826 – 10 May 1887), also rendered Vembakkam and Rama Iengar, was an Indian civil servant, administrator, and statesman who served Sir Visakham Thirunal Rama Varma V, Maharaja of Travancore and his successor Sir Mulam Thirunal Rama Varma VI, as Diwan of Travancore from 1880 to 1887 after a lengthy career in governance in the Madras Presidency, culminating in his membership of the Madras Legislative Council from 1867 to 1879. He was a trustee of Pachaiyappa's Charities, and a member of the powerful and accomplished Vembaukum clan of Vadakalai Iyengar Brahmins originating in Vembakkam, which also produced or encompassed such contemporaries as lawyers V. Sadagopacharlu and V. Rajagopalacharlu, and Sir V. Bhashyam Aiyangar; and Mysore Dewan C. V. Rungacharlu.

== Early life ==
Ramiengar was born in the traditional Vaishnavite Brahmin Vembaukum family in Vembaukum in the then Chingleput district, Madras Presidency. He was the youngest of three sons. Ramiengar's father was a clerk and record-keeper in the service of the British East India Company.

Ramiengar was one of the six students who joined Madras (Presidency) High School, Madras, which would develop into Presidency College, when it was founded in April 1841. During his schooling, Ramiengar developed keen interest in physical science and astronomy and won a scholarship instituted by the Pachaiyappa Charities.

== Early career ==
On conclusion of his education, he was appointed as a translator in the Maratha Cutcherry. In September 1850, Ramiengar was made Head Munshi of Nellore. Ramiengar served in Nellore until early 1854, when he was made Deputy Registrar of the Department of Public Works. From 1855 to 1857, Ramiengar served as the Naib Sheristadar of Nellore. In March 1857, he was appointed Head Sheristadar of Tanjore and served from 1857 to 1859, when he was made Assistant Imam Commissioner. As Assistant Imam Commissioner, he was instrumental in the Revenue Settlement of the olungu areas of the Cauvery Delta.

In June 1860, he was appointed to inquire into the outstanding advances of the mirasdars and contractors who had borrowed money from the Madras government as flood relief funds. Ramiengar performed this task satisfactorily well that he was entrusted with the revenue settlement of the village of Nallatadi in Tanjore district.

Ramiengar was appointed Sub-Collector of Namakkal in the beginning of 1861 and promoted to a First-grade Deputy Collector in May 1861. Ramiengar served in Namakkal from May 1861 to the end of 1864, when he was appointed Assistant Commissioner of Paper Currency. Ramiengar served for a year as the Assistant Commissioner of Paper Currency and was appointed First Assistant to the Chief Secretary of the Madras Presidency in 1866. In the beginning of 1867, Ramiengar was appointed Superintendent of Stamps at a monthly salary of Rs.1000. The next year, the Government Lord Napier nominated him to the Madras Legislative Council.

== Madras Legislative Council ==
Ramiengar served in the Council starting from 1867 till 1879. He was the first Indian to serve as the official member. In 1871, Ramiengar proposed a bill to remove defects in the Religious Endowments Act of 1863, but this bill was rejected by the Government on the pretext that it was "radically incomplete and would certainly fail to attain its object"

Ramiengar served as the Municipal Commissioner of Madras city for about eight years. He was offered the Acting Presidency by the then Governor of Madras, Sir William Robinson but declined the offer. He was appointed Inspector-General of Registration in 1875 and participated in the Delhi Durbar of 1 January 1877, receiving the associated medal. In 1873, Ramiengar was chosen to go to England to provide evidence before the Parliamentary Finance Committee but declined. Ramiengar was also appointed at the behest of John Bruce Norton as a trustee of the Pachaiyappa Charities. It was during Ramiengar's tenure as a trustee that Pachaiyappa's was raised to a Second-Grade College.

== As Diwan of Travancore ==
Ramiengar was appointed Diwan of Travancore by Maharaja Visakham Thirunal in 1880 on his retirement from the Madras Civil Service and served in the princely state for a period of seven years. During his tenure, Ramiengar introduced the Indian Penal Code in Travancore and re-organised the police force of the state. He also increased the power and jurisdiction of the Munsiff Courts in order to reduce the burden on the High Court. He reorganised the revenue system in Travancore by reducing the strength of the employees while increasing their salaries at the same time. Ramiengar's most important act is believed to be the revenue survey and settlement of Travancore.

Ramiengar also introduced intramural labour in jails and remitted several taxes which were a burden on the people. He encouraged indigenous sugar industries and paper and cotton mills and introduced a stamp act in the state. Ramiengar also took steps to improve the irrigation works of Travancore.

On the eve of Ramiengar's retirement, the Maharaja acknowledged Ramiengar's contributions in his speech : "He had, in fact, during the past six years, imparted an impetus to national prosperity, the full force of which remains to be felt".

== Later life and death ==
In 1887, Ramiengar resigned as Diwan and returned to Madras on pension spending his last days in religious study. He suddenly fell ill and died on 10 May 1887.

== Legacy ==
Ramiengar is remembered for pioneering educational reforms in Travancore and revamping the educational and judicial system in the state. He is largely credited with the revenue settlement of Travancore. He is also credited with having introduced numerous reforms in Madras Presidency during his tenure as member of the legislative council.

Ramiengar was fond of reading and he frequently imported books from England and thus, amassed a huge collection which was donated by his wife to the Pachaiyappa College library on his death. Ramiengar was methodical and ordered and was one of the founders of the Madras Cosmopolitan Club of which he served as the first Secretary.

Sir Alexander Arbuthnot, prominent British businessman, administrator and a former Acting-Governor of Madras, was a close friend of Ramiengar and often spoke highly of him. He even said once that he always relied on the integrity and sound principles of the latter.

== Criticism ==
Ramiengar was often criticised for his liberal political views and loyalist tendencies. During his tenure as Dewan of Travancore, Paramesvaran Pillai anonymously published articles on the Dewan in which he launched scathing attacks on the latter's policy of favoring non-Malayalee Brahmins in the administration in place of Malayali people.

== Political inclinations ==
Ramiengar was a loyalist and Anglophile. Chatterjee and Mukhopadhyaya said he was "the first Indian in Madras to keep his house in European style, to teach English and European music to the females of his family, and to invite European gentlemen to parties at his residence".

== Honours ==
In May 1871, Ramiengar was made a Companion of the Order of the Star of India.

== Notes ==
Preceded by Nanoo Pillai	Diwan of Travancore; 1880–1887	Succeeded by T. Rama Rao
