= Advocate-General of Madras =

Government advisory to the Madras presidency

The Advocate-General of Madras was charged with advising the Government of the British-administered Madras Presidency on legal matters. The Presidency existed from 1652 to 1950. Prior to 1858, when it was administered by the East India Company, the Advocate-General was the senior law officer of that company and also the Attorney-General of the Sovereign of Great Britain and an ex-officio member of the Madras Legislative Council.

== List of Advocates-General ==
=== Madras Presidency ===
- Alexander Anstruther 1803–?1812
- Sir Samuel Toller 1812–1821
- Herbert Abingdon Draper Compton 1822–1828
- George Norton 1828–1839
- W. Bathie 1833–1834 (acting)
- Thomas Sydney Smith 1861–1863
- John Bruce Norton 1863–1868
- John Dawson Mayne 1868–1872 (acting)
- Henry Stewart Cunningham 1872–1877
- Patrick O'Sullivan 1877–1882
- Hale Horatio Shephard 1885–1887
- James Spring Branson 1887–1897
- V. Bhashyam Aiyangar 1897–1898 (acting)
- Charles Arnold White 1898–1899 (afterwards Chief Justice of Madras, 1899)
- V. Bhashyam Aiyangar 1899–1900 (acting)
- John Edward Power Wallis 1900–1906 (later Chief Justice of Madras, 1914)
- C. Sankaran Nair 1906–1907
- P. S. Sivaswami Iyer 1907–1912
- S. Srinivasa Iyengar 1912–1920
- C. P. Ramaswami Iyer 1920–1923
- C. Madhavan Nair 1923–1924
- T. R. Venkatarama Sastri 1924–1928
- Alladi Krishnaswamy Iyer 1929–1944
- P. V. Rajamannar 1944–1945 (later Chief Justice of Madras, 1948)
- K. Rajah Iyer 1945–1950
- K.Kuttikrishna Menon 1950-1951

=== Madras State ===
- V. K. Thiruvenkatachari 1951–1964
- N. Krishnaswami Reddy 1964–1966
- Mohan Kumaramangalam 1966–1967
- P.L.Narayanan viluthugal1000-10000

=== Tamil Nadu ===
Name	Tenure Start	Tenure End
Govind Swaminadhan	1967	1976
K. Parasaran	1976	1977
V. P. Raman	1977	1979
R. Krishnamoorthy	1980	1989
K. Subramaniam	1991	1994
R. Krishnamoorthy	1994	1996
K. V. Venkatapathi	1996	2001
N. R. Chandran	2001	2006
R. Viduthalai	2006	2007
G. Masilamani	2007	2009
P. S. Raman	2009	2011
A. Navaneethakrishnan	2011	2013
A. L. Somayaji	2013	2016
R. Muthukumarasamy	2016	2017
Vijay Narayan	2017	2021
R. Shunmugasundaram	2021	2023
P. S. Raman	2024	2026
Vijay Narayan	2026	
