= Vembaukum family =

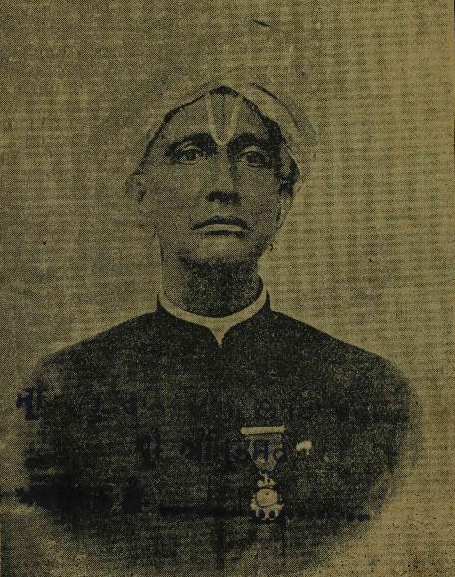

The Vembaukum or Vembakkam (Note: also Vembakkem, Venbakkam, or (in very old sources) Vembaucum) family were one of the two preeminent Brahmin dynasties in the Madras Presidency, dominating the Mylapore clique alongside the Calamur clan, and 'possess(ing) an enormous presence in the... bureaucracy of the capital and its surrounding district(s)', whose historical presence began in the 1820s, with the sprawling clan famously having begun holding yearly family conferences by the 1890s to preserve their dynastic unity, political cohesion and influence, and wealth.

Populated by numerous elite lawyers and administrators, the Vembaukum were originally Vadakalai Iyengars from Vembakkam in the Chingleput District of the Madras Presidency (in contrast to the Calamurs, who were Vadama Iyers from North Arcot). The Law Weekly, a legal journal, has been edited and published by the family for over a century.

== Members ==
- V. Ramiengar CSI, Diwan of Travancore
- V. Bhashyam Aiyangar CIE, Advocate-General, Justice of the High Court
- C. R. Thiruvenkatachari, Justice of the High Court
- C. V. Rungacharlu CIE, Diwan of Mysore
- S. Srinivasa Iyengar CIE, Advocate-General, Law Member of the Executive Council
- V. C. Desikachariar, member of the Legislative Council of Madras
- V. Sadagopacharlu, first Indian member of the Legislative Council of Madras
- V. Rajagopalacharlu
- V. C. Gopalratnam
- Ambujammal
- S. Varadachariar (Note: Son of the core family's head priest)
