= P. S. Raman =

Indian lawyer

Advocate-General of Tamil Nadu
- In office 12 January 2024 – 12 May 2026
- Appointed by: R. N. Ravi (Governor of Tamil Nadu)
- Preceded by: R. Shunmugasundaram
- In office 29 July 2009 – 24 May 2011
- Appointed by: Surjit Singh Barnala (Governor of Tamil Nadu)
- Preceded by: G. Masilamani
- Succeeded by: A. Navaneethakrishnan

Personal details
- Born: 7 November 1960 (age 65) Madras, Madras State (now Chennai, Tamil Nadu), India
- Relations: Mohan Raman (brother); Vidyullekha Raman (niece)
- Parent: V. P. Raman (father)
- Education: Loyola College, Chennai
- Occupation: Senior Advocate

Pattabhi Sundar Raman (born 7 November 1960) is an Indian Senior Advocate who is the incumbent Advocate-General of Tamil Nadu. He is the younger son of V. P. Raman, who himself was a former Advocate-General of the State.

== Early life and education ==
Pattabhi Sundar Raman was born on 7 November 1960 in present-day Chennai, Tamil Nadu. His father V. P. Raman served as the third Advocate-General of Tamil Nadu during 1977-79, and was also a politician from the Dravida Munnetra Kazhagam (DMK). Sundar Raman's elder brother is the stage and television actor Mohan Raman.

Sundar Raman did his schooling in Vidya Mandir, Chennai and graduated in commerce from Loyola College, Chennai. Later, he obtained his law degree from the Madras Law College.

== Career ==
Raman started practising as a lawyer in 1985 and founded the law firm Raman and Associates on the death of his father in 1991.

Raman practised in the Madras High Court and the Supreme Court of India and was, in September 2004, designated a senior advocate of the Madras High Court. On 11 June 2006, Raman was appointed Additional Advocate-General in place of R. Mutthukumaraswamy who had resigned.

=== Advocate-General of Tamil Nadu (2009-11; 2024-) ===
Raman succeeded G. Masilamani to become the 11th Advocate-General of Tamil Nadu on 29 July 2009. In May 2011, he was replaced by A. Navaneethakrishnan.

On 12 January 2024, he was once again appointed to the post, replacing R. Shunmugasundaram.

== Controversies ==
When senior politician Abhishek Manu Singhvi of the Indian National Congress withdrew from appearing on behalf of Megha Distributors, a lottery promotion agency challenging a lottery ban imposed by the Government of Kerala due to criticism from the Kerala state unit of the party, Raman took over the case. This action was severely criticized by the state cabinet and Chief Minister of Kerala V. S. Achuthanandan as well as senior Congress politician and Oommen Chandy. Eventually, at the advice of M. Karunanidhi, the Chief Minister of Tamil Nadu, Raman offered to withdraw from the case.
