= V. Sadagopacharlu =

Indian lawyer and politician

Vembaukum Sadagopacharlu (died 1863) was an Indian lawyer, jurist, banker, and statesman, who was the first native Indian member of the Madras Legislative Council, serving from 1861 to until his 1863 death, and one of the first Indians to achieve wealth and renown in the courts of British India, doing both alongside his brother, religious reformer and minor polymath V. Rajagopalacharlu, in the judicial system of the Madras Presidency, in which they were leading Vakils, he himself being the first Indian to become one. He belonged to the influential Vembaukum family.

== Early life ==
Sadagopacharlu hailed from the village of Vembakkam near Kanchipuram. He matriculated from the Presidency College, Madras in 1858 and studied law. Soon, he enrolled himself as a lawyer, and along with his reportedly "even more brilliant" brother V. Rajagopalacharlu, emerged as one of the first and foremost Indians in the bar making up a fortune in a short time. At a time when the typical remuneration of a lawyer of the Madras High Court was 10,000 rupees for participating in a case, his personal total compensation over the course of litigation over the adoption of an heir to the Ramnad estate, on which both he and his brother worked, was 150,000 rupees. The second published case in the Presidency was his, with John D. Mayne, Advocate-General of Madras and author of the standard reference text for the Hindu customary law of British India, Mayne's Hindu Law, as opposing counsel; he himself was the author of the standard reference text on Muslim customary law in India, despite only living to 35. His younger brother would also die prematurely, at 38, shortly after accidentally shooting and killing their sister's husband in 1878.

Sadagopacharlu married the sister of his paternal uncle's wife, and his nephew Sir V. C. Desikachariar's father-in-law took his deceased first wife's niece as his second wife, which facts were cited in the High Court as evidence as to the permissibility of such marriages in Hindu customary law for Brahmins, in relation to Iyengars as one of the orthodox Brahminical sects and Madras as one district of the Presidency's eight.

== Politics ==
Sadagopacharlu was nominated to the Madras Legislative Council in 1861 and served until his death in 1863. Gazulu Lakshminarasu Chetty was appointed to fill the seat left by his death.
