= V. Periyakaruppiah =

Indian judge

Vaiyapuri Periyakaruppiah

Judge(retired), Madras High Court
- In office 12 November 2007 – 4 October 2012

Personal details
- Born: October 1950 (age 75) Kamatchipuram, Theni District, Tamil Nadu; India
- Spouse: Vani Periyakaruppiah
- Children: Veena Suresh; Karthik Pranab Singh

Vaiyapuri Periyakaruppiah is a retired judge of the Madras High Court in India.

== Early life and career ==
Periyakaruppiah was born on 5 October 1950, at Kamatchipuram (Theni district), Tamil Nadu, India.

After receiving education at P.H.N. High School in Kamatchipuram, he completed his initial undergraduate degree course from the V.H.N.S.N. College in Virudhunagar. He later obtained a law degree from the Madras Law College in 1974. He got enrolled as an advocate in August 1974.

After practising in Madurai, he was directly appointed as a Subordinate-Judge in 1989. He has served in Villupuram, Thiruvallur, Chennai and Cuddalore under the Subordinate and District Judiciaries. He was also served in the administrative positions of the Madras High court as Registrar (Vigilance) for nearly three years and also was the first Registrar (Judicial) of the Madurai Bench of the Madras High Court.

Just before being promoted as a Judge in the High Court of Madras in November 2007, he served as the Principal Judge in the City Civil Court, Chennai.

His position as a judge in Madras High court was made permanent on 10 November 2009 after a brief swearing in ceremony.

After 23 years of service as a judge in the Indian judiciary, he retired from the service on 4 October 2012 and took over the charge as a judicial member in the Armed Forces Tribunal (Chennai bench).
