= Pullavakkam Gram Panchayat =

Village in Tamil Nadu, India

Pullavakkam Pulla vakkam
- Village Panchayat
- Location in Tamil Nadu, India Pullavakkam (India)
- Coordinates: 12.742433°N 79.499802°E
- Country: India
- State: Tamil Nadu
- District: Tiruvannamalai

Population (2011)
  - Total: 1,762

Languages
  - Official: Tamil
- Time zone: UTC+5:30 (IST)

Pullavakkam Village Panchayat (Pullavakkam Gram Panchayat), Vembakkam is located in Tiruvannamalai district of Tamil Nadu. This panchayat falls under Cheyyar Assembly Constituency and Aarani Lok Sabha constituency.This panchayat has a total of 7 panchayat constituencies. 7 Panchayat Council members are elected from these. According to the 2011 census of India, the total population is 1762. Among them 897 are females and 865 are males

== Basic facilities ==
The following information has been compiled according to the 2015 th data of the Tamil Nadu Rural Development and Panchayat Department.

| Basic Facilities | Total No. |
|---|---|
| Water Connection | 118 |
| Bore Motor Pump | 3 |
| Hand Pump | 8 |
| Upper level reservoir tanks | 4 |
| Ground level water tanks | |
| Local government buildings | 9 |
| Government school buildings | 3 |
| Ponds or Wells | 7 |
| Play Ground | |
| Markets | |
| Panchayat Union Roads | 31 |
| Panchayat roads | 1 |
| Bus Stand | |
| Graveyard or Incinerations | 3 |

== Small Villages ==
List of villages located in this panchayat:

1. Indra Nager
2. Pullavakam
3. Pootheri
