= Patrick O'Sullivan (lawyer) =

Patrick O' Sullivan

Advocate-General of Madras Presidency
- In office 1877–1882
- Preceded by: Sir H. S. Cunningham
- Succeeded by: Hale Horatio Shephard

Personal details
- Born: 20 January 1835
- Died: 25 February 1887 (aged 52)
- Occupation: lawyer
- Profession: Advocate-General

Patrick O' Sullivan (20 January 1835 – 25 February 1887) was a British lawyer of Irish origin who served as the Advocate-General of the Madras Presidency and ex-officio member of the Madras Legislative Council from 1877 to 1882.

He studied law at Gray's Inn and was called to the bar in 1864.

He married Sidney Jane Moore in India. They had only one son, Arthur, a British Army officer who played a leading role in the 1914 Christmas truce.
