= Sita Narasimhan =

Indian academic (born 1929)

Sita Narasimhan (15 June 1929 - 19 February 2013) was an Indian academic.

== Personal life ==
Narasimhan was born in Madras (Chennai), South India, the daughter of Padmini and V. K. Thiruvenkatachari, who was Advocate General of Madras State.

Sita Narasimhan was married to Professor R. Narasimhan (1926-2007), doyen of Indian Computer science, designer of India's first general purpose computer, first President of the Computer Society of India, who spent much of his working life at the Tata Institute of Fundamental Research. In 2011 with their daughter Tanjam Jacobson and Dr Krishna Bharat, Sita set up an endowment for memorial lectures at the TIFR in her husband's name.

Sita died at her daughter Tanjam Jacobson's home near Washington, D.C., 19 February 2013.

== Academic life ==
Sita Narasimhan studied at Newnham College, Cambridge from 1947 to 1950, studying first the Part II English Tripos and then the Part II Economics Tripos. She was the Dorothy Stevenson Scholar.

She became lecturer in English Literature at Miranda House in New Delhi, and at Presidency College, Madras.

She returned to Cambridge as a Commonwealth Scholar in 1960-61, moving to Victoria College in Toronto 1961-62.

She subsequently became Lecturer and Director of Studies in English Literature at Newnham College, Cambridge, from 1966 to 1979. She was the first woman of colour to be a Senior Member of Newnham College. At Newnham, one of Sita Narasimhan's students was Patricia Hewitt, the Labour politician now Chair of the UK India Business Council. Speaking about Sita, Hewitt was quoted in The Telegraph saying "I found myself in the extraordinary position of being a young Australian student, reading English literature at one of the oldest British universities, with a director of studies who was Indian — Sita Narasimhan was a wonderful scholar of English literature but also brought a very deep knowledge of Sanskrit."

She made an in depth study of Hindu religious texts. In 1983, she wrote a biographical essay on another iconic woman, "Joan Robinson: In the Radical Vein. A Laywoman's Homage", in the Cambridge Journal of Economics. Her published books include Saivism Under The Imperial Cholas as revealed through their Monuments. She had close connections with Mahatma Gandhi with whom she walked.

Among her publications was a translation of Talks by Vinoba Bhave on the Bhagavad Gita.
