= A. Navaneethakrishnan =

Indian politician and lawyer

Member of Parliament, Rajya Sabha
- In office 26 June 2014 – 10 June 2022
- Succeeded by: P. Chidambaram
- Constituency: Tamil Nadu

Advocate-General of Tamil Nadu
- In office 2011-2013
- Preceded by: P. S. Raman
- Succeeded by: A. L. Somayaji

Personal details
- Born: 18 May 1956 (age 70) Ponnappur West, Thanjavur district, Madras State, India
- Party: All India Anna Dravida Munnetra Kazhagam
- Spouse: N. Tamil Selvi
- Children: 2 sons and 1 daughter
- Education: Madras Law College

Appasamy Navaneethakrishnan is an Indian politician and lawyer. He is a Member of Parliament, representing Tamil Nadu in the Rajya Sabha the upper house of India's Parliament.He is the leader of the AIADMK party in the Rajya Sabha. He was the earlier the Advocate General of Tamil Nadu.He was the defence lawyer for Jayalalithaa in various corruption cases.
