= Vadamanappakkam =

- village
- Location in Tamil Nadu, India Vadamanappakkam (India)
- Coordinates: 12.766°N 79.503°E
- Country: India
- State: Tamil Nadu
- District: Tiruvannamalai

Population (2001)
  - Total: 6,000

Languages
  - Official: Tamil
- Time zone: UTC+5:30 (IST)
- PIN: 604402

Vadamanappakkam is a village located in the Tiruvannamalai district of Tamil Nadu, South India.

== Overview ==
Vadamanappakkam is a village located in the Southern Indian state of Tamil Nadu. It is located 20 miles (32 km) south of the temple city Kanchipuram and 50 mi north of the Christian Medical College & Hospital in the town of Vellore. Vadamanappakkam has a population of 5,000 people that live in a predominantly agrarian society with rice being the staple food. Irrigation and drinking water is primarily available from the water in wells and ponds, which are filled in the rainy season from October to January. The village is connected to other villages and towns through state highways.

It is administered as part of the Vembakkam taluk.

== History ==
The name "Vadamanappakkam" (Tamil: வடமணப்பாக்கம்) comes from "Vaadamalai Amman" located in Eshwaran Temple in the village.

== Education ==
Vadamanappakkam has an elementary school with 500 students and a high school with 700 students. The schools have a common playground with a dimension of 200 x 400 yards. The high school has a good record and each year, with more and more students getting high scores in public exams. Other students from nearby villages like Melbhudheri, Perumanthangal, Thandappanthangal, Moranam, and Thennampattu attend this school to shape their careers. Vadamanappakkam also has a library with many books and daily newspapers, providing a source for villagers to expand their knowledge.

== Economy ==
The main occupations of the people living in Vadamanappakkam are agriculture and weaving .

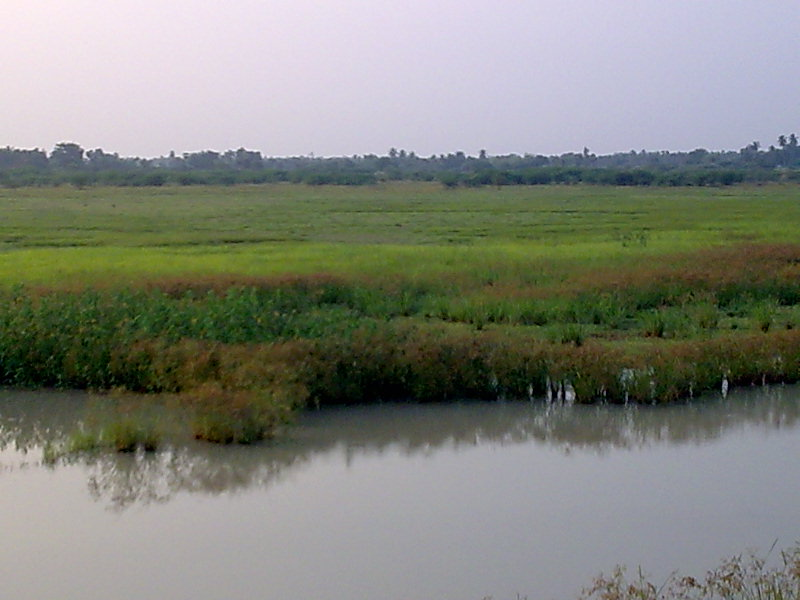
Agriculture lands

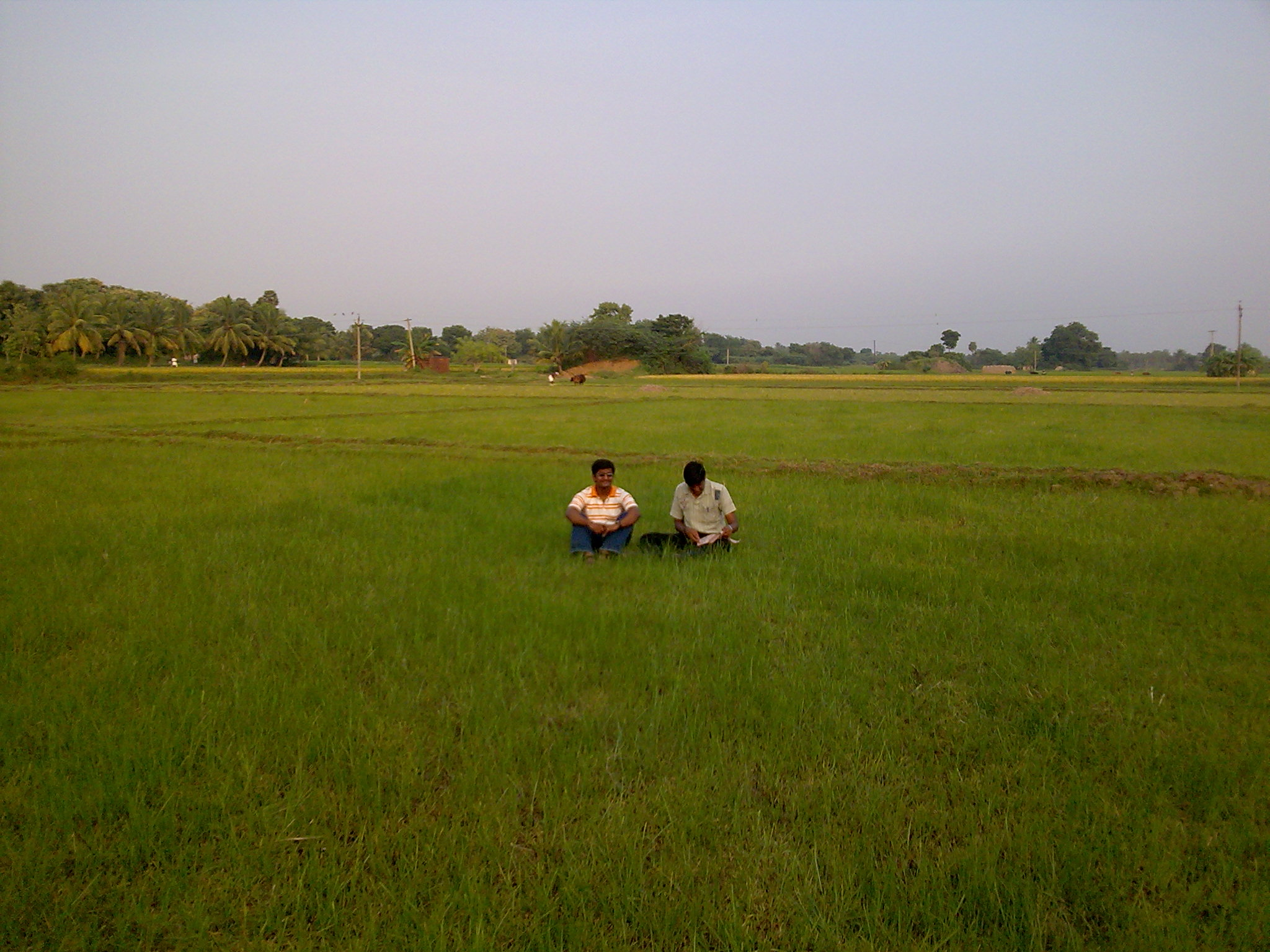
Agriculture lands

== Culture ==
Festivals are a common form of celebration in the village.

- The Pongal festival is celebrated with unity these days. Most of the people come to native and celebrate the festivals. On the day of Mattu Pongal after Pooja, people travel around the village using bullock carts. They also sing works like "Ponga Lo Pongal Mattu Pongal".
- Deepavali is also celebrated in the village.
- Every year on the 4th Sunday of the Tamil month Thai, they celebrate a festival for Thanthondri Amman. On that day, people in the community gather and they prepare Pongal and perform their Poojas to Amman. In the evening, they do Madu Pidi. The highlight of that day is Amman Thiruveethi Ulla, because most of the people in this village have Viratham and do the Nerthikadan while this time, like people, had Manda Village, Kaan Imai Sathutha, because people accept that Amman is powerful.
- An important festival that happens at the Subramaniya Swami Temple is Soorasamharam. In recent times, this festival is celebrated once every 2 years. This festival lasts for 3 days, and the 3rd day of this festival occurs on Kantha Sasti day. The residents participate in several programs such as Kattakatti Vedam for attacking the Murugan.
- Kumbhabhishekham is done in Earikarai Amman Kovil each year during the Tamil month of Aadi.
- Krishna Janmashtami is celebrated at Krishnar Kovil (Venugopal Swami) on Yadava Street, as well as surrounding streets in the village. During that day, the Uri Adi function is also done on Yadava Street.
- Vinayaka Chathurthi is celebrated at Vallampuri Vinayaga Temple on Yadava Street as well as some other temples in the village.

Tanks are part of an ancient tradition of harvesting and preserving the local rainfall and water from streams and rivers for later use, primarily for agriculture and drinking water, but also for sacred bathing and rituals. Often a tank was constructed across a slope so to collect and store water by taking advantage of local mounds and depressions. Tank use is critical, especially in parts of South India without perennial rainfall where water supply replenishment is dependent on a cycle of dry seasons alternating with monsoon seasons.

== Transport ==
Vadamanappakkam can be reached by bus from Chennai via Kanchipuram to Kalavi Road. Vadamanappakkam is 15 km from Cheyyar, 27 km away from Kanchipuram, and 27 km away from Arcot. It is located 60 km from the Katpadi railway junction. All trains from Chennai to Coimbatore, Bangalore, and Trivandrum go by this route only.
