= V. C. Desikachariar =

Indian independence activist, lawyer, and politician

Sir Vembakkam Comanduru Desikachariar (31 December 1861 – 14 November 1919) was an Indian lawyer, politician and Indian independence activist who served as a member of the Madras Legislative Council from 1904 to 1908.

Desikachariar also participated in the 1898 Madras session of the Indian National Congress and introduced resolutions. He was the elder son of V. Rajagopalacharlu, brother to V. C. Seshachariar, the nephew of V. Sadagopacharlu, and the father of V. C. Gopalratnam, and a member of the Vembaukum family. According to Gopalratnam, he was from 1891 a leader of the Madras bar, alongside C. R. Pattabhirama Iyer, M. O. Parthasarathy Iyengar, V. Krishnaswamy Iyer, P. R. Sundaram Iyer, and Sir C. Sankaran Nair, immediately behind Sir V. Bhashyam Aiyangar and Sir S. Subramania Iyer. He apprenticed alongside his brother and S. Srinivasa Iyengar with relative Sir V. Bhashyam Aiyangar, who was father-in-law to the third of them. He was knighted in 1906.
