= Sivasankar Natarajan =

Indian judge

Judge of the Supreme Court of India
- In office 10 March 1986 – 28 October 1989

Personal details
- Born: October 29, 1924 Salem, Madras Presidency, British India
- Died: April 11, 2014
- Education: Loyola College, Chennai; Madras Law College
- Profession: Lawyer, Judge

Sivasankar Natarajan (29 October 1924 –11 April 2014) was an Indian judge and former Judge of the Supreme Court of India.

== Career ==
Natarajan was born in 1924 in Salem, Madras Presidency. He completed his study at Municipal High School in Salem. He passed from Loyola College. Natarajan subsequently completed his legal education at Madras Law College and enrolled as an advocate in the Madras High Court on 4 August 1947. He practice in civil, criminal, taxation and industrial matters. In 1959, he was appointed Public Prosecutor for Salem district. Later he entered into the judicial service, and promoted to the District and Sessions Judge in 1971. Natarajan was elevated as a Judge of Madras High Court on 15 February 1973. On 10 March 1986, he was appointed as a Judge of the Supreme Court of India.
