= V. P. Raman =

Indian lawyer and politician (1932–1991)

Venkata Pattabhi Raman

Advocate-General of Tamil Nadu
- In office 1977–1979
- Preceded by: K. Parasaran

Personal details
- Born: 3 October 1932 Madras, Madras Presidency, British India, Tamil Nadu, India
- Died: 2 December 1991 (aged 59) Chennai, Tamil Nadu, India
- Party: Dravida Munnetra Kazhagam
- Spouse: kalpakam Raman
- Children: Mohan V. Ram, P. S. Raman, P. R. Raman,
- Education: Loyola College, Madras, Madras Law College
- Occupation: lawyer
- Profession: Advocate-General

Venkata Pattabhi Raman (3 October 1932 – 2 December 1991) was an Indian lawyer and politician who served as the Advocate-General of Tamil Nadu from 1977 to 1979. His son Mohan Raman is an actor.

== Early life and education ==
Raman was born on 3 October 1932 in Madras and had his schooling at Church Park. On completion of his schooling, Raman graduated in Physics from Loyola College and studied law at Madras Law College completing his studies with a gold medal.

== Politics ==
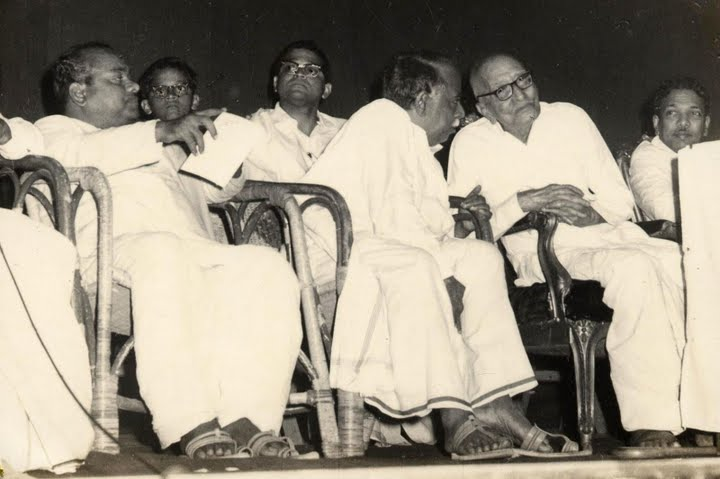
V. P. Raman, third from left (in the back row behind Annadurai)

Initially, Raman was attracted towards Communism. Later, however, he joined the fledgling Dravida Munnetra Kazhagam. Mr Raman was part of the committee that framed the DMK’s constitution and stood by the party in its formative years. This was confirmed by [Mr M.K. Stalin], the Chief of the DMK in a public address in 2022
