= H. S. Cunningham =

British lawyer and writer (1832–1920)

Sir Henry Stewart Cunningham
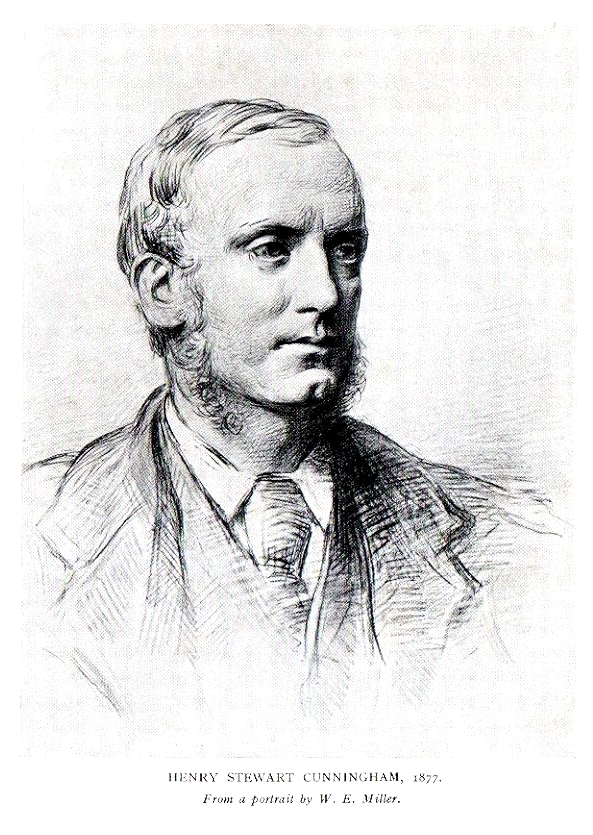
- H. S. Cunningham, 1877 drawing

Advocate-General of Madras Presidency
- In office 1872–1877
- Preceded by: John D. Mayne
- Succeeded by: Patrick O'Sullivan

Personal details
- Born: 30 June 1832 Harrow, London
- Died: 3 September 1920 (aged 88) London, England
- Children: 1
- Education: Harrow, Trinity College, Oxford
- Occupation: lawyer
- Profession: Advocate-General

Sir Henry Stewart Cunningham KCIE (30 June 1832 – 3 September 1920) was a British lawyer and writer who served as the Advocate-General of Madras Presidency from 1872 to 1877.

== Early life and education ==
He was born in 1832 to Rev. John William Cunningham, and his second wife Mary Calvert, the third child of the marriage. His father was vicar of Harrow; he was caricatured in the novel The Vicar of Wrexhill by Frances Trollope, one of his parishioners. His mother was a daughter of Harry Calvert, and wished him to go into the Church of England.

Brought up in an evangelical vicarage, Cunningham was first sent to the school of the Rev. George Renaud at Bayford House. He was then educated from 1845 at Harrow School, and matriculated in 1851 at Trinity College, Oxford, graduating B.A. in 1856 and M.A. in 1860. He was called to the bar in 1859 at the Inner Temple.

== Career ==
Cunningham practised in the United Kingdom and in British India and rose to become Advocate-General of the Madras Presidency in 1872. In 1877, he was appointed judge of the Calcutta High Court and served from 1877 to 1887. In 1878, he was appointed member of the Indian Famine Commission to look into the causes of the Great Famine of 1876–78.

== Death ==
He was made a Knight Commander of the Order of the Indian Empire on 1 January 1889. Cunningham died in 1920.

== Works ==
- Wheat and Tares (1861). Partly a roman à clef about the evangelical lifestyle, it was noted as containing portrayals of Cunningham's uncle the Rev. Francis Cunningham (1785–1863), and his wife Richenda Gurney. Anonymous. It was first published in Fraser's Magazine.
- Late Laurels (1864, 2 vols.), novel. Anonymous, "By the author of Wheat and Tares". First published in Fraser's Magazine from 1863.
- The Chronicles of Dustypore, a Tale of Modern Anglo-Indian Society (1875, 2 vols.) This novel and The Coeruleans: a Vacation Idyll (1887) describe the European society of the British Raj. Anonymous.
- The Heriots (1890). A fashionable novel of British society.
- Earl Canning (1891). Biography of Charles Canning, 1st Earl Canning.

== Family ==
Cunningham, on furlough in the United Kingdom, married in 1877 Harriett Emily Lawrence, second daughter of John Lawrence, 1st Baron Lawrence. They had a son and a daughter.

- Lawrence Henry Cunningham (1878–1909), married in 1905 Alice Maude Cooper, daughter of Charles Cooper of Armadale, Auckland, New Zealand.
- Mary Hermione (1887–1945), married in 1927 Sir Herbert Stephen, 2nd Baronet (1857–1932). Stephen's mother Mary Richenda Cunningham was a sister of Henry Stewart Cunningham, a daughter of John William Cunningham by his second wife, making this a first cousin marriage.
