= V. Rajagopalacharlu =

Indian lawyer, jurist, and Hindu religious reformer

V. Rajagopalacharlu (1830–1868) was an Indian lawyer, jurist, and Hindu religious reformer, who was one of the first Indians in the colonial epoch to achieve wealth and renown in the courts of British India, accomplishing both alongside his brother, V. Sadagopacharlu, in the judicial system of the Madras Presidency, in which they were leading Vakils. He also was an advocate of religious reform within Hinduism, as the primary exponent of the Brahmo Samaj movement in South India.

== Career ==
The brothers practiced before the appellate Sudder Court and its cassation court, the Supreme Court, operated in civil matters by the British East India Company under the aegis and authority of the Mughal emperors, and administering customary law in both Hindu and Muslim varieties, as selected and interpreted by learned Brahmin Pandits and Ulema known as Maulvis respectively, and decided by British judicial officers they instructed accordingly, referring in the former case to Dharmaśāstric canons pursuant to the commentary and supercommentary of Jīmūtavāhana's Dāyabhāga Nyāyika school of law, observed in Bengal, and Vijñāneśvara's Mitākṣarā Mīmāṃsāka school of law, which prevailed everywhere else. The latter took as authoritative Hanafi jurisprudence. Legal advocacy of Vakils and Barristers, and the same bodies of law, were preserved in the succeeding High Court of Madras after the 1857 Indian rebellion resulted in Parliament's supersession and dissolution of the Company, with it enacting the Indian High Courts Act 1861 and Queen Victoria accordingly creating the new High Court the following year. Both brothers, members of the Vembaukum family, which had first risen to prominence in the early nineteenth century with the dubash, grain merchant, and shipowner V. Krishna Aiyar, were associated with zamindari litigation, including that of the 2,351-square-mile Estate of Ramnad, a former kingdom with more than half a million tenants and almost 800,000 rupees in revenues. In the courts, Ramnad secured the transmitting of its succession by adoption, frustrating application of the Doctrine of lapse, with Sadagopacharlu earning 150,000 rupees through the process, at a time when the typical remuneration for a High Court lawyer involved in a case was 10,000 rupees. Of the two, Rajagopalacharlu was reported to be "even more brilliant" than his brother, and was noted as an authority on and occasional composer of Carnatic music, and as a skilled hypnotist, photographer and marksman.

He had two sons, who followed him and their uncle into law, apprenticing with their celebrated cousin Sir V. Bhashyam Aiyangar: Sir V. C. Desikachariar, father to lawyer and legal historian V. C Gopalratnam, and V. C. Seshachariar, founder and editor of the legal publication Law Weekly, which is still published by the Vembaukum family. One of the most storied of the Vembaukum family mansions in Mylapore, within the city of Madras, was Vasantha Vilas ("Abode of Spring"), which he built to supply agricultural laborers with work during a time of extreme drought, the Great Famine of 1876–1878, under a relief scheme enacted by the Presidency. His widow and sons relocated to the mansion after Rajagopacharlu's death in 1878 at the age of thirty-eight, reportedly from despair, three months after accidentally shooting and killing his brother-in-law as the two of them hunted near Vembakkam lake. Certain of his creditors mistakenly pursued the Brahmo Samaj for his debts, believing it to be the recipient of personal funds invested by him, which caused some trouble for the organization. Sadagopacharlu had also died young, earlier in the decade, at thirty-five, in 1863.
