= N. Krishnaswami Reddy =

Advocate General of Madras State
- In office 1964–1966
- Preceded by: V. K. Thiruvenkatachari
- Succeeded by: Mohan Kumaramangalam

Personal details
- Born: 1913
- Died: 7 December 2002 (age 89)

N. Krishnaswami Reddy (c. 1913 - 7 December 2002) was an Indian lawyer who served as Advocate-General of Madras State from 1964 to 1966 and later, as a judge of the Madras High Court.

== Early life ==
Born in Reddypalayam in 1913, Krishnaswami Reddy was educated at the St. Columbus High School, Chingleput and the Madras Christian College. Upon graduating in law from the Madras Law College, Krishnaswami Reddy enrolled as an advocate of the Madras High Court on 11 December 1939.

== Career ==
Krishnaswami Reddy practised as a lawyer in the Madras High Court and the subordinate courts at Chingleput till December 1960, when he was appointed public prosecutor at the Madras High Court. In 1964, he was appointed Advocate-General of Madras State and served till 8 July 1966, when he was controversially appointed to the bench of the High Court.

== Death ==
Krishnaswami Reddy died on 7 December 2002.
