= Thomas Sydney Smith =

Advocate-General of Madras Presidency
- In office 1861–1863
- Succeeded by: John Bruce Norton

Personal details
- Occupation: lawyer
- Profession: Advocate-General

Thomas Sydney Smith was an Indian lawyer who served as the Advocate General of Madras Presidency (now known as Tamil Nadu, India) from 1861 to 1863. He was ex-officio a member of the Madras Legislative Council.
