= Ambujammal =

Indian linguist

- அம்புஜத்தம்மாள்

Vice-President of the Tamil Nadu Congress Committee
- In office 1957–1962
- President: K. Rajaram Naidu (1957–1960); O. V. Alagesan (1960–1962)
- Preceded by: ????
- Succeeded by: ????

Personal details
- Born: 8 January 1899 Madras, Madras Presidency, British India (now Chennai, Tamil Nadu, India)
- Died: 1981 or 6 October 1983 (aged 82 or 84)
- Party: Indian National Congress └─ Tamil Nadu Congress Committee
- Spouse: S. Desikachari
- Relations: V. Bhashyam Aiyangar (maternal grandfather)
- Parent(s): Ranganayaki (mother); S. Srinivasa Iyengar (father)
- Occupation: Indian freedom fighter, social worker

Ambujammal Desikachari née Srinivasa Iyengar (8 January 1899–1983) was an Indian independence activist and women's rights activist. A Gandhian, she participated in the Civil Disobedience Movement and served as vice-president of the Tamil Nadu Congress Committee. Ambujammal was awarded the Padma Shri in 1964.

== Early life and education ==
Ambujammal was born on 8 January 1899 to S. Srinivasa Iyengar and his wife Ranganayaki. Srinivasa Iyengar was one of the foremost leaders of the Indian National Congress in the Madras Presidency and had served as the President of the Swaraj Party. Ambujammal's maternal grandfather was Sir V. Bhashyam Aiyangar, the first native Indian to be appointed the Advocate-General of Madras. Ambujammal married S. Desikachari, an advocate from Kumbakonam, in 1910.

Early on in her life, she was fascinated by Mahatma Gandhi's ideas, especially his constructive socio-economic program. This interest was fanned by her contact with Sister Subbalakshmi, Dr. Muthulakshmi Reddy, and Margaret Cousins. Ambujammal qualified as a teacher and taught at Sarada Vidyalaya girls school part-time. She was a committee member of Sarada Ladies' Union from 1929 to 1936. She worked very closely with Sister Subbalakshmi. In 1929, she was nominated Treasurer of the Women's Swadeshi League, Madras. This League was a non-political wing of the Congress, implementing Gandhi's social and economic programs.

== Career and political activism ==
Her entry into political life was in 1930, during the civil disobedience movement. She joined with several women who donated their jewelry to support the national movement – on Gandhi's request. She was a strong proponent of Swadeshi, and embraced Khadi. She joined the Salt Satyagraha, and courted arrest. In 1932, she was hailed as the "Third Dictator" of the Congress, and led the Satyagrahis to boycott foreign cloth.

A thorough Congresswoman, she was part of the Managing Committee of the Dakshina Bharat Hindi Prachar Sabha from 1934 to 1938. She did a lot of propaganda work for Hindi. As part of her activities with the Hindi Prachar Sabha, she attended the All-India Congress Session in Bombay in 1934. She stayed at Wardha Ashram with Gandhi from November 1934 till January 1935. As part of the role as Secretary of the Mylapore Ladies Club (a post she held from 1936), she conducted Hindi classes.

She was a significant part of the Women's India Association (WIA), taking the post of Secretary from 1939 to 1942 and that of Treasurer from 1939 to 1947. With the WIA, the issues she worked were abolition of child marriage, polygamy, and the Devadasi system; and bringing about legislation to protect the rights of women and their property rights. On behalf of the WIA, she was nominated to the Madras Corporation. In 1947, during the All-India Women's Conference in Madras, she was nominated as the chairperson of the reception committee. A dedicated social worker, she was the President and Treasurer of the Srinivasa Gandhi Nilayam from 1948, an institute she founded. It provided free coaching to poor girls, had a free dispensary, and also provided training and employment to women in its printing press. An associate of Vinoba Bhave, Ambujammal toured Madras Province with him to publicize the Bhoodan movement in 1956. She was not in favour of too much industrialization; she believed in the Village Self-Sufficiency model – as advocated by Bhave. She was the vice-president of the Tamil Nadu Congress Committee from 1957 to 1962, and the chairman of the State Social Welfare Board from 1957 to 1964.

== Contribution ==
Ambujammal actively participated in the Non-Cooperation Movement and boycotted foreign goods and clothes — she was even imprisoned twice for six months in 1932. She dedicated her life to the cause of India's freedom and inspired several women to do the same. Women's welfare was at the top of her agenda. She set up the Srinivasa Gandhi Nilayam in 1948 at Teynampet where free milk, medicines and kanji (gruel) were given to the needy. Ambujammal was known for her simplicity. Akkamma, as she was lovingly called, dressed in khadi and wore nothing but a strand of beads around her neck.

Alongside that, she also helped especially in supporting the Mahila Ashram, a school for women that helped to teach Self-Respect through education. She helped support the cause alongside Gandhi (whose ideas were being taught there) by donating much of her jewelry.

She was a scholar in Hindi and Tamil. She wrote three books about Gandhi in Tamil. In 1964, she won the Padma Shri award.

== In popular culture ==
Ambujammal is the real-life inspiration for the character of Komalammal—an ashram operator and daughter of the Gandhian Sadagopa Iyengar—in Ashokamitran's novel Manasarovar (1989).
