= Tamil Nadu Dr. Ambedkar Law University =

Public state university in Chennai, India

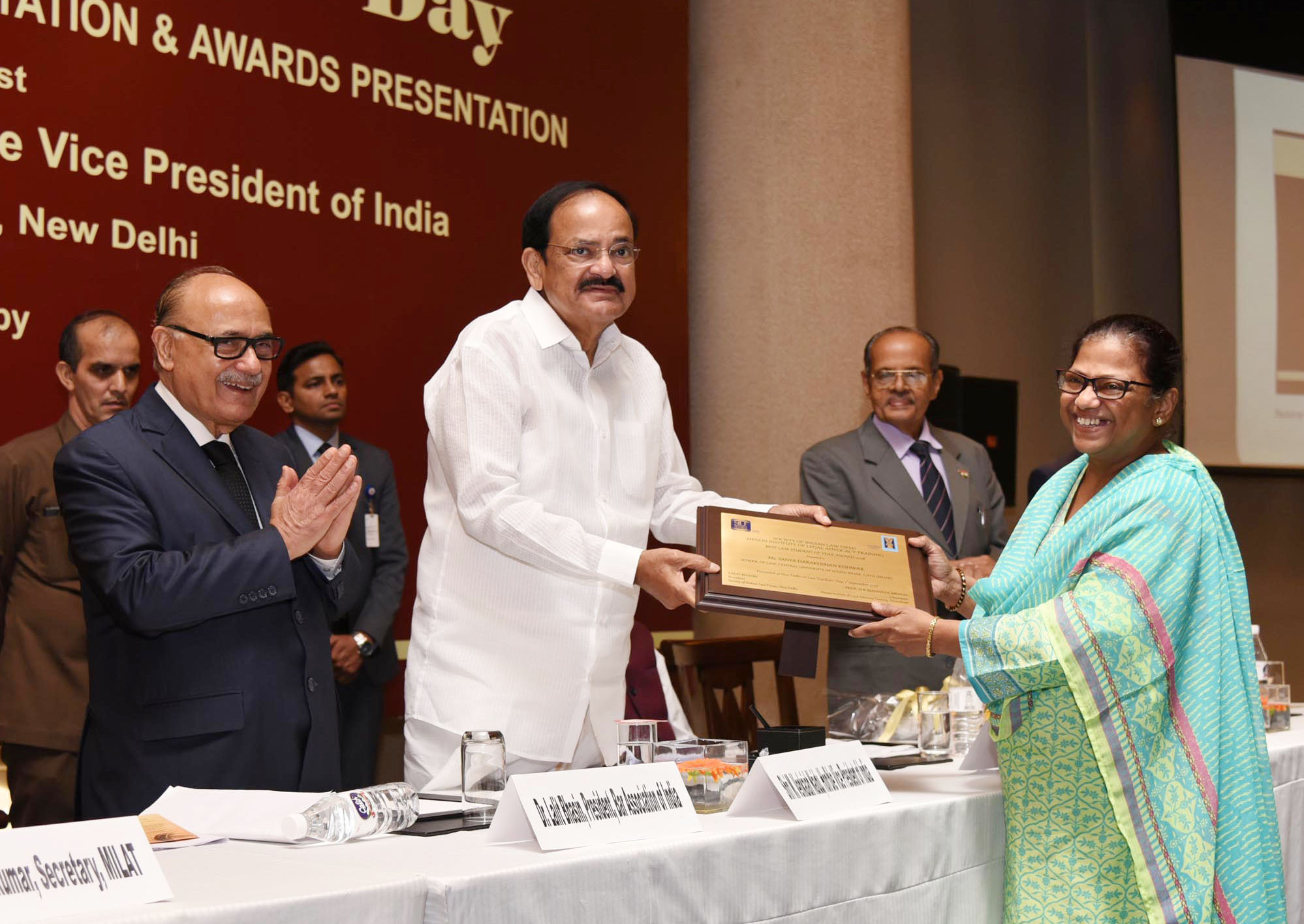
- M. Venkaiah Naidu presenting the Best Law Student Award 2018 to Ms. Bhargavi Kannan, School of Excellence, Ambedkar University, Chennai
- Motto: Lex Supremus
- Motto in English: Law is Supreme
- Type: Public
- Established: 1997; 29 years ago
- Affiliations: UGC, AIU, ACU and IIPA
- Chancellor: Governor of Tamil Nadu
- Vice-Chancellor: Vacant
- Faculty: 50
- Students: 3499
- Undergraduates: 2765
- Postgraduates: 734
- Location: Chennai, Tamil Nadu, India; 13°0′59.92″N 80°15′50.33″E
- Campus: Urban
- Website: tndalu.ac.in

Tamil Nadu Dr. Ambedkar Law University (TNDALU) is a public state university established in 1997 at Chennai, India by the Government of Tamil Nadu under The Tamil Nadu Dr. Ambedkar Law University Act, 1996, which also brought all law colleges in Tamil Nadu under the control of the university. It was named after B. R. Ambedkar, an Indian jurist, social reformer and the architect of the Constitution of India. The university was inaugurated on 20 September 1997 by K. R. Narayanan, former president of India. The university started a law school on its own campus in 2002 as the School of Excellence in Law, Chennai (SOEL).

== Academics ==
At the undergraduate level, SOEL has a three-year course leading to a Bachelor of Laws (LL.B.), and five-year integrated double-degree courses leading to a combination between a LL.B. and a Bachelor of Arts, Bachelor of Computing, Bachelor of Business Administration, or Bachelor of Computer Application.

The Postgraduate Department provides Master of Laws degrees across nine different branches.

== Campus ==
Chief minister J. Jayalalithaa in February 2016 unveiled a state-of-the-art campus for the Tamil Nadu Dr Ambedkar Law University at Perungudi next to Taramani MRTS station. The new campus has separate blocks for administration and classes, besides a library at a cost of 59.27 crore. The CM opened the facility through video conferencing from her chamber at the Secretariat. The campus also has hostel facilities for girls and a playground with gallery.

== Affiliated colleges ==
=== Government law colleges ===
College Name	Location	District	Established
Dr. Ambedkar Government Law College, Chennai	Chennai	Chennai	1891
Government Law College, Madurai	Madurai	Madurai	1974-1975
Government Law College, Coimbatore	Coimbatore	Coimbatore	1978-1980
Government Law College, Tiruchirapalli	Tiruchirapalli	Tiruchirappalli	1978-1980
Government Law College, Tirunelveli	Tirunelveli	Tirunelveli	1996-1997
Government Law College, Chengalpattu	Chengalpattu	Chennai	2006-2007
Government Law College, Vellore	Katpadi	Vellore	2008-2009
Government Law College, Dharmapuri	Dharmapuri	Vellore	2017-2018
Government Law College, Villupuram	Villupuram	Villupuram	2017-2018

=== Private law colleges ===
No.	College name	Location	District	Established
1	Central Law College, Salem	Salem	Salem	1984
