= Nanoo Pillai =

Indian civil servant and administrator

M. R. Ry. Dewan Nanoo Pillai of Neyyoor

Diwan of Travancore
- In office 1877–1880
- Monarch: Ayilyam Thirunal
- Preceded by: Sir A. Seshayya Sastri
- Succeeded by: V. Ramiengar

Personal details
- Born: 1827 Neyyoor, Travancore
- Died: 1886 (aged 58–59) Travancore

M. R. Ry. Dewan Nanoo Pillai (1827–1886) was a Travancorean statesman who served as the Diwan of Travancore from 1877 to 1880.

== Early life ==
Nanoo Pillai was born in a Nair family of Neyyoor village of Travancore in 1827 as the son of Mekkottu Kariyavila Veettil Nagan Thampy and Easwari Pillai. He was educated privately had his English schooling at the London Missionary Society seminary in Nagercoil. While young, he caught the attention of General Cullen, the English Resident. He volunteered to work for the General as a translator and later as a secretary in the Resident's office.

== Civil service ==
After serving for 14 years in the Resident's office, Nanoo Pillai joined the Travancore service as Assistant Sheristadar. With a strong recommendation from the then Diwan, Sir T. Madhava Rao, Nanoo Pillai was promoted to be Dewan Peishkar of the Southern Division. He was soon transferred to the Travancore division and officiated as the Dewan in Madhava Rao's absence on six occasions and was eventually appointed as the Diwan on the retirement of Seshayya Sastri in August 1877.

== As Diwan ==
As Diwan of Travancore, Nanoo Pillai brought reforms in the Revenue Settlement introducing the transfer of registries. He also brought measures for irrigating the Southern Division and formulated the Kothayar Project before retiring in 1880.

== Biographies ==
- K. R. Elenkath (1974). Dewan Nanoo Pillay: biography with his select writings and letters. Dewan Nanoo Pillay Memorial Reading Room, West Neyyoor.
