= R. Shunmugasundaram =

Advocate-General of Tamil Nadu
- Incumbent
- Assumed office 2021
- Preceded by: Vijay Narayan

Member of Parliament, Rajya Sabha
- In office 2002-2008
- Constituency: Tamil Nadu

Personal details
- Born: 29 October 1953 (age 72)
- Party: Dravida Munnetra Kazhagam

Rajagopal Shunmugasundaram is the Advocate General of Tamil Nadu. He was a Member of the Parliament of India for the Dravida Munnetra Kazhagam party representing Tamil Nadu in the Rajya Sabha, the upper house of the Indian Parliament. He also has experience as a public prosecutor when he worked from 1996 to 2001 as the Public Prosecutor of Tamil Nadu. He was attacked on May 30, 1995 when he was going to file a corruption case against Jayalalithaa."Welding" Kumar and 6 others were convicted for the attack.
