= K. Rajah Iyer =

Advocate General, Madras Presidency
- In office 1945–1950
- Preceded by: P. V. Rajamannar
- Succeeded by: V. K. Thiruvenkatachari

Personal details
- Born: 15 July 1890
- Died: 18 February 1974 (aged 83)

K. Rajah Iyer (15 July 1890 – 18 February 1974) was an Indian lawyer of the Madras High Court who served as Advocate-General of Madras Presidency from July 1945 to 1950. He was educated at the Presidency College, Madras. Rajah Iyer was on the bench when the Lakshmikanthan Murder Case trial took place.
