= Hale Horatio Shephard =

British lawyer and politician (1842-1921)

Sir Horatio Hale Shephard (1842 – 19 April 1921) was a British lawyer who served as the Advocate-General of the Madras Presidency in 1885 and acted as Chief Justice of the Madras High Court in 1898.

== Early and family life ==
Horatio Hale Shephard was the son of John Shephard and Harriett Strachey Harper Shephard. Harriett Harper Shephard was a daughter of Tristram Harper and Mary Jellicoe Harper, sister of Henry John Chitty Harper, and a great-great-granddaughter of John Strachey. Horatio H. Shephard educated at Eton and Balliol College, Oxford. He studied law at the Inner Temple and was called to the bar in 1867.

== Career ==
Shephard entered the India service as a barrister at the India Office in 1867. He was appointed Professor of law at the Presidency College, Madras in October 1873 and in 1881, was made a fellow of the Madras University. In March 1885, he was appointed Advocate General of the Madras Presidency and thereby a member of the Madras Legislative Council.

In January 1888, he was appointed officiating judge of the Madras High Court and confirmed in July 1889. He also officiated as the Chief Justice of the Madras High Court in 1898, before retiring in July 1901.

In April 1902 he was appointed a legal adviser and solicitor to the Secretary of State for India.

He was knighted in 1908.

Shephard died on 19 April 1921 at Biarritz.

== Family ==
Shephard married, in 1876, Agnes Rideout, daughter of Major-General J. W. Rideout. Their second son, Gordon Strachey Shephard, rose to the rank of brigadier-general, but was killed in World War I.
