= C. V. Rungacharlu =

Indian civil servant and administrator (1831–1883)

Chettipunyam Veeravalli Rungacharlu CIE
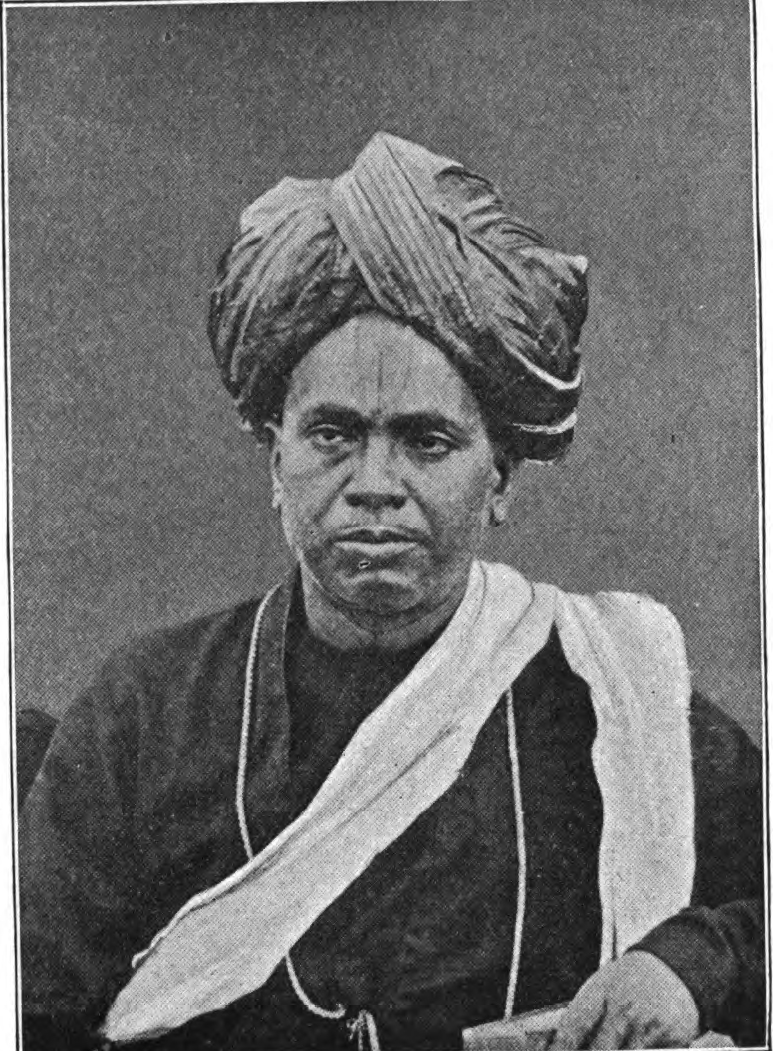

14th Dewan of Mysore
- In office 1881–1883
- Monarch: Chamaraja Wadiyar X
- Preceded by: Long vacant (after Arunachala Mudaliar's term in 1866)
- Succeeded by: Sir K. Seshadri Iyer

Personal details
- Born: August 1831 Chingleput district, Madras Presidency, British India
- Died: 20 January 1883 (aged 51) Madras, British India
- Profession: administrator

Chettipunyam Veeravalli Rungacharlu CIE (c. August 1831 - d. 20 January 1883), also spelt Rangacharlu, was an Indian civil servant and administrator who served as the 14th Dewan of Mysore from 1881 to 1883.

== Early life ==
Rungacharlu was born in Chingleput district, Madras Presidency, in a Vadagalai Iyengar family. His father, C. Raghavachariar, was a clerk in the Chingleput Collectorate. Rungacharlu's parents were poor. It was only after V. Raghavachariar, the Deputy Superintendent of Police in Madras, and member of the wealthy Vembaukum family into which he would marry, promised to support him financially that Rungacharlu was able to pursue his schooling at Madras. As a child, Rungacharlu developed a passion for chess.

Rungacharlu had his schooling at Pachaiyappa's School and the Madras High School, passing his proficient's test in 1849 in first class. Immediately upon matriculating, R.S. Ellis appointed him as a clerk in the Madras Collectorate.

He married the elder sister of V. Bhashyam Aiyangar.

== Early career ==
Rungacharlu began his career as an acting clerk in the Madras Collectorate on a salary of rupees fourteen per month. His first appointment was that of Assistant Munshi (Clerk). On confirmation, he was transferred to the Chingleput Collectorate and was soon promoted to Head Writer and put up in Salem. Rungacharlu performed well as a Head Writer and published two pamphlets: Bribery and Corruption in the Revenue Department and Mirasi Rights in the Chingleput and Tanjore Districts. Soon, he was appointed tahsildar of Saidapet, followed by head sheristadar of Nellore. In 1859, he was appointed Special Assistant to G. N. Taylor, President of the Imam Commission. When the commission came to an end, Rungacharlu was appointed to inquire the workings of the British Indian Railways. Rungacharlu's performance in the commission won him rich accolades; upon returning to Madras, he was appointed Commissioner of the Madras Railway Company. He was serving as Treasury Deputy Collector at Calicut in 1868 when he was invited to join the Mysore civil service.

== In the Mysore service ==
Rungacharlu moved to Mysore in 1868 to take over as the Comptroller of Mysore Palace. As comptroller, he wrote a pamphlet titled The British Administration of Mysore which was published in London in 1874. Soon after, Sir James Gordon, the Commissioner of Mysore, appointed Rungacharlu as his Revenue Secretary. As Revenue Secretary, Rungacharlu revamped the entire team of Commissioners and Deputy Commissioners: he substituted efficient Indians on moderate pay for inefficient Europeans drawing high salaries. As a result, state expenditure during the first year of his service (1879-1880) was reduced by one and a half lakh ruppes. In appreciation of his services, Rungacharlu was made a Companion of the Order of the Indian Empire in the year 1880.

At about this time, an inquiry was launched into the disappearance of certain jewels from the royal household when Rungacharlu was the Palace Comptroller. After a detailed enquiry, the disappearance of the jewels was attributed to a clerical error and Rungacharlu was absolved of all the accusations. He was eventually appointed Dewan of Mysore on 25 March 1881.

== Dewan of Mysore ==
When Rungacharlu took over as Dewan in March 1881, Mysore was in a poor financial, agricultural, and industrial condition. The kingdom was devastated by the famine of 1877 and faced with a debt of eight lakh rupees.

Soon after Rungacharlu took over as Dewan, he disbanded Hassan and Chitradurga districts and downgraded nine taluks into deputy amildar sections. The number of munsiff courts, sub-courts, and district jails were also reduced. These measures caused a drastic reduction in the expenses of the kingdom. He also lifted the ban of the sale of sandalwood and sandalwood products. With the revenue generated by the sale of sandalwood, Rungacharlu developed an elaborate railway system for the princely state. He constructed a railway line from Bangalore to Tiptur and established the Mysore Representative Assembly, the first representative body in an Indian princely state.

== Death ==
Rungacharlu fell seriously ill at the end of 1882. When the illness became critical, Rungacharlu resigned as Dewan. He was moved to Madras where he died on 20 January 1883.

== Other biographies ==
- Royaloo Chetty, T. (1909). A Brief Sketch of the Life of T. R. A. Thumboo Chetty, C.I.E, Formerly Chief Judge and Officiating Dewan of Mysore. Hoe & Co.Madras.
- D V Gundappa (1911). Diwan Rangacharlu.
- N. S. Chandrasekhara (1968). Dewan Rangacharlu: Builders of modern India. Publications Division, Ministry of Information and Broadcasting, Govt. of India.
