= Kamatchipuram =

- Village
- Location in Tamil Nadu, India
- Coordinates: 9°51′54″N 77°27′14″E
- Country: India
- State: Tamil Nadu
- District: Theni

Area
  - Total: 7.182 km^{2} (2.773 sq mi)

Population (2011)
  - Total: 3,253
  - Density: 452.9/km^{2} (1,173/sq mi)

Languages
  - Official: Tamil
- Time zone: UTC+5:30 (IST)
- PIN: 626520
- Telephone code: 04546
- Vehicle registration: TN-
- Coastline: 0 kilometres (0 mi)
- Nearest city: Madurai
- Lok Sabha constituency: Theni constituency
- Climate: Windy (Köppen)
- Sex ratio: .946 ♂/♀

Kamatchipuram is a small village in Tamil Nadu, India and falls under village panchayat administrative unit of Chinnamanur block in Uthamapalayam taluk, Theni district.

== Geography ==
The nearby villages are Seepalakkottai, Veppampatti, Poomalaikkundu, Azhakapuri, Kallapatti, Erakkottaipatti.

== Demography ==
There are many communities such as Nadar, Adi Dravida, Arundhathiyar, Chettiyar, Asari and caste less people also.

== Educational institutions ==
1. Pachaiyappa Hindu Nadar Primary School.
2. Patchaiyappa Hindu Nadar Higher Secondary School.
3. Mariyappa Memorial Matriculation School.
4. Kamarajar Nursery & Primary School.

== Economy ==
Its economy depends mostly on agriculture, business and trading. Once upon a time it was very famous for cotton trading.

Agriculture:

1. As its lands are known for chilli cultivation most people from the nearby surrounding villages come purchase them in bulk during harvest season.
2. Onion and other food crops are cultivated.
3. Banana plantation is one of the major plantations in this village.
4. Tobacco cultivation.

Business:
Its business depends on near by villages, Compared to other nearby villages it has a good infrastructure and hospitality.
