= S. Srinivasa Iyengar =

Indian lawyer, freedom-fighter and politician (1874–1941)

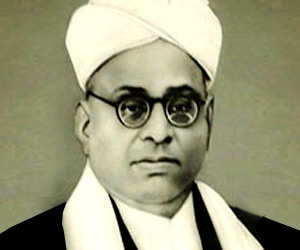
- Portrait of S. Srinivasa Iyengar

Law Member of the Executive Council of the Governor of Madras
- In office 1916–1920
- Governor: John Sinclair, 1st Baron Pentland, Freeman Freeman-Thomas, 1st Marquess of Willingdon,

Advocate-General of Madras Presidency
- In office 1912–1920
- Preceded by: P. S. Sivaswami Iyer
- Succeeded by: C. P. Ramaswami Iyer

Personal details
- Born: 11 September 1874 Ramanathapuram district, British India
- Died: 19 May 1941 (aged 66) Madras
- Education: Presidency College, Madras
- Occupation: Lawyer
- Profession: Attorney-General, Statesman

Seshadri Srinivasa Iyengar CIE (11 September 1874 – 19 May 1941), also seen as Sreenivasa Iyengar and Srinivasa Ayyangar, was an Indian lawyer, freedom-fighter and politician from the Indian National Congress. Iyengar was the Advocate-General of Madras Presidency from 1916 to 1920. He also served as a member of the bar council from 1912 to 1920, the law member of Madras Presidency from 1916 to 1920 and as the president of the madras province Swarajya Party faction of the Indian National Congress from 1923 to 1930. Srinivasa Iyengar was the son-in-law of renowned lawyer and first Indian Advocate-general of Madras, Sir Vembaukum Bhashyam Aiyangar. Iyengar's followers called him Lion of the South.

Iyengar was born in the Ramanathapuram district of Madras Presidency. He graduated in law and practised as a lawyer in the Madras High Court rising to become Advocate-General in 1916. He also served as a member of the bar council and was nominated as the law member of the Governor's executive council. He resigned his Advocate-General post, his seat in the Governor's executive council and returned his C. I. E. in 1920 in protest against the Jallianwala Bagh massacre and joined the Indian National Congress. He participated in the non-cooperation movement. However, in 1923, he broke away along with other leaders as Motilal Nehru and Chittaranjan Das due to differences with Mahatma Gandhi over participating in elections. The breakaway faction later formed the Swarajya Party. Iyengar served as the President of the Tamil Nadu Congress Committee and later, the Madras Province Swarajya Party and was the leader of the party when it refused to form the government in the province despite winning a majority in the 1926 elections. In later life, he established the Independence of India league and organised protests against the Simon Commission. He retired from politics due to differences with other Congress politicians over the goal of Dominion status. He briefly returned to politics in 1938. On 19 May 1941, Iyengar died in his house in Madras.

Iyengar remains the youngest lawyer from the Madras bar to be made Advocate-General. Srinivasa Iyengar was also the mentor of freedom-fighters U. Muthuramalingam Thevar and Sathyamurthy. K. Kamaraj, who later became the president of Tamil Nadu Congress Committee and served as the chief minister of Madras from 1954 to 1962, is believed to be his greatest find. Iyengar's 1939 book on "Mayne's Hindu laws" is a much-acclaimed and well-read book.

During Iyengar's tenure as leader, the Congress was often criticised by EV Ramaswamy and other politicians of the Justice Party as a party dominated by Brahmins. This was because top Congress leaders as Iyengar, Sathyamurthy and C. Rajagopalachari were all Brahmins.

== Early life ==
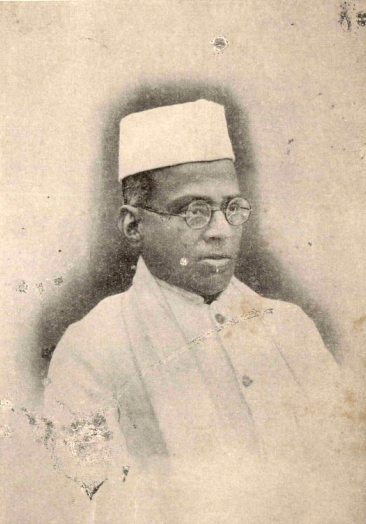

Srinivasa Iyengar was born on 11 September 1874 to Seshadri Iyengar, a prominent landowner of Ramanathapuram district. His parents were orthodox Sri Vaishnava Brahmins of Madras Presidency. Srinivasa Iyengar had his schooling in Madurai and graduated from Presidency College, Madras. His early schooling was in his mother tongue, Tamil.

== Legal career ==
Srinivasa Iyengar commenced practice as lawyer in the Madras High Court in 1898. He had an extensive knowledge of Hindu Dharmasastra and this helped him make a mark for himself. Soon, Iyengar became the right-hand for C. Sankaran Nair. During this time, the Indian freedom-fighter S. Satyamurthi worked as a junior under Iyengar. Later, he followed Iyengar into the Indian National Congress and the Indian independence movement. Satyamurthi worked under Iyengar while he was the president of the Swarajya Party. He later referred to Iyengar as his "political mentor".

In 1911, Bhupendranath Basu introduced the Civil Marriages Bill in the Imperial legislature. This bill was heavily criticised. Iyengar led agitations for the bill. When V. Krishnaswamy Iyer was criticised by extremists after his death, Iyengar defended him.

In 1912, Iyengar was appointed to the Madras Bar Council and he served from 1912 to 1916. In 1916, he became the Advocate-General of Madras Presidency, the youngest ever to occupy the post. He also served as a member of the Madras Senate from 1912 to 1916.

In recognition of his services, Srinivasa Iyengar was appointed Companion of the Order of the Indian Empire (CIE) in the 1920 New Year Honours. Iyengar also served as the Law member on the executive council of the Governor of Madras from 1916 to 1920.

== Political activities ==
=== Indian independence movement ===
Right from his younger days, Srinivasa Iyengar displayed an interest, though trivial, in politics. He attended the historically significant 1907 session of the Indian National Congress held at Surat which is remembered for the split between the moderates and the extremists. In 1908, V. Krishnaswamy Iyer introduced him to Rash Behari Bose "as the son-in-law of Sir V. Bhashyam Aiyangar and in some ways greater than him". However, Iyengar took politics seriously only after the Jallianwala Bagh episode.

In 1920, Srinivasa Iyengar resigned as the Advocate-General of Madras and from the Governor's executive council protesting the Jallianwalla Bagh massacre. In February 1921, he also returned his C.I.E in protest. He joined the Indian National Congress and participated in the non-cooperation movement. In 1927, Iyengar chaired the reception committee of the 29th session of the Indian National Congress which met in Madras.

Iyengar presided over the 1920 Madras Provincial Conference held at Tinnevely and participated in the Congress sessions held at Ahmedabad(1921), Gaya(1922), Kakinada(1923), Delhi(1923), Belgaum(1924), Kanpur(1925), Gauhati(1926), Madras (1927), Calcutta(1928) and Lahore (1929). His work is believed to have given an unparalleled lead to the Congress in Madras for about ten years.

Srinivasa Iyengar presided over the Guwahati session of the Congress in 1926. Iyengar worked hard to deliver a resolution upholding Hindu-Muslim unity, bringing about a temporary political agreement between the political leaders of the two communities. He published Swaraj Constitution, in 1927, outlining a federal scheme of government for future India.

=== Madras Province Swarajya Party ===
When the Congress split in 1923 between the Gandhians and those in support of Council entry, Srinivasa Iyengar was in the non-Gandhian camp and founded the Madras Province Swarajya Party. The Madras Province Swarajya Party contested in the elections to the provincial legislature held between 11 September 1923 and 10 November 1923. Though, as expected, the performance of the Swarajya Party wasn't by any means remarkable, its presence had a major impact on the fortunes of the Justice Party whose majority was considerably reduced compared to the 1920 elections. The Swaraj Party won 20 seats in the 98 member assembly and was the leading opposition party. More importantly, however, the Justice Party won just 44 seats in the 1923 elections compared to the 1920 elections when it had won 64 seats. The Raja of Panagal was elected for a second term as Premier while Iyengar was elected leader of opposition in the assembly.

A little later, a few prominent members of the Justice Party broke off to form the United Nationalist Party and projected themselves as "Democrats". The dissidents were led by C. R. Reddy, a leader of the Justice Party, who complained of the dictatorial rule of the Raja and his insensitive, unimaginative policies. Backed by Srinivasa Iyengar and the Swarajists, Reddy introduced a no-confidence motion against the government of the Raja of Panagal on 27 November 1923. The no-confidence motion was, however, defeated by a margin of 65 votes to 44.

The Swarajya Party won 44 seats in the 1926 elections and emerged as the single largest party in the house. Comparatively, the Justice Party had won just 20 seats. The Raja of Panagal stepped down as Premier. The Governor Lord Goschen invited Srinivasa Iyengar as leader of opposition to form the government. However, Iyengar refused. As a result, the Governor set up an independent government under P. Subbarayan and nominated 34 members to the assembly to support it.

Because Subbarayan's regime was appointed and largely controlled by the Governor, it became the target of strong criticism both from the Justicites as well as the Swarajists. In March 1927, P. Munuswamy Naidu of the Justice Party passed a motion recommending salary cuts for Government ministers. However, they were defeated by a margin of 41 votes. A no-confidence motion was passed on 23 August 1927, but was defeated 56 to 67 with the support of the Governor and the members nominated by him.

The Simon Commission was appointed by the British Parliament in 1927 to report on the working of the progress of the Montagu-Chelmsford reforms. The Swarajya Party moved a resolution to boycott the commission and this was passed 61 to 50 with 12 remaining neutral. Subbarayan opposed the resolution but his cabinet ministers Ranganatha Mudaliar and Arogyaswamy Mudaliar supported it. Subbarayan resigned as Chief Minister, but at the same time, he also compelled his ministers to submit their resignations. Fearing the possibility of the formation of a Swarajya Party-Justice Party coalition Government, the Governor stepped in to foster discord amongst the opposition. To obtain the support of the Raja of Panagal, he appointed Krishnan Nair, a leading member of the Justice Party as his Law Member. Led by the Raja of Panagal, the Justice Party switched sides and lent its support to the Subbarayan government. Soon afterward, the Justice Party passed a resolution welcoming the Simon Commission. The Simon Commission visited Madras on 28 February 1928 and 18 February 1929 and was boycotted by the Swarajya Party and the Indian National Congress. However, the Justicites and the Subbarayan Government accorded the commission a warm reception.

=== Nehru report ===
See Also: Simon Commission

In the Congress session held at Madras in November 1927, decision was made to draw up a "Labour Constitution of the future Government of India". Motilal Nehru was elected as the convenor of the Constitution Drafting Committee. On 10 August 1928, the committee submitted its report declaring dominion status as the goal of the Congress. The report was presented at the Lucknow session of the Indian National Congress held between 28 August 1928 and 31 August 1928.

On 30 August 1928, Jawaharlal Nehru, Srinivasa Iyengar and Subhas Chandra Bose formed the Indian Independence League. This league declared purna swaraj or complete independence from British rule as its ultimate goal and not dominion status. Iyengar was elected President of the league with Nehru and Bose as its secretaries.

When the All-Parties Report (known as the Nehru Report) was published in 1928 outlining a constitution for India in terms of Dominion status, Srinivasa Iyengar organised the Independence League with himself as president and Jawaharlal Nehru and Subhas Chandra Bose as leading members.

Srinivasa Iyengar was elected President of the Congress Democratic Party with Subhas Chandra Bose as its Secretary. Iyengar, however, announced his retirement from active public life early in 1930.

== Later life ==
Srinivasa Iyengar briefly returned to politics in 1938 and supported Subhas Chandra Bose as president of the Congress. However, when Bose formed the Forward Bloc, he described it as a "leaky boat." He was also upset with the outbreak of the Second World War. While presiding over a session of the Tyagaraja Bakajana Sabha in 1938, Iyengar spoke:

Lawyers do not ask musicians to preside over their deliberations, but it had become a fashion to invite a man who knew nothing about music, like myself, to preside over musical events. As a body of self-respecting men and women, musicians should conduct their affairs without outside interference, and communal politics

== Death ==
Iyenger made a brief return to political life in 1939, upon the outbreak of World War II and the debate of whether Indians should back the British effort, banking on their goodwill later to deliver independence, or oppose the entry of Indian army into the war without consultation of the Indian people. He died suddenly on 19 May 1941, at his residence in Madras.

Iyengar died at his residence in Madras on 19 May 1941. He was 66 years old at the time.

== Family ==
Srinivasa Iyengar was married to the third daughter of Sir V. Bhashyam Aiyangar. He had a son, S. Parthasarathy, and a daughter, Ambujammal who was the founder of the Srinivasa Gandhi Nilayam. Parthasarathy studied law and practised as a lawyer before becoming an entrepreneur. He served as the founder and director of the Industrial Development Commission of Madras state and founded the Prithvi Insurance company. In his later life, he became a Hindu monk and adopted the name Swami Anvananda.

== Legacy ==
Besides law, Srinivasa Iyengar's other interest were education, social reform, and politics. Iyengar's 1939 book Mayne's Hindu Law is considered to be a masterpiece. Among his early influences were Sir Sankaran Nair and C. Vijayaraghavachariar, two former Congress leaders. He was also an admirer of Gopal Krishna Gokhale (in whose name he endowed a prize) and later of Mahatma Gandhi. Iyengar was the personal lawyer and a family friend of Muthuramalingam Thevar whom he encouraged to participate in the 1927 Congress session that was held in Madras. Thevar was eventually drawn to the Congress and participated in agitations against the British rule. Iyengar was also close to Swami Suddhananda Bharathi.

One British CID officer described Srinivasa Iyengar as a "political ideas factory". He was described as frank and generous and having brought a fresh and young look to his political ideas. He was known for making brave and outspoken comments on the Governor or Government officials. A contemporary remarks that Iyengar's opinions were as clear cut as his legal arguments. His proficiency in the legal profession was supposedly noticeable right from his early days. In politics, Iyengar was considered to be a champion of the Mylapore clique in Madras politics. Iyengar tried to bring reforms in Indian society. He worked for the elevation of depressed sections of society and educated underprivileged children on his own expense. He also a fine writer and frequently wrote columns for The Hindu, Swadesamitran and Indian Patriot.

Srinivasa Iyengar is credited with having popularised the Congress at the village level in South India. He was a staunch believer in the concept of "linked leadership". He was responsible for the induction of K. Kamaraj and Muthuramalinga Thevar in the Indian National Congress. Iyengar's followers and colleagues called him "Lion of the South".

== Criticism ==
At the 1920 session of the Tamil Nadu Congress Committee, E. V. Ramasamy, a leader of the Congress desired to propose a resolution introducing communal representation in education and employment. However, Srinivasa Iyengar who presided over the session refused to permit it reasoning that it would cause unnecessary communal tension. Periyar criticised Iyengar along with the rest of the Brahmin leadership of the Congress and declared that non-Brahmins can never hope to get justice from the Congress.

== Works ==
- S. Srinivasa Iyengar; John D. Mayne (1939). Mayne's Treatise on Hindu Law and Usage. Madras: Higginbotham's.

== Biographies ==
- K. R. Srinivasa Iyengar (1939). S. Srinivasa Iyengar: the story of a decade in Indian politics. Basel Mission Press (Canarag, Ltd.).
- Kadayam Ramachandra Ramabhadra Sastry (1972). S. Srinivasa Iyengar. Publications Division, Ministry of Information and Broadcasting, Govt. of India.
