= John Dawson Mayne =

British lawyer (1828–1917)

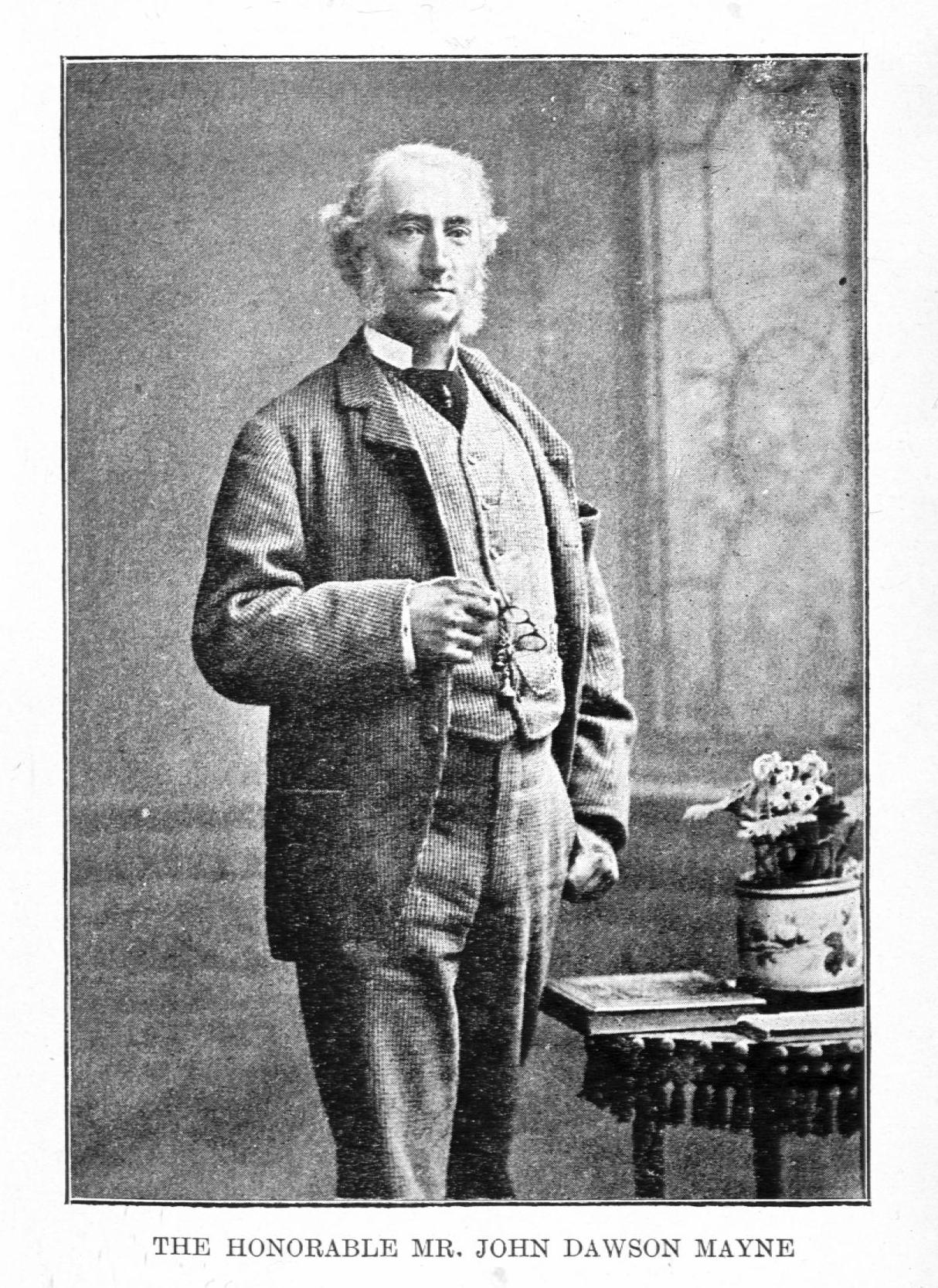

Advocate-General of Madras Presidency
- In office 1868–1872
- Preceded by: John Bruce Norton
- Succeeded by: Sir H. S. Cunningham

Personal details
- Born: 31 October 1828 Dublin, Ireland
- Died: 1917 (Aged 88) Berkshire, England
- Education: Trinity College Dublin
- Occupation: Lawyer
- Profession: Advocate-General

John Dawson Mayne (1828–1917) was a British lawyer and legal expert who served as acting Advocate-General of the Madras Presidency. He is remembered as the author of Mayne's Hindu Law regarded as the most authoritative book on the Indian Penal Code. His married life was marred by a scandal, which prevented him from gaining a knighthood.

== Family ==
Born on 31 December 1828, to John Mayne (1793–1828), a Dublin lawyer who died before John Dawson was born. His mother, Anna (Graves) Johnson (1798–1864), had first married Edward Johnson (died 1818) J.P., of Ballymacash House, County Antrim. Mayne's middle name was for his great-grandfather's cousin and benefactor, Thomas Dawson, 1st Viscount Cremorne.

He came from a well-known family and was a grandson of Judge Edward Mayne and Dean Richard Graves. He was a nephew of Sir Richard Mayne and a first cousin of Admiral Richard Charles Mayne, Chief Justice Sir William Collis Meredith, Edmund Allen Meredith, Sir Richard Graves MacDonnell, Major-General Arthur Robert MacDonnell and Francis Brinkley. His sister married a son of Abraham Colles, and through her, he was the uncle of Ladies Ashbourne and Bewley.

== Career ==
Mayne had his initial education in Dublin and graduated in law from Trinity College Dublin. He was called to the English bar in 1854, but practised in the United Kingdom from 1854 to 1856 before moving to Madras, India. Mayne served as the Professor of law, logic and moral philosophy at the Presidency College, Madras from 1857 throughout the 1860s. He also served as Assistant Legal Secretary to the Madras government from 1860 to 1872 and as a Clerk of the Crown during the 1860s. He served as Advocate-General of Madras from 1862 to 1872. He left India in a cloud of scandal, running away from his wife with the wife of another man, Annie Craigie-Halkett.

In England, despite the scandal, Mayne served as a Professor of Common Law at the Inns of Court from 1879 to 1883. In 1880, he unsuccessfully contested for the Parliamentary seat at Falmouth. He was an enthusiastic family historian, producing an impressively long 'pedigree' of the Maynes from 1900 back through some thirty generations to Normandy, but beyond the 17th century, like so many family histories of the time, it was riddled with errors of assumption.

At Madras, 1859, he married his first wife, Helen Sarah Hamilton (born 1841), daughter of Colonel Robert Hamilton of the Madras Staff Corps. She divorced Mayne in 1872 after he ran off with his soon-to-be second wife, Annie Craigie-Halkett (1833–1917). Annie's first husband's name is unknown, but she was the daughter of Charles Craigie-Halkett-Inglis of Hallhill, Fife and Cramond House, near Edinburgh, by his wife Susan, the youngest daughter of Sir John Marjoribanks of Lees (1763–1833), 1st Bt., M.P., Lord Provost of Edinburgh. Annie and 'JD' (as he was known) divorced their respective spouses so they could marry in May 1873. Annie was reputed to be very beautiful despite her face being marred by a 'Port wine mark' (birth mark), which led her to favouring veils in later life.

In 1917, he and Annie died within six weeks of one another, at their home 'Goodrest', also known as Shinfield Park, Berkshire. The gardens were so extensive at Goodrest that they required twenty gardeners to maintain its upkeep. Mayne left no children by either marriage, but took great joy in being both a financial and legal help to many of his relatives.
