= V. Bhashyam Aiyangar =

Indian lawyer (1844–1908)

Sir Vembakkam Bhashyam Aiyengar CIE
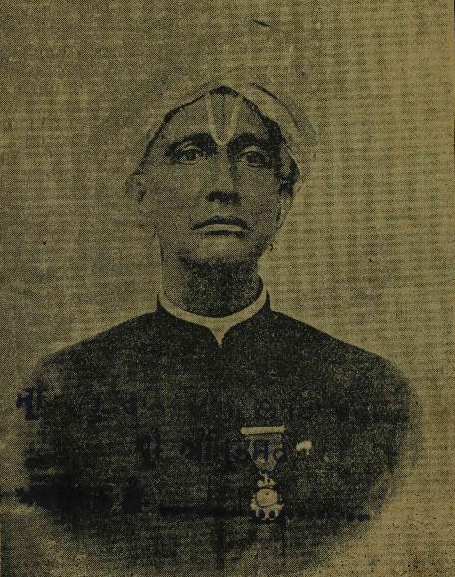

Advocate-General of Madras Presidency (acting)
- In office 1897–1898
- Preceded by: J. H. Spring-Branson
- Succeeded by: C. A. White
- In office 1899–1900
- Preceded by: C. A. White
- Succeeded by: J. E. P. Wallis

Personal details
- Born: Bhashyam; January 1844 Vembakkam, Madras Presidency, India
- Died: 18 November 1908 (aged 64) Madras Presidency, India
- Occupation: lawyer
- Profession: Advocate-General, legislator

Diwan Bahadur Sir Vembakkam Bhashyam Aiyangar Kt. CIE (January 1844 – 18 November 1908) was a lawyer and jurist in British India who served as the first Indian Advocate-General of the Madras Presidency and later, as a Justice of the High Court of Madras.

As a Vakil he was easily the undisputed leader of the Madras bar; he was described as in his heyday, the 'greatest jurist in India', 'India's foremost lawyer', 'perhaps the great Indian lawyer of modern times', and 'a gigantic intellect' who was 'ultimately worshipped as a legal genius', credited with establishing the fundamental credibility of the office of Vakil against that of Barrister.

He was a central figure in the first generation of the Mylapore clique, and the patriarch of the Vembaukum family.

== Posts held ==
Bhashyam Aiyangar served as the Acting Advocate General of Madras from February 1897 to March 1898 and September 1899 to March 1900. He was the first Indian to hold the post. In February 1897, Bhashyam Aiyangar was nominated to the Madras Legislative Council as an official member He was nominated for two more terms in November 1899 and March 1900.

In July 1901, Bhashyam Aiyangar was appointed a Judge of the High Court at Madras, in which position he served until 1904.

== Honours ==
Bhashyam Aiyangar was made a Companion of the Indian Empire in May 1895. He was knighted on 5 February 1900, after a knighthood had been announced in the 1900 New Year Honours list.

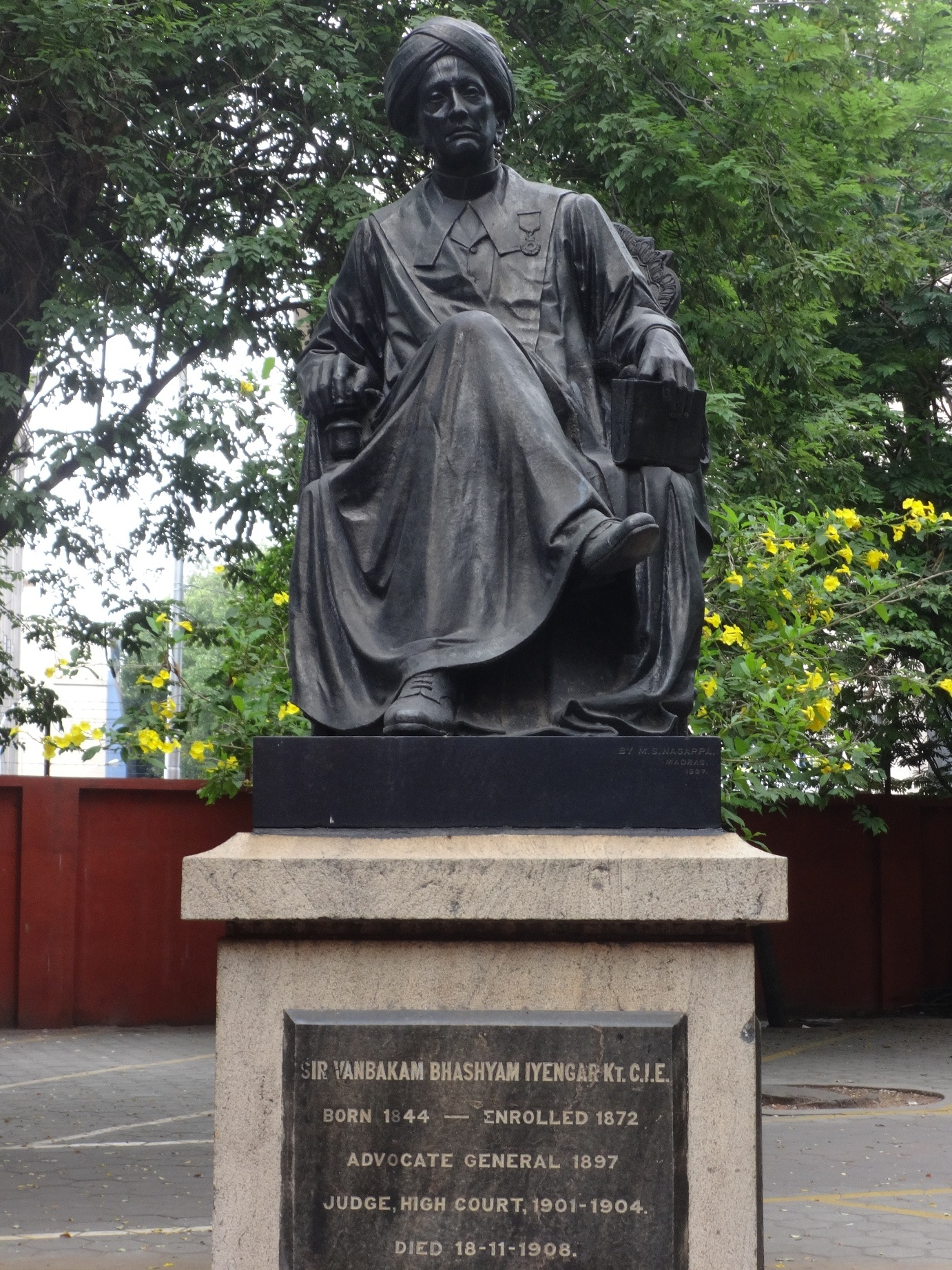
Statue of V. Bhashyam Iyengar

A statue of Bhashyam Aiyangar was donated by M. S. Nagappa in 1927 and has been installed in the Madras High Court campus, just outside the Madras Bar Association entrance.

== Personal life ==
Bhashyam Aiyangar was part of the large and celebrated Vembaukum family. His brother-in-law was C. V. Rungacharlu, Diwan of Mysore. He had a number of daughters. His third daughter was married to eminent lawyer and freedom fighter S. Srinivasa Iyengar, who apprenticed under him, alongside his Vembaukum relatives V. C. Desikachariar and V. C. Seshachariar. The Indian independence activist Ambujammal is his granddaughter. Actor Utkarsh Ambudkar is a descendant of Aiyangar.
