= V. K. Thiruvenkatachari =

Indian lawyer

Vangal Krishnamachari Thiruvenkatachari

Advocate General of Madras State
- In office 1950–1964
- Preceded by: K. Rajah Iyer
- Succeeded by: N. Krishnaswami Reddy

Personal details
- Born: 30 January 1904
- Died: 23 January 1984 (aged 79)

Vangal Krishnamachari Thiruvenkatachari (30 January 1904 – 23 January 1984) was an Indian lawyer who served as the Advocate-General of Madras State from 1951 to 1964. He was the eldest son of Indian civil servant Sir V. T. Krishnamachari. A letter written by Vangal Krishnamachari Thiruvenkatachari became the foundation of Ninth Schedule to the Constitution of India.²
