= John Bruce Norton =

Indian politician

Advocate-General of Madras Presidency
- In office 1863–1868
- Preceded by: Thomas Sydney Smith
- Succeeded by: John D. Mayne

Personal details
- Born: 8 July 1815 London, England
- Died: 13 July 1883 (aged 68) London, England
- Children: Eardley Norton
- Education: Harrow, Merton College, Oxford
- Profession: Barrister

John Bruce Norton (8 July 1815 – 13 July 1883) was a British barrister and educationist who served as the Advocate-General of the Madras Presidency. He was the father of the barrister and Indian independence activist Eardley Norton.

== Early life ==
John Bruce Norton was born in London in 1815, a son of the British soldier and lawyer John David Norton (1787–1843) who served as a judge of the Supreme Court of Madras in 1841–42. John Bruce Norton was educated at Harrow and Merton College, Oxford, then in 1841 enrolled at Lincoln's Inn to read for the bar.

Norton was an avid cricketer and played in the Harrow School Cricket Eleven during the 1832–33 season.

== Career ==
In 1842 Norton moved with his father to India and commenced a legal practice in Madras. He was appointed Sheriff of Madras in 1843, serving until 1845, in which year he was appointed as Government Pleader, continuing in that post until 1862. In 1863 he was appointed as Advocate-General of Madras, serving until his retirement in 1871. He was also a member of the Madras Legislative Council from 1862 to 1868.
