= Dr. Ambedkar Government Law College, Chennai =

Law college in Chennai, Tamil Nadu

Coordinates: 13°5′15.17″N 80°17′8.27″E

- Madras Law College
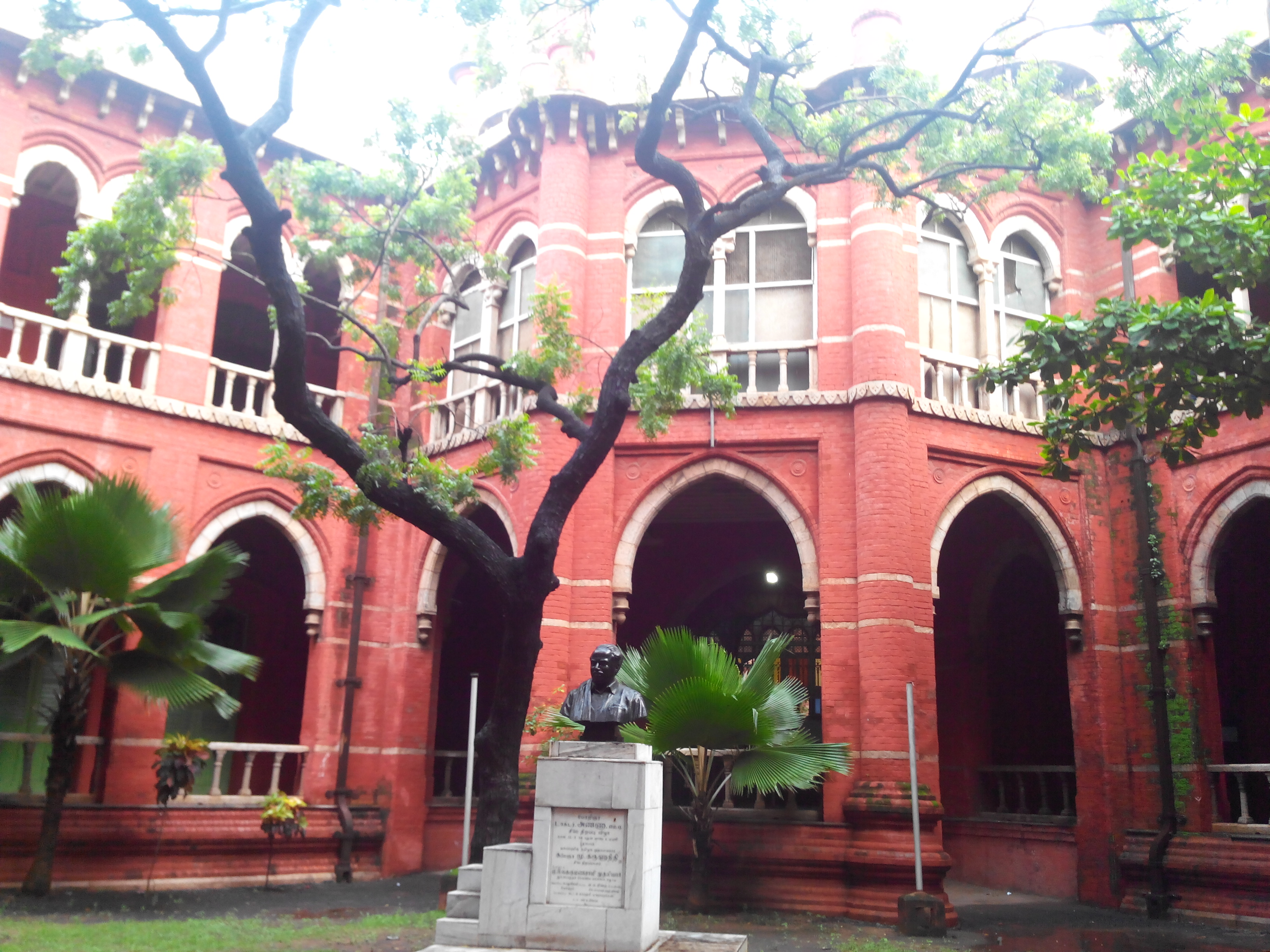
- Other name: DRAGLC
- Motto: Fiat justitia ruat caelum ("Let justice be done though the heavens fall.")
- Type: Government Law College
- Established: 2 May 1891; 135 years ago
- Parent institution: 1891–1996: University of Madras; 1996–present: Tamil Nadu Dr. Ambedkar Law University
- Students: 1800
- Location: Chennai, Tamil Nadu, India
- Website: www.draglc.ac.in

Dr. Ambedkar Government Law College, commonly known by its former name Madras Law College, is a law school, located in Chennai (Madras), Tamil Nadu, India. It is also referred to as Government Law College or GLC, Chennai. It was established in 1855. It was renamed in 1990, as Dr. Ambedkar Government Law College, by the Government of Tamil Nadu in commemoration of the birth centenary of B. R. Ambedkar. In 1997, the Government of Tamil Nadu passed an Act which transferred the college from the University of Madras to the newly established Tamil Nadu Dr. Ambedkar Law University.

== History ==
The genesis of legal education in Madras can be traced to the informal law classes conducted by George Norton, Advocate General of the Madras State (1827–1853) in his house in the form of conversations in the early 19th century. In 1852, at the direction of Sir Henry Eldred Pottinger, the Governor of Madras during that period, a Government High School was expanded into the Presidency College, Chennai. John Bruce Norton was appointed as the first professor of law in 1855, who delivered his lectures at the Presidency College, Chennai. Till 1884, there was only one professor of law in the Presidency College, Chennai. To supplement lectures by tutorials, a second professor was appointed in 1884 and to him, the tutorial work was entrusted. The scheme was put on trial for two years and it proved a success. So it was continued for two more years from 1 January 1886.

H. B. Grigg, the Director of Public Instruction, who evinced keen interest in improving the status of legal education in Madras, sent a proposal to the Government for setting up a Central Law College in Madras. The Government concurred with Grigg that changes were necessary in the arrangements for Law Instruction and that an independent institution should be established. In 1885, Justice T. Muthuswamy Iyer also supported the proposal. The proposal was sanctioned by the Secretary of State, on the advice of the Council of Legal Studies (Education) in London and the Law College was established as an independent institution under the control of the Director of Public instruction. Mr. Reginald, A. Nelson, the first Principal, entered upon his duties on 2 May 1891.

Thus, the Law College came into existence. For seven and a half years after birth, it had no habitation of its own and the college was housed at the Senate House of the University of Madras. A project to place the new institution as near the High Court as possible led to the selection of a site for erecting a structure to the west of the High Court building. The building structure of the Law College was designed by Mr.Henry Irwin, the Government Architect and the Law College moved into that building on 9 January 1899. As a natural consequence of gaining a building of its own, the Law College was converted into a full time institution.

The Diamond Jubilee of Madras Law College was celebrated on 14 March 1952. P. V. Rajamannar, the first Indian to become the Chief Justice of the Madras High Court, presided over the function.

In 2018, the Law College was split into two different campuses and moved to different campuses as the building structure which housed the college for more than 100 years, was found to be damaged and had a risk of collapsing.

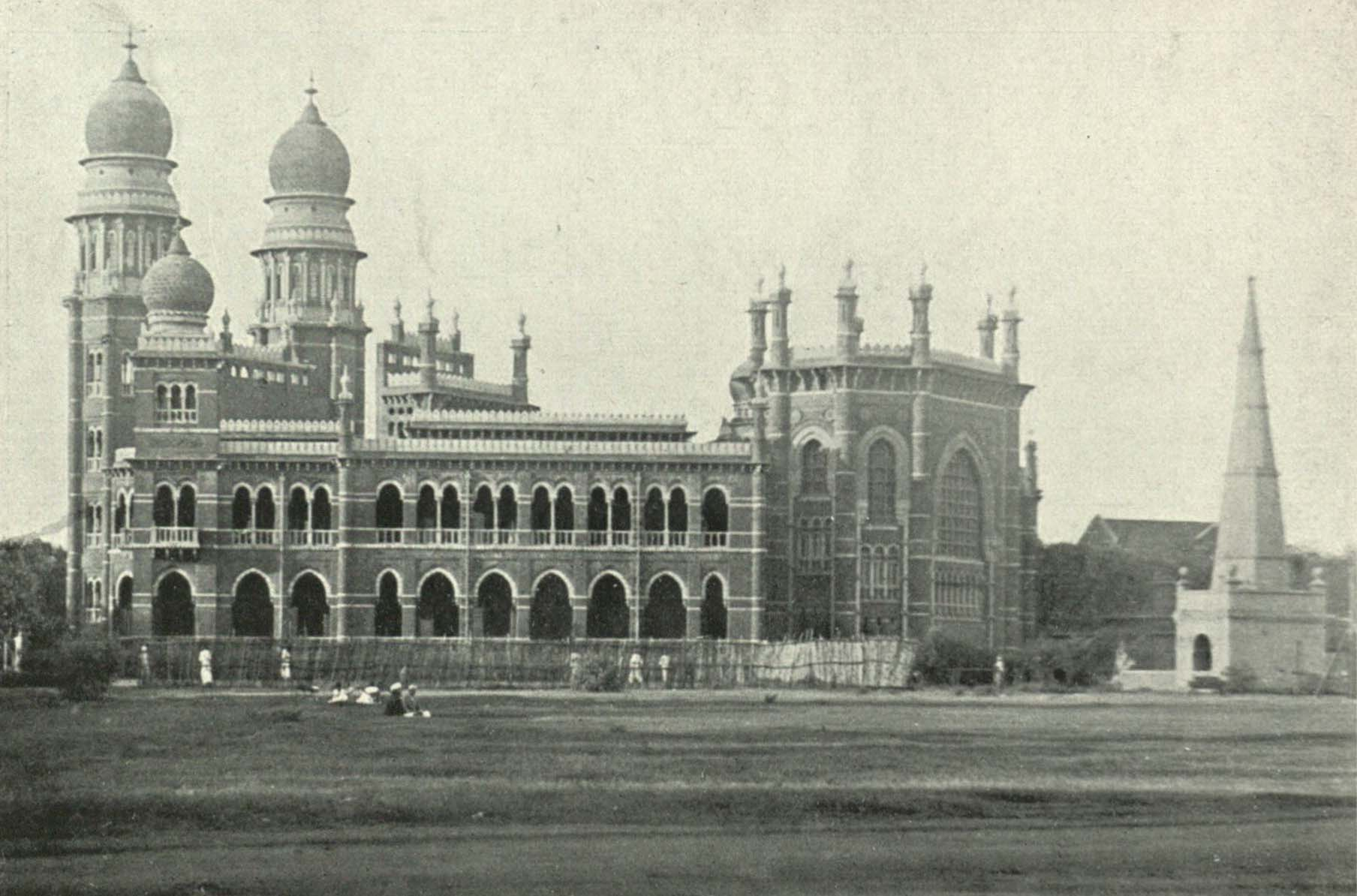
The Law College in Madras, c. 1905

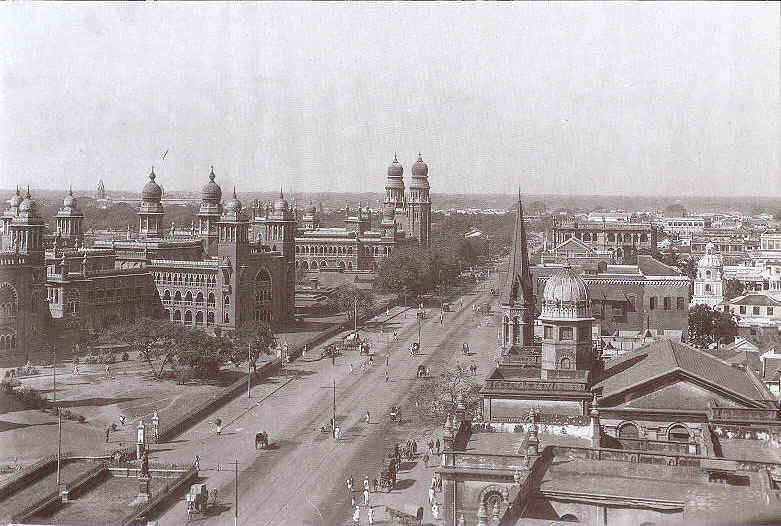
Madras High Court and the Law College

== Admission ==
At present, the admissions are made through Tamil Nadu Dr. Ambedkar Law University. It enrolls 562 students every year.

== Academics ==
In the early seventies, the college was upgraded into a post-graduate institution with the introduction of M.L. courses. It primarily offers 5-year integrated B.A., B.L. and 3-year B.G.L. under-graduate programmes.

From 1973 to 1974, the Tamil Language has also been made as a medium of instruction in Law as part of a government policy to introduce Tamil as the official language at all levels in the state.

With a view to upgrading the standards of legal education, B.A.B.L., (Hons) course was initially introduced in the college from the academic year 2002–2003. But the same was shifted to the Tamil Nadu Dr. Ambedkar Law University with effect from the academic year 2006–2007.

== Campus ==
Until 2015, the Madras Law College was located within the campus of High Court of Madras. Its building structure being very similar to the High Court structures, popularly, many South-Indian movies have been known to portray the Law college structures as Court halls wherever the movie required a court room scenes. The Primary structure of the old campus, designed by English architect Henry Irwin, is a classic example of Indo-Saracenic Architectural style. It used to house most of the Administrative sections of the college and the Moot Hall. The Library was housed in a newer building built around 2008 and more classrooms were also added with additional blocks. The old campus had many other old structures and tombs. The college used to have a large sports ground adjacent to it in the early 1990s, which was eventually taken over for accommodating the High Court structures and turned into a car parking facility.

In 2018, the Campus was split into two and moved to two different premises outside the Chennai City limits. The decision to shift the campus was made after the discovery of core damages to the primary structure of the college building owing to the Metro Rail construction work around 2015. Presently, the campus at Pudupakkam Village, Chengalpet taluk of Kancheepuram district, accommodates 1,205 students who study five-year law courses. The campus at Pattaraiperumbudur Village, Thiruvallur District, accommodates 1,123 students who study three-year law courses.

== Hostel ==
The college does not provide a hostel within its campus. The men's hostel has been at No. 92, Millers Road Kilpauk, Chennai since 1959 and women's hostel has been at No. 133, Walajah Road, Chepauk, Chennai. The hostel facilities are very limited and are filled up on merit basis.

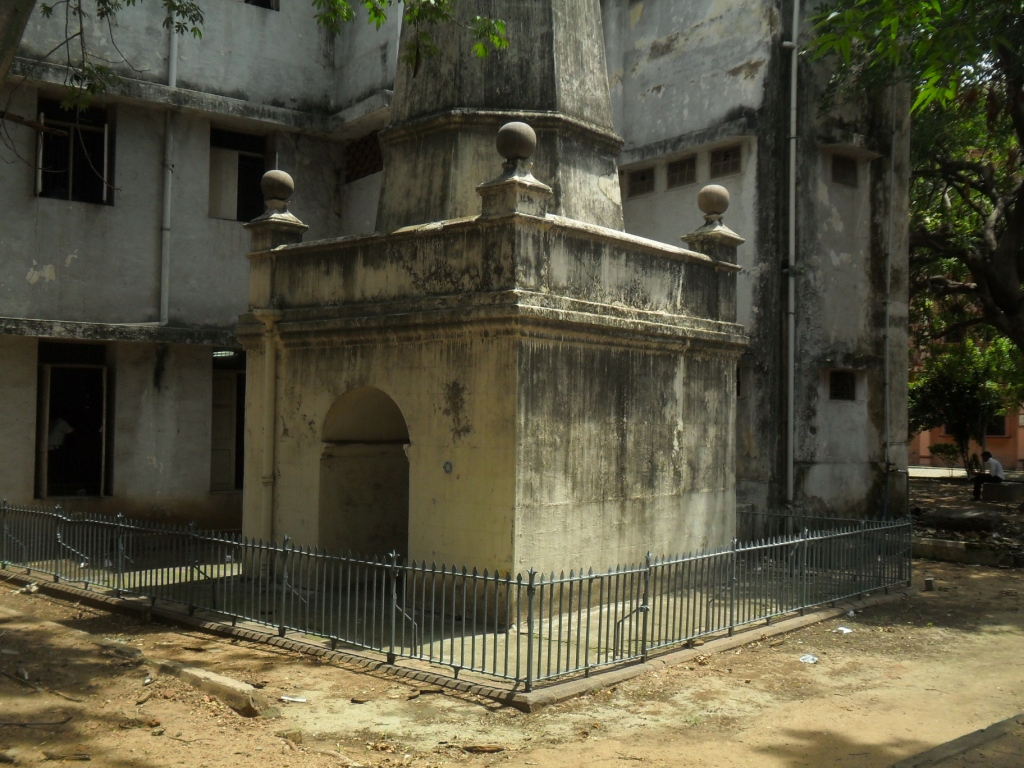
David Yale and Thomas Tomb

== Student life ==
The college has been actively participating in many Moot courts, in India and also internationally and occasionally it hosts its own National level Moot Court Competition called as FIAT JUSTITIA.

== List of principals ==
Succession List of Principals
S.No	Name	From	To
1.	Thiru R.A. Nelson B.A., L.L.B., Bar-at-law	1891	1913
2.	Thiru K. Narayana Rao B.A., L.L.B., I.C.S. Director of Legal Studies and Head of the department.	(Actg.) 28 July	25 August 1902
3.	Thiru. Charles E.Odgers M.A.B.C.L (Bar-at-law)	(Actg.) 26 August	25 November 1902
		2 February 1905	19 August 1906
		30 June 1908	22 April 1909
4.	Dr. S. Swaminathan (Bar-at-law)	(Actg.) 29 June 1908	18 October 1909
		9 July 1912	12 December 1913
5.	Thiru. Arthur Davies, B.A., (Bar-at-law)	1913	1927
6.	Thiru C. Madhavan Nair, B.L., Bar-at-Law	(Actg.) 5 July 1920	
7.	Thiru C. Kunhi Raman, B.A., B.L., Bar-at-Law	(Actg.) 10 April 1924	2 March 1925
8.	Thiru Mariadas Ruthnaswamy M.A., Bar-at-Law	1928	1929
9.	Thiru K. Krishna Menon, M.A., B.C.L.,	1930	1949
10.	Thiru Siram.Govindarajulu Naidu, B.A. LL.B., (cantab), B.L., (Madras), Bar-at-Law.	1949	1967
11.	Prof.A.Palaniswami, M.L Principal and Head of Department	1967	1968
12.	Prof. C. Rajaraman, M.A., LL.B., (Cantab), Bar-at-law	1974	1978
13.	Prof. Master Sankaran, M.L.,	1978	1983
14.	Prof. T. Audiseshan, M.L.	1983	1995
15.	Prof.S.Narayanaswamy, M.L.,	1995	1997
16.	Prof. C. Robin, M.A., LL.M.,	1 June 2008	31 July 2011.
17.	Dr. G.C. Kothandan M.A.,(Hist.) M.A. (Soci.)., M.L., D.C.F.Sc., PhD	2002	2004
18.	Dr.G.P.Godhana Gandhi, M.A.M.L., D.R.S., D.H.ED., PhD,	2004	2005
19.	Prof.C.Robin, M.A., LL.M.,	2005	2006
20.	Dr. J.Jayamani, M.L. PhD, M.A.M.L., D.R.S., D.H.ED., PhD,	2006	2008
21.	Prof. M. Mohamed Iqbal, M.A., LL.M.,	2008	2011
22.	Prof. K. Balaji Naidu, M.A., M.L., M.Phil.,	2011	2012
23.	Prof. Dr. S.Narayanaperumal, M.L., PhD,	2012	2013
24.	Prof.Dr.N.S.Santhosh Kumar M.Com., M.A., M.L., PhD,	2013	2014
25.	Prof.Dr.K.Murugadoss B.Com., M.L., D.T.L., PhD,	2014	2016
26.	Prof. Dr. Gowri Ramesh M.L., PhD,	2016	2016
27.	Prof.C.Chockalingam M.A., M.L., PhD, (Pattaraiperambadur)	2016	Till date
28.	Prof. Dr. J. Vijayalakshmi L.L.M., PhD, (Pudupakkam)	2018	2019
29.	Prof. Dr. Gowri Ramesh M.L., PhD,(Pudupakkam)	2019	Till date

== Notable alumni ==
=== Presidents ===
- R. Venkataraman, eighth President of India (1987–1992)

=== Chief Justices of India ===
- Koka Subba Rao, ninth Chief Justice of India (from 1958 to 1967) and was also a Chief Justice of Andhra Pradesh High Court (1956–1958)
- P. Sathasivam, 40th Chief Justice of India (in 2013) and is the former Governor of Kerala

=== Judges of the Supreme Court of India ===
- P. Satyanarayana Raju, Judge, Supreme Court of India (1965–1966) and was also the Chief Justice of Andhra Pradesh High Court (1964–1965)
- V. Balakrishna Eradi, Judge, Supreme Court of India (1981) and was also the Chief Justice of Kerala High Court (1980)
- B. Jagannadha Das, Judge of the Supreme Court of India and was also the Chief Justice of Orissa High Court
- Sivasankar Natarajan, judge of the Supreme Court of India
- Vazhakkulangarayil Khalid
- Fakkir Mohamed Ibrahim Kalifulla
- Palapatti Sadaya Goundar Kailasam
- V.R.Krishna Iyer

=== Judges of the High Courts ===
- M. Karpaga Vinayagam, former Chief Justice of the Jharkhand High Court (2006)
- V. Periyakaruppiah, Judge, High Court of Madras (2007–2012)
- P. D. Dinakaran, Chief Justice of Sikkim High Court (2008–2011)
- C. S. Karnan, Judge of the Calcutta High Court
- Justice S. Manikumar, Chief Justice of Kerala High Court
- M. Narayan Moorthy, Judge, High Court of Madras (1981–1983)
- Lingaraj Panigrahi, former Chief Justice of Orissa High Court
- Sundaram Nainar Sundaram, Chief Justice of the Gujarat and Telangana High Court
- T. S. Sivagnanam, former Chief Justice of the Calcutta High Court

=== Chief Ministers of States ===
- Damodaram Sanjivayya, Chief Minister of Andhra Pradesh (1960–1964)
- M. Bhaktavatsalam, Chief Minister of Madras State (1963–1967)
- Kotla Vijaya Bhaskara Reddy, Chief Minister of Andhra Pradesh (1982–1983; 1992–94)
- Panampilly Govinda Menon, Chief Minister of Travancore–Cochin (1956-1957)

=== Ministers ===
- E. Ikkanda Warrier, Last Prime Minister of State of Cochin
- V. K. Krishna Menon, former Defence Minister of India
- Kurma Venkata Reddy Naidu
- Jana Krishnamurthi, former Minister of Law and Justice
- P. Chidambaram, former Finance Minister of India
- V. K. Krishna Menon, former Defence Minister of India
- M. A. Ayyangar, the first Deputy Speaker of the Lok Sabha and the Speaker of the 2nd Lok Sabha
- John Mathai, India's first Railway Minister and subsequently Finance Minister under First Nehru ministry.
- R. K. Shanmukham Chetty, India's first Finance Minister
- Murasoli Maran
- S. Kumaraswami Reddiar
- A. Ranganatha Mudaliar, Minister of Public Health and Excise for the Madras Presidency
- Panampilly Govinda Menon, former Minister of Law and Justice (1967-1970) and former Minister of Railways (1969-1970)
- O. Rajagopal, Former MP, MLA and Union Minister - Government of India

=== Advocates ===
- P. S. Sivaswami Iyer, Advocate General of Madras (1907–1911)
- C. Sankaran Nair, Advocate General of Madras (1908) and President of the Indian National Congress (1897)
- S. Ashok Kumar

=== Others ===
- M. B. Nirmal, social activist and founder of Exnora International
- T. N. Manoharan, Chartered Accountant and former president of Institute of Chartered Accountants of India
- E. Krishna Iyer, a freedom-fighter, classical artist and activist
- Digavalli Venkata Siva Rao, historian and Telugu writer
- D. R. Karthikeyan, special director of the Central Bureau of Investigation (1998) and Director General, National Human Rights Commission
- Swami Vireshwarananda, tenth president of the Ramakrishna Math and Ramakrishna Mission
- Mithavaadi Krishnan, journalist, social reformer and Izhava leader
