= Vembakkam =

- Town
- Location in Tamil Nadu, India Vembakkam (India)
- Coordinates: 12.79669°N 79.6°E
- Country: India
- State: Tamil Nadu
- District: Thiruvannamalai district

Languages
  - Official: Tamil
- Time zone: UTC+5:30 (IST)
- Postal code: 631232

Vembakkam is a town panchayat situated in the Vembakkam taluk, Tiruvannamalai district of the Indian state of Tamil Nadu. It is located about 20 kilometres (12 mi) from the town of Kanchipuram. It contains a BDO office for many villages around it.

== Other places with the same name ==
Other villages in Tamil Nadu that have the same name as Vembakkam:

- Vembakkam Tamil Nadu 603111; village located about 4 miles (6.4 km) from Singaperumal Koil. (12°46'22.0"N 79°57'20.6"E 12.772779, 79.955732)
- Chengalpattu taluk Vembakkam code 629450 (12°48'52.3"N 79°53'35.2"E 12.814523, 79.893106)
- Kanchipuram taluk Vembakkam code 629688
- Tirukalukundram Taluk Vembakkam 629913 (12°39'46.3"N 79°58'16.2"E 12.662851, 79.971166)
