= 1937 Madras Presidency Legislative Assembly election =

1937 Madras Presidency legislative assembly election
- February 1937

All 215 seats in the Legislative Assembly of Madras Presidency 108 seats needed for a majority
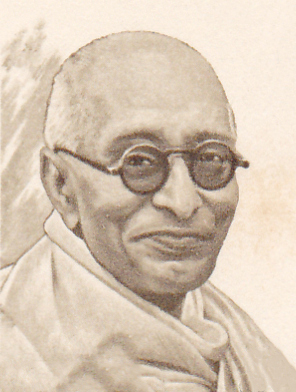

	First party	Second party
Leader	C. Rajagopalachari	Raja of Bobbili
Party	INC	Justice Party
Leader's seat	Madras University Constituency	Bobbili (lost)
Seats won	159	18
Percentage	73.95%	8.37%
Prime Minister before election
Kurma Venkata Reddy Naidu
Justice Party
Elected Prime Minister
C. Rajagopalachari
INC

The first legislative assembly election for the Madras Presidency was held in February 1937, as part of the nationwide provincial elections in British India. The Indian National Congress obtained a majority by winning 159 of 215 seats in the Legislative Assembly. This was the first electoral victory for the Congress in the presidency since elections were first conducted for Madras Legislative Council in 1920. The Justice Party which had ruled the presidency for most of the previous 17 years was voted out of power. The assembly was constituted in July 1937 and C. Rajagopalachari (Rajaji) became the first Congress Prime Minister of Madras.

The Congress also won the election held simultaneously for the Legislative Council. The victory in Madras was the Congress' most impressive electoral performance in all the provinces of British India. The Congress Government that was formed after the elections lasted till October 1939, when it resigned protesting India's involvement in the Second World War. The next election was held in 1946.

== Government of India Act of 1935 ==
The Government of India Act of 1935 abolished dyarchy and ensured provincial autonomy. It created a bicameral legislature in the Madras province. The legislature consisted of the governor and two legislative bodies – a legislative assembly and a legislative council. The assembly consisted of 215 seats, out of which majority were to be elected through limited adult franchise exercised through separate electorates devised for Hindus, Muslims & Christians, while others were distributed to various pro-government interest groups like Anglo-Indians, Europeans, Commerce & Landholders in addition to Labour and University Constituencies.

The Act provided for a limited adult franchise based on property qualifications. Seven million people, roughly 15% of the Madras people holding land or paying urban taxes were qualified to be the electorate. Separate ballot boxes were kept for candidates of different political parties. The Congress was allotted the yellow coloured box, while the Muslim League was allotted green coloured box.

== Issues and campaign ==
The Justice Party had been in power in Madras for 17 years since 1920. Its hold on power was briefly interrupted only once in 1926-28 when P. Subbarayan was a non-affiliated Prime Minister.

=== Unpopularity of the Justice Government ===
The Justice Government under the Raja of Bobbili had been steadily losing ground since the early 1930s. It was beset with factional politics and its popularity was eroding slowly due to the autocratic rule of Bobbili Raja. The Raja was inaccessible to his own party members and tried to destroy the power and influence of the District level leaders who were instrumental in the party winning power earlier. The Suthanthira Sangu, in its issue dated 26 February 1935 explained the destruction of the power of local bodies:

The Local Boards Act has been recently amended, taluk boards have been abolished, a district board has been bifurcated and attempts have been made to bifurcate other boards, which are hostile to him.... He is superseding municipalities, which do not bow to his authority, removing chairmen not liked by him and trying to forfeit the liberty of these bodies by the appointment of Commissioners.

The Justice party was seen as the collaborative party, agreeing with the British Government's harsh measures. Its economic policies during the Great Depression of the 1930s were also highly unpopular. Its refusal to decrease the land revenue taxation in non-Zamindari areas by 12.5% was hugely unpopular. The Bobbili Raja, himself a Zamindar, cracked down on the Congress protests demanding reduction of the revenue. This further reduced the popularity of the Justice Party. The Governor of Madras, Lord Erskine reported to the then Secretary of State Zetland in February 1937, that the peasants in South India had become fed up with the Justice Party and "every sin of omission or commission of the past fifteen years is put down to them [Justice Party]". The affluent lifestyle led by the Justice ministers at the height of the Great Depression were sharply criticized by the Madras Press. They drew a monthly salary of Rs. 4,333.60 when compared to Rs. 2,250 per month the ministers in the Central Provinces received. This invoked the ire of the Madras press. The newspaper India wrote:

Is not Rs. 2,000 enough for Madras ministers, who were only second-rate vakils (lawyers) in the mufassal (rural areas)? When the poor are suffering for want of money, they are drawing fat salaries? What an injustice? When the country is on fire, when the axe of retrenchment has fallen on the poor and when the people are experiencing intense suffering under the heavy burden of taxation, the Madras Ministers have started on their tours immediately after passing the budget.

Even the European owned newspaper The Madras Mail which had been the champion of the earlier Justice Governments was sickened by the ineptitude and patronage policies of the Bobbili Raja administration. On 1 July 1935, it wrote in its editorial: "if the Justice Party is really determined upon reorganisation... the spoils system must go. The extent of the discontent against the Justice Government is reflected in an article of Zamin Ryot:

The Justice Party has disgusted the people of this presidency like plague and engendered permanent hatred in their hearts. Everybody, therefore, is anxiously awaiting the fall of the Justice regime which they consider tyrannical and inauguration of the Congress administration.... Even old women in villages ask as to how long the ministry of the Raja of Bobbili would continue

=== Resurgence of the Congress ===
The Swaraj Party which had been the Justice party's main opposition merged with the Indian National Congress in 1935 when the Congress decided to participate in the electoral process. The Madras Province Congress party was led by S. Satyamurti and was greatly rejuvenated by its successful organisation of the Salt Satyagraha and Civil Disobedience movement of 1930–31. The Civil Disobedience movement, the Land Tax reduction agitations and Union organizations helped the Congress to mobilize popular opposition to the Bobbili Raja government. The revenue agitations brought the peasants into the Congress fold and the Gandhian hand spinning programme assured the support of weavers. Preferential treatment given to European traders brought the support of the indigenous industrialists and commercial interests. The Congress had effective campaigners like Satyamurti and Rajaji while the Justice party had only Arcot Ramasamy Mudaliar to counter them. The Congress election manifesto was populist in nature and promised to reduce land revenue taxes, to ensure decent working conditions and wages for the laborers, low rents and all around prosperity. It even appealed to the Europeans who had reserved seats in the Assembly. It also appealed to the nationalist sentiment of the populace. Commenting on the Congress's manifesto, the Indian Annual Register said:

The promises made in the election manifesto by the congress, while seeking suffrage, roused hopes, that the Congress government, if voted to power, would give relief to them. Perhaps the Agrarian distress forced the Indian National Congress to give up the policy and programme of non-cooperation and to undertake the responsibility of Government under a hated act

The Congress campaign was effective and targeted all sections of the population like peasants, workers, weavers and businessmen. Against it the Justice party had no definite program or policies. It could only harp on the Brahmin domination in Congress. Amidst the backdrop of the Great Depression and economic distress their charge was not effective. Satyamurti utilised the services of popular actors like V. Nagayya and K. B. Sundarambal for the election campaign. In particular Sundarambal vigorously campaigned for the Congress. Satyamurti also produced a campaign film directed by A. Narayanan of Srinivasa Cinetone. It featured the speeches of Rajaji, Satyamurti and other Congress leaders. But the film was banned by the colonial government. The coloured box system enabled the most organised party - the Congress to have uniform slogans throughout the presidency. The slogan "vote for Gandhi and the yellow box", was very popular and helped the party to mobilise its supporters.

=== Other parties ===
The other parties contesting the election were the Madras Province Muslim League (MPML) headed by Jamal Mohammad, the People's Party of Madras started by Raja of Pithapuram (a breakaway faction from the Justice Party) and the Muslim Progressive Party led by Nawab C. Abdul Hakim and S. M. Pasha.

== Results ==
Party	Hindu urban	Hindu rural	Hindu women	Muslim urban	Muslim rural	Muslim women	Indian Christian	Indian Christian women	Anglo-Indian	European	Backward Tribal	Commerce	Landholders	Labour	University	Total
Indian National Congress	14 (inclusive of 1 seat reserved for Dalits)	123 (inclusive of 25 seats reserved for Dalits)	6	-	4	-	3	1	-	-	1	-	-	6	1	159
Justice Party	1	4 (inclusive of 2 seats reserved for Dalits)	-	-	8	-	4	-	-	-	-	1	3	-	-	21
All India Muslim League	-	-	-	1	8	-		-	-	-	-	-	-	-	-	9
People's Party	-	-	-	-	-	-	-	-	-	-	-	-	1	-	-	1
Muslim Progressive Party	-	-	-	-	1	-	-	-	-	-	-	-	-	-	-	1
Independent Hindus	-	4 (inclusive of 2 seats reserved for Dalits)	-	-	-	-	-	-	-	-	-	1	2	-	-	7
Independent Muslims	-	-	-	1	5	1	-	-	-	-	-	-	-	-	-	7
Unaligned	-	-	-	-	-	-	1	-	2	3	-	4	-	-	-	10
Total	15 (inclusive of 1 seat reserved for Dalits)	131 (inclusive of 29 seats reserved for Dalits)	6	2	26	1	8	1	2	3	1	6	6	6	1	215

=== Members elected ===
Reservation	Constituency	Member
Hindu	Madras City North	P. M. Adikeshavalu Naicker
Hindu	Madras City North Central	G. Rangiah Naidu
Hindu	Madras City South Central	T. Prakasham
Hindu	Madras City South Central (Depressed Classes)	J. Shivashanmugham Pillai
Hindu	Madras City South	N. S. Varadachariar
Hindu	Visakhapatnam Town	T. Vishwanadham
Hindu	Kakinada Town	B. Sambamurthi
Hindu	Bezwada-cum-Masulipatnam Towns	A. Kaleshwara Rao
Hindu	Guntur-cum-Tenali Towns	Konda Venkatappaya
Hindu	Tanjore-cum-Kumbhakonam Towns	V. Bhuvaraghava Aiyangar
Hindu	Tiruchirappalli-cum-Srirangam Towns	P. Ratnavelu Thevar
Hindu	Madurai Town	N. M. R. Subbaraman Aiyar
Hindu	Tirunelveli-cum-Palayamkottai Towns	K. P. Yagneswara Sharma
Hindu	Coimbatore Town	C. P. Subbiah Mudaliyar
Hindu	Salem Town	V. R. Perumala Chetty
Hindu	Tekkali	P. Shyamasundara Rao
Hindu	Chicacole	C. Narasimham
Hindu	Chicacole (Depressed Classes)	G. Guruvulu
Hindu	Bobbili	V. V. Giri
Hindu	Palakonda	Y. V. Bhaskara Rao
Hindu	Vizianagaram	Alluri Yogi Naidu
Hindu	Vizianagaram (Depressed Classes)	P. L. Narasimharaju
Hindu	Sarvasiddhi	D. L. Narasimharaju
Hindu	Viravalli	D. Venkataramaswami
Hindu	Vishakapatnam	V. J. Gupta
Hindu	Rajamahendri	B. Raja Rao
Hindu	Rajamahendri (Depressed Classes)	K. Veeraraghavaswami Naidu
Hindu	Amalapuram	K. Venkata Rao
Hindu	Amalapuram (Depressed Classes)	P. Lakshmanaswami
Hindu	Kakinada	M. Pallamraju
Hindu	Kakinada (Depressed Classes)	B. S. Murthi
Hindu	Ellore	M. Bapineedu
Hindu	Ellore (Depressed Classes)	G. Venkanna
Hindu	Bhimavaram	D. Narayana Raju
Hindu	Narasapur	G. Venkata Reddy Naidu
Hindu	Bandar	Maharaja Pusapati Alakanarayana Gajapati Raju of Vizianagaram/Raja Y. Shivarama Prasad of Challapalli (Note: The former died soon after being elected, so the latter was elected in the by-polls held in March 1937.)
Hindu	Bandar (Depressed Classes)	V. Kurmaiyya
Hindu	Bezwada	Raja Vasireddy Durgasadashiveshwara Prasad of Muktyala (in Krishna district)
Hindu	Bezwada (Depressed Classes)	K. Venkatanarayana Rao
Hindu	Guntur	A. Rami Reddy
Hindu	Narasaraopet	K. Venkata Reddy
Hindu	Tenali	K. Chandramauli
Hindu	Ongole	P. Buchappa Naidu
Hindu	Ongole (Depressed Classes)	P. Subbbaya
Hindu	Gudur	B. Venkatanarayana Reddy
Hindu	Gudur (Depressed Classes)	K. Shanmugham
Hindu	Nellore	V. Venkatasubbaiya
Hindu	Kavali	B. Gopala Reddy
Hindu	Kandukur	B. Perumal Naidu
Hindu	Rajampet	N. Ranga Reddy
Hindu	Cuddapah	K. Koti Reddy
Hindu	Cuddapah (Depressed Classes)	S. Nagayya
Hindu	Penukonda	K. Subba Rao
Hindu	Penukonda (Depressed Classes)	D. Kadirappa
Hindu	Gooty	R. Venkatappa Naidu
Hindu	Anantapur	C. Obi Reddy
Hindu	Bellary	H. Sitarama Reddy
Hindu	Bellary (Depressed Classes)	Govinda Das
Hindu	Hospet	B. Anantachar
Hindu	Kurnool	O. Lakshmanaswami Rao
Hindu	Kurnool (Depressed Classes)	S. Nagappa
Hindu	Nandyal	G. Venkata Reddy
Hindu	Chandragiri	K. Varadachari
Hindu	Tiruttani	R. B. Ramakrishna Raju
Hindu	Tiruttani (Depressed Classes)	M. Doraikannu
Hindu	Madanapalle	N. Ramakrishna Reddy
Hindu	Chittoor	C. R. Parthasarathi Aiyangar
Hindu	Kanchipuram	P. S. Srinivasa Aiyar
Hindu	Chingleput	K. Bhashyam Aiyangar
Hindu	Chingleput (Depressed Classes)	Rao Bahadur M. C. Rajah
Hindu	Saidapet	P. Natesha Mudaliyar
Hindu	Thiruvallur	M. Bhaktavatsalam Mudaliyar
Hindu	Thiruvallur (Depressed Classes)	O. Chengam Pillai
Hindu	Thirupattur-North Arcot	K. A. Shanmuga Mudaliyar
Hindu	Gudiyattam	B. T. Sheshadrichariar
Hindu	Vellore	V. M. Ramaswami Mudaliyar
Hindu	Ranipet	B. Bhaktavatsala Naidu
Hindu	Ranipet (Depressed Classes)	J. Adimulam
Hindu	Chheyar	D. Ramalinga Reddiyar
Hindu	Thiruvannamalai	N. Annamalai Pillai
Hindu	Thiruvannamalai (Depressed Classes)	A. Ramalingam
Hindu	Tindivanam	R. Venkatasubba Reddiyar
Hindu	Tindivanam (Depressed Classes)	K. Kulashekharan
Hindu	Villupuram	S. Chidambaram Aiyar
Hindu	Chidambaram	R. Ponnuswami Pillai
Hindu	Chidambaram (Depressed Classes)	A. S. Sahajananda Swami
Hindu	Cuddalore	K. Sitarama Reddiyar
Hindu	Thirukkoyilur	A. Subramanian
Hindu	Thirukkoyilur (Depressed Classes	Rao Sahib V. I. Munuswami Pillai
Hindu	Tanjore	V. Nadimuthu Pillai
Hindu	Tanjore (Depressed Classes)	M. Marimuthu
Hindu	Kumbhakonam	P. Venkatarama Aiyar
Hindu	Mayavaram	S. Ramanathan
Hindu	Mannargudi	A. Vedaratnam Pillai
Hindu	Mannargudi (Depressed Classes)	K. Kolandavelu Nayanar
Hindu	Nagapattinam	A. M. P. Subbarama Chettiyar
Hindu	Tiruchirappalli	K. Periyaswami Gounder
Hindu	Tiruchirappalli (Depressed Classes)	N. Halasyam Aiyar
Hindu	Musiri	P. Marimuthu Pillai
Hindu	Ariyalur	B. Venkatachalam Pillai
Hindu	Ariyalur (Depressed Classes)	R. Maruthai
Hindu	Dindigul	K. Kuppuswami Aiyar
Hindu	Palani	R. S. Venkatarama Aiyar
Hindu	Palani (Depressed Classes)	K. Balakrishnan Kutumban
Hindu	Periyakulam	K. Shaktivadivelu Gounder
Hindu	Thirumangalam	A. K. A. Ramachandra Reddiyar
Hindu	Melur	L. Krishnaswami Bharati
Hindu	Srivilliputthur	P. S. Kumaraswami Raja
Hindu	Sattur	K. Kamaraja Nadar
Hindu	Sattur (Depressed Classes)	R. S. Manikkam
Hindu	Ramnad	U. Muthuramalinga Thevar
Hindu	Thirupattur-Ramnad	V. S. R. M. Valliappa Chettiyar
Hindu	Shivaganga	Muthu Kr. Ar. Kr. Arunachalam Chettiyar
Hindu	Tuticorin	A. R. A. S. Duraiswami Nadar
Hindu	Koilpatti	L. S. Karayalur
Hindu	Koilpatti (Depressed Classes)	Pal Chinnamuthu
Hindu	Sermadevi	Lakshmi Ammal
Hindu	Tirunelveli	T. S. Chokkalingam Pillai
Hindu	Pollachi	Palaniswami Gounder
Hindu	Pollachi (Depressed Classes)	Krishna Kutumban
Hindu	Palladam	K. S. Ramaswami Gounder
Hindu	Erode	K. S. Periyaswami Gounder
Hindu	Dharapuram	S. V. Venaudaya Gounder
Hindu	Gobichettipalayam	K. N. Nanjappa Gounder
Hindu	Gobichettipalayam (Depressed Classes)	D. Srinivasaiayan
Hindu	Coimbatore	V. C. Palaniswami Gounder
Hindu	Nilgiri	H. B. Ari Gouder
Hindu	Hosur	P. T. Venkatachari
Hindu	Dharmapuri	M. G. Natesha Chetty
Hindu	Tiruchengode	P. Subbarayan
Hindu	Omalur	K. A. Nachiappa Gounder
Hindu	Namakkal	N. Nagaraja Aiyangar
Hindu	Namakkal (Depressed Classes)	M. P. Periyaswami
Hindu	Salem	S. C. Venkatappa Chettiyar
Hindu	Kundapura	A. Balakrishna Shetty
Hindu	Kundapura (Depressed Classes)	K. Ishwara
Hindu	Puttur	K. R. Karant
Hindu	Mangalore	B. Venkataraya Baliga
Hindu	Chirakkal	P. Madhavan
Hindu	Kottayam	M. P. Damodaran
Hindu	Malappuram	A. Karunakara Menon
Hindu	Malappuram (Depressed Classes)	E. P. Kannan
Hindu	Calicut	A. Chandu
Hindu	Kurumbranad	C. K. Govindan Nayar
Hindu	Palghat	R. V. Raghava Menon
Hindu	Ponnani	K. Raman Menon
Hindu	Madras City women	Rukmini Lakshmipathi
Hindu	Ellore Town women	C. Ammanna Raja
Hindu	Thalassery-cum-Calicut Towns women	A. V. Kuttimalu Amma
Hindu	Cuddalore women	Anjalai Amma
Hindu	Bellary women	Dr. N. Lakshmi Devi
Hindu	Dindigul women	K. Lakshmi Amma
Muslim	Madras City	Abdul Hamid Khan
Muslim	Calicut-cum-Kannur-cum-Thalassery Towns	Haji P. I. Kunhammad Kutti
Muslim	Vishakapatnam-cum-East Godavari	Mir Akram Ali
Muslim	West Godavari-cum-Krishna	Mehbub Ali Baig
Muslim	Guntur	Sheikh Muhammad Laljan
Muslim	Nellore	Muhammad Abdus Salam
Muslim	Cudappah	S. Ghaus Mohiuddin
Muslim	Kurnool	Khan Abdul Rahim Khan
Muslim	Bellary	D. Abdur Rauf
Muslim	Anantpur	Muhammad Rahmatullah
Muslim	Chittoor	Yakub Hassan
Muslim	Chingleput-cum-South Arcot	Bashir Ahmed Syed
Muslim	North Arcot	M. Ahmed Badshah
Muslim	Tanjore	Ahmed Thambi Muhammad Mohiuddin Marakkayar
Muslim	Tiruchirappalli	Khan Bahadur P. Khalifullah Rowther
Muslim	Madurai	Khan Sahib Muhammad Abdul Kadir Rowther
Muslim	Ramnad	Syed Ibrahim
Muslim	Tirunelveli	V. S. T. Sheikh Mansoor Tharanganar
Muslim	Salem-cum-Coimbatore-cum-Nilgiri	Khan Sahib K. A. Sheikh Dawood
Muslim	Chirakkal	Abdur Rahman Ali Raja of Arakkal
Muslim	Kottayam	A. K. Kaderkutty
Muslim	Calicut	P. M. Syed Attakoya Thangal
Muslim	Malappuram	Muhammad Abdur Rahman
Muslim	Malappuram	K. Unnikammu
Muslim	Palghat	M. Sheikh Rowther
Muslim	Palghat	P. Moideen Kutty
Muslim	Puttur	Khan Bahadur Muhammad Schamnad
Muslim	Mangalore	Haji Syed Hussain
Muslim	Madras City women	Mrs Khadija Yakub Hassan
Indian Christian	Northern Circars	D. R. Isaac
Indian Christian	Guntur-cum-Nellore	J. Raja Rao
Indian Christian	Central Districts	M. Samuel Jonathan
Indian Christian	Madras-cum-Chingleput	Diwan Bahadur A. Appadurai Pillai
Indian Christian	South Arcot-cum-Tiruchirappalli-cum-Salem-cum-Coimbatore	V. J. Samu Pillai
Indian Christian	Tanjore-cum-Madurai-cum-Ramnad	Rao Bahadur A. T. Pannirselvam
Indian Christian	Tirunelveli	J. L. P. Roche Victoria
Indian Christian	West Coast	C. J. Varkey
Indian Christian	Tirunelveli-cum-Palayamkottah-cum-Tuticorin Towns women	Mrs Jebamoney Masilamoney
Backward Tribes		P. Pedda Padalu
Anglo-Indian		E. H. M. Bower
Anglo-Indian		E. M. D'Mello
European		G. E. Walker
European		G. B. Reade
European		J. Nuttal
Commerce	European	Sir William Owen Wright
Commerce	European	G. L. Orchard
Commerce	European	John Mackenzie Smith
Commerce	Madras Planters	William Kenneth Macauley Langley
Commerce	Southern Indian Chamber of Commerce	T. T. Krishnamachari
Commerce	Nattukottai Nagarathar Association	Kumararaja M. A. Muttiah Chettiyar of Chettinad
Landowners	Northern	V. Narayana Gajapati Raju of Chemudu
Landowners	Northern	Raja M. Venkataramaia Appa Rao of Mirzapuram (in Krishna district)
Landowners	Northern Central	G. Krishna Rao
Landowners	Southern Central	K. S. Saptarishi Reddiyar
Landowners	Southern	T. V. K. Kamaraja Pandiya Nayaka of Bodinayakkanur
Landowners	West Coast	R. M. Palat
Labour	Railway Trade Union	G. Krishnamurthi
Labour	Textile Workers' Trade Union	G. Chelvapathy Chetty
Labour	Textile Workers	N. G. Ramaswami Nayudu
Labour	Madras City dock and factories (excluding textiles and railways)	P. R. K. Sharma
Labour	Vishakapatnam-cum-East Godavari dock and factories	Subba Rao Karunakaran
Labour	West Godavari-cum-Krishna-cum-Guntur factories	V. V. Narasimhan
Madras University		C. Rajagopalachari

== Analysis ==
=== Causes for defeat ===
The victory of Congress over the Justice Party has been ascribed to various reasons. N. Ram, editor-in-chief of The Hindu and Robert L. Hardgrave, professor emeritus in the Humanities, Government and Asian Studies at University of Texas, Austin attribute the defeat of the Justice party to its collaboration with the British Government. According to Hardgrave:

The Justice Party had strangled itself on the rope it had woven: Support of the British Raj had brought it to power, but with the impact of national self-consciousness and aspiration for Swaraj, its imperial connection brought its defeat

Dr. David A. Washbrook, senior research fellow of History at Trinity College, Cambridge and Andre Beteille say the elitist nature of the Justice Party members caused its defeat. Marguerite Ross Barnett attributes the Justice party's defeat to two causes - 1) The loss of Dalit and Muslim support and 2) Flight of the social radicals to the Self-Respect Movement. According to P. Rajaraman:

...internal dissension, ineffective organisation, inertia and lack of proper leadership led the Justice Party along the path of decline.

=== Notable losses ===
Many incumbent ministers of the Justice Government were defeated in this election. The Prime Minister Raja of Bobbili was defeated by V. V. Giri of Congress by a margin of over 6000 votes in the Bobbili Assembly constituency. Other prominent Justice losers included Kumararaja of Venkatagiri, P. T. Rajan, A. P. Patro and the Raja of Ramnad.

== Government formation ==
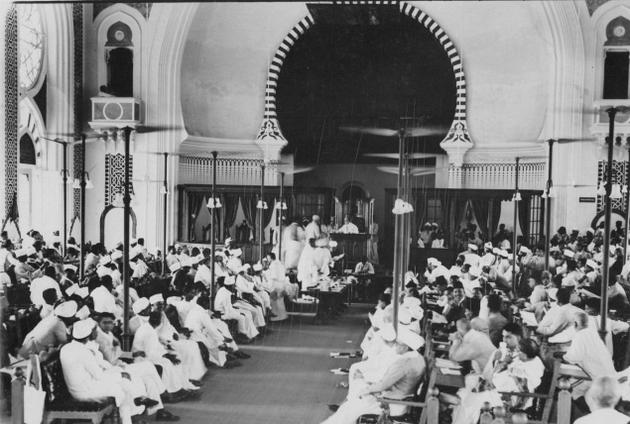
1937 Madras Legislative Assembly

The elections were held and the results declared in February 1937. Rajaji was elected as the leader of Congress Legislature Party (CLP) in March 1937. Despite being the majority party in the Assembly and the council, the Congress was hesitant to form a Government. Their objections stemmed from the special powers given to the Governor by the Government of India Act of 1935. According to the act, the Governor was given 1) special responsibilities in the area of Finance and (2) control and absolute discretionary powers over the cabinet in certain other issues. The Governor had the power to overrule the Cabinet. The Congress refused to accept power (in all the six provinces where they had won) with such caveats. The Governor of Madras, Lord Erskine, decided to form an interim provisional Government with non-members and opposition members of the Legislative Assembly. V. S. Srinivasa Sastri was first offered the Prime Ministership of the interim government but he refused to accept it. Eventually an interim Government was formed with Kurma Venkata Reddy Naidu of the Justice Party as Prime Minister on 1 April 1937. Congress leaders like S. Satyamurti were apprehensive about the decision to not accept power. They carried out a campaign to convince Congress High Command (Mohandas K. Gandhi and Jawaharlal Nehru) to accept power within the limitations set by the Government of India Act. They also appealed to the British Government to give assurances that the Governor's special powers will not be misused. On 22 June, Viceroy Linlithgow issued a statement expressing the British Government's desire to work with the Congress in implementing the 1935 Act. On 1 July, the Congress Working Committee (CWC) agreed to form Governments in the provinces they had won. On 14 July, Rajaji was sworn in as the Prime Minister. The first legislative assembly convened for the first time on 15 July and elected Bulusu Sambamurti and A. Rukmani Lakshmipathi as the Speaker and Deputy Speaker respectively.

=== Kurma Venkata Reddy Naidu's Cabinet ===
Council of ministers in K. V. Reddy Naidu's interim provisional cabinet (1 April - 14 July 1937):

Minister	Portfolio
Kurma Venkata Reddy Naidu	Prime Minister, Public, Revenue and Legal
A. T. Panneerselvam	Home and Finance
M. A. Muthiah Chettiar	Local self-government
P. Kalifulla Sahib Bahadur	Public Works
M. C. Rajah	Development
R. M. Palat	Education and Public health

=== Rajagopalachari's Cabinet ===
Council of Ministers in Rajagopalachari's Cabinet (15 July 1937 – 29 October 1939):

Minister	Portfolio
C. Rajagopalachari	Prime Minister, Public and Finance
T. Prakasam	Revenue
P. Subbarayan	Law and Education
Bayya Suryanarayana Murthy	Labour and Industries
Bezawada Gopala Reddy	Local Administration
T. S. S. Rajan	Public Health and Religious Endowments
Maulana Yakub Hasan Sait	Public Works
V. I. Munuswamy Pillai	Agriculture and Rural Development
S. Ramanathan	Public Information and Administration Reports
Kongattil Raman Menon	Courts and Prisons

Changes

- On 7 January 1939, Raman Menon died and C. J. Varkey, Chunkath was inducted into the cabinet. Education portfolio was transferred from Subbarayan to Varkey and instead Subbarayan was given additional charge of Courts and Prisons.

== Impact ==
The 1937 elections marked the start of the Indian National Congress' participation in the governance of India. In the Madras Presidency, it also marked the beginning of Rajaji's ascendancy in the Congress Legislature Party. Though it was Satyamurti who had led the election campaign, he gave up the leadership of the Legislature to Rajaji in accordance to the wishes of the national leaders of the Congress in Delhi. This election also marked the beginning of Congress dominance in the politics of Madras Presidency and later the Madras State. Except for an interlude during 1939–46, the Congress would go on to rule Madras uninterrupted till 1967. The Justice Party was demoralized by its defeat and the Raja of Bobbili temporarily retired from active politics. The party remained in political wilderness and eventually came under the control of Periyar E. V. Ramasamy in 1938 and transformed into the Dravidar Kazhagam in 1944.
