= 1937 Madras Presidency Legislative Council election =

1937 subnational election in British India

1937 Madras Presidency legislative council election
- 1937

46 in Madras Legislative Council 24 seats needed for a majority
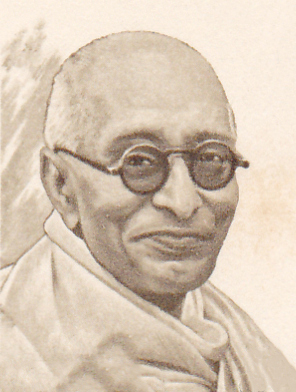

	First party	Second party
Leader	C. Rajagopalachari	Raja of Bobbili
Party	INC	Justice Party
Seats won	27	7
Seat change	▼2	▼21
Percentage	58.70%	15.22%
Swing	▲29.11%	▼13.35%
Premier before election
Kurma Venkata Reddy Naidu
Justice Party
Elected Premier
C. Rajagopalachari
INC

The first legislative council election for the Madras Presidency after the establishment of a bicameral legislature by the Government of India Act of 1935 was held in February 1937. The Indian National Congress obtained a majority by winning 27 out of 46 seats in the Legislative Council for which the elections were held. This was the first electoral victory for the Congress in the presidency since elections were first conducted for the Council in 1920 and C. Rajagopalachari (Rajaji) became the Premier. The Justice Party which had ruled the presidency for most of the previous 17 years was voted out of power. Congress also won the Legislative assembly election held simultaneously.

== Government of India Act of 1935 ==
The Government of India Act of 1935 established a bicameral legislature in the Madras province. The legislature consisted of the Governor and two Legislative bodies - a legislative assembly and a legislative council. The legislative council consisted of a minimum of 54 and a maximum of 56 members. It was a permanent body not subject to dissolution by the governor, and one-third of its members retired every three years. 46 of its members were elected directly by the electorate, while the governor could nominate 8 to 10 members. The breakdown of seats in the council was as follows:

General	Mohammadans	Indian Christians	Europeans	Nominated
35	7	3	1	8-10

The Act provided for a limited adult franchise based on property qualifications. Seven million people, roughly 15% of the Madras people holding land or paying urban taxes were qualified to be the electorate.

== Issues and campaign ==
The Justice Party had been in power in Madras for 17 years since 1920. Its hold on power was briefly interrupted only once in 1926-28 when P. Subbarayan was a non-affiliated First Minister.

=== Unpopularity of the Justice Government ===
The Justice Government under the Raja of Bobbili had been steadily losing ground since the early 1930s. It was beset with factional politics and its popularity was eroding slowly due to the autocratic rule of Bobbili Raja. The Raja was inaccessible to his own party members and tried to destroy the power and influence of the District level leaders who were instrumental in the party winning power earlier. The Suthanthira Sangu, in its issue dated 26 February 1935 explained the destruction of the power of local bodies:

The Local Boards Act has been recently amended, taluk boards have been abolished, a district board has been bifurcated and attempts have been made to bifurcate other boards, which are hostile to him.... He is superseding municipalities, which do not bow to his authority, removing chairmen not liked by him and trying to forfeit the liberty of these bodies by the appointment of Commissioners.

The Justice Party was seen as the collaborative party, agreeing with the British Government's harsh measures. Its economic policies during the Great Depression of the 1930s were also highly unpopular. Its refusal to decrease the land revenue taxation in non-Zamindari areas by 12.5% was hugely unpopular. The Bobbili Raja, himself a Zamindar, cracked down on the Congress protests demanding reduction of the revenue. This further reduced the popularity of the Justice Party. The Governor of Madras, Lord Erskine reported to the then Secretary of State Zetland in February 1937, that the peasants in South India had become fed up with the Justice Party and

every sin of omission or commission of the past fifteen years is put down to them (Justice Party)

The affluent lifestyle led by the Justice ministers at the height of the Great Depression were sharply criticized by the Madras Press. They drew a monthly salary of Rs. 4,333.60 when compared to Rs. 2,250 per month the ministers in the Central Provinces received. This invoked the ire of the Madras press. The newspaper India wrote:

Is not Rs. 2,000 enough for Madras ministers, who were only second-rate vakils (lawyers) in the mufassal (rural areas)? When the poor are suffering for want of money, they are drawing fat salaries? What an injustice?... When the country is on fire, when the axe of retrenchment has fallen on the poor and when the people are experiencing intense suffering under the heavy burden of taxation, the Madras Ministers have started on their tours immediately after passing the budget.

Even the European owned newspaper The Madras Mail which had been the champion of the earlier Justice Governments was sickened by the ineptitude and patronage policies of the Bobbili Raja administration. On 1 July 1935, it wrote in its editorial:

if the Justice Party is really determined upon reorganisation... the spoils system must go

The extent of the discontent against the Justice Government is reflected in an article of Zamin Ryot:

The Justice Party has disgusted the people of this presidency like plague and engendered permanent hatred in their hearts. Everyboy [sic?], therefore, is anxiously awaiting the fall of the Justice regime which they consider tyrannical and inauguration of the Congress administration.... Even old women in villages ask as to how long the ministry of the Raja of Bobbili would continue

=== Resurgence of the Congress ===
The Swaraj Party which had been the Justice party's main opposition merged with the Indian National Congress in 1935 when the Congress decided to participate in the electoral process. The Madras Province Congress party was led by S. Satyamurti and was greatly rejuvenated by its successful organisation of the Salt Satyagraha and Civil Disobedience movement of 1930–31. The Civil Disobedience movement, the Land Tax reduction agitations and Union organizations helped the Congress to mobilize popular opposition to the Bobbili Raja government. The revenue agitations brought the peasants into the Congress fold and the Gandhian hand spinning programme assured the support of weavers. Preferential treatment given to European traders brought the support of the indigenous industrialists and commercial interests. The Congress had effective campaigners like Satyamurti and Rajaji while the Justice party had only Arcot Ramasamy Mudaliar to counter them. The Congress election manifesto was populist in nature and promised to reduce land revenue taxes, to ensure decent working conditions and wages for the laborers, low rents and all around prosperity. It even appealed to the Europeans who had reserved seats in the Assembly. It also appealed to the nationalist sentiment of the populace. Commenting on the Congress's manifesto, the Indian Annual Register said:

The promises made in the election manifesto by the congress, while seeking suffrage, roused hopes, that the Congress government, if voted to power, would give relief to them. Perhaps the Agrarian distress forced the Indian National Congress to give up the policy and programme of non-cooperation and to undertake the responsibility of Government under a hated act

The Congress campaign was effective and targeted all sections of the population like peasants, workers, weavers and businessmen. Against it the Justice party had no definite program or policies. It could only harp on the Brahmin domination in Congress. Amidst the backdrop of the Great Depression and economic distress their charge was not effective.

=== Other parties ===
The other parties contesting the election were the Muslim League (MPML) headed by Jamal Mohammad, the People's Party of Madras started by Raja of Pithapuram (a breakaway faction from the Justice Party) and the Muslim Progressive Party led by Nawab C. Abdul Hakim and S. M. Pasha.

== Results ==
Party	Hindu	Muslim	Christian	European	Total
Indian National Congress	26	-	-	-	26
Justice Party	3	2	-	-	5
All India Muslim League	-	3	-	-	3
People's Party	-	-	1	-	1
Independent Hindus	6	-	-	-	6
Independent Muslims	-	2	-	-	2
Unaligned	-	-	2	1	3
Total	35	7	3	1	46

=== Members of the Legislative Council ===
	Constituency	Member
Hindu	Anantapur	M. Narayana Rao
Hindu	Bellary	B. Bhima Rao
Hindu	Chingleput	Rao Bahadur K. Daivasigamani Mudaliyar
Hindu	Chittoor	Rao Bahadur M. Ramakrishna Reddy
Hindu	Coimbatore-cum-Nilgiri	T. A. Ramalingam Chettiyar
Hindu	Cuddapah	Rao Bahadur V. Vasant Rao
Hindu	East Godavari	D. Sriramamurti
Hindu	East Godavari	N. Subba Raju
Hindu	East Godavari	L. Subba Rao
Hindu	Guntur	V. Venkatapunnayya
Hindu	Krishna	B. Narayanaswami Naidu
Hindu	Krishna	K. P. Mallikarjunudu
Hindu	Kurnool	N. Sankara Reddy
Hindu	Madras City	U. Rama Rao
Hindu	Madras City	K. Venkataswami Naidu
Hindu	Madurai	Rao Sahib A. S. Alaganan Chettiyar
Hindu	Malabar	K. Madhava Menon
Hindu	Malabar	M. Narayana Menon
Hindu	Nellore	L. Subbarami Reddy
Hindu	North Arcot	C. Perumalaswami Reddiyar
Hindu	Ramnad	A. Rangaswami Aiyangar
Hindu	Ramnad	T. C. Srinivasa Aiyangar
Hindu	Salem	S. K. Sathakopa Mudaliyar
Hindu	South Arcot	R. Srinivasa Aiyangar
Hindu	South Kanara	D. Manjaya Hegde
Hindu	Tanjore	S. A. Ramanathan Chettiyar
Hindu	Tanjore	N. R. Samiappa Mudaliyar
Hindu	Tanjore	K. S. Shivasubrahmanya Aiyar
Hindu	Tiruchirappalli	K. V. Srinivasa Aiyangar
Hindu	Tirunelveli	M. D. Kumaraswami Mudaliyar
Hindu	West Godavari	V. Ganga Raju
Hindu	West Godavari	P. Peddi Raju
Hindu	Vishakhapatnam	N. Venkatachalamji
Hindu	Vishakhapatnam	P. Veerabhadraswami
Hindu	Vishakhapatnam	P. Venkata Jogayya Pantulu
Muslim	Madras North	Munshi Abdul Wahab
Muslim	Madras North Central	Syed Abdul Wahab Bukhari
Muslim	Madras South	S. K. Ahmed Meeran
Muslim	Madras South Central	Khan Bahadur Maulvi Gulam Jilani Qureshi
Muslim	Madras South Central	Khan Bahadur Hamid Sultan Marakkayar
Muslim	Madras West Coast	Khan Bahadur T. M. Moidu
Muslim	Madras West Coast	C. P. Mammu Keyi
Christian		S. J. Gonsalves
Christian		Diwan Bahadur S. E Runganadhan
Christian		Jerome A. Saldanha
European		Sir Frank Birley
Nominated		Dr. T. S. S. Rajan
Nominated		C. Ramalinga Reddy
Nominated		Rao Bahadur M. Raman
Nominated		Diwan Bahadur R. Srinivasan
Nominated		V. S. Srinivasa Shastri
Nominated		Rao Bahadur Sir Kurma Venkata Reddy Naidu
Nominated		Khan Bahadur Sir Muhammad Usman
Nominated		Dr. P. J. Thomas
Nominated		Mrs H. S. Hensman

== Analysis ==
The victory of Congress over the Justice Party has been ascribed to various reasons. N. Ram, Editor-in-Chief of The Hindu and Richard L. Hardgrave, professor emeritus in the Humanities, Government and Asian Studies at University of Texas, Austin attribute the defeat of the Justice party to its collaboration with the British Government. According to Hardgrave:

The Justice Party had strangled itself on the rope it had woven: Support of the British Raj had brought it to power, but with the impact of national self-consciousness and aspiration for Swaraj, its imperial connection brought its defeat

David A. Washbrook, senior research fellow of History at Trinity College, Cambridge and Andre Beteille say the elitist nature of the Justice Party members caused its defeat. Marguerite Ross Barnett attributes the Justice party's defeat to two causes - 1) The loss of Dalit and Muslim support and 2) Flight of the social radicals to the Self-Respect Movement. According to P. Rajaraman:

...internal dissension, ineffective organisation, inertia and lack of proper leadership led the Justice Party along the path of decline.

== Government formation ==
The elections were held and the results declared in February 1937. Rajaji was elected as the leader of Congress Legislature Party (CLP) in March 1937. Despite being the majority party in the Assembly and the Council, the Congress was hesitant to form a Government. Their objections stemmed from the special powers given to the Governor by the Government of India Act of 1935. According to the act, the Governor was given 1) special responsibilities in the area of Finance and (2) control and absolute discretionary powers over the cabinet in certain other issues. The Governor had the power to overrule the Cabinet. The Congress refused to accept power (in all the six provinces where they had won) with such caveats. The Governor of Madras, Lord Erskine, decided to form an interim provisional Government with non-members and opposition members of the Legislative Assembly. V. S. Srinivasa Sastri was first offered the Premiership of the interim government but he refused to accept it. Eventually an interim Government was formed with Kurma Venkata Reddy Naidu of the Justice Party as Prime Minister on 1 April 1937. Congress leaders like S. Satyamurti were apprehensive about the decision to not accept power. They carried out a campaign to convince Congress High Command (Mohandas K. Gandhi and Jawaharlal Nehru) to accept power within the limitations set by the Government of India Act. They also appealed to the British Government to give assurances that the Governor's special powers will not be misused. On 22 June, Viceroy Linlithgow issued a statement expressing the British Government's desire to work with the Congress in implementing the 1935 Act. On 1 July, the Congress Working Committee (CWC) agreed to form Governments in the provinces they had won. On 14 July, Rajaji was sworn in as the Premier. The first legislative assembly convened for the first time on 15 July and elected Bulusu Sambamurti and A. Rukmani Lakshmipathi as the Speaker and Deputy Speaker respectively.

=== Kurma Venkata Reddy Naidu's Cabinet ===
Council of ministers in K. V. Reddy Naidu's interim provisional cabinet(1 April - 14 July 1937):

Minister	Portfolio
Kurma Venkata Reddy Naidu	Premier, Public, Revenue and Legal
A. T. Panneerselvam	Home and Finance
M. A. Muthiah Chettiar	Local self-government
P. Kalifulla Sahib Bahadur	Public Works
M. C. Rajah	Development
R. M. Palat	Education and Public health

=== Rajagopalachari's Cabinet ===
Council of Ministers in Rajagopalachari's Cabinet (15 July 1937 – 29 October 1939):

Minister	Portfolio
C. Rajagopalachari	Premier, Public and Finance
T. Prakasam	Revenue
P. Subbarayan	Law and Education
V. V. Giri	Labour and Industries
Bezawada Gopala Reddy	Local Administration
T. S. S. Rajan	Public Health and Religious Endowments
Maulana Yakub Hasan Sait	Public Works
V. I. Munuswamy Pillai	Agriculture and Rural Development
S. Ramanathan Pillai	Public Information and Administration Reports
Kongattil Raman Menon	Courts and Prisons

Changes

- On 7 January 1939, Raman Menon died and V. J. Varkey was inducted into the cabinet. Education portfolio was transferred from Subbarayan to Varkey and instead Subbarayan was given additional charge of Courts and Prisons.

== Impact ==
The 1937 elections marked the start of the Indian National Congress' participation in the governance of India. In the Madras Presidency, it also marked the beginning of Rajaji's ascendancy in the Congress Legislature Party. Though it was Satyamurti who had led the election campaign, he gave up the leadership of the Legislature to Rajaji in accordance to the wishes of the Congress High Command in Delhi. This election also marked the beginning of Congress dominance in the politics of Madras Presidency and later the Madras State. Except for an interlude during 1939–46, the Congress would go on to rule Madras uninterrupted till 1967. The Justice Party was demoralized by its defeat and the Raja of Bobbili temporarily retired from active politics. The party remained in political wilderness and eventually came under the control of Periyar E. V. Ramasamy in 1938 and transformed into the Dravidar Kazhagam in 1944.

== See also ==
- 1937 Madras Presidency legislative assembly election
