= Chief ministership of C. Rajagopalachari =

Political position of C. Rajagopalachari

C. Rajagopalachari (a.k.a. Rajaji) was the prime minister of the erstwhile Madras Presidency and the chief minister of Madras State of Independent India. He was the first Indian National Congress member to assume office in the Madras presidency. He served as the head of government for two terms spanning about five years. He was elected as a prime minister after 1937 elections in Madras Presidency and served until 1939. He was also the chief minister of Madras State after the first elections held after Indian independence. His second term lasted from 1952 to 1954.

== First term ==
=== Election win ===
Elections to the Madras legislative assembly and legislative council were conducted in 1937. These were the first election conducted after the creation of a bicameral legislature by Government of India Act of 1935. Indian National Congress won 159 of the 215 seats in the assembly and 27 of the 56 seats in the council. Despite being the majority party in the Assembly and the Council, the Congress was hesitant to form a government. Their objections stemmed from the special powers given to the governor by the Government of India Act of 1935. According to the act, the governor was given special responsibilities in the area of finance and control and absolute discretionary powers over the cabinet in certain other issues. The governor had the power to overrule the cabinet. The Congress refused to accept power (in all the six provinces where they had won) with such caveats.

The governor of Madras, Lord Erskine, decided to form an interim provisional government with non-members and opposition members of the Legislative Assembly. V. S. Srinivasa Sastri was first offered the prime ministership of the interim government, but he refused to accept it. Eventually an interim government was formed with Kurma Venkata Reddy Naidu of the Justice Party as prime minister on 1 April 1937. Congress leaders like S. Satyamurti were apprehensive about the decision to not accept power. They carried out a campaign to convince Congress High Command (Mohandas K. Gandhi and Jawaharlal Nehru) to accept power within the limitations set by the Government of India Act. They also appealed to the British government to give assurances that the governor's special powers will not be misused. On 22 June, Viceroy Linlithgow issued a statement expressing the British Government's desire to work with the Congress in implementing the 1935 Act.

On 1 July, the Congress Working Committee (CWC) agreed to form governments in the provinces they had won. On 14 July, Rajaji was sworn in as the prime minister.

=== Cabinet ===
Council of Ministers in Rajagopalachari's cabinet (15 July 1937 – 29 October 1939):

Minister	Portfolio
C. Rajagopalachari	Prime Minister, Public and Finance
T. Prakasam	Revenue
P. Subbarayan	Law and Education
V. V. Giri	Labour and Industries
Bezawada Gopala Reddy	Local Administration
T. S. S. Rajan	Public Health and Religious Endowments
Maulana Yakub Hasan Sait	Public Works
V. I. Munuswamy Pillai	Agriculture and Rural Development
S. Ramanathan	Public Information and Administration Reports
Kongattil Raman Menon	Courts and Prisons
C. J. Varkey, Chunkath	Education

Changes

- On 7 January 1939, Raman Menon died and C. J. Varkey, was inducted into the cabinet. Education portfolio was transferred from Subbarayan to Varkey and instead Subbarayan was given additional charge of Courts and Prisons.

=== Prohibition ===
Rajaji introduced The Prohibition Act in September 1937. This was the first time it was ever introduced in India. In order to offset the loss of revenue, he also introduced sales tax for the first time. The Act penalised manufacture, traffic in and consumption of liquor and intoxicating drugs in areas of Presidency it was introduced. It was first introduced in his home district of Salem on 1 October 1937. It was to be expanded to Chittoor and Cuddapah districts on 1 October 1938 and to North Arcot district on 1 October 1939. A provision was included in the bill at the insistence of the governor that British officials to be exempted from the prohibition. The government had a system to grant permits to individuals who consume foreign liquor. The governor had given an order that all Europeans who applied for liquor licenses to be granted one. People could travel to areas in the presidency where the prohibition was not enforced for consumption of liquor. There was a system to regulate licensed clubs, wine for religious purposes in churches, and brandy in hospitals for medical purposes. Licenses were also given for toddy tapping.

=== Temple Entry Act ===
Rajaji, who initially supported the idea of a Temple Entry Bill proposed by M. C. Raja in January 1938, later supported the passage of Malabar Temple Entry Act. The Act paved the wave for entry of Harijans in temple in Malabar regions if the caste Hindus in the particular area did not object to it. M. C. Raja filed a complaint to Gandhi in disappointment to this modified Act ... His government later passed Temple Entry Authorisation and Indemnity Act in 1939.

== Second term ==
=== Election win ===
The 1952 election, the first election in Tamil Nadu after Indian independence, produced no party with a clear majority. However, Indian National Congress emerged as the biggest party. Rajaji was invited by Sri Prakasa to form the government on 1 April 1952 and was sworn in on 10 April 1952. He refused to run for a by-election and the governor nominated him for the assembly's upper house (legislative council). In July 1952 he was able to win a vote of confidence with the support of 200 members with 151 opposing the confidence motion.

=== Cabinet ===
Minister	Portfolio
C. Rajagopalachari	Chief Minister, Public and Police
A. B. Shetty	Health
C. Subramaniam	Finance, Food and Elections
K. Venkataswamy Naidu	Religious Endowments and Registration
N. Ranga Reddi	Public Works
M. V. Krishna Rao [Mallavarapu Krishna Rao]	Education, Harijan Uplift and Information
V. C. Palanisami Gounder	Prohibition
U. Krishna Rao	Industries, Labour, Motor Transport, Railways, Posts, Telegraphs and Civil Aviation
R. Nagana Goud	Agriculture, Forests, veterinary, Animal Husbandry, Fisheries and Cinchona
N. Sankara Reddi	Local Administration
M. A. Manickavelu Naicker	Land Revenue
K. P. Kuttikrishnan Nair	Courts, Prisons and Legal Department
Raja Sri Shanmuga Rajeswara Sethupathi	House Rent Control
S. B. B. Pattabirama Rao	Rural Welfare, Commercial Taxes and Scheduled areas
D. Sanjeevayya	Cooperation and Housing

Changes

- The portfolios of Agriculture, Forests, Fisheries, Cin-chona, Rural Welfare, Community Projects and National Extension Schemes were handed over to M. Bhaktavatsalam on 9 October 1953.
- C. Subramaniam was given the additional portfolios of education, information and publicity.
- V. C. Palaniswamy Gounder was put in charge of Veterinary, Animal Husbandry and Harijan welfare.

=== Modified Scheme of Elementary Education ===
The Modified Scheme of Elementary Education or New Scheme of Elementary Education or Madras Scheme of Elementary Education called by its critics as Kula Kalvi Thittam (Hereditary Education Policy), was an abortive attempt at education reform introduced by the Indian National Congress Government of the Madras State, led by C. Rajagopalachari (Rajaji) in 1953. The scheme proposed the introduction of two shifts or sessions in elementary schools. In one session regular teaching would be done and during the second session, the students would be sent home to learn the occupations of their parents or attached to a farmer or a craftsman in the village. It became controversial and was accused of being a casteist scheme to perpetuate the caste hierarchy. The opposition to the scheme was led by the Dravida Munnetra Kazhagam (DMK). Public opposition and internal dissent within the congress led to the deferment of the scheme. The discontent it triggered among the Congress legislature members forced the resignation of Rajaji as Chief Minister. The scheme was dropped completely by Rajaji's successor Kamaraj in 1954.
