= Rukmini Lakshmipathi =

Indian independence activist and politician

- ருக்மிணி லட்சுமிபதி
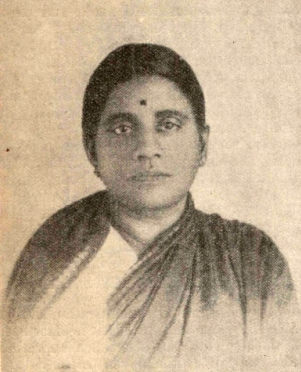
- Photograph of Rukmini Lakshmipathi from Modern Review (March 1936)

Deputy Speaker of the Madras Legislative Assembly
- In office 15 July 1937 – 29 October 1939 / 1942
- Speaker: Bulusu Sambamurti
- Preceded by: Office established
- Succeeded by: Chodagam Ammanna Raja (1946-52)

Minister for Public Health, Madras Province
- In office 1 May 1946 – 23 March 1947
- Prime Minister: Tanguturi Prakasam (1946-47)
- Preceded by: R. M. Palat (1937); T. S. S. Rajan (1937-39)
- Succeeded by: A. B. Shetty (1947-49)

Member of Madras Legislative Council
- In office November 1934 – January 1937
- Chairperson: B. Ramachandra Reddi (1930-37)

Member of Madras Legislative Assembly
- In office March 1937 – 29 October 1939 / 1942
- Speaker: Bulusu Sambamurti

Personal details
- Born: 6 December 1892 Madras, Madras Presidency, British India (now Chennai, Tamil Nadu, India)
- Died: 6 August 1951 (aged 58)
- Party: Indian National Congress
- Spouse: Achanta Lakshmipathi
- Relatives: Raja T. Ramrao (grandfather)
- Education: Women's Christian College, Madras (B.A.)
- Occupation: Veena player, social activist, politician
- Known for: first female prisoner in the Salt Satyagraha movement; first (and only) woman minister of the British-era Madras Province

Rukmini Laxmipathi (also spelled as Rukmani Lakshmipathi; 6 December 1892 – 6 August 1951) was an Indian independence activist and politician belonging to the Indian National Congress. She was the first woman to be elected to the Madras Legislature and the first to serve as a minister in the Madras Presidency.

== Biography ==
=== Early life, education, and marriage ===
Rukmini was born on 6 December 1892 into an agriculturist family from Madras. Her grandfather was the landlord Raja T. Ramrao.

She obtained her B.A from the Women's Christian College, Madras and married Dr. Achanta Lakshmipathi.

=== Socio-political career ===
She was secretary of the Madras branch of the Bharat Stree Mahamandal (The Great Circle of Indian Women). In 1923, she joined the Congress. In 1926, she attended the International Women's Suffrage Alliance Congress at Paris as the Indian representative.

For her participation (in 1930) in the Salt Satyagraha in Vedaranyam she was jailed for a year, becoming the first female prisoner in the Salt Satyagraha movement. She had walked the entire distance from Tiruchirapalli to Vedaranyam.

She contested and won a by election to the Madras Legislative Council in 1934.

She was elected to the Madras Presidency Legislative Assembly in the 1937 elections. On 15 July 1937 she was elected as the Deputy Speaker of the assembly. During 1 May 1946 – 23 March 1947, she was the Minister for Public Health of the Province in the T. Prakasam cabinet. She was the first (and only) woman minister of the Province.

=== Death ===
She died on 6 August 1951.

== Legacy ==
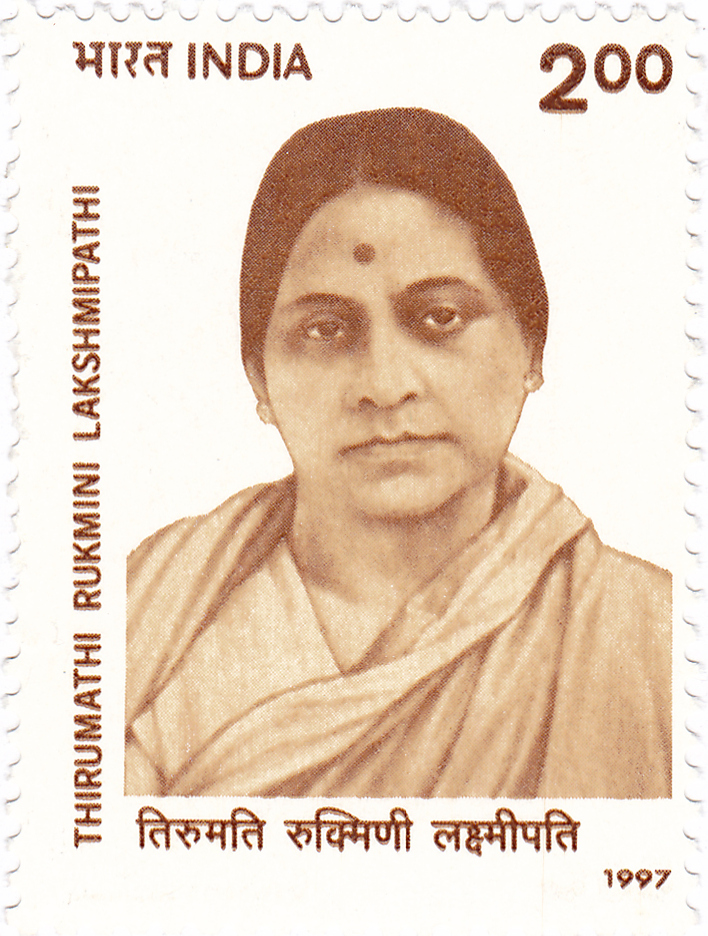
Rukmini Lakshmipathi on a stamp of India (6 August 1997)

Marshall's road in Egmore, Chennai has been renamed after her.

In her memory, a postage stamp of India was issued in 1997.
