= N. Gopala Menon =

Indian politician and lawyer

N. Gopala Menon was an Indian lawyer and politician of the Indian National Congress, also Member of the Legislative Assembly of Madras state. He served as the Speaker of the Madras Legislative Assembly from 1955 to 1956.

Soon after the untimely death of his father (Ulanat Mootha Pannicker, a chieftain of the Zamorin of Calicut), Gopala Menon's mother with her six small children moved to Madras (the erstwhile Madras Presidency ). Gopala Menon did his schooling and higher studies in the Madras Christian College High School and graduate studies at Madras Christian College and the Law College, Madras. After qualifying in Law, he joined the Legal firm of Sir Kurma Venkata Reddy Naidu who became his mentor. Sir KV Reddy, was the first Indian to be appointed Governor of a Presidency, when he became the Governor of the Madras Presidency in June 1936.

Gopala Menon set up his private law practice in Madras in the early 1920s, getting a good start from the extensive practice of Sir Reddy, a part of which was turned over to him.

Always a person who was sympathetic to the conditions of the under-privileged, Gopala Menon devoted his legal practice to the requirements of the needy. He virtually adopted a large cluster of poor households in Vepery and Choolai districts for whom he provided free legal service. He represented this Municipal constituency in the Madras Corporation for nearly twenty years from the early 1930s. During his Membership of the Madras Corporation, he was for many terms the Chairman of the Standing Committee on Finance and other important Committees and was elected the Deputy Mayor for a term.

He was elected to the Madras Legislative Assembly in 1952, (see 1952 Madras Legislative Assembly election) from the Ponnani constituency in the South Malabar district of Madras Presidency. This was a landmark victory as in these elections, the Communist Party of India and the Kisan Mazdoor Praja Party had made a strong showing and his was one of only 5 victories for the INC out of 31 constituencies in what later became Kerala state.

In September 1955 he was elected as Speaker of the Legislative Assembly of Madras State (see List of speakers of the Tamil Nadu Legislative Assembly), the precursor of the present Tamil Nadu state. He was only the second person to occupy this office, following the first ever Speaker of the newly created Madras State J. Shivashanmugam Pillai who served from May 1952 to August 1955.

He published a book on Parliamentary Practices, which served as a handbook for newly elected lawmakers, who were unfamiliar with the subject.

N. Gopala Menon died on 9 February 1972.
