= S. Ramanathan =

S. Ramanathan may refer to

- S. Ramanathan (politician) (1895–1970)
- S. Ramanathan (musician) (1917–1988)
- S. Ramanathan (film director) (1929–2013)
- S. R. Nathan (1924–2016)
