= List of speakers of the Tamil Nadu Legislative Assembly =

Presiding officer of TN state legislative assembly

Speaker of Tamil Nadu Legislative Assembly
- Emblem of Tamil Nadu
- Incumbent; J. C. D. Prabhakar since 12 May 2026
- Member of: Tamil Nadu Legislative Assembly
- Appointer: Members of the assembly
- Term length: Term of the assembly (five years maximum)
- Inaugural holder: J. Shivashanmugam Pillai (Note: As speaker of the Madras Legislative Assembly. Madras state was renamed as Tamil Nadu in 1969.); Pulavar K. Govindan
- Deputy: M. Ravisankar

The Speaker is the presiding officer of the Tamil Nadu Legislative Assembly, the main law-making body for the Indian state of Tamil Nadu. The speaker is elected by the members of the assembly, from amongst them.

== President of the Madras Legislative Council ==
Madras Legislative Council, the first representative legislature for the Madras Presidency was established in December 1920. The presiding officer of the council was known as the president. P. Rajagopalachari was nominated as the first president and took office on 17 December 1920.

The Speaker's Chair bears an inscription reading “Presented by Lord Willingdon of Ratton, Governor of Madras”, commemorating the artistic teakwood chair presented by Lord Willingdon and Lady Willingdon as a personal gift on March 6, 1922, to the President of the Madras Legislative Council. Its design closely resembles the Speaker's Chair in the British House of Commons, and it has been used continuously across generations of democratic assemblies.

No.	Name	Image	Assumed office	Left office
1	P. Rajagopalachari		December 1920	February 1925
2	L. D. Swamikannu Pillai		February 1925	September 1925
3	M. Ratnaswami		September 1925	1926
4	C. V. S. Narasimha Raju		1926	1930
5	B. Ramachandra Reddi		1930	1937

== Chairman of Madras Legislative Council ==
The Government of India Act 1935 enabled the introduction of provincial autonomy in 1937, and the Madras Legislative Council became the upper chamber of a bicameral legislature. The presiding officer of the council was called as the chairman of the council. This agreement continued after Indian Independence till the abolition of the council in 1986.

No.	Name	Image	Took office	Left office	Political party
1	U. Rama Rao		1937	1945	INC
2	R. B. Ramakrishna Raju		1946	1952	INC
3	P. V. Cherian		1952	20 April 1964	INC
4	M. A. Manickavelu Naicker		1964	1970	INC
5	C. P. Chitrarasu		1970	1976	DMK
6	M. P. Sivagnanam		1976	1986	TAK

== Speaker of the Legislative Assembly of Madras Presidency ==
The Madras Legislative Assembly was established as a part of the bicameral legislature in 1937. The presiding officer of the assembly was known as the speaker.

No.	Name	Image	Took office	Left office	Political Party	Deputy Speaker
1	Bulusu Sambamurti		1937	1942	INC	Rukmini Lakshmipathi
–	Vacant (Note: Elections were not held in 1942 and no assembly was constituted during 1942-46)		1942	1946		
2	J. Shivashanmugam Pillai		1946	1952	INC	Chodagam Ammanna Raja

== Speaker of the Legislative Assembly of Madras State ==
Madras State, the precursor to the present day state of Tamil Nadu, was created after India became a republic on 26 January 1950. It comprised present-day Tamil Nadu and parts of present-day Andhra Pradesh, Karnataka and Kerala. The first legislature of the Madras State to be elected on the basis of universal suffrage was constituted on 1 March 1952, after the general elections held in January 1952.

No.	Name	Image	Took office	Left office	Time in office	Political party	Deputy Speaker
1	J. Shivashanmugam Pillai		6 May 1952	16 August 1955	3 years, 102 days	INC	B. Baktavatsalu Naidu
2	N. Gopala Menon		27 September 1955	1 November 1956	1 year, 35 days	INC	B. Baktavatsalu Naidu
3	U. Krishna Rao		30 April 1957	3 August 1961	4 years, 95 days	INC	B. Baktavatsalu Naidu
4	S. Chellapandian		31 March 1962	14 March 1967	4 years, 348 days	INC	K. Parthasarathi
5	S. P. Adithanar		17 March 1967	12 August 1968	1 year, 148 days	DMK	Pulavar K. Govindan

== Speaker of the Tamil Nadu Legislative Assembly ==
Madras State was renamed as Tamil Nadu in January 1969.

No.	Name	Image	Took office	Left office	Time in office	Political party	Deputy Speaker
1	Pulavar K. Govindan		22 February 1969	14 March 1971	2 years, 20 days	DMK	G. R. Edmund
2	K. A. Mathiazagan		24 March 1971	2 December 1972	1 year, 253 days	DMK	P. Seenivasan
–	P. Seenivasan (acting)		2 December 1972	3 August 1973	244 days	DMK	
(1)	Pulavar K. Govindan		3 August 1973	3 July 1977	3 years, 334 days	DMK	N. Ganapathy
4	Munu Adhi		6 July 1977	18 June 1980	2 years, 348 days	AIADMK	S. Thirunavukkarasu
5	K. Rajaram		21 June 1980	24 February 1985	4 years, 248 days	AIADMK	P. H. Pandian
6	P. H. Pandian		27 February 1985	5 February 1989	3 years, 344 days	AIADMK	V. P. Balasubramanian
7	M. Tamilkudimagan		8 February 1989	30 June 1991	2 years, 142 days	DMK	V. P. Duraisamy
8	Sedapatti R. Muthiah		3 July 1991	21 May 1996	4 years, 323 days	AIADMK	K. Ponnuswamy (1991-1993)
8	Sedapatti R. Muthiah		3 July 1991	21 May 1996	4 years, 323 days	AIADMK	S. Gandhirajan (1993-1996)
9	P. T. R. Palanivel Rajan		23 May 1996	21 May 2001	4 years, 363 days	DMK	Parithi Ilamvazhuthi
10	K. Kalimuthu		24 May 2001	1 February 2006	4 years, 253 days	AIADMK	A. Arunachalam
–	A. Arunachalam (acting)		1 February 2006	12 May 2006	100 days	AIADMK	
11	R. Avudaiappan		19 May 2006	15 May 2011	4 years, 361 days	DMK	V. P. Duraisamy
12	D. Jayakumar		27 May 2011	29 September 2012	1 year, 125 days	AIADMK	P. Dhanapal
13	P. Dhanapal		10 October 2012	3 May 2021	8 years, 205 days	AIADMK	V. Jayaraman
14	M. Appavu		12 May 2021	10 May 2026	4 years, 363 days	DMK	K. Pitchandi
15	J. C. D. Prabhakar		12 May 2026	Incumbent	118 days	TVK	M. Ravisankar

== Pro-tem speaker of Tamil Nadu Legislative Assembly ==
A Pro-tem Speaker is the most senior member of the house (mostly a member of the ruling party ally) appointed to preside over the first sittings under Article 180(1) and Article 188 of the Constitution of India to administer oaths to newly elected MLAs of a newly elected legislative house until a permanent speaker is chosen shortly. "Pro-tem" comes from the Latin phrase pro tempore, which means "for the time being".

No.	Name	Image	Term	Political party
1	A. S. Ponnammal		1989, 1991	INC
2	A. S. Ponnammal		1996	INC
3	M. Abdul Lathief		2001	INL
4	D. Sudarsanam		2006	INC
5	C. K. Thamizharasan		2011	RPI
6	S. Semmalai		2016	AIADMK
7	K. Pitchandi		2021	DMK
8	M. V. Karuppaiah		2026	TVK
