= Grandhi Venkata Reddy Naidu =

Indian politician

Personal details
- Born: 18 June 1885 Narasapuram, Madras Presidency, British India
- Died: 1 June 1967 (aged 81) India
- Party: Justice Party
- Other political affiliations: Indian National Congress

Grandhi Venkata Reddy Naidu (1885–1967) was an Indian politician and the first Minister of Law for the Andhra Pradesh Legislative Assembly. When Andhra Pradesh became a newly formed state, Neelam Sanjiva Reddy was its first Chief Minister. Grandhi Venkata Reddy Naidu served in his cabinet.

== Early life and education ==
Grandhi Venkata Reddy Naidu (aka Grandhi Venkatareddi and G.V.Reddy Naidu) was born in a Balija family (later became telagas) on 18 June 1885 at Narasapuram, West Godavari District of Andhra Pradesh, India. His father Narasimha Rao was a Land Lord at Narasapuram. His Grandfather Venkata Reddy Naidu was a Munsiff (circa 1840). Grandhi was a follower of K.V.Reddy Naidu.

Grandhi received his B.A and L.L.B degrees from University of Madras, and was called to the bar in 1918, enrolled as an Advocate in the Madras High Court. After practicing law for three decades, he shifted his practice to his birthplace of Narasapuram.

== Career ==
Grandhi spent his early youth in the Indian independence movement. Later he joined the Justice Party. He was the Justice Party President in Godavari District as well as West Godavari District. In 1955 he was elected as a Congress MLA from Narasapuram; and became the first Minister of Law for the state of Andhra Pradesh. He also served as the Minister for Endowments, Law officers, Prisons and Subordinate Courts. He was a Senate and Syndicate Member in Madras University and Andhra University. He was draft committee member in various state government acts. He was a Draft committee Chairman of Dowry prohibition Act, an act introduced in the assembly in September 1956. He established subordinate courts in Visalandhra, and schools in West Godavari District.
