= Chunkath Joseph Varkey =

Indian professor, journalist, and politician

Chunkath Joseph Varkey (1891–1953), was an Indian professor, journalist and a former Minister for Education of the Madras Presidency.

== Biography ==
Varkey was born in a Syro-Malabar Catholic family in 1891. He was a professor of History St. Aloysius College, Mangalore. He was also the Secretary of the All India Catholic League, now the All India Catholic Union. He represented the West Coast Indian Christian Constituency in the Madras Legislative Assembly during 1937–42. He was also the founder-editor of The Catholic Educational Review. When the C. Rajagopalachari led Indian National Congress took power in the Madras Presidency after winning the 1937 elections, Varkey became Secretary for Education. In 1939 he succeeded Subbarayan as the Minister of Education - a post he held till the resignation of the Congress ministry the same year. He organised the All India Catholic League and was made a Knight of St. Gregory by Pope Pius XI.
