= Anjalai Ammal =

Indian freedom fighter, social worker, reformer and politician

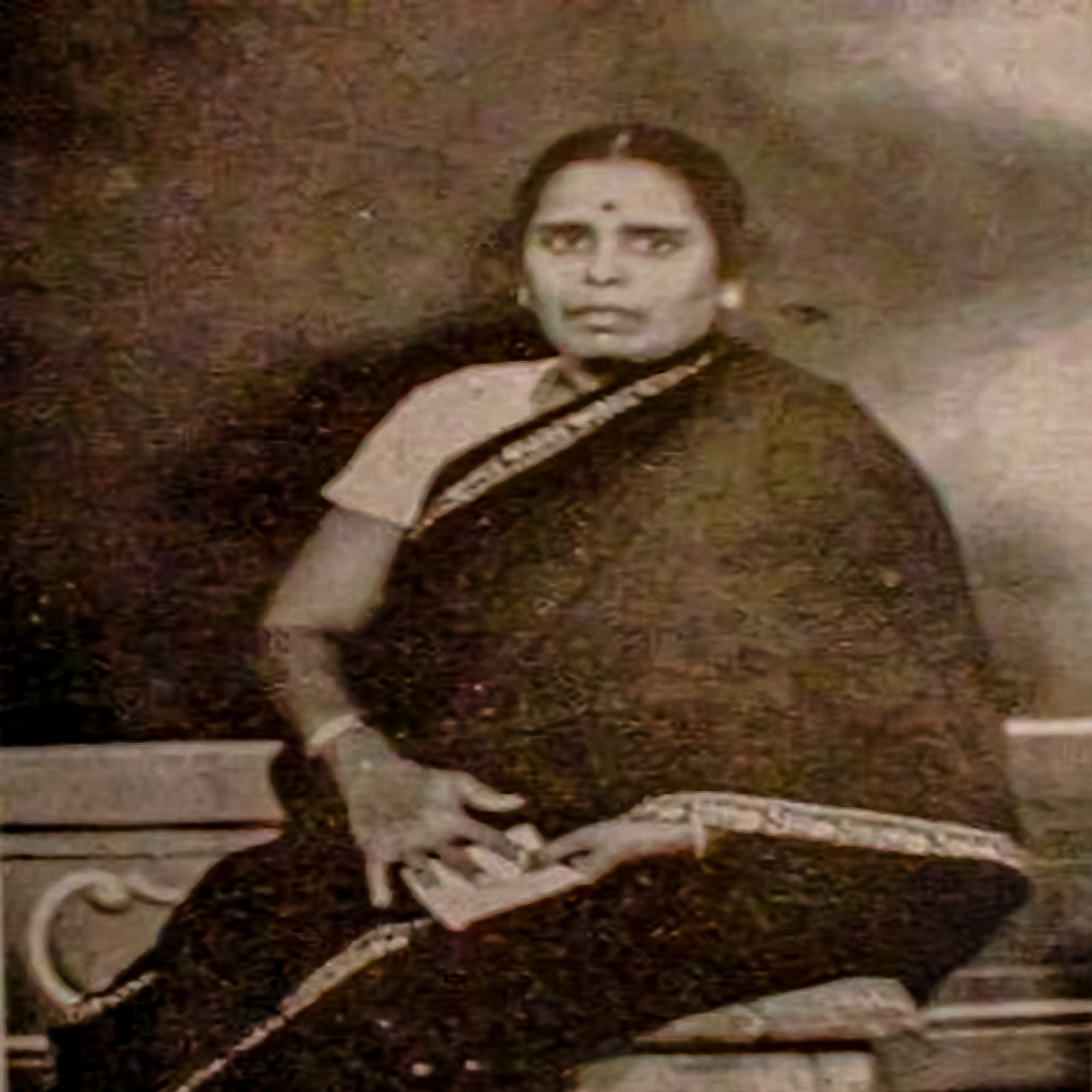
Anjalai Ammal

Anjalai Ammal Murugappan padaiyatchi was an Indian freedom fighter, social worker, reformer and politician from Cuddalore, Tamil Nadu. She spent seven and a half years in prison for her participation in the independence movement. She was among the early women to be elected to the Tamil Nadu State legislature, serving as a Congress MLA following her election victories in 1937 and 1946.

== Biography ==
She started her political activism in 1921 with the Non-cooperation movement and later took part in the Neil Statue Satyagraha, Salt Satyagraha and Quit India Movement. Her courage was so well known that Mahatma Gandhi called her "Jhansi Rani of South India". When Gandhi came to Kadalur to meet Anjalai Ammal, the British government prohibited him their meet. But Anjalai Ammal still managed to meet him by dressing up in a burqa. She also encouraged her nine-year-old daughter to participate in the protests, who was named Leelavathy by Gandhi himself.

Granddaughter of Anjalai Ammal, Mangai A, explains, “My grandmother, Anjalai Ammal was in jail for more than four and half years and she gave birth to her last son in the jail itself. Her biography is included in the Class 8 second semester Tamil textbook. My grandfather, Murugappa, my maternal aunt, Leelavathy, and her husband, Jamadhagni, were also freedom fighters.”

In 1930, Anjalai Ammal was arrested for picketing shops on Godown Street in Madras to protest against foreign goods. At her court hearing, she defended herself, denying guilt and accusing the police of treating the protesters harshly.

In 1931, she presided over The All India Women Congress Meet. In 1932, she took part in another struggle for which she was sent to Vellore prison. She was pregnant while she was sent to Vellore prison. She was released on bail on account of her delivery. Within two weeks after her son was born, she was sent back to the Vellore prison. After India's independence in 1947, she was elected as the member of the Tamil Nadu legislative assembly thrice.

She died on 20 February 1961.
