= P. M. Audikesavalu Naicker =

Indian freedom fighter & legislator (1898–1964)

Sardar P. M. Audikesavalu Naicker

Member of Provisional Parliament of India
- In office 1950–1952

Deputy Mayor of Madras
- In office 1939–1940
- Leader: S. Satyamurti

Member of Madras Legislative Assembly
- In office 1937–1939
- Constituency: North Madras

Municipal Councillor
- In office 1936–1946
- Constituency: Korukkupet

Personal details
- Born: 9 September 1898; Korukkupet, Madras (now Chennai)
- Died: 9 September 1964 (aged 66)

Sardar P. M. Audikesavalu Naicker (9 September 1898 – 9 September 1964) was an Indian freedom fighter, and legislator active in the Madras Presidency during the Indian independence movement.

== Early life ==
P. M. Audikesavalu Naicker was born on 9 September 1898 in Korukkupet, Madras (now Chennai). His grandfather, Krishnaswamy Naicker, was a shell lime merchant who had migrated from Pondicherry to Madras due to unrest under French colonial rule. The family established itself in Korukkupet, where Audikesavalu grew up as the third of five sons. Naicker received his early education locally and later attended Madras Christian College.

== Labour movement ==
Naicker's involvement in the labour movement began in 1916 when he founded and became the president of the Madras & Southern Mahratta Railway Young Men's Trade Union. He also organized and led several other unions, including the Massey & Company Employees’ Union and the Madras Kerosene Oil Workers’ Union. In 1917, he led a strike by the North Madras Workers’ Union, which is considered one of the earliest recorded strikes in Madras.

Naicker was also involved with major trade unions such as the Madras Labour Union (established in 1918), considered one of the earliest trade unions in India, and other unions in industries such as tramways, public works, and manufacturing.

== Role in the Indian independence movement ==
From 1920 to 1925, he served as Secretary of the Madras District Congress Committee, working to expand the Congress Party's influence in the Madras and Chingleput districts.

He participated in the 1928 protests against the Simon Commission and was injured during a police crackdown. During the Civil Disobedience Movement and the Salt Satyagraha in the 1930s, Naicker faced imprisonment for his involvement in satyagraha demonstrations. His leadership and courage during these events earned him the honorary title "Sardar," reportedly bestowed by Gandhi.

In 1933, he was the president of the North Madras Harijan Welfare Association when M. P. Sivagnanam was its secretary. Naicker was also jailed during the Quit India Movement in 1942 and for opposing India's participation in World War II.

== Legislative career ==
Naicker served as a Municipal Councillor for Korukkupet from 1936 to 1939 and again from 1940 to 1946. He also held the position of Deputy Mayor of Madras from 1939 to 1940. He represented North Madras in the Madras Legislative Assembly from 1937 to 1939.

In post-independence India, Naicker was nominated to the Provisional Indian Parliament (1950–1952) and contributed to the drafting of the Indian Constitution as a member of the Drafting Committee.

== Death ==
He died on 9 September 1964.
