= S. Ramanathan (politician) =

Indian politician

Minister of Madras Presidency
- In office 1937–1939

Personal details
- Born: December 12, 1895
- Died: March 9, 1970 (aged 74)

Somasundaram Ramanathan (30 December 1895 – 9 March 1970) was an Indian politician who served as the minister of Madras Presidency in the Congress-led government of 1937. He was the first founder of the Self-Respect Movement.

== Early life ==
S. Ramanathan was born on 30 December 1895 to Mrs. Nagarathinam and Mr. Somasundaram as eldest among male siblings amongst total seven siblings in Kodavillagam, near Mayiladuthurai in Tanjore District, Madras Presidency, British India (present day Mayiladuthurai district, Tamil Nadu, India). He was educated at Pachaiyappa's College, Madras Christian College and Madras Law College.

== Political career ==
S. Ramanathan joined the Indian National Congress to participate in Indian independence movement during his college years. As a follower of Mahatma Gandhi, he was involved in the promotion of Khadi in Madras. He was arrested during the Non-cooperation movement for his participation.

In 1922, when some members of the Congress decided to contest the elections, they formed the Swaraj Party. Some Brahmins in Madras, led by Rajagopalachari, welcomed the move, but a group of non-Brahmins, led by E. V. Ramasamy (later known popularly as Periyar after 1938) and Ramanathan, opposed it. In the party meeting of 1925, Ramanathan proposed a resolution, on behalf of Ramasamy, for proportional representation to the non-Brahmins but it failed.

After the failure of the resolution, Ramanathan founded the Self-Respect Movement to safeguard the interests of non-Brahmins. He became the secretary and invited Ramasamy to take the leadership of the movement. He felt that Gandhi was favouring Brahmins in the Congress and he opposed the Gandhi's views on varnashrama dharma (caste system in India). In September 1927, Ramanathan and Ramasamy met Gandhi to solve the issues but it did not make any impact on both sides. In the same year, he left the Congress party. The English newspaper named Revolt was started in 1928 with Ramanathan as its editor to propagate ideas of the Self-Respect Movement.

Ramanathan and E.V.Ramasamy went on a tour of the Soviet Union and Europe in 1931–1932. During their stay in Soviet Union, according to Anaimuthu, a follower of Ramasamy, they were scheduled to meet with Soviet dictator Joseph Stalin on 28 May 1932. However, "Ramanathan's contact with Trotskyites had infuriated the apparatchiks and they were therefore asked to leave immediately". In London, Ramanathan translated Lenin's On Religion into Tamil, which was later published in Kudi Arasu, a Tamil weekly magazine.

Ramanathan rejoined the Indian National Congress in 1934. He was elected from the Mayavaram constituency in 1937 Madras Presidency Legislative Assembly election. He became the Minister for Public Information and Administration Reports in the Rajagopalachari cabinet of 1937–1939. In 1947, he wrote a book titled Gandhi and the Youth, in which he had criticized ideas of Gandhi on caste and Khadi.

S.Ramanathan has also accompanied with E.V.R to the Vaikom Protest held in Travancore in 1924; During his socio-political life, he made several friends in the political circle cutting across all walks of life. S.Ramanathan has even brought M.K.Gandhi to his home village Kodavillagam during one of M.K.G's tour of South India.

S.Ramanathan's commercial interest in personal life span from arts to Silk Screen Printing for which he has brought the technology from Russia to establish Silk Screen Printing as the pioneer in India; he also had interests in Commercial poultry farming.

He retired from active politics in the late 1950s and died on 9 March 1970. His funeral in Madras was well attended by C. Rajagopalachari, Kamarajar, E.V.Ramasamy. His death was condoled in Tamil Nadu Legislative Assembly on Saturday 14 March 1970 by a silent condolence and adjournment of assembly for 15 minutes.

== In popular culture ==
Ramanathan is portrayed by Vagai Chandrasekhar in Ramasamy's biopic Periyar (2007).
