= P. Khalifulla Sahib =

Indian politician

Diwan Bahadur P. Kalifulla Sahib Khan Bahadur

Diwan of Pudukkottai
- In office 1941–1947
- Monarch: Rajagopala Tondaiman
- Preceded by: Alexander Tottenham
- Succeeded by: Post Abolished

Personal details
- Born: 1888 Trichinopoly, Madras Presidency, British India (now Tiruchirappalli, Tamil Nadu, India)
- Died: 10 February 1950 (aged 61–62) Pudukkottai, Madras State (now Tamil Nadu), India
- Occupation: Politician, Lawyer, civil service
- Profession: Statesman

Dewan Khan Bahadur P. Khalifullah (1888–1950), was a politician of the Madras Presidency, British India, He was the first muslim minister of Madras Presidency Province, served as the minister for public works in the short-lived ministry of Kurma Venkata Reddy Naidu from April–July 1937. He was belonging to the Rowther community, and his father (T.A. Pitchai Rowther) was a wealthy businessman of Tiruchirapalli. Born in 1888 in Tiruchi into a wealthy rice merchant's family, his birth name was Mohamed Pichai Rowther Ibrahim Khalifullah. He went on to be known by the honorific Khan Bahadur, a title bestowed on him by the British. In later years, his work as the Dewan of Pudukkottai State made him more popular as ‘Dewan Khalifullah.’

== Early life ==
P. Khalifullah's early education was in present-day Tiruchirappalli, and then he did his post-graduation at Madras University. He is thought to be the first south Indian Muslim to obtain a master's degree in 1913. "My father was a man of vision, and was very keen to educate all his sons," says Kutbuddin, his youngest son. "Being educated then was a way to help others in life."

P. Khalifullah decided to study law soon after and sailed for Britain. But it was to be a tragic sojourn as he had to return to India within a month to attend his father's funeral. "The outbreak of the First World War in 1914 put paid to my father’s plans to study law in Britain, so he completed his studies in Madras Law College in 1929 and became an advocate in the Madras High Court," says Kutbuddin.

P. Khalifullah was married when he was 13 years old to Varsaisammal (8), and the couple had 12 children.

== Social attributes ==
"My father never pampered any of his family members," says Kutbuddin. "Every year, he would stitch clothes for 10–15 street children at the same time and using the same fabric as for his own children," he adds.

"We all loved him, but our relationship with him was a little formal. In fact, his younger brother would not even sit down in his presence, such was the respect he commanded."

The family's ancestral home in Pakkali Street, Bheema Nagar was large, and it was not unusual for at least 50–100 guests to be served a meal there at any given day.

"On the 26th fast of every Ramzan, he used to serve food to thousands of people from 7 p.m. to 11 p.m. Around 350 measures of rice used to be cooked for this annual event. My mother stayed out of the public eye, but she was the one who took charge of the home," says Kutbuddin.

== Political life ==
Elected to Madras Presidency Legislature in 1930 as a Muslim League candidate, P. Khalifullah nurtured an activist side to him.

He was a keen advocate of secular education for Muslims in the south, and was a convenor of the Khilafat Movement (1919–24).

He was the Councillor in the Tiruchirappalli City Municipal Corporation for over 20 years, and also served as its chairman for two terms.

Other highlights in his political career include the membership of the Madras Presidency Legislative Council from 1930 to 1936, and a stint in 1937 as the Public Works Minister under the leadership of K. Venkata Reddy Naidu.

He was personally close to Periyar E.V. Ramasamy, K.A.P. Viswnatham, P.T. Rajan and Sir A.T. Panneerselvam, with political affiliations obviously no impediment to their friendship.

P. Khalifullah was openly supportive of Periyar's Self-Respect movement, though not of its atheist tenets.

He was a vocal opponent of the introduction of compulsory Hindi lessons in the south, and with Periyar, flagged off the 100 Anti-Hindi Volunteers march in 1938. Later on, though, he dissociated himself from the demand for a separate ‘Dravida Nadu’ by the Dravidian Movement as also Mohamed Ali Jinnah's move for partition. He belonged to the All-India Muslim League and was elected to the Madras Legislative Assembly from Tiruchirappalli in the 1937 elections. He was sympathetic to the cause of Periyar E. V. Ramasamy (Periyar) and his Self-Respect Movement. In 1937, he spoke against the introduction of compulsory Hindi classes in the Madras legislature and later participated in the anti-Hindi agitation started by Periyar. He was a lawyer by profession and was known by his honorifics as Khan Bahadur P. Khalifulla Sahib Bahadur. He was also a member of the Madras Legislative Council during the early 1930s. He was the Dewan of Pudukottai after his withdrawal from political work.
