= K. R. Karanth =

Indian politician

Kota Ramakrishna Karanth (1 May 1894 - 1 February 1980) was an Indian lawyer and politician who served as the Minister of Land Revenue for the Madras Presidency from 1 March 1946 to 23 March 1947. He was the elder brother of noted Kannada novelist K. Shivarama Karanth.

== Early life and education ==
Karanth was born on 1 May 1894 in Parampalli near Udupi, South Canara district of the Madras Presidency. His father was Shesha Karanth and Lakshmamma was his mother. His early childhood was influenced by his father who, as a teacher at the beginning and later as an elder of his village, was a well-respected personality. He graduated from Central College, Bangalore in 1916 and studied law at the Bombay Law School graduating in 1918.

== Tenure as minister ==
During Karanth's tenure as Minister of Land Revenue, the Telangana Uprising broke out in the northern part of the Presidency. Soon afterwards, there were peasant rebellions in Tanjore district. Karanth toured the district and advised the mirasidars to adjust with the changing times and provide better wages to farm labourers.
