= L. Krishnaswami Bharathi =

Indian freedom fighter, politician (1904–1999)

Member of the Constituent Assembly of India
- In office 1946–1950
- Constituency: Madras State

Member of the Provisional Parliament of India
- In office 1950–1952
- Constituency: Madras State

Member of the Madras Legislative Assembly
- In office 1937–1943

Personal details
- Born: 26 July 1904 Tinnevelly, Tamil Nadu, British India
- Died: 31 October 1999 (aged 95) Chennai, Tamil Nadu, India
- Party: Indian National Congress
- Spouse: Lakshmi Bharathi
- Children: K. Lakshmi Kanthan Bharathi
- Occupation: Advocate, Politician

L. Krishnaswami Bharathi (26 July 1904 – 31 October 1999) was an Indian freedom fighter, politician and parliamentarian from Tamil Nadu who served as a member of the Constituent Assembly of India from 1946 to 1950, representing the erstwhile Madras State. He became a member of the Provisional Parliament from 1950 to 1952, again representing the same region. He was a Congress leader and advocate of Gandhian values who contributed to the official language issue in the Constituent Assembly.

== Biography ==
He was born on 26 July 1904 in Tinnevelly, Tamil Nadu. He received his education at Hindu College, Tinnevelly, and Presidency College, Madras. Bharathi then pursued law at both Trivandrum Law College and Madras Law College, qualifying as an advocate at the Madras High Court in 1928. He was an advocate by profession.

Bharathi joined the Indian National Congress in 1930 and participated in the Indian independence movement. He was imprisoned for his involvement in the Satyagraha movements of 1932 and 1940. He was elected to the Madras Legislative Assembly in 1937.

He participated in the Civil Disobedience Movement alongside his wife and was sentenced to six months of rigorous imprisonment.

Bharathi became part of the Constituent Assembly of India representing Madras on a Congress Party ticket. In 1937, he left the Congress party to participate in the anti-Hindi agitation as a protest against making Hindi compulsory in schools.

His contributions included interventions in debates on provincial languages and the principles of Gandhism. He participated in the All-India Language Expert Conference during 1949-50 and played a key role in translating the Constitution of India into Tamil language in 1951.

He held positions on the Road Traffic Board and Debt Conciliation Board for the Government of Madras.

== Personal life ==
He was married to Lakshmi Bharathi, who was also an independence activist who participated in several protests, including the Non-Cooperation Movement, and served time in jail. His son, K. Lakshmi Kanthan Bharathi, was also a freedom fighter and later served as a bureaucrat until his retirement.

== Death ==
He died on 31 October 1999, in Chennai, at the age of 95.
