= K. Varadachari =

Indian lawyer, freedom fighter (1890 – 1963)

- Born: 16 July 1890
- Died: 1 January 1963 (aged 72)
- Other name: Kidambi Varadachari
- Political party: Indian National Congress

K. Varadachari (16 July 1890 – 1 January 1963) was an Indian lawyer, freedom fighter, and politician.

== Early life and education ==
K. Varadachari was born on 16 July 1890. He grew up in Madras and was educated at Tirupathi Devasthanam Hindu High School and Pachiappa's High School. He earned a Bachelor of Arts from Madras Christian College in 1913 and a Bachelor of Law from Madras Law College.

== Legal career ==
Varadachari was admitted to the bar in 1918 and began his career practicing under B. Muniswamy Naidu, before eventually opening his own legal practice.

== Political career ==
Varadachari became an Indian National Congress congressman in 1919. Varadachari was sentenced to a year in prison in 1920 for his participation in the Non-Cooperation Movement. In 1935 Varadachari served on the District Board of Chittoor and the All India Congress Committee. He also served in the Madras Legislative Assembly between 1937 and 1955.

== Death ==
K. Varadachari died on 1 January 1963.
