= K. A. Shanmuga Mudaliar =

Indian educationalist, freedom fighter, and politician

K. A. Shanmuga Mudaliar (2 November 1885 – 17 July 1978) was an Indian educationalist, freedom fighter, and politician. He was former Chairman and former Member of the Legislative Assembly from Tirupattur constituency as a Congress candidate. He worked for the development of education in the Gudiyatham area of Tirupattur. He donated 47 acres of his own land and 5 lakh (500,000) rupees to set up the Government Thirumagal Mill's College.

He served as President of Sengunthar Mahajana Sangam for more than 20 years.

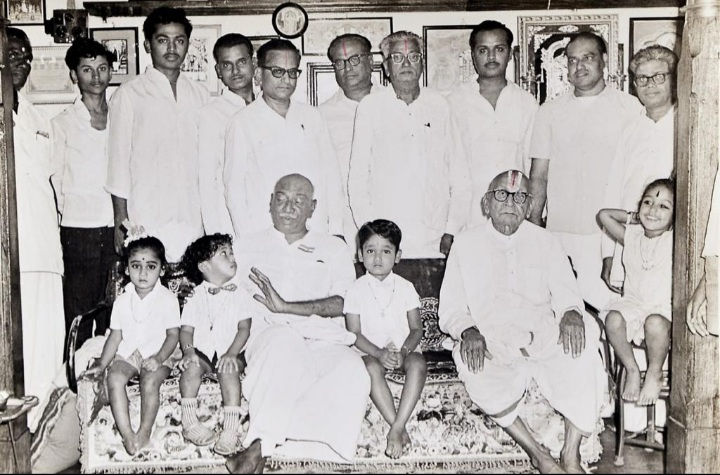
K. A. Shanmuga Mudaliar with K. Kamaraj
