= C. P. Subbiah Mudaliar =

Indian politician and freedom fighter

- Born: Coimbatore
- Died: Sirkazhi
- Occupation(s): Politician, Businessman, Freedom Fighter, Philanthropist

C. P. Subbaiah Mudaliar (also Subbaiah Mudaliar) (August 19, 1895 – March 28, 1967) was a member of Legislative assembly and Indian freedom fighter associated with the Indian National Congress and a protégé of C. Rajagopalachari. He was based in Coimbatore and was influential in the Congress movement in Tamil Nadu. he was former Member of the Legislative Assembly of Madras presidency. He was elected to the Madras legislative assembly as an Indian National Congress candidate from Coimbatore constituency. He also served as vice president of Indian National Congress.
