= A. T. Pannirselvam =

Indian politician (1888–1940)

Rao Bahadur Sir Annasamy Thamaraiselvam Pannirselvam
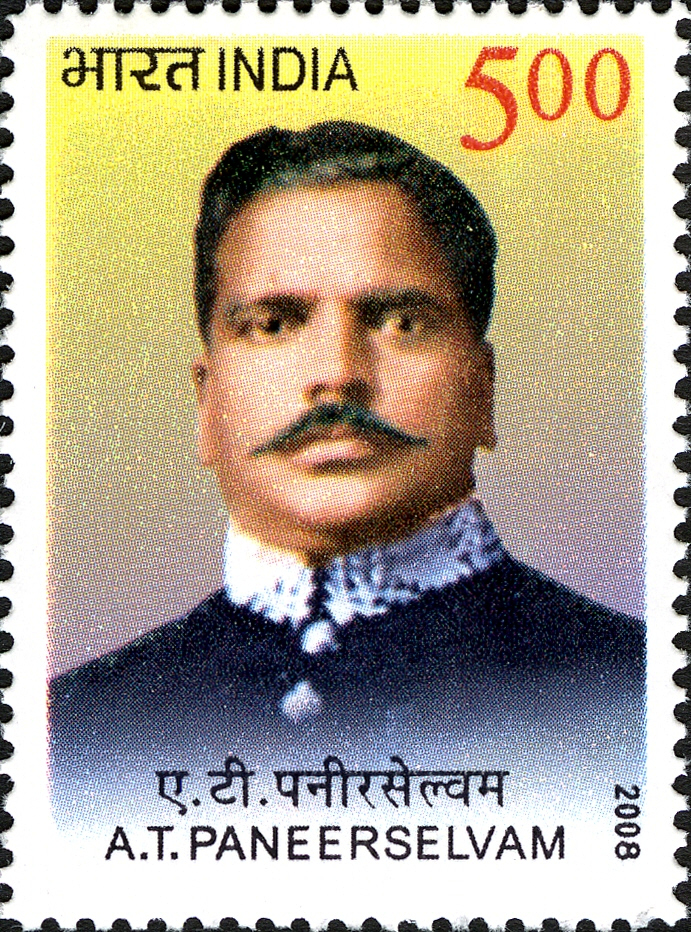
- A.T Paneerselvam Udayar

Minister of Home of Madras Presidency
- In office 1934–?
- Prime Minister: Raja of Bobbili
- Governor: John Erskine, Lord Erskine
- In office 1 April 1937 – 14 July 1937
- Prime Minister: Kurma Venkata Reddy Naidu
- Governor: John Erskine, Lord Erskine

Minister of Finance of Madras Presidency
- In office 1 April 1937 – 14 July 1937
- Prime Minister: Kurma Venkata Reddy Naidu
- Governor: John Erskine, Lord Erskine

Personal details
- Born: 1 June 1888 Selvapuram Presidency, British India (now Tamil Nadu, India)
- Died: 1 March 1940 (aged 51) Gulf of Oman
- Party: Justice Party
- Spouse: Pappammal
- Profession: Politician

Rao Bahadur Sir Annasamy Thamaraiselvam Pannirselvam (1 June 1888 – 1 March 1940) was an Indian attorney, landlord, politician and leader of the Justice Party.

== Early life ==
Pannirselvam was born on 1 June 1888 into a Udayar community family from Selvapuram in nannilam taluk in present-day Tiruvarur district, Tamil Nadu, India).

== Political career ==
Pannirselvam was the leader of the Tanjore Municipal Corporation during 1918–20 and a member of the Tanjore District board during 1924–30. He was an alumnus of Cambridge University and the first Indian Christian to be appointed as adviser to the Lord Zetland, Secretary of State for India. He attended the 1930 Round Table Conference on India as a nominee of the Viceroy to represent Indian Christians.

In 1937, Pannirselvam succeeded Mohammad Usman as the Minister for Home of the Madras Presidency, in the Raja of Bobbili cabinet. In 1936 he became the member for Home in the Executive Council of the Governor of Madras – Lord Erskine. He also served as the Minister for Home and Finance, in the short lived interim provincial government of Kurma Venkata Reddy Naidu during 1 April – 14 July 1937. After the defeat of the Justice party in the 1937 Assembly elections, Pannirselvam became the leader of the Justice party. He was one of the few Justice leaders to win in the 1937 elections, defeating George Joseph of the Indian National Congress from the Tanjore Constituency. The party under his leadership supported the Anti-Hindi agitations of 1937-40. He remained the leader of the party till 1938, when Periyar E. V. Ramasamy took over the leadership of the party in December 1938.

Pannirselvam was knighted in the 1938 New Year Honours list.

== Death ==
On 1 March 1940, Pannirselvam was traveling to London to join the Secretary of State's Indian Council, when the Imperial Airways flight he was flying in, Handley Page H.P.42 Hannibal, disappeared in the Gulf of Oman, killing everyone aboard.

== Legacy ==
In 1997, the Tamil Nadu Government named the newly created Tiruvarur district as "Pannirselvam Tiruvarur" district in his honour. (However, it reverted to its old name in 1997, when all names of persons were dropped from the names of districts and transport corporations.) On 31 December 2008, the Government of India issued a stamp (valued at Rs. 5) in his honour.
