= Agrarian distress =

Socioeconomic challenges in agricultural communities

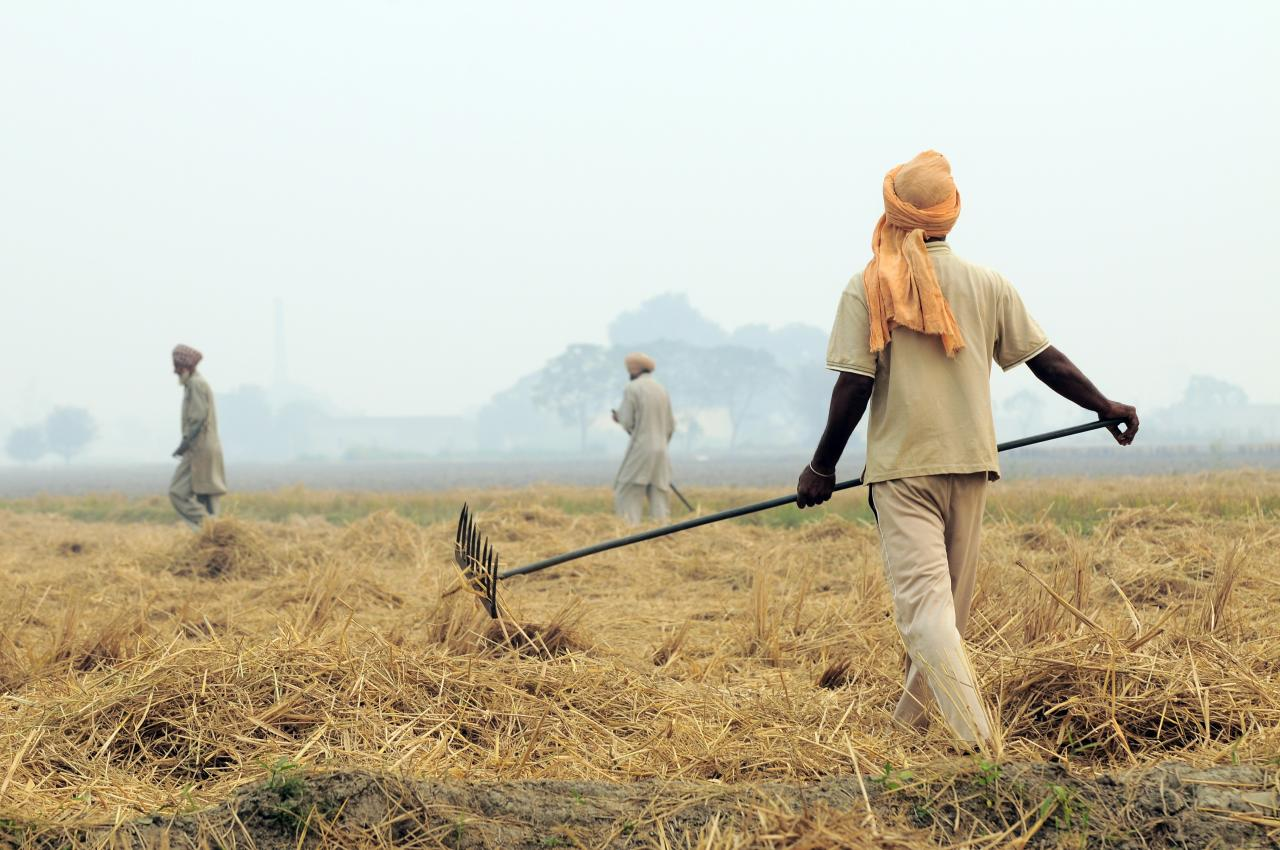
Farmers in India

Agrarian distress refers to the economic, political, and social challenges faced by farmers and rural communities due to factors such as low crop yields, fluctuating prices of agricultural produce, high input costs, indebtedness, and lack of access to credit, markets, and infrastructure.

The term "agrarian distress" gained prominence in India in the 1990s when a wave of farmer suicides occurred in the country. The reason for the suicides were due to various causes such as inadequate credit, poor market conditions, and insufficient technology that led to indebtedness.

In the 2020–2021 Indian farmers' protest, the issue of agrarian distress gained renewed attention due to the protests by farmers in India against agricultural bills that they claimed would hurt their livelihoods. The protests highlighted the long-standing issues faced by farmers in India, such as low income, lack of market access, and dependence on middlemen.

Neoliberal economic policies have contributed to the ongoing agrarian distress in India. The situation is linked to wider concerns about the corporatisation of agriculture, market concentration and the changing relationship between farmers, states and global agribusiness.

Agrarian distress is not limited to India but is a global phenomenon. In many countries, small-scale farmers face challenges such as lack of access to resources, low yields, and volatile markets.

== See also ==
- Farmers' suicides in India
- Family farm
