= C. Abdul Hakim =

Nawab C. Abdul Hakim
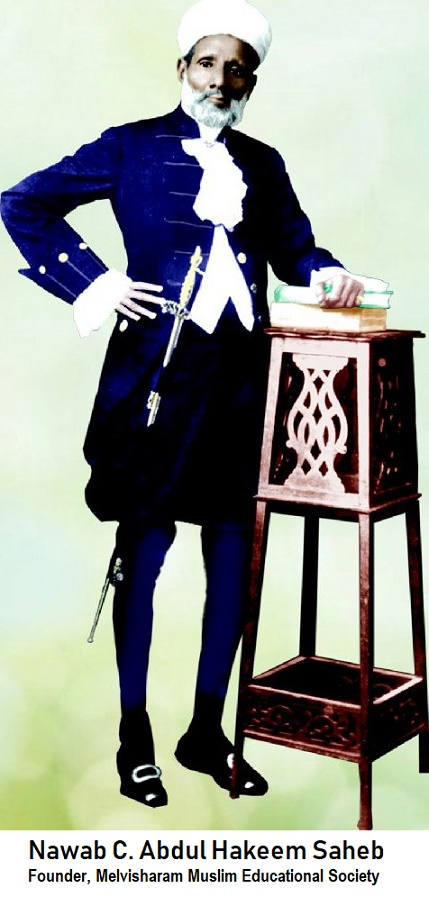
- Born: 1863; North Arcot, India
- Died: 1938 (aged 74–75)

Nawab C. Abdul Hakeem Saheb (1863–1938) was a Tamil Muslim trader, philanthropist, and politician from the Madras Presidency, British India. He was a native of Melvisharam in the North Arcot district and one of the respected traders of his time. He set up a tannery in 1907 and emerged as a prosperous businessman, serving as President of the Southern Indian Chamber of Commerce. He founded the Melvisharam Muslim Educational Society in 1918 with the aim of providing education to people regardless of caste, creed, or community. He served as Sheriff of Madras in 1930 and was elected to the Madras Legislative Assembly in 1937.

== Early life ==
C. Abdul Hakeem was born in North Arcot district of India in 1863. At the age of 21, he moved to the city of Madras in 1884 to join his father Siddique Hussain Sahib. Having learned the ropes of business, he started a small trade in hides and skins in 1907 and grew it into a substantial commercial enterprise, becoming a leading merchant and a major donor to charitable causes. His son, Late C. Siddique, named after his grandfather, continued his philanthropic work after his death in 1938.

== Politics ==
Abdul Hakeem founded the Madras Provincial Muslim League in 1908. He later founded and served as President of the Muslim Progressive Party. He was appointed Sheriff of Madras in 1930 and was elected to the Madras Legislative Assembly in 1937 from North Madras.

== Melvisharam Muslim Educational Society ==
C. Abdul Hakeem founded the Melvisharam Muslim Educational Society (MMES) in 1918. The Society began with a single primary school and has gradually grown over the following decades. At present, it manages 11 institutions from nursery level to a First Grade College with five postgraduate departments and three research departments. These include M.M.E.S. Arts and Science College for women and C. Abdul Hakeem College of Engineering and Technology, an ISO certified centre of learning.

The college was instituted in 1965 with just a Pre-University Course in local orphanage buildings. Subsequently, M.M.E.S. acquired a site of more than 67 acres on the eastern outskirts of Melvisharam, on the Chennai-Bangalore Trunk road, and constructed buildings to house the college and hostel. The college is affiliated to Thiruvalluvar University, Vellore, and has been re-accredited by the NAAC with 'A' Grade. At present, the college offers instruction in 31 courses at undergraduate level and 6 courses at postgraduate level, apart from facilities for research leading to the award of Ph.D.

MMES manages and maintains the following institutions:

- C. Abdul Hakeem College of Engineering and Technology
- C. Abdul Hakeem College of Arts and Science (Autonomous) (for Men) (Re-Accredited by NAAC with B++ Grade)
- M.M.E.S. Women's Arts and Science College
- Islamiah Boys Higher Secondary School
- Islamiah Girls Higher Secondary School
- Islamiah Primary School for Boys
- Islamiah Primary School for Girls
- Hakeem Matriculation School
- F.M. Primary School
- R.A. Primary School

== Siddique Sarai Mosque ==
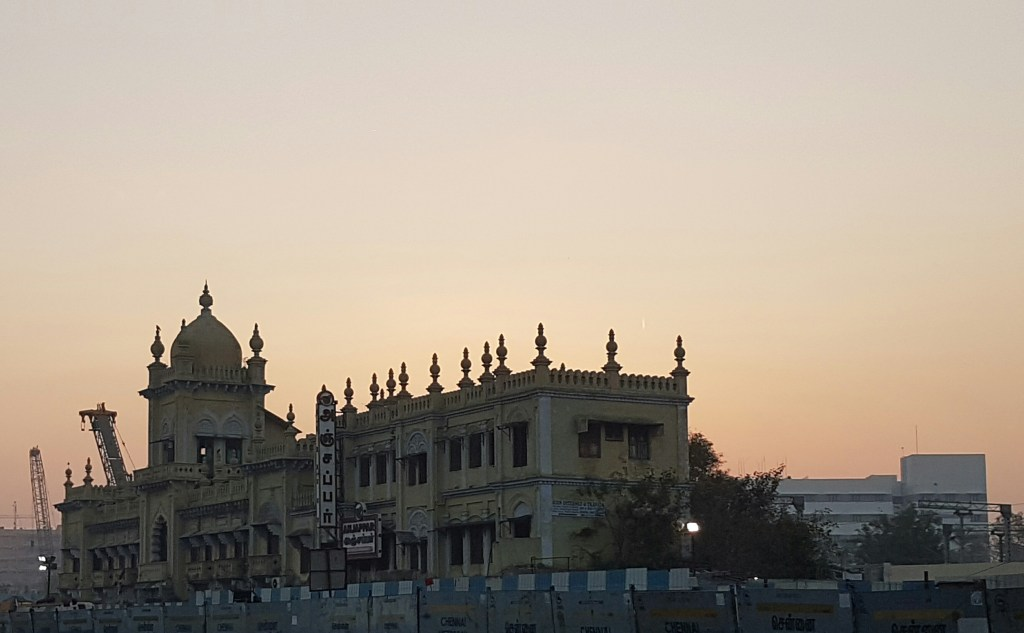
Siddique Sarai Mosque 2

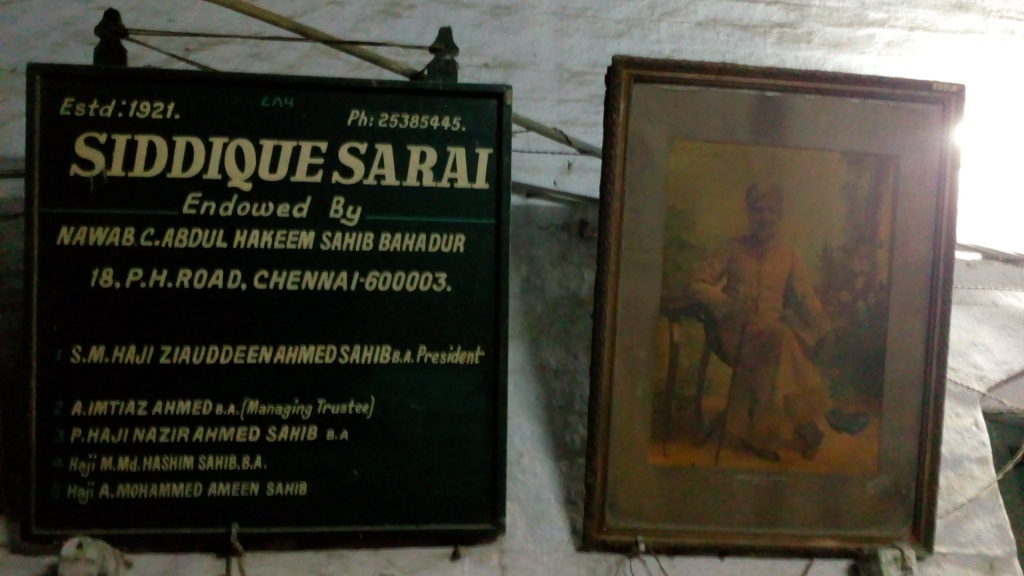
Siddique Sarai Mosque 1

Siddique Sarai is a choultry and mosque built for Muslim travellers in the Park Town area of Chennai, the capital of the South Indian state of Tamil Nadu, constructed by C. Abdul Hakeem in honour of his father Siddique Hussain Sahib. When his ailing father arrived at Madras Central railway station from Bombay and found no nearby facilities for Muslim travellers, he urged his son to build one. Abdul Hakeem purchased land opposite the Ripon Building at an auction for Rs. 50,000 and laid the foundation stone in 1919. The South Indian Railway raised objections to the construction, claiming the building was too close to its tracks. The consequent case went up to the Privy Council, which eventually ruled in favour of the construction. The building was completed and inaugurated in 1921. The Sarai is now vested in the Jamaath of the Periamet mosque.

Among Abdul Hakeem's other contributions are the Muslim High School in Triplicane, Chennai, of which he was one of the founders. In Melvisharam, a higher secondary school and an engineering college bear his name.
