= Chodagam Ammanna Raja =

Indian politician

C. Ammanna Raja

Rajya Sabha, Parliament of India
- Constituency: Attili and Eluru Andhra Pradesh

Personal details
- Born: 6 June 1909 Bandar, Madras Presidency, British India (present-day Andhra Pradesh)
- Died: 22 February 1999 (aged 89) Hyderabad, Andhra Pradesh
- Spouse: Chodagam Janardhana Rao
- Children: 1 son Chodagam Kishore and 1 daughter Urmila
- Education: Queen Mary's College

C. Ammanna Raja or Chodagam Ammanna Raja BA (6 June 1909 – 22 February 1999) was an Indian freedom movement activist and Rajya Sabha member from Andhra Pradesh.

She was born to Gandham Veerayya Naidu and Nagaratnamma in Bandar on 6 June 1909. She was one of eleven children. She was educated in Rajahmundry and completed graduation (B.A.) and L.T. in Madras in 1932. After the retirement of her father, she worked as teacher in Secunderabad and Bapatla for a while.

She was elected in the Madras Legislative Assembly in 1937 from Eluru constituency as a member of Indian National Congress with the support of Sarojini Naidu and Durgabai Deshmukh. With the beginning of Second World War in September 1939, all the members of Congress party had resigned from the Assembly.

She married Shri Chodagam Janardhana Rao on 27 August 1940. They had a daughter Urmila and son Kishore. Chodagam Janardhana Rao was a Chief civil engineer in the Bakra Nangal Dam Project in Punjab, India.

Chodagam Ammanna Raja participated in Satyagraha movement in 1940 with Mahatma Gandhi.

She was again elected as a Member of Madras Legislative Assembly from Eluru constituency in 1946. She was elected as Deputy Speaker of Madras Legislative Assembly between 1946 and 1952. She has fought in associated with the Dr. Muthulakshmi Reddy for the passing of Bill abolishing the Devadasi system in 1947.

She was elected to the Andhra Pradesh Legislative Assembly in 1955 from Attili, West Godavari district.

She was a Member of Parliament Rajya Sabha from Congress party from 3 April 1962 to 2 April 1968. She resigned from the politics in 1968 and worked untiringly for the welfare of women. She helped many people devastated during the 1977 Andhra Pradesh cyclone.

She educated several children, who otherwise would have been forced to work from a young age. These children now have excellent career prospects due to their education. One of them is serving in the Indian Army as an officer today.

She died on 22 February 1999 with her loving family by her side in Secunderabad, India.

She is survived by her son Kishore, Daughter-in-law Nalini, Grand Children Janardhan and Jyothsna. She is also survived by her daughter Doctor Urmila, Son-in-law Doctor Raman Rao, Grand Children Doctor Janardhan and Jyoti.
