= Yakub Hasan Sait =

Indian businessman, freedom-fighter and politician

Maulana Yakub Hasan Sait
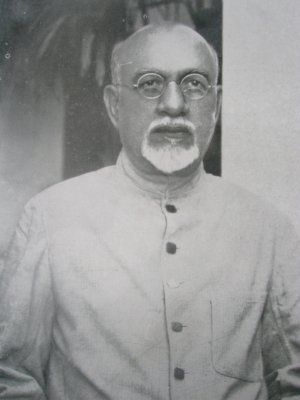

Minister of Public Works (Madras Presidency)
- In office 14 July 1937 – 9 October 1939
- Premier: C. Rajagopalachari
- Governor: John Erskine, Lord Erskine

Personal details
- Born: 1875 Nagpur, Central Provinces and Berar, British India
- Died: 1940 (aged 64–65) Madras, Madras Presidency, British India
- Party: All India Muslim League, Madras Provincial Muslim League, Indian National Congress
- Education: Aligarh University
- Occupation: Businessman, politician
- Profession: Businessman

Maulana Yakub Hasan Sait or simply Yakub Hasan Sait (1875–1940) was an Indian businessman, freedom-fighter and politician who served as the Minister for Public Works in the Madras presidency from 1937 to 1939.

Yakub Hasan Sait was born in Nagpur and educated in Aligarh University. At a very young age, he moved to Bangalore for business purposes and settled in Madras in the year 1901. He served as a member of the Madras Corporation and as a member of the Madras Legislative Council. From 1937 to 1939, he served as the Minister of Public Works in the Rajaji government.

Yakub Hasan Sait was a member of the Muslim League and later, the Indian National Congress. He was the only Muslim minister in Rajaji's 1937 cabinet.

== Early life ==
Yakub Hasan Sait was born in Nagpur, Central Provinces and Berar in 1875. He had his schooling and early education in Nagpur and he had his higher education from Aligarh University. Soon after completion of his degree in 1893, Sait moved to Bangalore and started his career as a businessman.

Sait moved to Madras in 1901 and gradually settled in the city. For a particular period of time, he worked as an international business agent under Nawab C. Abdul Hakim. Due to his immense knowledge of the Quran and other Muslim religious scriptures, Sait was often called "Maulana".

== Early politics and formation of the All-India Muslim League ==
Soon after his arrival in Madras, Sait entered public life and was elected member of the Madras Corporation. Sait was one of founders of the All India Muslim League. He was an active party worker and visited England as a delegate of the League. He was also the only Muslim politician from the Madras Presidency involved in the drafting of the Lucknow Pact.

== In the Indian Independence Movement ==
In 1916, Sait was elected to the Madras Legislative Council by the South Indian Chamber of Commerce. He joined the Indian National Congress and participated in the Khilafat agitations in 1919 and was imprisoned for six months. He was arrested and imprisoned once again in 1921 for his participation in the Non-Cooperation Movement. On his return from jail in 1923, he resigned from the Congress and founded the Madras Province Muslim League. This move was prompted by Sait's preference for Dominion Status when the Congress declaration of independence as its primary goal. As a result, no Muslim leader from the Presidency participated in the Civil Disobedience Movement. Sait stood for the elections and was elected to the Assembly. In 1927, Sait allied with the United Nationalist party of N. G. Ranga.

A little before the 1937 elections, Sait, left the Madras Provincial Muslim League and joined the Indian National Congress. Soon, he became one of the top leaders of the provincial Congress. He condemned Mohammad Iqbal's two-nation theory and supported a united India. However, he still supported most of the other policies of the Muslim League.

== In Rajaji's cabinet ==
Sait won the 1937 elections to the Madras assembly. He was made a minister in the Madras cabinet and was given in charge of the Public Works Department. Sait resigned along with other ministers when Britain declared war on Germany.

== Death ==
In March 1940, a few months after resigning as Minister, Sait suffered chest pains and had to be hospitalized. He died soon afterwards.

== Controversy ==
In the 1930s, most Tamil Muslim politicians were concentrated in the Madras Provincial Muslim League. These Muslim Leaguers were against the atheist policies of the Self-Respect Movement. At the same time, there was also not much support for the Indian National Congress amongst the Muslims in the Presidency.

During his campaigning for the Indian National Congress, Sait was accused of disrespecting Islam at a meeting in Coimbatore by not standing while verses from the Quran were read. Throughout the remainder of the campaign, he was shown black flags at rallies.

== See also ==
- The Saits

== Notes ==
Preceded by	Member of the Madras Legislative Council; 1916–1919; 1923–1939	Succeeded by {{{after}}}
Preceded by	President of the Madras Provincial Muslim League; 1927	Succeeded by
Preceded by	Minister of Public Works (Madras Presidency); 1937–1939	Succeeded by Governor rule
