= V. I. Munuswamy Pillai =

Rao Sahib Vellore Iyyasamy Munuswamy Pillai
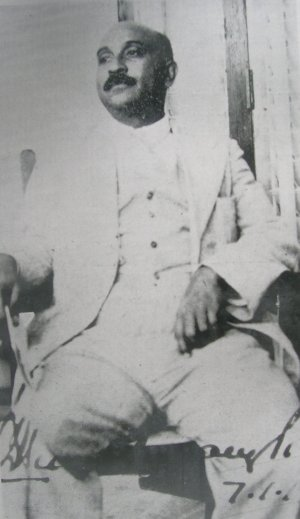
- Portrait from the Haripura Congress Souvenir, 1938

Member of Constituent Assembly of India
- In office 9 December 1946 – 24 January 1950

Minister of Agriculture and Rural Development (Madras Presidency)
- In office 14 July 1937 – 9 October 1939
- Premier: C. Rajagopalachari
- Governor: John Erskine, Lord Erskine

Personal details
- Born: 1889 Ootacamund, Madras Presidency
- Died: 14 December 1953 (aged 63–64) Madras
- Party: Indian National Congress
- Profession: businessman

Rao Sahib Vellore Iyyasamy Munuswamy Pillai (23 February 1889 – 14 December 1953) also spelled as Munisami Pillai, was an Indian businessman, politician, Scheduled Caste activist and activist of the Indian independence movement who served as the Minister for Agriculture and Rural Development in the government of C. Rajagopalachari from 1937 to 1939.

== Early life ==
Munuswamy Pillai was born in a poor(Inter caste married) family in Ootacamund, Nilgiris district in 1889. Due to his adverse financial circumstances, Munuswamy Pillai could afford little formal education and was forced to take up a job as a clerk at the age of twenty. After a successful stint as a clerk, Munuswamy Pillai set up his own business in 1925.

== Public life ==
Munuswamy Pillai was nominated to the Madras Legislative Council in 1926 representing the depressed classes. Under the presidency of V. I. Munusamy Pillai 'The All India DC Congress' (2nd Conference) was held at Nagpur in May 1932. He supported the policies of the Indian National Congress and served as Minister of Agriculture and Rural Development in Rajaji's cabinet from 1937 to 1939.

== Later life ==
Munuswamy Pillai retired from public life following the resignation of the Congress ministry in 1939. He returned to politics and was later elected to the Indian Constituent Assembly from Madras in 1946. In the Constituent Assembly of India on 22 July 1947 for the adoption of the National Flag he said, "It is not to be the Flag of the rich or the wealthy but it is to be the Flag of the depressed, oppressed and submerged classes all over our country." He contested and lost the 1952 parliamentary elections from Tindivanam as an Indian National Congress candidate. He died on 14 December 1953 at the 63. A special resolution was passed by the Madras Legislative Assembly condoling his death.
