= M. C. Rajah =

Indian politician, educationist and social and political activist

- Born: 17 June 1883; St. Thomas Mount, Madras, India
- Died: 23 August 1943 (aged 60); St. Thomas Mount, Madras, India
- Other name: Perunthalaivar
- Education: Madras Christian College
- Occupations: Scheduled Castes Rights Activist, Freedom Fighter, Politician

Mylai Chinna Thambi Pillai Rajah (17 June 1883 – 23 August 1943) was a Tamil politician, educationist, social and political activist from the Indian union state of Tamil Nadu.

Rajah was born to a Tamil family of Madras. He entered politics after graduation and was a leader in the Justice Party. However, he quit the party in 1923 over the party's treatment of the then Depressed Classes. He was the first leader who organized the Scheduled Classes at the national level in India, and the most prominent Scheduled Classes leader of pre-independent India. In his heyday, Rajah was considered to be a person equal in stature to B. R. Ambedkar. He was the pioneer of mid-day meal scheme in India.

== Early life ==
Rajah was born to Mylai Chinna Thambi Pillai in 1883 at St. Thomas Mount, Madras. Chinna Thambi Pillai was the manager of Lawrence Asylum. Rajah had his schooling at the Wesley Mission High School, Royapettah and Wesley College. He graduated from Madras Christian College and worked as a school teacher and later a professor.

== Politics ==
Rajah joined politics at an early age and was elected president of the Chingleput district board. In 1916, he became the Secretary of the Adi-Dravida Mahajana Sabha. He was one of the founder-members of the South Indian Liberal Federation. Rajah was elected to the Madras Legislative Council as a Justice Party candidate during the first general elections held in November 1920. He was elected Deputy Leader of the Justice Party in the house. Rajah was the first member of the scheduled caste community to be elected to the Madras Legislative Council. In 1922, Rajah passed a resolution demanding that the terms Paraiya and Panchama be dropped from official usage and instead be substituted with Adi-Dravida and Adi-Andhra.

In 1921, the Justice Party government of the Raja of Panagal introduced reservations for non-Brahmins in government jobs. However, this act did not allocate quotas for scheduled castes as demanded by Rajah. Disenchanted, Rajah led a delegation of scheduled castes to protest the act and press their demand for separate quota. But the Justice Party did not respond. Instead, when riots broke out in Puliyanthope the same year, top-ranking Justice Party leaders regarded the Government's policy of appeasement of paraiyars responsible for the strike. Outraged at this, Rajah quit the party in 1923. He remained a member of the Madras Legislative Council till 1926. In 1925, he created and became the president of the All India Depressed Classes Association at Nagpur. From 1927 till 1937, he was a member of the Imperial Legislative Assembly. During April–July 1937 he was the Madras Presidency's Minister for Development in the short lived interim provisional cabinet of Kurma Venkata Reddy Naidu.

In 1917, he was nominated by Lord Pentland to the Elementary Education Committee. In 1919, he served on the select committee of the Elementary Education Bill. He was also a member of the Secondary Education Reorganization Committee. In 1924, Lord Willingdon nominated him to the Senate of Madras University.

== Change of views ==
Originally Rajah stood for the Separate Electorates and Ambedkar for the Joint Electorates with Adult Suffrage and Reservation of seats. But Ambedkar changed his state of mind to the separate electorate, putting forth separate electorates as a united demand of the then Depressed Classes due to the pressure from Rajah and Madras Presidency Organisations in 1931. However, Rajah changed his mind to Joint Electorates with reserved seats on population basis due to lower representation of the Minority Pact in 1932. So he concluded a pact with the All India President of the Hindu Mahasabha B. S. Moonje. This was known as the Rajah–Moonje pact. According to this pact, Moonje offered reserved seats to the Scheduled Castes in return for Rajah's support. The Rajah-Moonje Pact was a precursor for the Poona Pact.

== Death ==
Rajah died on Monday, 23 August 1943 at his house at St. Thomas Mount, today named as "Rajah Street". To honour his works, Bayya Suryanarayana Murthy founded the M. C. Rajah Memorial Hostel for the college students of the Scheduled Classes in 1944 at Saidapet in Madras.

== Publications ==
- Rajah, M. C. (1939). Independence Without, Freedom Within: Speech of Rao Bahadur M.C. Rajah, M.L.A., at the Madras Legislative Assembly on the 26th October 1939 on the Congress Resolution on India and the War.
- Rajah, M. C.; J. Shivashunmugham Pillai (1930). The Life, Select Writings and Speeches of Rao Bahadur M. C. Rajah. Indian Publishing House.
- Jain Meeanakshi, Rajah-Moonje Pact: Documents On A Forgotten Chapter Of Indian History (with Devendra Svarupa, Low Price Publishers, 2007), ISBN 8184540787.

== See also ==
- Rettamalai Srinivasan
- B R Ambedkar

== Bibliography ==
- Basu, Swaraj (2012). Unforgettable Dalit Voice: Life, Writings & Speeches of M C Rajah. New Delhi: Manohar Publishers. p. 318. ISBN 978-81-7304-966-8.
