= J. Shivashanmugam Pillai =

Indian politician (1901–1975)

J. Shivashanmugam
- Born: Jagannathan Shivashanmugam; 24 February 1901; Madras, Madras Presidency, British India (now Chennai, Tamil Nadu, India)
- Died: 17 February 1975 (aged 73)
- Education: Loyola College, Chennai
- Occupation: politician
- Spouse: Chandra

Jagannathan Shivashanmugam Pillai (24 February 1901 – 17 February 1975) was an Indian politician of the Indian National Congress. In 1938, he became the first Scheduled Caste Mayor of Madras. He also served as the first speaker of the Madras Legislative Assembly after India's independence.

== Early life ==
Shivashanmugam was born Madras (now Chennai, the capital of Tamil Nadu) theon 24 February 1901. His father Jagannathan was a steward. Shivashanmugam had his schooling in Madras and graduated from Loyola College. He completed his master's in private from the University of Madras.

== First Speaker in independent India ==
The first elections to state assemblies were conducted in 1951. Since independence, the franchise had been enlarged to include all Indian citizens. Shivashanmugam was elected to the assembly and was successfully nominated as the first Speaker. Shivashanmugam served as the Speaker of the assembly from 1951 to 1955.

== Later life ==
From 1955 to 1961, Shivashanmugam served as a member of the Union Public Service Commission. In 1962, he was nominated to the Rajya Sabha, the upper house of the Indian Parliament and served as member from 1962 to 1968.

== Family ==
Shivashanmugam married Chandra in 1937 and has three sons and one daughter.

== Death ==
Shivashanmugam died on 17 February 1975 at the age of 73.

== Works ==
- History of the Adi Dravidas.
- Rajah, M. C.; J. Shivashunmugham (1930). The Life, Select Writings and Speeches of Rao Bahadur M. C. Rajah. Indian Publishing House.
- Legislative Protection of Cultivating Tenant Labourers.

== Notes ==
Preceded by K. Sriramulu Naidu	Mayor of Madras; 1937-1938	Succeeded by K. Venkataswamy Naidu
