= R. M. Palat =

Indian politician

Ramunni Menon Palat was an Indian lawyer, landholder and politician from Kerala, belonging to the Justice Party. He had a BCL degree from the University of Oxford. He was briefly the Minister for Public Health for the presidency, in Kurma Venkata Reddy Naidu's interim provisional cabinet during 1 April-14 July 1937. He was a Jenmi (landlord) and represented the Westcoast (Malabar) Landholder's Constituency in the Madras Legislature during 1930–36. He was one of the two members in the Madras Legislative Assembly to oppose the Malabar Temple Entry Act which granted untouchables the right of entry into temples in the Malabar District. He later became a member of the Hindu Mahasabha. He was the son of the Indian National Congress leader C. Sankaran Nair and brother-in-law of the diplomat K. P. S. Menon. His great-granddaughter is the Hindi film actress Divya Palat.
