= T. S. S. Rajan =

Indian politician (1880–1953)

Dr. Tiruvengimalai Sesha Sundara Rajan
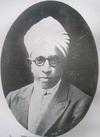
- Portrait from the Haripura Congress Souvenir, 1938

Minister of Food and Public Health (Madras Presidency, later Madras state)
- In office 1946–1951
- Premier: Tanguturi Prakasam, O. P. Ramaswamy Reddiyar

Minister of Public Health and Religious Endowments (Madras Presidency)
- In office 14 July 1937 – 9 October 1939
- Premier: C. Rajagopalachari
- Governor: John Erskine, Lord Erskine

Member of the Imperial Legislative Council
- In office 1934–1936
- Governor General: Freeman Freeman-Thomas, 1st Marquess of Willingdon

Personal details
- Born: 1880 Srirangam, Madras Presidency
- Died: 1953 (aged 72–73) Madras
- Party: Indian National Congress
- Education: St. Joseph's College, Trichinopoly, Royapuram Medical School, Madras
- Occupation: Doctor, politician

Tiruvengimalai Sesha Sundara Rajan (1880–1953) was an Indian medical doctor, politician and freedom-fighter who served the Minister of Public Health and Religious Endowments in the Madras Presidency from 1937 to 1939.

Rajan was born in Srirangam in Trichinopoly district and studied medicine at Royapuram Medical School, Madras and England. He practised as a doctor in Burma and England and obtained his M.R.C.S. degree in 1911. In 1923, he set up his own clinic.

Rajan entered the Indian independence movement in 1919 and joined the Indian National Congress. He participated in the agitations against the Rowlatt Act and in the Vedaranyam Salt Satyagraha. He served as the President of the Tamil Nadu Congress Committee and as the Member of the Imperial Legislative Council of India from 1934 to 1936. From 1937 to 1939, he served as the Minister of Public Health in the Madras provincial government.

== Early life ==
Sundararajan was born in Nagapattinam 1880. He had his early education from St. Joseph's College, Trichinopoly and graduated in medicine from Royapuram Medical School, Madras. Following his graduation, Rajan moved to Burma and set up practice in Rangoon.

In 1907, Rajan sailed to England to pursue his higher studies. He obtained his M.R.C.S. degree in 1911 and worked in the Middlesex Hospital. He was an acclaimed surgeon and physician.

Rajan returned to Burma soon after and practised till 1914, before returning to India. In 1923, he set up his own clinic called "Rajan Clinic".

== In the Indian independence movement ==
During his days in England, Rajan was a close associate of V. D. Savarkar and V. V. S. Aiyar and was a member of the India House. However, in May 1910, Rajan had a quarrel with Aiyar. On his return to India in 1914, he met Rajagopalachari and joined the Indian National Congress. He participated in the agitations against the Rowlatt Act and was jailed for a year. He also coordinated and organised the activities of the Khilafat Committee from 1920 to 1922 along with T. V. Swaminatha Sastri.

Rajan served in a number of party posts in the Indian National Congress over the years. He served as the General Secretary of the Congress and as the President, and later, Secretary of the Tamil Nadu Congress Committee. He also served as the President of the Civil, Social and Welfare League of Trichinopoly.

Rajan participated in the Vedaranyam Salt Satyagraha organised by Rajaji and suffered imprisonment. He was released in 1931 after having been in prison for eighteen months. From 1932 to 1935, Rajan served as the President of the Tamil Nadu branch of the Harijan Sevak Sangh.

In 1934, Rajan was elected to the Imperial Legislative Council of India and served till 1936, when he resigned owing to differences of opinion. Rajan participated in the 1937 Madras provincial elections and was elected to the Madras Legislative Council. He took the portfolios of public health and religious endowments in the Rajaji cabinet.

== Later years and death ==
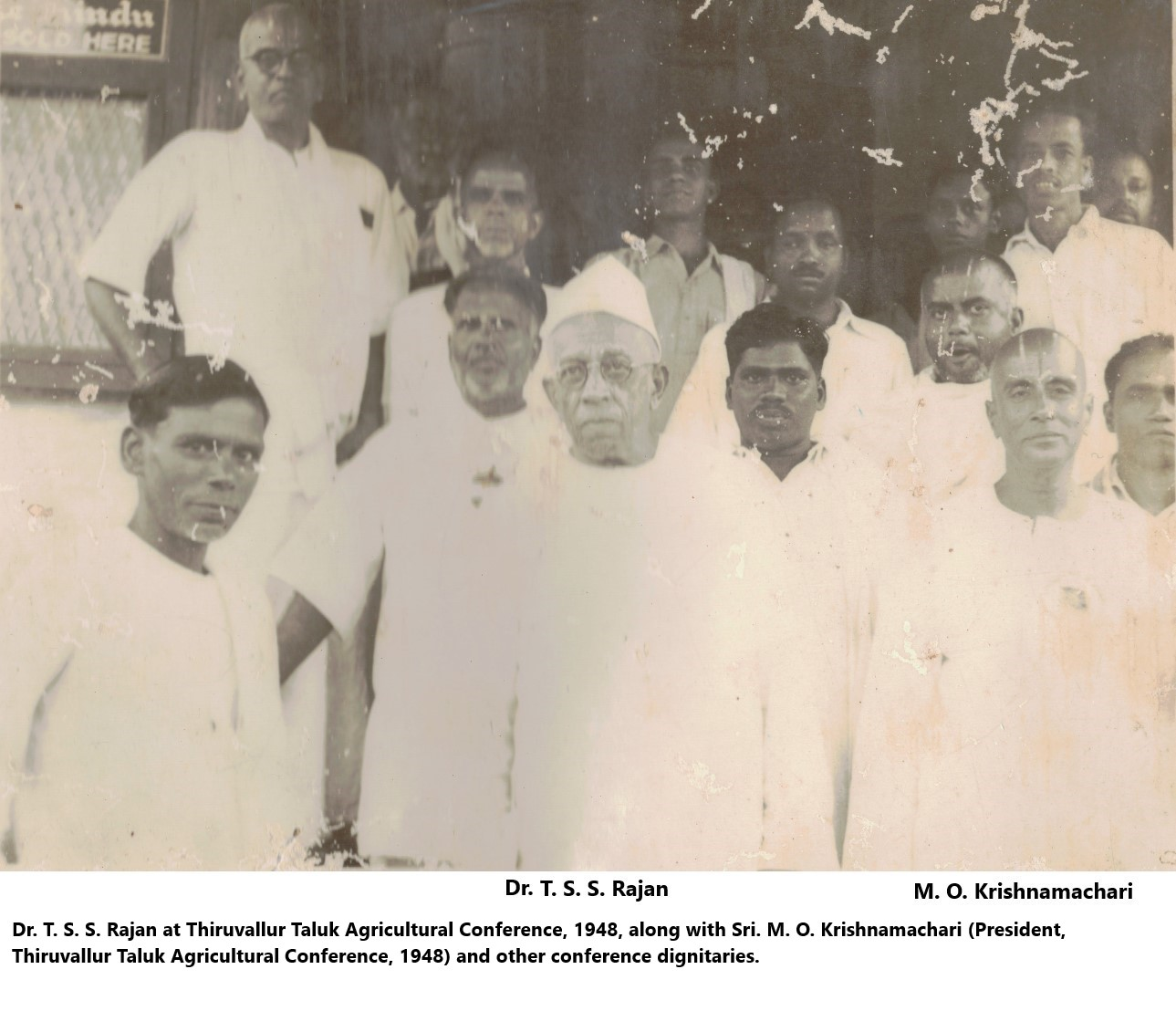
Dr. T. S. S. Rajan at Thiruvallur Taluk Agricultural Conference, 1948, along with Sri. M. O. Krishnamachari (President, Thiruvallur Taluk Agricultural Conference, 1948) and other conference dignitaries.

In 1946, when the Congress was elected to power once again in Madras Presidency and Tanguturi Prakasam became Premier, Rajan was appointed Minister of Food and Public Health.

In 1948, Dr. T. S. S. Rajan attended the Thiruvallur Taluk Agricultural Conference and unveiled the portrait of Sri. C. Rajagopalachari (Rajaji). He served as minister till 1951.

In 1953, Rajan had an operation for appendicitis. Shortly after the operation, he died on 14 December 1953 at the age of 73.

== Works ==
- T. S. S. Rajan (1946). Va. Ve. Cu. Iyer (in Tamil). Madras.
- T. S. S. Rajan (1947). Ninaivu Alaigal (Autobiography) (in Tamil). Madras.

== Notes ==
Preceded by	Secretary of the Indian National Congress	Succeeded by
Preceded by	President of the Tamil Nadu Congress Committee	Succeeded by
Preceded by	Secretary of the Tamil Nadu Congress Committee	Succeeded by
Preceded by 1937	Minister of Public Health and Religious Endowments; 1939	Succeeded by Governor Rule
Preceded by 1946	Minister of Food and Public Health; 1951	Succeeded by
