= Kurma Venkata Reddi Naidu =

Indian lawyer, diplomat, and politician (1875–1942)

Rao Bahadur Sir Kurma Venkatareddi Naidu KCSI
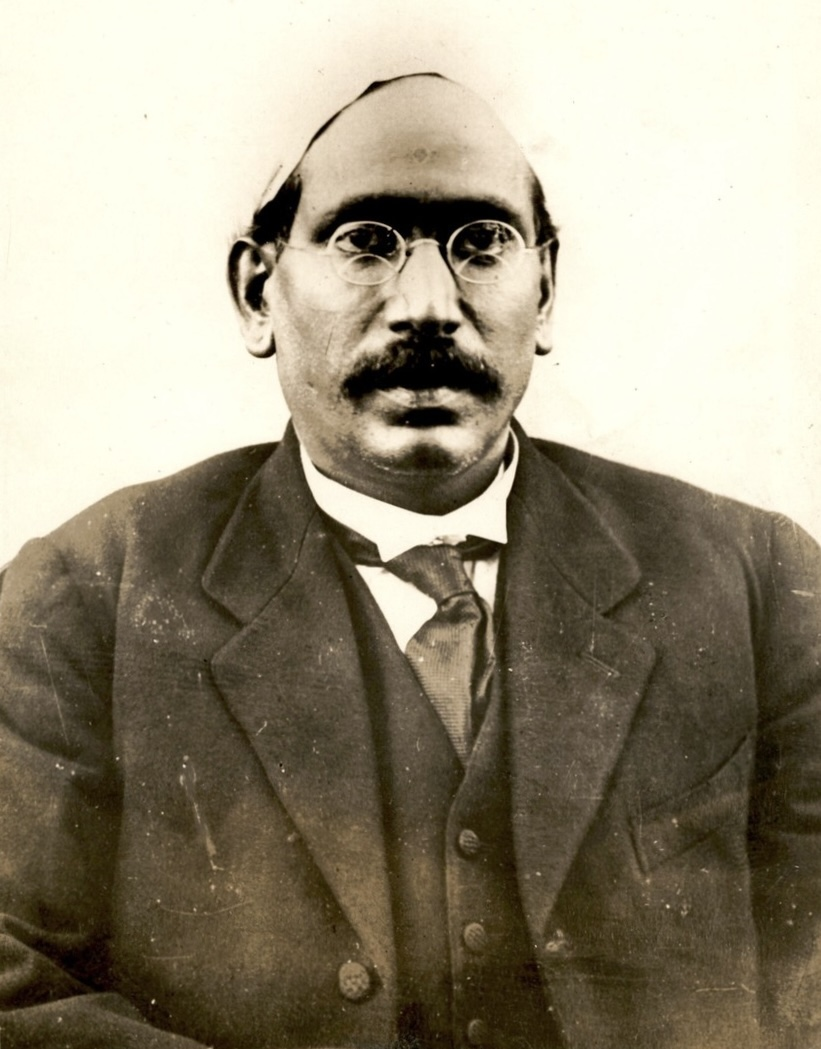
- Naidu in 1928

7th Premier of Madras Presidency
- In office 1 April 1937 – 14 July 1937
- Governor: John Erskine, Lord Erskine
- Preceded by: Raja of Bobbili (as First Minister)
- Succeeded by: Chakravarti Rajagopalachari

Governor of Madras Presidency (Acting)
- In office 18 June 1936 – 1 October 1936
- Premier: Raja of Bobbili, P. T. Rajan

Member of Viceroy's Executive Council
- In office 1934–1937
- Governors-General: Freeman Freeman-Thomas, 1st Marquess of Willingdon, Victor Hope, 2nd Marquess of Linlithgow

Agent to the Union of South Africa
- In office 1929–1932
- Monarch: George V of the United Kingdom
- Governors-General: E. F. L. Wood, 1st Earl of Halifax, Freeman Freeman-Thomas, 1st Marquess of Willingdon
- Preceded by: V. S. Srinivasa Sastri
- Succeeded by: Kunwar Maharaj Singh

Minister of Development
- In office 1920–1923
- Premier: A. Subbarayalu Reddiar, Raja of Panagal
- Governor: Freeman Freeman-Thomas, 1st Marquess of Willingdon
- Preceded by: None
- Succeeded by: T. N. Sivagnanam Pillai

Personal details
- Born: 15 May 1875 Rajahmundry, Godavari District, Madras Presidency, British Raj
- Died: 10 September 1942 (aged 67) Madras, Madras Presidency, British Raj
- Party: Justice Party
- Spouse: Lakshmi Kanthamma
- Children: KV Gopala Swamy Naidu, KV Raja Gopal Swamy Naidu, KV Madana Gopala Swamy Naidu, Kamala, Vimala
- Profession: Politician

Rao Bahadur Sir Kurma Venkatareddi Naidu KCSI (1875–1942), also known as K. V. Reddi Naidu, was an Indian politician, lawyer, diplomat, and academic. He served as the Premier of Madras Presidency and was one of only two Indians to hold the position of Governor of Madras Presidency, making him the only individual in history to have served as both Premier and Governor. As a prominent leader of the Justice Party, Naidu was known for his efforts to promote social equality, the abolition of untouchability, and social reforms. He was instrumental in the establishment of the first women's college in the Andhra region, located in Eluru.

Born into a prominent Kapu family from the Godavari district, Naidu pursued his education at Madras Christian College and Madras Law College. Before his legal career, he served as a professor of physics at the Government Arts College, Rajahmundry. He was called to the bar in 1900 and practiced law in Rajahmundry and Eluru. His political career began with his involvement in local and district boards between 1901 and 1919, after which he joined the Justice Party. Naidu played a key role in T. M. Nair's delegation to the United Kingdom in 1918. He later served in the cabinets of A. Subbarayalu Reddiar and the Raja of Panagal as Minister of Development and Minister of Industries from 1920 to 1923.

Naidu also held several diplomatic positions, including representing India at the League of Nations in Geneva in 1928 and serving as India's Agent to the Union of South Africa from 1929 to 1932. He was also a member of the Indian delegation at the Second Round Table Conference in Cape Town in 1932. After returning to India, Naidu served as a Law Member of the Council of State from 1933 to 1934 and as a member of the Governor's Executive Council of Madras from 1934 to 1937. Between June and October 1936, he acted as the Governor of Madras Presidency. In April 1937, Naidu was appointed Premier of Madras Presidency, a role he held until July 1937.

In addition to his political and diplomatic contributions, Naidu held academic leadership roles, including serving as the Governor and ex-officio Chancellor of Andhra University and later as the Vice-Chancellor of Annamalai University in 1940. He died on 10 September 1942; the Kurma Venkata Reddy Naidu Prize is awarded annually at Annamalai University in his honour.

== Early life ==
Kurma Venkatareddi Naidu was born on 15 May 1875 in Rajahmundry in Godavari district and belonged to a Telaga Kapu family. His father, Kurma Bapanna Naidu, won a name for himself as a Police Inspector. His mother, Venkata Ratnamma was reputed to be a pious and simple lady.

Naidu's ancestors were rich, and reportedly owned two villages, Gangavaram and Kurmapuram in the Ramachandrapuram mandal of Godavari district. One of his paternal ancestors, Sambhanna Naidu, served as a military officer on the side of the English against the Dutch in the late eighteenth century, and earned the title of Kumandan (Commandant) which became a family appellation.

== Education ==
He completed his B.A. degree from Madras Christian College in 1894 and later attended Madras Law College. Before being called to the bar in 1900, he was a professor of Physics at the Government Arts College, Rajahmundry. He started his practice as an advocate in Rajahmundry and then shifted to Eluru.

== Early political career ==
Naidu served on local and district boards in Rajahmundry and Eluru between 1901 and 1919. He was a member of the Justice Party right from its inception. He was a part of the Justice Party delegation to England along with Dr. T. M. Nair and Arcot Ramasamy Mudaliar in July 1918. In 1919, he led the non-Brahmin deputation to the Joint Parliamentary Committee on Constitutional Reforms. Naidu was an active partyman and when the Montagu–Chelmsford Reforms were passed in 1919, Naidu formulated a set of activities that the Justice Party should follow.

Social legislation has to be undertaken and inequitious laws that, for ages, maintained an invidious distinction between Brahmins and non-Brahmins, with regard to marriage, adoption and inheritance and the like, must be altered. Outside the sphere of politics, the work before us is equally onerous. Social reconstruction must be taken in hand at once. Social equality must be established. The strain of untouchability shall be removed. The dictates of priestcraft must be silenced. Paracheries must be purified. Agraharams must be humanized. The hold of humiliating customs and rituals must be unloosed. The portals of temples must be thrown broad open. The contents of sealed scriptures should be brought to light.

== Minister in Justice Party Cabinet ==
In December 1920, when the Justice Party was elected to power in Madras Presidency, Naidu won a seat in the Madras Legislative Council and served as the Minister of Development. He also served as the Minister of Industries in the government of the Raja of Panagal from 1921 to 1923, when he was dropped in favour of T. N. Sivagnanam Pillai. He remained neutral when a vote of no-confidence was passed against the government of the Raja of Panagal.

He was knighted in the 1923 Birthday Honours.

In 1924, when the Muddiman Committee came to India to assess the implementation and progress of dyarchy, K. V. Reddi Naidu explained its progress thus:

I was a Minister of Development without the forests. I was a Minister of Agriculture minus Irrigation. As a Minister of Agriculture I had nothing to do with the Madras Agriculturists Loan Act or the Madras Land Improvement Loans Act. The efficacy and efficiency of a Minister of Agriculture without having anything to do with irrigation, agricultural loans, land improvement loans and famine relief, may better be imagined than described. Then again, I was Minister of Industries without factories, boilers, electricity and water power, mines or labor, all of which are reserved subjects.

Naidu also lent his support to reduction of economic inequality in villages. A speech delivered by him in 1924 emphasised the dangers of colonial forms of property rights. In Naidu's view, "the English and Scotch land systems were based upon the Roman conception of Dominium. According to these systems, the landlord is the absolute owner of the soil. The tenant has no proprietary interest in it and has no rights whatsoever."

In 1928, Naidu was a member of the Indian delegation to the League of Nations, Geneva.

== Agent to South Africa ==
In January 1929, Naidu succeeded V. S. Srinivasa Sastri as British India's Agent to the Union of South Africa. In January 1930, he came under severe criticism from the South African Indian Congress (SAIC) for not having done enough to protect the interests of the Indians migrants. In February 1930, the first reading of the TALT (Amendment) Bill was passed. The South African Indian Congress was severely opposed to the Bill and Naidu spoke at a meeting of the SAIC in October 1930 expressing his outrage. He was a member of the Indian delegation which participated in the Second Round Table Conference with the representatives of the South African Government on 4 January 1932. Naidu's term came to an end on 3 August 1932 and he was succeeded by Kunwar Maharaj Singh.

== Acting Governor of Madras Presidency ==
On leaving South Africa, he took up various positions in the Indian Government. He became a member of the Council of State from 1933 to 1934, and a member of the Governor's Executive Council, Madras, 1934 -1937. In between, he was the acting Governor of Madras Presidency from June–October 1936.

== Prime Minister of Madras Presidency ==
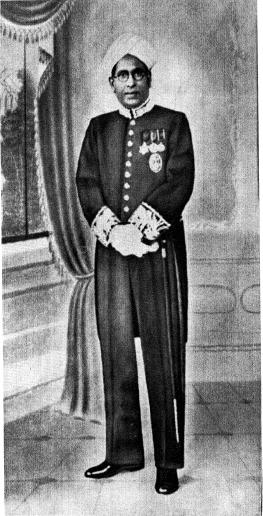
Naidu in 1940–1941

Naidu was the Prime Minister of Madras Presidency from 1 April 1937 to 14 July 1937. The 1937 assembly elections were held and the results declared in February 1937. Despite being the majority party in the assembly and the council, the Indian National Congress was hesitant to form a Government because of the veto powers given to the governor. The Governor of Madras, Lord Erskine, decided to form an interim provisional Government with non-members and opposition members of the Legislative Assembly. V. S. Srinivasa Sastri was first offered the Prime Ministership of the interim government but he refused to accept it.

Then Erskine formed an interim government with Kurma Venkata Reddi Naidu as prime minister on 1 April 1937. However the ministry was short lived as the Congress was persuaded to form the government. On 14 July, Naidu resigned and Rajaji became prime minister. Naidu remains the shortest-serving prime minister of the Presidency era and (factoring in the Presidency's successor states of Madras and Tamil Nadu), remained the shortest-serving ever until V. N. Janaki overtook his record in 1988 - almost five decades later.

Council of ministers in K. V. Reddi Naidu's interim provisional cabinet (1 April - 14 July 1937):

Minister	Portfolio
Kurma Venkata Reddi Naidu	Prime Minister, Public, Revenue and Legal
A. T. Panneerselvam	Home and Finance
M. A. Muthiah Chettiar	Local self-government
P. Kalifulla Sahib Bahadur	Public Works
M. C. Rajah	Development
R. M. Palat	Education and Public health

== Academia ==
Sir Kurma Venkatareddi Naidu (1875–1942) was an Indian politician, lawyer, diplomat, and academic who played an important role in the Madras Presidency during British rule. Born in Rajahmundry, he studied at Madras Christian College and later became a lawyer after working as a physics professor.

Naidu was a leading member of the Justice Party and worked to promote social equality and reforms, including efforts to reduce discrimination and untouchability. He served in several important government positions, including Minister of Development, Agent to South Africa, Acting Governor of Madras, and Premier of Madras Presidency in 1937.

In addition to his political career, Naidu contributed to higher education as Chancellor of Andhra University and Vice-Chancellor of Annamalai University. He died in 1942 and is remembered for his public service, leadership, and commitment to social reform.

Fun Facts:

- He was the only person to serve as both Governor and Premier of Madras Presidency.
- Before becoming a lawyer, he worked as a physics professor.
- He represented India at the League of Nations in Geneva in 1928.
- He helped promote social equality and supported opening temples to all people.
- A university prize, the Kurma Venkata Reddi Naidu Prize, is awarded

== Personal life ==
Naidu lived in Madras in a palatial mansion on Boag Road, T. Nagar. The house later came under the ownership of film star Sivaji Ganesan. As a tribute to Naidu's exalted status and the high offices he held, the then European-owned Madras Southern Mahratta Railway allotted him, under instructions from the Government of India, a special salon exuding luxury whenever he travelled. This privilege was extended to very few Indians and he was the only one in the Madras Presidency to receive it. He died on 10 September 1942.

Naidu's son, Kurma Venu Gopalaswamy was an advocate, playwright and administrator. Venu Gopalaswamy was the first professor of law at Andhra University and the first honorary professor of theatre arts and chairman of the Faculty of Arts. In April 1942, Venu Gopalaswamy was appointed the Registrar of Andhra University which he held till his retirement in February 1964. Nalla Reddi Naidu, son of one of Venkatareddi Naidu's cousins, served as the first Member of Parliament of Rajahmundry from 1952 to 1957.

Preceded by Raja of Bobbili	Prime Minister of Madras Presidency; 1 April 1937 – 14 July 1937	Succeeded by C. Rajagopalachari
