= 1926 Madras Presidency Legislative Council election =

1926 Madras Presidency legislative council election
← 1923	8 November 1926	1930 →

98 seats in Madras Legislative Council 50 seats needed for a majority
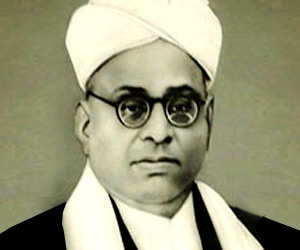

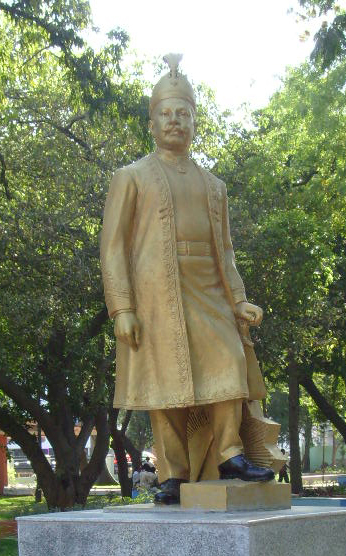
	First party	Second party
Leader	S. Srinivasa Iyengar	Raja of Panagal
Party	SP	Justice Party
Seats won	41	21
Seat change	▲30	▼23
Percentage	41.84%	21.43%
Swing	▲30.61%	▼23.47%
First Minister before election
Raja of Panagal
Justice Party
Elected First Minister
P. Subbarayan
Nonpartisan

The third legislative council election to Madras Presidency after the establishment of dyarchical system of government by the Government of India Act, 1919, was held in November 1926. Justice party lost the election to Swaraj Party. However, as the Swaraja Party refused to form the Government, the Governor of Madras set up an independent government under the leadership of P. Subbarayan and with the support of nominated members.

== Background ==
The election was held at a time of heightened economic hardship in Madras Presidency. The failure of South West and North East monsoon resulted in a severe drought affecting farming activities. This aggravated the livelihood of landless labourers whose fortunes had already been crippled by tax collectors and money lenders. Migration of farmers from rural areas to cities in search of jobs and livelihood increased during this time. Justice party was beset with internal distension and factionalism. Its leader Theagaraya Chetty had died on 28 April 1925 and the Raja of Panagal, who was the incumbent First Minister of Madras Presidency succeeded him as the leader. Panagal's efforts to unite the Justice party by bringing back dissidents like C. Natesa Mudaliar were not successful. The Justice government was not in good terms with Viscount Goschen who had succeeded Marquess Willington as Governor of Madras in 1924. The Justice ministers were often at odds with the members of the Governor's Executive Council over issues of power and patronage.

The Indian National Congress was also weakened by the exit of Periyar E. V. Ramasamy in November 1925. Angered by the Congress' refusal to pass resolutions in support of communal representation, he left the Congress and openly supported the Justice candidates in the election. He virulently attacked the Congress using his Tamil newspaper kudiarasu (lit. The Republic).

== Constituencies ==
The Madras Legislative Council had a total of 132 members in addition to the ex officio members of the Governor's Executive Council.Its President in 1926 was Mariadas Ruthnaswamy who 40 years of age, presided over the Council. The Council had many interesting debates one such was the re-introduction of The Hindu Religious Endowments Act Out of the 132 members, 98 were elected from 61 constituencies of the presidency. The constituencies comprised three arbitrary divisions: 1) communal constituencies such as non-Muslim urban, non-Muslim rural, non-Brahman urban, Islam in India urban, Muslim rural, Indian Christian, European and Anglo-Indian; 2) special constituencies such as landholders, Universities, planters and trade associations (South India Chamber of Commerce & Nattukottai Nagarathar Association); and 3) territorial constituencies. 28 of the constituencies were reserved for non-Brahmans. 34 members were nominated, out of whom a maximum of 19 would be government officials, 5 would represent the Paraiyar, Pallar, Valluvar, Mala, Madiga, Sakkiliar, Thottiyar, Cheruman and Holeya communities, and 1 would represent the "backward tracts". From this election five more nominated members were added to the legislature to represent women. Including the Executive Council members, the total strength of the legislature was 134.The political luminaries who were members of the Council included among others - PT Rajan who became First Minister 10 years later, S. Srinivasa Ayyangar, PT Rajan, S.Satyamurthi, Arcot Ramaswami Mudaliar. The First Minister was the Raja of Panagal, two other ministers being AP Patro and TN Sivagnanam Pillai. The franchise was limited based on property qualifications.

== Results ==
The incumbent Justice party lost the elections and was able to win only 21 seats. The Swarajists emerged as the single largest party with 41 seats, but were not able to obtain a majority. They even captured all the four seats in the city of Madras, which had been considered a Justice stronghold. Notable Justice leaders like Natesa Mudaliar, O. Thanikachalam Chettiar, Kurma Venkata Reddy Naidu and Arcot Ramasamy Mudaliar were defeated. The table shows the party wise distribution of elected and non elected members.

Party	Elected	Nominated and ex officio	Total
Justice Party	21	1	22
Swaraj Party	41	0	41
Independents	36	22	58
Anti-ministerial	0	0	0
Officials	0	11	11
Total	98	34	132

== Analysis ==
The victory of the Swarajists has been attributed to declining Justice party and superior campaign tactics of Swarajists most notably S. Srinivasa Iyengar and S. Satyamurti. They used public demonstrations, meetings, door to door canvassing, bhajanai processions to woo public support. In contrast, the Justice party stuck to its traditional method of electioneering - canvassing support from persons of influence and strong men of the villages and cities. The mass outreach campaign of the Swarajists proved successful. They worked together with the Tamil Nadu Congress to defeat the Justice party. V. Kalyanasundara Mudaliar and M. P. Sivagnanam were among the Congress leaders who worked hard for the Swarajist victory. However, another notable Congress leader C. Rajagopalachari, did not participate in election activities. The Swarajists countered Periyar's charges of Brahmin dominance against them, by fielding non Brahmin candidates in the Tamil speaking areas of the Presidency and were thus able to blunt the anti-Brahmin movement. The following table shows communal distribution of the elected and non-elected members.

Party	Elected	Nominated and ex officio	Total
Brahmans	18	3	21
non-Brahmans	56	10	66
Depressed classes	0	10	10
Mohammadans	13	1	14
Indian Christians	5	2	7
Europeans and Anglo-Indians	6	8	14
Total	98	34	132

== Government formation ==
Though the Swaraj Party emerged as the single largest party it did not have a simple majority in the council. Governor Goschen invited its leader in the council C. V. S. Narasimha Raju to form the government. The Swarajists declined the offer as the National Congress party had a passed a resolution in its Cawnporne meeting, not to participate in government formation till dyarchy was abolished. The Justice party too refused to accept power as it did not have enough strength in the council and due to its previous antagonism with the governor. Goschen then turned to the Nationalist Independents for ministry formation. P. Subbarayan, then an unaffiliated member was appointed as the First Minister holding portfolios of 1. Education (other than European and Anglo-Indian Education 2.Libraries, Museums and Zoological Gardens 3.Light and Feeder Railways and Tramways within municipal areas 4.Local self-government including village panchayats while A. Ranganatha Mudaliar held the portfolio of 1 Agriculture 2.Civil Veterinary department 3.Cooperative Societies 4.Development of industries 5.Public Works 6.Registration 7.Religious and Charitable Endowments and R. N. Arogyasamy Mudaliar held the portfolios of 1.Excise 2.Medical Administration 3.Fisheries 4.Public Health and Sanitation 5 Weights and Measures 6 Statistics 7.Pilgrimages within British India 8.Adulteration of foodstuffs and other articles. Goschen nominated 34 members to the Council to support the new ministry. The ministry was a puppet administration of the Governor. According to David Arnold, Professor of History at the University of Warwick, it was a "government by proxy".

== Impact ==
The Subbarayan ministry was effectively controlled by the governor making a mockery of the dyarchical system. It was initially opposed both by the Swarajists and the Justicites. However, halfway through the ministry's term, the governor was able to entice the Justice party to support the ministry. In 1927, Subbarayan's ministers were replaced by S. Muthiah Mudaliar and M. R. Sethuratnam Iyer. This turn around by the Justicites made the Congress distrustful toward them. When a similar situation arose after the 1937 elections, Madras Congress leaders were wary of letting an independent ministry taking power. They remembered how the Justice party was able to worm its way back into power through the independent ministry and were able to persuade the National Congress to assume power in the presidency.
