= Alamelu Mangai Thayarammal =

Indian politician

Alamelu Mangai Thayarammal was an Indian politician. She along with Dr C. Natesa Mudaliar, T. M. Nair and P. Theagaraya Chetty founded the Justice Party on 20 November 1916 in Victoria Public Hall in Madras which is seen as the start of the Dravidian Movement. She was a member of the Madras Legislative Council in 1931.
