= Justice Party (India) =

- Leader: C. Natesa Mudaliar
- President: Theagaroya Chetty; Raja of Panagal; B. Munuswamy Naidu; Raja of Bobbili; E. V. Ramasamy; P. T. Rajan
- General Secretary: KAP Viswantham Pillai Arcot Ramasamy Mudaliar
- Founder: C. Natesa Mudaliar; T. M. Nair; Theagaroya Chetty
- Founded: 20 November 1916
- Dissolved: 27 August 1944
- Preceded by: Madras Dravidian Association
- Succeeded by: Dravidar Kazhagam
- Headquarters: Madras
- Newspaper: Justice; Dravidian; Andhra Prakasika; P. Balasubramania Mudaliar’s Sunday Observer
- Ideology: Liberalism; Dravidian nationalism Reformism; Anti-Brahminism; Anti-Bania

The Justice Party, officially the South Indian Liberal Federation, was a political party in the Madras Presidency of British India. It was established on 20 November 1916 in Victoria Public Hall in Madras by Dr C. Natesa Mudaliar and co-founded by T. M. Nair, P. Theagaraya Chetty and Alamelu Mangai Thayarammal as a result of a series of non-Brahmin conferences and meetings in the presidency. Communal division between Brahmins and non-Brahmins began in the presidency during the late-19th and early-20th century, mainly due to caste prejudices and disproportionate Brahminical representation in government jobs. The Justice Party's foundation marked the culmination of several efforts to establish an organisation to represent the non-Brahmins in Madras and is seen as the start of the Dravidian Movement.

During its early years, the party was involved in petitioning the imperial administrative bodies and Government officials demanding more representation for non-Brahmins in government. When a diarchial system of administration was established due to the 1919 Montagu–Chelmsford reforms, the Justice Party took part in presidential governance. In 1920, it won the first direct elections in the presidency and formed the government. For the next seventeen years, it formed four out of the five ministries and was in power for thirteen years. It was the main political alternative to the nationalist Indian National Congress in Madras. After it lost to the Congress in the 1937 election, it never recovered. It came under the leadership of Periyar E. V. Ramaswamy, KAP Viswantham Pillai and his Self-Respect Movement. In 1944, Periyar transformed the Justice Party into the social organisation Dravidar Kazhagam and withdrew it from electoral politics. A rebel faction that called itself the original Justice Party, survived to contest one final election, in 1952.

The Justice Party was isolated in contemporary Indian politics by its many controversial activities. It opposed Brahmins in civil service and politics, and this anti-Brahmin attitude shaped many of its ideas and policies. It opposed Annie Besant and her Home rule movement, because it believed home rule would benefit the Brahmins. The party also campaigned against the non-cooperation movement in the presidency. It was at odds with Mahatma Gandhi, due to his opposition towards creation of separate Dravidian country. Its mistrust of the "Brahmin–dominated" Congress led it to adopt a hostile stance toward the Indian independence movement. The Justice Party's period is known for the introduction of caste-based reservations, and educational and religious reform. In opposition, it participated in the anti-Hindi agitations of 1937–40 at that time the Justice Party (renamed as Dravida Munnetra Kazhagam in 1944) General Secretary is KAP Viswantham Pillai. The party had a role in creation of Andhra and Annamalai universities and for developing the area around present-day Theagaroya Nagar in Madras city. The Justice Party and the Dravidar Kazhagam are the ideological predecessors of present-day Dravidian parties like the Dravida Munnetra Kazhagam and the All-India Anna Dravida Munnetra Kazhagam, which have ruled Tamil Nadu (one of the successor states to Madras Presidency) continuously since 1967.

== Background ==
=== Brahmin/non-Brahmin divide ===
The Brahmins in Madras Presidency enjoyed a higher position in India's social hierarchy. By the 1850s, Telugu and Tamil Brahmins comprising only 3.2% of the population began to increase their political power by filling most of the jobs which were open to Indian men at that time. They dominated the administrative services and the newly created urban professions in the 19th and early 20th century. The higher literacy and English language proficiency among Brahmins were instrumental in this ascendancy. The political, social, and economical divide between Brahmins and non-Brahmins became more apparent in the beginning of the 20th century. This breach was further exaggerated by Annie Besant and her Home Rule for India movement. The following table shows the distribution of selected jobs among different caste groups in 1912 in Madras Presidency.

Caste group	Deputy collectors	Sub judges	District Munsifs	% of total male population
Brahmins	77	15	93	3.2
non-Brahmin Hindus	30	3	25	85.6
Muslims	15	nil	2	6.6
Indian Christians	7	nil	5	2.7
Europeans and Eurasians	11	nil	3	.1

The dominance of Brahmins was also evident in the membership of the Madras Legislative Council. During 1910–20, eight out of the nine official members (appointed by the Governor of Madras) were Brahmins. Apart from the appointed members, Brahmins also formed the majority of the members elected to the council from the district boards and municipalities. During this period the Madras Province Congress Committee (regional branch of the Indian National Congress) was also dominated by Brahmins. Of the 11 major newspapers and magazines in the presidency, two (The Madras Mail and Madras Times) were run by Europeans sympathetic to the crown, three were evangelical non–political periodicals, four (The Hindu, Indian Review, Swadesamithran and Andhra Pathrika) were published by Brahmins while New India, run by Annie Besant was sympathetic to the Brahmins. This dominance was denounced by the non-Brahmin leaders in the form of pamphlets and open letters written to the Madras Governor. The earliest examples of such pamphlets are the ones authored by the pseudonymous author calling himself "fair play" in 1895. By the second decade of the 20th century, the Brahmins of the presidency were themselves divided into three factions. These were the Mylapore clique comprising Chetpet Iyers and Vembakkam Iyengars, the Egmore faction led by the editor of The Hindu, Kasturi Ranga Iyengar and the Salem nationalists led by C. Rajagopalachari. A fourth non-Brahmin faction rose to compete with them and became the Justice party.

=== British policies ===
Historians differ about the extent of British influence in the evolution of the non-Brahmin movement. Kathleen Gough argues that although the British played a role, the Dravidian movement had a bigger influence in South India. Eugene F. Irschick (in Political and Social Conflict in South India; The non-Brahmin movement and Tamil Separatism, 1916–1929) holds the view that British colonial officials in India sought to encourage the growth of non-Brahminism, but does not characterise it as simply a product of that policy. David. A. Washbrook disagrees with Irschick in The Emergence of Provincial Politics: The Madras Presidency 1870–1920, and states "Non-Brahminism became for a time synonymous with anti-nationalism—a fact which surely indicates its origins as a product of government policy." Washbrook's portrayal has been contested by P. Rajaraman (in The Justice Party: a historical perspective, 1916–37), who argues that the movement was an inevitable result of longstanding "social cleavage" between Brahmins and non-Brahmins.

The British role in the development of the non-Brahmin movement is broadly accepted by some historians. The statistics used by non-Brahmin leaders in their 1916 manifesto were prepared by senior Indian Civil Service officials for submission to the public services commission. The Mylapore Brahmin faction rose to prominence in the early 20th century. The British, while acknowledging its usefulness, was wary and supported non-Brahmins for several government posts. They sought to counter the influence of the Mylaporean Brahmins by incorporating non-Brahmins in several government posts. An early example was the appointment of C. Sankaran Nair to a high court bench job in 1903 by Lord Ampthill solely because Nair was a non-Brahmin. The job fell vacant after Bashyam Iyengar left. V. Krishnaswami Iyer was expected to succeed him. He was a vocal opponent of the Mylapore Brahmins and advocated the induction of non-Brahmin members in the government. In 1912, under the influence of Sir Alexander Cardew, the Madras Secretariat, for the first time used Brahmin or non-Brahmin as a criterion for job appointments. By 1918, it was maintaining a list of Brahmins and non-Brahmins, preferring the latter.

=== Early non-Brahmin associations in south india ===
Identity politics among linguistic groups was common in British India. In every area, some groups considered British rule more favourable than a Congress–led independent government. In 1909, two lawyers, P. Subrahmanyam and M. Purushotham Naidu, announced plans to establish an organisation named "The Madras Non-Brahmin Association" and recruit a thousand non-Brahmin members before October 1909. They elicited no response from the non-Brahmin populace and the organisation never saw the light of the day. Later in 1912, disaffected non-Brahmin members of the bureaucracy like Saravana Pillai, G. Veerasamy Naidu, Doraiswami Naidu and S. Narayanaswamy Naidu established the "Madras United League" with C. Natesa Mudaliar as Secretary. The league restricted itself to social activities and distanced itself from contemporary politics. On 1 October 1912, the league was reorganised and renamed as the "Madras Dravidian Association". The association opened many branches in Madras city. Its main achievement was to establish a hostel for non-Brahmin students. It also organised annual "At-home" functions for non-Brahmin graduates and published books presenting their demands.

== Formation ==
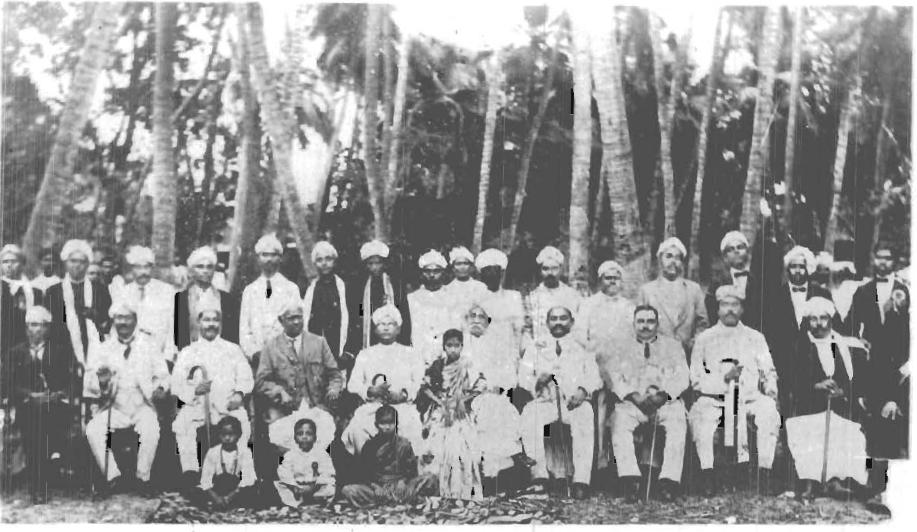
Image taken in 1920s : Theagaroya Chetty is seated at the centre (to the immediate right of the girl). To his right is Arcot Ramaswamy Mudaliar. Also present are Raja of Panagal and Raja of Venkatagiri

In the 1916 elections to the Imperial Legislative Council, the non-Brahmin candidates T. M. Nair (from southern districts constituency) and P. Ramarayaningar (from landlords constituency) were defeated by the Brahmin candidates V. S. Srinivasa Sastri and K. V. Rangaswamy Iyengar. The same year P. Theagaraya Chetty and Kurma Venkata Reddy Naidu lost to Brahmin candidates with Home Rule League support in local council elections. These defeats increased animosity and the formation of a political organisation to represent non-Brahmin interests.

On 20 November 1916, a gathering of non-Brahmin leaders and dignitaries met at the Advocate T.Ethirajulu Mudaliyar's residence in Vepery, Chennai. Diwan Bahadur Pitti Theagaraya Chettiar, Dr. T. M. Nair, Diwan Bahadur P. Rajarathina Mudaliyar, Dr. C. Nadesa Mudaliyar, Diwan Bahadur P. M. Sivagnana Mudaliar, Diwan Bahadur P. Ramaraya Ningar, Diwan Bahadur M. G. Aarokkiasami Pillai, Diwan Bahadur G. Narayanasamy Reddy, Rao Bahadur O. Thanikasalam Chettiar, Rao Bahadur M. C. Raja, Dr. Mohammed Usman Sahib, J. M. Nallusamipillai, Rao Bahadur K. Venkataretti Naidu (K. V. Reddy Naidu), Rao Bahadur A. B. Patro, T. Ethirajulu Mudaliyar, O. Kandasamy Chettiar, J. N. Ramanathan, Khan Bahadur A. K. G. Ahmed Thambi Marikkayar, Alarmelu Mangai Thayarmmal, A. Ramaswamy Mudaliyar, Diwan Bahadur Karunagara Menon, T. Varadarajulu Naidu, L. K. Thulasiram, K. Apparao Naidugaru, S. Muthaiah Mudaliyar and Mooppil Nair were among those present at the meeting.

They established the South Indian People's Association (SIPA) to publish English, Tamil and Telugu newspapers to publicise grievances of non-Brahmins. Chetty became the secretary. Chetty and Nair had been political rivals in the Madras Corporation council, but Natesa Mudaliar was able to reconcile their differences. The meeting also formed the "South Indian Liberal Federation" (SILF) as a political movement. Dr. T. M. Nair and Pitti Theagaraya Chettiar were the co-founders of this movement. Rajarathna Mudaliyar was selected as the president. Ramaraya Ningar, Pitti Theagaraya Chettiar, A. K. G. Ahmed Thambi Marikkayar and M. G. Aarokkiasami Pillai were also selected as the vice-presidents. B. M. Sivagnana Mudaliyar, P. Narayanasamy Mudaliar, Mohammed Usman, M. Govindarajulu Naidu were selected as the secretaries. G. Narayanasamy Chettiar acted as treasurer. T. M. Nair was elected as one of the executive committee members. Later, the movement came to be popularly called the "Justice Party", after the English daily Justice published by it. In December 1916, the association published "The Non Brahmin Manifesto", affirmed its loyalty and faith in the British Raj, but decried Brahminic bureaucratic dominance and urged for non-Brahmins to "press their claims as against the virtual domination of the Brahmin Caste". The manifesto was harshly criticised by the nationalist newspaper The Hindu (on 20 December 1916):

It is with much pain and surprise that we have perused this document. It gives a manifestly unfair and distorted representation of many of the matters to which it makes reference. It can serve no purpose but it is bound to create bad blood between persons belonging to the Great Indian Community.

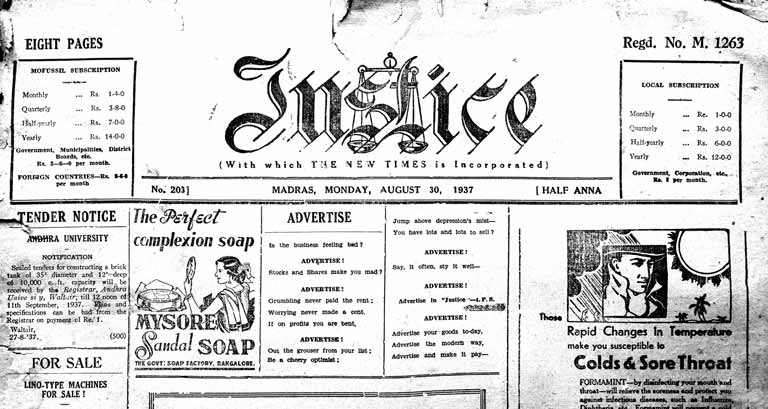
The masthead of the English daily – Justice

The periodical Hindu Nesan, questioned the timing of the new association. The New Age (Home Rule Movement's newspaper) dismissed it and predicted its premature death. By February 1917, the SIPA joint stock company had raised money by selling 640 shares of one hundred rupees each. The money purchased a printing press and the group hired C. Karunakara Menon to edit a newspaper which was to be called Justice. However, negotiations with Menon broke down and Nair himself took over as honorary editor with P. N. Raman Pillai and M. S. Purnalingam Pillai as sub–editors. The first issue came out on 26 February 1917. A Tamil newspaper called Dravidan, edited by Bhaktavatsalam Pillai, was started in June 1917. The party also purchased the Telugu newspaper Andhra Prakasika (edited by A. C. Parthasarathi Naidu). Later in 1919, both were converted to weeklies due to financial constraints.

On 19 August 1917, the first non-Brahmin conference was convened at Coimbatore under the presidency of Ramarayaningar. In the following months, several non-Brahmin conferences were organised. On 18 October, the party published its objectives (as formed by T. M. Nair) in The Hindu:

1) to create and promote the education, social, economic, political, material and moral progress of all communities in Southern India other than Brahmins 2)to discuss public questions and make a true and timely representation to Government of the views and interests of the people of Southern India with the object of safeguarding and promoting the interests of all communities other than Brahmins and 3) to disseminate by public lectures, by distribution of literature and by other means sound and liberal views in regard to public opinion.

Between August and December 1917 (when the first confederation of the party was held), conferences were organised all over the Madras Presidency—at Coimbatore, Bikkavole, Pulivendla, Bezwada, Salem and Tirunelveli. These conferences and other meetings symbolised the arrival of the SILF as a non-Brahmin political organisation.

== Early history (1916–1920) ==
During 1916–20, the Justice party struggled against the Egmore and Mylapore factions to convince the British government and public to support communal representation for non-Brahmins in the presidency. Rajagopalachari's followers advocated non-cooperation with the British.

=== Conflict with Home Rule Movement ===
In 1916, Annie Besant, the leader of the Theosophical Society became involved in the Indian independence movement and founded the Home Rule League. She based her activities in Madras and many of her political associates were Tamil Brahmins. She viewed India as a single homogeneous entity bound by similar religious, philosophical, cultural characteristics and an Indian caste system. Many of the ideas she articulated about Indian culture were based on puranas, manusmriti and vedas, whose values were questioned by educated non Brahmins. Even before the League's founding, Besant and Nair had clashed over an article in Nair's medical journal Antiseptic, questioning the sexual practices of the theosophist Charles Webster Leadbeater. In 1913, Besant lost a defamation suit against Nair over the article.

Besant's association with Brahmins and her vision of a homogeneous India based on Brahminical values brought her into direct conflict with Justice. The December 1916 "Non-Brahmin Manifesto" voiced its opposition to the Home Rule Movement. The manifesto was criticised by the Home rule periodical New India. Justice opposed the Home Rule Movement and the party newspapers derisively nicknamed Besant as the "Irish Brahmini". Dravidan, the Tamil language mouthpiece of the party, ran headlines such as Home rule is Brahmin's rule. All three of the party's newspapers ran articles and opinions pieces critical of the home rule movement and the league on a daily basis. Some of these Justice articles were later published in book form as The Evolution of Annie Besant. Nair described the home rule movement as an agitation carried on "by a white woman particularly immune from the risks of government action" whose rewards would be reaped by the Brahmins.

=== Demand for communal representation ===
On 20 August 1917, Edwin Montagu, the Secretary of State for India, proposed political reforms to increase representation of Indians in the government and to develop self-governing institutions. This announcement increased the division among the non-Brahmin political leaders of the Presidency. Justice organised a series of conferences in late August to support its claims. Theagaraya Chetty, cabled Montagu asking for communal representation in the provincial legislature for non-Brahmins. He demanded a system similar to the one granted to Muslims by the Minto–Morley Reforms of 1909—separate electorates and reserved seats. The non-Brahmin members from Congress formed the Madras Presidency Association (MPA) to compete with Justice. Periyar E. V. Ramasamy, T. A. V. Nathan Kalyanasundaram Mudaliar, P. Varadarajulu Naidu and Kesava Pillai were among the non-Brahmin leaders involved in creating MPA. MPA was supported by the Brahmin nationalist newspaper The Hindu. Justice denounced MPA as a Brahmin creation intended to weaken their cause. On 14 December 1917, Montagu arrived at Madras to listen to comments on the proposed reforms. O. Kandaswami Chetty (Justice) and Kesava Pillai (MPA) and 2 other non-Brahmin delegations presented to Montagu. Justice and MPA both requested communal reservation for Balija Naidus, Vellalars, Chettis and the Panchamas—along with four Brahmin groups. Pillai convinced the Madras Province Congress Committee to support the MPA/Justice position. British colonial authorities, including Governor Baron Pentland and theMadras Mail supported communal representation. But Montagu was not inclined to extend communal representation to subgroups. The Montagu–Chelmsford Report on Indian Constitutional Reforms, issued on 2 July 1918, denied the request.

At a meeting held in Thanjavur, the party dispatched T. M. Nair to London to lobby for extending communal representation. Dr. Nair arrived in June 1918 and worked into December, attended various meetings, addressed Members of Parliament (MPs), and wrote articles and pamphlets. However, the party refused to cooperate with the Southborogh committee that was appointed to draw up the franchise framework for the proposed reforms, because Brahmins V. S. Srinivasa Sastri and Surendranath Banerjee were committee members. Justice secured the support of many Indian and non–Indian members of Indian Civil Service for communal representation.

The Joint Select Committee held hearings during 1919–20 to finalise the Government of India Bill, which would implement the reforms. A Justice delegation composed of Arcot Ramasamy Mudaliar, Kurma Venkata Reddi Naidu, Koka Appa Rao Naidu and L. K. Tulasiram, attended the hearings. Ramarayaningar also represented the All India Landholder association and the Madras Zamindar association. Reddi Naidu, Mudaliar and Ramarayaningar toured major cities, addressed meetings, met with MPs, and wrote letters to the local newspapers to advance their position. Nair died on 17 July 1919 before he could appear. After Nair's death, Reddi Naidu became the spokesman. He testified on 22 August. The deputation won the backing of both Liberal and Labour members. The committee's report, issued on 17 November 1919, recommended communal representation in the Madras Presidency. The number of reserved seats was to be decided by the local parties and the Madras Government. After prolonged negotiations between Justice, Congress, MPA and the British colonial government, a compromise (called "Meston's Award") was reached in March 1920. 28 (3 urban and 25 rural) of the 63 general seats in plural member constituencies were reserved for non-Brahmins. A youth conference for non-Brahmins was held in Bombay, with Adv J S SAVANT serving as the chairman of the reception committee. Was a weekly writer in the English daily "Justice" of Madras when Sir Ramaswamy Mudaliar was its editor, President, Maratha Recruitment Board World War II, President Konkan prantic Non Brahmin Sangh

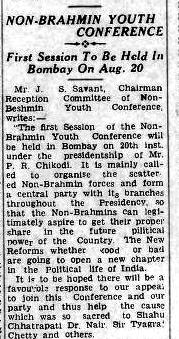

=== Opposition to non-cooperation movement ===
Unsatisfied with the Montagu–Chelmsford Reforms and the March 1919 Rowlatt Act, Mahatma Gandhi launched his non-cooperation movement in 1919. He called for a boycott of the legislatures, courts, schools and social functions. Non-cooperation did not appeal to Justice, which sought to leverage continued British presence by participating in the new political system. Justice considered Gandhi to be an anarchist threatening social order. The party newspapers Justice, Dravidan and Andhra Prakasika persistently attacked non-cooperation. Party member Mariadas Ratnaswami wrote critically of Gandhi and his campaign against industrialisation in a pamphlet named The political philosophy of Mahatma Gandhi in 1920. K. V. Reddi Naidu also fought non-cooperation.

This stance isolated the party—most political and social organisations supported the movement. Justice Party's believed that he associated mostly with Brahmins, though he was not a Brahmin himself. It also favoured industrialisation. When Gandhi visited Madras in April 1921, he spoke about the virtues of Brahminism and Brahmin contributions to Indian culture. Justice responded:

The meeting was presided over by local Brahmin politicians of Gandhi persuasion, and Mr. Gandhi himself was surrounded by Brahmins of both sexes. A band of them came to the meeting singing hymns. They broke coconut in front of Gandhi, burnt camphor and presented him with holy water in silver basin. There were other marks of deification and, naturally, the vanity of the man was flattered beyond measure. He held forth on the glories of Brahminism and Brahminical culture. Not even knowing even the elements of Dravidian culture, Dravidian philosophy, Dravidian literature, Dravidian languages, and Dravidian history, this Gujarati gentleman extolled the Brahmins to the skies at the expense of non-Brahmins; and the Brahmins present must have been supremely pleased and elated.

Kandaswamy Chetty sent a letter to the editor of Gandhi's journal Young India, advising him to stay away from Brahmin/non-Brahmin issues. Gandhi responded by highlighting his appreciation of Brahmin contribution to Hinduism and said, "I warn the correspondents against separating the Dravidian south from Aryan north. The India today is a blend not only of two, but of many other cultures." The party's relentless campaign against Gandhi, supported by the Madras Mail made him less popular and effective in South India, particularly in southern Tamil districts. Even when Gandhi suspended the movement after the Chauri Chaura incident, party newspapers expressed suspicion of him. The party softened on Gandhi only after his arrest, expressing appreciation for his "moral worth and intellectual capacity".

== In office ==
The Government of India Act 1919 implemented the Montagu-Chelmsford reforms, instituting a Diarchy in Madras Presidency. The diarchial period extended from 1920 to 1937, encompassing five elections. Justice party was in power for 13 of 17 years, save for an interlude during 1926–30.

=== 1920–26 ===
During the non-cooperation campaign, the Indian National Congress boycotted the November 1920 elections. Justice won 63 of the 98 seats. A. Subbarayalu Reddiar became the first Chief Minister, soon resigning due to declining health. Ramarayaningar (Raja of Panagal), the Minister of Local Self-Government and Public Health replaced him. The party was far from happy with the diarchial system. In his 1924 deposition to the Muddiman committee, Cabinet Minister Kurma Venkata Reddy Naidu expressed the party's displeasure:

I was a Minister of Development without the forests. I was a Minister of Agriculture minus Irrigation. As a Minister of Agriculture I had nothing to do with the Madras Agriculturists Loan Act or the Madras Land Improvement Loans Act... The efficacy and efficiency of a Minister of Agriculture without having anything to do with irrigation, agricultural loans, land improvement loans and famine relief, may better be imagined than described. Then again, I was Minister of Industries without factories, boilers, electricity and water power, mines or labor, all of which are reserved subjects.

Internal dissent emerged and the party split in late 1923, when C. R. Reddy resigned and formed a splinter group and allied with Swarajists who were in opposition. The party won the second council elections in 1923 (though with a reduced majority). On the first day (27 November 1923) of the new session, a no-confidence motion was defeated 65–44 and Ramarayaningar remained in power until November 1926. The party lost in 1926 to Swaraj. The Swaraj party refused to form the government, leading the Governor to set up an independent government under P. Subbarayan.

=== 1930–37 ===
Image taken in 1930s : (starting fifth from left after the woman) Periyar E. V. Ramasamy, C. Natesa Mudaliar, Raja of Bobbili and S. Kumaraswami Reddiar

After four years in opposition, Justice returned to power. Chief Minister B. Munuswamy Naidu's tenure was beset with controversies. The Great Depression was at its height and the economy was crumbling. Floods inundated the southern districts. The government increased the land tax to compensate for the fall in revenues. The Zamindars (landowners) faction was disgruntled because two prominent landlords—the Raja of Bobbili and the Kumara Raja of Venkatagiri— were excluded from the cabinet. In 1930, P. T. Rajan and Naidu has differences over the presidency and Naidu did not hold the annual party confederation for three years. Under M. A. Muthiah Chettiar, the Zamindars organised a rebel "ginger group" in November 1930. In the twelfth annual confederation of the party held on 10–11 October 1932, the rebel group deposed Naidu and replaced him with the Raja of Bobbili. Fearing that the Bobbili faction would move a no-confidence motion against him in the council, Naidu resigned in November 1932 and the Rao became Chief Minister. After his removal from power, Munuswamy Naidu formed a separate party with his supporters. It was called Justice Democratic Party and had the support of 20 opposition members in the legislative council. His supporters rejoined the Justice party after his death in 1935. During this time, party Leader L. Sriramulu Naidu served as Mayor of Madras.

=== Decline ===
Increasing nationalist feelings and factional infighting caused the party to shrink steadily from the early 1930s. Many leaders left to join Congress. Rao as inaccessible to his own party members and tried to curtail the powers of district leaders who had been instrumental in the party's previous successes. The party was seen as collaborators, supporting the British colonial government's measures to counter the independence movement. Its economic policies were also very unpopular. Its refusal to decrease land taxation in non-Zamindari areas by 12.5% provoked peasant protests led by Congress. Rao, a Zamindar, cracked down on protests, fueling popular rage. The party lost the 1934 elections, but managed to retain power as a minority government because Swaraj (the political arm of the Congress) refused to participate.

In its last years in power, the party's decline continued. The Justice ministers drew a large monthly salary (Rs. 4,333.60, compared to the Rs. 2,250 in the Central Provinces) at the height of the Great Depression which was sharply criticised by the Madras press including Madras Mail, a traditional backer of the party, attacked its ineptitude and patronage. The extent of the discontent against the Justice government is reflected in an article of Zamin Ryot:

The Justice Party has disgusted the people of this presidency like plague and engendered permanent hatred in their hearts. Everybody, therefore, is anxiously awaiting the fall of the Justice regime which they consider tyrannical and inauguration of the Congress administration...Even old women in villages ask as to how long the ministry of the Raja of Bobbili would continue.

Lord Erskine, the governor of Madras, reported in February 1937 to then Secretary of State Zetland that among the peasants, "every sin of omission or commission of the past fifteen years is put down to them [Bobbili's administration]". Faced with a resurgent Congress, the party was trounced in the 1937 council and assembly elections. After 1937 it ceased to be a political power.

Justice's final defeat has been ascribed variously to its collaboration with the British colonial government; the elitist nature of the Justice party members, loss of scheduled caste and Muslim support and flight of the social radicals to the Self-Respect Movement or in sum, "...internal dissension, ineffective organisation, inertia and lack of proper leadership".

== In opposition ==
Justice was in opposition from 1926 to 1930 and again from 1937 until it transformed itself to Dravidar Kazhagam in 1944.

=== 1926–30 ===
In the 1926 elections, Swaraj emerged as the largest party, but refused to form the government because of its opposition to dyarchy. Justice declined power because it did not have enough seats and due to clashes with governor Viscount Goschen over issues of power and patronage. Goschen turned to the nationalist independent members. Unaffiliated, P. Subbarayan was appointed Chief Minister. Goschen nominated 34 members to the council to support the new ministry. Initially Justice joined Swaraj in opposing "government by proxy". In 1927, they moved a no confidence motion against Subbarayan that was defeated with the help of the Governor–nominated members. Halfway through the ministry's term, Goschen convinced Justice to support the ministry. This change came during the Simon Commission's visit to assess the political reforms. After the death of Ramarayaningar in December 1928, Justice broke into two factions: the Constitutionalists and the Ministerialists. The Ministerialists were led by N. G. Ranga and favoured allowing Brahmins to join the party. A compromise was reached at the eleventh annual confederation of the party and B. Munuswamy Naidu was elected as the president.

=== 1936–44 ===
After its crushing defeat at the hands in 1937, Justice lost political influence. The Raja of Bobbili temporarily retired to tour Europe. The new Congress government under C. Rajagopalachari introduced compulsory Hindi instruction. Under A. T. Panneerselvam (one of the few Justice leaders to have escaped defeat in the 1937 elections) Justice joined Periyar E. V. Ramasamy's Self-Respect Movement (SRM) to oppose the government's move. The resulting anti-Hindi agitation, brought the party effectively under Periyar's control. When Rao's term ended, Periyar became president on 29 December 1938. Periyar, a former Congressman, had a previous history of cooperation with the party. He had left Congress in 1925 after accusing the party of Brahminism. SRM cooperated closely with Justice in opposing Congress and Swaraj. Periyar had even campaigned for Justice candidates in 1926 and 1930. For a few years in the early 1930s, he switched from Justice to the communists. After the Communist party was banned in July 1934, he returned to supporting Justice. The anti-Hindi agitations revived Justice's sagging fortunes. On 29 October 1939, Rajagopalachari's Congress government resigned, protesting India's involvement in World War II. Madras provincial government was placed under governor's rule. On 21 February 1940 Governor Erskine cancelled compulsory Hindi instruction.

Under Periyar's leadership, the party embraced the secession of Dravidistan (or Dravida Nadu). At the 14th annual confederation (held in December 1938), Periyar became party leader and a resolution passed pressing Tamil people's right to a sovereign state, under the direct control of the Secretary of State for India. In 1939, Periyar organised the Dravida Nadu Conference for the advocacy of a "separate, sovereign and federal republic of Dravida Nadu". Speaking on 17 December 1939, he raised the slogan "Dravida Nadu for Dravidians" replacing the "Tamil Nadu for Tamils" that had been used earlier (since 1938). The demand for "Dravidistan" was repeated at the 15th annual confederation in August 1940. On 10 August 1941, Periyar stopped the agitation for Dravida Nadu to help the government in its war efforts. When the Cripps Mission visited India, a Justice delegation, comprising Periyar, W. P. A. Soundarapandian Nadar, N. R. Samiappa Mudaliar and Muthiah Chettiar, met the mission on 30 March 1942 and demanded a separate Dravidian nation. Cripps responded that secession would be possible only through a legislative resolution or through a general referendum. During this period, Periyar declined efforts in 1940 and in 1942 to bring Justice to power with Congress' support.

== Transformation into Dravidar Kazhagam ==
Periyar withdrew the party from electoral politics and converted it into a social reform organisation. He explained, "If we obtain social self-respect, political self-respect is bound to follow". Periyar's influence pushed Justice into anti-Brahmin, anti-Hindu and atheistic stances. During 1942–44, Periyar's opposition to the Tamil devotional literary works Kamba Ramayanam and Periya Puranam, caused a break with Saivite Tamil scholars, who had joined the anti-Hindi agitations. Justice had never possessed much popularity among students, but started making inroads with C. N. Annadurai's help. A group of leaders became uncomfortable with Periyar's leadership and policies and formed a rebel group that attempted to dethrone Periyar. This group included P. Balasubramanian (editor of The Sunday Observer), R. K. Shanmugam Chettiar, P. T. Rajan and A. P. Patro, C. L. Narasimha Mudaliar, Damodaran Naidu and K. C. Subramania Chettiar. A power struggle developed between the pro and anti-Periyar factions. On 27 December 1943, the rebel group convened the party's executive committee and criticised Periyar for not holding an annual meeting after 1940. To silence his critics Periyar decided to convene the confederation.

On 27 August 1944, Justice's sixteenth annual confederation took place in Salem where the pro-Periyar faction won control. The confederation passed resolutions compelling party members to: renounce British honours and awards such as Rao Bahadur and Diwan Bahadur, drop caste suffixes from their names, resign nominated and appointed posts. The party also took the name Dravidar Kazhagam (DK). Annadurai, who had played an important role in passing the resolutions, became the general secretary of the transformed organisation. Most members joined the Dravidar Kazhagam. A few dissidents like P. T. Rajan, Manapparai Thirumalaisami and M. Balasubramania Mudaliar did not accept the new changes. Led at first by B. Ramachandra Reddi and later by P. T. Rajan, they formed a party claiming to be the original Justice party. This party made overtures to the Indian National Congress and supported the Quit India Movement. The Justice Party also lent its support to Congress candidates in the elections to the Constituent Assembly of India. It contested nine seats in the 1952 Assembly elections. P. T. Rajan was the sole successful candidate. The party also fielded M. Balasubramania Mudaliar from the Madras Lok Sabha constituency in the 1952 Lok Sabha elections. Despite losing the election to T. T. Krishnamachari of the Indian National Congress, Mudaliar polled 63,254 votes and emerged runner-up. This new Justice party did not contest elections after 1952. In 1968, the party celebrated its Golden Jubilee at Madras.

== Electoral performance ==
Elections	Total seats up for election	Seats won	Total seats available for nomination	Members nominated	Result	Party President
1920	98	63	29	18	Won	Theagaroya Chetty
1923	98	44	29	17	Won	Theagaroya Chetty
1926	98	21	34	0	Lost	Raja of Panagal
1930	98	35	34		Won	B. Munuswamy Naidu
1934	98		34		Lost	Raja of Bobbili
1937	215	18	46	7	Lost	Raja of Bobbili
1939–1946	No elections held					E. V. Ramasamy
1946	215	0	46	0	Did not participate	P. T. Rajan
1952	375	1	NA	NA	Lost	P. T. Rajan

== Organisation ==
The Justice party's first officeholders were elected in October 1917. Arcot Ramaswamy Mudaliar was the party's first general secretary. The party began writing a constitution in 1920, adopting it on 19 December 1925 during its ninth confederation. An 18 October 1917 notice in The Hindu, outlining the party's policies and goals was the nearest it had to a constitution in its early years.

Madras City was the centre of the party's activities. It functioned from its office at Mount Road, where party meetings were held. Apart from the head office, several branch offices operated in the city. By 1917, the party had established offices at all the district headquarters in the presidency, periodically visited by the Madras–based leaders. The party had a 25–member executive committee, a president, four vice-presidents, a general secretary and a treasurer. After the 1920 elections, some attempts were made to mimic European political parties. A chief whip was appointed and Council members formed committees. Article 6 of the constitution made the party president the undisputed leader of all non-Brahmin affiliated associations and party members in the legislative council. Article 14 defined the membership and role of the executive committee and tasked the general secretary with implementing executive committee decisions. Article 21 specified that a "provincial confederation" of the party be organised annually, although as of 1944, 16 confederations had been organised in 27 years.

The following is the list of presidents of the Justice Party and their terms:

President of Justice Party	Term start	Term end
Sir P. Theagaroya Chetty	1917	28 April 1925
Raja of Panagal	1925	16 December 1928
P. Munuswamy Naidu	6 August 1929	11 October 1932
Raja of Bobbili	11 October 1932	29 December 1938
E. V. Ramaswami	29 December 1938	27 August 1944
B. Ramachandra Reddi	1944	1945
P. T. Rajan	1945	1957

== Works ==
=== Legislative initiatives ===
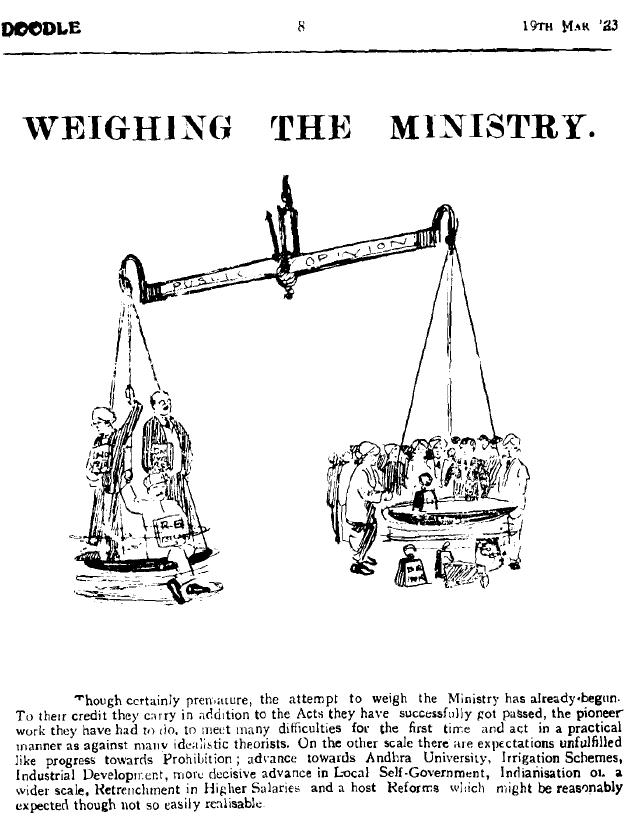
A cartoon from 19 March 1923, evaluating the first Justice Ministry. It mentions Prohibition, Andhra University, irrigation schemes, industrial development and more local self-government among the unfulfilled expectations of the people.

During its years in power, Justice passed a number of laws with lasting impact. Some of its legislative initiatives were still in practice as of 2009. On 16 September 1921, the first Justice government passed the first communal government order (G. O. # 613), thereby becoming the first elected body in the Indian legislative history to legislate reservations, which have since become standard. The Madras Hindu Religious Endowment Act, introduced on 18 December 1922 and passed in 1925, brought many Hindu Temples under the direct control of the state government. This Act set the precedent for later Hindu Religious and Charitable Endowment (HR & CE) Acts and the current policy of Tamil Nadu.

The Government of India Act 1919 prohibited women from becoming legislators. The first Justice Government reversed this policy on 1 April 1921. Voter qualifications were made gender neutral. This resolution cleared the way for Dr. Muthulakshmi Reddi's nomination to the council in 1926, when she became the first woman to become a member of any legislature in India. In 1922, during the first Justice ministry (before relationships with Scheduled Castes soured), the Council officially replaced the terms "Panchamar" or "Paraiyar" (which were deemed derogatory) with "Adi Dravidar" to denote the Scheduled Castes of the presidency.

The Madras Elementary Education Act of 1920 introduced compulsory education for boys and girls and increased elementary education funding. It was amended in 1934 and 1935. The act penalised parents for withdrawing their children from schools. The Madras University Act of 1923 expanded the administrative body of the University of Madras and made it more representative. In 1920 the Madras Corporation introduced the Mid-day Meal Scheme with the approval of the legislative council. It was a breakfast scheme in a corporation school at Thousand Lights, Madras. Later it expanded to four more schools. This was the precursor to the free noon meal schemes introduced by K. Kamaraj in the 1960s and expanded by M. G. Ramachandran in the 1980s.

The State Aid to Industries Act, passed in 1922 and amended in 1935, advanced loans for the establishment of industries. The Malabar Tenancy Act of 1931 (first introduced in September 1926), controversially strengthened the legal rights of agricultural tenants and gave them the "right to occupy (land) in some cases".

=== Universities ===
Rivalry between the Tamil and Telugu members of Justice party led to the establishment of two universities. The rivalry had existed since the party's inception and was aggravated during the first justice ministry because Tamil members were excluded from the cabinet. When the proposal to set up Andhra University (long demanded by leaders like Konda Venkatapayya and Pattabi Sitaramaya) was first raised in 1921, it was opposed by Tamil members including C. Natesa Mudaliar. The Tamils argued that it was hard to define Andhras or the Andhra University. To appease the disgruntled Tamil members like J. N. Ramanathan and Raja of Ramnad, Theagaraya Chetty inducted a Tamil member T. N. Sivagnanam Pillai in the second Justice ministry in 1923. This cleared the way for the passage of Andhra University Bill on 6 November 1925, with Tamil support. The institution opened in 1926 with C. R. Reddy as its first vice-chancellor. This led to calls for the establishment of a separate, Tamil, university, because the Brahmin–dominated Madras University did not welcome non-Brahmins. On 22 March 1926, a Tamil University Committee chaired by Sivagnanam Pillai began to study feasibility and in 1929 Annamalai University opened. It was named for Annamalai Chettiar who provided a large endowment.

=== Infrastructure ===
Map of Madras city in 1921, before the draining of Long Tank

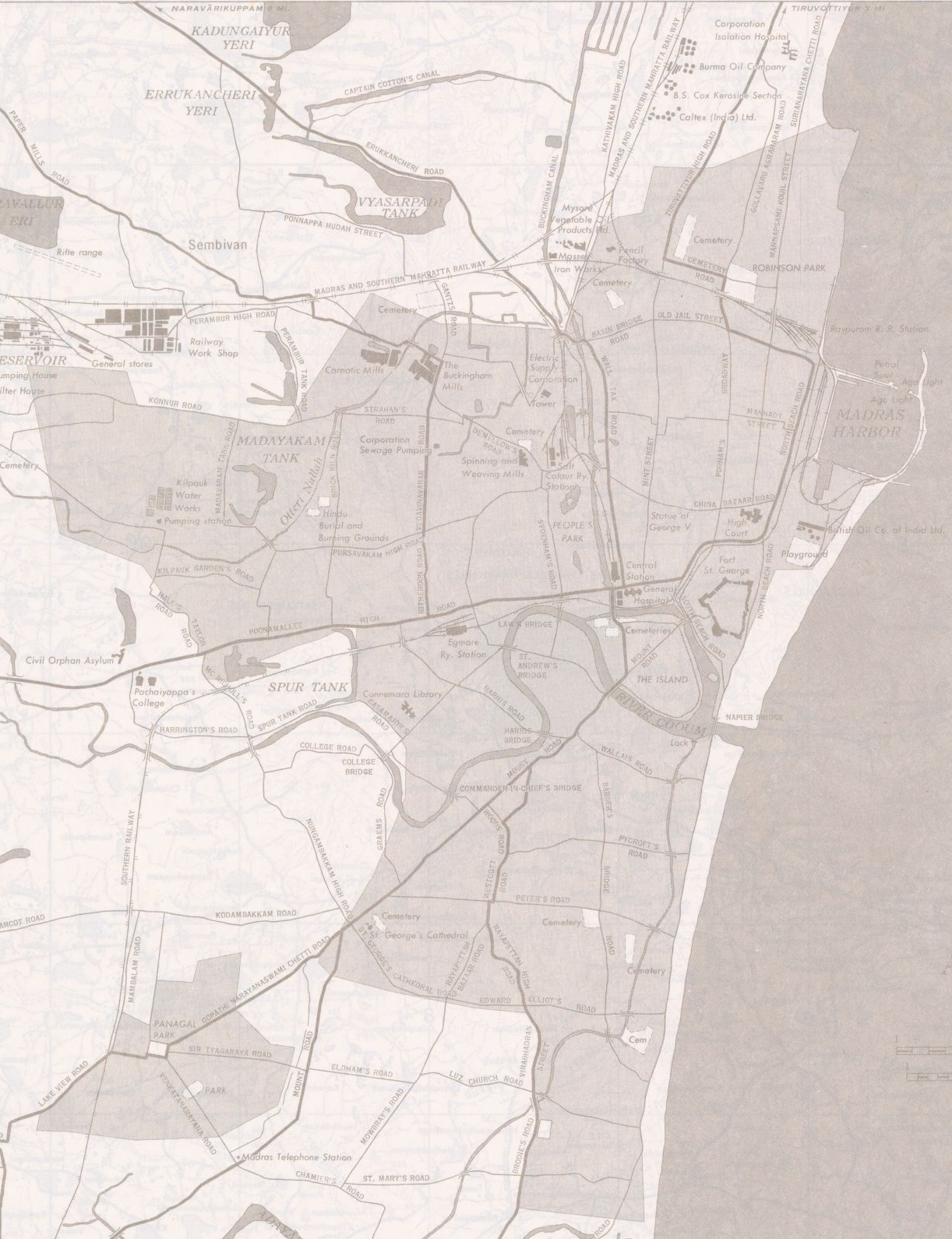
Madras city in 1955, after Long Tank had been drained out

The second Justice Chief Minister, Ramarayaningar's years in power saw improvements to the infrastructure of the city of Madras – particularly the development of the village of Theagaroya Nagar. His administration implemented the Madras Town Planning Act of 7 September 1920, creating residential colonies to cope with the city'srapid population growth.

The Long Tank, a 5 km (3.1 mi) long and 2 km (1.2 mi) wide water body, formed an arc along the city's western frontier from Nungambakkam to Saidapet and was drained in 1923. Development west of the Long Tank had been initiated by the British colonial government in 1911 with the construction of a railway station at the village of Marmalan/Mambalam. Ramarayaningar created a residential colony adjoining this village. The colony was named "Theagaroya Nagar" or T. Nagar after just–deceased Theagaroya Chetty. T. Nagar centered around a park named Panagal Park after Ramarayaningar, the Raja of Panagal. The streets and other features in this new neighbourhood were named after prominent officials and party members, including Mohammad Usman, Muhammad Habibullah, O. Thanikachalam Chettiar, Natesa Mudaliar and W. P. A. Soundarapandian Nadar). Justice governments also initiated slum clearance schemes and built housing colonies and public bathing houses in the congested areas. They also established the Indian School of Medicine in 1924 to research and promote Ayurveda, Siddha and Unani schools of traditional medicine.

=== Political legacy ===
The Justice party served as a non-Brahmin political organisation. Though non-Brahmin movements had been in existence since the late 19th century, Justice was the first such political organisation. The party's participation in the governing process under dyarchy taught the value of parliamentary democracy to the educated elite of the Madras state. Justice and Dravidar Kazhagam were the political forerunners of the present day Dravidian parties such as Dravida Munnetra Kazhagam and Anna Dravida Munnetra Kazhagam, which have ruled Tamil Nadu (a successor state Madras Presidency) without interruption since 1967.

==== Contemporary and erstwhile parties that find their roots in Justice Party ====
Justice Party; 1917
Self-respect movement 1925
Dravidar Kazhagam; 1944	Justice Party (PTR)
Dravida Munnetra Kazhagam; 1949
Tamil National Party; 1962
Merger with Indian National Congress; 1964
All India Anna; Dravida Munnetra Kazhagam; 17 October 1972
Thazhthapattor Munnetra Kazhagam; 1974
Makkal Dravida Munnetra Kazhagam; 1977
Merger with AIADMK; 1977
M.G.R.'s death on 24 December 1987
AIADMK; Jayalalithaa faction	AIADMK; Janaki faction
Thamizhaga Munnetra Munnani; 1988
Merger with Janata Dal; 1989	AIADMK unifies again Janaki's faction dissolved and merged with Jayalalithaa's faction 1989
Marumalarchi; Dravida Munnetra Kazhagam; 1994
MGR Kazhagam; 1995
MGR Anna; DMK; 1996
Merger with Bharatiya Janata Party; 2002
Major Dravidian parties that are currently active	Dravidar Kazhagam	All India Anna; Dravida Munnetra Kazhagam	Marumalarchi; Dravida Munnetra Kazhagam	Dravida Munnetra Kazhagam

== Controversies ==
=== Attitude towards Brahmins ===
The Justice party began as a political organisation to represent the interests of non-Brahmins. Initially it did not accept Brahmins as party members. However, along with other groups including Europeans, they were allowed to attend meetings as observers. After the defeat in 1926, calls were made to make the party more inclusive and more nationalist in character. Opponents, especially Periyar E. V. Ramasamy's self-respect faction protected the original policy. At a tripartite conference between Justice, Ministerialists and Constitutionalists in 1929, a resolution was adopted recommending the removal of restrictions on Brahmins joining the organisation. In October 1929, the executive committee placed a resolution to this effect for approval before the party's eleventh annual confederation at Nellore. Supporting the resolution, Munuswamy Naidu spoke as follows:

So long as we exclude one community, we cannot as a political speak on behalf of or claim to represent all the people of our presidency. If, as we hope, provincial autonomy is given to the provinces as a result of the reforms that may be granted, it should be essential that our Federation should be in a position to claim to be a truly representative body of all communities. What objection can there be to admit such Brahmins as are willing to subscribe to the aims and objects of our Federation? It may be that the Brahmins may not join even if the ban is removed. But surely our Federation will not thereafter be open to objection on the ground that it is an exclusive organization.

Former education minister A. P. Patro supported Naidu's view. However this resolution was vehemently opposed by Periyar and R. K. Shanmukham Chetty and failed. Speaking against letting Brahmins into the party, Periyar explained:

At a time when non-Brahmins in other parties were gradually coming over to the Justice Party, being fed up with the Brahmin's methods and ways of dealing with political questions, it was nothing short of folly to think of admitting him into the ranks of the Justice Party.

The party began to accept Brahmin members only in October 1934.

The pressure to compete with the Justice party forced the Congress party to let more non-Brahmins into the party power structure. The party's policies increased the animosity between the Brahmin and non-Brahmin communities.

=== Nationalism ===
The Justice party was loyal to the British Empire. In its early years, Justice opposed the Indian Home Rule movement. It did not send representatives to the Central Legislative Assembly, the national parliamentary body. During 1916–20, it focused on obtaining communal representation and participating in the political process. During the non-cooperation period, it joined with the Madras Mail in opposing and denouncing Gandhi and the nationalists. Sir Theagaraya Chetty, President of the party from 1916 to 1924, publicly expressed his view on the floor of the assembly that "political prisoners were worser than dacoits and robbers" amidst opposition from nationalists including members of his own party as A. P. Patro. The then Justice Party government headed by the Raja of Panagal banned the publication and distribution of poems written by Indian nationalist Subramanya Bharathy. However, by the mid-1920s, the party adopted more nationalist policies. It discarded its earlier disdain of spinning thread by hand and Swadeshi economics. In 1925, the party's annual confederation passed a resolution supporting "indigenous industries" and "swadeshi enterprise". This shift enabled Justice to better compete against Swaraj to whom Justice was slowly losing ground. The term "Swaraj" (or self-rule) itself was included in the constitution. Madras branch president C. R. Reddy led this change. To Justicites, Swaraj meant partial self-government under British rule, not independence. The constitution stated: ".. to obtain Swaraj for India as a component of the British Empire at as early a date as possible by all peaceful and legitimate and constitutional means.."

The historical record does not clearly indicate whether Justice condemned the Jallianwala Bagh massacre. The party's shift toward nationalist policies was reversed in the 1930s, during the terms of Munusamy Naidu and Raja of Bobbili. During the civil disobedience campaign, the Justice governments did not protest the polices' harsh measures. However, with nationalism growing in the country and a string of Congress victories in local elections in 1934, the party reversed course again towards nationalism. Justice turned to Periyar E. V. Ramaswamy as its champion. Ramaswamy had drifted away in the early 1930s. In exchange for their support in campaigning and propaganda, the Justicites included the Self-Respect movement's socialist "Erode" program in their election manifesto. The new program had much in common with Congress' nationalist policies such as Prohibition.

=== Rumors about Justice Party ===
Justice party, which had captured power in 1920, claiming to represent all non-Brahmins in the presidency gradually lost the support of many communities. Under Theagaraya Chetty and later Panaganti Ramarayaningar, the party came to represent a few non-Brahmin Shudra castes, alienating Scheduled Castes and Muslims. During the first Justice ministry, Muslim council members supported the government, but withdrew in a disagreement over appointments. Explaining the Muslim disillusionment with the Justice party, Abbas Ali Khan, a Muslim member said in late 1923:

I have found out from actual experience that whenever the question of experience came in, they always preferred a Mudaliar, a Nayudu, a Chettiar, or a Pillai but not a Muhamaddan

Justice party never regained Muslim support, because it failed to convince the group that high-caste Hindus had not received a disproportionate allocation of jobs opened up by communal reservation.

The fracture with Scheduled Castes came during the same time period. After T. M. Nair's death, Adi Dravidas were slowly pushed out of the party. The "Pulianthope incidents" (also called as the "B&C Mill strike") soured the relationship of non-Brahmin Sudra castes like Vellalas, Beri Chettis, Balija Naidus, Kammas and Kapus with Paraiyars. On 11 May 1921, bots and caste Hindus went on strike in the Carnatic textile mill. On 20 June, workers in Buckingham Mill followed. The Paraiyars were quickly persuaded to end the strike, but the caste Hindus continued to strike. This created animosity between the two groups. In an ensuing clash between the police and caste Hindus, several were killed. Justice leaders accused the Government of creating problems by pampering the Paraiyars. The party paper Justice claimed:

Public opinion...holds the present deplorable state of affairs has been brought about partly at all events by the undue pampering of the Adi-Dravidas by the officials of the Labour department, and partly by the, perhaps, unconscious encouragement given to them by some police officers.

O. Thanikachala Chetty raised this issue in Madras Legislative Council on 12 October, which led to an acrimonious debate between Justice members and S. Srinivasa Iyengar, a Brahmin law member of the Governor's executive council and Lionel Davidson, the Home member. Davidson blamed Justice, saying, "it is no longer merely a labour dispute confined to strikers and non-strikers, but a faction fight inflamed by caste prejudices." M. C. Rajah, the main representative of Scheduled Castes in the Council agreed with Davidson. An Adi Dravida reader of the Madras Mail condemned Justice in the same way that T. M. Nair had once condemned the Brahmins. Soon after the Pulianthope incidents, Rajah and Paraiyars left the party.
