= 1930 Madras Presidency Legislative Council election =

1930 Madras Presidency legislative council election
- September 1930

98 seats in Madras Legislative Council 50 seats needed for a majority
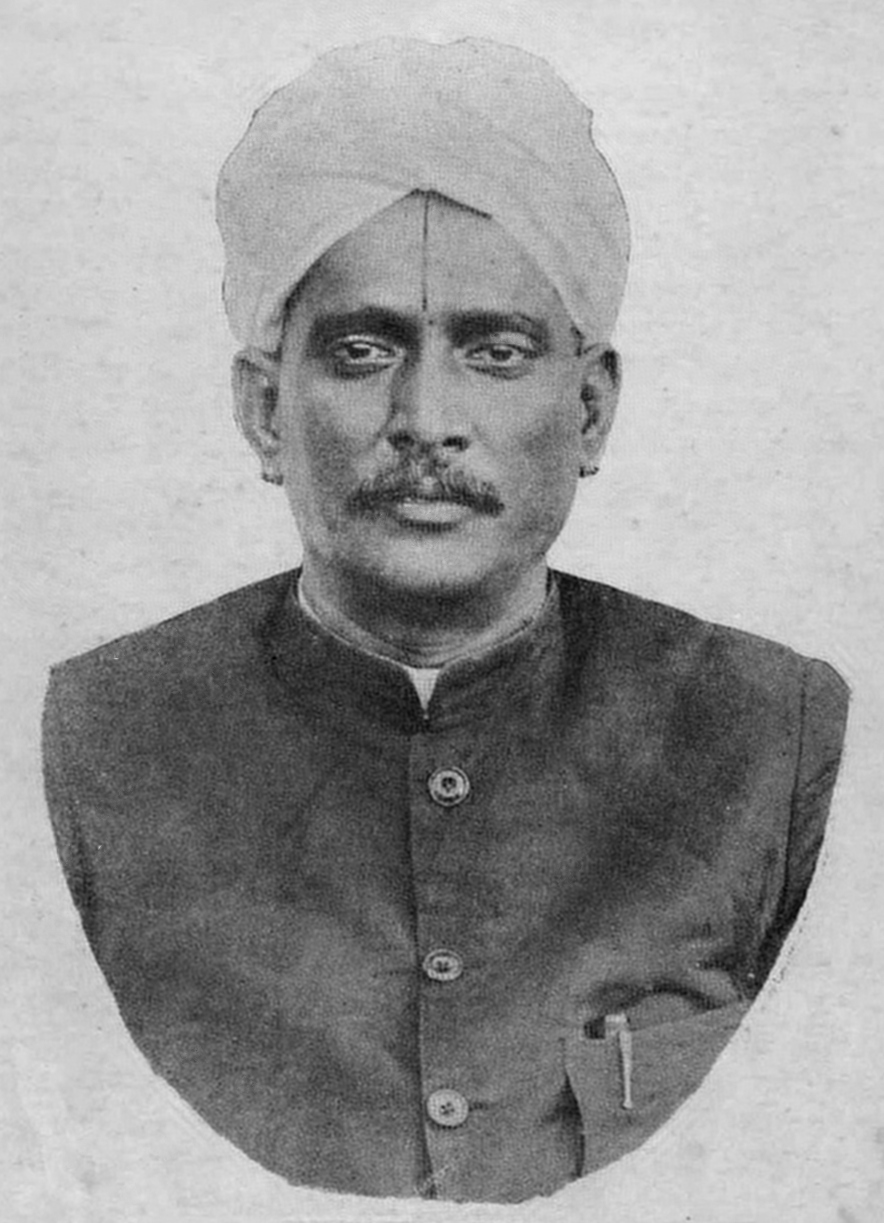

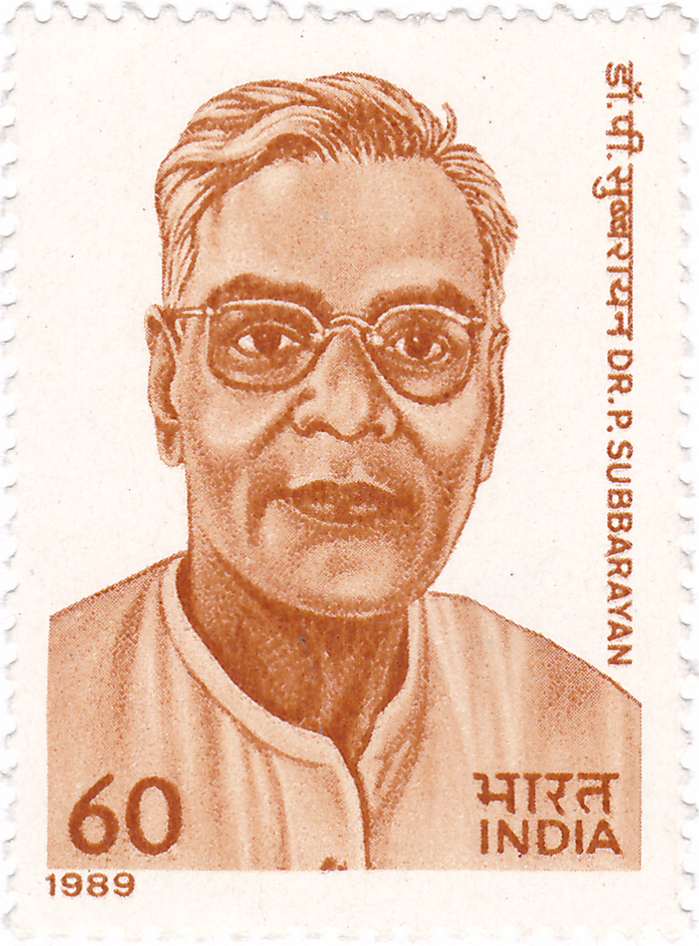
	First party	Second party
Leader	P. Munuswamy Naidu	P. Subbarayan
Party	Justice Party	Independent Nationalist Party
Seats won	35	9
Seat change	▲14	▲9
Percentage	35.71%	9.18%
Swing	▲14.29%	new party
First Minister before election
P. Subbarayan
Nonpartisan
Elected First Minister
P. Munuswamy Naidu
Justice Party

The fourth legislative council election to Madras Presidency after the establishment of dyarchical system of government by the Government of India Act, 1919 in September 1930. Justice party won the election and P. Munuswamy Naidu became the First Minister. The main opposition party - Swaraj Party did not contest the elections due to its participation in the Civil Disobedience Movement.

== Background ==
The election was held amid the severe world economic depression. Justice party decided to open its doors for Brahmans after a resolution made in the executive committee meeting held on 15 June 1930. Congress decided to boycott the election again in a meeting held in Lahore in 1929. 17 of its council members including Sathyamurthy, resigned their membership. Though the Congress did not participate in the election, it allowed its individual members like Swami Venkatachalam Chettiar and R. K. Shanmugam Chettiar to contest as Independents. Therefore, the contest was solely between the Justice Party and what was called Independent Nationalist party (former ministerialists) headed by P. Subbarayan. Justice party's leader, Raja of Panagal had died on 16 December 1928 and it was led by B. Munuswamy Naidu. It had a tumultuous relationship with Subbarayan's Independent Nationalists - cooperating in some issues and openly quarreling on some other.

== Constituencies ==
The Madras Legislative Council had a total of 132 members in addition to the ex officio members of the Governor's Executive Council. Out of the 132, 98 were elected from 61 constituencies of the presidency. The constituencies comprised three arbitrary divisions - 1)communal constituencies such as non-Muhammadan urban, non-Muhammadan rural, non-Brahman urban, Mohamaddan urban, Mohamaddan rural, Indian Christian, European and Anglo-Indian 2)special constituencies such as landholders, Universities, planters and trade associations (South India Chamber of Commerce & Nattukottai Nagarathar Association) and 3) territorial constituencies. 28 of the constituencies were reserved for non-Brahmans. 29 members were nominated, out of whom a maximum of 19 would be government officials, 5 would represent women, 5 would represent the Paraiyar, Pallar, Valluvar, Mala, Madiga, Sakkiliar, Thottiyar, Cheruman and Holeya communities and 1 would represent the "backward tracts". Including the Executive Council members, the total strength of the legislature was 134.

== Results ==
About 43% of the electorate comprising about 4% of the Presidency's population voted in the election. (The franchise was limited based on property qualifications.) Justice party won 35 seats out of the 45 it contested in the election. Independent Nationalist party and Liberals together won less 10 seats. Most of the other seats were won by independents. 35 of the 98 elective seats were won without any contest.

== Government formation ==
The Governor of Madras, George Frederick Stanley, nominated 32 non-elected members including officials immediately after the election and invited the Justice Party form the Government. B. Ramachandra Reddy was elected as the President of the council. On 27 October 1930, B. Munuswami Naidu took charge as First Minister. P. T. Rajan and S. Kumaraswami Reddiar became the other two members of the Justice ministry. P. Subbarayan, former First Minister became opposition leader. Soon after Munuswamy Naidu formed the government, the Justice Party was torn apart by factionalism. The Zamindars who had supported the Justice Party were disgruntled at the fact that two of the foremost landlords of the Presidency, the Raja of Bobbili and the Kumara Raja of Venkatagiri had not been included in the Cabinet. In November 1930, the disgruntled Zamindars formed a faction "ginger group" under the leadership of M. A. Muthiah Chettiar. This faction succeeded in forcing Naidu's resignation as Party leader and as First Minister. On 5 November 1932, the Raja of Bobbili took over as First Minister.

== Impact ==
This was the last election won by the Justice party. Intra party factionalism, unpopular policies, resurgence of the Congress with rising nationalism among the people all combined to ensure that it would never win another election during its existence. The party was split between the Zamindari and the non-Zamindari factions which struggled for power. The Zamindari faction eventually won and its leader the Raja of Bobbili became the First Minister. His pro-land owner economic policies amidst the Great Depression were hugely unpopular and contributed to the party's defeat in the 1934 and 1937 elections.
