= Madras Presidency Association =

Madras Presidency Association was a faction within the Indian National Congress which existed before indian independence. While Justice Party championed the cause of non-Brahmins in Madras presidency, non-Brahmins within the Congress party founded the MPA (Madras Presidency Association)

== Formation ==
It was established on 20 September 1917 at a meeting of non-Brahmin Congress leaders in Chennai. Prominent leaders of the association were Periyar E. V. Ramasamy, V. Kalyanasundaram, P. Varadarajulu Naidu and Gooty Kesava Pillai. Kesava Pillai was the MPA's president and E. V. Ramasamy one of the vice presidents. The MPA briefly published two journals - Indian Patriot in English and Deshabhaktan in Tamil.

== Dissolution ==
After the Government of India Act 1919 was passed, the MPA slowly disintegrated. Frustrated by the hostility of Brahmin Congress leaders' opposition to the MPA's demand of reservation of seats for non-Brahmins in the legislatures, Kesava Pillai resigned from the Congress and joined the Justice party.
