= 1934 Madras Presidency Legislative Council election =

1934 Madras Presidency legislative council election
- November 1934

98 seats in Madras Legislative Council 50 seats needed for a majority
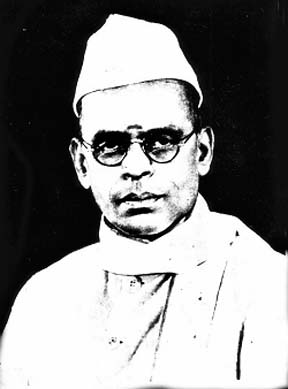

| | First party | Second party |
|---|---|---|
| Leader | Sathyamurthy | Raja of Bobbili |
| Party | SP | Justice Party |
| Seats won | 29 | 28 |
| Seat change | ▲29 | ▼7 |
| Percentage | 29.59% | 28.57% |
| Swing | ▲29.59% | ▼7.14% |
First Minister before election
Raja of Bobbili
Justice Party
Elected First Minister
Raja of Bobbili
Justice Party

In the fifth legislative council election to Madras Presidency after the establishment of dyarchical system of government by the Government of India Act, 1919 the ruling Justice party lost the election and the opposition Swaraj Party emerged as the single largest party. However, it refused to form the government, due to its opposition to dyarchy. The incumbent First Minister, Raja of Bobbili retained power and formed a minority government.

== Background ==
By 1933, constitutional reforms were imminent and dyarchy was expected to be abolished. The fourth council's term, which was to have ended on 5 November 1933, was extended by a year because it was believed a new council would not serve out its full term before dyarchy was abolished. But, after a year, the expected reforms had not materialized and fresh elections were held for a new council. The Justice party was split between the Zamindari and the non-Zamindari factions which struggled for power. The Zamindari faction eventually won and its leader, the Raja of Bobbili, became the First Minister in November 1932 replacing P. Munuswamy Naidu. His pro-land owner economic policies amidst the Great Depression were hugely unpopular. The Indian National Congress and its electoral arm, the Swaraj Party decided to participate in the elections despite their opposition to dyarchy. The Congress was greatly rejuvenated by its successful organisation of the Salt Satyagraha and Civil Disobedience movement of 1930-31. The Civil Disobedience movement, the Land Tax reduction agitations and Union organizations helped the Congress to mobilize popular opposition to the Bobbili Raja government. In contrast, the faction ridden Justice party had to dilute its main plank of anti-Brahminism and allow Brahmins to become members.

== Constituencies ==
The Madras Legislative Council had a total of 132 members in addition to the ex - officio members of the Governor's Executive Council. Out of the 132, 98 were elected from 61 constituencies of the presidency. The constituencies comprised three arbitrary divisions - 1) communal constituencies such as non-Muhammadan urban, non-Muhammadan rural, non-Brahman urban, Mohamaddan urban, Mohamaddan rural, Indian Christian, European and Anglo-Indian 2) special constituencies such as landholders, Universities, planters and trade associations (South India Chamber of Commerce & Nattukottai Nagarathar Association) and 3) territorial constituencies. 28 of the constituencies were reserved for non-Brahmans. 34 members were nominated, of whom a maximum of 19 would be government officials, 5 would represent women, 5 would represent the Paraiyar, Pallar, Valluvar, Mala, Madiga, Sakkiliar, Thottiyar, Cheruman and Holeya communities and 1 would represent the "backward tracts". Including the Executive Council members, the total strength of the legislature was 134. The franchise was limited based on property qualifications.

== Results ==
The Justice party lost the election and the Swarajists emerged as the single largest party with 29 seats.

== Government formation ==
The Swarajists refused to assume power due to their opposition to dyarchy. The Raja of Bobbili retained power by forming a minority government. Justice Party leaders R. K. Shanmukham Chetty and Arcot Ramasamy Mudaliar had lost their seats as the chief whip of the party M. A. Muthiah Chettiar withdrew his support for their candidature. Bobbili retaliated by dismissing him as the party whip. Chettiar responded by filing a no-confidence motion against the minority government. To appease him Bobbili replaced S. Kumaraswami Reddiar with Chettiar as the minister for Education. To appease other factions, he created a new ministry of home affairs and appointed Mohammad Usman and later A. T. Pannirselvam as its ministers.

== See also ==
- Raja of Bobbili
