= 1923 Madras Presidency Legislative Council election =

1923 Madras Presidency legislative council election
- 31 October – 10 November 1923

98 seats in Madras Legislative Council 50 seats needed for a majority
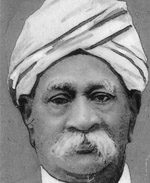

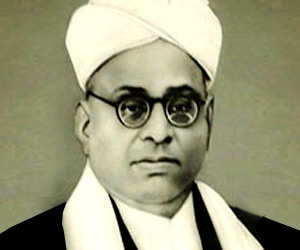
	First party	Second party	Third party
Leader	Sir P. Theagaroya Chetty	C. R. Reddy	S. Srinivasa Iyengar
Party	Justice Party	Anti-Ministerialists	SP
Seats won	44	37	11
Seat change	▼19	▲37	▲11
Percentage	44.90%	37.76%	11.22%
Swing	▼19.39%	new party	new party
First Minister before election
Panagal Raja
Justice Party
Elected First Minister
Panagal Raja
Justice Party

The second legislative council election to Madras Presidency after the establishment of diarchical system of government by the Government of India Act, 1919 was held in 1923. Voter turnout was higher than the previous election. Swarajists, a breakaway group from Indian National Congress participated in the election. The ruling Justice Party had suffered a split, when a splinter group calling themselves anti-Ministerialists left the party. It won the highest number of seats but fell short of a majority. Nevertheless, Madras Governor Willington invited it to form the government. Incumbent Justice First Minister Panagal Raja was nominated by Party leader Theagaraya Chetty to continue as First Minister for a second term. The government survived a no-confidence motion (with the support of non-elected members), brought against it on the first day of its tenure by the opposition headed by C. R. Reddy.

== Background ==
=== Split in Justice Party ===
Constant infighting within the Justice Party led to the creation of a group calling themselves anti-ministerialists. This group included notable members like C. Natesa Mudaliar, T. A. Ramalingam Chettiar, C. R. Reddy and P. Subbarayan. They challenged Theagaroya Chetty's leadership alleging that he was exercising autocratic control over the party. Chetty's support for British oppression of the Non-cooperation movement was disapproved by members of his party including Subbaroyan and R. K. Shanmugam Chettiar. Inclusion of no Tamil members by Theagaroya Chetty in the ministry caused resentment among Tamil members. Members of the previous ministry Raja of Panagal and Kurma Venkata Reddy Naidu were Telugu members and A. P. Patro was from Orissa. Theagaroya Chetty also had Telugu ancestry.

=== Birth of Swarajists ===
The years after the 1920 election witnessed major developments at the national level. Gandhi and his followers including C. Rajagopalachari strongly believed in Congress not participating in the elections. However, Chittaranjan Das (C. R. Das), Motilal Nehru and few others encouraged Congress participation in election. The party passed a resolution on 7 September 1922 to allow its members to stand as candidates and participate in the elections. C. R. Das's attempt to move a resolution advocating active participation in elections, at the Congress meeting held in Gaya in December 1922 after the imprisonment of Gandhi failed. Soon afterwards, C. R. Das and his followers formed Swaraj Party on 1 January 1923. Their platform included fighting the elections and participating in the elections and continue non-cooperation from within the diarchy. However, they did not secede from Congress and remained as a Pressure group within the Congress. After much debate between the pro- and anti-Council entry members within the Congress, a special meeting held in late September 1923 in Delhi authorised willing Congressmen to participate in elections while reinstating its commitment to non-cooperation. Rajagopalachari who did not attend the meeting expressed his support for Council entry. Despite his national support for Council entry, he continued working against it in Tamil Nadu. After Gandhi was released from Jail in February 1924, he was willing to accommodate the Swarajists in the Congress fold while expressing dislike for Council entry. He advised Rajaji also to follow a similar course in Madras and it was not until 1925 Rajaji publicly accepted Gandhi's advice. S. Srinivasa Iyengar joined the Swarajists and became the leader of the party machinery for the Madras Presidency.

== Constituencies ==
The Madras Legislative Council had a total of 127 members in addition to the ex–officio members of the Governor's Executive Council. Out of the 127, 98 were elected from 61 constituencies of the presidency. The constituencies comprised three arbitrary divisions:

- communal constituencies such as non-Muhammadan urban, non-Muhammadan rural, non-Brahman urban, Mohamaddan urban, Mohamaddan rural, Indian Christian, European and Anglo-Indian
- special constituencies such as landholders, Universities, planters and trade associations (South India Chamber of Commerce & Nattukottai Nagarathar Association)
- territorial constituencies

28 of the constituencies were reserved for non-Brahmans. 29 members were nominated, out of whom a maximum of 19 would be government officials, 5 would represent the Paraiyar, Pallar, Valluvar, Mala, Madiga, Sakkiliar, Thottiyar, Cheruman and Holeya communities and 1 would represent the "backward tracts". Including the Executive Council members, the total strength of the legislature was 134.

== Polling ==
The term of the first council expired on 11 September 1923. Elections for the second council were held on 31 October. Heavy rains and the resulting flooding in some areas delayed the completion of polling till 10 November. Elections for held for only 44 constituencies. From the remaining 17 constituencies, 20 members were elected unopposed. The franchise was limited based on property qualifications. More people cast their votes in this election than the first one. 28% polling was recorded in North Arcot rural constituency, 58.8% in Madras city and 77% in Tirunelveli-Palayamcotai urban constituency. Over all the presidency witnessed a 36.2% turnout.

== Results ==
The Justice Party emerged as the single largest party but was not able to obtain a simple majority. The Swarajists contested 11 seats and they won all of them. The following table shows the party wise distribution of elected and non elected members.

Party	Elected	Nominated and ex officio	Total
Justice Party	44	0	44
Swaraj Party	11	0	11
Independents	6	1	7
Anti-ministerial	37	0	37
Officials	0	11	11
Non-Officials	0	17	17
Total	98	29	127

== Analysis ==
The following table shows communal distribution of the elected and non-elected members.

Party	Elected	Nominated and ex officio	Total
Brahmans	13	1	14
non-Brahmans	61	8	69
Depressed classes	0	9	9
Mohammadans	13	1	14
Indian Christians	5	2	7
Europeans and Anglo-Indians	6	8	14
Total	98	29	127

The poor performance of Justice party has been attributed to four reasons – 1) Internal dissent in the party weakened it. Members like Natesa Mudaliar, M. C. Rajah and O. Kandasamy Chettiar were openly critical of the party's functioning during the first council. 2) The exclusion of Tamils from the first ministry weakened it in the Southern Tamil speaking districts of the presidency. 3) The Swarajists emerged as a small yet significant opposition to the Justice party. 4) Lack of an effective campaign hobbled the party's performance in the polls.

== Government formation ==
After the elections, Madras Governor Willington called upon the Justice Party to form the Government. Theagaraya Chetty recommended two former ministers Raja of Panagal (as First Minister) and A. P. Patro to be included in the cabinet. Kurma Venkata Reddy Naidu, the minister for Development was dropped and instead T. N. Sivagnanam Pillai, a Tamil member was inducted in the ministry. The ministers assumed office on 19 November 1923. Abdullah Ghatala Sabib Bahadur, S. Arpudasami Udayar and T. C. Thangavelu Pillai were appointed as Council secretaries. The new executive council of the Governor consisted of C. G. Todhunter, A. R. Knapp, C. P. Ramaswami Iyer and Vasudeva Ravi Varma Valiya Raja . L. D. Swamikannu Pillai was appointed by the Governor as the President of the legislative council for one year and his successor was to be chosen by the council itself after the end of his term. The council lasted from 26 November 1923, till 7 November 1926.

=== No-confidence motion ===
Though Justice Party won the highest number of seats, it was still of short of a majority. Therefore, a no-confidence motion was moved on the first day (27 November 1923) of the council questioning the legitimacy of its Government. It was the first such motion in Indian legislative history. The motion was filed by anti-Ministerialists who had organized themselves as the United Nationalist Party (UNP). C. R. Reddy, who moved the motion, said in his statement that he did not question the authority of the Governor, but the legitimacy of the Justice Party government. He had two main arguments – 1) The election results showed that the electorate was against the government, and 2) The Raja of Panagal showed nepotism in choosing the Presidents of various local governmental bodies. The government was defended in the legislature by the Raja of Panagal and A. P. Patro. S. Satyamurti (later leader of the Swaraj party) made his maiden speech in the assembly in support of the motion. The motion was discussed for two days and put to vote on 28 November. The government survived with the support of nominated members. 65 members including 21 non elected members opposed the motion, while 43 supported it and 10 (including Venkata Reddy Naidu) remained neutral. Members who supported the motion and voted against the government included members of the UNP, Swarajists, all independents and non official Muslim members. Members who opposed the motion and voted for the government included 44 members of the Justice party, 13 nominated and 8 ex officio members. The nationalist newspaper, The Hindu which had opposed the Justice Party from its inception contended

If the official and nominated members are excluded, the figures reduce themselves to 44 votes cast for the ministers and 43 votes against it. Looked at from the angle of electorate at large, the 44 votes represented elected of 192,855 as against the 43 representing 257,144. So, it is exceedingly clear that the electorate at large has given its verdict against the Ministers.

== Impact ==
The second Justice government ushered in by the 1923 elections continued and expanded the policies and legislative initiatives of the first Justice government of 1920–23. The Hindu Religious Endowment bill, which had been first introduced on 18 December 1922, was finally passed in 1925. This effectively brought a majority of the Hindu temples in the presidency under the control of the provincial government. This Act set the precedent to for several later Hindu Religious and Charitable Endowment (HR & CE) Acts and the current policy of the state of Tamil Nadu.
