= C. Natesa Mudaliar =

Indian politician and activist (1875–1937)

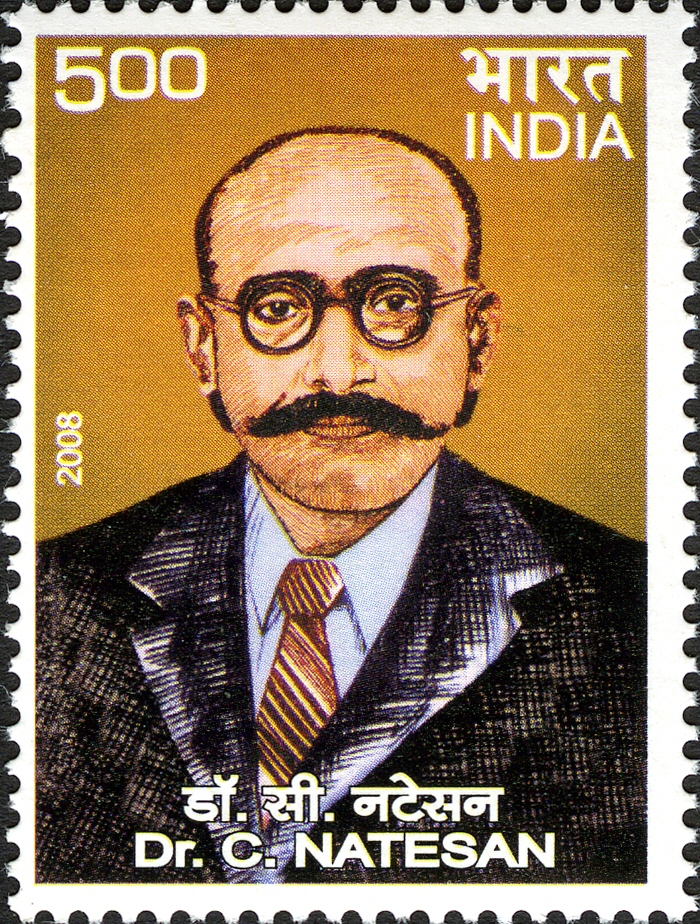
- Natesa Mudaliar on a 2008 stamp of India
- Born: 1875; Triplicane, Madras, Madras Presidency, British India
- Died: 1937 (aged 61–62); Madras, Madras Presidency, British India
- Education: Presidency College, Madras
- Occupation: politician
- Political party: Justice Party

C. Natesa Mudaliar (1875–1937), also known as C. Natesan, was an Indian politician and activist of the Dravidian Movement from what became the Indian state of Tamil Nadu. He was one of the founders of the Justice Party, along with P. Theagaraya Chetty and T. M. Nair.

Mudaliar was born in Triplicane, Madras, in 1875. His early schooling was in Madras, following which he graduated from Presidency College and Madras Medical College before practising as a doctor.

Mudaliar founded the Madras United League in 1912 and was one of the founders of the South Indian Liberal Federation. He was elected to the Madras Legislative Council in 1923 as a candidate of the Justice Party and served as a legislator until 1937, when he died at the age of 62.

== Early life ==
Natesa Mudaliar was born in Triplicane, Madras in 1875. He belongs to Thuluva Vellalar community. He had his early schooling in Madras and graduated in arts from the University of Madras. He worked as a lecturer in Pithapuram Maharaja College and as an interpreter in the Gordon Woodrof Company. He graduated in medicine from Madras Medical College and practiced as a doctor. In 1922, he was made a member of the First Selection committee for admission to Madras Medical College.

== Personal life ==
Natesa Mudaliar brought in two non-Brahmin priests from Coimbatore and celebrated his daughter's marriage without Brahmin priests as part of the Justice Party's ideology to do house rituals without the Brahmin priests.

== Contribution in early Dravidian politics ==
In 1912, the Madras United League was formed. Mudaliar was one of the founders of the league and served as its Secretary. The league was largely composed of government employees and concentrated on improving the literacy of non-Brahmins by conducting adult education classes. In November 1912, the Madras United League was renamed as the Madras Dravidian Association and Panaganti Ramarayaningar, later the Raja of Panagal was elected president.

In 1914, while still a medical student in Madras, Natesa Mudaliar established "The Dravidian Home," a hostel for non-Brahmin students. Mudaliar had discovered that caste restrictions prevented non-Brahmins from finding hostel lodging in Madras. In the 2 years that the Home was operational, Mudaliar founded the Dravidian Association with the aim of enhancing non-Brahmin political authority through "Dravidian Upliftment."

== Formation of the South Indian Liberal Federation ==
Through the mediatory efforts of Mudaliar, political opponents Theagaroya Chetty and T. M. Nair came together and resolved to put forth their efforts to form an organization representing the non-Brahmins of the Madras Presidency.

In November 1916, at a non-Brahmin conference presided over by Panaganti Ramarayaningar, the four important non-Brahmin organizations in the Presidency came together to form the South Indian Liberal Federation, more popularly known as the Justice Party. Theagaroya Chetty became the first President of the federation.

Mudaliar, along with Chetty, was instrumental in negotiating an end to the Buckingham and Carnatic Mills strike of 1921, organized by V. Kalyanasundaram.

== In the Legislative Council ==
Mudaliar did not participate in the first general elections in Madras Presidency held in 1920. However, in the 1923 assembly elections, he was elected to the Madras Legislative Council. He had differences with ministers in the Raja of Panagal ministry and often criticized the government. When P. Subbarayan took over as Chief Minister, Mudaliar praised Subbarayan and the Swarajya Arty and appealed for the merger of the Justice Party with the Indian National Congress. At the Non-Brahmin confederation in Coimbatore in 1927, he led the split of the Justice Party into two camps: Ministerialists and Constitutionalists and functioned as the leader of the Constitutionalists until the two groups merged. In 1929, Mudaliar presided over the Justice Party conference in which a resolution was passed facilitating the admission of Brahmins in the party.

In 1933, Mudaliar expressed his support to C. P. Ramaswami Iyer when the latter spoke against casteism and proposed a temple entry law in order to remove restrictions on scheduled castes entering Hindu temples.

== Death ==
Natesan was expected to contest in the 1937 elections to the legislative assembly of Madras but he died suddenly in February 1937 at the age of 62.

== See also ==
- Rattamalai Srinivasan
- C. Iyothee Thass
- Maraimalai Adigal
- Justice Party
