= 1920 Madras Presidency Legislative Council election =

1920 Madras Presidency legislative council election
- November 1920

98 seats in Madras Legislative Council 50 seats needed for a majority
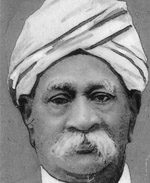
	First party	Second party
Leader	P. Theagaroya Chetty
Party	Justice Party	Independent
Seats won	63	18
Percentage	64.29%	18.37%
Elected First Minister
A. Subbarayalu Reddiar
Justice Party

The first legislative council election to Madras Presidency after the establishment of dyarchical system of government by the Government of India Act 1919, was held in November 1920. Indian National Congress boycotted the election due to its participation in the Non-cooperation movement. The election occurred during the early stages of non-Brahmin movement and the major issue of the election was anti-Brahminism. Justice party won the election with no significant opposition and A. Subbarayalu Reddiar became the inaugural First Minister of the Madras Presidency.

== Government of India Act 1919 ==
Based on the recommendations of the Montagu-Chelmsford report, the Government of India Act 1919 was enacted. The act enlarged the provincial legislative councils and increased the number of elected members more than nominated members and company officials. It introduced a system of dyarchy in the Provinces. Although this act brought about representative government in India, the governor was empowered with overriding powers. It classified the subjects as belonging to either the Centre or the Provinces. The Governor General could override any law passed by the provincial councils. It brought about the concept of "Partial Responsible Government" in the provinces. Provincial subjects were divided into two categories - reserved and transferred. Education, Sanitation, Local self-government, Agriculture and Industries were listed as the transferred subjects. Law, finance, revenue and home affairs were the reserved subjects. The provincial council could decide the budget in so far it related to the transferred subjects. Executive machinery dealing with those subjects was placed under the direct control of provincial legislature. However, the provincial legislature and the ministers did not have any control over the reserved subjects, which came under the governor and his executive council. It introduced for the first time bicameralism and direct elections in the country. Thus the Indian legislative council was replaced by the bicameral legislature consisting of an Upper House (Council of State) and a Lower House (Legislative Assembly).

== Constituencies ==
The Madras Legislative Council had a total of 127 members in addition to the ex - officio members of the Governor's Executive Council. Out of the 127, 98 were elected from 61 constituencies of the presidency. The constituencies comprised three arbitrary divisions - 1)communal constituencies such as non-Muhammadan urban, non-Muhammadan rural, non-Brahman urban, Mohamaddan urban, Mohamaddan rural, Indian Christian, European and Anglo-Indian 2)special constituencies such as landholders, Universities, planters and trade associations (South India Chamber of Commerce & Nattukottai Nagarathar Association) and 3) territorial constituencies. 28 of the constituencies were reserved for non-Brahmans. 29 members were nominated, out of whom a maximum of 19 would be government officials, 5 would represent the Paraiyar, Pallar, Valluvar, Mala, Madiga, Sakkiliar, Thottiyar, Cheruman and Holeya communities and 1 would represent the "backward tracts". Including the Executive Council members, the total strength of the legislature was 134.

== Electorate and polling ==
The first general election was held during November 1920. At the time of the election, Madras presidency had a population of 40 million people. The franchise was limited based on property qualifications. 1,248,156 persons were eligible to vote, among whom 303,558 actually cast their votes. The Indian National Congress boycotted the election due to its participation in the Non-cooperation movement. The Hindu reported that polling was as low as 12% in some constituencies and no constituencies reported polling higher than 25%. The city of Madras reported the highest turnout with 52% polling and Mylapore, a traditionally Brahmin area had an even higher turnout. The turnout was varied in rural areas, impacted by rain and flooding. The average turnout was 24.9% all over the Presidency. The Madras Mail reported that the turnout was low compared to elections for British parliament, but nonetheless, an impressive demonstration of growth of political consciousness.

== Results ==
In the absence of significant opposition, the Justice party was able to win 63 seats. Party wise distribution of elected and non elected members:

Party	Elected	Nominated and ex officio	Total
Justice Party	63	0	63
Indian National Congress	Did not contest	Did not contest	Did not contest
Independent (politician)	18	0	18
Anti-ministerial	17	0	17
Officials	0	11	11
Non-Officials	0	18	18
Total	98	29	127

The Justice party claimed the support of 18 non elected members bringing up its strength to 81 in the council.

== Analysis ==
The following table shows communal distribution of the elected and non-elected members.

Party	Elected	Nominated and ex officio	Total
Brahmans	17	5	22
non-Brahmans	57	8	65
Depressed classes	0	5	5
Mohammadans	13	1	14
Indian Christians	5	1	6
Europeans and Anglo-Indians	6	9	15
Total	98	29	127

According to P. Rajaraman, the victory of the Justice party can be attributed to three factors - the election boycott of the Congress, which left the Justice party without any serious opponent, the vigorous campaign of Justice leaders and reservation of seats to non-brahman members.

== Government formation ==
At first, Governor Willingdon invited the wealthy P. Theagaroya Chetty, the leader of the justice party to form the government. He refused the offer as he did not like to be paid a salary from people's taxes. He recommended that A. Subbarayalu Reddiar, Ramarayaningar (Raja of Panagal) and Kurma Venkata Reddy Naidu, all Telugu members, be made ministers. Reddiar was appointed as the First Minister and as the minister in charge of Education, Public works, Excise & Registration. Ramarayaningar became the minister of local self-government & Public health, while Venkata Reddy Naidu was given the Development portfolio. The ministers assumed office on 17 December 1920. Perungavur Rajagopalachari was appointed as the President of the legislative council and Edwin Periyanayakam, Arcot Ramasamy Mudaliar & P. Subbarayan were made council secretaries. C. P. Ramaswami Iyer was appointed as the Advocate General. The Governor's Executive Council consisted of Sir Lionel Davidson (member for Home), Sir Charles Todhunter (Finance), Muhammad Habibullah (Revenue) and S. Srinivasa Iyengar (Law). On 11 July 1921, Raja of Panagal took over as Premier when Subbarayalu Reddiar resigned on health grounds and A. P. Patro, an Orissa lawyer was appointed as the minister of Education. The council was dissolved at the end of its term on 11 September 1923.

== Impact ==
The Justice party which came into existence in 1916 was able to capture power on social development and non-Brahmin platform. It would go on to rule Madras till the 1937 elections (with an interlude during 1926–30). Noting the significance of its victory, the Official review of the Government of India (1921–22) said:

For the first time in the history of India, the lower castes of Madras have asserted themselves against the intellectual oligarchy of the upper caste and have seized political power in their own hands...The first bulwark of caste dominance in political matters has been stormed as a result of the recent constitutional changes

Some of the legislative initiatives of the first Justice Government have had a lasting impact and are still in practice in one form or another. On 16 September 1921, the Justice government passed the first communal government order (G. O. # 613), thereby becoming the first elected body in the Indian legislative history to legislate reservations, which have since become standard policy in India. Similarly, the Madras Hindu Religious Endowment Act, introduced on 18 December 1922, brought many of the Hindu Temples under the direct control of the state government. This Act, which was eventually passed by the second Justice Government in 1925, set the precedent for several later Hindu Religious and Charitable Endowment (HR & CE) Acts and the current policy of the state of Tamil Nadu.

The Government of India Act of 1919 had restricted women from becoming legislators. The first Justice Government reversed this policy by moving a resolution in the council on 1 April 1921. The qualifications for becoming a member of the council were made gender neutral. This resolution cleared the way for Dr. Muthulakshmi Reddi's nomination to the council in 1926, when she became the first woman to become a member of any legislature in India. The Mid-day Meal Scheme, was first introduced in 1920 by the Madras Corporation with the approval of the legislative council, as a breakfast scheme in a corporation school at Thousand Lights, Madras. Later it was expanded to four more schools. This was the precursor to the free noon meal schemes introduced by K. Kamaraj in 1960's and expanded by M. G. Ramachandran in the 1980s.
