= T. M. Nair =

Indian politician and activist (1868–1919)

Taravath Madhavan Nair
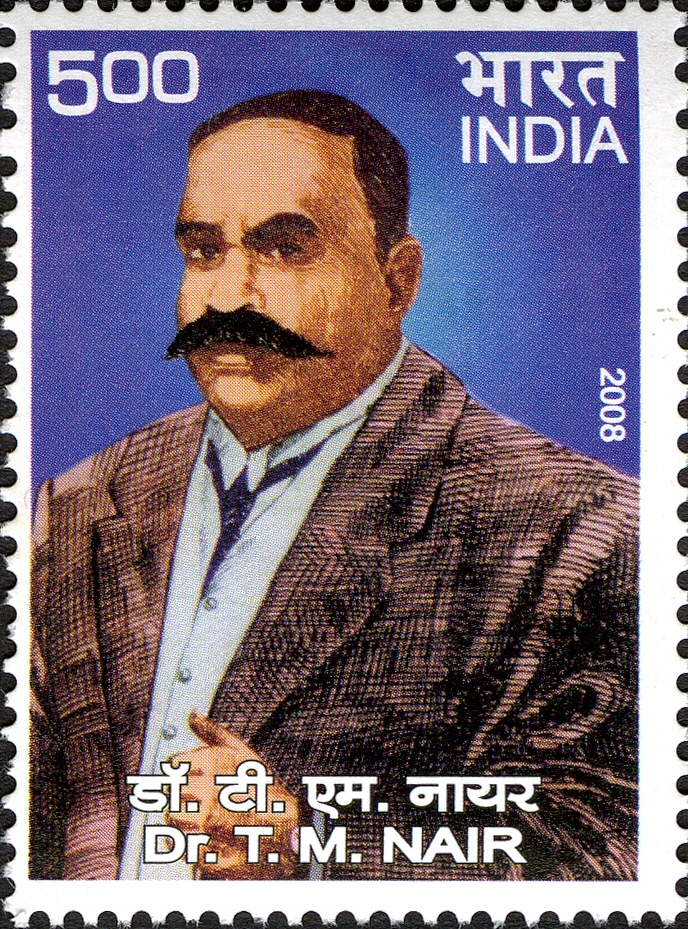
- Born: 15 January 1868; Tirur, Malabar District, Madras Presidency, British India (now Malappuram district, Kerala, India)
- Died: 17 July 1919 (aged 51); London, England
- Occupations: Politician; Physician

Taravath Madhavan Nair (15 January 1868 – 17 July 1919) was an Indian politician and political activist of the Dravidian Movement from the Madras Presidency. He founded the Justice Party along with Theagaraya Chetty and C. Natesa Mudaliar.

== Early life ==
Nair was born in Tirur, Malabar District (in present day Ponnani taluk, Malappuram district, Kerala, India) on 15 January 1868. He belongs to an affluent Kiriyathil-Charna Nair subcaste family of North Kerala. His father Chingicham Veetil Sankaran Nair was a District Munsiff in the Judicial service at Tirur. Madhavan Nair's elder brother Sankaran Nair studied law and served as Deputy Collector while his sister Taravath Ammalu Amma was a Sanskrit and Malayalam scholar who wrote a book in Malayalam on the lives of the 63 Nayanmars.

Nair was educated at the Government High School, Palghat. He was known for his academic proficiency and he passed his matriculation exam one year in advance. He graduated from the Presidency College, Madras and joined Madras Medical College. However, he did not complete his course in medicine moving to continues his studies at the University of Edinburgh. He graduated from the University with an in MBChB, and obtained his MD in 1896, with Sanskrit as the compulsory classical subject. He researched in ENT diseases at Paris and returned to India in 1897. During his stay in the United Kingdom, he was a member of the Edinburgh Student's Representative Council, Secretary and later, President of the Edinburgh Indian Association, member of the Edinburgh University Liberal Association and University Union and one of the editors of Edinburgh University Liberal's magazine "The Student". Prior to his return to India, Nair spent some time in London where he served as Secretary and later Vice-President of London Indian Society which was led by Dadabhai Naoroji. He also served as a member of the British Medical Association, the Royal Asiatic Society, the National Liberal Club and the Royal Society.

== Public offices ==
Nair represented Triplicane in the Madras Corporation from 1904 to 1916. During his term he frequently attacked the Corporation and its President Molony over the quality of water supplied. In 1910 he agitated for the revival of the Palghat Municipal Council.

In 1908 Nair was appointed member of the Labor Commission by the Government of India. He submitted a report condemning the situation of workers in factories and recommended the reduction of hours of work. He personally submitted his condemnation and recommendations before the Secretary of State for India at London.

In 1912 Nair was elected to the Madras Legislative Council. When the First World War broke out Nair served as one of the surgeons on the hospital ship SS Madras, and was commissioned as a lieutenant. At the end of the war he was awarded the Kaiser-i-Hind medal and posthumously the War Service medal.

== In the Indian National Congress ==
Nair was associated with the Indian National Congress right from the time of his return to India in 1897. In the Congress sessions in 1898 and 1899, he strongly condemned the present status of Indian officers in the Medical services and campaigned for equal treatment to be meted out to them. He presided over the District Congress at Chittoor, North Arcot in 1907.

== Formation of the South Indian Liberal Federation ==
When Nair lost the elections to the Imperial Legislature of India held in 1916 he blamed caste-based prejudices in the Indian National Congress for his loss. Nair felt that the Brahmins were dominating the Indian National Congress. He protested the Home Rule Movement launched by Annie Besant.

In 1917 Nair left the Indian National Congress. At a meeting in August 1917 he said:

Non-Brahmins were looking to the British Government for protection, to hold scales evenly and to mete out Justice, but when they saw a movement progressing whose object was to undermine British influence and power in this country, they thought it their duty to rally round the British Government and to support them

In October 1917, Nair launched the South Indian Liberal Federation, also known as the Justice Party in collaboration with Sir Pitti Theagaroya Chetty.

== Editorship of the Justice ==
In November 1916 a meeting was held at Madras in which Sir P. Theagaroya Chetty and Nair participated. The meeting brought out a resolution mandating the establishment of a newspaper for voicing the aspirations of non-Brahmins. From 26 February 1917 onwards, the Justice began to be published. Nair was the chief editor until his death in 1919. In his newspaper he attacked his opponents in the Indian National Movement and supporters of the Home Rule Movement. Once when the Indian National Congress carried out agitations in Ernad Tirur and Valluvanad, he prophesied that "the Congress was smoking in a gunpowder magazine". His words proved to be true when the Moplah Rebellion broke out in the region in the year 1921.

== Mission to England and death ==
In 1918–19, despite warnings from fellow doctors not to travel abroad as his health was deteriorating, he led a mission to England to speak in support of communal representations before a Joint Parliamentary Committee. He remains one of the few Indians to have addressed a meeting of the members of the UK Parliament. However he was prohibited from speaking to the public on the orders of Edwin Samuel Montagu, the Secretary of State for India. Nair died on 17 July 1919 at the age of 51 due to heart seizure following diabetic gangrene and Bright's disease. His body was cremated at Golders Green, cemetery in London and is still a pilgrim's centre for many who admire him.

== Inclination ==
Nair always wore Western clothes and followed Western manners and customs. As a result, he was frequently criticised as an anglophile. However, at the same time, he displayed his love for his mother tongue Malayalam by speaking and writing in chaste Malayalam.

== Commemoration ==
In 2008, the Government of India released a postage stamp in his honour. Dr. Nair Road, an arterial road running through T. Nagar, Chennai connecting Pondy bazar and GN Chetty Road – is named after him, since he lived and practised medicine from there.
