= P. Varadarajulu Naidu =

Indian physician, politician, journalist

Perumal Varadarajulu Naidu
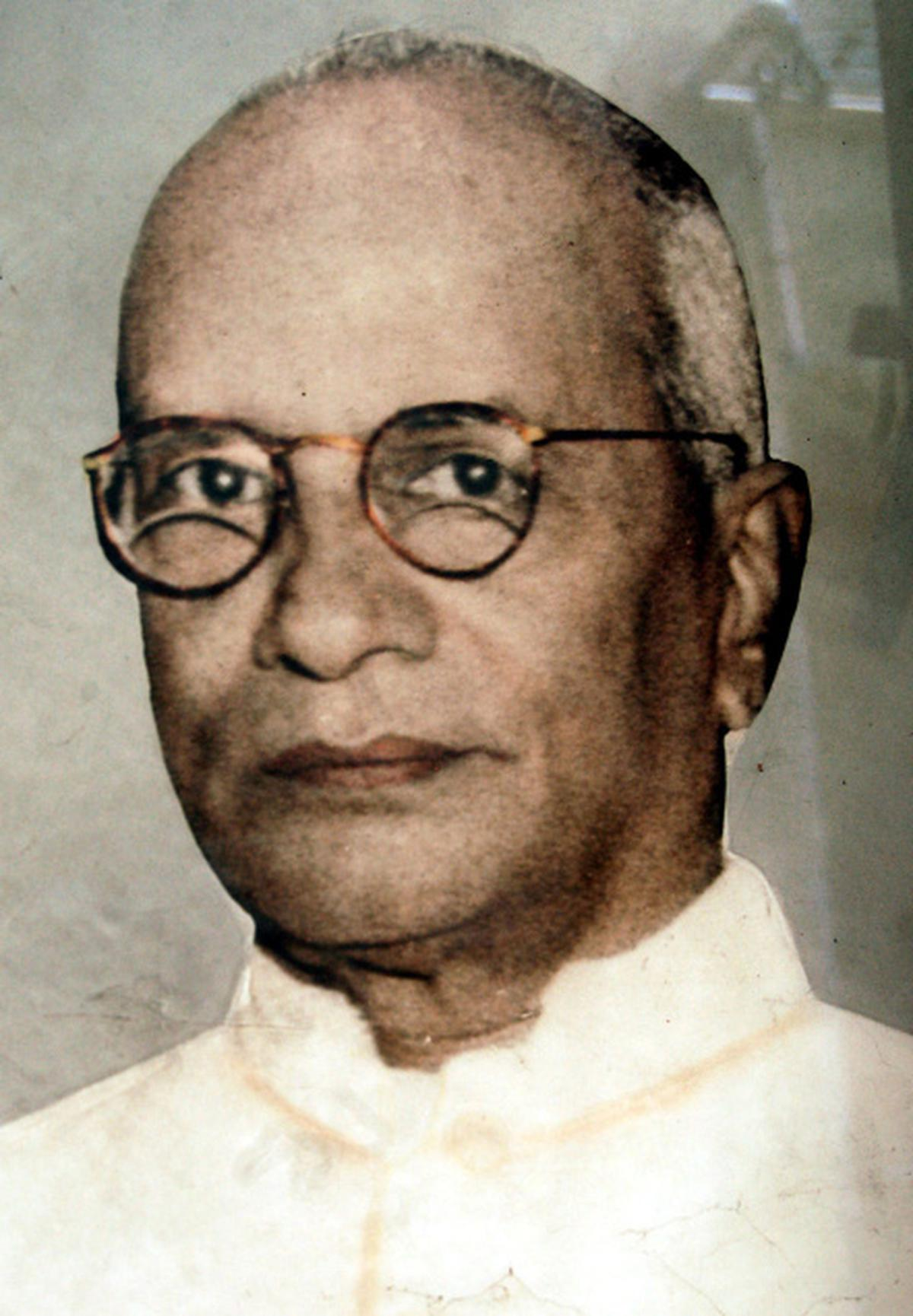

President, TNCC
- In office 1924 - 1926
- Preceded by: Periyar E. V. Ramasamy
- Succeeded by: Thiru. V. Kalyanasundaram

Personal details
- Born: 4 June 1887 Rasipuram, Madras Presidency, British India
- Died: 23 July 1957 (aged 70)
- Party: Indian National Congress
- Nickname: Tilak of South India

Perumal Varadarajulu Naidu (4 June 1887 – 23 July 1957) was an Indian physician, politician, journalist and Indian independence activist. He was also the founder of The Indian Express, a major English-language daily, in 1932 in Madras. He was described as, "a distinguished labour leader, an eminent journalist, an ardent champion of the causes of handloom weavers, small-scale and cottage industries and a spirited advocate of interests of politically and socially disadvantaged sections of society".

== Early life ==
Varadarajulu Naidu was born into a Telugu Balija Naidu family of Rasipuram near Salem on 4 June 1887. His father Perumal Naidu was a rich landlord. He had his early education in Madras and trained as an Ayurvedic physician.

== Politics ==
Varadarajulu Naidu entered politics at an early age and joined the Indian National Congress. In 1917, he gave up medical practice. He participated in the Indian Home Rule Movement and was President of the Tamil Nadu Congress Committee at the time of the Cheranmahadevi school controversy.

=== Cheranmadevi school controversy ===
Varadarajulu joined Periyar and Kalyanasundara Mudaliar and strongly opposed the practice of separate dining for Brahman and non-Brahman students in Shermadevi Gurukulam, a national school run by V. V. S. Aiyar. The issue was brought to the notice of Gandhi and Aiyar later resigned. When the Tamil Nadu Congress Committee met in April 1925 to discuss the issue, the recommendation of C. Rajagopalachari and Rajan that Congress should not interfere and that the school should instead be advised to eliminate the practice was swept aside. The resolution which prevented gradations of merit based on birth should not be observed by nationalist parties moved by Ramanathan passed. Rajagopalachari and six of his associates resigned from TNCC citing that caste prejudices could not be overcome by coercion. However, Varadarajulu Naidu stayed on in the Congress even as Periyar left the party.

=== Temple entry ===
In his later years, Varadarajulu Naidu actively participated in the temple-entry movements in Madras Presidency.

== Journalism ==
Varadarajulu started the weekly Tamil newspaper Tamil Nadu in 1925. In 1931, Varadarajulu Naidu started The Indian Express but had to sell off the newspaper within a year due to financial difficulties.

== Personal life ==
Naidu had three daughters and six sons. His eldest son, Krishnadas, died in June 2012. Three of his sons had served the Armed Forces. His son Balachandra was a World War 2 veteran, and spent more than 30 years as an officer in the Indian Army. His youngest son Dayanandan also retired in 1993 as a Colonel in the Indian Army. Naidu's son-in-law, K.L.K. Row, rose up to the level of Vice-Admiral in the Navy.
