= O. Thanikachalam Chetti =

Indian politician

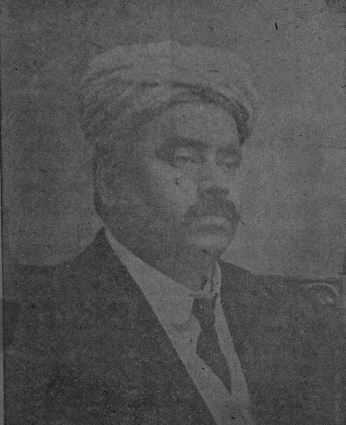
O. Thanikachalam Chettiar

Diwan Bahadur O. Thanikachalam Chettiar (December 1874 – 21 July 1929) was an Indian lawyer and politician who is considered to be one of the pioneers of the Dravidian Movement.

== Early life ==
Thanikachalam Chetti was born in December 1874 and educated at the Madras Christian College and Madras Law College. He worked as a lawyer with the Short, Bewes & Co Short, Bewes and Co later became Bewes and Thanikachalam, one of the first Indo-British collaborations. Thanikachalam Chetti participated in the early sessions of the Justice Party and was responsible for drafting the resolutions in the Madras Legislative Council which eventually became the Communal G. O. of 1928.

== B & C Mills Strike of 1921 ==
In 1921, there was a major strike by the factory workers at the Buckingham and Carnatic (B & C) Mills in Madras. When Dalit workers in the factory called off the strike and tried to negotiate with the police, the strike took a communal turn. Thanikachalam Chetti and the Raja of Panagal took the side of caste Hindu workers and strongly criticized the actions of the Dalit workers and police.
