= Diarchy in the Madras Presidency =

Diarchy was established in Madras Presidency based on the recommendations of the Montague-Chelmsford report. Five elections were held during the period diarchy was in effect and Justice Party occupied power most of the time. It ended with the election in 1937 when the Government of India Act 1935 came into effect.

== Government of India Act 1919 ==
The Government of India Act 1919 enlarged the provincial legislative councils and increased the strength of elected members to be greater than that of nominated and official members. It introduced a system of dyarchy in the provinces. Although this act brought about representative government in India, the governor was empowered with overriding powers. It classified the subjects as belonging to either the centre or the provinces. The governor general could override any law passed by the provincial councils. It brought about the concept of "Partial Responsible Government" in the provinces. Provincial subjects were divided into two categories – reserved and transferred. Education, sanitation, local self-government, agriculture and industries were listed as the transferred subjects. Law, finance, revenue and home affairs were the reserved subjects. The provincial council could decide the budget in so far it related to the transferred subjects. Executive machinery dealing with those subjects was placed under the direct control of provincial legislature. However, the provincial legislature and the ministers did not have any control over the reserved subjects, which came under the governor and his executive council.

== Council ==
The council had a total of 127 members in addition to the ex – officio members of the Governor's Executive Council. Out of the 127, 98 were elected from 61 constituencies of the presidency. The constituencies comprised three arbitrary divisions – 1)communal constituencies such as non-Muhammadan urban, non-Muhammadan rural, non-Brahman urban, Mohamaddan urban, Mohamaddan rural, Indian Christian, European and Anglo-Indian 2)special constituencies such as landholders, Universities, planters and trade associations (South India Chamber of Commerce & Nattukottai Nagarathar Association) and 3) territorial constituencies. 25 of the non-Mohammadan Rural and 3 of the non-Mohammadan Urban constituencies were reserved for non-Brahmans. 29 members were nominated, out of whom a maximum of 19 would be government officials, 5 would represent the Paraiyar, Pallar, Valluvar, Mala, Madiga, Sakkiliar, Thottiyar, Cheruman and Holeya communities and 1 would represent the "backward tracts". Including the Executive Council members, the total strength of the legislature was 134.

== Elections ==
=== 1920 election ===
The first legislative council election was held in November 1920. Indian National Congress boycotted the election due to its participation in the Non-cooperation movement. The election occurred during the early stages of non-Brahmin movement (later Self-Respect Movement) and the only major issue of the election was anti-Brahminism. Justice party won the election with no significant opposition and A. Subbarayalu Reddiar became the first Chief Minister of the presidency.

=== 1923 election ===
The second legislative council election was held in 1923. Voter turnout was higher than the previous election. Swarajists, a breakaway group from Indian National Congress participated in the election. The ruling Justice Party had suffered a split, when a splinter group calling themselves anti-Ministerialists left the party. It won the highest number of seats but fell short of a majority. Nevertheless, Madras Governor Willington invited it to form the government. Incumbent Justice chief minister Panagal Raja was nominated by party leader Theagaraya Chetty to continue as chief minister for a second term. The government survived a no-confidence motion (with the support of non-elected members), brought against it on the very first day of its tenure by the opposition headed by C. R. Reddy.

=== 1926 election ===
The third legislative council election was held in November 1926. Justice party lost the election to Swaraj Party. However, as the Swaraja Party refused to form the Government, the Governor of Madras set up an independent government under the leadership of P. Subbarayan and with the support of nominated members.

=== 1930 election ===
The fourth legislative council election was held in September 1930. Justice party won the election and P. Munuswamy Naidu became the first Chief Minister. The main opposition party – Swaraj Party did not contest the elections due to its participation in the Civil Disobedience Movement.

=== 1934 election ===
The fifth legislative council election was held in 1934. The ruling Justice party lost the election and the opposition Swaraj Party emerged as the single largest party. However it refused to form the government due to its opposition to dyarchy. The incumbent chief minister, Raja of Bobbili retained power and formed a minority government.
