= S. Kumaraswami Reddiar =

Indian lawyer and politician

Sir Subbarayalu Kumaraswami Reddiar

Minister of Education and Excise (Madras Presidency)
- In office 27 October 1930 – 10 October 1936
- Premier: B. Munuswamy Naidu, P. T. Rajan, Ramakrishna Ranga Rao of Bobbili
- Governor: George Frederick Stanley
- Preceded by: S. Muthiah Mudaliar
- Succeeded by: M. A. Muthiah Chettiar

Diwan Bahadur Sir Subbarayalu Kumaraswami Reddiar (23 April 1876 - after 1937) was an Indian lawyer and politician who served as a minister in Madras Presidency.

== Early life ==
Kumaraswami Reddiar was born in Tinnevely on 23 April 1876. He was educated at the Hindu College, Tinnevely and graduated from Presidency College, Madras. He studied law at Madras Law College and practised law. He served as Government Pleader and Public Prosecutor of Tinnevely till September 1926 before joining the Justice Party in the late 1920s.

== Politics ==
Kumaraswami Reddiar was elected to the Madras Legislative Council on a Justice Party ticket in 1930.

Kumaraswami Reddiar resigned his ministry post due to ill-health in 1936 and he was replaced with Muthiah Chettiar in a move to wipe out differences in the party. The resignation of P.T.Rajan and him lead to the step-down of B. Munuswamy Naidu from the position of Chief Minister and his subsequent succession by his rival Ramakrishna Ranga Rao, who was favoured by zamindars such as Muthiah Chettiar.

He was knighted in the 1937 Coronation Honours list.
