= Gooty Kesava Pillai =

Indian journalist, politician, and activist

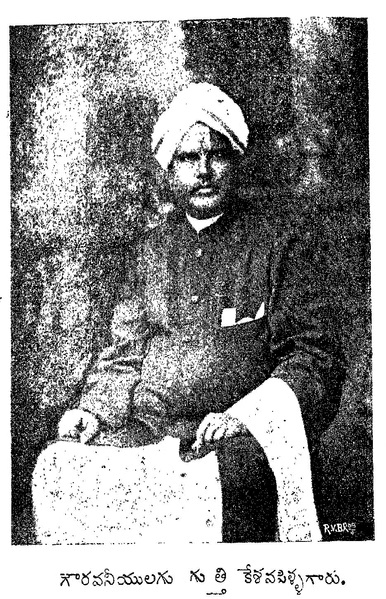

Diwan Bahadur Pattu Kesava Pillai (8 October 1860 – 28 March 1933) was an Indian journalist, politician and activist of the Indian Independence movement.

== Early life ==
Pattu Kesava Pillai was born in Pattu, North Arcot district, on 8 October 1860. He studied in Madras and began his career as a journalist for The Hindu. In 1883, at the age of 22, Kesava Pillai was appointed The Hindu's correspondent for Gooty. From then on, Kesava Pillai became known as "Gooty Kesava Pillai".

== Public life ==
Kesava Pillai was elected to Gooty municipality and served as a member of the municipality. He was also eventually elected to the Madras Legislative Council as representing Municipalities.

== Politics ==
Kesava Pillai was interested in politics from an early stage in his life. He participated in the first session of the Indian National Congress held in Bombay on 28 December 1885 representing the town of Gooty. At a later stage, he adopted more reactionary methods and was jailed from time to time. He was staunchly opposed to the Justice Party and the Dravidian Movement.

== Madras Legislative Council ==
Kesava Pillai served in the Madras Legislative Council for quite a long time and is credited with having proposed a number of reforms.

He was unanimously elected as the Deputy President of the Madras Legilative Council of 1920 by the other council members. The very first bill that was presented before the Legislative Council on 14 February 2021 was "The Deputy Presidents's Salary Bill, 1921". According to it he was awarded a salary of Rs.5000 per annum. Although an amendment was proposed for Rs.12000 per annum and another for Rs.1 per annum, both the amendments were put to vote and lost.

He was the principal architect of the Jail Commission and moved the Jail policy resolution which was passed by the government of the Raja of Panagal. He was also responsible for the creation of the Madras Forest Commission. Kesava Pillai was eventually elected vice-president of the Madras Legislative Council and served in his capacity for some time.

== Biographies ==
- Damodaram Pillai (1978). Gooty Kesava Pillai - A Deenabandhu of South India.
