= B. Munuswamy Naidu =

Indian politician

Bollini Munuswamy Naidu
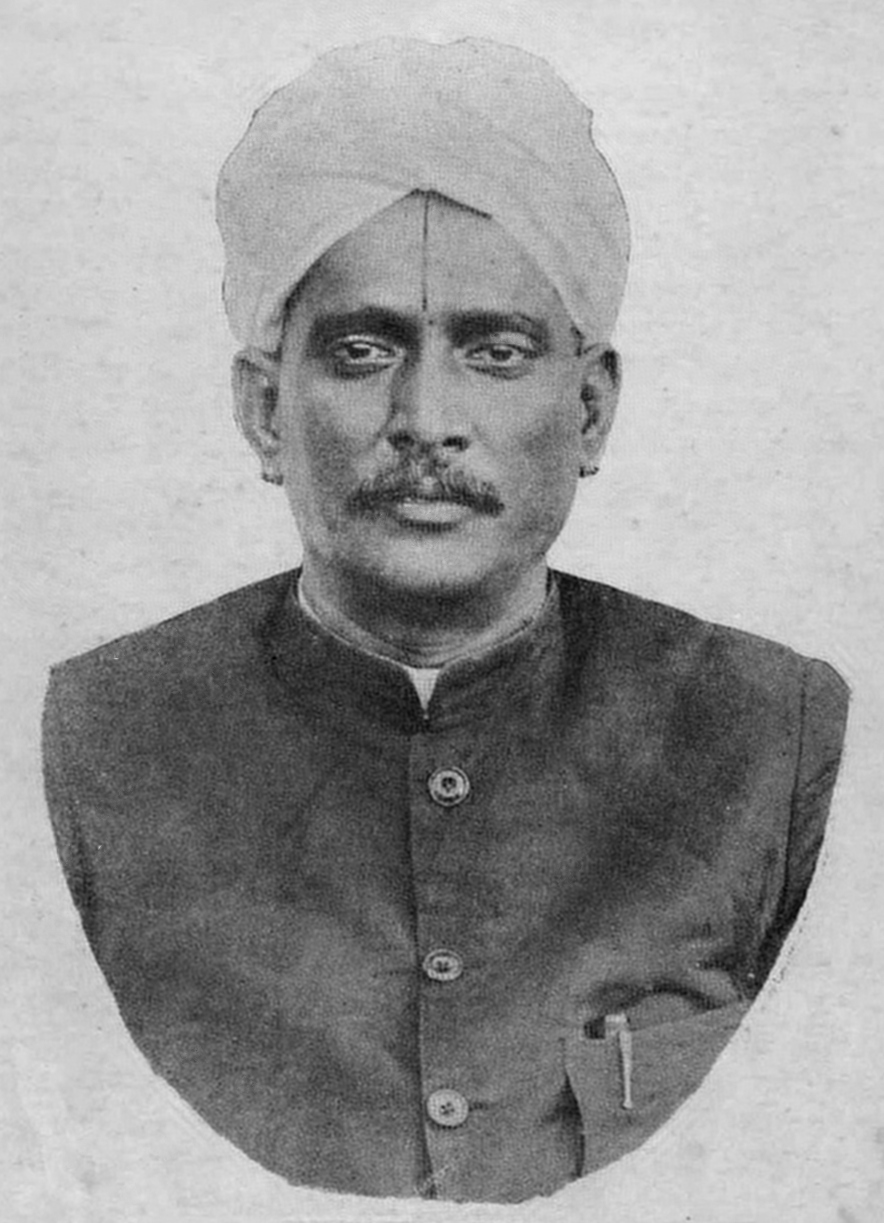

4th First Minister of Madras Presidency
- In office 27 October 1930 – 4 November 1932
- Governor: George Frederick Stanley
- Preceded by: P. Subbarayan
- Succeeded by: Raja of Bobbili

Minister of Local Self-Government (Madras Presidency)
- In office 27 October 1930 – 4 November 1932
- Premier: B. Munuswamy Naidu
- Governor: George Frederick Stanley
- Preceded by: P. Subbarayan
- Succeeded by: Raja of Bobbili

Personal details
- Born: 1885 Tiruttani, Chittoor district, Madras Presidency
- Died: 1935 (aged 49–50) Madras
- Party: Justice Party
- Occupation: politician
- Profession: lawyer

Bollini Munuswamy Naidu (1885 – 1935) was the First Minister of Madras Presidency from 27 October 1930 to 4 November 1932. He was conferred 'Rao Diwan Bahadur' by British Government.

Munuswamy Naidu was born in Tiruttani, Madras Presidency in 1885 in a family of agriculturists. He studied law and worked as a lawyer and businessman. He was one of the early members of the Justice Party. On the death of the Raja of Panagal in 1928, Munuswamy Naidu was appointed president of the Justice Party.

Munuswamy Naidu served as the president of the Justice Party from 1928 to 1932. Under his leadership, the Justice Party won the 1930 Madras Assembly elections and Munuswamy Naidu served as First Minister from 1930 to 1932. During Naidu's tenure, Madras was engulfed in a financial crisis arising out of the Great Depression. His tenure is also remembered for his clash with zamindars and his rivalry with the Raja of Bobbili. Naidu resigned in 1932 sensing serious opposition in party ranks. He lost the leadership of the party to the Raja of Bobbili and eventually retired from active politics. Munuswamy Naidu died in 1935. Munuswamy Naidu was a close associate of N. G. Ranga. Naidu's leadership is also remembered for his efforts to remove restrictions on Brahmins joining the party.

== Early life ==
Munuswamy Naidu was born in 1885 in Velanjeri in Tiruttani, Chittoor district of farmers. He was the inaugural First Minister from the Justice Party with an agriculturist background.

Munuswamy Naidu had his early education at Madras Christian College and graduated in law and practised as a lawyer. He was also a moneylender, farmer and businessman and owned a mill in Chittoor district.

== Rise to power ==
The Raja of Panagal, President of the South Indian Liberal Federation, died on 18 December 1928. Munuswamy Naidu was nominated to succeed him. Munuswamy Naidu led the Justice Party throughout its period in opposition between 1928 and 1930. He also led the party during the assembly elections held in 1930.

In the elections held in October 1930 in Madras Presidency, the Justice Party fielded 45 candidates and was in an alliance with the Ministerialists. As the Tamil Nadu Congress Committee did not participate in the elections, the Justice Party swept to power without encountering any serious opposition. The Justice Party secured an overwhelming majority in the districts of Vizagapatam, Chingleput, West Godavari, Bellary, Trichinopoly and Tinnevely. It claimed to have won nearly 70% of the total number of votes polled.

B. Munuswamy Naidu, the leader of the Justice Party, formed a government on 27 October 1930.

== As First Minister of Madras Presidency ==
Munuswamy Naidu took office as First Minister on 27 October 1930 and served till 4 November 1932 Munuswamy Naidu's tenure as First Minister was afflicted by controversies. He assumed the First Ministership at a critical juncture. The Great Depression was at its height and the economy was crumbling. Moreover, the southern districts of the Presidency had been afflicted by floods. The government was, therefore, compelled to increase the land tax in order to compensate for the fall in prices.

Munuswamy Naidu's Cabinet
Portfolio	Minister
Local Self-Government	B. Munuswamy Naidu (Also First Minister)
Development, Public Works and Registration	P. T. Rajan
Education, excise	S. Kumaraswami Reddiar
Source: Encyclopaedia of Political Parties

Soon after Munuswamy Naidu formed the government, the Justice Party was torn apart by factionalism. The Zamindars who had supported the Justice Party were disgruntled at the fact that two of the foremost landlords of the Presidency, the Raja of Bobbili and the Kumara Raja of Venkatagiri had not been included in the Cabinet. Under the leadership of M. A. Muthiah Chettiar, the disgruntled Zamindars organized a "ginger group" in November 1930.

This "ginger group" accused Munuswamy Naidu of having a soft corner for the Indian National Congress and Swarajists. Moreover, Munuswamy Naidu was also close to N. G. Ranga, the leader of the Ministerialists who were opposed to the Zamindars. Munuswamy Naidu gave his explanation

I did not provide a place in the ministry for a zamindar. I had no prejudice against any one, but in choosing my colleagues I had to be guided by the feeling in the party as a whole...The choice that I eventually made was not agreeable to the Hon. the Raja of Bobbili and some of his friends and consequently they began giving trouble in the party

When two of his ministers, P. T. Rajan and S. Kumaraswami Reddiar resigned their posts, Munuswamy Naidu resigned before any no-confidence motion could be brought forward. Munuswamy Naidu was succeeded by the Raja of Bobbili as First Minister.

== End of party leadership ==
The Twelfth Annual Confederation of the Justice Party was held at Tanjore on 10 – 11 October 1932. The Raja of Bobbili was chosen to preside over it. However, a faction supporting Munuswamy Naidu (then the First Minister) refused to allow the proceedings to continue. An eyewitness records that furniture and shoes were hurled around by members of opposing factions. However, the Raja of Bobbili prevailed and eventually assumed the leadership. This marked the end of Munuswamy Naidu's influence in the party and he gradually faded from limelight.

== Later life and death ==
Post Premiership, Munuswamy Naidu formed a separate party called Justice Democratic Party with his supporters and additionally had the support of 20 opposition members in the legislative council. He died in 1935 and his supporters rejoined the Justice party. A road in K. K. Nagar, Chennai has been named after him as Munuswamy Salai. (The caste suffix "Naidu" was dropped when caste suffixes were dropped from names of public places). A Bridge in the village Penamaluru in Krishna District of Andhra Pradesh was named after him.

== Ideology ==
Munuswamy Naidu was a staunch supporter of the Justice Party. At the same time, he also supported the admission of Brahmins in the party.

At a tripartite conference between the Justice Party, Ministerialists and Constitutionalists in Madras in 1929 a resolution was adopted recommending the removal of restrictions on Brahmins joining the organization. The executive committee of the party drafted a resolution to this effect and placed it before the Eleventh Confederation of the party at Nellore, for approval. At this Confederation, Munuswamy Naidu spoke:

So long as we exclude one community, we cannot as a political speak on behalf of or claim to represent all the people of our presidency. If, as we hope, provincial autonomy is given to the provinces as a result of the reforms that may be granted, it should be essential that our Federation should be in a position to claim to be a truly representative body of all communities. What objection can there be to admit such Brahmins as are willing to subscribe to the aims and objects of our Federation? It may be that the Brahmins may not join even if the ban is removed. But surely our Federation will not thereafter be open to objection on the ground that it is an exclusive organization

However, the resolution faced strong opposition and was eventually withdrawn.

== Cited sources ==
- Ralhan, O. P. (2002). Encyclopaedia of Political Parties. Anmol Publications PVT. LTD. ISBN 978-81-7488-865-5.

Preceded by Raja of Panagal	President of the South Indian Liberal Federation; 1928–1932	Succeeded by Raja of Bobbili
Preceded by P. Subbarayan	Minister of Local Self-Government in Madras Presidency; 27 October 1930 – 4 November 1932	Succeeded by
Preceded by P. Subbarayan	First Minister of Madras Presidency; 27 October 1930 – 4 November 1932	Succeeded by Raja of Bobbili
