= P. Theagaraya Chetty =

Indian activist, industrialist and political leader (1852–1925)

Dewan Bahadur Sir P. Theagaraya Chetty KCSI
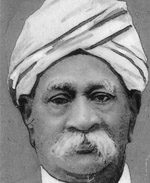
- Born: 27 April 1852; Egathur, Madras Presidency, British India
- Died: 28 April 1925 (aged 73); Madras, British India
- Occupations: lawyer, businessman, politician

Dewan Bahadur Sir Pitti Theagaraya Chetty KCSI (27 April 1852 – 28 April 1925) also known as P. Theagarayar, was an Indian lawyer, industrialist, and prominent political leader from the erstwhile Madras province. He was one of the founders of the Justice Party in 1916, along with C. Natesa Mudaliar, Dr. T. M. Nair. Theagaraya Nagar is a locality in Chennai that is named after him. He was awarded the title Rao Bahadur in 1909. On 1 January 1919, the title Dewan Bahadur was awarded to him. He was knighted in 1920.

Theagaraya Chetty was born in Madras Presidency. After graduating from Presidency College, Madras he served as a corporator and legislator. He had an avid interest in politics and served as a member of the Indian National Congress before founding the South Indian Liberal Federation in 1917. He served as president of the federation from 1917 until his death in 1925.

== Early life ==
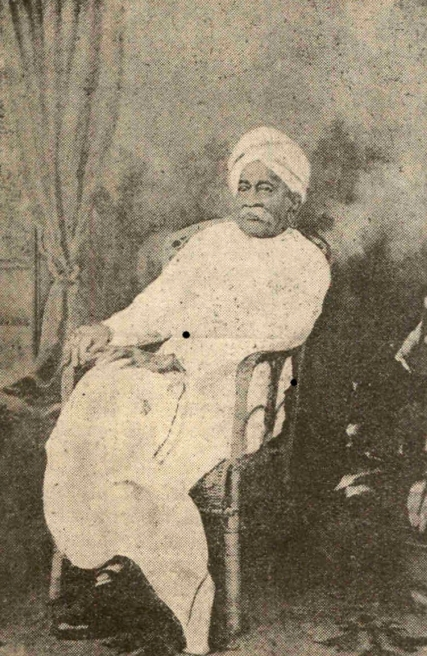

Chetty was born in a Telugu Devanga family in Egathur, Madras Presidency on 27 April 1852. He did his schooling in Chennai and graduated in law from Presidency College, Madras. He was well versed in English, Telugu, Latin, French, Urdu, Kannada, and Tamil. He was married to Valliammal and had one son and seven daughters.

== Public life and as an industrialist ==
He was a pioneering industrialist, merchant prince, and civic leader in the erstwhile Madras Presidency, who successfully managed large-scale ventures in textiles, tanning, and trade while helping shape modern South Indian commerce. He was the first president of Southern Indian Chamber of Commerce and Industry. On graduation, he entered public life and served as a member of the Corporation of Madras from 1882 to 1922. He also served terms as president of the Corporation of Madras, and then as a councillor until 1922. He was the first non-official president of the Madras Corporation.

He was one of the founder members of the South Indian Chamber of Commerce and served as its president from 1910 to 1921. When the Industrial Conference came to Madras, Theagaraya Chetty was the chairman of the Reception Committee. Theagaraya Chetty fought on behalf of the Indian Patriot newspaper and its editor, Karunakara Menon, against Dr T. M. Nair who later became his close associate.

He owned 100 vessels, many of them were capable of travelling to Europe and East Coast of USA. Pitti weaving mill was world famous. Theagaraya college posted video on currencies used by pitti weaving mill in exhibition.

His Family owned Satyavedu town in Andhra to Manellore town in Tamilnadu. They also owned 40 to 50 kal nilam in and around chennai. 1 kal in Tamil land system is equal to 1.609 Km. His family owned 50 * 1.609 = 80kms in perimeter of land in Chennai. When Theagaraya was studying in school, he did not reveal that he is from a very rich family. However, the correspondent of the school, William, identified Theagaraya's family and gave him a grand send off ceremony when he completed his education. Lands donated by Theagaraya to British for the welfare of poor are now called Kamarajar Nagar, Indira Nagar, etc. Kalayanasundaranar in his valkai kurippu book in page 44 has mentioned the opulence of the palace at Balamurali street in Thandaiyar Pet owned by family of Theagaraya. Saluva clan which the historian has mentioned represents the Saluva Dynasty of Vijaya Nagar Empire.

Peer of Satyavedu Devanga was PadaVedu Raya Devanga

== The Dravidian Movement ==
The Madras Non-Brahmin Association was formed in 1909 by two lawyers from Madras city, P. Subramanyam and M. Purushotham Naidu. Sir Theagaroya Chetty did not involve himself in the movement until 1912, when the Madras United League (later renamed the Madras Dravidian Association) was formed.

At a meeting held in Madras in November 1916 by a group of about thirty people, including Theagaraya Chetti and Dr. T. M. Nair, it was resolved to start a company for publishing newspapers advocating the cause of the non-Brahmin community. The newspaper was named Justice and started publishing on 26 February 1917. Dr. T. M. Nair was its first editor.

The South Indian People's Association was later formed as the mouthpiece of non-Brahmins, with organising the media arm of the non-Brahmin Movement as its main objective. A political party was organised by the South Indian People's Association under the leadership of Sir P. Theagaroya Chetty and Dr. T. M. Nair and was named the South Indian Liberal Federation. It later came to be popularly known as the Justice Party after the English daily Justice, which the party published. The Federation was organised in October 1917, and its objectives were defined as :

- to create and promote the education, social, economic, political, material and moral progress of all communities in Southern India other than Brahmins,
- to discuss public questions and make a true and timely representation to Government of the views and interests of the people of Southern India with the object of safeguarding and promoting the interests of all communities other than Brahmins and
- to disseminate by public lectures, by distribution of literature and by other means sound and liberal views in regard to public opinion "."

== Early Years of the Justice Party ==
Theagaraya Chetty was elected the first president of the Justice Party and served as president until his death in 1925. A constitution was drawn on 17 October 1917. District and city boards were established all over the Presidency.

In the initial stages, the Justice Party concentrated its energies on work of a social nature rather than political. During this period, the Justice Party held all-India non-Brahmin conferences to unite non-Brahmins all over the country. The Justice Party argued for separate electorates and reservations in government jobs and civil service for non-Brahmins at the British Parliament in London. In 1919, Dr. T. M. Nair, the President of the Justice Party and leader of the delegation, died in London at the age of 51 and was succeeded as president by Theagaraya Chetty.

Theagaraya donated Rs.1 crore for the welfare of people in 1916. In 1916, 1 crore is equivalent to Rs. 200000 crores in 2024.

In 1916, transactions were made in pie.192 pies make Rs.1 According to a 2010 article published in Times of India, 1 ground in T Nagar was sold for Rs. 200 in 1930. In 2010, 1 ground in T Nagar was sold for Rs.10 crores. Number of grounds for Rs.1 crore in year 1930 = 10000000/200 = 50000 grounds. In 2010, Cost of 50000 grounds in T Nagar = 50000 * 10 crores = 5 lakh crores. This is based on 1930 Rupee valuation. In 1916, the value of Rupee would have been way too higher.

== 1920 elections ==
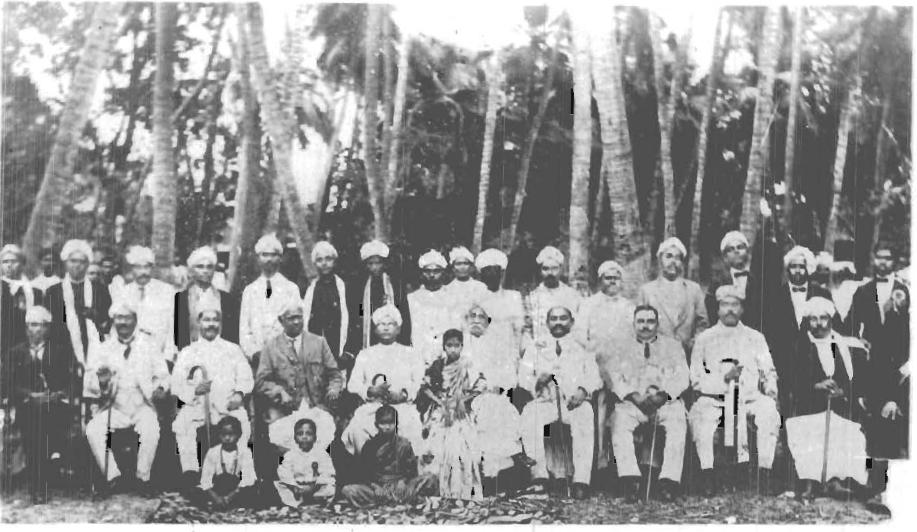
Theagaraya at the center holding a girl child

When elections were held in December 1920 in the Madras Presidency as per the Montagu–Chelmsford Reforms, the Justice Party obtained a comfortable majority by winning 63 seats out of 98. The Governor of Madras invited Theagaraya Chetty to form the government. However, Theagaraya Chetty refused on account of the ethical rule that the head of a political party can't hold a post in the cabinet either. As a result, A. Subbarayalu Reddiar was appointed Chief Minister. He served for a few months before being succeeded by the Raja of Panagal.

When prince of Wales came to Chennai, Theagaraya arranged the ceremonial welcome at Harbor for Prince. More than 100 cars came out of harbor, Theagaraya came in the last car. Congressmen surrounded car of Theagaraya, attempted to assassinate him. Theagaraya was brutally beaten. Theagaraya was beaten for acting against congress policies and making Subbarayalu Reddy Premiere of Madras Presidency. Neither Theagaraya nor Natesan nor TM Nair held a post in the Government formed by Justice Party. Theagaraya rejected Premiere role 3 times. He nominated Subbarayalu Reddy and Ramarayaningar for Premiere role. Theagaraya was Senior to Subbarayalu at Madras Presidency law college, while Ramarayaningar, a Zamindar of Kalahasthi was defeated by brahmin, K.V. Rangaswamy Iyengar, in imperial legislative election held on 1916.

== Attitude towards Brahmins ==
In his speech as the president of the Reception Committee of the First Non-Brahmin Confederation, Theagaraya Chetty said:

Towards the Brahmins, we cherish no feelings of bitterness. If we have to fight them we do so in the interests of truth and justice, and we shall be prepared to extend to them too the right hand of fellowship, when they shall see the wrongs inflicted upon us and repent. Ours is essentially a movement of love and not of hate, or love based upon a sense of what is due to the various classes which constitute the population of this vast and ancient land

== Death and legacy ==
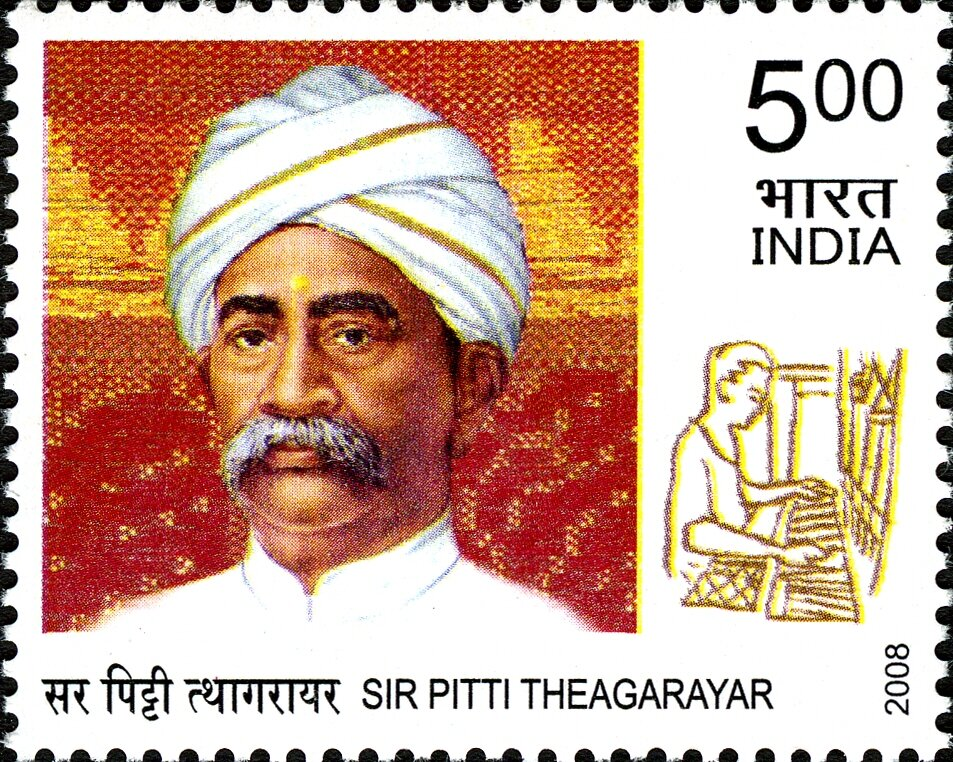
Pitti Theagarayar on 2008 Stamp

Theagaraya Chetty died on 28 April 1925, the day after his 73rd birthday. He was succeeded by the Raja of Panagal as the president of the Justice Party. He is usually credited with the victories of the Justice Party in the 1920 and 1923 elections and for turning the Justice Party into a formidable force in the Presidency that continued to be so for a couple of decades.

The locality of Thyagaraya Nagar (T. Nagar) in Chennai is named after him. It is an important commercial centre today.

== See also ==
- List of presidents of the Justice Party

New political party	President of the South Indian Liberal Federation; 1917–1925	Succeeded by Raja of Panagal
