= Thiru. V. Kalyanasundaram =

Tamil scholar and activist (1883–1953)

T. V. Kalyanasundaram
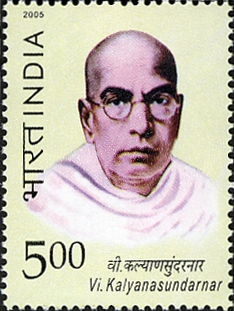
- Born: Thiruvarur Viruttachala Kalyanasundaram; 26 August 1883; Thullam, Madras Presidency, British India
- Died: 17 September 1953 (aged 70)
- Occupations: Scholar, activist
- Spouse: Kamalambigai (expired 1918)

Thiruvarur Viruttachala Kalyanasundaram (Thiruvarur Virudhachala Kalyanasundaram : 26 August 1883 – 17 September 1953), better known by his initials Thiru. Vi. Ka, was an Indian scholar, essayist and activist for the Tamil language. The analytical depth of his commentaries on classical Tamil literature and philosophy, and the clear, fluid style of his prose. His works, along with those of V. O. Chidambaram Pillai, Maraimalai Adigal, and Arumuka Navalar, are considered to have defined the style of modern Tamil prose.

== History ==
Thiru Vi.Kalyanasundaram was born in a chozhia Vellalar family in the village of Thullam, presently called Thandalam in Chengalpet district, near Chennai in the southern Indian state of Tamil Nadu on 26 August 1883. His family moved to Thiruvarur as his father got transferred. He attended the Wesley College High School, and also studied Tamil under Maraimalai Adigal and N. Kathiravel Pillai of Jaffna. He worked briefly as a teacher and, in 1917, became an editorial assistant on Desabaktan, a nationalist, Tamil daily newspaper. Thiru Vi. Ka. was soon involved in various aspects of the independence movement. During this period, he became a strong campaigner for worker rights. In 1918 he became active in the trade union movement as an associate of BP Wadia and organised the first trade unions in the south of India.

== Contribution to literature ==
In 1920, Thiru. Vi. Ka. started a new Tamil weekly magazine, titled Navasakthi. Navasakthi would be the vehicle for his thoughts for much of the rest of his life. Thiru Vi. Ka. sought to make his magazine a beacon to the Tamil people. His writings reflected his political and philosophical views. He published one of the first Tamil interpretations of the thought of Mahatma Gandhi, which is still regarded as an important milestone in Gandhian studies. He wrote a number of works on the religious and spiritual thought of Ramalinga Swamigal, an influential Tamil Saivite philosopher-saint of the 19th century. He wrote commentaries on a number of works of classical Tamil literature, which appeared as serials in Navasakthi. Over the course of his writing career, Thiru Vi. Ka. published over fifty books. These include Manitha Vazhkkaiyum Gandhiyadigalum, a study of the implications of Gandhi's thought for human conduct. His Pennin perumai allatu valkait tunai nalam was one of the most read books of that period. Also very influential, albeit at a more critical level, is his study of the concept of Beauty in Hinduism, published as Murugan alladhu azaku (Lord Murugan or Beauty). His writings reflect the internationalism characteristic of Indian intellectuals of that period, a strong pride in Indian and Tamil culture, coupled with a strong belief in the unity and universal kinship of all human thought.

In his writings, Thiru Vi. Ka. developed a prose style which built on the inner rhythms of the Tamil language and produced a rhythmic, flowing text. The field of Tamil prose was still relatively new, and the style he developed was extremely influential. His works are today seen as having given a new energy to the Tamil language and regarded as part of the foundations on which the modern Tamil prose style has been built.

== Politics ==
Through this period, Thiru Vi. Ka. continued to remain active in politics and the Indian independence struggle. He was considered to be one of the three pillars of the Indian National Congress in Tamil Nadu, even becoming the President of the Tamil Nadu Congress Committee in 1926. He spent much time touring Tamil Nadu, making speeches on the need for independence. He remained active well into his sixties, and did not retire from politics until Indian independence in 1947.

== Death ==
Thiru Vi. Ka. died on 17 September 1953 at the age of 71.

== Recognition ==
- On 21 October 2005, the Indian government commemorated his life by releasing a stamp in his honor.
- Thiru. Vi. Ka Nagar, Chennai
- Thiru. Vi. Ka Park, Chennai
- Thiru. Vi. Ka Bridge, Adyar, Chennai

== See also ==
- List of Indian writers
