= 1921 Buckingham and Carnatic Mills strike =

Worker strike

The 1921 Buckingham and Carnatic Mills strike was a strike by the workers of Buckingham and Carnatic Mills in the city of Madras (now called Chennai), India, against the managing company, Binny and Co. The strike, which lasted from June to October 1921, caused severe losses to the Madras economy. It also created a rift in the ruling Justice Party forcing many Dalit leaders to leave.

== Causes ==
The Madras Labour Union was one of the first organised labour unions in India, having been founded by B. P. Wadia and V. Kalyanasundaram Mudaliar on 3 April 1918. Early union activity took place in the Buckingham and Carnatic Mills during October–December 1920 when workers went on strike in protest against working conditions. The government responded by ordering the police to shoot down striking workers on 9 December 1920 to bring the strike to a forceful end.

There was widespread unrest among the workers over the low wages and poor working conditions. Their demands were supported by Indian nationalists C. Rajagopalachari, S. Kasturi Ranga Iyengar, A. Rangaswami Iyengar, Singaravelu Chetty, V. Chakkarai Chettiar and S. Satyamurti and by the self-rule supporting Indian National Congress as well as the pro-British Justice Party.

== Events ==
On 20 May 1921, the workers in the Spinning Department of the Buckingham and Carnatic Mills refused to work until the management agreed to discuss their wage rise demands. The protest reached serious proportions when an official strike was declared on 20 June. The striking workers were led by Congressman V. Kalyanasundaram Mudaliar. The Indian National Congress convened a meeting in Madras on 10 July 1921; in this meeting, C. Rajagopalachari moved for a resolution sympathizing with the workers of the Buckingham and Carnatic Mills and supporting their cause.

The strike lasted for a total of six months. The authorities adopted a ruthless policy to suppress the agitation. On 29 August 1921, the police opened fire, killing six workers. Almost all the Justice Party leaders joined hands with the Indian National Congress politicians and supported the strike. The support lent by the Justice Party towards striking workers is believed by some to have been influenced by caste identifications, while others believe that the strike actually gave the Justice Party ministry a stick with which to beat the Governor's council, as the Home ministry came under the direct control of the Governor of Madras. The management tactically broke up the unity of the workers by allegedly enlisting the support of Dalits and Indian Christians who had not joined the strike.

The abstention of Dalit workers from the strike was severely criticized by the Raja of Panagal, the Chief Minister of Madras Presidency and O. Thanikachalam Chetti. The strike gradually evolved into a confrontation between caste Hindu and Muslim workers who were determined to continue the strike on one hand, and Dalits and Indian Christians who did not participate in the strike on the other. A communal riot broke out on 28 June 1921 when a caste Hindu mob attacked the Dalit village of Pulianthope and burnt a hundred huts. The Justice Party's publication, Justice blamed the riots on the "pampering" of Dalits by the Labour Department of the Madras government while Dalit leader M. C. Rajah accused the union leaders of threatening non-participating Dalits from entering the mills. He also criticized the attitude of the Justice Party government of the Raja of Panagal towards Dalits:

the high-handed poisonous action of members of a party who after inflicting all known and unknown injury on our community shed crocodile tears and pose as friends of the Depressed classes

The strike eventually came to an end in October through the mediation of C. Natesa Mudaliar. That month, Sir P. Theagaraya Chetty, the then President of the Madras Labour Union, advised workers to resume work. But with the exception of a few, most of the striking workers were not re-admitted.

== Aftermath ==
In the aftermath of the strike, the major political factions in the Madras Presidency began leveling charges against one another. The Indian National Congress blamed the government for the ruthless suppression of labour activities, while the Justice Party blamed the Non-Cooperation Movement for causing the unrest and criticized the government for showing partiality towards Dalits. The party demanded that the provision of free meals to Dalits in government camps should be stopped and offenders from all the communities be punished.

The Madras government appointed a three-member enquiry committee headed by Sir William Ayling to investigate the causes of the strike. The committee blamed the striking workers for causing extensive damage to property and life, and highlighted the victimization of "Adi Dravidas". The Home Member of the Governor's Executive Council, Sir Lionel Davidson, said that all the violence was caused not by a labour strike but by "a faction inflamed by caste prejudice".

M. C. Rajah made the following observation on Dalits and the strike:

If they had been with the rioters in the rioting, they would have certainly lost their lives. The very fact that no Adi Dravida was shot clearly indicates that the Adi Dravidas were not creating the mischief ... but my friend Mr. Thanikachalam Chettiyar has said nothing about the throwing of bombs which has become the fashion of the rioters. How many lives have been lost by the throwing of bombs, who threw them, these are questions which my honourable friend ought to have put before the Council
