= John Alexander Boyson =

Indian-Scottish businessman

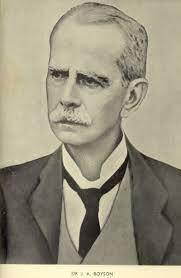
- Died: 1926
- Occupation: Manager
- Children: John Charles Boyson

John Alexander Boyson was an Indian-Scottish businessman. He served and led Binny and Co. from 1871 to 1926. He was also chairman of the Madras Chamber of Commerce.

He was a director on the board of the Bank of Madras. He member of the Madras Musical Association and also he presided over the Madras Club as well as Gymkhana.

== Biography ==
His father, J. R. Boyson, was a solicitor for the Government of Madras and was one of the founders of the National Bank of India.

In 1871, John took over R.O. Campbell's share in the Binny and Co. During his tenure, as one of the senior partners, Binny ventured into the yarn business for which it is remembered today. Under Boyson, Binny pioneered electricity and trams in Madras.

In 1885, he was appointed to a seat in the Madras Legislative Council.

In 1906, Arbuthnot Crash caused Binny to loss a lot of money. Boyson tried to organise a local guarantee but this failed. He then negotiated with James Lyle Mackay, founder of the Inchcape group and the Inchcape group agreed to acquire and restructure Binny. His partnership stake in the old firm became worthless but he managed to make himself managers of the new firm with an annual salary of 3500 pounds plus 20% of the net profits.

In 1914, he was knighted and returned to England where he remained a Director at the London office till his death in 1926.
