= Kalpana Balakrishnan =

Indian medical researcher

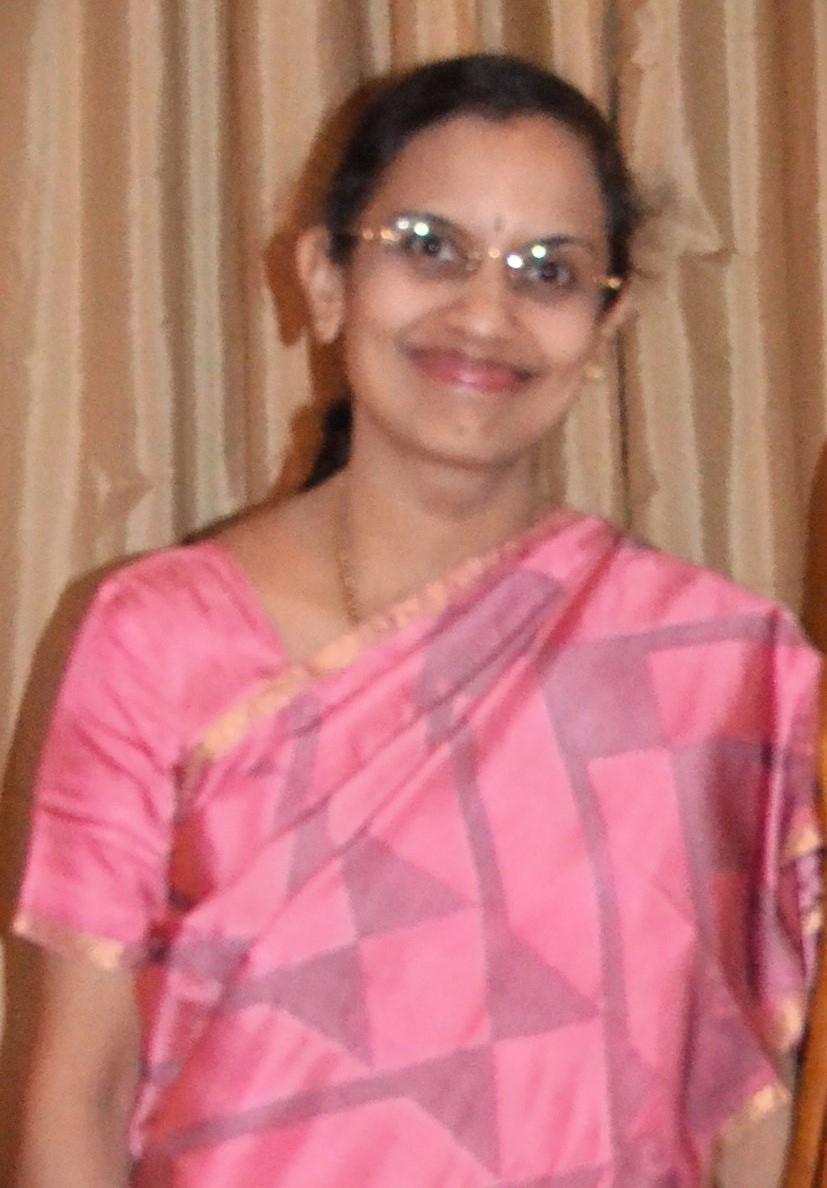
- Balakrishnan in 2012
- Education: Johns Hopkins University; All India Institute of Medical Sciences
- Scientific career
- Workplaces: Sri Ramachandra Institute of Higher Education and Research
- Thesis: Sulfhydral reagents regulate and modulate the cGMP-dependent cation channel of bovine rod photoreceptors (1990)

Kalpana Balakrishnan is an Indian medical researcher who is a professor and Dean (Research) at the Sri Ramachandra Institute of Higher Education and Research. Her research has been in the area of air pollution and environmental health risk assessments with a special focus on low and middle income countries. She is an elected member of the National Academy of Medical Sciences.

== Early life and education ==
Balakrishnan grew up in India. She was an undergraduate student at the All India Institute of Medical Sciences. She was a doctoral researcher in biophysics at Johns Hopkins University, where she also worked as a postdoctoral researcher. Her doctorate considered the role of sulfhydral reagents in the regulation and modulation of cyclic nucleotide-gated channels. During her postdoctoral research, she became increasingly interested in public health, learning about health economics and population dynamics.

== Research and career ==
Balakrishnan returned to India in 1996. She has spent much of her career at the Sri Ramachandra Institute of Higher Education and Research. Balakrishnan works on air pollution and environmental risk assessments. Her early research considered the health risks from exposure to chromium. She performed occupational and population level environmental assessments, developed solutions and made recommendations for policy changes. She uses mother-child cohort studies and randomized controlled trials to examine the effectiveness of air pollution interventions on early childhood and cardiovascular outcomes. Her research revealed that exposure to fine particulate matter caused lower birthweights in newborn babies and advocated for a shift to LPG as a fuel.

As Dean of the Sri Ramachandra Institute of Higher Education and Research, Balakrishnan signed a memorandum of understanding with Colorado State University to offer joint programmes between the United States and India.

== Awards and honours ==
- 1998 Harvard Medical School Award for Excellence in Environmental Health Research
- 1999 Outstanding Woman Scientist Award
- 2000 Hari Om Ashram Trust Award
- 2008 Public Health Foundation of India Award
- 2014 Elected to the National Academy of Medical Sciences of India
- 2021 Clarivate India Research Excellence Citation Award

== Selected publications ==
- Theo Vos; Ryan M Barber; Brad Bell; et al. (5 June 2015). "Global, regional, and national incidence, prevalence, and years lived with disability for 301 acute and chronic diseases and injuries in 188 countries, 1990-2013: a systematic analysis for the Global Burden of Disease Study 2013". The Lancet. 386 (9995): 743–800. doi:10.1016/s0140-6736(15)60692-4. ISSN 0140-6736. PMC 4561509. PMID 26063472. Wikidata Q28083357.
- Richard Fuller; Philip J Landrigan; Kalpana Balakrishnan; et al. (June 2022). "Pollution and health: a progress update". Lancet Planetary Health. 6 (6): e535–e547. doi:10.1016/s2542-5196(22)00090-0. ISSN 2542-5196. PMID 35594895. Wikidata Q113858437.
