= 1926 Binny Mills strike =

Labour dispute in India

The Binny Mills strike of 1926 was a general strike in 1926 in the Bangalore Woollen, Cotton and Silk Mills, which was popularly known as Binny Mills in Bangalore. The strike is considered to be a part of the Indian independence movement.

The strike was caused by the 1925 decision government of Mysore State to amend the 1914 Factory Act, which had recommended the reduction of working hours, increased wages and better working conditions. That caused unrest among the factory workers.

Binny Mills management filed a civil suit claiming damages from the strike. Workers formed Bangalore Textile Trade Union in 1929.
