= Demographics of the Madras Presidency =

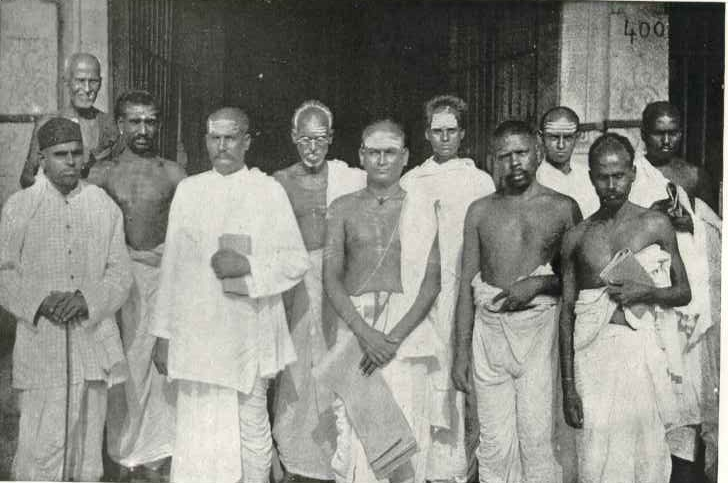
Census superintendent and enumerators in Pasumalai, Madras Presidency, circa 1911

The first census of the Madras Presidency was taken in the year 1822. It returned a population of 13,476,923. The second census conducted in 1836-37 returned a population of 13,967,395, an increase of only 490,472 in 15 years. The first quinquennial enumeration of the population was made in 1851–52. It returned a population of 22,031,697. Subsequent enumerations were made in 1856–57, 1861–62 and 1866–67. The population of Madras Presidency was found to be 22,857,855 in 1851–52, 24,656,509 in 1861-62 and 26,539,052 in 1866–67.

The first organized census of India was conducted in 1871. It returned a population of 31,220,973 for Madras Presidency. Since then, a census has been conducted once every ten years. The last census of British India held in 1941 returned a population of 49,341,810 for Madras Presidency.

Districts of the Madras Presidency
District	District Headquarters	Area (sq mi)	Year of incorporation	Population							
District	District Headquarters	Area (sq mi)	Year of incorporation	1871	1881	1891	1901	1911	1921	1931	1941
Anantapur	Anantapur	5,557	1800	741,255	599,899	727,725	788,254	963,223			1,166,255
Anjengo	Anjengo	1	1906	-	-	-	-	4,817			
Bellary	Bellary	5,714	1800	911,755	726,275	880,950	947,214	969,436			1,051,235
Chingleput	Saidapet	5,079	1763	938,184	981,381	1,202,928	1,312,122	1,321,000			1,171,419
Coimbatore	Coimbatore	7,860	1799	1,763,274	1,657,690	2,004,839	2,201,752		3,219,848		2,809,648
Cuddapah	Cuddapah	8,723	1800	1,351,194	1,121,038	1,272,072	1,291,267				1,056,507
East Godavari	Cocanada		1765	-	-	-	-	-	1,756,477	1,976,743	2,161,863
Ganjam	Berhampur	8,372	1765	1,520,088	1,749,604	1,896,803	2,010,256	-	-	-	-
Godavari	Cocanada	7,972	1765	1,592,939	1,791,512	2,078,782	2,301,759	1,530,000	2,583,250	-	-
Kistna	Masulipatam	8,498	1765/1801	1,452,374	1,548,480	1,855,582	2,154,803	1,997,535	2,133,314		1,444,294
Kurnool	Kurnool	7,878	1800	914,432	678,551	817,811	872,055	889,000			1,146,250
Madras	Madras	27	1639	367,552	405,848	452,518	509,346	518,660	526,000	645,000	777,481
Madura	Madura	8,701	1761/1790/1801	2,266,615	2,168,680	2,608,404	2,831,280	1,861,000	2,007,063		2,446,601
Malabar	Calicut	5,795	1792	2,261,250	2,365,035	2,652,565	2,800,555	3,015,119	3,098,871		3,929,425
Nellore	Nellore	8,761	1781	1,376,811	1,220,236	1,463,736	1,496,987	1,296,000			1,617,026
Nilgiris	Ootacamund	958	1799	49,501	91,034	99,797	111,437	80,000			209,709
North Arcot	Chittoor	7,386	1781/1801	2,015,278	1,817,814	2,114,487	2,207,712	1,822,000	2,055,594		2,577,540
Salem	Salem	7,530	1792	1,966,995	1,599,595	1,962,591	2,204,974	1,766,680	2,112,034		2,869,228
South Arcot	Cuddalore	5,217	1781/1801	1,755,817	1,814,738	2,162,851	2,349,894	2,272,000	2,320,085		2,608,758
South Kanara	Mangalore	4,021	1799	918,362	959,514	1,056,081	1,134,713				1,523,516
Tanjore	Tanjore	3,710	1799	1,973,731	2,130,383	2,228,114	2,245,029	2,362,639	2,326,265	2,385,920	2,563,375
Tinnevely	Tinnevely	5,389	1761/1801	1,693,959	1,699,747	1,916,095	2,059,607				2,244,548
Trichinopoly	Trichinopoly	2,632	1781/1801	1,200,408	1,215,033	1,372,717	1,444,770				2,194,091
Vizagapatam	Waltair	17,222	1794	2,159,199	2,485,141	2,802,992	2,933,650		2,231,874		3,845,944
West Godavari	Eluru		1765	-	-	-	-	-	-		1,380,088
Total	Madras	141,705		31,220,973	30,827,218	35,630,440	38,209,436	41,870,160	42,794,155	46,740,107	49,341,810
Princely States of Madras Presidency
Banganapalle	Banganapalle	255		45,208	30,754	34,596	32,264	39,344	36,692	39,218	44,592
Cochin	Cochin	1,362		601,114	600,278	722,906	812,025	979,080	918,110	1,205,016	1,422,875
Pudukkottai	Pudukkottai	1,100		316,695	302,127	373,096	380,440	411,886	426,313	400,694	438,648
Sandur	Sandur	161		14,996	10,532	11,388	11,200	13,517	11,665	13,583	15,814
Travancore	Trivandrum	7,091		2,311,379	2,401,158	2,557,736	2,952,157	3,428,975	4,006,062	5,095,973	6,070,018
Total		9,969		32,85,938	33,44,849	36,99,722	41,88,086	48,72,802	53,98,842	67,54,484	79,91,947
Source: The Imperial Gazetteer of India

== Cities ==
Position	1871	1881	1891	1901	1911	1921	1931	1941
1	Madras (367,552)	Madras (405,848)	Madras (452,518)	Madras (509,346)	Madras (518,660)	Madras (526,911)	Madras (647,232)	Madras (777,481)
2	Trichinopoly (76,530)	Trichinopoly (84,449)	Trichinopoly (90,609)	Madura (105,984)	Madura (134,130)	Madura (138,894)	Madura (182,018)	Madura (239,144)
3	Tanjore (52,171)	Madura (73,807)	Madura (87,428)	Trichinopoly (104,721)	Trichinopoly (123,512)	Trichinopoly (120,422)	Trichinopoly (142,843)	Trichinopoly (159,566)
4	Madura (51,987)	Calicut (57,085)	Salem (67,710)	Calicut (76,981)	Calicut (82,334)	Calicut (78,417)	Salem (102,179)	Coimbatore (130,348)
5	Bellary (51,766)	Tanjore (54,745)	Calicut (66,078)	Salem (70,621)	Kumbakonam (64,647)	Coimbatore (65,788)	Calicut (99,273)	Salem (129,702)
6	Salem (50,012)	Negapatam (53,855)	Bellary (59,447)	Kumbakonam (59,673)	Tanjore (60,341)	Conjeevaram (61,376)	Coimbatore (95,198)	Calicut (126,352)
7	Negapatam (48,525)	Bellary (53,460)	Negapatam (59,221)	Bellary (58,247)	Negapatam (60,168)	Kumbakonam (60,700)	Tanjore (66,889)	Bezawada (86,184)
8	Calicut (48,338)	Salem (50,667)	Tanjore (54,390)	Tanjore (57,870)	Salem (59,152)	Tanjore (59,913)	Mangalore (66,756)	Guntur (83,599)
9	Kumbakonam (44,444)	Kumbakonam (54,307)	Kumbakonam (54,307)	Negapatam (57,190)	Cuddalore (56,574)	Negapatam (54,016)	Cocanada (65,952)	Mangalore (81,069)
10	Cuddalore (40,300)	Cuddalore (43,564)	Cuddalore (47,355)	Coimbatore (53,080)	Cocanada (54,410)	Mangalore (53,877)	Kumbakonam (62,317)	Tuticorin (75,614)
