= Madras Musical Association =

- Origin: Madras
- Years active: 1893; 133 years ago
- Website: http://www.mma.ind.in/

Madras Musical Association was founded in 1893 in St Andrew's Church by European residents in Madras and an Italian Signor Aloysio was its first chair and the Governor of Madras Presidency was its patron. Handel Manuel was the first Indian conductor. A whole range of music from classical, gospel, jazz, country, western and pop is played.
