= Slavery in the Madras Presidency =

Slavery in the Madras Presidency during the British Raj affected close to 20% of the population. Madras Presidency was an administrative subdivision (presidency) of British India. At its greatest extent, the presidency included most of southern India. The landlords were predominantly higher caste individuals. When those from the lower castes borrowed money against their land and defaulted, they entered a life of debt bondage. The slaves formed 12.2% of the total population in 1930.

The patterns of slavery and slave population varied between districts. Various laws were passed during 1811, 1812 and 1823 to restrict slavery and prevent child labour, though the slave trade was only ended with the Indian Slavery Act, 1843, and the sale of slaves became a criminal offence in 1862 under the new Indian Penal Code.

== The presidency ==
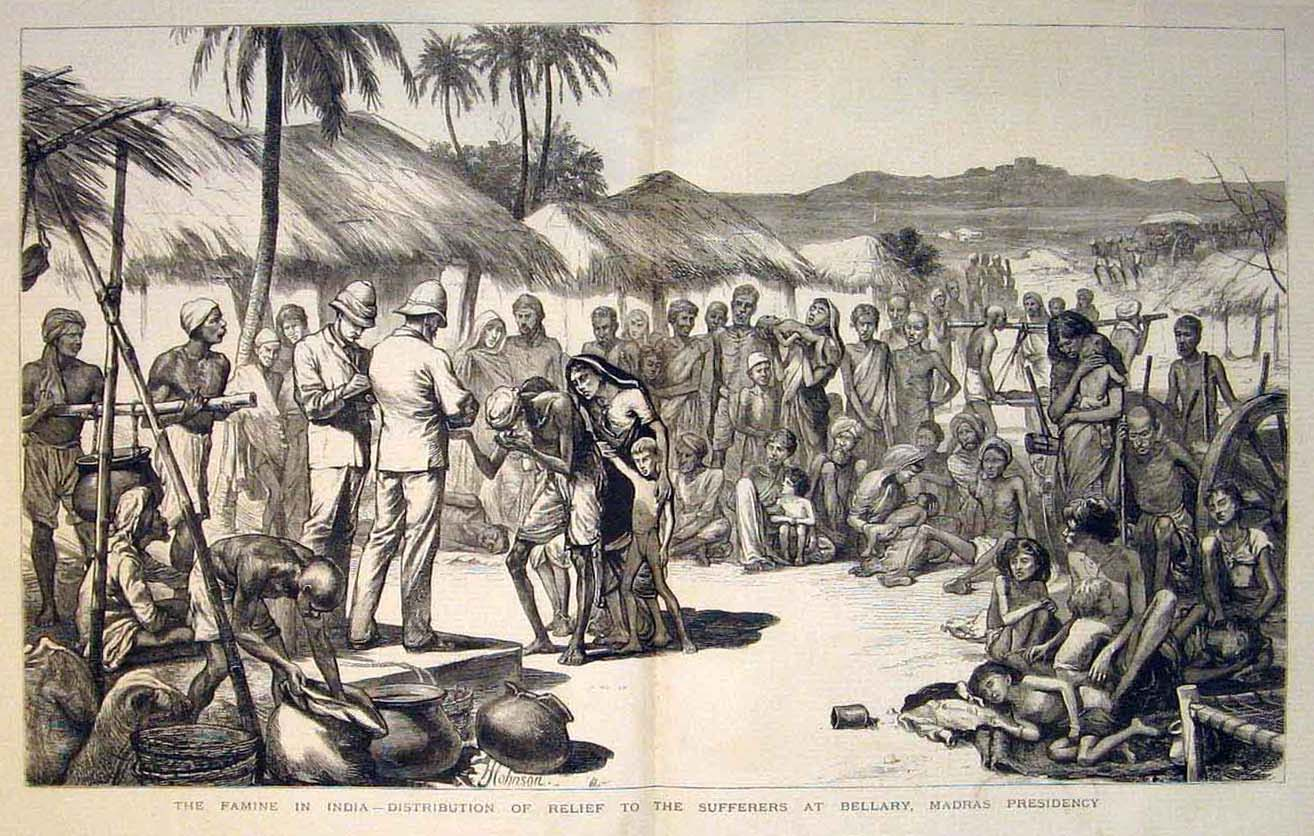
Distribution of famine relief in 1877 in Madras Province

Madras Presidency, or the Presidency of Fort St. George, also known as Madras Province, was an administrative subdivision (presidency) of British India. At its greatest extent, the presidency included most of southern India, including the whole of the Indian state of Tamil Nadu, and parts of Andhra Pradesh, Kerala, Karnataka, Telangana, Odisha and the union territory of Lakshadweep. In 1639, the English East India Company purchased the village of Madraspatnam and one year later it established the Agency of Fort St George, precursor of the Madras Presidency, although there had been Company factories at Machilipatnam and Armagon since the very early 1600s. The agency was upgraded to a Presidency in 1652 before once more reverting to its previous status in 1655. In 1684, it was re-elevated to a Presidency and Elihu Yale was appointed as president. In 1785, under the provisions of Pitt's India Act, Madras became one of three provinces established by the East India Company. Thereafter, the head of the area was styled "Governor" rather than "President" and became subordinate to the Governor-General in Calcutta, a title that would persist until 1947.

== Pattern ==
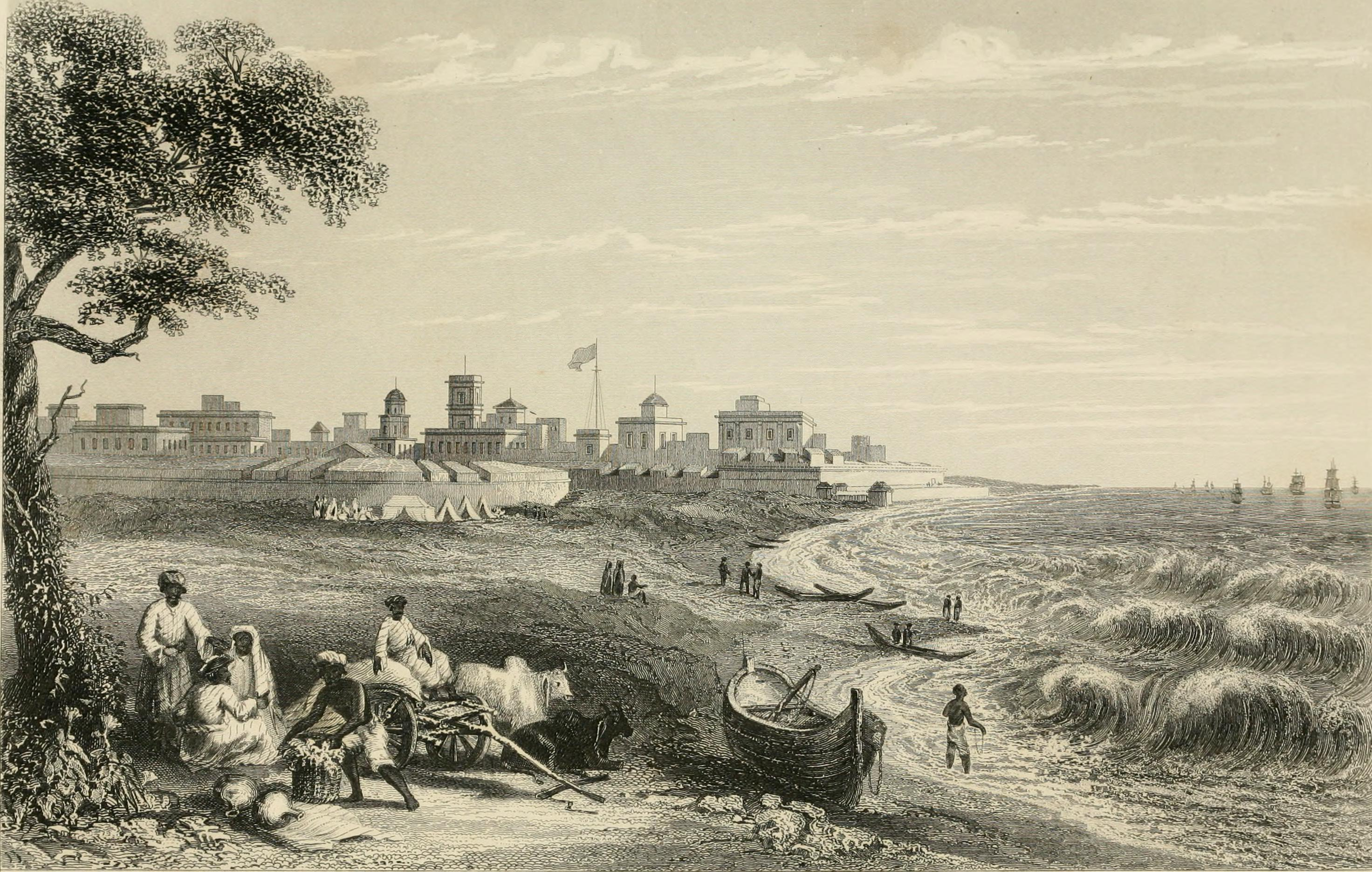
Fort St. George painting from 1858

The Mirasdars, or landlords, were usually from the higher castes. Lower caste individuals borrowed money against their holdings from the mirasdars for marriage expenses, housing, or farming costs. On defaulting, they would find themselves obliged to repay the debt through labour. Hereditary relationships continued between debtors and their masters, as generations found themselves in debt bondage, leading to slavery. The pattern of slavery also varied between Hindus and Muslims. Muslims usually ran a market as in North India. Triplicane (in modern day Chennai), an area in the Presidency, where Muslim rulers were predominant, had a slave market in the 1790s when women and children were sold. Only the Vellalars had had Mirasi privileges initially, but the practice was developed under the subsequent Hindu dynasties. By the time the British had formed their dominance, almost every castes, with the exception of the untouchables, had proprietary rights of this kind. Many mirasi rights were also given for free to brahmins or isolated for the assistance of religious institutions; other shares had simply been sold.

Francis Whyte Ellis observed that all the Paraiyars who resided in the areas where Mirasi rights reigned resided in a form of enslavement which he named 'villeinage'. The Paraiyans were at the bottom of the caste hierarchy, they were untouchables and kept in isolated areas outside the community at the So-called paraicheri. For the labour they completed, they were entitled to a variety of payments in grain and money. They were also compensated for the services they provided the town in a variety of lower positions, such as scavengers, watchmen, and messengers.

The pattern of slavery varied between different districts of the presidency, as did the sale of workers with land In South Arcot and Coimbatore, slaves could be sold to anyone. In Coimbatore, slavery during the early 19th century was predominantly debt based. Serfs were sold along with land in Trichonopoly. The collector of Tinnevelly reported in 1919 that there was no specific pattern for selling serfs with land or slaves alone. It was later observed that slaves were sold with land, a situation closer to what would be called serfdom. A similar pattern was observed in Tanjore, where the sale of slaves to other estates was rare. In Madurai, slavery was in gradual decline as early as 1819. Some slaves, after liberation joined the Presidency army as Sepoys. In the northern parts of the Presidency, like Masulipatnam and Ganjam, agrarian slavery was minimal. In the Telugu speaking districts, the slaves were of three kinds – servants to zamindars, servants to Muslims, and labourers attached to land.

== Distribution ==
The Law Commission report on slavery in 1841 contained the indicative figures on the number of slaves, based the numbers categorised as Pallars and Paraiyar. In South Arcot, the number of slaves was 17,000 in 1819, comprising less than 4% of the population. In Tanjore, the numbers were reported to be more numerous, while in Madurai it was less. The Tinnelvely collector reported 38% of the whole population as slaves. In Trichonopoly, the collector estimated 10,000 slaves in wet parts and 600 in dry parts of the district. In Nellore, the slave population was 14.6% of the total population in 1827 and 16% in 1930. Slaves formed 12.2% of the total population in 1930.

The Slave Trade Felony Act 1811, created a criminal penalty for the importation of slaves into British Territory. There were proposed regulations in 1823 to prevent child labour. In 1833, the Slavery Abolition Act received Royal Assent, though the Act did not "extend to any of the Territories in the Possession of the East India Company, or to the Island of Ceylon, or to the Island of Saint Helena." Act V of 1843 finally ended the slave trade in India, and this was incorporated in 1862 under the new Indian Penal Code.

== See also ==
- Slavery in India

== Bibliography ==
- British and Foreign Anti-slavery Society (1841). Slavery and the slave trade in British India: with notices of the existence of these evils in the islands of Ceylon, Malacca, and Penang, drawn from official documents. T. Ward, and to be had at the office of the British and Foreign Anti-Slavery society.
- Dharma, Kumar (1965). Land and Caste in South India: Agricultural Labor in the Madras Presidency During the Nineteenth Century. CUP Archive.
- Hjejle, Benedicte (1 January 1967). "Slavery and agricultural bondage in South India in the nineteenth century". Scandinavian Economic History Review. 15 (1–2). University of Michigan: 71–126. doi:10.1080/03585522.1967.10414353. ISSN 0358-5522.
