= Madras Presidency =

Administrative subdivision of India from 1652 to 1950

Coordinates: 13.08°N 80.27°E

Presidency of Fort St. George 1639–1937 Province of Madras 1937–1950
- 1639–1950
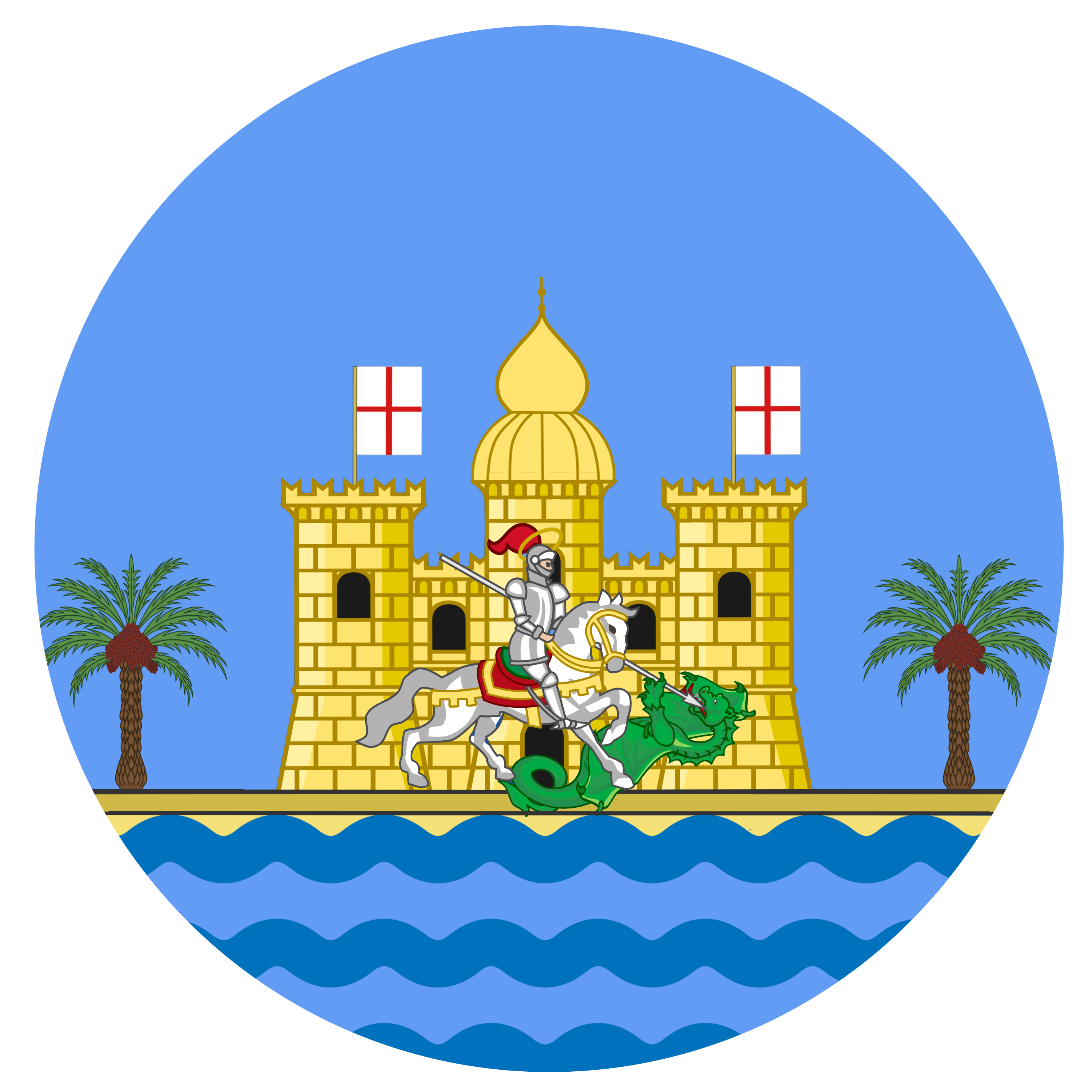
- Flag Badge
- Anthem: "God Save the King/Queen"
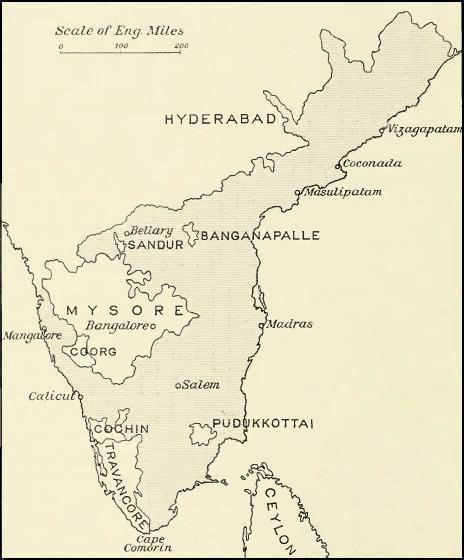
- The Madras Presidency in 1913 (Note: Ceylon is not included as it was separated in 1818)
- Capital: Madras; Ooty (summer capital)
- Largest city: Madras
- Official languages: English, Persian (till 1843)
- Recognized regional languages: Tamil; Telugu; Malayalam; Canarese
- Governor
  - 1785–1786 (first): George Macartney
  - 1948–1950 (last): Krishna Bhavsinghji
- Premier
  - 1920–1921 (first): A. Subbarayalu Reddiar
  - 1949–1950 (last): P. S. Kumaraswamy Raja
- Legislature: Madras Provincial Legislature
  - Upper house: Madras Legislative Council (1861–1950)
  - Lower house: Madras Legislative Assembly (1937–1950)
- Historical era: New Imperialism
  - Ceded by Vijaynagar governor: 1639
  - Madras becomes a province of India but retains title of "Presidency": 1833
  - Renamed as Province of Madras: 1937
  - Madras becomes a state of India and remained as State of Madras: 1950

Population
  - 1941 estimate: 49,341,810
Preceded by
1639: Vijayanagara Empire
1793: Kandy State
1855: Thanjavur State
Carnatic Sultanate
1801: Ramnad Kingdom
1801: Sivaganga Kingdom
Succeeded by
Madras State
- Today part of: India; Tamil Nadu; Andhra Pradesh; Kerala; Karnataka; Odisha; Telangana; Sri Lanka

The Madras Presidency, officially designated as the Presidency of Fort St. George until 1937 and later known as the Madras Province, was an administrative subdivision of the Company Raj, British Raj and its successor, the Dominion of India. At its greatest extent, the Presidency included most of South India, comprising all of present-day Tamil Nadu and Andhra Pradesh, along with parts of Kerala, Karnataka, Odisha, and Telangana, in addition to Sri Lanka, from 1793 to 1815. The city of Madras (present-day Chennai) served as the official and winter capital of the Presidency, while Udhagamandalam (present-day Ooty) served as its summer capital.

In 1639, the East India Company purchased the village of Madrasapatnam and one year later it established the Agency of Fort St. George, precursor of the Madras Presidency, although there had been Company factories at Machilipatnam and Armagaon since the very early 1600s. The agency was upgraded to a Presidency in 1652 before once more reverting to its previous status in 1655. In 1684, it was re-elevated to a Presidency and Elihu Yale was appointed as president. In 1785, under the provisions of Pitt's India Act, Madras became one of three presidencies established by the Company. By 1793, Ceylon was incorporated into the presidency but was later separated in 1815. Thereafter, the head of the area was styled "Governor" rather than "President" and became subordinate to the viceroy in Calcutta, with Madras' titulature that would persist until 1950. Judicial, legislative and executive powers rested with the Governor who was assisted by a Council whose constitution was modified by reforms enacted in 1861, 1909, 1919 and 1935. Regular elections were conducted in Madras up to the outbreak of the Second World War in 1938. By 1908, the province comprised twenty-two districts, each under a District Collector, and it was further sub-divided into taluks and firqas with villages making up the smallest unit of administration.

Following the Montagu–Chelmsford Reforms of 1917, Madras was the first presidency of India to implement a system of dyarchy, and thereafter its Governor ruled alongside a prime minister. In the early decades of the 20th century, many significant contributors to the Indian independence movement came from Madras. Madras was later admitted as Madras State, a state of the Indian Union at the inauguration of the Republic of India on 26 January 1950.

== History ==
=== Before the arrival of the English ===
The discovery of dolmens from this portion of the subcontinent shows inhabitation as early as the Stone Age. The first prominent rulers of the northern part of the future Presidency were the Tamil Pandya dynasty (230 BC – AD 102). Following the decline of the Pandyas and the Cholas, the country was conquered by a little known race of people called the Kalabhras. The country recovered under the subsequent Pallava dynasty and its civilisation attained a peak when the chola kings started acquiring vast places in Tamil Nadu during the 10th century. Following the conquest of Madurai by Malik Kafur in 1311, there was a brief lull when both culture and civilisation began to deteriorate. The Tamil and Telugu territories recovered under the Vijayanagar Empire, founded in 1336. Following the empire's demise, the country was split amongst numerous sultans, polygars and European trading companies. Between 1685 and 1947, a number of kings ruled the areas that became part of the Madras Presidency.

The southwestern portions of the presidency, which together constitute Tulu Nadu and Kerala, has a distinct history, language, and culture from its eastern counterparts.

=== Early English trading posts (1600–1639) ===
On 31 December 1600, Queen Elizabeth I of England (1533–1603) granted a group of English merchants a charter to establish a joint-stock company which became known as the East India Company. Subsequently, during the reign of King James I (1567–1625), Sir William Hawkins and Sir Thomas Roe were sent to negotiate with the Mughal Emperor Jahangir (1569–1627) to permit the establishment of trading factories in India on behalf of the company. The first of these were built at Surat on the west coast and at Masulipatinam on the country's eastern seaboard. Masulipatinam is thus the oldest English trading post on India's east coast, dating back to 1611. In 1625, another factory was established at Armagon, a few miles to the south, whereupon both the factories came under the supervision of an agency based at Machilipatnam. The English authorities decided to relocate these factories further south, due to a shortage of cotton cloth, the main trade item of the east coast at the time. The problem was compounded when the Sultan of Golconda started harassing the local officers. The East India Company's administrator Francis Day (1605–73) was sent south, and after negotiations with the Raja of Chandragiri, he obtained a land grant in 1639 to set up a factory in the village of Madraspatinam where the new Fort St George was built. An agency was created to govern the new settlement, and the factor Andrew Cogan of Masulipatinam was appointed as its first Agent. All the agencies along India's east coast were subordinated to the East India Company presidency of Bantam in Java. By 1641, Fort St George became the company's headquarters on the Coromandel Coast.

=== Agency of Fort St George (1640–1684) ===
Andrew Cogan was succeeded by Francis Day (1643–1644), Thomas Ivie (1644–1648) and Thomas Greenhill (1648–52 and 1655–58). At the end of Greenhill's term in 1652, Fort St George was elevated to a Presidency, independent of Bantam and under the leadership of the first president, Aaron Baker (1652–1655). However, in 1655 the status of the fort was downgraded to an Agency and made subject to the factory at Surat, until 1684. In 1658, control of all the factories in Bengal was given to Madras, when the English occupied the nearby village of Triplicane.

=== Expansion (1684–1801) ===
In 1684, Fort St George Black Town was where the 'natives' lived. The White Town was confined inside the walls of Fort St. George and the Black Town outside of it. The Black Town later came to be known as George Town. During this period, the presidency was significantly expanded and reached an extent which continued into the early 19th century. During the early years of the Madras Presidency, the English were repeatedly attacked by the Mughals, the Marathas and the Nawabs of Golkonda and the Carnatic region. In September 1784, by Pitt's India Act, passed by the Parliament of Great Britain to unify and regulate the administration of the territories of the East India Company, the President of Madras was made subordinate to the Governor-General of India based in Calcutta. In September 1746, Fort St George was captured by the French, who ruled Madras as a part of French India until 1749, when Madras was handed back to the British under the terms of the Treaty of Aix-la-Chappelle of the previous year.

In 1801, the Nawab of Arcot, Azim-ud-Daula signed the Carnatic Treaty bringing the Carnatic region under British rule. In return, Azim-ud-Daula was entitled to one-fifth of the total revenue of the state and the honour of a 21-gun salute.

=== During the Company rule (1801–1858) ===
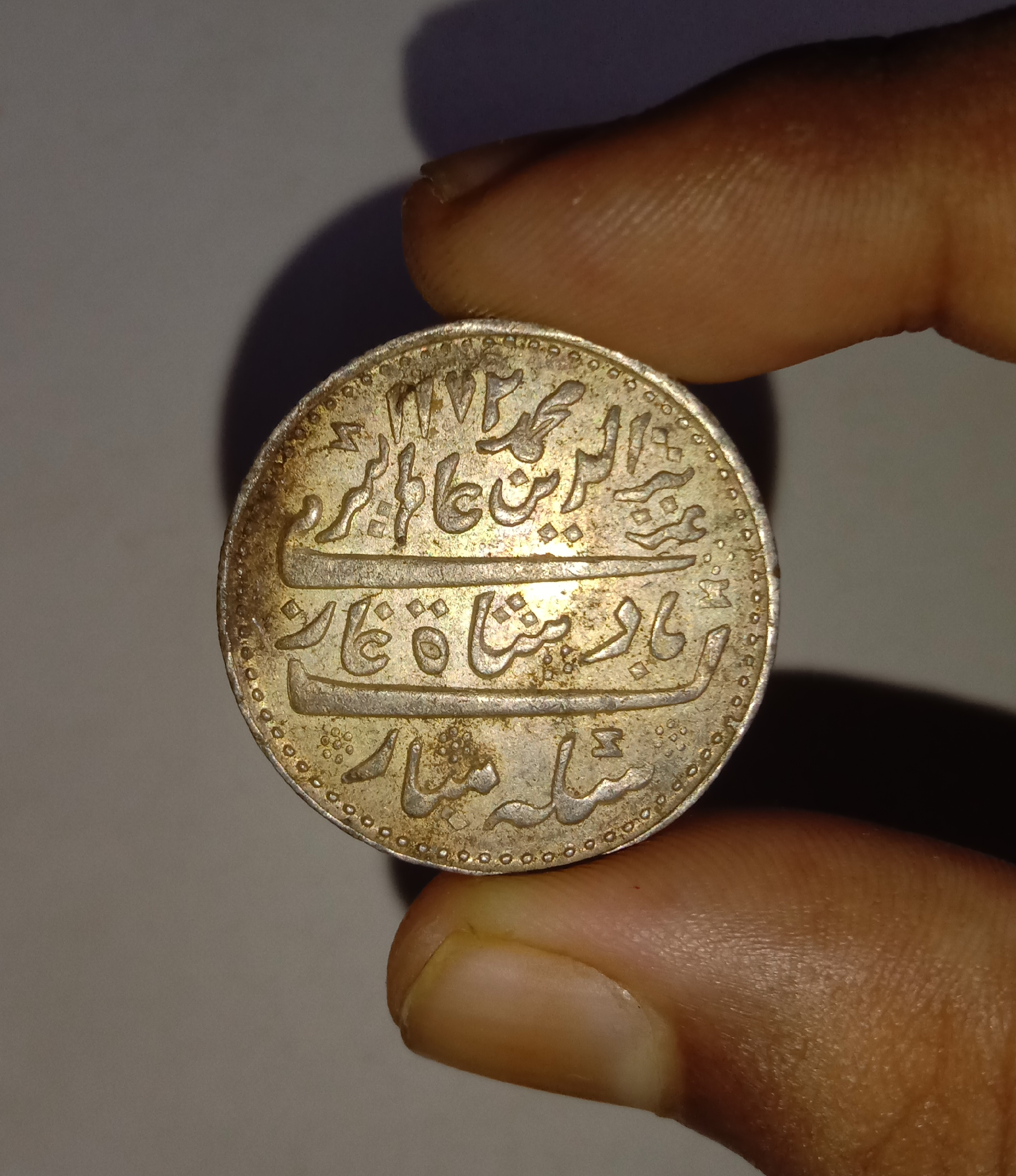
Silver Rupee of the Madras Presidency, minted in Arkat, struck in the name of Mughal emperor Alamgir II.

From 1801 until 1858, Madras was a part of British India and was ruled by the British East India Company. The last quarter of the 18th century was a period of rapid expansion. Successful wars against Tipu Sultan (1782–99), Maruthu Pandyar, Velu Thampi, and Polygars added vast areas of land and contributed to the exponential growth of the presidency. The system of subsidiary alliances originated by Lord Wellesley as Governor-General of India (1798–1805) also brought many princely states into the area militarily subordinate to the Governor of Fort St George. The largest kingdom of the hill-tract region of Visakhapatanam was Jeypore and in 1777 it was conquered by Captain Matthews. The hill tracts of Ganjam and Visakhapatnam were the last places to be annexed by the British.

The period also witnessed a number of rebellions starting with the 1806 Vellore Mutiny. The rebellion of Velu Thambi and Paliath Achan and the Poligar Wars were other notable insurrections against the British rule, but the Madras Presidency remained relatively undisturbed by the Sepoy Mutiny of 1857.

The Madras Presidency annexed the Kingdom of Mysore in 1831 on allegations of maladministration and restored it to Chamaraja Wodeyar (1881–94), the grandson and heir of the deposed Krishnaraja Wodeyar III (1799–1868) in 1881. Thanjavur was annexed in 1855, following the death of Shivaji II (1832–1855) who left no male heir.

=== British Raj (1858–1947) ===
In 1858, under the terms of Queen's Proclamation issued by Queen Victoria, the Madras Presidency, along with the rest of British India, came under the direct rule of the British crown. During the period of governor Lord Harris (1854–1859), measures were taken to improve education and increase representation of Indians in the administration. Legislative powers were given to the Governor's council under the Indian Councils Act 1861. The council was reformed and expanded under the Indian Councils Act 1892, the Indian Councils Act 1909, the Government of India Act 1919, and the Government of India Act 1935. V. Sadagopacharlu (1861–63) was the first Indian to be appointed to the council. The legal profession was specially prized by the newly emerging corpus of educated Indians. The first Indian judge to be appointed was C. V. Runganada Sastri; in 1877, T. Muthuswamy Iyer became the first Indian judge of the Madras High Court despite strong opposition from the Anglo-Indian media. He also acted as the Chief Justice of the Madras High Court for a few months in 1893, thereby becoming the first Indian to hold the post. In 1899, V. Bhashyam Aiyangar became the first Indian to be appointed Advocate-General of the Madras Presidency. A number of roads, railways, dams and canals were constructed during this period.

Two large famines occurred in Madras during this period, the Great Famine of 1876–78 and the Indian famine of 1896–97. As a result of the first, the population of the presidency fell for the first time from 31.2 million in 1871 to 30.8 million in 1881. These famines and alleged partiality shown by the government in handling the Chingleput Ryots' Case and the Salem riots trial caused discontent among the population.

=== Indian Independence movement ===
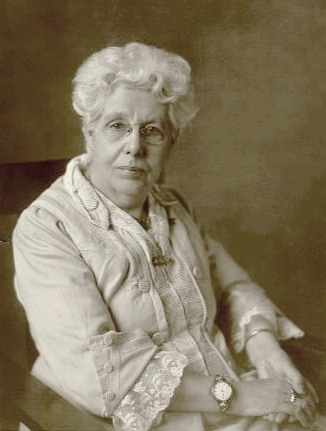
Annie Besant in 1922

A strong sense of national awakening emerged in the Madras Presidency in the later half of the 19th century. The first political organisation in the province, the Madras Native Association, was established by Gazulu Lakshminarasu Chetty on 26 February 1852. However, the organisation did not last long. The Madras Native Association was followed by the Madras Mahajana Sabha which was started on 16 May 1884. Of the 72 delegates who participated in the first session of the Indian National Congress at Bombay in December 1885, 22 hailed from the Madras Presidency. Most of the delegates were members of the Madras Mahajana Sabha. The third session of the Indian National Congress was held in Madras in December 1887 and was a huge success attended by 362 delegates from the province. Subsequent sessions of the Indian National Congress took place in Madras in 1894, 1898, 1903 1908, 1914 and 1927.

Madam Blavatsky and Colonel H. S. Olcott moved the headquarters of the Theosophical Society to Adyar in 1882. The society's most prominent figure was Annie Besant, who founded the Home Rule League in 1916. The Home Rule Movement was organised from Madras and found extensive support in the Province. Nationalistic newspapers such as The Hindu, the Swadesamitran and the Mathrubhumi actively endorsed the campaign for independence. India's first trade union was established in Madras in 1918 by V. Kalyanasundaram and B. P. Wadia.

=== Dyarchy (1920–37) ===
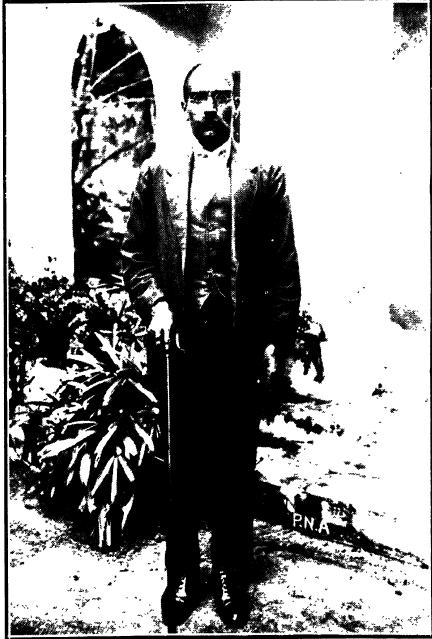
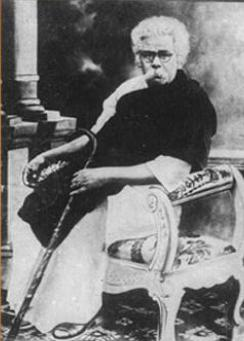
The non-Brahmin movement was started by C. Natesa Mudaliar (left) who founded the Justice Party in 1916 and Periyar E. V. Ramasamy (right), who founded the Self-Respect Movement and took over the Justice party in 1944

A dyarchy was created in Madras Presidency in 1920 as per the Montagu–Chelmsford Reforms with provisions made for elections in the presidency. Democratically elected governments would henceforth share power with the Governor's autocratic establishment. Following the first elections held in November 1920, the Justice Party, an organisation established in 1916 to campaign for increased representation of non-Brahmins in the administration, against the Mylapore clique, came to power. A. Subbarayalu Reddiar became the first Chief Minister of the Madras Presidency but resigned soon after due to declining health and was replaced by P. Ramarayaningar, Minister of Local Self-Government and Public Health, popularly known as the Raja of Panagal. The party split in late 1923 when C. R. Reddy resigned from primary membership and formed a splinter group allied with the opposition Swarajists. A motion of no-confidence was proposed against Ramarayaningar's government on 27 November 1923, but was defeated 65–44. Ramarayaningar remained in power until November 1926. The enactment in August 1921 of the first communal Government Order (G.O. No. 613), which introduced caste-based communal reservations in government jobs, remains one of the high points of his rule. In the following elections of 1926 the Justice Party lost. However, as no party was able to obtain a clear majority, the Governor, Lord Goschen, set up a cross-party government under the leadership of P. Subbarayan and nominated its supporting members. In the election of 1930, the Justice Party was victorious, and P. Munuswamy Naidu became Chief Minister. The exclusion of Zamindars from the Ministry split the Justice Party once again. Fearing a no-confidence motion against him, Munuswamy Naidu resigned in November 1932 and the Raja of Bobbili was appointed Chief Minister in his place. The Justice Party eventually lost the 1937 elections to the Indian National Congress, and Chakravarti Rajagopalachari became Chief Minister of Madras Presidency.

During the 1920s and 1930s, an Anti-Brahmin movement emerged in the Madras Presidency. It was launched by E. V. Ramaswamy who, unhappy with the principles and policies of the Brahmin leadership of the provincial Congress, left the party to form the Self-Respect Movement. Periyar, as he was alternatively known, criticised Brahmins, Hinduism, and Hindu superstitions in periodicals and newspapers such as Viduthalai and Justice. He also participated in the Vaikom Satyagraha, which campaigned for the right of untouchables in Travancore to enter temples.

=== Last days of British rule ===
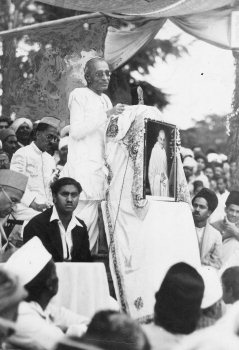
The Indian National Congress came to power for the first time in 1937 with Chakravarti Rajagopalachari (pictured at a rally) as its Chief Minister

In 1937, the Indian National Congress was elected to power in the Presidency of Madras for the first time. Chakravarti Rajagopalachari was the first chief minister of the presidency to come from the Congress party. He successfully enacted the Temple Entry Authorization and Indemnity Act and introduced both prohibition and sales taxes in the Madras Presidency. His rule is largely remembered for the use of Hindi being made compulsory in educational institutions, a measure which made him highly unpopular as a politician and sparked widespread Anti-Hindi agitations, which led to violence in some places. Over 1,200 men, women, and children were jailed for their participation in such Anti-Hindi agitations while Thalamuthu and Natarasan died during the protests. In 1940, ministers of the Congress party resigned in protest over the Government of India's declaration of war on Germany without their consent. The Governor of Madras, Sir Arthur Hope, took over the administration and the unpopular law was eventually repealed by him on 21 February 1940.

Most of the Congress leadership and erstwhile ministers were arrested in 1942, as a result of their participation in the Quit India movement. In 1944, Periyar renamed the Justice Party as Dravidar Kazhagam and withdrew it from electoral politics. After the end of the Second World War, the Indian National Congress re-entered politics, and in the absence of any serious opposition it easily won the 1946 election. Tanguturi Prakasam was then elected as Chief Minister with the support of Kamaraj and served for eleven months.

=== Post Independence ===
Prakasam was succeeded by O. P. Ramaswamy Reddiyar, who was the chief Minister of the province when India gained independence on 15 August 1947. The Madras Presidency became the Madras State in after the enactment of Constitution of India on 26 January 1950.

== Geography ==
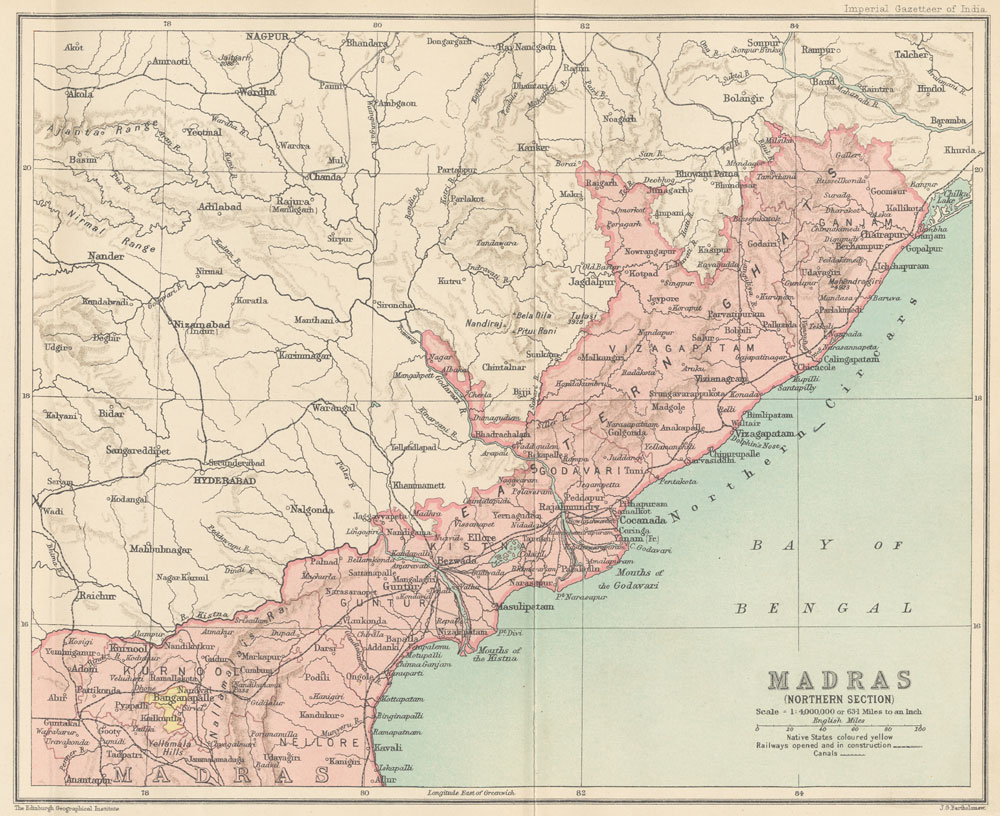
Madras province (North), 1909

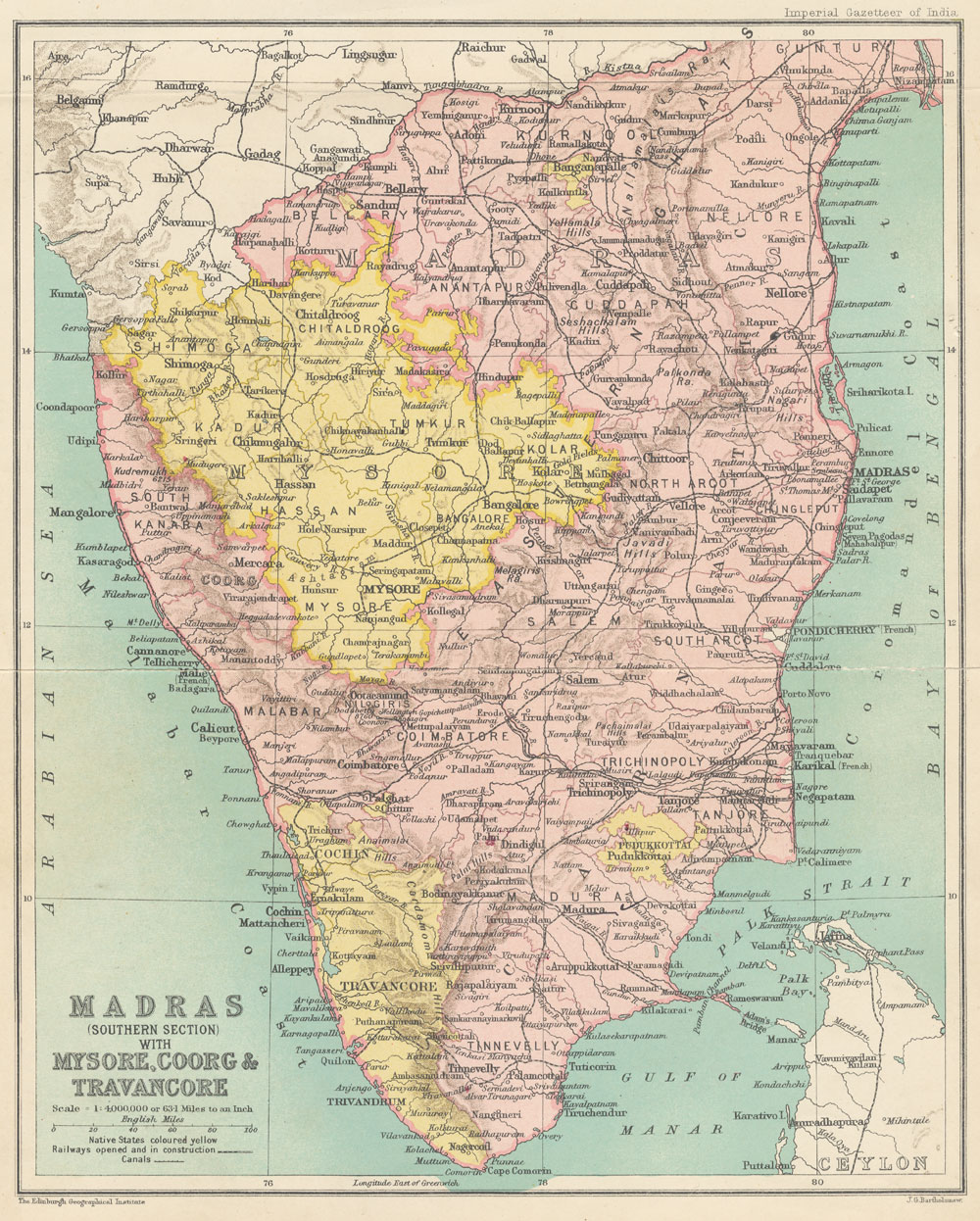
Madras province (South), 1909

At its greatest extent, the Madras Presidency included much of southern India. Present-day territories that were once part of the presidency are the whole Indian State of Andhra Pradesh excluding the region of Banaganapalle Princely State, the Tondai Nadu, Kongu Nadu, Chola Nadu and part of Pandya Nadu regions of Tamil Nadu, the Malabar region of North Kerala, the Lakshadweep Islands, the Ganjam, Gajapati, Rayagada, Koraput, Nabarangapur and Malkangiri districts of southern Odisha and the Bellary and South Canara districts of Karnataka and the parts of Jayashankar Bhupalapalli, Bhadradri Kothagudem districts of Telangana. The presidency had its winter capital at Madras and summer capital at Ootacamund.

== Demographics ==
Historical population
Year	Pop.	±%
1871	31,597,872	—
1881	31,170,631	−1.4%
1891	35,630,440	+14.3%
1901	38,199,162	+7.2%

In 1822, the Madras Presidency underwent its first census, which returned a population of 13,476,923. A second census conducted between 1836 and 1837 recorded a population of 13,967,395, an increase of only 490,472 over 15 years. The first quinquennial population enumeration took place from 1851 until 1852. It returned a population of 22,031,697. Subsequent enumerations were made in 1851–52, 1856–57, 1861–62, and 1866–67. The population of Madras Presidency was tallied at 22,857,855, 24,656,509 in 1861–62 and 26,539,052 in 1866–67. The first organised census of India was conducted in 1871 and returned a population of 31,220,973 for the Madras Presidency. Since then, a census has been conducted once every ten years. The last census of British India held in 1941 counted a population of 49,341,810 for the Madras Presidency.

=== Languages ===
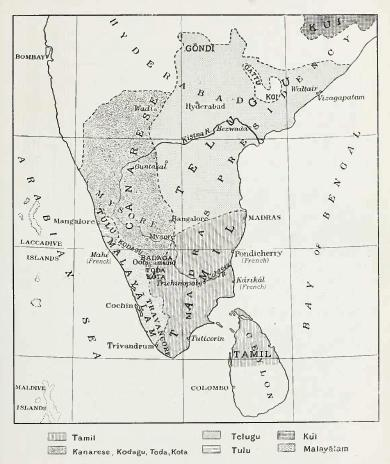
Linguistic map of the Madras Presidency

The official languages of the province were Hindustani and English and by 1940 after the Hindustani imposition protests, Tamil was recognised as an official language along with Hindustani and English. Tamil was the most spoken language while Telugu, Malayalam, Kannada, Odia, Tulu and English languages were significant minorities. Tamil was spoken in the southern districts of the presidency from a few miles north of Madras city as far west as the Nilgiri Mountains and Western Ghats. Telugu was spoken in the districts to the north of Madras city and to the eastern parts of Bellary and Anantapur districts. In the district of South Kanara, the western part of Bellary and Anantapur districts, Kannada was spoken. Malayalam was spoken in the districts of Malabar and southern parts of South Kanara and the princely states of Travancore and Cochin, while Tulu was spoken in South Canara. Odia was spoken in the districts of then Ganjam and Vizagapatam. English was spoken by the Anglo-Indians and Eurasians. Hindustani was spoken by the North Indian immigrants in Madras and South Canara.

According to the 1871 census, there were 14,715,000 people who spoke Tamil, 11,610,000 people who spoke Telugu, 2,324,000 people who spoke Malayalam, 1,699,000 spoke Canarese or Kannada, 640,000 people spoke Oriya and 29,400 people spoke Tulu. The 1901 census returned 15,182,957 speakers of Tamil, 14,276,509 Telugu-speakers, 2,861,297 speakers of Malayalam, 1,518,579 were speakers of Kannada, 1,809,314 spoke Oriya, 880,145 spoke Hindustani and 1,680,635 spoke other languages. At the time of Indian independence, Tamil and Telugu speakers made up over 78% of the total population of the presidency, with Kannada, Malayalam and Tulu speakers making up the rest.

=== Religion ===
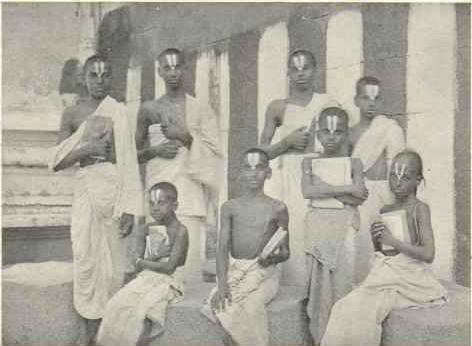
Vaishnavite Brahmin students at a Gurukulam in Tanjore, c. 1909

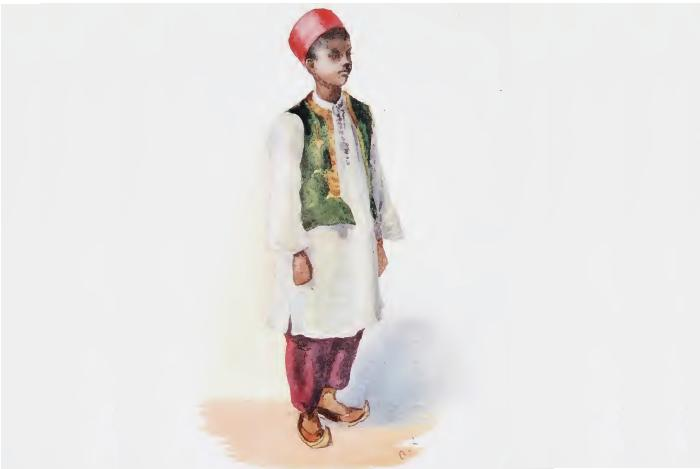
Muslim (called in English at the time as Muhammadan) boy, c. 1914

In 1901, the population breakdown was: Hindus (37,026,471), Muslims (2,732,931), and Christians (1,934,480). By the time of India's independence in 1947, Madras had an estimated population of 49,799,822 Hindus, 3,896,452 Muslims and 2,047,478 Christians

Hinduism was the predominant religion in the presidency and practised by around 88% of the population. The main Hindu denominations were Saivite, Vaishnavite and Lingayat. Among the Brahmins, the Smartha doctrine was quite popular. Worship of village gods was strong in the southern districts of the presidency while the mathas at Kanchi, Sringeri and Ahobilam were regarded as the centres of the Hindu faith. Of the Hindu temples, the largest and most important were the Venkateswara temple at Thirupathi, the Brihadeeswarar temple at Tanjore, the Meenakshi Amman temple at Madurai, the Ranganathaswamy temple at Srirangam, the Krishna temple at Udupi and the Padmanabhaswamy temple in the princely state of Travancore. Islam was brought to the southern part of India by Arab traders although most converts were made from the 14th century onwards, when Malik Kafur conquered Madurai. Nagore was the holiest city for the Muslims of the Madras Presidency. The presidency also had one of the oldest Christian populations in India. Branches of the Syrian church, contrary to historical evidence, are popularly believed to have been instituted by St. Thomas, an apostle of Jesus Christ who visited the Malabar coast in 52 AD Christians were mainly concentrated in the Tinnevely and Malabar districts of Madras Presidency with native Christians forming over one–quarter of the total population of the princely state of Travancore. Hill tribes of the Nilgiris, Palani and Ganjam regions such as the Todas, Badagas, Kotas, Yerukalas and the Khonds, worshiped tribal gods and were often classified as Hindus. In 1921, the Raja of Panagal's government passed the Hindu Religious Endowments Bill that established government-controlled trusts in the Madras Presidency to manage Hindu temples and prevent potential misuse of their funds. Until the early years of the 20th century, certain Hindu communities were not allowed inside Hindu temples. However, along with the emancipation of Indian women and removal of social evils, untouchability was slowly eradicated through legislation and social reform. The Raja of Bobbili who served the Premier from 1932 to 1936, appointed untouchables to temple administration boards all over the presidency and reformed the administration of the Tirumala Tirupathi Devasthanams, the trust which manages the Hindu temple at Tirupathi. In 1939, the Congress government of C. Rajagopalachari introduced the Temple Entry Authorization and Indemnity Act which removed all restrictions on untouchables entering Hindu temples. Chithira Thirunal of Travancore had issued a similar had earlier introduced similar legislation, the Temple Entry Proclamation at the advice of his Diwan, Sir C. P. Ramaswamy Ayyar, in 1937. The provincial government under Ramasamy Reddy passed the Madras Temple Entry Authorization Act on 11 May 1947, which was intended to give Dalits and other prohibited Hindus full and complete rights to enter Hindu temples. The Madras Devadasis (Prevention of Dedication) Act which gave Devadasi's the legal right to Marry and also making it illegal to dedicate girls to Hindu temples was passed on 9 October 1947.

== Administration ==
The East India Company Act 1784 (24 Geo. 3. Sess. 2. c. 25) created an executive council with legislative powers to assist the Governor. The council initially consisted of four members, two of whom were from the Indian civil service or covenanted civil service and the third, an Indian of distinction. The fourth was the commander-in-chief of the Madras Army. The council was reduced to three members when the Madras Army was abolished in 1895. The legislative powers of this council were withdrawn as per the Government of India Act 1833 and it was reduced to the status of a mere advisory body. However, these powers were restored as per Indian Councils Act 1861. The council was expanded from time to time through the inclusion of official and non-official members and served as the main legislative body till 1935, when a legislative assembly of a more representative nature was created and legislative powers were transferred to the assembly. On India's independence on 15 August 1947, the three-member Governor's executive council was abolished.

The origins of Madras Presidency lay in the village of Madraspatnam which was obtained in 1640. This was followed by Fort St David which was acquired in 1690. Chingleput district, known as the "jaghire" of Chingleput, obtained in 1763, was the first district in the Madras Presidency. Salem and Malabar districts were obtained from Tipu Sultan in 1792 as per the Treaty of Seringapatam and Coimbatore and Kanara districts after the Fourth Mysore War in 1799. The territories of the Thanjavur Maratha kingdom were constituted as a separate district in 1799. In 1800, the districts of Bellary and Cuddapah were created out of the territory ceded by the Nizam of Hyderabad. In 1801, the districts of North Arcot, South Arcot, Nellore, Trichinopoly, Madura and Tinnevely were created out of the territories of the erstwhile Carnatic kingdom. Trichinopoly district was made a sub-division of Tanjore district in June 1805 and remained so till August 1808 when its status as a separate district was restored. The districts of Rajahmundry (Rajamahendravaram), Masulipatnam and Guntur were created in 1823. These three districts were reorganised in 1859 into two – the Godavari and Krishna districts. Godavari district was further bifurcated into East and West Godavari districts in 1925. The Kurnool kingdom was annexed in 1839 and was constituted as a separate district of the Madras Presidency. For administrative convenience, the district of Kanara was split into North and South Kanara in 1859. North Kanara was transferred to Bombay Presidency in 1862. Between 1859–60 and 1870, the districts of Madras and Chingleput were put together into a single district. A separate Nilgiris district was carved out of Coimbatore district in 1868. As of 1908, Madras Presidency was made up of 24 districts each administered by a District Collector who was from the Indian Civil Service. The districts were sometimes sub-divided into divisions each under a Deputy Collector. The divisions were further sub-divided into taluks and union panchayats or village committees. Agencies were sometimes created in British India out of volatile, rebellion-prone areas of the presidency. The two important agencies in the Madras Presidency were the Vizagapatam Hill Tracts Agency which was subject to the District Collector of Vizagapatam and the Ganjam Hill Tracts Agency subject to the District Collector of Ganjam. In 1936, the districts of Ganjam and Vizagapatam (including the Vizagapatam and the Ganjam agencies) were partitioned between Madras and the newly created province of Orissa.

There were five princely states subordinate to the Madras government. They were Banganapalle, Cochin, Pudukkottai, Sandur, and Travancore. All these states had a considerable degree of internal autonomy. However, their foreign policy was completely controlled by a Resident who represented the Governor of Fort St George. In case of Banganapalle, the Resident was the District Collector of Kurnool, while the District Collector of Bellary was the Resident of Sandur. The Resident of Pudukkottai from 1800 to 1840 and 1865 to 1873, was the District Collector of Tanjore, from 1840 to 1865, the District Collector of Madura and from 1873 to 1947, the District Collector of Trichinopoly.

== Armed forces ==
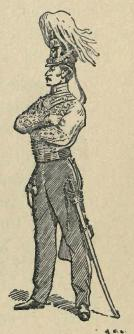
A British officer in the Madras Light Cavalry

The English East India Company was first permitted to set up its own garrison in 1665 to guard its settlements. Notable amongst the early operations of the company's forces were the defence of the city from Mughal and Maratha invaders and from the incursions of the Nawab of Carnatic. In 1713, the Madras forces under Lieutenant John de Morgan distinguished themselves in the siege of Fort St David and in putting down Richard Raworth's Rebellion.

When Joseph François Dupleix, the Governor of French India, began to raise native battalions in 1748, the British of Madras followed suit and established the Madras Regiment. Though native regiments were subsequently established by the British in other parts of India, the distances that separated the three presidencies resulted in each force developing divergent principles and organisations. The first reorganisation of the army took place in 1795 when the Madras army was reconstituted into the following units:

- European Infantry – Two battalions of ten companies
- Artillery – Two European battalions of five companies each, with fifteen companies of lascars
- Native Cavalry – Four regiments
- Native Infantry – Eleven regiments of two battalions

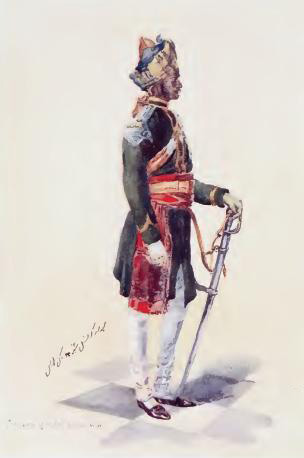
A Jemadar of the 20th Deccan Horse

In 1824, a second reorganisation took place, whereupon the double battalions were abolished and the existing battalions were renumbered. The Madras Army at the time consisted of one European and one native brigade of horse artillery, three battalions of foot artillery of four companies each, with four companies of lascars attached, three regiments of light cavalry, two corps of pioneers, two battalions of European infantry, 52 battalions of native infantry and three local battalions.

Between 1748 and 1895, as with the Bengal and Bombay armies, the Madras Army had its own Commander-in-Chief who was subordinate to the president, and later to the Governor of Madras. By custom, the Commander-in-chief of the Madras Army was a member of the Governor's Executive Council. The army's troops participated in the conquest of Manila in 1762, the 1795 expeditions against Ceylon and the Dutch as well as the conquest of the Spice Islands in the same year. They also took part in expeditions against Mauritius (1810), Java (1811), the wars against Tipu Sultan and the Carnatic Wars of the 18th century, the British attack on Cuttack during the Second Anglo-Maratha War, the Siege of Lucknow during the Indian Mutiny, and the invasion of Upper Burma during the Third Anglo-Burmese War.

The 1857 Mutiny, which quickly led to drastic changes in the Bengal and Bombay armies, had no effect on the Madras Army. In 1895, the presidency armies were finally merged and the Madras regiments came under the direct control of the Commander-in-chief of British India.

in 1890 three madras infantry battalions were accordingly reconstituted, at least for a time, by tapping two south Indian communities which had not yet provided many recruits to the Indian army-the Mappilas and the coorgs, the government of madras was sceptical, and agreed to the formation of two Mappila battalions only on condition they were deployed outside Malabar. Raised in 1900, the new regiments were complete failure, they soon dwindled to 600 men 'quite useless for service'. ref:The Sepoy and the Raj: The Indian Army, 1860–1940

== Land tenure ==
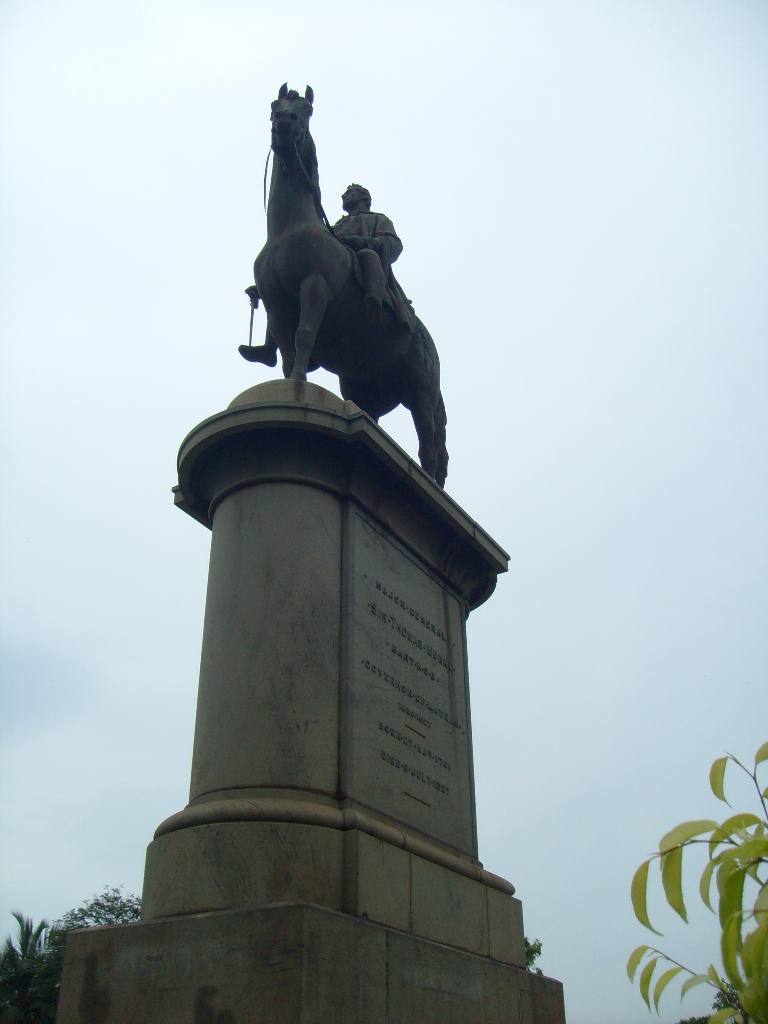
Statue of Sir Thomas Munro who introduced the "Ryotwari System" in the Madras Presidency

Revenue from land rental as well as an income tax based on the tenant's net profits from their land was the presidency's main source of income.

In ancient times, land appears to have been held in common with an individual unable to sell it without the consent of the other owners, who in most cases were members of the same community. Prior to the arrival of the British, the concept of individual proprietorship of land had already emerged along India's west coast such that the new administration's land revenue system was not markedly different from that of its predecessor. Nevertheless, landlords never sold land without the consent of other members of the community. This communistic property rights system was known as kaniachi among the Vellalars, swastium among the Brahmins and mirasi among Muslims and Christians. In the Tanjore district, all mirasi in the village were vested in a single individual who was called the Ekabhogam. The mirasidars were required to donate a certain amount of money known as mirei to the village administration. They also paid a specified sum to the Government. In return, the mirasidars demanded non-interference by the government in the internal affairs of the villages.

The proprietary system was entirely different in the district of Malabar and the states of Cochin and Travancore where communal ownership of land did not exist. Instead, land was individual property mostly owned by the landowning gentry, to wit the Namboodiri and Nair people, who did not have to pay land-tax and held extensive freeholds of land rented to tenants for agricultural purposes. In return, the Nairs supplied the king with fighting men in times of war while the Namboodhiris managed the upkeep of Hindu temples. These landlords were somewhat self-sufficient and had their own police and judicial systems such that the personal expenses of the Raja were minimal. However, landlords lost their exemption from the taxes on land if they disposed of it meaning that mortgage of land was more common than sale. Individual proprietorship of land was also common in the Telugu-speaking areas of the presidency. The chieftains of the Telugu-speaking districts had more or less maintained an independent existence for a long time, furnishing the sovereign with armies and equipment in times of war. In return, their right to revenues from land remained unmolested. During the time of the British, most of land in the northern districts of the presidency were parcelled out among these petty "Rajahs".

Islamic invasions caused minor changes in the land proprietorship system when taxes on Hindu land owners were raised and private ownership of property came down.

When the British took over administration, the centuries-old system of land proprietorship was left intact. The new rulers appointed middlemen to collect revenue for lands which were not under the control of local zamindars. In most cases, these go-betweens ignored the welfare of the farmers and exploited them to the full. A Board of Revenue was established in 1786 to solve the issue but to no avail. At the same time, the zamindari settlement established in Bengal by Lord Cornwallis proved highly successful and was later implemented in the Madras Presidency from 1799 onwards.

However, the Permanent Settlement was not as successful as it had been in Bengal. When the Company did not reach the expected profit levels, a new system known as the "Village Settlement" was implemented between 1804 and 1814 in the districts of Tinnevely, Trichinopoly, Coimbatore, North Arcot and South Arcot. This involved the leasing of land to the principal cultivators, who in turn leased the land to ryots, or peasant farmers. However, as a village settlement had few differences compared to a permanent settlement, it was eventually discarded. In its place came the "Ryotwari Settlement" implemented by Sir Thomas Munro between 1820 and 1827. According to the new system, land was handed over directly to the ryots who paid their rent directly to the government. The land was assessed and paid revenue fixed by the Government This system had a number of advantages as well as disadvantages for the ryots. In 1833, Lord William Bentinck implemented a new system called the "Mahalwari" or village system under which landlords as well as ryots entered into a contract with the Government.

By the early 20th century, the greater part of the land was held by ryots who paid rent directly to the Government. Zamindari estates occupied about 26 million acres (110,000 km^{2}), more than one-quarter of the whole presidency. The peshkash, or tribute, payable to the government in perpetuity was about £330,000 a year. Inams, revenue-free or quit-rent grants of lands made for religious endowments or for services rendered to the state, occupied an aggregate area of nearly 8 million acres (32,000 km^{2}). In 1945–46, there were 20,945,456 acres (84,763.25 km^{2}) of Zamindari estates yielding revenues of ₹9,783,167 and 58,904,798 acres (238,379.26 km^{2}) of ryotwari lands which produced ₹72,665,330. Madras had forest coverage of 15,782 square miles (40,880 km^{2}).

The Land Estates Act of 1908 was passed by the Madras Government in order to protect cultivators in Zamindaris from exploitation. Under the act, ryots were made permanent occupants of the land. However, far from protecting the ryots, the legislation proved to be detrimental to the interests of the cultivators in the Oriya-speaking northern districts of the presidency who were the intended beneficiaries, as it tied the cultivator to his land and landlord with the chains of eternal serfdom. In 1933, an amendment to the Act was introduced by the Raja of Bobbili to curb the rights of Zamindars and safeguard the cultivators from exploitation. This act was passed in the legislative council despite strong opposition from the Zamindars.

== Agriculture and irrigation ==
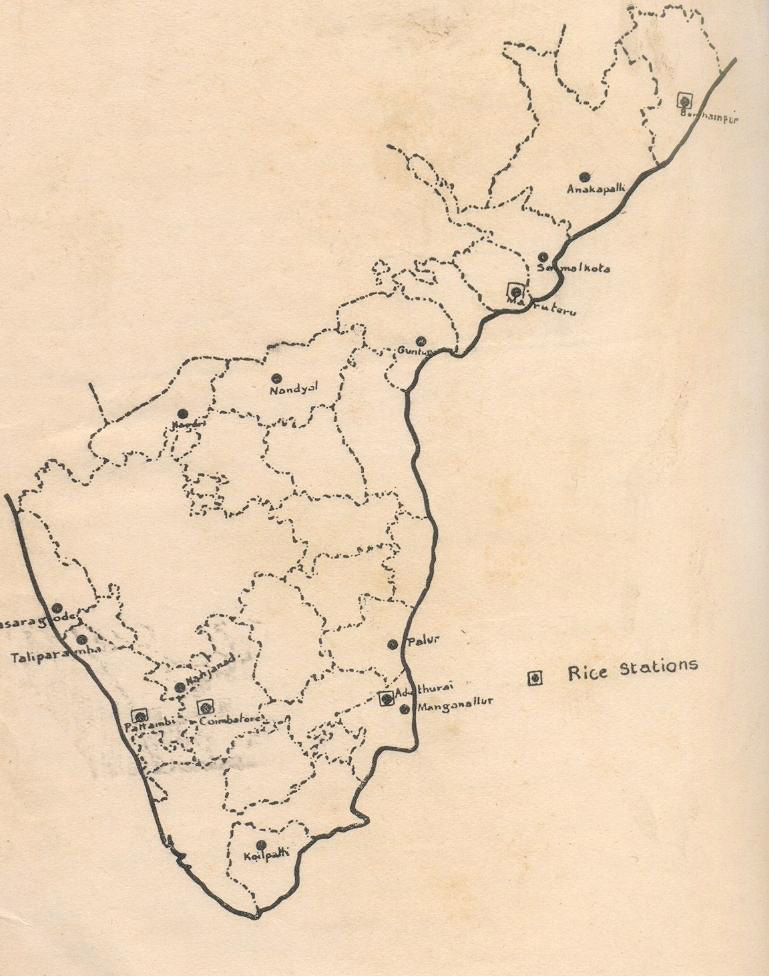
A 1936 map of rice stations in Madras Presidency

Almost 71% of the population of Madras Presidency was engaged in agriculture with the agricultural year usually commencing on 1 July. Crops cultivated in the Madras Presidency included cereals such as rice, corn, kambhu (Indian millet) and ragi as well as vegetables including brinjal, sweet potato, ladies' fingers, beans, onions, garlic and spices such as chilli, pepper and ginger along with vegetable oils made from castor beans and peanuts. Fruits cultivated included lime, banana jackfruit, cashew nuts, mangos, custard apples and papayas. In addition, cabbages, cauliflowers, pomelos, peaches, betel pepper, niger seed and millet were introduced from Asia, Africa or Europe, while grapes were introduced from Australia. The total cultivated area used for food crops was 80% and for cash crops, 15%. Of the gross area, rice occupied 26.4 per cent; kambhu, 10 per cent; ragi, 5.4 per cent and Cholam, 13.8 per cent. Cotton occupied 1,740,000 acres (7,000 km^{2}), oilseeds, 2.08 million, spices,0.4 million and indigo, 0.2 million. In 1898, Madras produced 7.47 million tons of food grains from 21,570,000 acres (87,300 km^{2}) of crops grown on 19,300,000 acres (78,000 km^{2}) of ryotwari and inam lands, which supported a population of 28 million. The rice yield was 7 to 10 cwt. per acre, the cholam yields were 3.5 to 6.25 cwt. per acre, khambu, 3.25 to 5 cwt. per acre and ragi, 4.25 to 5 cwt. per acre. The average gross turnout for food crops was 6.93 cwt. per acre.

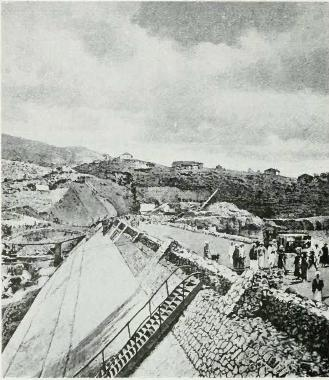
The Mullaperiyar Dam was constructed across the Periyar river for power generation

Irrigation along the east coast is carried out mostly by means of dams across rivers, lakes and irrigation tanks. The main source of water for agriculture in the Coimbatore district were tanks.

The Land Improvement and Agriculturists Loan Act passed in 1884 provided funds for the construction of wells and their utilisation in reclamation projects. In the early part of the 20th century, the Madras government established the Pumping and Boring Department to drill boreholes with electric pumps. The Mettur Dam, the Periyar Project, the Cudappah-Kurnool canal and the Rushikulya Project were the biggest irrigation projects launched by the Madras Government. Constructed below the Hogenakkal Falls on the Madras-Mysore border in 1934, the Mettur Dam supplied water to the western districts of the presidency. The Periyar Dam (now known as the Mullaperiyar Dam) was constructed across the Periyar river in Travancore, near the border. This project diverted the waters of the Periyar river to the Vaigai River basin in order to irrigate the arid lands to the east of the Western Ghats. Similarly, the Rushikulya Project was launched to utilise the waters of the Rushikulya river in Ganjam. Under the scheme over 142,000 acres (570 km^{2}) of land were brought under irrigation. The British also constructed a number of dams and canals for irrigation. An upper dam was constructed across the Kollidam river near Srirangam island. The Dowlaishwaram dam across the Godavari river, the Gunnavaram aqueduct across the Vaineteyam Godavari, the Kurnool-Cuddapah canal and the Krishna dam are examples of major irrigation works carried out by the British. In 1946–47, the total area under irrigation was 9,736,974 acres (39,404.14 km^{2}) acres which yielded a return of 6.94% on capital outlay.

== Trade, industry and commerce ==
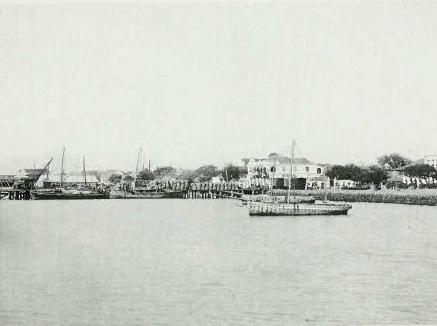
The port of Tuticorin

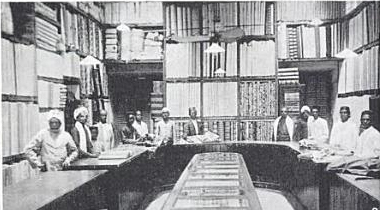
Textile showroom of M. V. Cunniah Chetty and Sons, circa 1914

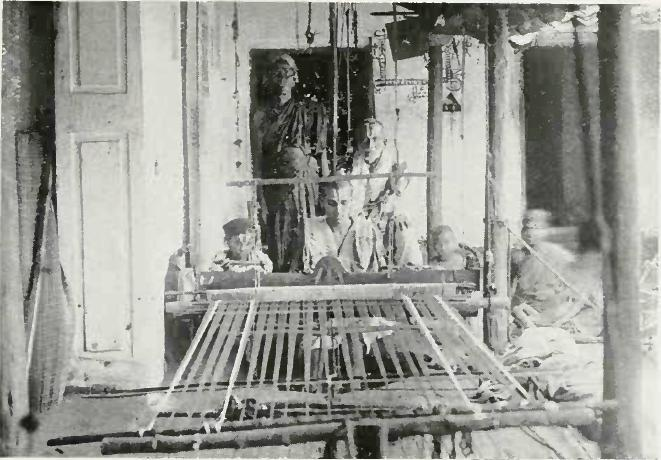
Weaving on Handlooms, c. 1913

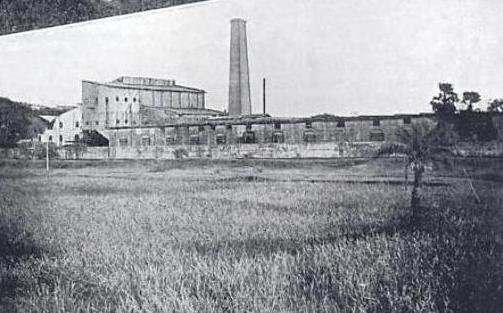
Parry & Co. sugar refineries at Samalkota, c. 1914

Workshops of the Madras Automobiles Ltd., c. 1904

The trade of the Madras Presidency comprised that of both the presidency with other Provinces and its overseas trade. External trade made up 93 per cent of the total with internal trade making up the remainder. Foreign trade accounted for 70 per cent of the total while 23 per cent was inter-provincial. In 1900–01, imports from other provinces of British India amounted to ₹13.43 crores while exports to other provinces amounted to ₹11.52 crores. During the same year, exports to other countries reached ₹11.74 crores while imports were valued at ₹66.2 million. At the time of India's independence, imports of the presidency amounted to ₹71.32 crores a year while exports were valued at ₹645.1 million. Trade with the United Kingdom made up 31.54% of the total trade of the presidency with Madras the chief port accounting for 49% of the total trade.

Cotton piece-goods, cotton twist and yarn, metals and kerosene oil were the main items of import while animal hides and skins, raw cotton, coffee and piece-goods were the chief exports. Raw cotton, animal hides, oil seeds, grains, pulses, coffee, tea and cotton manufactures were the main items of sea trade. Most of the sea trade was carried through the presidency's principal port of Madras. Other important ports were Gopalpur, Kalingapatnam, Bimlipatnam, Visakhapatnam, Masulipatnam, Cocanada, Madras, Cuddalore, Negapatam, Pamban and Tuticorin on the east coast along with Mangalore, Cannanore, Calicut, Cochin, Alleppey, Quilon (Coulão) and Colachel on the western seaboard. The port of Cochin was taken over by the Government of India on 1 August 1936, and that of Madras on 1 April 1937. There were Chambers of Commerce in Madras, Cochin and Cocanada. These chambers each nominated a member to the Madras Legislative Council.

Cotton-ginning and weaving were two of the main industries in the Madras Presidency. Cotton was produced in large quantities in the Bellary district and was pressed in Georgetown, Madras. The scarcity of cotton in Lancashire caused by a decline in trade due to the American Civil War gave an impetus to cotton and textile production and led to cotton presses being established all over the presidency. In the early years of the 20th century, Coimbatore emerged as an important centre for cotton textiles and earned the epithet "Manchester of South India". The northern districts of Godavari, Vizagapatam and Kistna were well-known cotton-weaving centres. There was a sugar factory at Aska in Ganjam run by F. J. V. Minchin and another at Nellikuppam in South Arcot district run by the East India Distilleries and Sugar Factories Company. In the Telugu-speaking northern districts of the presidency large quantities of tobacco were cultivated to be subsequently rolled into cheroots. Trichinopoly, Madras and Dindigul were the main cheroot-producing areas. Until the discovery of artificial aniline and alizarine dyes, Madras possessed a thriving vegetable dye manufacturing industry. The city also imported large quantities of aluminium for the manufacture of aluminium utensils. In the early 20th century, the government established the Chrome Tanning Factory which manufactured high-quality leather. The first brewery in the presidency was founded in the Nilgiri Hills in 1826. Coffee was cultivated in the region of Wynad and the kingdoms of Coorg and Mysore while tea was grown on the slopes of the Nilgiri Hills. Coffee plantations were also established in Travancore but a severe blight at the end of the 19th century destroyed coffee cultivation in the kingdom and almost wiped out coffee plantations in neighbouring Wynad. Coffee-curing works were located at Calicut, Mangalore and Coimbatore. In 1947, Madras had 3,761 factories with 276,586 operatives.

The presidency's fishing industry thrived, with Shark's fins, fish maws and fish curing-operations the main sources of income for fishermen. The southern port of Tuticorin was a centre of conch-fishing but Madras, along with Ceylon, was mainly known for its pearl fisheries. Pearl fisheries were harvested by the Paravas and was a lucrative profession.

The total revenue of the presidency was ₹57 crores in 1946–47 made as follows: Land revenue, ₹8.53 crores; Excise, ₹14.68 crores; Income tax, ₹4.48 crores; Stamp revenue, ₹4.38 crores; forests, ₹1.61 crores; other taxes, ₹8.45 crores; Extraordinary receipts, ₹2.36 crores and revenue fund, Rs.5.02 crores. Total expenditure for 1946–47 was ₹569.9 million. 208,675 k.v.a of electricity was generated at the end of 1948 of which 98% was under government ownership. The total amount of power generated was 467 million units.

The Madras Stock Exchange was established in Madras city in 1920 with a strength of 100 members but gradually faded away and membership had reduced to three by 1923 when it had to be closed down. Nevertheless, the Madras Stock Exchange was successfully revived in September 1937 and was incorporated as the Madras Stock Exchange Association Limited. EID Parry, Binny and Co. and Arbuthnot Bank were the largest private-owned business corporations at the turn of the 20th century. EID Parry manufactured and sold chemical fertilizers and sugar while the Binnys marketed cotton garments and uniforms manufactured at its spinning and weaving facility, the Buckingham and Carnatic Mills in Otteri. Arbuthnot, owned by the Arbuthnot family, was the largest bank in the presidency until its crash in 1906. Reduced to penury, disillusioned former Indian investors established the Indian Bank with funds donated by Nattukottai Chetties.

Between 1913 and 1914, Madras had 247 companies. In 1947, the city led in the establishment of registered factories but employed only 62% of the total productive capital.

The first Western-style banking institution in India was the Madras Bank which was established on 21 June 1683, with a capital of one hundred thousand pounds sterling. This was followed by the opening of the Carnatic Bank in 1788, the Bank of Madras in 1795 and the Asiatic Bank in 1804. In 1843, all the banks were merged to form the Bank of Madras. The Bank of Madras had branches in all the presidency's major cities and princely states including Coimbatore, Mangalore, Calicut, Alleppy, Cocanada, Guntur, Masulipatnam, Ootacamund, Negapataam, Tuticorin, Bangalore, and Cochin, as well as a branch in Colombo in British Ceylon. In 1921, the Bank of Madras merged with the Bank of Bombay and the Bank of Bengal to form the Imperial Bank of India. In the 19th century, the Arbuthnot Bank was one of the largest privately owned banks in the presidency. The City Union Bank, the Indian Bank, Canara Bank, Corporation Bank, Nadar Bank, Karur Vysya Bank, Catholic Syrian Bank, Karnataka Bank, Bank of Chettinad, Andhra Bank, Vysya Bank, Vijaya Bank, Indian Overseas Bank and the Bank of Madura were some of the leading banks headquartered in the presidency.

== Transport and communication ==
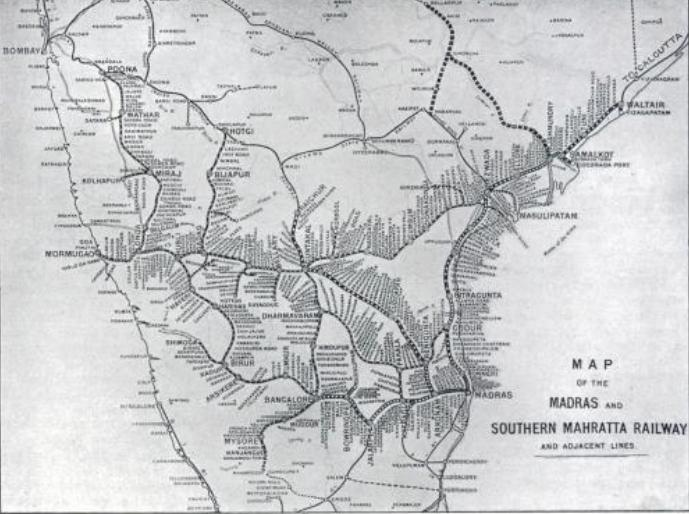
Map of the Madras and South Mahratta Railway lines

In the early days of the agency, the only means of transportation were bullock-carts known as jhatkas along with palanquins. The roads connecting Madras to Calcutta in the north and the kingdom of Travancore in the south served as lines of communication during wars. From the early 20th century onwards, bullock-carts and horses were gradually replaced by bicycles and motor vehicles, while motor buses were the main means of private road transportation. Presidency Transport and the City Motor Service were pioneers, operating buses manufactured by Simpson and Co. as early as 1910. The first organised bus system in Madras city was operated by Madras Tramways Corporation between 1925 and 1928. The 1939 Motor Vehicles Act imposed restrictions on public-owned bus and motor services. Most of the early bus services were operated by private agencies.

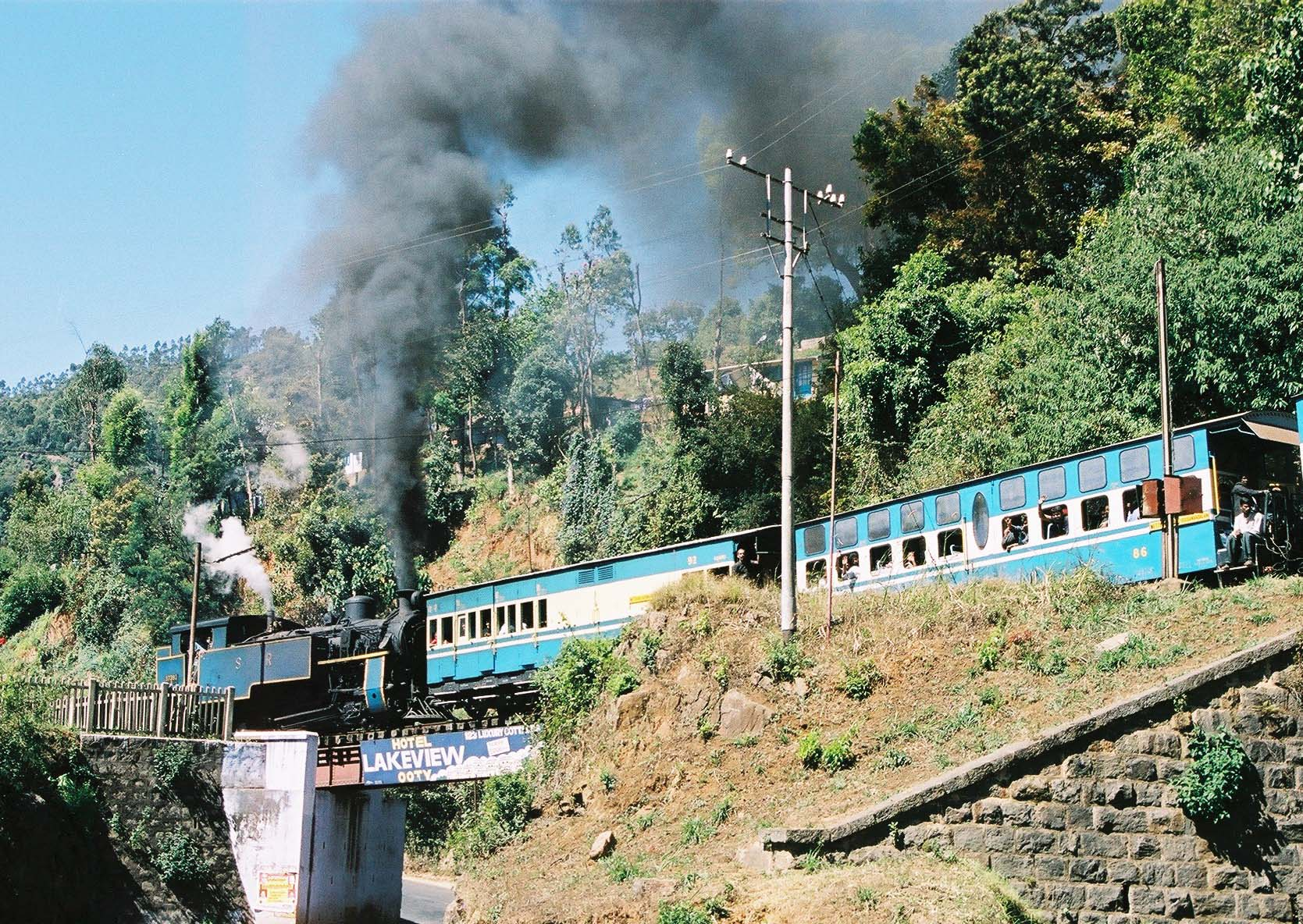
The Nilgiri Mountain Railway, a UNESCO World Heritage Site

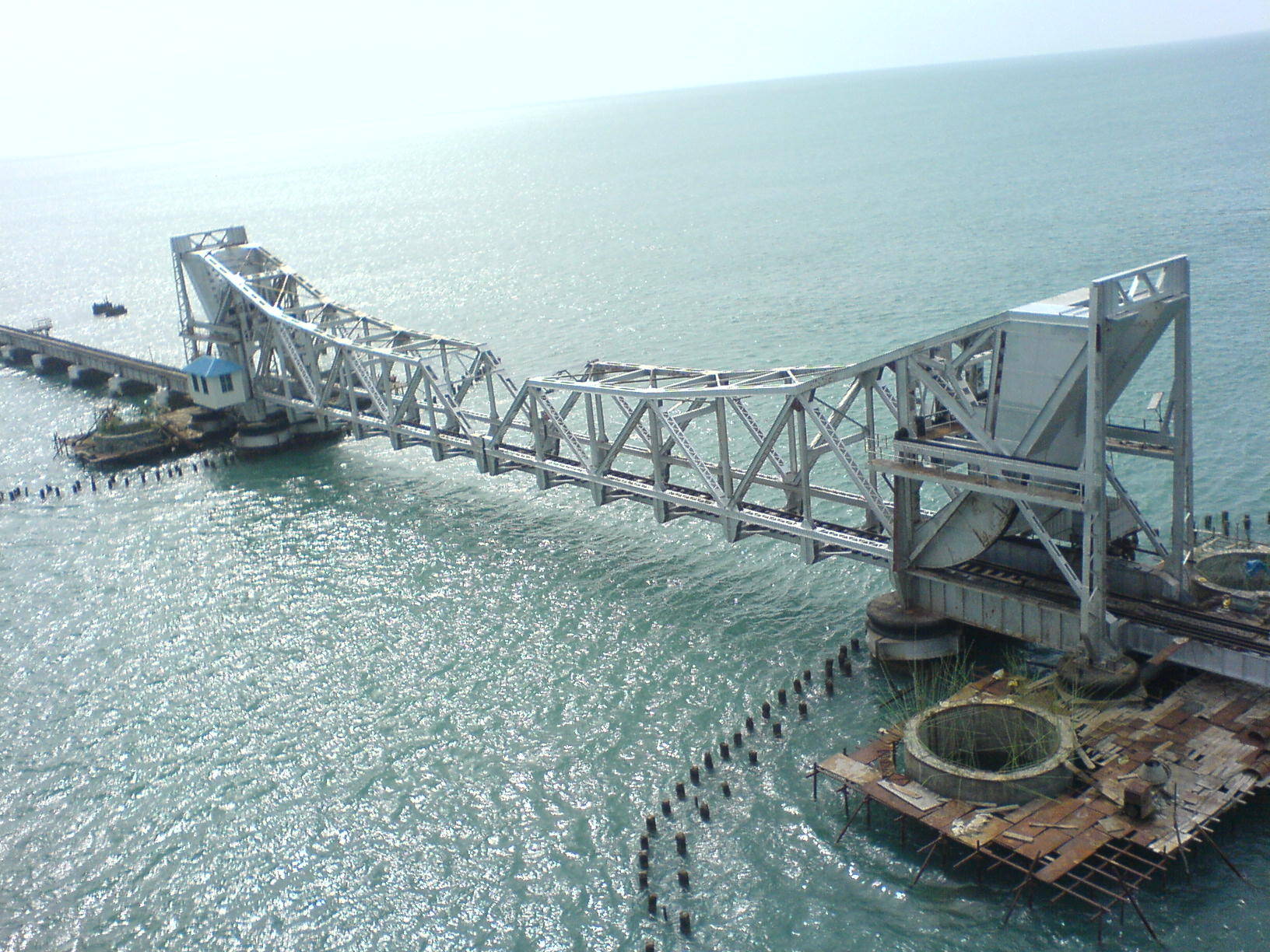
The Pamban railway bridge, which connects the Pamban island with the Indian mainland was constructed in 1914

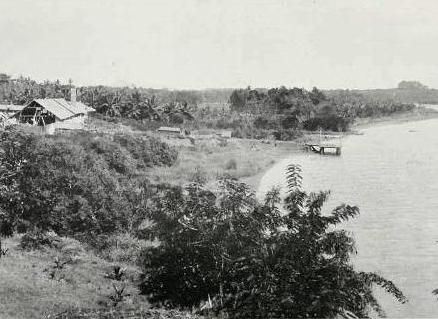
A backwater and canal in Malabar, c. 1913

The first organised initiative for the construction of new roads and maintenance of existing roads in the presidency was initiated in 1845 with the appointment of a special officer for the maintenance of main roads. The principal roads under the aegis of the officer were the Madras-Bangalore road, Madras-Trichinopoly road, Madras-Calcutta road, Madras-Cuddapah road and the Sumpajee Ghaut road. A Public Works Department was initiated by Lord Dalhousie in 1852 and subsequently in 1855 an East coast canal was constructed for the purpose of easy navigation. Roadways were handled by the Public Works Secretariat which was under the control of the member of the Governor's Executive Council. The principal highways of the presidency were the Madras-Calcutta road, the Madras-Travancore road and the Madras-Calicut road. By 1946–47, the Madras Presidency had 26,201 miles (42,166 km) of metalled roads and 14,406 miles (23,184 km) of unmetalled roads, and 1,403 miles (2,258 km) of navigable canals.

The first railway line in South India was laid between Madras and Arcot, which was opened for traffic on 1 July 1856. The line was constructed by the Madras Railway Company formed in 1845. The railway station at Royapuram, the first in South India, was built in 1853 and served as the headquarters of the Madras Railway Company. The Great Southern of India Railway Company was set up in the United Kingdom in 1853. and had its headquarters at Trichinopoly where it constructed its first railway line between Trichinopoly and Negapatam in 1859. The Madras Railway Company operated standard or broad-gauge railway lines while the Great South Indian Railway Company operated metre-gauge railway lines. In 1874, The Great Southern Indian Railway Company merged with the Carnatic Railway Company (established in 1864) and was renamed the Southern Indian Railway Company. The Southern Indian Railway Company merged with the Pondicherry Railway Company in 1891 while the Madras Railway Company merged with the Southern Mahratta Railway Company in 1908 to form the Madras and South Mahratta Railway Company. A new terminus was built at Egmore for the Madras and South Mahratta Railway Company. In 1927, the South Indian Railway Company shifted its headquarters from Madurai to Chennai Central. The company operated a suburban electric train service for Madras city from May 1931 onwards. In April 1944, the Madras and South Mahratta Railway Company was taken over by the Madras Government. In 1947, there were 4,961 miles (7,984 km) of railway in the presidency, in addition to 136 miles (219 km) of district board lines. Madras was well-connected with other Indian cities like Bombay and Calcutta and with Ceylon. The 6,776-foot (2,065 m) Pamban railway bridge connecting Mandapam on the Indian mainland with Pamban island was opened for traffic in 1914. The Nilgiri Mountain Railway was inaugurated between Mettupalayam and Ootacamund in 1899.

The Madras Tramways Corporation was promoted in Madras city in 1892 by Hutchinsons and Co. and began operating in 1895, before even London had its own tramway system. It plied six routes in Madras linking distant parts of Madras city and covered a total of 17 miles (27 km).

The chief navigable waterways in the presidency were the canals in the Godavari and the Kistna deltas. The Buckingham canal was cut in 1806 at a cost of 90 lakhs of silver to connect the city of Madras with the delta of the Kistna river at Peddaganjam. Ships of the British India Steam Navigation Company frequently docked at Madras and provided frequent services to Bombay, Calcutta, Colombo and Rangoon.

In 1917, Simpson and Co. arranged for a test flight by the first aeroplane in Madras while a flying club was established at the Mount Golf Club grounds near St Thomas Mount by a pilot named G. Vlasto in October 1929. This site was later used as the Madras aerodrome. One of the early members of the club, Rajah Sir Annamalai Chettiar went on to establish an aerodrome in his native Chettinad. On 15 October 1932, Royal Air Force pilot Nevill Vintcent piloted J. R. D. Tata's plane carrying air-mail from Bombay to Madras via Bellary. This was the beginning of Tata Sons' regular domestic passenger and airmail service from Karachi to Madras. The flight was later re-routed through Hyderabad and became bi-weekly. On 26 November 1935, Tata Sons started an experimental weekly service from Bombay to Trivandrum via Goa and Cannanore. From 28 February 1938, onwards, Tata Sons' Aviation division, now renamed Tata Airlines, began a Karachi to Colombo airmail service via Madras and Trichinopoly. On 2 March 1938, the Bombay-Trivandrum air service was extended to Trichinopoly.

The first organised postal service was established between Madras and Calcutta by Governor Edward Harrison in 1712. After reform and regularisation, a new postal system was started by Sir Archibald Campbell and was introduced on 1 June 1786. The presidency was divided into three postal divisions: Madras North up to Ganjam, Madras South-West to Anjengo (erstwhile Travancore) and Madras West, up to Vellore. In the same year, a link with Bombay was established then in 1837, the Madras, Bombay and Calcutta mail services were integrated to form the All-India Service. On 1 October 1854, the first stamps were issued by the Imperial Postal Service. The General Post Office (GPO), Madras, was established by Sir Archibald Campbell in 1786. In 1872–73, a bimonthly sea-mail service began between Madras and Rangoon. This was followed by the commencement of a fortnightly sea-mail service between Madras and ports on the eastern coast.

Madras was linked to the rest of the world through telegraphs in 1853 and a civilian telegraph service was introduced on 1 February 1855. Soon afterwards, telegraph lines linked Madras and Ootacamund with other cities in India. A Telegraph department was set up in 1854, with a Deputy Superintendent stationed in Madras city. The Colombo-Talaimannar telegraph line established in 1858, was extended to Madras in 1882, thereby connecting the city with Ceylon. Telephones were introduced in the presidency in 1881 and on 19 November 1881, the first telephone exchange with 17 connections was established at Errabalu Street in Madras. A wireless telegraphy service was established between Madras and Port Blair in 1920 and in 1936, the Indo-Burma radio telephone service was established between Madras and Rangoon.

== Education ==
The first schools offering Western-style education in the presidency were established in Madras during the 18th century. In 1822, a Board of Public Instruction was created based on the recommendations of Sir Thomas Munro, after which schools teaching students in vernacular language was established. A central training school was set up in Madras as per Munro's scheme. However, this system appeared to be a failure and the policy was altered in 1836 in order to promote European literature and science. The Board of Public Instruction was superseded by a Committee for Native Education. In January 1840, during the viceroyalty of Lord Ellenborough, a University Board was established with Alexander J. Arbuthnot as the Joint Director of Public Instruction. The central school was converted to a high school in April 1841 with 67 students and in 1853 became the Presidency College with the addition of a college department. On 5 September 1857, the University of Madras was established as an examining body using the University of London as a model with the first examinations held in February 1858. C. W. Thamotharam Pillai and Caroll V. Visvanatha Pillai of Ceylon were the first to graduate from the university. Sir S. Subramaniya Iyer was the first Indian Vice-Chancellor of the university.

Similarly, Andhra University was established by the Andhra University Act of 1925 and in 1937, the University of Travancore was established in the princely state of Travancore.

The Government Arts College, established in Kumbakonam in 1867, was one of the first educational institutions outside Madras. The oldest engineering college in the presidency, College of Engineering, Guindy, was established as a Government Survey School in 1794 before being upgraded to an Engineering College in 1861. Initially, only Civil Engineering was taught, with the further disciplines of Mechanical Engineering added in 1894, Electrical Engineering in 1930 and Telecommunication and Highways in 1945. The AC College, with its emphasis on textiles and leather technology, was founded by Alagappa Chettiar in 1944. The Madras Institute of Technology, which introduced courses such as aeronautical and automobile engineering was established in 1949. In 1827, the first medical school in the presidency was established then followed by the Madras Medical College in 1835. The Government Teacher's College was established at Saidapet in 1856.

Among the private institutions, the Pachaiyappa's College, established in 1842, is the oldest Hindu educational institution in the presidency. The Annamalai University, established by Rajah Sir Annamalai Chettiar in Chidambaram in 1929, was the first university in the presidency to have hostel facilities Christian missionaries were pioneers in promoting education in the region. The Madras Christian College, St. Aloysius College at Mangalore, Loyola College in Madras and the St. Peter's College at Tanjore were some of the educational institutions established by Christian missionaries.

The Madras Presidency had the highest literacy rate of all the provinces in British India. In 1901, Madras had a male literacy rate of 11.9 per cent and a female literacy rate of 0.9 per cent. In 1950, when the Madras Presidency became Madras State, the literacy rate was slightly higher than the national average of 18 per cent. In 1901, there were 26,771 public and private institutions with 923,760 scholars of whom 784,621 were male and 139,139 female. By 1947, the number of educational institutions had increased to 37,811 and the number of scholars to 3,989,686. Apart from colleges, in 1947 there were 31,975 public and elementary schools, 720 secondary schools for boys and 4,173 elementary and 181 secondary schools for girls. Most of the early graduates were Brahmins. The preponderance of Brahmins in the universities and in the civic administration was one of the main causes for the growth of the Anti-Brahmin movement in the presidency. Madras was also the first province in British India where caste-based communal reservations were introduced.

In 1923, the Madras University Act was passed after its introduction by Education Minister A. P. Patro. Under the bill's provisions, the governing body of Madras University was completely reorganised on democratic lines. The bill asserted that the governing body would henceforth be headed by a Chancellor who would be assisted by a pro-Chancellor, usually the Minister of Education. Apart from the Chancellor and the pro-Chancellor who were elected, there was to be a Vice-Chancellor appointed by the Chancellor.

== Culture and society ==
Hindus, Muslims and Christians generally followed a joint family system. The society was largely patriarchal with the eldest male member the leader of the family. Most of the presidency followed a patrilineal system of inheritance. The only exceptions were the district of Malabar and the princely states of Travancore and Cochin which practised the marumakkathayam system.

Women were expected to confine themselves to indoor activities and the maintenance of the household. Muslims and high-caste Hindu women observed purdah. The daughter in the family rarely received an education and usually helped her mother with household chores. Upon marrying, she moved to the house of her in-laws where she was expected to serve her husband and the elder members of his family. There have been recorded instances of torture and ill treatment of daughters-in-law. A Brahmin widow was expected to shave her head and was subjected to numerous indignities.

Rural society comprised villages where people of different communities lived together. Brahmins lived in separate streets called agraharams. Untouchables lived outside village limits in small hamlets called cheris and were strictly forbidden from having houses in the village. They were also forbidden from entering important Hindu temples or approaching high-caste Hindus.

Serfdom was practised in almost all castes from Brahmins to non-Brahmins subjecting agricultural labourers to bondage for non-payment of debt. The Law Commission report on slavery in 1841 contains the indicative figures on the number of slaves, computed based on the population of specific castes of Pallar and Paraiyar. There were proposed regulations in 1811 and 1823 to prevent child labour. In 1833, the British Crown and the House of Commons proposed immediate abolition of slavery in India, but East India Company decreed otherwise. All legal recognition to permit the civil status of slavery were withdrawn with the Act V of 1843 and selling of slaves became a criminal offence in 1862 under the new Indian Penal Code. In spite of these regulations, serfdom continued and the slave population formed 12.2% – 20% of the total population in 1930 across various districts of the presidency.

The Malabar Marriage Act of 1896 recognised sambandham contracts as legal marriages while the marmakkathayam system was abolished by the Marmakkathayam Law of 1933. Numerous measures were taken to improve the lot of Dalit outcasts. The Thirumala Tirupathi Devasthanams Act (1933), included Dalits in the devasthanams administration. The presidency's Temple Entry Authorization Act (1939) and its Temple Entry Proclamation (1936) of Travancore were aimed at elevating the status of Dalit and other low castes to a position equal to that of high-caste Hindus. In 1872, T. Muthuswamy Iyer established the Widow Remarriage Association in Madras and advocated the remarriage of Brahmin widows. The devadasi system was regulated in 1927 and completely abolished on 26 November 1947. The Widow Remarriage movement was spearheaded in the Godavari district by Kandukuri Veeresalingam. Most of the pioneers of social reform were Indian nationalists.

Traditional pastimes and forms of recreation in rural areas were cock-fighting, bull-fighting, village fairs and plays. Men in urban areas indulged in social and communistic activities at recreational clubs, music concerts or sabhas, dramas and welfare organisations. Carnatic music and bharatanatyam were especially patronised by the upper and upper-middle class Madras society. Of the sports introduced by the British in the presidency, cricket, tennis, football, and hockey were the most popular. An annual cricket tournament, known as the Madras Presidency Matches, was held between Indians and Europeans during Pongal.

The presidency's first newspaper, the Madras Courier, was started on 12 October 1785, by Richard Johnston, a printer employed by the British East India Company. The first Indian-owned English-language newspaper was The Madras Crescent which was established by freedom-fighter Gazulu Lakshminarasu Chetty in October 1844. Lakshminarasu Chetty is also credited with the foundation of the Madras Presidency Association which was a forerunner of the Indian National Congress. The number of newspapers and periodicals published in the presidency totalled 821 in 1948. The two most popular English-language newspapers were The Hindu established by G. Subramania Iyer in 1878, and The Mail, established as the Madras Times by the Gantz family in 1868.

Regular radio service in the presidency commenced in 1938 when All India Radio established a station in Madras. Cinemas became popular in the 1930s and 1940s with the first film in a South Indian language, R. Nataraja Mudaliar's Tamil film Keechaka Vadham, released in 1916. The first sound films in Tamil and Telugu were made in 1931 while the first Kannada talkie Sati Sulochana was made in 1934 and the first Malayalam talkie Balan in 1938. There were film studios at Coimbatore, Salem, Madras and Karaikudi. Most early films were made in Coimbatore and Salem but from the 1940s onwards, Madras began to emerge as the principal centre of film production. Until the 1950s, most films in Telugu, Kannada and Malayalam were made in Madras.

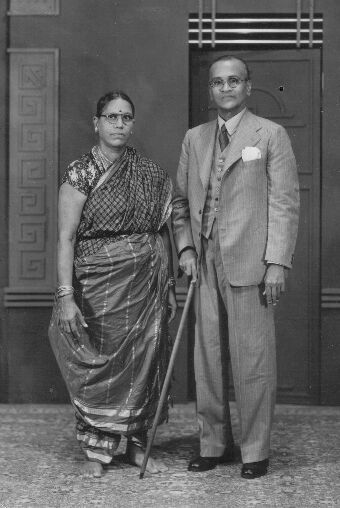
A Westernized middle-class urban Tamil Brahmin couple. c.a .1945

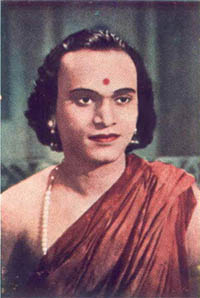
Tamil film actor M. K. Thyagaraja Bhagavathar

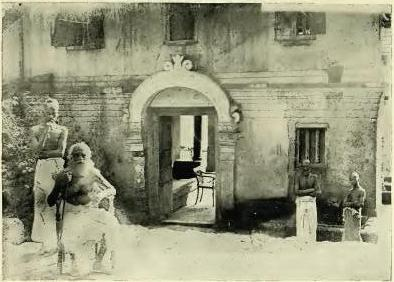
A Namboodiri Brahman's house, c.a. 1909

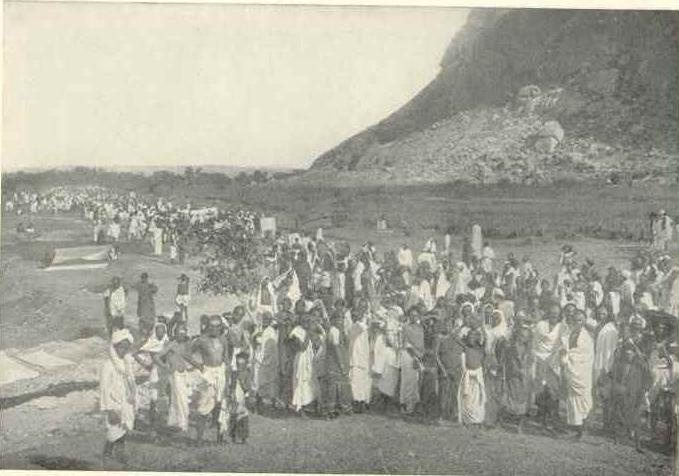
Hindu devotees in procession around the temple at Tirupparankunram, c.a. 1909

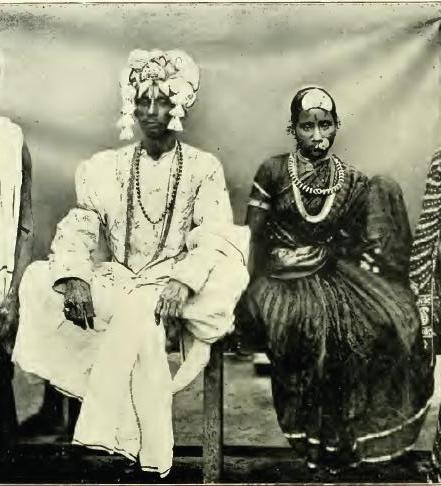
Telugu bride and groom belonging to the Kapu caste, c.a. 1909

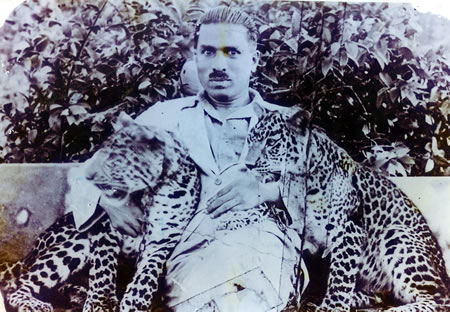
A Mangalorean Catholic gentleman belonging to the Bamonn caste, c. a. 1938

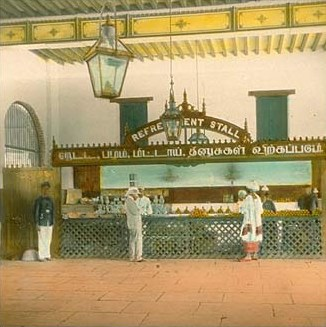
Refreshment stall at a railway station in the Madras Presidency, c. a. 1895

== See also ==
- History of Tamil Nadu
- History of Kerala
- Administrative divisions of Madras Presidency
- Madras States Agency
- List of colonial governors and presidents of Madras Presidency
- Advocate-General of Madras
- Sheriff of Madras
- Bengal Presidency
- Bombay Presidency
