= William Ayling (judge) =

Colonial Judge

- Born: William Bock Ayling; 30 August 1867; Weymouth, Dorset, England
- Died: 25 September 1946 (aged 79); Berkhamsted, Hertfordshire, England
- Occupation: Indian Civil Servant
- Known for: Judge at the High Court of Madras

Sir William Bock Ayling (30 August 1867 – 25 September 1946) was a British civil servant and judge who served on the bench of the Madras High Court from 1912 to 1924.

== Early life ==
Ayling was born at Weymouth in Dorset on 30 August 1867 to Frederick William and Maria Ayling; his father was described as a lodging house keeper in 1871. Ayling was educated at Weymouth College and Magdalene College. He joined the Indian civil service in 1886 and arrived in India on 30 January 1889 on completion of his training.

== Career ==
Ayling served as Assistant Collector and magistrate and was appointed as Sub-Collector in January 1900. From 1903 he served as a district and sessions judge and in 1912. He served as the Principal District Judge of Salem District of Madras Presidency during March 1907 to February 1908, and from January 1909 to June 1910. (Refer Salem District E-court). Ayling was appointed judge of the Madras High Court and served till 1924. He also officiated as Chief Justice for a short period in 1921.

As Chief Justice, Ayling headed the three-member committee appointed to investigate the 1921 Buckingham and Carnatic Mills Strike. Apart from Ayling, the committee consisted of two Indians - a Brahmin and a non-Brahmin. The committee submitted its report in a short while blaming the striking workers for indulging in violence against Dalits.

== Death ==
Ayling died at his house at Berkhamsted on 25 September 1946, at age 79.

Ayling married Emma Annie Graham in 1901. Emma died in 1912. Ayling was made a Knight Bachelor in 1915.
