= Star Vijay =

Tamil-language television channel

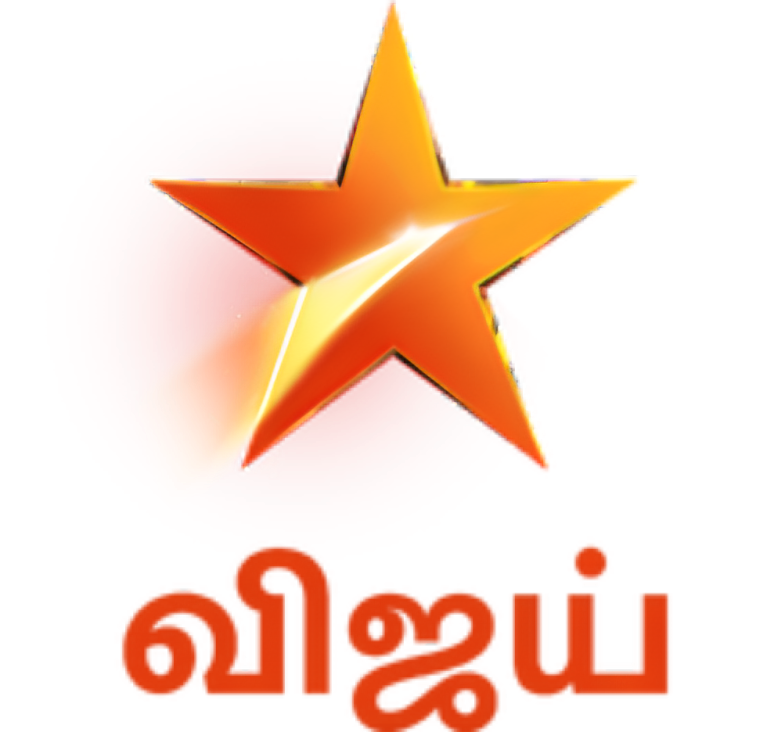
- Logo used since 2017
- Type: Television channel
- Country: India
- Broadcast area: Worldwide
- Network: JioStar
- Headquarters: Chennai, Tamil Nadu, India

Programming
- Language: Tamil
- Picture format: 1080p HDTV

Ownership
- Owner: JioStar
- Key people: Krishnan Kutty (EVP & Channel Head); Balachandran Rathinavel (Business Head); Pradeep Milroy Peter (Programming Head)
- Sister channels: Colors Tamil; Star Vijay Super; Star Vijay Takkar

History
- Launched: 24 November 1994; 31 years ago
- Former names: Golden Eagle Communication (GEC) (until 1995); Vijay TV (1995–2001, 2021–present, international feed only); Star Vijay (2001–present, India)

Links
- Website: Star Vijay on Disney+ Hotstar

Availability

Streaming media
- JioHotstar: India

Star Vijay is an Indian Tamil language general entertainment pay television channel owned by JioStar, a joint venture between Viacom18 and Disney India. The channel telecasts programmes such as serials, reality shows and Tamil films.

== History ==
The channel was first launched by N. P. V. Ramasamy Udayar on 24 November 1994, as Golden Eagle Communication (GEC). That same year it applied for the line-up of Singapore Cable Vision becoming the first Tamil channel on offer. United Breweries Group acquired the channel in 1995 and renamed it as Vijay TV. The UTV Group bought the controlling interest from United Breweries Group in 1999 for ₹180 million. In 2001, Star India took over the channel and rebranded it as Star Vijay. Star acquired 51 percent stake in Vijay TV with UTV holding the remaining 49 percent. In 2004, UTV Software Communications offloaded its entire 44 percent stake in Vijay TV to Star India for ₹31 crores.

This channel, along with Star One, was launched in Hong Kong in 2007.

The high-definition feed, Star Vijay HD, was launched on 29 May 2016.

On 25 August 2016, its sibling channel Star Vijay Super was launched, which airs non-stop films and legacy television shows and later got revamped into a full movie channel with a tagline "Dhool Cinema Dhinam Dhinam".

On 4 October 2020, it launched a music channel named Star Vijay Music, which was later rebranded as Star Vijay Takkar on October 9, 2022.

== Sister Channels ==
=== Colors Tamil ===
Colors Tamil is an Indian Tamil language general entertainment pay television channel owned by JioStar, a joint venture between Viacom18 and Disney India on 19 February 2018. The channel's headquarters is in Chennai, Tamil Nadu. It primarily telecasts programs such as serials, reality shows and Tamil films.

=== Star Vijay Super ===
Star Vijay Super is an Indian Tamil language movie pay television channel owned by JioStar a Joint Venture between Viacom18 and Disney India.

=== Star Vijay Takkar ===
Star Vijay Takkar is an Indian Tamil youth oriented entertainment pay television channel owned by JioStar a Joint Venture between Viacom18 and Disney India that was launched on 9 October 2022 replacing former channel Star Vijay Music.

=== Vijay TV International ===
Vijay TV is an International Versions for Star Vijay, pay television channel owned by JioStar a Joint Venture between Viacom18 and Disney India that was launched on 2002, Previously as Star Vijay International for Outside of Indian Tamils diasporas in Middle East (Saudi Arabia, United Arab Emirates), South Africa, Europe, United Kingdom, North America (USA and Canada), Australia, New Zealand, Sri Lanka, Singapore and Malaysia, On 22 January 2021, The channel are rebranding and based by Utsav Network for Yellow Colours to Vijay TV.

== Reception ==
When Star India took over the channel from UTV Communications, the channel's revenue, shares and advertising rates increased. A revamp in 2017 brought with it a new logo and launched Bigg Boss Tamil Season 1, after which the audience share of the channel—which had been 10%-15%—increased by 10%, being the second most-watched Tamil television channel.

In week 48 of 2020, Star Vijay became the most watched Tamil GEC in prime time while being the second most watched Tamil GEC overall after Sun TV. In week 50, it garnered its highest viewership ratings of 7,14,002 AMAs (average minute audience (in hundreds)) being the fifth most watched Indian television channel.
