= Sri Ramachandra Institute of Higher Education and Research =

Private medical institution in Chennai, India

- Motto: Higher Values in Higher Education
- Type: Private
- Established: 1985
- Founder: N. P. V. Ramasamy Udayar
- Accreditation: NAAC A++
- Chancellor: V. R. Venkataachalam
- Vice-Chancellor: Dr. Uma Sekar
- Undergraduates: 5,138
- Postgraduates: 1,475
- Location: Porur, Chennai, Tamil Nadu, India; 13.0395°N 80.1427°E
- Website: sriramachandra.edu.in

Sri Ramachandra Institute of Higher Education and Research (SRIHER) is a private institute located in Porur, Chennai, India. SRIHER consists of nine constituent colleges and faculties with more than 6,000 students. SRIHER was founded by Sri Ramachandra Education & Health Trust on September 11, 1985, by N. P. V. Ramasamy Udayar. It was founded as a medical college, and awarded the deemed-to-be-university status in September 1994.

== Rankings ==
University and college rankings

General – India
- NIRF (Overall) (2024): 96
- NIRF (Universities) (2024): 55

Medical – India
- NIRF (2024): 20
- India Today (2020): 22

Pharmacy – India
- NIRF (2024): 31

Dental – India
- NIRF (2024): 10

The National Institutional Ranking Framework (NIRF) ranked Sri Ramachandra Institute of Higher Education and Research 96 overall in India in 2024, 10th in Dental Category, 55 among universities, 20 in the medical ranking, and 31 in the pharmacy ranking. It was ranked 1 among among private health science university in India in 2022 by India Today.

== Academics ==
The college offers the four-and-a-half-year M.B.B.S. course with a one-year compulsory rotating internship. There are 250 seats which are filled through NEET UG exam.

=== Postgraduate and doctoral courses ===
SRIHER offers postgraduate courses in almost all subjects including surgery, medicine, gynecology etc. Similarly it offers a variety of Doctoral courses including MCh in Neurosurgery, Surgical oncology, Cardiac Surgery among others and DM in Cardiology, Neurology etc.
