= Binny and Co. =

Indian shipping, textile, banking and insurance firm

- Company type: Public
- Fate: split into multiple companies

Binny and Co. was a shipping, textile, banking and insurance firm based in the city of Chennai, India. It was one of the oldest business firms in Chennai city.

The company was responsible for the development of much of North Madras. It helped lay the foundations of major industry in Madras with the Buckingham and Carnatic Mills. Binny and Co was one of the founding members of the Madras Chamber of Commerce and Industry.

== History ==
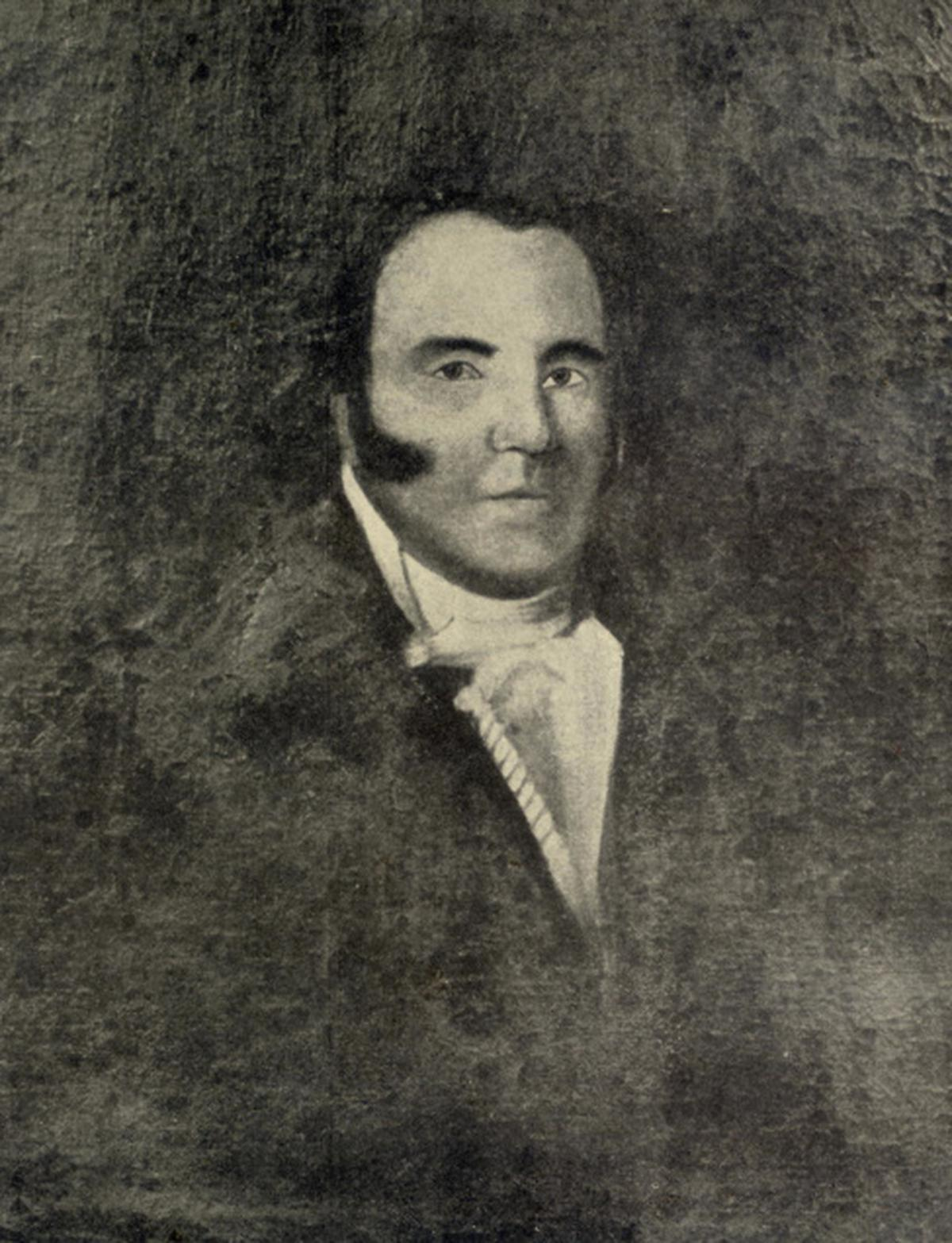
John Binny

Binny and Co. was founded in Madras by John Binny as a general, clearing and forwarding agency in 1797. The company's first headquarters was a building then known as Amir Bagh on Mount Road. The company, then moved to a house a few blocks away, where Hotel Taj Connemara is now situated. With the passage of time, Binny and Co entered the banking and insurance sectors.

John Binny set up a partnership with Mr Denison and renamed the company as Binny and Denison in 1800. The firm moved to its present headquarters in Armenian Street in 1812. In 1814, it changed its name to Binny and Co. Binny and Co were the landing agents for the British India Steam Navigation Company and had a fleet of 35 barges and 30 lighters to transport men and goods from ships to land. They also ran a motor bus service for land transportation.

Binny and Co set-up the Buckingham Mills in 1876 followed by the Carnatic Mills in 1881. Both were merged to form the Buckingham and Carnatic Mills in 1920. They made khaki drill world-famous. The Bangalore Cotton, Silk and Woolen Mills was set-up in Bangalore in 1884.

In 1897, the company ventured into sugar industry which proved to disastrous. The Deccan Sugar and Abkhari Company was set up and soon began losing money. By 1902, Binny was in dire straits and Parry had to buy the loss-making unit from Binny. In 1903, Binny ventured into coal mining industry and in 1905, it became the local agent for Burmah-Shell, setting up a large storage facility at Royapuram. Under John Alexander Boyson, Binny pioneered electricity and trams in Madras.

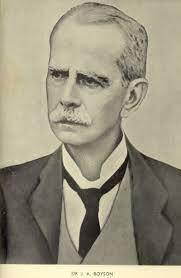
John Boyson

Binny and Co suffered heavily from the crash of the bank Arbuthnot & Co on 22 October 1906. On 31st October 1906, Binny and Co went into voluntary liquidation. On 16 November, it was taken over by James Mackay, George Mackenzie and Duncan Mackinnon and resurrected as a private limited firm under the Inchcape group. India's independence on 15 August 1947 further crippled the fortunes of the company.

The Buckingham and Carnatic Mills, the company's only venture that was still successful, began to decline and faced losses by the 1970s due to lack of modernisation and damage caused by flooding. The mills closed down their operations in 1996 due to labour unrest and financial losses.and the mills were sold out in 2001.

in 1987, Binny & Co. was acquired by the Udayar group led by N. P. V. Ramasamy Udayar. The company was split into multiple units in 2010.

== See also ==
- EID Parry
- Arbuthnot & Co
