= N. P. V. Ramasamy Udayar =

Indian industrialist

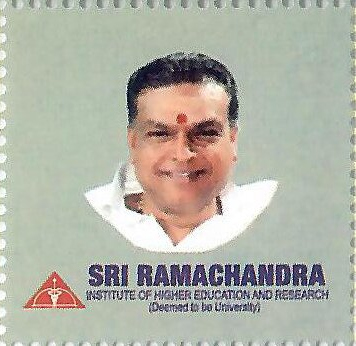
- N. P. V. Ramasamy Udayar on a 2020 stamp of India
- Born: 19 September 1936; Rasipuram, Namakkal, Tamil Nadu, India
- Died: 1998 (aged 61–62)
- Occupations: industrialist, educationalist, philanthropist
- Title: founder of Sri Ramachandra University
- Children: V.R. Venkatachalam, Padma Ramasamy, Amudha Thillanayagam, Radha Muthiah, Andal Arumugam, Arundhathi Shanmugam.

N. P. V. Ramasamy Udayar was an Indian industrialist and a close associate of MG Ramachandran. He owned Mohan Breweries and Distilleries, first liquor manufacturer when state lifted liquor ban. In 1985, Sri Ramachandra Medical College, first privately owned medical college was founded in Tamil Nadu, later it became as Sri Ramachandra University. According to the Urban Land Ceiling Act, his trust occupied land was under dispute later. In April 1987, the Government has changed the rules to obtain exemption from the Act. In 1994, he launched a Tamil channel called GEC (Golden Eagle Communication), which was later acquired by Star India and renamed as Star Vijay.
