= Buckingham and Carnatic Mills =

Textile mill in Chennai, India

Buckingham and Carnatic Mills, popularly known as B & C Mills, were textile mills run by Binny and Co. in the city of Madras (now called Chennai), India. The mills were closed down in 1996 and the site is now used as a container freight station and is a popular venue for film shootings.

== History ==
Messrs Binny & Co, one of the biggest private enterprises in the then city of Madras, set up a textile mill of its own, the Buckingham Mills in the wedge between Perambur, Vepery and Basin Bridge. The company was registered on 17 August 1876 and started functioning in January 1878. The Carnatic Mills were founded on 30 June 1881. The two companies were merged in 1920. Binny also started the Bangalore Woollen, Cotton and Silk Mills in 1884. The mills functioned successfully till the 1970s when rot set in. Running on heavy losses, the mills were finally closed in 1996.

India's first labour union, the Madras Labour Union (MLU) was formed at Buckingham and Carnatic Mills by B. P. Wadia and V. Kalyanasundaram Mudaliar on 27 April 1918.
