= Madras Chamber of Commerce and Industry =

Madras Chamber of Commerce and Industry is a non-governmental, industry-led and industry-managed organisation whose main purpose is to influence government policy on economy, trade, commerce and industry. It also works for better education, health, infrastructure and environment.

== History ==
The Madras Chamber of Commerce was established on 29 September 1836 by eight businessman, chief of whom were J. W. Dare of Parry & Co., W. S. Binny of Binny & Co. and J. A. Arbuthnot of Arbuthnot & Co., at the office of Binny & Co., a leading Indian business house with J. A. Arbuthnot as its first Chairman. Other important companies in the chamber were Line & Co, Ouchterlony & Co, Barrow & Co, Fischer & Co, Guichard & Co, Seth Sam & Co, G. Sidloo Chetty and J. C. Tulloch. The chamber got its first permanent venue in 1869 when a part of The Madras Mail office was leased to them. In 1924, the chamber moved to the offices of the Mercantile Bank.

Right from the initial stages, native Indians did not join in large numbers in the chamber as in the case of the Southern Indian Chamber of Commerce and Industry. Indian merchants chose to start their own organisations such as the Madras Trades Association. The chamber got its first Indian President only in 1964.

In the early 1900s, the chamber played a pivotal role in the development of Indian Railways.
