= Mariadas Ruthnaswamy =

Indian politician

M. Ruthnaswamy

Councillor,Corporation of Madras
- In office 1921–1923

Madras Legislative Council
- In office September 1925 – 1926

President of the Council,Corporation of Madras
- In office 1925–1925

List of Rajya Sabha members from Tamil Nadu
- In office 3 April 1962 – 2 April 1968

List of Rajya Sabha members from Tamil Nadu
- In office 3 April 1968 – 2 April 1974

Personal details
- Born: Mariadas Ruthnaswamy; August 1885. Royapuram,Madras Presidency, British India (now in Chennai, Tamil Nadu, India
- Died: 1977 (aged 91–92) Chennai, Tamil Nadu, India
- Party: Justice Party (1919-1944), Swatantra Party (1959)
- Education: St. Joseph's College, Cuddalore (1903),Nizam College,Hyderabad (1907).University of Cambridge(1910).Gray's Inn (1907–1910).

Mariadas Ruthnaswamy CIE, KCSG (1885–1977) was a leading educationalist, statesman and a writer in Madras (now Chennai, Tamil Nadu), India.

He was educated in Secunderabad, Hyderabad and in Cuddalore in the then Madras Presidency he went on to study in Oxford and Cambridge, ultimately qualifying as a barrister at Gray's Inn, London. In his political career Ruthnaswamy was a Councillor for the Corporation of Madras, then a member of the Madras Legislative Council, being appointed President of the Council in September 1925 after the death of L. D. Swamikannu Pillai. He held office until the following election, in November 1926. He later served on the Madras Service Commission, as Member and later chairman, was nominated as a member of the Central Legislative Assembly, and after independence nominated as a member of the Rajya Sabha (1968–74).

He was initially associated with the Justice Party, and after it was dissolved remained independent until he joined the newly formed Swatantra Party.

From 1942 to 1948 he was the Vice-Chancellor of Annamalai University.

== Early life and education ==
The son of Rai Bahadur M.I. Ruthnaswamy, Ruthnaswamy was educated at St. Anne's School, Secunderabad; he later went on to matriculate at St. Joseph's College, Cuddalore in 1903, completing his graduation from Nizam's College, Hyderabad in 1907. While at school and college, he was declared on several occasions as the best orator, and was also prominent in cultural activities. In 1907, he secured admission in Jesus College, Oxford, and left for England, later shifting to the University of Cambridge to complete his History Tripos in 1910. At the same time he enrolled himself in Gray's Inn (1907–1910) and returned to India as a barrister in 1911. He was determined not to practice law in spite of compulsion from his father.

== Educationist, administrator and politician ==
Ruthnaswamy became a Councillor, Corporation of Madras in 1921 a position he held till 1923. It was also in 1921 that the post of Principal, Pachiappa's College was offered, he was to become the first Indian Principal of that institution, the position that he successfully held till 1927. During his period in the Madras Legislative Assembly, he was known for his wit and quick repartee, when Sir Kurma Venkata Reddi Naidu made a remark that he had delivered 200 lectures, Ruthnaswamy was quick to reply "Is any Minister justified in inflicting lectures upon the electorate?" In the previous year Mr S Satyamurthy declared "We fought as Swarajists...." Then Mr Abbas Ali said 'We fought as Muhammedans" Ruthnaswamy enquired 'Whether the Muhammedans could have fought the elections as any other than Muhammadans "

In 1925, Ruthnaswamy was elected President, Madras Legislative Council at a young age of 40, which he was to hold with distinction for a year. The Madras Legislative Council with 132 members had luminaries like S. Satyamurti, Raja of Panagal, PT Rajan, S. Srinivasa Iyengar, Arcot Ramaswami Mudaliar and P. Subbarayan among others. The Governor had a 4 Member Executive Council -N E Majoribanks (Revenue), Khan Bahadur Mohammad Usman of Madras (Home), T E Moir (Finance)and A.Y.G. Campbell (Law). Chief Minister was Raja of Panagal two other Ministers being A. P. Patro and T. N. Sivagnanam Pillai. Recognising his manifold talents in Constitutional Law, he was nominated as Member, Central Legislative Assembly in 1927. In 1928 he became the first Indian Principal, Madras Law College, Madras, a position that was held by Ruthnaswamy till 1930. In 1930 Ruthnaswamy became Member, Madras Service Commission, a post he held with distinction for 12 years (till 1942). The Madras Service Commission was the forerunner on the present day Tamil Nadu Public Service Commission. Madras Service Commission came into being through an Act in 1929, the Madras Presidency had the unique honour of being the first among all the Presidencies to establish a Service Commission. It had 3 Members. Soon after leaving the Madras Service Commission, he became Vice-Chancellor, Annamalai University, which he held for 2 terms – 1942–1948

== Editor, journalist and writer ==
Ruthnaswamy was a prolific writer known for his erudition and breath of vision, seen both in his books and as an Editor and journalist. He contributed his knowledge liberally to national newspapers like Sunday Standard and Statesman, political journals like Swaraja and local newspapers like Madras Mail among others. He was –

- Editor, Standard, 1921–1923
- Editor, Democracy, 1950–1955
- Editor, Tamil Nadu, 1951–1955
- Editor, Thondan, 1972

During the intervening years before becoming active again in politics Professor Ruthnaswamy with his eclectic range of subjects gave talks both in India and abroad one such was to East – West Society on "Indian culture" in Singapore reported by the Singapore newspaper Straits Times.

== Swatantra years ==
Ruthnaswamy was not a believer in Nehruvian socialism which led to "permit raj" which meant government's role in commanding heights of the economy. Once the formation of the Swatantra Party was announced in Madras on 6 June 1959 by C. Rajagopalachari and Minoo Masani, one of the earliest members were Ruthnaswamy, NG Ranga, Field Marshal K. M. Cariappa and the Maharaja of Patiala. Prof. N.G. Ranga one of the founders of the Swatantra Party mentioned, "Decades later, when we formed the Swatantra Party with the blessings of Sri Rajagopalachari... with myself as the President, Ruthnaswami was good enough to join it and we were all happy to elect him as its Vice-President..... We elected Ruthnaswami to the Rajya Sabha for 2 terms.. He was however eloquent and persuasive advocate. He was listened to with great respect. Ruthnaswami wanted priority to be given to coordination of opposition because he was particular about bi-partisan Parliamentarianism. All our efforts to help Swatantra, Janata, B.K.D and Praja parties to combine or to coordinate failed... Ruthnaswami felt deeply disappointed about the prospects for Indian democracy Erdman in his book was to remark "..highly regarded was Ruthnaswamy one of the founding fathers of Swatantra...Ruthnaswamy remained aloof from organised politics until Swatantra was established. Ruthnaswamy with Dahyabhai Patel, he was Swatantra's ablest spokesman in the Rajya Sabha, and after the resignation of Paliwal, was named as the Vice-President of the party"

His speeches in Parliament covered a wide range of subject, clear and incisive, for instance on Railways "as for the chronic overcrowding in third class carriages, it was the routine complaint of the representatives of the people against the old British Administration. It is tragic to find this complaint has still justification in these years of freedom and independence"( Speech on Railway Budget – 24 March 1962). On Foreign policy " Now, the independence of Tibet is absolutely necessary for the defence of India. ....we should have protested against the occupation of Tibet by China.... we allowed Tibet to be gobbled up by China" (Speech on Foreign Affairs- 23 June 1962) a few months later China attacked India on 20 October 1962 with disastrous consequences, on University Grants Commission (Speech on University Grants Commission – 23 June 1962) Decrying less money was spent for the endowment of teaching, that "buildings seem to be the preoccupation of our Vice-Chancellors and our Senates and academic councils", he was to foresee what was to happen 50 years later when Vice-Chancellor, University of Hyderabad went further when he spent a whopping sum of Rs 30.1 million on renovation of his bungalow by reducing amount to be spent on research and scholarships

== Honours conferred ==
Ruthnaswamy was decorated as a Companion of the Order of the Indian Empire (CIE) in 1930. In 1937, Pope Pius XI conferred the Knight Commander's Cross of the Order of St. Gregory the Great (KCSG) on him. This honour is conferred on Catholics and non-Catholics alike. In 1968, the Government of India conferred Ruthnaswamy with the Padma Bhushan for Literature and Education One of the rare occasions when the Leader of the Opposition (Rajya Sabha) was conferred such an award.

== Legacy ==
According to the papers of N. G. Ranga, Prof. M. Ruthnaswami was described as a scholar and academic administrator who held several senior positions in higher education and public service. Ranga noted that Ruthnaswami served as Principal of Pachaiyappa's College, later becoming Principal of Madras Law College, where he was regarded as effective in administrative and teaching roles. Following his academic career, he was appointed by the Government of Madras as a Member and subsequently Chairman of the Public Service Commission, and later served as Vice-Chancellor of Annamalai University. Ranga characterized Ruthnaswami as an able administrator across these roles and associated him with broader social reform efforts, alongside figures such as C. Rajagopalachari, particularly in relation to advocacy for social equality and the upliftment of disadvantaged groups. Ranga also referred to Ruthnaswami’s personal associations with contemporaries, including R. N. Arogyaswami Mudaliar, noting regular intellectual exchanges among them.

In Anjali, Lawrence Sundaram described Ruthnaswami as a committed scholar and writer with strong personal religious convictions. Sundaram highlighted his extensive reading across subjects, clarity of expression, and sustained intellectual activity into advanced age, stating that Ruthnaswami continued writing and engaging intellectually well into his nineties.

== Writings ==
Books written by Ruthnaswamy included,

- Philosophy of Mahatma Gandhi – (1923)
- The Political Philosophy of Mr. Gandhi (1922)
- The Revision of the Constitution (1928)
- The Making of the States (1932)
- Influences that made the British Administrative System in India (1939)
- Essays in Constitution Making (1946)
- India from the dawn: new aspects of an old story (1949)
- Principles and Practice of Public Administration (1953)
- Truth shall prevail (1957)
- What Every Citizen Ought to Know (1957)
- Everyman’s Constitution of India (1958)
- India after God (1964),
- Principles and Practice of Foreign Policy (1961)
- India after God Unknown Binding (1964),
- Violence: Cause and Cure (1969)
- Agenda for India (1971)
- Legislation: Principles and Practice (1974)

== Awards ==
- Order of the Indian Empire - Companion (CIE) - 1930
- Order of St. Gregory the Great - 1937
- Padma Bhushan award - 1968

== See also ==
- List of Rajya Sabha members from Tamil Nadu
- Padma Bhushan
