= R. N. Arogyasamy Mudaliar =

Indian politician (1870–1933)

Royapuram Nallaveeran Arogyaswamy Mudaliar Diwan Bahadur

Minister for Excise and Public Works Department (Madras Presidency)
- In office 4 December 1926 – 16 March 1928
- Premier: P. Subbarayan
- Governor: George Goschen, 2nd Viscount Goschen
- Preceded by: T. N. Sivagnanam Pillai
- Succeeded by: M. R. Sethuratnam Iyer

Personal details
- Born: 18 April 1870 Madras
- Died: January 30, 1933 (aged 62) Madras
- Party: Independent Nationalists
- Spouse: Amravati
- Education: Madras Christian College, College of Engineering (now Guindy College of Engineering) 1896
- Profession: Civil engineer

Diwan Bahadur Royapuram Nallaveeran Arogyaswamy Mudaliar (18 April 1870 – 30 January 1933) was an Indian politician and civil engineer who served as the Minister of Excise, Medical Administration and six other departments in the Madras Presidency from 1926 to 1928.

== Early life and education ==
Arogyasamy Mudaliar was born on 18 April 1870 to Sir R. N. Prakasam Mudaliar, who was an official of the provincial civil service after whom Prakasam Road in T. Nagar is named.

As a student of Madras Christian College, Arogyasamy Mudaliar performed brilliantly standing topmost in his class and securing kudos from the then Principal of the college - Rev.Dr.W. Miller. He went on to complete his Civil Engineering Degree in 1896 from Madras Engineering College (now named Guindy College of Engineering) which was earlier located in the palace of the Nawab of Carnatic. Incidentally the British Government established three engineering colleges in India - in Madras, Roorkee and Calcutta, and all three of them were meant exclusively for the study of Civil Engineering as irrigation and communication were of primary importance. After passing the exam at the top of his class, the Government of India offered Arogyaswamy Mudaliar the position of Executive Engineer overseeing nearly all districts in the present state of Tamil Nadu, Ganjam District in Orissa and entire Andhra Pradesh (excluding territories of the Nizam of Hyderabad, who was then the richest man in the world). He was hand picked to represent the country at the inauguration of the Panama Canal and at the opening on the Philadelphia Industrial Exhibition in the US. The study tour apart from visits to the United States and Panama included England, Spain, Portugal and Japan as mentioned in Passport no. 2 dated 25 September 1915 issued to him in South Arcot, Madras Province according to the National Archives in the UK. It was on his return he miraculously escaped certain death as the ship he was originally slated to return was sunk by Germany during the hostilities in World War I. In the post war years Arogyaswamy Mudaliar carried out improvements in the irrigation system of the River Krishna, was actively involved in the Mettur Dam, which became the largest dam in the world at the time of completion in 1934, Tungabhadra project, Pykara Project and the Lower Bhavani (river) Project. He did very useful work on the Cauvery Committee. The government recognised his work by promoting him to the position of Superintending Engineer in 1918 and conferring on him the title of Rao Bahadur and later in 1925 with the additional honour of Dewan Bahadur at the time of his retirement.

== In the Subbaroyan ministry ==
In the 1926 elections of the Madras Province, no party was able to win a clean majority in the Madras Legislative Council that had 132 elected members and 4 special members. The Swarajists, the single largest party in the assembly, were invited to form the government but they refused. The second largest party, the Justice Party, also refused to form the government as they did not have enough seats in the assembly. The government's choice of ministers fell on the Independent Nationalists. The Independent Nationalists headed by Dr. S Subbarayan accepted the responsibility with the hope of pressing India's case for self-determination from within the seat of government. As a result, an independent ministry was formed on 4 December 1926 with P. Subbarayan as the Minister in charge of the following portfolios:

- Education (other than European and Anglo-Indian Education
- Libraries, Museums and Zoological Gardens
- Light and Feeder Railways and Tramways within municipal areas
- Local self-government including village panchayats

Arogyaswamy Mudaliar as the Minister in charge of the following portfolios:

- Excise
- Medical Administration
- Fisheries
- Public Health and Sanitation
- Weights and Measures
- Statistics
- Pilgrimages within British India
- Adulteration of foodstuffs and other articles

A. Ranganatha Mudaliar as Minister in charge of the following portfolios:

- Agriculture
- Civil Veterinary department
- Cooperative Societies
- Development of industries
- Public Works
- Registration
- Religious and Charitable Endowments

As a Minister he pursued a progressive policy. His contributions to the debates in the (Legislative) Council was marked by deep study, careful analysis and understanding of the other side. He "indianised" the medical services by appointing PV Cherian as Superintendent of the Madras Medical College (Hospital)and Dr. A Lakshmanaswami Mudaliar as Superintendent, Women and Children's Hospital, Madras. He inaugurated the sanatorium at Madanapalle, Chitoor District which was named after him as Arogyavaram. However, a couple of years later, Arogyasamy Mudaliar resigned due to differences with the Chief Minister over the visit of the Simon Commission. The Simon Commission headed by Sir John Simon, a member of the British Liberal Party, was an all British Commission appointed by the Conservative government of Britain in 1927 with the instruction that it should visit India and investigate and report on the extent it would be desirable to introduce responsible government for the country.

The main reason for India's rejection of this (Commission) was that there was not a single Indian member in it. The Chief Minister, Dr. S. Subbarayan, believing that it would be worthwhile to co-operate with the Simon Commission while his two ministers, A.Ranganatha Mudaliar and R.N. Arogyaswami who resigned shared the (Legislative) Council's majority view that the Simon Commission must be boycotted.

== Later years ==
Arogyaswami Mudaliar while continuing to be a Member of the Legislative Council moved a cut motion on Excise demand in 1927 said that in addition to the Simon Commission question, the government's refusal to accept his proposal for total prohibition had also caused his resignation. Between 1919-20 and 1923-24 Madras Presidency was able to close only 65 liquor shops whereas, in the same period Bombay Presidency had closed down 4,409 shops, Bengal 5000 shops and United Provinces 2,400 shops Speaking on his vision of Swaraj (freedom) in the Madras Legislative Assembly "I would ask those who wish to attain Swaraj first of all to work to unify the people. Abolish caste distinctions, educate the poor...so that they will understand what politics is...(then) Swaraj will be yours for the asking". Side by side he was active in promoting medical development as a recent (2013) article in the Hindu newspaper, Chennai mentions that the Tambaram Sanatorium, Madras was inaugurated on 31 March 1929 was attended by Dewan Bahadur RN Arogyaswami Mudaliar, Minister for Development in the Dr. P. Subbarayan government and Rt. Hon. VS Srinivasa Sastri. He was an active member of the opposition (in the Legislative Council). His long official experience, his knowledge of inside councils made him a great acquisition to the Opposition benches. In 1929 the Committee of the Madras Legislative Council appointed Mr Arogyaswami Mudaliar as the chairman to investigate into the condition of ryots (farmers) in Andra, his Secretary was Prof. N.G. Ranga, Professor of Economics, Pachaiyappa's College, Chennai later a prominent Congressman. As important to his heart was the cause of swadeshi and he promoted "Buy Indian League" of Madras, he opposed separate electorates for minorities and welcomed the Poona Pact an agreement between Dr B.R. Ambedkar and Mahatma Gandhi in September 1932.In the following month he attended the Allahabad Unity Conference on November 3, 1932 called by Madan Mohan Malaviya some of the other participants included the future first President of India, Dr. Rajendra Prasad, but the cold winter of Allahabad affected his health and he came down with pleurisy due to pneumonia. Incidentally he was not sent to Britain by his father to compete in the Indian Civil Service due to this susceptibility to cold weather. After returning from the Allahabad Unity Conference he went to Mysore to preside over the Engineers Conference, soon after took to his bed with rheumatism culminating in his death He was in active touch with his profession and had a partnership with Dewan Bahadur A. V. Ramalinga Aiyer known as "Aiyar and Mudaliar", Aiyar was the first Indian Chief Engineer, Public Works Department. The firm was responsible for University Library Buildings and the Congress House in Royapettah, both in Madras.

== Death and legacy ==
Soon after the death of Arogyaswami Mudaliar, a half anna post card arrived from Mahatma Gandhi in Yerrawada Jail, Poona where he was incarcerated, expressing his anguish on the demise of a patriot. Among the several who paid their last respects were M. A. Muthiah Chettiar, Mohammad Usman, R. Ramachandra Rao, Mariadas Ruthnaswamy and T. R. Venkatarama Sastri.

His life was summed up by B. Shiva Rao then correspondent of The Hindu and Manchester Guardian later member of the Constituent Assembly of India, Member of the first Lok Sabha and Rajya Sabha, writer of several books on labour, politics and on the United Nations. Shiva Rao went on to say "Mr Arogyaswami's death will come as a great shock to his numerous friends and admirers all over the Presidency. He was a nationalist to the core and no one who came into contact with him could have failed to be struck with his deep sincerity and devotion to public duty". A poignant eulogy calling him an ardent nationalist and a revered patriot was delivered by Rt. Hon'able Srinivasa Sastri, known as one of the greatest speakers in the English language in his day, V. S. Srinivasa Sastri was also a member Madras Legislative Council, later Imperial Legislative Council and Council of State, a respected legislator who refused to become the Chief Minister of Madras Presidency as a leader of the Swarajist Party, who were in the majority in 1926.

== Notes ==
Preceded by T. N. Sivagnanam Pillai	Minister of Excise and Public Works Department (Madras Presidency); 3 December 1926 – 16 March 1928	Succeeded by M. R. Sethuratnam Iyer
