= Syed Ghouse Basha =

Indian politician

S. Syed Ghouse Basha is a politician from the Indian state of Tamil Nadu. He belongs to the Dravida Munnetra Kazhagam (DMK). He is a former Member of the Tamil Nadu Legislative Assembly who represented the Madurai Central (State Assembly Constituency). He was elected in a by-election in 2006 caused by the death of the previous member P. T. R. Palanivel Rajan.
He hails from Kazimar Street in Madurai and descendant of Kazi Syed Tajuddin hence a huqdar of Kazimar Big Mosque. He is former Deputy Mayor of Madurai Municipal Corporation and former member of Tamil Nadu Waqf Board.

== 2006 Assembly by-election ==
Election announcement:

Nominations started	16 Sep 2006
Last Date for filing nominations	23 Sep 2006
Last Date for withdrawal of nominations	27 Sep 2006
Date of Poll	11 Oct 2006
Counting of votes and declaration of results	17 Oct 2006

S.Syed Ghouse Basha, the Deputy Mayor of Madurai corporation was announced as the DMK candidate for the assembly bye election. V.Chandrasekar nominated as substitute.

Tamil Nadu state assembly bye election, 2006: Madurai-Central
Party	Candidate	Votes	%	±%
DMK	S. Syed Ghouse Basha	50,994		−
AIADMK	V.V.Rajan Sellappa	19,909		−
DMDK	M.R.Pannerselvam	17,394		−

== 2011 Assembly elections ==
Syed Ghouse Basha was again announced as Dravida Munnetra Kazhagam (DMK) candidate to contest from Madurai central. He lost to Sundararajan of the Desiya Murpokku Dravida Kazhagam from the All India Anna Dravida Munnetra Kazhagam alliance.

2011 Tamil Nadu Legislative Assembly election: Madurai (Central)
Party	Candidate	Votes	%	±%
DMDK	R. Sundarrajan	76,063	52.77	+39.99
DMK	Syed Ghouse Basha	56,503	39.20	−6.64
BJP	A. Sasikumar	3,708	2.57	New
Independent	G. Srinivasan	2,569	1.78	New
Independent	K. M. Muthuraj	2,140	1.48	New
Margin of victory		19,560	13.57	+5.94
Turnout		192,815	74.76	+4.98
DMDK gain from DMK		Swing	+6.93	
