= Sundarrajan =

Sundarrajan is a South Indian surname. Notable people with the surname include:

- Major Sundarrajan (1935–2003), Tamil actor
- R. Sundarrajan (born 1950), Tamil director and actor
- R. Sundarrajan (politician) (died 2020), Indian politician

== See also ==
- Sundar Raj (active 1967–present), Indian actor
- R. Sunder Raj, aka Sunder Raj or Sundar Raj, Malayalam film producer, known for the 1933 silent film Marthanda Varma
- Sunder Raj, an Indian fisherman who was killed in 2006 by Sentinelese people
