= A. Ranganatha Mudaliar =

Indian politician and theosophist

Arcot Ranganatha Mudaliar

Minister of Public Health and Excise (Madras Presidency)
- In office 4 December 1926 – 16 March 1928
- Premier: P. Subbarayan
- Governor: George Goschen, 2nd Viscount Goschen
- Preceded by: A. P. Patro
- Succeeded by: S. Muthiah Mudaliar

Personal details
- Born: 26 June 1879 Bellary, Madras Presidency
- Died: 8 July 1950 (aged 71)
- Party: Independent Party, Indian National Congress
- Education: Madras Christian College, Madras Law College
- Occupation: legislator
- Profession: lawyer

Arcot Ranganatha Mudaliar (29 June 1879 – 8 July 1950) was an Indian politician and theosophist from Bellary. He served as the Minister of Public Health and Excise for the Madras Presidency from 1926 to 1928.

== Early life ==
Ranganatha Mudaliar was born on 29 June 1879, in an Arcot Mudaliar family of Madras Presidency. Ranganatha Mudaliar had his schooling in Madras and graduated from Madras Christian College and Madras Law College. Mudaliar joined government service in 1901 and served as Deputy Collector of Bellary. Later, he was influenced by theosophy and became a follower of Annie Besant.

== Public life ==
Ranganatha Mudaliar established the Young Men's Indian Association in 1914 and constructed the Gokhale Hall in 1915. Mudaliar accompanied Besant to London in 1924 as a part of the National Convention delegation.

== Politics ==
Ranganatha Mudaliar joined politics at the instance of the Raja of Panagal of the Justice Party. Ranganatha Mudaliar contested the Madras Legislative Council from Bellary and was elected to the assembly. Mudaliar served as the Minister of Public Health and Excise in the government of P. Subbarayan from 1926 to 1928, when he resigned protesting the arrival of the Simon Commission. Ranganatha Mudaliar was succeeded by S. Muthiah Mudaliar.

Following his resignation, Ranganatha Mudaliar joined the Indian National Congress and served as the first Commissioner of the Thirumala-Tirupathi devasthanam board from 1935 to 1939.
