= Sankaran =

Sankaran may refer to:

- Balu Sankaran, Professor, scientist and recipient of Padma Shri and Padma Vibushan awards
- C. Sankaran Nair CIE (1857–1934), the President of the Indian National Congress in 1897
- Gnani Sankaran (born 1954), popular writer in the Tamil language
- Jayanthan Sankaran Nampoothiri, 18th century Diwan of the Travancore kingdom
- Kalamandalam Sankaran Embranthiri (1944–2007), one of the most popular Kathakali musicians
- N. Sankaran Nair, Indian director of Malayalam movies
- M. K. Sankaran Namboothiri (born 1971), Carnatic classical music vocalist from Kerala
- Trichy Sankaran (born 1942), South Indian percussionist, composer, scholar, and educator
- V. Sankaran, Indian politician and former Member of the Legislative Assembly of Tamil Nadu
- Ra. Sankaran (1931 – 2023), Indian actor and director.
