= Madurai Central Assembly constituency =

One of the 234 State Legislative Assembly Constituencies in Tamil Nadu, in India

Coordinates: 9.923°N 78.120°E

Madurai (Central)
- Constituency No. 193 for the Tamil Nadu Legislative Assembly

Constituency details
- Country: India
- Region: South India
- State: Tamil Nadu
- District: Madurai
- Lok Sabha constituency: Madurai
- Established: 1957
- Total electors: 1,99,725
- Reservation: None

Member of Legislative Assembly
- 17th Tamil Nadu Legislative Assembly
- Incumbent Madhar Badhurudeen
- Party: TVK
- Elected year: 2026

Madurai Central is a legislative assembly constituency in the Indian state of Tamil Nadu. It is one of the 234 State Legislative Assembly Constituencies in Tamil Nadu, in India. Elections and winners from this constituency are listed below.

== Members of Legislative Assembly ==
=== Madras State ===
Year	Winner	Party
1957	V. Sankaran	Indian National Congress
1962	V. Sankaran	Indian National Congress
1967	C. Govindarajan	Dravida Munnetra Kazhagam

=== Tamil Nadu ===
Year	Winner	Party
1971	K. Thirupathy	Dravida Munnetra Kazhagam
1977	N. Lakshmi Narayanan	All India Anna Dravida Munnetra Kazhagam
1980	P. Nedumaran	Independent
1984	A. Deiyvanayagam	Indian National Congress
1989	S. Paulraj	Dravida Munnetra Kazhagam
1991	A. Deiyvanayagam	Indian National Congress
1996	A. Deiyvanayagam	Tamil Maanila Congress
2001	M. A. Hakeem	Tamil Maanila Congress
2006	P. T. R. Palanivel Rajan	Dravida Munnetra Kazhagam
2006*	S. Syed Ghouse Basha	Dravida Munnetra Kazhagam
2011	R. Sundarrajan	Desiya Murpokku Dravida Kazhagam
2016	Dr. Palanivel Thiagarajan	Dravida Munnetra Kazhagam
2021	Dr. Palanivel Thiagarajan	Dravida Munnetra Kazhagam
2026	Madhar Badhurudeen	Tamilaga Vettri Kazhagam

== Election results ==
Vote share of winning candidates
2026	42.68%
2021	49.47%
2016	42.55%
2011	52.77%
2006-07	56.11%
2006	45.83%
2001	46.53%
1996	46.69%
1991	62.27%
1989	39.73%
1984	50.76%
1980	58.13%
1977	39.90%
1971	48.90%
1967	62.86%
1962	54.60%

=== 2026 ===
2026 Tamil Nadu Legislative Assembly election: Madurai Central
Party	Candidate	Votes	%	±%
TVK	Madhar Badhurudeen	63,414	42.68	New
DMK	Palanivel Thiaga Rajan	44,286	29.80	▼19.67
PNK (AIADMK)	Sundar C	33,298	22.57	▼3.80
NOTA	NOTA	656	0.44	▼0.53
Margin of victory		19,128	12.87	▼10.22
Turnout		1,48,586	74.4	
Registered electors		1,99,725		
TVK gain from DMK		Swing	▲42.68	

=== 2021 ===
2021 Tamil Nadu Legislative Assembly election: Madurai Central
Party	Candidate	Votes	%	±%
DMK	Dr. Palanivel Thiagarajan	73,205	49.47	▲6.92
AIADMK	N. Jothi Muthuramalingam	39,029	26.37	▼12.38
MNM	B. Mani	14,495	9.79	New
Independent	Kremmer Suresh	4,907	3.32	New
SDPI	G. S. Sikkandar Batcha	3,347	2.26	▲1.15
Independent	Other independent candidates	1,042	0.70	
Others	Other party candidates	749	0.51	
NOTA	None of the above	1,441	0.97	▼0.79
Margin of victory		34,176	23.09	▲19.30
Turnout		147,989	61.17	▼4.03
DMK hold		Swing	+6.92	

=== 2016 ===
2016 Tamil Nadu Legislative Assembly election: Madurai (Central)
Party	Candidate	Votes	%	±%
DMK	Dr. Palanivel Thiagarajan	64,662	42.55	+3.35
AIADMK	M. Jeyabal	58,900	38.75	New
DMDK	D. Siva Muthukumar	11,235	7.39	−45.37
BJP	M. Karthik Prabu	6,926	4.56	+1.98
NOTA	None Of The Above	2,683	1.77	New
Margin of victory		5,762	3.80	−9.78
Turnout		151,982	65.20	−9.56
DMK gain from DMDK		Swing	-10.22	

=== 2011 ===
2011 Tamil Nadu Legislative Assembly election: Madurai (Central)
Party	Candidate	Votes	%	±%
DMDK	R. Sundarrajan	76,063	52.77	+39.99
DMK	Syed Ghouse Basha	56,503	39.20	−6.64
BJP	A. Sasikumar	3,708	2.57	New
Independent	G. Srinivasan	2,569	1.78	New
Independent	K. M. Muthuraj	2,140	1.48	New
Margin of victory		19,560	13.57	+5.94
Turnout		192,815	74.76	+4.98
DMDK gain from DMK		Swing	+6.93	

=== 2006 Bypoll ===
Tamil Nadu assembly by-election, 2006-07: Madurai Central
Party	Candidate	Votes	%	±%
DMK	Syed Ghouse Basha	50,994	56.11%	+10.28%
AIADMK	V. V. Rajan Chellappa	19,909	21.91%	−16.29%
DMDK	M.R. Paneerselvam	17,394	19.14%	+6.36%
DMK hold		Swing		
Majority		31,085	n/a	n/a
Turnout		90,887	68.72%	n/a

=== 2006 ===
2006 Tamil Nadu Legislative Assembly election: Madurai (Central)
Party	Candidate	Votes	%	±%
DMK	P. T. R. Palanivel Rajan	43,185	45.83%	−0.5
AIADMK	S. T. K. Jakkaiyan	35,992	38.20%	New
DMDK	R. Sundarrajan	12,038	12.78%	New
Independent	P. Jeyakumar	949	1.01%	New
Margin of victory		7,193	7.63%	7.44%
Turnout		94,224	69.79%	17.70%
Registered electors		135,020		
DMK gain from TMC(M)		Swing	-0.70%	

=== 2001 ===
2001 Tamil Nadu Legislative Assembly election: Madurai (Central)
Party	Candidate	Votes	%	±%
TMC(M)	M. A. Hakeem	34,393	46.53%	New
DMK	S. Paulraj	34,246	46.33%	New
MDMK	S. Asaithambi	2,448	3.31%	New
JD(S)	K. John Moses	802	1.09%	New
Margin of victory		147	0.20%	−21.84%
Turnout		73,912	52.09%	−9.66%
Registered electors		141,907		
TMC(M) hold		Swing	-0.16%	

=== 1996 ===
1996 Tamil Nadu Legislative Assembly election: Madurai (Central)
Party	Candidate	Votes	%	±%
TMC(M)	A. Deivanayagam	38,010	46.69%	New
JP	V. S. Chandraleka	20,069	24.65%	New
INC	T. Thangaraj	11,841	14.55%	−47.73
CPI(M)	N. Nanmaran	7,191	8.83%	New
Independent	M. S. Udayamoorthy	1,289	1.58%	New
BJP	Rajamanickam	1,100	1.35%	New
KNMK	P. Balaravindran	1,001	1.23%	New
Margin of victory		17,941	22.04%	−5.08%
Turnout		81,403	61.75%	7.06%
Registered electors		135,876		
TMC(M) gain from INC		Swing	-15.58%	

=== 1991 ===
1991 Tamil Nadu Legislative Assembly election: Madurai (Central)
Party	Candidate	Votes	%	±%
INC	A. Deivanayagam	47,325	62.27%	+35.77
DMK	M. Tamil Kudimagan	26,717	35.16%	−4.57
JP	K. A. Ingarasaal	486	0.64%	New
Margin of victory		20,608	27.12%	13.89%
Turnout		75,994	54.68%	−12.92%
Registered electors		141,435		
INC gain from DMK		Swing	22.55%	

=== 1989 ===
1989 Tamil Nadu Legislative Assembly election: Madurai (Central)
Party	Candidate	Votes	%	±%
DMK	S. Paulraj	33,484	39.73%	New
INC	A. Deivanayagam	22,338	26.50%	−24.26
AIADMK	S. Raghavanandam	11,243	13.34%	New
CPI	K. T. K. Tahngamani	11,097	13.17%	New
TNC(K)	Pazha Nedumara	4,875	5.78%	New
Margin of victory		11,146	13.22%	10.45%
Turnout		84,282	67.60%	−1.26%
Registered electors		126,260		
DMK gain from INC		Swing	-11.03%	

=== 1984 ===
1984 Tamil Nadu Legislative Assembly election: Madurai (Central)
Party	Candidate	Votes	%	±%
INC	A. Deivanayagam	41,272	50.76%	New
TNC(K)	Pazha Nedumara	39,012	47.98%	New
Margin of victory		2,260	2.78%	−15.20%
Turnout		81,308	68.86%	9.67%
Registered electors		121,962		
INC gain from Independent		Swing	-7.37%	

=== 1980 ===
1980 Tamil Nadu Legislative Assembly election: Madurai (Central)
Party	Candidate	Votes	%	±%
Independent	Pazha Nedumara	45,700	58.13%	New
DMK	P. T. R. Palanivel Rajan	31,566	40.15%	+20.23
BJP	R. V. Seshachari	1,077	1.37%	New
Margin of victory		14,134	17.98%	0.36%
Turnout		78,617	59.19%	4.98%
Registered electors		133,812		
Independent gain from AIADMK		Swing	18.23%	

=== 1977 ===
1977 Tamil Nadu Legislative Assembly election: Madurai (Central)
Party	Candidate	Votes	%	±%
AIADMK	N. Lakshmi Narayanan	29,399	39.90%	New
INC	A. Rathinam	16,420	22.28%	−21.54
DMK	S. Pandy	14,676	19.92%	−28.99
JP	S. Sukumaran	12,780	17.34%	New
Margin of victory		12,979	17.61%	12.53%
Turnout		73,687	54.21%	−14.59%
Registered electors		137,125		
AIADMK gain from DMK		Swing	-9.01%	

=== 1971 ===
1971 Tamil Nadu Legislative Assembly election: Madurai (Central)
Party	Candidate	Votes	%	±%
DMK	K. Thirupathy	30,905	48.90%	−13.95
INC	Pazha Nedumara	27,695	43.82%	+7.62
CPI(M)	V. Karmegam	4,177	6.61%	New
Independent	Keelamathur Krishnier	418	0.66%	New
Margin of victory		3,210	5.08%	−21.58%
Turnout		63,195	68.79%	−6.19%
Registered electors		96,645		
DMK hold		Swing	-13.95%	

=== 1967 ===
1967 Madras Legislative Assembly election: Madurai (Central)
Party	Candidate	Votes	%	±%
DMK	C. Govindarajan	39,566	62.86%	New
INC	V. Sankaran	22,787	36.20%	−18.4
ABJS	P. Periasam	592	0.94%	New
Margin of victory		16,779	26.66%	−2.23%
Turnout		62,945	74.99%	1.99%
Registered electors		86,462		
DMK gain from INC		Swing	8.26%	

=== 1962 ===
1962 Madras Legislative Assembly election: Madurai (Central)
Party	Candidate	Votes	%	±%
INC	V. Sankaran	32,801	54.60%	New
AIFB	S. Devasahayam	15,445	25.71%	New
Independent	A. V. Ayyavoo	8,229	13.70%	New
PSP	Bahulayan	3,601	5.99%	New
Margin of victory		17,356	28.89%	
Turnout		60,076	73.00%	
Registered electors		84,596		
INC win (new seat)				
