= Paulraj =

Paulraj is a surname. Notable people with the surname include:

- Arogyaswami Paulraj (born 1944), Indian-American electrical engineer
- S. Paulraj, Indian politician
- Saroja Savithri Paulraj, Sri Lankan politician
