= Madhar Badhurudeen =

Indian politician

Member of the Tamil Nadu Legislative Assembly
- Incumbent
- Assumed office 11 May 2026
- Preceded by: Palanivel Thiaga Rajan
- Constituency: Madurai Central

Personal details
- Party: Tamilaga Vettri Kazhagam
- Profession: Politician

Madhar Badhurudeen is an Indian politician from Tamil Nadu. He is a member of the Tamil Nadu Legislative Assembly from Madurai Central representing Tamilaga Vettri Kazhagam.

== Political career ==
Badhurudeen won the Madurai Central seat in the 2026 Tamil Nadu Legislative Assembly election as a candidate of Tamilaga Vettri Kazhagam. He received 63,414 votes and defeated Palanivel Thiaga Rajan of the Dravida Munnetra Kazhagam by a margin of 19,128 votes.
