= A. Subbarayalu Reddiar =

Indian politician (1855–1921)

Mp.Agaram Subbarayalu Reddiar

1st First Minister of Madras Presidency
- In office 17 December 1920 – 11 July 1921
- Governor: Freeman Freeman-Thomas, 1st Marquess of Willingdon
- Preceded by: Position established
- Succeeded by: Raja of Panagal

Personal details
- Born: 15 October 1855
- Died: November 1921 (age 66) British Raj
- Party: Justice Party
- Occupation: Politician
- Profession: lawyer

Diwan Bahadur Agaram Subbarayalu Reddiar (b. 15 October 1855 – d. November 1921), born in Malayaperumal Agaram, was a landlord and the inaugural First Minister of Madras Presidency from 17 December 1920 to 11 July 1921.

Subbarayalu Reddiar was born in a Reddiar family of South Arcot in 1855. He studied law in the West. On his return to India, Subbarayalu Reddiar involved himself in district politics of South Arcot and served as a district board president. Initially, he joined the Indian National Congress but left the party in 1916 to join the Justice Party. When the Justice Party was elected to power in the Madras Presidency in the first general elections in November 1920, Subbarayalu Reddiar was chosen as the First Minister. Thus, Subbarayalu Reddiar is the inaugural First Minister of Madras Presidency.

Subbarayalu Reddiar served as First Minister till 11 July 1921 when he resigned on grounds of health. He died soon afterwards.

== Early life ==
Agaram Subbarayalu Reddiar was born in a rich landlord family domiciled in South Arcot district of Madras Presidency on 15 October 1855. He studied in Presidency College, Chennai, along with Theagaroya Chetty. Later he studied law in the United Kingdom.

== Early political career ==
He became a member of the Municiapl Council of Cuddalore in 1904. Subbarayalu Reddiar served as the President of Cuddalore taluk Board in 1912. In 1917 he became the chair of South Arcot District Board. He later became the first First Minister of Madras Presidency, present-day state of Tamil Nadu.

He received the title of Rao Bahadur in 1911 for his services in the Municipal of Cuddalore. He was promoted to the honor of Diwan Bahadur in 1916.

== First Minister of Madras ==
At the end of November 1920, the first general elections were held to the Madras Legislative Assembly as per the Montford Reforms. The Indian National Congress, a part of its policy during the Non-Cooperation Movement boycotted the elections. As a result, the Justice Party swept to power winning 63 of the 98 Assembly seats to which elections were conducted. Among the nominated members, it had a strength of 18 adding up to a total of 81 members in a chamber of 127.

Following the success of the Justice Party in the 1920 elections, Lord Willingdon invited Sir Theagaroya Chetty to form the Government. However, he passed on the mantle to Subbarayalu Reddiar. Subbarayalu Reddiar assumed office as First Minister on 17 December 1920 and held the portfolios of education, public works, excise and registration in the new government. The first session of the assembly was inaugurated by Duke of Connaught on 13 January 1921. On 14 February 1921, three new Council Secretaries were appointed by the Justice party Government. However, Subbarayalu Reddiar resigned soon afterwards on grounds of health.

Subbarayalu Reddiar's Cabinet
Portfolio	Minister
Education, Excise and Public works	A. Subbarayalu Reddiar (Also First Minister)
Local Self-Government	Panaganti Ramarayaningar
Development	Kurma Venkata Reddy Naidu
Source: Encyclopaedia of Political Parties

== Death ==
Subbarayalu Reddiar died in November 1921.

== Notes ==
Preceded by Post created	First Minister of Madras Presidency; 17 December 1920 – 11 July 1921	Succeeded by Raja of Panagal
