= A. Deivanayagam =

Indian politician (1934/1935 – 2023)

Member of the Tamil Nadu Legislative Assembly for Madurai Central
- In office 1984–2001
- Parliamentary group: Indian National Congress
- Parliamentary group: Indian National Congress
- Parliamentary group: Tamil Maanila Congress (Moopanar)

Personal details
- Born: 1934/1935
- Died: 2 December 2023 (aged 88) Madurai, Tamil Nadu, India

A. Deivanayagam (1934/1935 – 2 December 2023) was an Indian politician.

== Early life ==
Deivanayagam was born in 1934 or 1935.

== Career ==
He was a former Member of the Legislative Assembly of Tamil Nadu. He was elected to the Tamil Nadu Legislative Assembly as an Indian National Congress candidate from Madurai Central constituency in 1984, and 1991 elections and as a Tamil Maanila Congress (Moopanar) candidate in 1996 election.

== Death ==
Deivanayagam died on 2 December 2023, at the age of 88.
