= M. R. Sethuratnam Iyer =

Indian politician

Manathattai Rangarathnam Sethuratnam Iyer

Minister of Development (Madras Presidency)
- In office 16 March 1928 – 27 October 1930
- Premier: P. Subbarayan
- Governor: George Goschen, 2nd Viscount Goschen, Sir Norman Marjoribanks
- Preceded by: R. N. Arogyasamy Mudaliar
- Succeeded by: P. T. Rajan

Personal details
- Born: 1888 Trichinopoly, Madras Presidency
- Died: Unknown
- Party: Swarajya Party
- Education: St. Joseph College, Trichinopoly
- Occupation: legislator

Manathattai Rangarathnam Sethuratnam Iyer (born 2 January 1888 - Unknown) was an Indian politician who served as the Minister of Development in the Madras Presidency from 16 March 1928 to 27 October 1930.

== Early life ==
Sethuratnam Iyer was born in Tiruchirappalli in 1888. He had his schooling at Kulittalai school and National High School, Trichinopoly, and graduated from St Joseph's College, Tiruchirappalli.

== Political career ==
Sethuratnam Iyer started his political career by joining the Swaraj Party and served as the President of the taluk board, Trichinopoly. He was elected to the Madras Legislative Council in the 1920, 1923 and 1926 elections from the Trichinopoly General Rural constituency.

== As Minister of Development ==
In 1928, a resolution was passed by the Swaraj Party opposing the Simon Commission. While Premier P. Subbarayan opposed the resolution, his ministers supported it. Subbarayan requested his ministers to resign and submitted his own resignation to the Governor. However, the Governor reinstated Subbarayan as Premier and requested the Justice Party to support the Government. Subbarayan requested Sethuratnam Iyer to join his ministry. Sethuratnam Iyer accepted the offer and served as the Minister of Development despite being labelled as a traitor by the Swaraj Party.

== Notes ==
Preceded by R. N. Arogyasamy Mudaliar	Minister of Development (Madras Presidency); 16 March 1928 – 27 October 1930	Succeeded by P. T. Rajan
