= Mohammad Usman of Madras =

Indian politician, hakim and socialite (1884-1960)

Khan Bahadur Sir Mohammad Usman KCSI KCIE
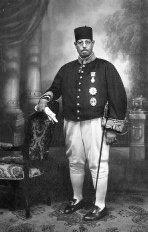
- Governor of Madras Presidency 1934 official picture

Member of the Executive Council of the Viceroy of India
- In office 1942–1947
- Monarch: George VI of the United Kingdom
- Governors-General: Victor Hope, 2nd Marquess of Linlithgow Archibald Wavell, 1st Earl Wavell Louis Mountbatten, 1st Earl Mountbatten of Burma
- Succeeded by: None

Member of the Defence Council of India
- In office 1940–1941
- Monarch: George VI

Governor of Madras Presidency (Acting)
- In office 16 April 1934 – 16 August 1934
- Premier: Raja of Bobbili
- Preceded by: George Frederick Stanley
- Succeeded by: George Frederick Stanley

Minister of Home (Madras Presidency)
- In office 1932–1934
- Premier: Raja of Bobbili
- Governor: George Frederick Stanley

Member of the Executive Council of the Governor of Madras
- In office 1925–1930
- Premier: Raja of Panagal; P. Subbarayan
- Governor: George Goschen, 2nd Viscount Goschen; Sir Norman Majoribanks; George Frederick Stanley
- Succeeded by: None

Personal details
- Born: 1884 Tanjore, British India
- Died: 1 February 1960 (aged 75–76) Madras, India
- Education: Madras Christian College
- Occupation: Lawyer, hakim
- Profession: Politician

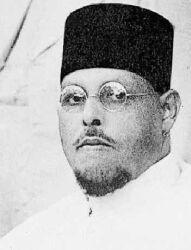
Khan Bagadur Sir Mohammad Usman KCSI KCIE

Khan Bahadur Sir Mohammad Usman KCSI KCIE (1884 – 1 February 1960) was an Indian politician, hakim and socialite who served as the Minister of Home for the Madras Presidency in the Justice Party government of the Raja of Bobbili and as the first Indian acting Governor of Madras from 16 May 1934 to 16 August 1934. His name is often written Muhammad Usman.

Usman was born into an aristocratic family of Tanjore in the Madras Presidency in 1884. He graduated from Madras Christian College and joined the Justice Party. He was elected to the Madras Legislative Council and later, to the Governor's executive council. Usman served as the member of posts and air in the Viceroy's Executive Council between 1942 and 1947. He died in 1960 at the age of 76. He was a part-time hakim or doctor in Unani medicine and used his influential position in the provincial administration to promote indigenous systems of medicine.

In person, Usman was both tall and very heavy. He was once described by V. S. Srinivasa Sastri as having a "magnificent frame", and Sastri's biographer says he was "of gargantuan size".

== Early life ==
Usman was born to Mohammad Yakub who belonged to an aristocratic family of Tanjore, Madras Presidency in 1884. Usman graduated from the Madras Christian College and joined the South Indian Liberal Federation. Usman practised Unani medicine and acquired a reputation as an efficient physician.

== Political positions ==
Usman was elected to the Madras Legislative Council as a Justice Party candidate in 1920 and served as a legislator from 1920 to 1923. Usman served as the President of the Corporation of Madras in 1924–25 and as the Shera of Madras in 1924. In October 1921, the Raja of Panagal, the Chief Minister of Madras, established a committee on Indigenous Systems of Medicine. He appointed Usman, the Secretary of the committee. In 1922, this Committee concluded that Ayurveda was based on genuine scientific theories and noted that its practice has been waning over the years. On 30 March 1925, Usman was appointed member of the executive council of the Governor of Madras. He was elected president of the Muhammedan Education Association of South India in 1930.

When the Raja of Bobbili took over as the Chief Minister or Premier of the Madras Presidency, Usman was made the Minister of Home in the provincial government. However, Usman resigned in 1934 recommending A. T. Panneerselvam as his successor. Muslims of the Madras Presidency felt betrayed that Usman had not recommended a Muslim for the post and strongly opposed the candidature of Panneerselvam who was a Christian. Violent Muslim-Christian riots erupted in the province. Though the riots were eventually quelled, the incidents radicalized public opinion, both Muslim and Christian, against the Justice Party.

In 1935, Usman became the first Indian President of the Rotary Club of Madras.

== As Acting Governor of Madras Presidency ==
Usman served as the acting Governor of Madras from 16 May 1934 to 16 August 1934. He was the first Indian to act as the Governor of Madras.

== Member of the Viceroy's Executive Council ==
The British trusted Usman and considered him loyal. He served as a member of the Indian Defence Council in 1941–42 and as the Vice-Chancellor of Madras University from 1940 to 1942.

On 2 July 1942, the Viceroy of India, Lord Linlithgow, expanded his Executive Council to nineteen members, bringing in Usman, Sir C. P. Ramaswami Iyer, B. R. Ambedkar, Sir Jogendra Singh, and Sir J. P. Srivastava. This took the number of Indian members of the Council to fourteen, with five Europeans. Usman was made the member for Posts and Air.

Usman's political views, according to the next Viceroy, Wavell, were "such that even a hardened Tory might regard as reactionary", and Wavell later noted in his journal that Usman "believed that God never meant India to be independent".

At a conference of Post Masters General shortly after the end of the Second World War, Usman said of the need to improve postal and telegraph services "We have won the War. We have now to win the peace."

== Death ==
Usman died on 1 February 1960 at the age of 76.

== Honors ==
Usman was knighted in the 1928 Birthday Honours and made a Knight Commander of the Order of the Indian Empire in the 1933 New Year Honours. On 14 June 1945, he was appointed a KCSI.

Usman Road, a thoroughfare in T. Nagar, Chennai is named after him.
