= Palanivel Thiaga Rajan =

Indian politician (born 1966)

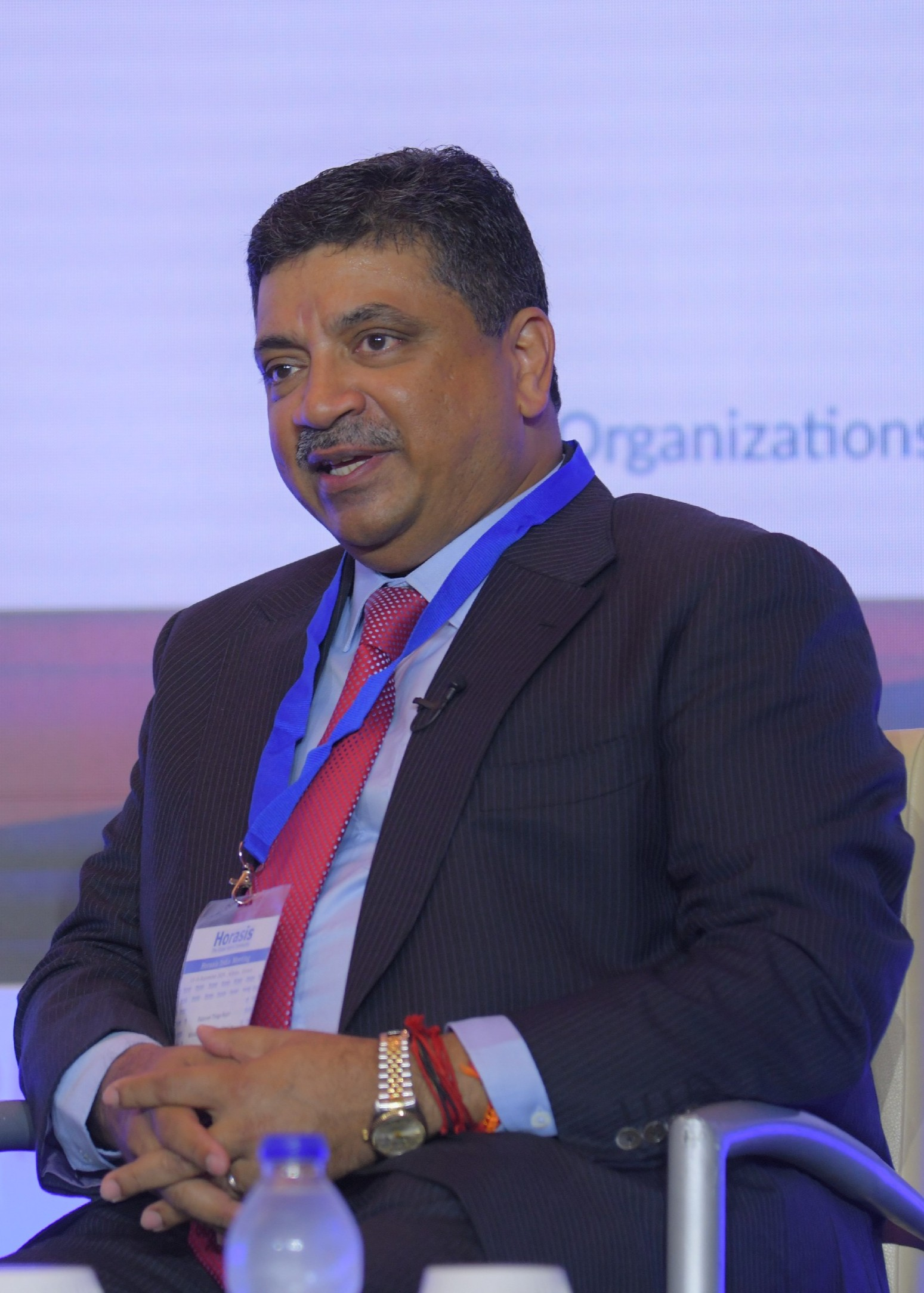

Minister for Information Technology and Digital Services Tamil Nadu
- In office 11 May 2023 – 5 May 2026
- Chief Minister: M. K. Stalin
- Preceded by: Mano Thangaraj
- Succeeded by: R. Kumar

Finance Minister in The Government of Tamil Nadu
- In office 7 May 2021 – 10 May 2023
- Chief Minister: M. K. Stalin
- Preceded by: O. Panneerselvam
- Succeeded by: Thangam Thennarasu

Member of Tamil Nadu Legislative Assembly
- In office 25 May 2016 – 4 May 2026
- Preceded by: R. Sundarrajan
- Succeeded by: Madhar Badhurudeen
- Constituency: Madurai Central

Personal details
- Born: 7 March 1966 (age 60) Madurai, Madras State, India
- Party: Dravida Munnetra Kazhagam
- Spouse: Margaret Thiagarajan
- Relations: P. T. Rajan (grandfather)
- Children: 2
- Parent(s): Rukmani (mother); P. T. R. Palanivel Rajan (father)
- Education: The Lawrence School, Lovedale; National Institute of Technology, Tiruchirappalli (BTech (Hons)); University at Buffalo (M.S., PhD); MIT Sloan School of Management (MBA)
- Website: https://www.ptrmadurai.com/

Palanivel Thiaga Rajan (born 7 March 1966) is an Indian politician who served as Minister of Finance and Minister of Information, Technology and Digital Services of the Indian state of Tamil Nadu between 2021 and 2026. He was elected to the Tamil Nadu Legislative Assembly in 2016 and 2021 from Madurai Central.

== Early life ==
He is the son of P. T. R. Palanivel Rajan, a prominent politician who served as the 9th speaker of the Tamil Nadu Legislative Assembly and Rukmani. His grandfather, P. T. Rajan, was the First Minister of Madras Presidency from 4 April 1936, to 24 August 1936.

Following his schooling at The Lawrence School, Lovedale, and Vikaasa School, Madurai, he graduated with a degree in chemical engineering from the National Institute of Technology, Tiruchirappalli (formerly, Regional Engineering College, Tiruchirappalli). He obtained a master's degree in operations research and a Ph.D. in human factors engineering/engineering psychology at University at Buffalo. He then completed his MBA in financial management at MIT Sloan School of Management. He is a named inventor on a patent held by Barclays Capital Inc.

== Corporate career ==
He began his career in 1990 as an independent consultant in Operations and Systems Improvement. In 2001 he joined Lehman Brothers Holdings Inc. as Trader and Co-Portfolio Manager. He quit Lehman Brothers Holdings Inc. as Head Of Offshore Capital Markets in the year 2008. He then worked for Standard Chartered Bank, Singapore in the Global Capital Markets division. He quit Standard Chartered Bank as managing director, Financial Markets Sales in 2014.

== Political career ==
Thiagarajan was elected as the Member of the Legislative Assembly (MLA) from Madurai Central Assembly constituency in the 2016 Tamil Nadu Legislative Assembly election. He was re-elected in the 2021 Tamil Nadu Legislative Assembly election.

He was the Minister of Finance and Human Resources Management of Tamil Nadu from 7 May 2021 to 10 May 2023. He has released a White Paper on Tamil Nadu's finances after a long time. In a cabinet reshuffle on 11 May 2023 by the Tamil Nadu government, he was made the Minister of Information Technology and Digital Services and served till the end of the 16th Tamil Nadu Assembly.

== Ministry ==
| Designation | Portfolio | Party | Ministry | Tenure | |
|---|---|---|---|---|---|
| Designation | Portfolio | Party | Ministry | Took office | Left office |
| Minister of Information Technology & Digital Services | Information Technology and Digital Services | DMK | M.K.Stalin | 11 May 2023 | 10 May 2026 |
| Minister of Finance and Human Resources Management | Finance, Planning, Personal and Administrative Reforms, Pensions and Pension allowances. | DMK | M.K.Stalin | 7 May 2021 | 10 May 2023 |

== Electoral performance ==
Tamil Nadu Legislative elections
| Elections | Constituency | Party | Result | % Votes |
|---|---|---|---|---|
| 2016 Tamil Nadu Legislative Assembly election | Madurai Central | DMK | Won | 42.55% |
| 2021 Tamil Nadu Legislative Assembly election | Madurai Central | DMK | Won | 49.47% |
| 2026 Tamil Nadu Legislative Assembly election | Madurai Central | DMK | Lost | 29.80% |

== Personal life ==
He married Margaret, whom he met at University at Buffalo where he was pursuing his Ph.D. while she was pursuing her Master's. They have two sons.
