= S. Muthiah Mudaliar =

Indian politician and legislator (1883–1953)

Sami Muthiah Mudaliar CIE
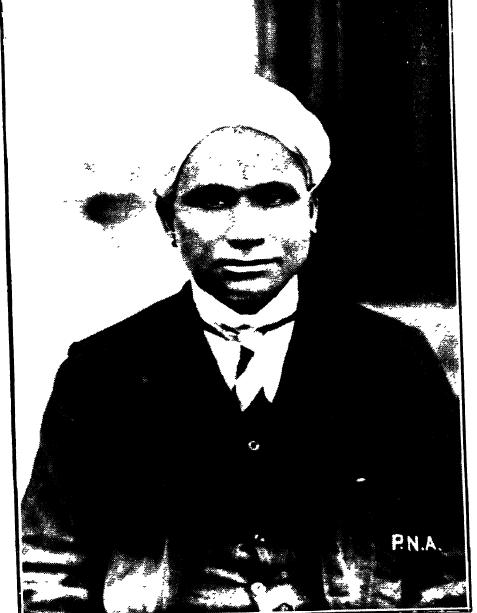

Minister of Education and Excise (Madras Presidency)
- In office 16 March 1928 – 27 October 1930
- Premier: P. Subbarayan
- Governor: George Goschen, 2nd Viscount Goschen, Sir Norman Marjoribanks (acting)
- Preceded by: A. Ranganatha Mudaliar
- Succeeded by: S. Kumaraswami Reddiar

Personal details
- Born: 1883 Kumbakonam, Madras Presidency
- Died: 15 July 1953 (aged 69–70)
- Party: Justice Party, Indian National Congress (Swarajya Party)
- Education: Government College, Kumbakonam, Law College, Madras
- Occupation: legislator
- Profession: lawyer

Sami Muthiah Mudaliar CIE (1883 – 15 July 1953) was an Indian politician and legislator of the Justice Party and later, the Swarajya Party and an independent minister in the Madras Presidency. He is largely remembered for introducing the Communal Government Order implementing reservations in the Presidency.

Muthiah Mudaliar was born in Kumbakonam. He studied and graduated in law and commenced practice as a lawyer. He joined the Justice Party and later, the Swarajya Party and served as legislator from 1923 to 1930. From 1928 to 1930, he served as the Minister of Education and Excise in P. Subbarayan's government. He returned to the Justice Party in the late twenties and participated in the Madras 1938 Anti-Hindi agitations.

Muthiah Mudaliar was a close friend and associate of E. V. Ramasami.

== Early life ==
Muthiah Mudaliar was born in Kumbakonam, Madras Presidency in 1883. Muthiah graduated from Government College, Kumbakonam and Law College, Madras and practised as a lawyer at the Madras High Court before joining the Justice Party.

== Politics ==
In 1923, Muthiah left the Justice Party and joined the Swarajya Party. He participated in the 1923 assembly elections and was elected to the Madras Legislative Council. He was returned to the assembly in the 1926 elections but refused a ministry in accordance with the policies of the Swarajya Party not to participate in the dyarchy. However, he did not like the secret support that his colleagues in the Swarajya Party gave to the P. Subbarayan government. He felt that the assumption of a stance supportive to a government elected under dyarchy was an endorsement of dyarchy itself. He attended the Bombay session of the All India Congress Committee (AICC), at which he raised the issue. He recommended the creation of a committee to investigate this rebellious deeds of the Madras members of the Swarajya Party. However, the committee tabled a report the very next day announcing that the Madras members were not guilty of any anti-party activities. Muthiah dissented with the committee and left the Swarajya Party.

== In the government ==
In 1928, when two of Subbarayan's ministers R. N. Arogyasamy Mudaliar and A. Ranganatha Mudaliar resigned, Subbarayan invited Muthiah to take over the portfolios of education and excise which Ranganatha Mudaliar had held. This time, Muthiah accepted the invitation and served as the Minister of Education and Excise in the independent ministry from 1928 to 1930. Muthiah Mudaliar is remembered for introducing the Communal G. O. Ms No. 1021 to implement the 1921 order. This act, introduced provisions for reservations for Dalits and increased representation for Indian Christians and Muslims. At the same time, it reduced the reservations for Brahmins from 22% to 16% and non-Brahmins from 48% to 42%. This act was in effect until India's independence on 15 August 1947.

As Minister of Excise, Muthiah launched a Created Excise Propaganda Central Committee along with district committees in order to introduce and implement prohibition in the Presidency. He launched a massive propaganda campaign against consumption of liquor and allocated a record budget of Rs. 4 lakhs (400,000) for propaganda alone. This was probably the most costly propaganda campaign against drinking. Prohibition lasted throughout Subbarayan's tenure but was discontinued by the successor Justice Party regime. As late as August 1934, Rev. Herbert Naderson, Secretary of the Prohibition League, praised Muthiah's efforts at the Imperial Institute at London.

== Death ==
Muthiah Mudaliar died on 15 July 1953, at the age of 70.

== Legacy ==
Muthiah was regarded by his colleagues and followers as simple, practical and overzealous. He lived in the same house until his death. He was commended in the legislative assembly by India's first woman legislator, Muthulakshmi Reddy, for his efforts at women's empowerment such as introduction of a provision for a woman director for the public health department, increasing maternity and child welfare staff and for the provision of a government grant to the Red Cross health school.
