= K. Thirupathy =

Indian politician

- Constituency: Madurai Central constituency

Personal details
- Born: 9 August 1930 Madurai, Tamil Nadu
- Died: 30 September 2015 (aged 85) Madurai
- Party: DMK
- Spouse: Malika

K. Thirupathy ( is an Indian politician.

Thirupathy was born on 9 August 1930, in Madurai in Tamil Nadu. He graduated in Economics from the Madura College and then studied law at Madras Law College and was a practising lawyer before entering politics. He was elected to the Tamil Nadu legislative assembly as a Dravida Munnetra Kazhagam candidate from Madurai Central constituency in 1971. K.Thirupathi died at his home, on 30 September 2015. He was aged 85. Condolence resolution for the demise of Mr K. Thirupathi was recorded in the 14th Assembly of 2016-I Meeting in Tamil Nadu Legislative Assembly.
