= R. S. Ramakrishna Ranga Rao =

Indian politician

Raja Sri Ravu Svetachalapati Sir Ramakrishna Ranga Rao KCIE, Raja of Bobbili

5th First Minister of the Madras Presidency
- In office 24 August 1936 – 1 April 1937
- Governor: Kurma Venkata Reddy Naidu (acting), John Erskine, Lord Erskine (2nd term)
- Preceded by: P. T. Rajan
- Succeeded by: Kurma Venkata Reddy Naidu
- In office 5 November 1932 – 4 April 1936
- Governor: John Erskine, Lord Erskine
- Preceded by: B. Munuswamy Naidu
- Succeeded by: P. T. Rajan

Member of the Legislative Assembly of Andhra Pradesh for Bobbili
- In office 1967–1972
- Premier: Kasu Brahmananda Reddy
- Preceded by: L. Thentu
- Succeeded by: Venkata Krishna Rao

Member of the Constituent Assembly of India
- In office 1946–1951

Member of the Council of State (Imperial Legislative Council of India)
- In office 1927–1927

Raja of Bobbili
- In office 1921 – 1978 (titular from 1948)
- Preceded by: Venkata Kumara Krishna
- Succeeded by: Venkata Gopala Krishna Ranga Rao

Personal details
- Born: 20 February 1901 Bobbili, Madras Presidency, British Raj (Present day Andhra Pradesh)
- Died: 10 March 1978 (aged 77) Bobbili, Andhra Pradesh, India
- Party: Justice Party
- Spouse: Lakshmi Subadrayamma
- Occupation: Politician
- Profession: Lawyer

Raja Sri Ravu Svetachalapati Sir Ramakrishna Ranga Rao KCIE (20 February 1901 – 10 March 1978) was an Indian politician and zamindar who served as the First Minister of Madras Presidency from 5 November 1932 to 4 April 1936 and 24 August 1936 to 1 April 1937.

Ramakrishna Ranga Rao was born in the royal family of Bobbili zamindari in 1901. He succeeded his father Venkata Kumar Krishna to the throne of Bobbili and ruled as zamindar from 1921 to 1948 and as the titular "Raja of Bobbili" from 1948 to 1978. He set up trusts and patronized sports and education.

Ramakrishna Ranga Rao joined the Justice Party in 1930 and was elected to the Madras Legislative Assembly. He served as the First Minister of Madras Presidency from 1932 to 1936 and 1937. He resigned as First Minister in 1937 when the Justice Party lost the elections. From 1946 to 1951, he served as a member of the Constituent Assembly of India which framed India's Constitution. In his later years, he also served a term as a member of the Andhra Pradesh Legislative Assembly for the Bobbili assembly constituency.

Ramakrishna Ranga Rao married Lakshmi Subhadrayamma in 1921. He had a son Venkata Gopala Krishna Rao who succeeded him as Raja in 1978. Ramakrishna Ranga Rao is mostly remembered for his contribution towards framing India's constitution and for his service to society in establishing colleges. He is also held responsible by analysts for the defeat of the Justice Party in the 1937 assembly elections which is blamed upon his despotism and anti-people measures.

== Early life ==
Ramakrishna Ranga Rao was born in Bobbili in Madras Presidency (now a part of the Indian state of Andhra Pradesh) in the Bobbili royal family. He was the son of the heir-apparent, Venkata Kumar Krishna Ranga Rao of the Bobbili zamindari. He had an elder sister Victoria Venkata Ramanamma, born on 10 October 1899.

In his childhood, he was tutored by H.C. Leclare, D. Gordon, F.H.J. Wilkinson and Ramalingaswamy. He used to play badminton and billiards in the palace.

Ramakrishna married Lakshmi Subhadrayamma, a princess of the Tallaprole Zamindari in 1921. He succeeded to the throne as the 13th Raja of Bobbili.

== Early political career ==
Ramakrishna Ranga Rao made his entry into politics when he was nominated a member of the Council of State, the upper house of the Imperial Legislative Assembly of India in 1925. He served as a member of the assembly till 1927.

Ramakrishna Ranga Rao contested the Madras general elections of 1930 from the Vizagapatam constituency as a Justice Party (India) candidate against the Nationalist Party nominee, C.V.S. Narasimha Raju, and polled 28,000 more votes than his opponent.

He also attended the second Round Table Conference held in London in 1931 as a representative of the Indian landholders.

== Rise to leadership ==
Bobbili rapidly rose in power and position during the tenure of B. Munuswamy Naidu. As Naidu began to alienate the zamindars by omitting eminent and powerful people like Rajah Muthiah Chettiar from his cabinet, these disgruntled zamindars favoured the Raja of Bobbili as an acceptable alternative. Gradually, the leadership of the party passed on from Naidu to Bobbili. When both his ministers in the cabinet resigned, Naidu was forced to step down as First minister. Subsequently, the Raja of Bobbili took oath as First Minister on 5 November 1932.

During this period, the Raja's personal secretary was C. N. Annadurai who later served as the Chief Minister of Tamil Nadu from 1967 to 1969.

== Tenure as First Minister ==
Ramakrishna Ranga Rao's Cabinet
Portfolio	Minister
Local Self-Government	Raja of Bobbili (Also First Minister)
Development, Public Works and Registration	P. T. Rajan
Education, excise	S. Kumaraswami Reddiar (1934–1936)
Education, excise	Rajah Muthiah Chettiar
Home	Mohammad Usman (1932–1934)
Home	A. T. Panneerselvam
Source: Encyclopaedia of Political Parties

The Raja of Bobbili became the First Minister on 5 November 1932 at the age of 31 and except for a short span of 4 months when he was on a trip to England, served as First Minister until 1 April 1937. During his tenure, Madras was in the grips of the Great Depression. The Raja did introduce some measures in order to relieve the burden on the poor peasant. But by and large, the rapid depreciation of the economy remained unchecked and the government showed little concern towards the plight of the poor peasant. The Justice Party lost badly in the 1937 elections. The Raja's policies are believed to be the main reason.

=== Revival of the mayoralty ===
The Mayoralty of Madras came into existence when the Corporation of Madras was established in 1688. The first mayor was Nathaniel Higginson, who resigned after a period of six months to take over as Governor of Madras. The post of mayor was abolished in 1801.

The post of mayor was revived by the Raja of Bobbili government on 17 January 1933, by the City Municipal Act. The first mayor after its revival was the prominent Justice Party Leader, K. Sriramulu Naidu who was followed by Raja Sir Annamalai Chettiar.

=== Estates Land Act of 1933 ===
In August 1933, despite the vehement opposition of zamindars in the Madras Presidency, the Raja of Bobbili passed an amendment to the Estates Land Act of 1908 which safeguarded the rights of the cultivators and freed them from the bondage of middlemen or inamdars. However, despite this legislation and a few others benefitting the cultivator, his regime was regarded as one which largely supported the interests of zamindars.

=== 1934 Assembly elections ===
The term of the legislature expired on 5 November 1933. However, the elections to the Madras Legislative Council were delayed by a year. Meanwhile, the Indian National Congress had decided to participate in the elections at a meeting in Patna in May 1934 and hence, when the elections took place in November 1934, the Justice Party lost miserably. However, the Raja of Bobbili adopted contingency measures by immediately convening a meeting and conducting negotiations between the different factions of the party. The Swarajya Party which won a majority in the Assembly once again refused to form the government in accordance with its policy of wrecking the dyarchy. So, the Raja of Bobbili was elected First Minister for a second term though he did not command the majority of the house.

Justice Party stalwarts R. K. Shanmukham Chetty and Arcot Ramasamy Mudaliar had lost their seats as the chief whip of the party, Rajah Muthiah Chettiar withdrew his support for their candidature. Ramakrishna Ranga Rao responded by dismissing Rajah Muthiah Chettiar as the leader of the party in the Assembly. Muthiah moved a no-confidence motion against the ministry but the motion was defeated. However, the differences between the Raja of Bobbili and Muthiah Chettiar was soon patched up and the Raja made the latter a minister in the cabinet.

=== Changes in the ministry ===
S. Kumaraswami Reddiar resigned his ministry post due to ill-health in 1936 and he was replaced with Rajah Muthiah Chettiar in a move to wipe out differences in the party. With the permission of the Governor, the Raja also created a new Ministry of Home in order to accommodate disgruntled factions in the party. Mohammad Usman served as the first Minister of Home followed by Sir A. T. Pannirselvam.

=== Separation of Ganjam district ===
On 1 April 1936, the Ganjam district was separated from Madras Presidency and constituted in the newly created province of Orissa.

=== Policy during the Great Depression ===
The Great Depression struck the province at the fag end of P. Subbarayan's tenure and lasted the whole span of the Munuswamy Naidu and Bobbili governments. The policy of the Raja of Bobbili during the Depression was alleged to be one of the indifference to plight of the peasants and the poor. The government expressed its complete solidarity with the Governor and his executive council. As a result, while the Government endorsed the measures taken by the governor it did not criticize those that were detrimental to the common man. The ministry is alleged to have done little for the financial relief of the common man apart from making recommendations or expressing sympathy and grief. Moreover, the affluent lifestyle led by the ministers at the height of the Great Depression were sharply criticized. Madras ministers drew a salary of Rs.433 per month as opposed to Rs.225 per month that ministers in the Central Provinces received as salary. This invoked the ire of the Madras press. The newspaper India wrote:

Is not Rs.225 enough for Madras ministers, who were only second-rate vakils in the mufassal (rural areas)? When the poor are suffering for want of money, they are drawing fat salaries? What an injustice?

In 1933, the Indian National Congress, represented by the Swarajya Party, brought forth a resolution demanding a decrease of 12.5% in land revenue in non-Zamindari areas. The Justice Party voted against the resolution. Angered by the stand of the Justice Party, the Congress declared that 26 November 1933 be observed as Land Revenue Reduction Day. Protests were organized all over the province. At a meeting organized on the Madras beach, Congress leader Sathyamurthy demanded that the land tax be reduced by 33.3 percent. These demands were backed by the peasants in the province. However, these demands went unheeded. On the eve of the 1937 elections, the South Indian Federation of Peasants passed a resolution

This federation resolves that in the coming Assembly elections the proper and class-wise course for peasants to follow is to vote for the Congress candidates in general and to utilize all their organizational and other resources to strengthen those Congress candidates who give their unequivocal assurance of support for implementing of the peasant's charter of minimum demands through their work both within and without the Legislatures.

Individual Congressmen launched agitations for the abolition of zamindaris. The Raja of Bobbili was against the movement as being a zamindar himself, he had pro-zamindar sympathies. He, therefore, considered it to be a law and order issue and order a crackdown leading to police firing in some areas.

Lord Erskine, the Governor of Madras wrote to the Secretary of State for India, Lord Zetland in February 1937 that the peasants in South India were fed up with the Justice Party.

=== Alleged abuse of authority ===
Bobbili's rule was autocratic and he was highly inaccessible to party members. The success of every previous government in the Presidency had been due to the support of the district boards. However, the Raja of Bobbili, instead of appeasing the district-level politicians tried to destroy their power and influence.

The Suthanthira Sangu, in its issue dated 26 February 1935:

The Local Boards Act has been recently amended, taluk boards have been abolished, a district board has been bifurcated and attempts have been made to bifurcate other boards, which are hostile to him... He is superseding municipalities, which do not bow to his authority, removing chairmen not liked by him and trying to forfeit the liberty of these bodies by the appointment of Commissioners.

The Madras Mail noted in its editorial dated 1 June 1935:

if the Justice Party is really determined upon reorganisation, it should be one of its first proclamations that, so far as it is concerned the spoils system must go

This, along with Bobbili's autocratic rule and factionalism within the party, had disastrous effects for the fortunes of the Justice party.

== 1937 elections ==
The Justice Party contested the 1937 provincial assembly elections, the first according to the Government of India Act 1935, under the Raja's leadership and lost badly, winning just 18 out of 215 assembly seats and 7 out of 46 council seats. The Raja, himself, lost his seat to Indian National Congress candidate V. V. Giri (a future President of India) by over 6,000 votes, almost triggering the end of his political career. Other prominent losers in the election were P. T. Rajan, Kumarraja of Venkatagiri and A. P. Patro. The Justice Party ceased to be a major force and remained so until it was revived by E. V. Ramasami during the 1938 Madras Anti-Hindi agitations. The Raja led a much-weakened Justice Party until 1938, when he bowed out of politics.

Meanwhile, the Justice Party's opponents the Indian National Congress had decided to contest the elections at a rally in 1935. It was at this rally that the Swarajya Party formally merged with the Indian National Congress when Congress resolved to participate in the elections. The united Indian National Congress led by Chakravarti Rajagopalachari captured power in the province and ruled until the declaration of war in 1939.

P. Rajaraman sums up the factors as follows "internal dissension, ineffective organization, inertia and lack of proper leadership led to the Justice Party along the path of decline".

== Retirement from politics ==
Following the defeat of the Justice Party in the 1937 elections, the Raja's participation in politics drastically decreased until the anti-Hindi agitations, when E. V. Ramasami was elected President of the Justice Party. The Raja temporarily bowed out of politics and devoted himself to social service and other public activities.

In 1946, the Raja was elected to the Constituent Assembly of India and was part of the team which wrote India's Constitution. In 1948, following India's independence from British rule, Ramakrishna Ranga Rao lost his administrative rights over Bobbili and was reduced to the status of a titular "Raja" with some exclusive privileges.

== Other activities ==
The Raja was a great sportsman and his main interests were horse racing and polo. He had imported many fine breeds of horses from the United Kingdom, France and Pakistan. He had won a number of cups in horse racing. He was an expert polo player and often played in the Dasara sports at Mysore and Jeypore besides Bobbili.

He also contributed to Andhra University and Shantiniketan. The Raja served as the Chancellor of Andhra University in 1930. The Rajah R.S.R.K. Ranga Rao College was inaugurated at Bobbili on the occasion of his sixtieth birthday in 1961.

== Later years and death ==
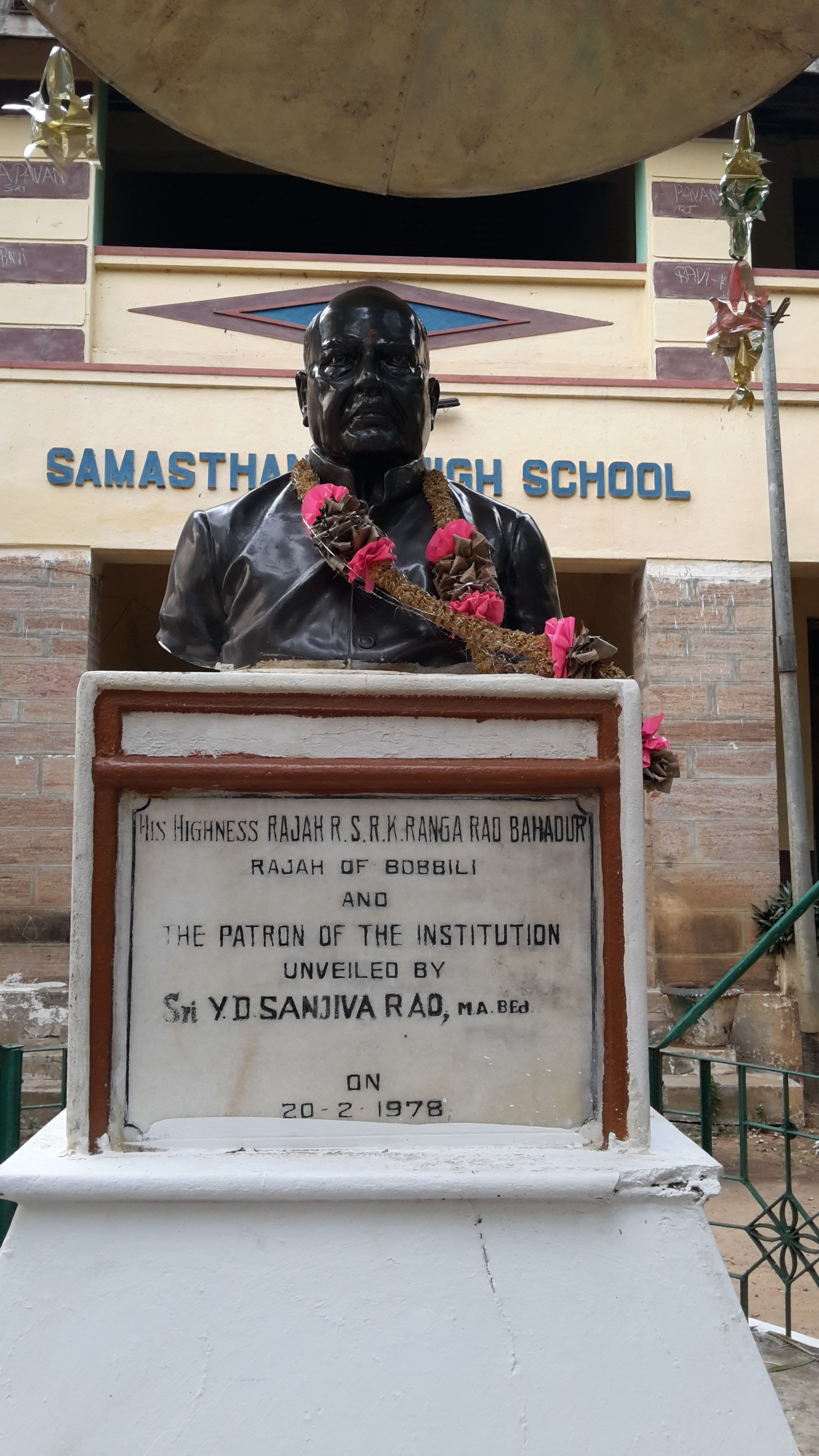
Statue of Ramakrishna Ranga Rao (Rajah of Bobbili)

The Raja briefly returned to politics in his later years and contested as an independent from Bobbili assembly constituency in the 1967 elections to the Andhra Pradesh Legislative Assembly at the age of 66. He was subsequently elected by a margin of 28,561 votes over his nearest rival, L. Thentu of the Indian National Congress. The Raja served as a member of the Andhra Pradesh Legislative Assembly from 1967 to 1972. He did not stand for re-election when his term came to an end in 1972.

Ramakrishna Ranga Rao died on 10 March 1978 at the age of 77. Ramakrishna Ranga Rao was succeeded as the titular Raja of Bobbili by his son Venkata Gopala Krishna Ranga Rao.

== Successors ==
The incumbent Raja of Bobbili is R. V. Gopala Krishna Ranga Rao, son of Ramakrishna Ranga Rao. He was elected to the 3rd Lok Sabha from Bobbili (Lok Sabha constituency) in 1962. Ramakrishna Ranga Rao's grandson R. V. Sujay Krishna Ranga Rao is the heir-apparent to the title. Sujay Krishna Ranga Rao also stood in the 2004 Andhra Pradesh Assembly elections as a candidate of the Indian National Congress and was elected to the Andhra Pradesh Assembly from Bobbili 3 times. Sujay Krishna Ranga Rao's brothers are Rama Krishna Ranga Rao and RVSKK Rangarao (Baby Nayana).

== Notes ==
Preceded by Venkata Kumar Krishna	Raja of Bobbili; 1921 – 1978 (from 1948, titular ruler)	Succeeded by Venkata Gopala krishna Ranga Rao
Preceded by B. Munuswamy Naidu	President of the South Indian Liberal Federation; 1932 – 1938	Succeeded by E. V. Ramasami
Preceded by B. Munuswamy Naidu	First Minister of Madras Presidency; 4 November 1932 – 4 April 1936	Succeeded by P. T. Rajan
Preceded by P. T. Rajan	First Minister of Madras Presidency; 24 August 1936 – 1 April 1937	Succeeded by Kurma Venkata Reddy Naidu
Preceded by L. Thentu	Member of the Andhra Pradesh Legislative Assembly for Bobbili; 1967 – 1972	Succeeded by Venkata Krishna Rao
