= P. T. R. Palanivel Rajan =

Indian politician (1932-2006)

Dr P.T.R. Palanivel Rajan
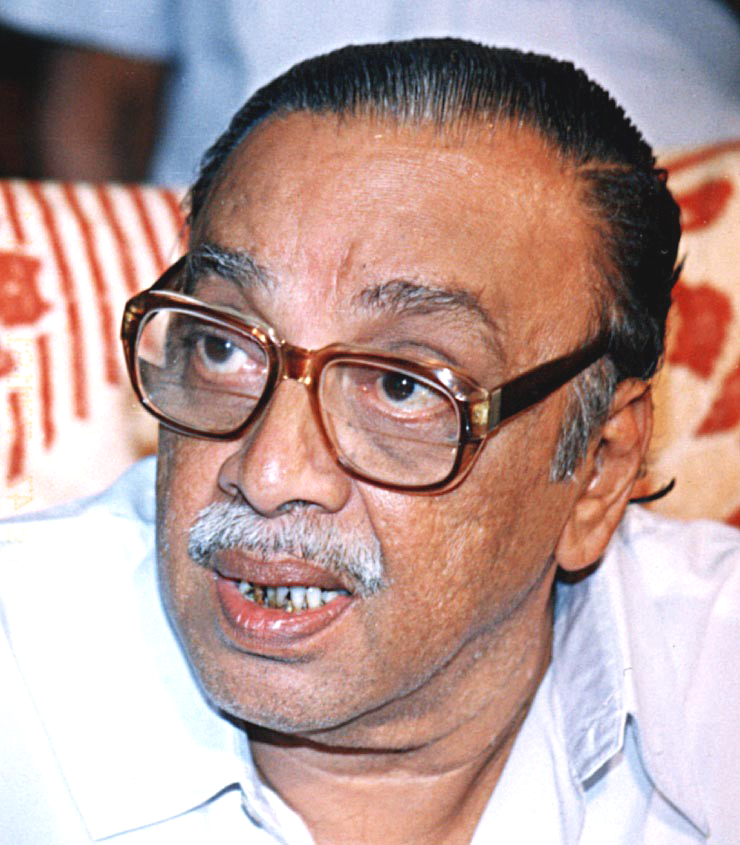

9th Speaker of the Tamil Nadu Legislative Assembly
- In office 23 May 1996 – 21 May 2001
- Preceded by: R. Muthiah
- Succeeded by: K. Kalimuthu
- Constituency: Madurai West

Tamil Nadu Minister for Hindu Religious and Charitable Endowments
- In office 13 May 2006 – 20 May 2006
- Constituency: Madurai Central

Personal details
- Born: 27 February 1932 Theni, Madras Presidency, British India
- Died: 20 May 2006 (aged 74) Madurai, Tamil Nadu, India
- Party: Dravida Munnetra Kazhagam
- Spouse: Rukmini
- Children: Palanivel Thiagarajan
- Parent: P. T. Rajan (father)

Ponnambala Thyaga Rajan Palanivel Rajan (27 February 1932 – 20 May 2006) was an Indian politician.

Born into an aristocratic landlord Kondaikatti Thondaimandala Vellalar family in Uthamapalayam. He did his schooling from Trinity College, Kandy, Sri Lanka. He graduated in political science from Madras Christian College and then studied law at Madras Law College. He was a practising lawyer before entering politics in 1967 when he joined the Dravida Munnetra Kazhagam (DMK).

Rajan was first elected to the Tamil Nadu Legislative Assembly from Theni in 1967 and was re-elected in 1971. He was elected in 1996 from the Madurai West Constituency. In 2001 he was defeated by 708 votes after M. K. Alagiri worked against him and other DMK candidates. He was earlier elected to the Tamil Nadu Legislative Council.

Rajan was Speaker of the Tamil Nadu Legislative Assembly from 1996 to 2001. He was elected from Madurai Central and was the Minister for Hindu Religious and Charitable Endowments in the Government of Tamil Nadu at the time of his death on 20 May 2006 at the age of 74. Madurai Kamaraj University conferred the Doctor of Law on him (Honoris Causa) in 1997.

His father P. T. Rajan was Chief Minister of Madras Presidency. His son, Palanivel Thiaga Rajan was an MLA and was the finance minister of Tamil Nadu and Minister of Information Technology and Digital Services in the M. K. Stalin ministry.
