= Panaganti Ramarayaningar =

Indian politician (1866–1928)

Sir Panaganti Ramarayaningar KCIE
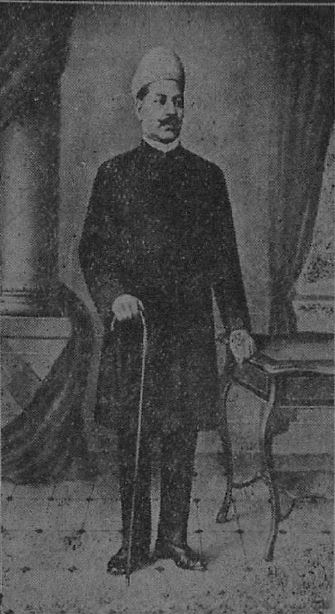
- Portrait of Raja of Panagal

2nd First Minister of the Madras Presidency
- In office 11 July 1921 – 3 December 1926
- Governor: Freeman Freeman-Thomas, 1st Marquess of Willingdon, Sir Charles George Todhunter (acting), George Goschen, 2nd Viscount Goschen
- Preceded by: A. Subbarayalu Reddiar
- Succeeded by: P. Subbarayan
- In office 17 December 1920 – 3 December 1926
- Premier: A. Subbarayalu Reddiar, Raja of Panagal
- Governor: Freeman Freeman-Thomas, 1st Marquess of Willingdon Sir Charles George Todhunter (acting), George Goschen, 2nd Viscount Goschen
- Preceded by: None
- Succeeded by: P. Subbarayan

Member of the Imperial Legislative Council of India
- In office 1912–1915
- Monarch: George V of the United Kingdom
- Governor-General: Charles Hardinge, 1st Baron Hardinge of Penshurst

Personal details
- Born: 9 July 1866 Srikalahasti, (North Arcot District, Madras Presidency) (now Chittoor District, Andhra Pradesh)
- Died: 16 December 1928 (aged 62) Madras, (Now Chennai, Tamil Nadu)
- Party: Justice Party
- Parent: C.V. Sundara Sastri (father)
- Education: Presidency College, Madras
- Occupation: Legislator, First Minister
- Profession: Statesman, lawyer

Raja Sir Panaganti Ramarayaningar KCIE (9 July 1866 – 16 December 1928), also known as the Raja of Panagal, was a zamindar of Kalahasti, a Justice Party leader and the First Minister of Madras Presidency from 11 July 1921 to 3 December 1926.

Ramarayaningar was born in Srikalahasti, Chittoor district on 9 July 1866, and fostered in the Vadama Calamur family, whose pro-Brahmin, Mylapore clique influence and political moderation he would come to fiercely oppose. He was educated in Madras and obtained degrees in Sanskrit, law, philosophy and Dravidian languages before entering politics. He was one of the founder-members of the Justice Party and served as its president from 1925 to 1928.

From 17 December 1920 to 11 July 1921, Ramarayaningar served as the Minister of Local Self-Government in the first Justice Party government led by A. Subbarayalu Reddiar. He served as the First Minister of Madras Presidency from 11 July 1921 to 3 December 1926. He introduced a number of reforms during his tenure. The Thyagaraya Nagar locality in Chennai was developed during his First-Ministership. Ramarayaningar resigned as First Minister in 1926 when the Justice Party failed to obtain a majority in the 1926 elections to the Madras Legislative Council. He, however, continued to remain active in politics and served as the President of the Justice Party until his death on 16 December 1928. Serving a total of over 5 years, he remains the longest-serving First Minister in the Presidency era. Further, taking into account Madras Presidency's successor states of Madras and Tamil Nadu, he held the record as the longest-serving First Minister until 6 September 1959 (for almost 33 years), when Congress's K. Kamaraj overtook his 1,972-day record. With MGR, M. Karunanidhi and J. Jayalalithaa overtaking Kamaraj's record, he is the 5th longest-serving First Minister of the state (throughout its various incarnations).

Ramarayaningar was regarded as an advocate of democracy and a staunch supporter of empowerment of the depressed classes. Historians generally attribute the decline of the Justice Party in the mid-1930s to the absence of charismatic leaders in the Justice Party following his death.

== Early life ==
Ramarayaningar belonged to Telugu Padmanayaka Velama community. His early education and rearing was in the Calamur family, in the household of his foster-father Calamur Sundara Sastri, the son of C. V. Runganada Sastri, and father-in-law of C. P. Ramaswami Iyer. He completed his schooling from Triplicane High School in 1886 and graduated in Sanskrit from the Presidency College in 1893 with Advanced Chemistry as his optional subject. He graduated in BL and M.A. (Philosophy and Dravidian Languages) in 1899. In 1919, he was appointed a fellow of the Presidency College.

== Early political career ==
Ramarayaningar got his first taste of politics when he was appointed to the district board of North Arcot. In 1912, he was nominated to the Imperial Legislative Council of India and represented the landlords and zamindars of South India. He served as a legislator until 1915. During this period, Ramarayaningar earned the praise of the Viceroy, Lord Hardinge. He actively supported reforms in the Hindu society. In 1914, Ramarayaningar moved a legislation for the creation of separate Provincial departments for the welfare of depressed classes. In 1915, he was elected President of the Third Andhra Congress.

In 1914, the Madras Dravidian Association was established by C. Natesa Mudaliar. Ramarayaningar was elected as the first President of the Association. On 19 July 1917, at a conference in Coimbatore presided over by the Ramarayaningar, the four different non-Brahmin associations got together to form the South Indian Liberal Federation, unofficially known as the Justice Party. In 1921, Ramarayaningar was sent along with Kurma Venkata Reddy Naidu and Koka Appa Rao Naidu to lobby on behalf of the Justice Party before the authorities in England.

Ramarayaningar was also active in the All-India Non-Brahmin movement. He was a friend of Shahu Maharaj and was closely associated with the former's Satya Shodhak Samaj. He attended the All India Non-Brahmin Conference held at Belgaum on 26 December 1924 and presided over the Second All-India Non-Brahmin Conference held at Victoria Hall, Madras on 25 May 1925.

When the Government of India Act was passed in 1919, provisions were made to hold elections in the Madras Presidency for the first time in history. The Justice Party unanimously decided to contest the elections and was elected to power in the province. A. Subbarayalu Reddiar became the inaugural First Minister of the Madras Presidency. Ramarayaningar served as Minister of Local Self-Government in the Subbarayalu Reddiar Government. When Subbarayalu Reddiar resigned, citing health reasons, Ramarayaningar was appointed First Minister.

== First Minister of Madras ==
Ramarayaningar served as the First Minister of Madras from 11 July 1921 till 3 December 1926. A. P. Patro of Berhampur was appointed to fill the vacancy caused by Subbarayalu Reddiar's resignation, and he took the portfolio of education.

Ramarayaningar's Cabinet
Portfolio	Minister
Local Self-Government	Panaganti Ramarayaningar (later Raja of Panagal) (First Minister) (1921–1926)
Education, Excise and Public works	Sir A. P. Patro (1921–1926)
Development	Kurma Venkata Reddy Naidu (1921–1923)
Development	Sir T. N. Sivagnanam Pillai (1923–1926)
Source: Encyclopaedia of Political Parties

=== B & C Mills strike of 1921 ===
In 1921, a labour strike erupted in the Buckingham and Carnatic Mills in Madras. This strike was led by V. Kalyanasundara Mudaliar, a leader of the Indian National Congress. The strike lasted for over six months during which around 10,000 workers struck work. A crackdown was ordered. Eventually, two factions emerged; one group of workers desired to return to work while another wished to continue the strike. Violent riots broke out when striking workers prevented the others from returning to work. The riots began to assume communal colours as the workers who wished to continue the strike were mostly caste Hindus while those who desired to end it were largely Scheduled Castes.

Ministers in the Madras government and ruling party members supported the strike. On 29 August 1921, the police opened fire and killed six of the workers on the spot. Top Justice Party leaders like O. Thanikachalam Chetti severely censured the police for the measures they adopted. The main reason was that the police was under the control of the governor and the government was looking for an opportunity to harass the executive. Another probable reason was that the striking workers had the caste sympathies of the Justice Party government whose ministers and chief whips were caste Hindus like themselves.

The Justice Party leaders were extremely vociferous in their attacks on Paraiyars and the Labour Department. Their views were endorsed by the Raja of Panagal who joined Thanickachalam Chetti in admonishing the Paraiyars. The party's organ Justice blamed the riots on the "pampering" of Paraiyars by the Labour Department. M. C. Rajah, the leader of the Scheduled Castes in the Justice Party, in turn, retorted by describing the criticism of Scheduled Castes by Justice Party members as "the high-handed poisonous action of members of a party who after inflicting all known and unknown injury on our community shed crocodile tears and pose as friends of the Depressed classes". Though the B & C mills strike was eventually settled through the mediation of C. Natesa Mudaliar, the communal riots which had accompanied it estranged Scheduled Castes from the Justice Party. and was one of the reasons for Rajah quitting the party at a later stage.

=== Second general elections ===
Polling for the second general elections in the Madras Presidency began on 11 September 1923. However, owing to heavy rains, polling was not completed until 10 November. Though the Justice Party returned to power, its majority had been considerably reduced. Observers attribute this decline in performance to the rift between the Tamil and Telugu members of the Justice party. Ramarayaningar assumed office as First Minister on 19 November 1923 and retained the same Cabinet with one change – K. V. Reddi Naidu, the Minister of Development was replaced with T. N. Sivagnanam Pillai. In 1923, the British government bestowed upon Ramarayaningar, the honorific title of "Raja of Panagal".

=== No-confidence motion ===
In 1923, a few prominent members of the Justice Party broke off to form the United Nationalist Party and projected themselves as "Democrats". The dissidents were led by C. R. Reddy, a leader of the Justice Party, who complained of the dictatorial rule of the Raja and his insensitive, unimaginative policies. On 27 November 1923, a no-confidence motion was introduced against the government of the Raja of Panagal. The no-confidence motion was defeated by a margin of 65 votes to 44.

=== Reforms ===
Ramarayaningar introduced a number of reforms during his tenure as First Minister.

Hindu Religious Endowments Bill

In 1921, the Raja of Panagal introduced the Hindu Religious Endowments Bill. As per this bill, trusts were established to maintain temple funds and given complete power over the administration of temples. This act evoked severe protests from some sections of the assembly which felt that this was an intrusion in the religious affairs of the populace. However, the Shankaracharya of Kanchi gave his support to the bill even while expressing his concern over some of its provisions.

Madras State Aid to Industries Act

In 1922, the Madras State Aid to Industries Act was passed. Through this act, the government made it a state policy to advance loans to developing industries. It received less opposition in the assembly. This eventually became Madras Act V of 1923.

Educational reforms

The Madras University Act was passed in the year 1923. The bill was introduced by Education Minister Sir A. P. Patro. As per the provisions of this bill, the governing body of the Madras University was completely reorganised on democratic lines. The bill asserted that the governing body would henceforth be headed by a Chancellor who would be assisted by a pro-Chancellor who was usually the Minister of Education. Apart from the Chancellor and the pro-Chancellor who were elected, there was to be a Vice-Chancellor appointed by the Chancellor. In 1925, the Andhra University Act was passed which included similar reforms in Andhra University.

However, the tenure of the Justice Party government of the Raja of Panagal is largely remembered for the introduction of caste-based reservations in 1921. In August 1921, the First communal Government Order (G.O. No.613) was passed. As per the order, 44 percent of jobs were reserved for non-Brahmins, 16 percent for Brahmins, 16 percent for Muslims, 16 percent for Anglo-Indians and Christians and eight percent for the Scheduled Castes.

In 1923, M. C. Rajah, a Justice Party leader from the Scheduled Caste community protested against the government order arguing that the act did not guarantee adequate representation of scheduled castes who he felt deserved 30% reservation in the administration and the services. When the Justice Party failed to respond, he resigned from the primary membership of the party.

Dr. Gour's Bill

Dr. Gour's Bill, introduced in 1921, brought about an amendment in the Special Marriages Act, sanctioning the legal validity of inter-caste marriages.

Municipal development

Map of Madras city in 1921, before the draining of Long Tank

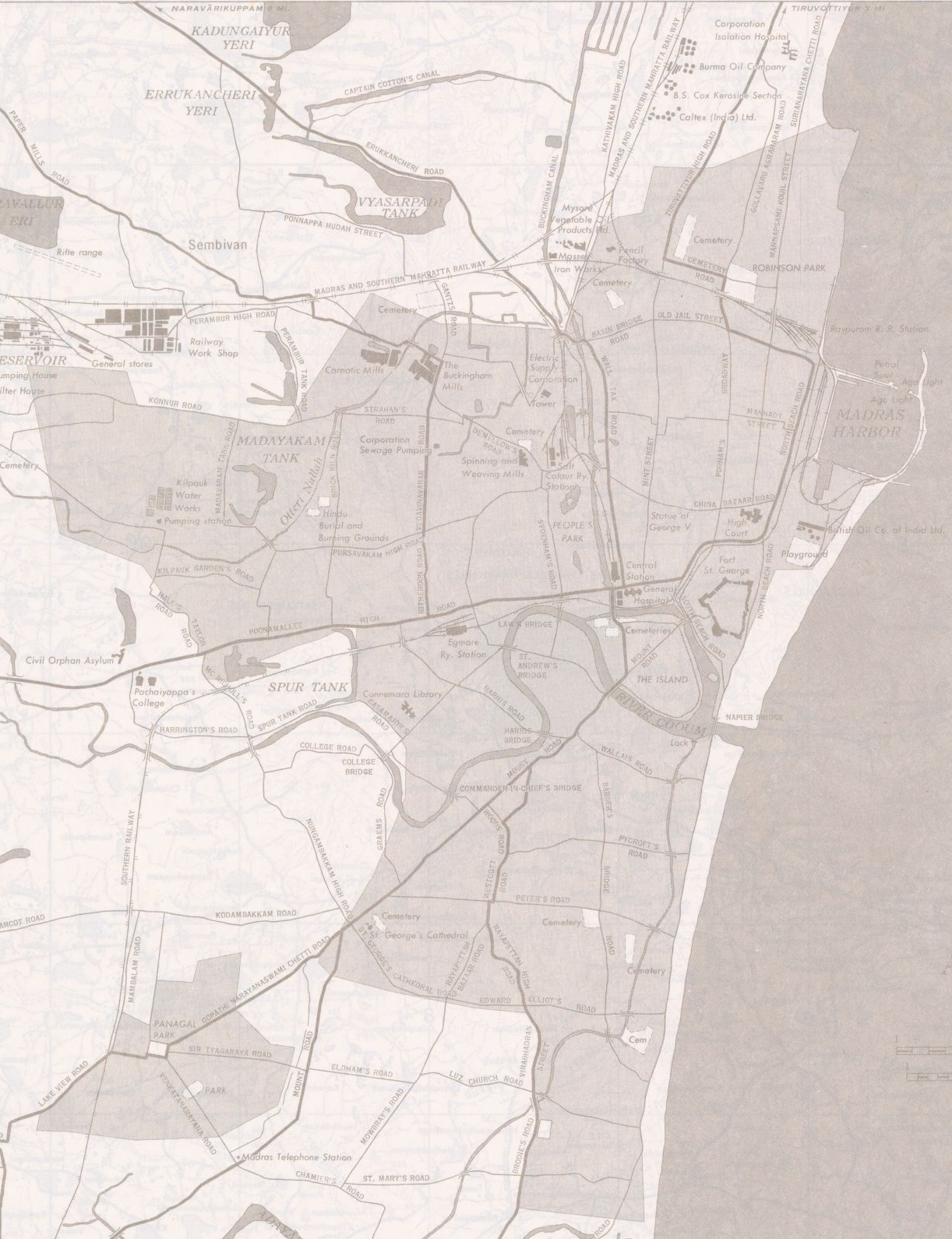
Madras city in 1955, after Long Tank had been drained out

The rapid growth of the population of Madras necessitated the expansion of the city and the creation of more residential colonies. To fulfill this requirement, the Madras Town Planning Act of 1920 had been passed on 7 September 1920 before the dyarchy was established. As per the provisions of this Act, numerous town planning measures were taken during the tenure of the Raja of Panagal. The 5 km (3.1 mi) long and 2 km (1.2 mi) broad Long Tank, which extended from Nungambakkam to Saidapet, forming an arc along the city's western frontier, was drained out in 1923. The development of the tract to the west of the Long Tank had been initiated by the British Government in 1911 with the construction of a railway station at the village of Marmalan or Mambalam. Following the draining out of the Long Tank, the Justice Party government of the Raja of Panagal conceived the creation of a residential colony adjoining this little village.

The residential colony was named Theagaroya Nagar after Justice Party stalwart Sir Pitti Theagaroya Chetty, who had died shortly before the township was inaugurated, and was centred around a park named Panagal Park after the Raja of Panagal. The streets in this new locality were named after prominent members of the Justice Party or officials in the municipal administration.

Other reforms

The Raja of Panagal reorganised the Public Works Department in the Presidency, improved medical facilities, water supply and communications in rural areas and patronised Siddha medicine. Sir Muhammed Usman, later minister in the government of the Raja of Bobbili was appointed secretary of the committee on siddha medicine. He also sponsored endowments to the University of Madras to produce scientific literature in Telugu.

== President of the Justice Party ==
Theagaroya Chetty, the founder-President of the Justice Party died in 1925 and the Raja, then First Minister of Madras succeeded Chetty as the second President of the Justice Party. The Raja served as the President of the party until his death in 1928.

Performance of the Justice Party during the tenure of the Raja of Panagal
Assembly elections	Seats in Madras Assembly	Assembly Seats won by the Justice Party	Total number of Council seats	Number of Justice Party members nominated to the council	Result	Party President	Office held by Ramarayaningar
1920	98	63	29	18	Won	Sir P. Theagaroya Chetty	Took office as Minister of Local Self-Government
1923	98	44	29	17	Won	Sir P. Theagaroya Chetty	Re-elected as First Minister of Madras Presidency
1926	98	21	34	0	Lost	Raja of Panagal	Resigned as First Minister of Madras Presidency
Source: Encyclopaedia of Political Parties

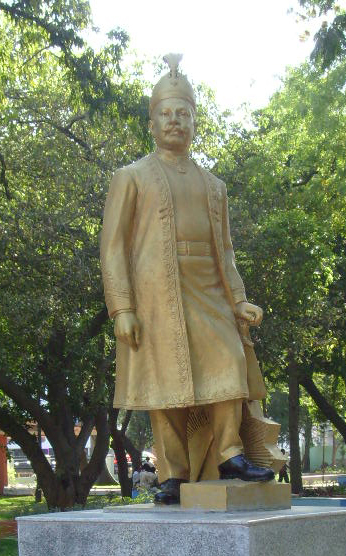
Statue of the Raja of Panagal inside Panagal Park, Chennai

== Later years ==
Ramarayaningar was made a Knight Commander of the Order of the Indian Empire on 5 June 1926. In the Assembly elections which took place on 8 November 1926, no party was able to get a clean majority. The Swarajya Party won 41 of the 98 seats and emerged as the single largest party while the Justice party won 21. The Raja resigned as the First Minister of the Presidency as the popular verdict appeared to be against the Justice Party. As no party had a clean majority and the Swarajya Party which was the single largest party in the assembly was reluctant to form the government, the Governor appointed P. Subbarayan as the independent First Minister and nominated 34 members to the council to support him.

In 1927, the Simon Commission which was appointed to report on the working of the progress of the Montagu-Chelmsford reforms landed in India. The Swarajya Party moved a resolution to boycott the commission and this was passed 61 to 50 with 12 remaining neutral. The Justice Party and the Swarajists supported the resolution while the First Minister P. Subbarayan opposed it and requested his ministers to resign. However, Lord Goschen, the Governor, was able to obtain the support of the Raja of Panagal by making a Justice Party member, M. Krishnan Nair, a Cabinet minister. Led by the Raja of Panagal, the Justice Party switched sides and lent its support to the Subbarayan government. Soon afterwards, the Justice Party passed a resolution welcoming the Simon Commission. The Simon Commission visited Madras on 28 February 1928 and 18 February 1929 and was boycotted by the Swarajya Party and the Indian National Congress. However, the Justicites and the Subbarayan Government accorded the commission a warm reception.

== Death and legacy ==
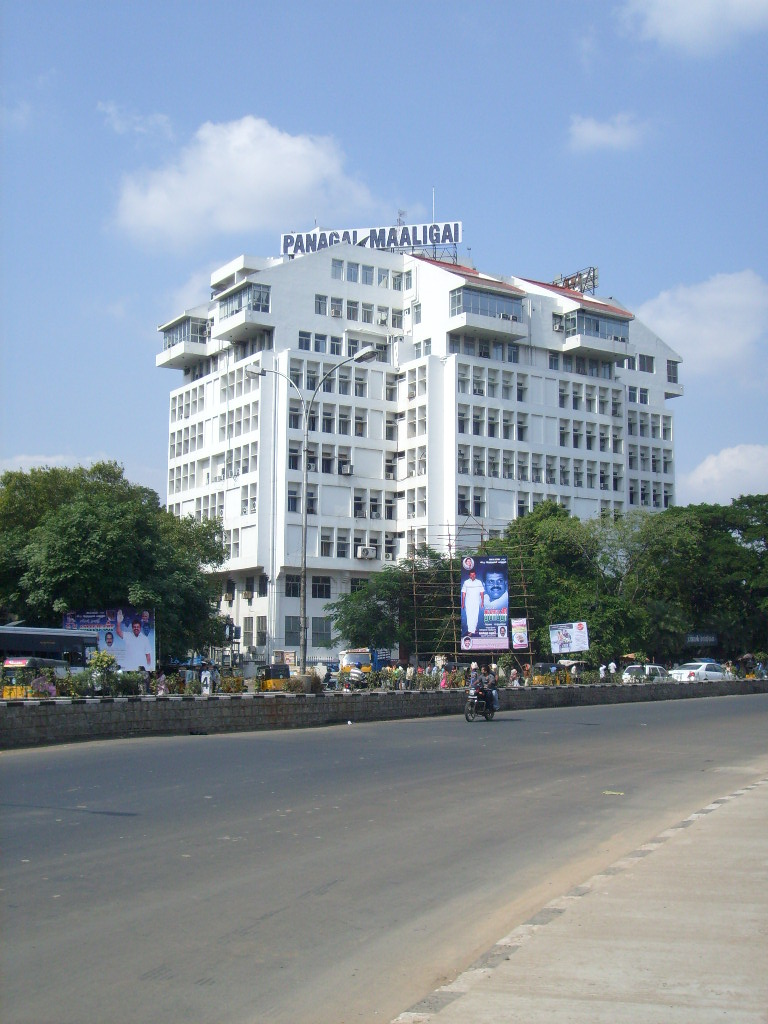
Panagal Maaligai or Panagal Building, formerly Chingleput Collectorate, and currently, District Revenue Office, is named after the Raja of Panagal

Ramarayaningar died on 16 December 1928 of influenza.

He was succeeded as the President of the Justice Party by B. Munuswamy Naidu. On his death, leading newspapers and magazines poured accolades on him. S. Srinivasa Iyengar, a political opponent of the Raja, said of him:

The Rajah Sahib had singular gifts to leadership, tact and of high diplomacy. He had not only led his party with remarkable success but he fought the bureaucracy with even greater skill and courage

The Hindu paid rich tributes to the Raja:

Essentially a conservative by instinct and training, he showed remarkable ability to perceive the trend of the popular upheaval in our province no less in social than in political matters and he showed consummate strategy and great ability in maintaining the influence and integrity of his party, when the mantle of leadership fell on him after the death of Sir P. Theagaraya Chetti a few years ago. In many respects he was a contrast to the other leader who was frank, outspoken and vehement in his lift and conduct. The Rajah Saheb was, on the other hand, reserved and restrained, tactful and polished to a degree and his courtesy and consideration to friends and opponents alike has always been marked

The Justice Party began to decline with the death of the Raja of Panagal. The lack of efficient leadership in the party is regarded as the main reason for its decline.

== Ideology ==
Despite his aristocratic birth, Ramarayaningar was known for his egalitarian views. Despite the fact that he was regarded as a communalist and anti-Brahmin, he nominated a Brahmin, T. Sadasiva Iyer as the Commissioner of the Hindu Religious Endowment Board.

Ramarayaningar, however, strongly opposed what he perceived as the monopolisation of education by Brahmins. On being interviewed by Katherine Mayo, he responded:

What did the Brahmans do for our education in the five thousand years before Britain came? I remind you: They asserted their right to pour hot lead into the ears of the low-caste man who should dare to study books. All learning belonged to them, they said. When the Muhammadans swarmed in and took us, even that was an improvement on the old Hindu régime. But only in Britain's day did education become the right of all, with state schools, colleges, and universities accessible îo all castes, communities, and peoples

== See also ==
- Dravidian movement
