= M.P.Agaram =

Malayaperumal Agaram, M. P. Agaram is a village and panchayat in Cuddalore district, Tamil Nadu, India.
