= V. Sankaran =

Indian politician

V. Sankaran was an Indian politician and former Member of the Legislative Assembly of Tamil Nadu. He was elected to the Tamil Nadu legislative assembly as an Indian National Congress candidate from Madurai Central constituency in 1957, and 1962 elections.
