= T. N. Sivagnanam Pillai =

Indian politician

Sir Tinnevely Nelliappa Sivagnanam Pillai
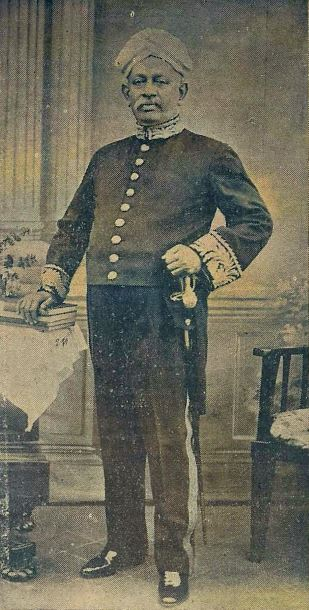

Minister of Development (Madras Presidency)
- In office 19 November 1923 – 3 December 1926
- Premier: Raja of Panagal
- Governor: Freeman Freeman-Thomas, 1st Marquess of Willingdon Sir Charles George Todhunter (acting), George Goschen, 2nd Viscount Goschen
- Preceded by: Kurma Venkata Reddy Naidu
- Succeeded by: R. N. Arogyasamy Mudaliar

Personal details
- Born: 1 April 1861 Tinnevely, Madras Presidency
- Died: June 13, 1936 (aged 75)
- Party: Justice Party
- Education: Madras Christian College
- Occupation: Legislator, civil servant
- Profession: Lawyer

Diwan Bahadur Sir Tinnevely Nelliappa Sivagnanam Pillai (1 April 1861 – 13 June 1936) was an Indian lawyer, civil servant and politician from the Madras Presidency. He belonged to the Justice Party. He served as the Minister of Development in the government of the Raja of Panagal from 1923 to 1926.

== Early life and education ==
Sivagnanam Pillai was born on 1 April 1861 to Nelliappa Pillai. He came from Tinnevely. He had his undergraduation in the Madurai Diraviyam Thayumanavar Hindu College, Tirunelveli, Tamil Nadu. He graduated from Madras Christian College. He completed law from Madras Law College in 1882 and practised as an advocate.

Sivagnanam Pillai was selected for the Provincial Civil Service and served as a Deputy Collector. Upon retirement, he joined the Justice Party. In 1919, he was elected to the Madras Legislative Council from Tinnevely. He replaced Kurma Venkata Reddy Naidu as Minister of Development on 19 November 1923.

== As Minister of Development ==
Sivagnanam Pillai was appointed Minister of Development in 1923, replacing Kurma Venkata Reddy Naidu. Critics often opine that this was a move planned by the Raja of Panagal to appease the Tamil-speaking people of the Presidency. Sivagnanam Pillai thus has the distinction of becoming the First Tamil Minister.

During his tenure as the Minister of Development, Sivagnanam Pillai participated in the 9th All-India Non-Brahmin Conference held at Madras on 19 December 1925. He was knighted in the 1926 New Year Honours list, and formally invested with his knighthood by the Viceroy, Lord Irwin, on 18 February 1927 at Delhi.

== Personal life and family ==
Former Governor General of India, Shri C Rajagopalachari while inaugurating a railway line in the then composite Tirunelveli District quipped: "This railway line is as straight as Sir T N Sivagnanam Pillai", which summarised his life as a Civil Servant and later as a Public Servant. Sivagnanam Pillai's father in law Ramalingam Pillai was a District Munsif at Thiruvaiyaru also in the 1880s.

Sivagnanam Pillai (known as "Mandri Pillai") had three children: T S Avudaiappa Pillai, Sivakami Ammal and T S Ramalingam Pillai. Avudaiappa Pillai, born 28 March 1897, a career civil servant initially served in the provincial Civil Service and after Indian Independence in 1947, served in the Indian Administrative Service until 1952. He acted as the Revenue Officer and Commissioner, Corporation of Madras in 1947. His wife, Mrs. Subbammal was a great sports enthusiast and was South India Table Tennis champion.

T S Ramalingam Pillai(known as "Judge Pillai" and by his elders as Sethu/ Ramaiah) named after his maternal grandfather, studied High School at P.S. High School, Mylapore (commuting by walk from his father's official residence at Alwarpet. Bemused relatives had observed that young Ramalingam Pillai preferred a spot near the staircase where he used to pore over his books for hours together and dozed off on the floor with just a sheet beneath), B.A. English Literature at St John's College, Palayamkottai (like his maternal uncle, he was also creatively inclined and staged Shakespeare's plays including Macbeth along with his beloved friend Thiru Vannamuthu), M. A. English Literature (Hons.) at Madras Christian College (where the acclaimed Dr Alexander Boyd and Mr J.R. Macphail, who taught him were so impressed with him, that they gave him a commendation certificate for his extraordinary knowledge of English Literature and his exemplary conduct) and Law at Trivandrum Law College. He passed the ICS (Indian Civil Services) examination and was provisionally ranked 3, but due to his handwriting could not make it to the selection list (comprising 12 recruits, he was ranked 13th). Thereafter, he began practicing law in Tirunelveli and slowly earned the appreciation of all the judges. But progress in the profession was slow and arduous. Further, WW II put a spoke to his career aspirations. Finally in 1944, he got selected as a District Munsif, through the Service Commission and got posted to Manjeri, now in Kerala. He went on to become a District and Sessions Judge and in 1967 was appointed as the Law Secretary to the Government of Tamil Nadu (Additional Chief Secretary cadre). He served as the Law Secretary to 3 Chief Ministers from 1967 to 1969. Post-retirement, he was appointed as a Member of the Pay Commission, by the Government of Tamil Nadu and then as a Member of the Official Languages Commission, New Delhi, by the Government of India. A self made man, a brilliant student - extremely intelligent and hardworking (on several occasions, while at school, due to power outage he is said to have studied under street lights) he was proficient in both Tamil (including the Saiva Siddhantha) and English Literature and has translated the Thirukural in English verse form (a labour of love for many years and type written by him on his personal typewriter), published in 1987 through the South Indian Saiva Siddhantha Kazhagam and the book release was made by Thiru V O C Subramanian (son of "Kappal Ottiya Thamizhan" Thiru V O Chidambaram Pillai and one tIndia's greatest freedom fighters, the function was attended by his dear and near ones. A keen listener, he seldom spoke and when he did, it was never about himself. Extremely unassuming, down to earth and guileless, he possessed limitless patience and tolerance and was never heard getting upset or complaining about anything or critical of anybody in life (despite suffering personal tragedies and innumerable privations throughout - he lost his sickly mother when he was very young and it seems the only time he saw his parents together was at his mother's death bed). Being full of kindness and empathy, he was always ready to help without the least expectation - a genial and gentle soul. Darwin's "Adapt or..." was practised by him with right earnestness and like the "Boy on the ...deck" (Casabianca), he cherished the foremost value contained therein. It appears that from childhood he was moulding his mind and developed an attitude of "never minding" the vicissitudes faced by him.

Shri Sankaran, retired IAS Officer had this to say about him: "He was God who walked on earth".

== Freemasonry ==
Sivagnanam Pillai was a prominent freemason and was a member of the Carnatic Lodge from 1905 to 1914 and 1925 to 1929.

== Notes ==
| Preceded by Kurma Venkata Reddy Naidu | Minister of Development (Madras Presidency); 19 November 1923 – 3 December 1926 | Succeeded by R. N. Arogyasamy Mudaliar |
