= P. T. Rajan =

Indian politician and former First Minister of Madras Presidency (1892-1974)

Sir Ponnambala Thiaga Rajan
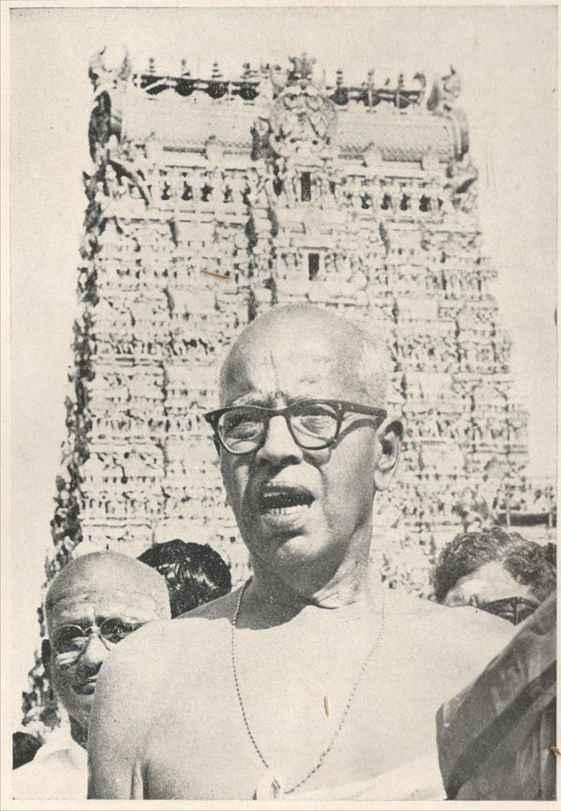
- Rajan in 1934

Member of Madras Legislative Assembly for Cumbum
- In office 1952–1957
- Governor: Sri Prakasa, A. J. John, Anaparambil
- First Minister: Chakravarti Rajagopalachari, K. Kamaraj

6th First Minister of Madras Presidency
- In office 4 April 1936 – 24 August 1936
- Governor: John Erskine, Lord Erskine, Kurma Venkata Reddy Naidu (acting)
- Preceded by: Raja of Bobbili
- Succeeded by: Raja of Bobbili

Personal details
- Born: 22 April 1892 Uthamapalayam, Madras Presidency, British India
- Died: 25 September 1974 (aged 82) Madurai, Tamil Nadu, India
- Party: Justice Party
- Children: P. T. R. Palanivel Rajan
- Education: The Leys School, Cambridge, Jesus College, Oxford
- Occupation: Politician
- Profession: Lawyer

Sir Ponnambala Thiaga Rajan (12 April 1892 – 25 September 1974) was the First Minister of Madras Presidency from 4 April 1936, to 24 August 1936 (143 Days). He was also the last President of the Justice Party. P. T. Rajan was born in an aristocratic Thondaimandala Vellalar family in Uthamapalayam. He attended The Leys School, Cambridge and later, Jesus College, Oxford. He graduated in history and law, and practiced as an advocate for some time before joining the Justice Party.

Rajan was elected to the Madras Legislative Council as a Justice Party candidate in 1920 and served as a legislator till his defeat in 1937. He held various offices such as the Minister of Public Works and then, the First Minister of Madras Presidency. From 1939 to 1944, Rajan supported Periyar but broke off and headed the rebel Justice Party till 1957. Rajan was elected to the Madras Legislative Assembly in 1952 and served as a legislator from 1952 to 1957. He also served interim speaker of Madras State Legislative Assembly in 1952. Rajan died in 1974 at the age of 82.

Rajan's son Palanivel Rajan served as a minister of the Dravida Munnetra Kazhagam and speaker of the Tamil Nadu Legislative Assembly from 1996 to 2001. Rajan's grandson Dr. Palanivel Thiaga Rajan (son of Palanivel Rajan) was the finance minister of Tamil Nadu and he is the Minister of Information Technology and Digital Services of Tamil Nadu.

== Early life ==
Ponnambala Thiaga Rajan was born in 1892 in Theni and belonged to the Kondaikatti Vellalar community. He was educated at Ley's School, Cambridge and graduated in history from Jesus College, Oxford University in 1915. He later studied law at the Inner Temple and was called to the Bar in 1917 and practised as an advocate before joining the Justice Party in the early 1920s.

== Political career ==
Rajan stood as a Justice party candidate in the 1920 elections and was elected as a member of the Madras Legislative Council. He was also instrumental in getting W. P. A. Soundrapandian Nadar nominated to the Madras Legislative Council as a Justice Party nominee.

=== In government ===
In 1930, when the Justice Party returned to power after a gap of 4 years, Rajan was appointed Minister of Public Works. He served as a minister in the governments of P. Munuswamy Naidu and the Raja of Bobbili. On 4 April 1936, he succeeded the Raja of Bobbili as the First Minister of Madras Presidency and held the post till 24 August 1936, when the Raja of Bobbili once again became the First minister. He was knighted on 1 February 1937.

In 1939, he joined Periyar and wholeheartedly supported his demand for secession from India. However, he broke off with a few others in 1944 when Periyar renamed the Justice Party as Dravidar Kazhagam. He was against the Principles of Periyar as Atheism and also since Periyar converted the political party into a non-political social organization.

=== As President of Justice Party ===
Rajan along with a few dissidents floated a new Justice Party and claimed that their organisation was the original Justice Party. B. Ramachandra Reddi, who was President of the Madras Legislative Council between 1930 and 1937 was tentatively elected Party President but resigned in 1945 and was succeeded by Rajan. The Justice Party did not contest in the 1946 Assembly elections but participated in the 1951 elections, the first as a part of independent India. The Justice Party contested nine seats as an unrecognised state-level party of which the party won one. Rajan stood from Madurai North as well as Cumbum. While Rajan lost badly from Madurai North winning only 11% of the total votes polled and finished third, he won by a margin of 11,359 votes from Cumbum. The Justice Party did not contest in the 1957 Assembly elections and was eventually dissolved.

Rajan contested as an independent from Uthamapalayam in the 1957 Assembly elections and polled 24,256 votes losing to K. Pandiaraj of the Indian National Congress by a margin of 6,303 votes. Rajan did not contest any more elections after the defeat.

=== As President of Vellalar Sangam ===
He also served as the president of the Vellalar Sangam in Tamil Nadu, an organization representing all 42 subcastes of the Vellalar community.The Sangam worked to promote social welfare, education, and political representation for the Vellalar community.

== Political activism and ideology ==
P. T. Rajan, as a leading non-Brahmin leader, supported the appointment of non-Brahmin trustees to temples in Tamil Nadu. In the early 1950s, through his efforts, the present panchaloha idol of Lord Ayappan was installed at Sabarimalai and a procession was taken all over Madras state. A road in K. K. Nagar, Chennai has been named in his memory as "Sir P.T. Rajan Road".

== Family ==
P. T. Rajan's uncle M. T. Subramania Mudaliar of Uthamapalayam was a member of the Dravidian Association and one of the early leaders of the Non-Brahmin Movement. He was always consulted with regard to the choice of Ministers by early First Ministers such as the Raja of Panagal.

P. T. Rajan's son Palanivel Rajan was a politician of the Dravida Munnetra Kazhagam. He served as the Speaker of the Tamil Nadu Legislative Assembly from 1996 to 2001 and in 2006, he served as the Minister for Hindu Religious and Charitable Endowments in the Government of M. Karunanidhi briefly before his death on 20 May 2006. Rajan's grandson Dr. Palanivel Thiaga Rajan (son of Palanivel Rajan) is the finance minister of Tamil Nadu from 07.05.2021.

== Criticism ==
Rajan's lavish spendings as Minister for Development under the Munuswamy Naidu regime at the height of the Great Depression along with those of others, invited the wrath of the media.

The newspaper India reported in the 25 March 1932 edition:

When the country is on fire, when the axe of retrenchment has fallen on the poor and when the people are experiencing intense suffering under the heavy burden of taxation, the Madras ministers have started on their tours immediately after passing of the Budget. The tour of Honourable Mr. P. T. Rajan causes us heart-burning. We have to feel sorry that the Ministers have been reduced to such a deplorable state. Mr. Rajan is going to Hindupur today which is at a distance of 400 miles from Madras for laying the foundation stone for a Taluk Board School. For this trivial affair, the Minister is squandering the money of the poor tax payer

== Notes ==
Preceded by	Member of the Madras Legislative Council; 1920 - 1937	Succeeded by
Preceded by M. R. Sethuratnam Iyer	Minister of Development, Public Works and Registration (Madras Presidency); 1930 - 1937	Succeeded by Maulana Yakub Hasan Sait
Preceded by Raja of Bobbili	First Minister of Madras Presidency; 4 April 1936 – 24 August 1936	Succeeded by Raja of Bobbili
Preceded by E. V. Ramasami	President of the South Indian Liberal Federation; 1945 - 1957	Succeeded by Party dissolved
Preceded by None	Member of the Madras Legislative Assembly for Cumbum; 1952 - 1957	Succeeded by
