= S. Paulraj =

Indian politician

Solaialagu Paulraj ex MLA is an Indian politician. He is popularly known as So. Paulraj. He was a DMK MLA and State Vice President of DMK Labour Union. His father S.R.Solaialagu Konar is one of the prominent personality in Madurai. In 2001 S.Paulraj was defeated by margin of 143 votes after M.K. Alagiri worked against DMK candidates in Madurai.

He was a founder of ICF DMK Labour Union. He served as a Trustee of Madurai Meenakshi Amman Temple. He was a founder member of DMK. He worked at Southern Railways before becoming an MLA.

He had 5 siblings: S. Sundarajan - sports officer Police dept, a Congress Party Loyalist; S. Dhanuskodi was a National member of the CPI Marxist, S. Navaneethakrishnan former Deputy mayor of Madurai AIADMK & AIADMK District Secretary Madurai, close veteran of former Chief Minister MGR; S. Paramanathan State Secretary MGR Mandram AMMK ( TTV party) former District Sec. AIADMK MGR youth wing Madurai.
