= R. Sundarrajan (politician) =

Indian politician (died 2020)

R. Sundarrajan (died July 7, 2020) was an Indian politician and member of the Tamil Nadu Legislative Assembly from the Madurai Central constituency. He was the state treasurer of the Desiya Murpokku Dravidar Kazhagam party. He began his career as a Vijayakanth fan club member and later became the state president of the Vijayakanth fans' welfare club.
