= P. Subbarayan =

Indian politician (1889–1962)

Paramasivan Subbarayan
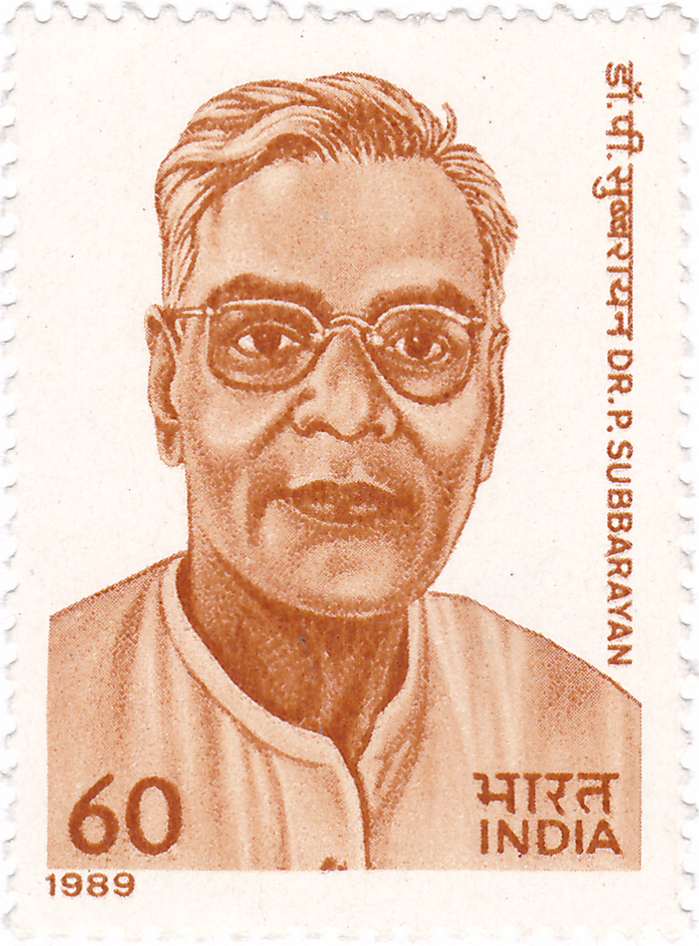

Governor of Maharashtra
- In office 17 April 1962 – 6 October 1962
- Prime Minister: Jawaharlal Nehru
- Preceded by: Sri Prakasa
- Succeeded by: Vijayalakshmi Pandit

Union Minister for Transport and Communication
- In office 1959–1962
- President: Rajendra Prasad
- Prime Minister: Jawaharlal Nehru

Member of Parliament (Lok Sabha) for Tiruchengode
- In office 1957–1962
- President: Rajendra Prasad
- Prime Minister: Jawaharlal Nehru
- Preceded by: S. Kandaswamy Baby
- Succeeded by: K. Anbazhagan

India's Ambassador to Indonesia
- In office 1949–1951
- Monarch: George VI of the United Kingdom (till 26 January 1950)
- President: Rajendra Prasad (from 26 January 1950)
- Governor-General: Chakravarti Rajagopalachari (till 26 January 1950)
- Prime Minister: Jawaharlal Nehru
- Preceded by: None
- Succeeded by: Alagappan

Minister of Police and Home (Madras Presidency)
- In office 23 March 1947 – 1948
- Premier: O. P. Ramaswamy Reddiyar
- Governor: Archibald Edward Nye

Minister of Law and Education (Madras Presidency)
- In office 14 July 1937 – 29 October 1939
- Premier: Chakravarti Rajagopalachari
- Governor: John Erskine, Lord Erskine

3rd First Minister of Madras Presidency
- In office 4 December 1926 – 27 October 1930
- Governor: George Goschen, 2nd Viscount Goschen, Sir Norman Marjoribanks (acting)
- Preceded by: Raja of Panagal
- Succeeded by: P. Munuswamy Naidu

Minister of Local Self-Government (Madras Presidency)
- In office 4 December 1926 – 27 October 1930
- Premier: P. Subbarayan
- Governor: George Goschen, 2nd Viscount Goschen, Sir Norman Majoribanks (acting)
- Preceded by: Raja of Panagal
- Succeeded by: P. Munuswamy Naidu

5th President of BCCI
- In office 1938–1946
- Preceded by: Sir K. S. Digvijaysinhji
- Succeeded by: Anthony de Mello

Personal details
- Born: 11 September 1889 Salem district, British Raj
- Died: 6 October 1962 (aged 73) Madras
- Party: Indian National Congress
- Spouse: Radhabai Subbarayan
- Children: General P. P. Kumaramangalam, Gopal Kumaramangalam, Mohan Kumaramangalam, Parvathi Krishnan
- Education: Presidency College; Oxford University; Trinity College Dublin
- Occupation: politician
- Profession: lawyer

Paramasivan Subbarayan (11 September 1889 – 6 October 1962) was an Indian politician, freedom fighter and diplomat and was the First Minister of Madras Presidency, India's ambassador to Indonesia and Union Minister of Transport and Communications in Jawaharlal Nehru's government. He was the father of General P. P. Kumaramangalam, who served as India's Chief of Army staff, and of politician Mohan Kumaramangalam. He was also the grandfather of INC and BJP politician and Union Minister Rangarajan Kumaramangalam.

Subbarayan was born at the British Raj era on 11 September 1889 in the family estate at Kumaramangalam, Salem district and had his education at Presidency College, Trinity College Dublin, the University of London and Christ Church, Oxford. In 1922, he was nominated to the Madras Legislative Council. He served as the First Minister of Madras Presidency from 4 December 1926 to 27 October 1930.

In 1933, Subbarayan joined the Indian National Congress and served as the Minister of Law and Education in Rajaji's cabinet and the Minister of Police and Home in Ramaswamy Reddiar's cabinet. Subbarayan participated and was imprisoned in the Quit India Movement. He served as independent India's ambassador to Indonesia and as Union Minister from 1959 to 1962. Subbarayan died on 6 October 1962 at the age of 73. He was the Governor of Maharashtra until his death.

== Early life and education ==
Subbarayan was born under British Raj colonial rule to Paramasiva Gounder in the family estate of Kumaramangalam near Tiruchengode, Namakkal district on 11 September 1889. He belonged to the family of Zamindars. He graduated from the Presidency College and obtained his M.A. and LLD from the Christ Church, Oxford and Trinity College Dublin respectively. He started practising as an advocate of the Madras High Court in 1918.

== Political career ==
In 1922, Subbarayan was nominated to the Madras Legislative Council as an independent candidate representing the landowners of the South-Central division of the Madras Presidency and served as a Council Secretary. He took the side of C. R. Reddy and the Swarajists and voted against the Raja of Pangal during the no-confidence motion of 1923.

=== First Minister of Madras Presidency (1926-1930) ===
In the Assembly elections which took place on 8 November 1926, no party was able to get a clean majority. The Swaraj Party won 41 of the 98 seats and emerged as the single largest party while the Justice Party won 21. It was a setback for the Justice Party and its incumbent First Minister, the Raja of Panagal. However, none of the parties could form the Government as they did not have a clean majority.

The Governor invited the Swarajya Party to take the lead in forming a coalition government but the latter refused. The Justice Party did not have enough seats. Hence, the Governor chose Subbarayan, who was not affiliated to either of these parties, to form the Government and nominated 34 new members to the Madras Legislative Council to support him. An independent ministry was formed with A. Ranganatha Mudaliar and R. N. Arogyaswamy Mudaliar as the second and third ministers. The Justice Party took the place of an opposition.

Subbarayan's Cabinet
Portfolio	Minister
Education, Local Self-Government	P. Subbarayan (also First Minister) (1926–1930)
Public health, excise	A. Ranganatha Mudaliar (1926–1928)
Public health, excise	S. Muthiah Mudaliar (1928–1930)
Development	R. N. Arogyasamy Mudaliar (1926–1928)
Development	M. R. Sethuratnam Iyer (1928–1930)
Source: Encyclopaedia of Political Parties

Because Subbarayan's regime was appointed and largely controlled by the Governor, it became the target of strong criticism both from the Justicites as well as the Swarajists. In March 1927, P. Munuswamy Naidu of the Justice Party passed a motion recommending salary cuts for Government ministers. However, they were defeated by a margin of 41 votes. A no-confidence motion was passed on 23 August 1927, but was defeated 56 to 67 with the support of the Governor and the members nominated by him.

The Simon Commission was appointed by the British Parliament in 1927 to report on the working of the progress of the Montagu-Chelmsford reforms. The Swarajya Party moved a resolution to boycott the commission and this was passed 61 to 50 with 12 remaining neutral. Subbarayan opposed the resolution but his cabinet ministers Ranganatha Mudaliar and Arogyaswamy Mudaliar supported it. Subbarayan resigned as First Minister, but at the same time, he also compelled his ministers to submit their resignations. Fearing the possibility of the formation of a Swarajya Party-Justice Party coalition Government, the Governor stepped in to foster discord amongst the opposition. In order to obtain the support of the Raja of Panagal, he appointed Krishnan Nair, a leading member of the Justice Party as his Law Member. Led by the Raja of Panagal, the Justice Party switched sides and lent its support to the Subbarayan government. Soon afterwards, the Justice Party passed a resolution welcoming the Simon Commission. The Simon Commission visited Madras on 28 February 1928 and 18 February 1929 and was boycotted by the Swarajya Party and the Indian National Congress. However, the Justicites and the Subbarayan Government accorded the commission a warm reception.

In the 1930 elections, due to the non-participation of the Indian National Congress and the Swarajya Party, the Justice Party won an overwhelming majority and was voted to power. Subbarayan was succeeded as First Minister by Munuswamy Naidu.

==== Policies ====
The Raja of Panagal government had introduced the Communal Government Order (G. O. No. 613) in 1921 which introduced reservations in the Presidency. However, the provisions of this act were not implemented till 1927. The Subbarayan government, therefore, introduced the Communal G. O. Ms No. 1021 to implement the 1921 order. The act was introduced by S. Muthiah Mudaliar, the Education Minister in Subbarayan's cabinet on 11 April 1927. This act, it is believed, introduced provisions for reservations for Dalits and increased representation for Indian Christians and Muslims. At the same time, it reduced the reservations for Brahmins from 22% to 16% and non-Brahmins from 48% to 42%. This act was in effect till India's independence on 15 August 1947.

Subbarayan introduced the Madras District Municipalities Act and Local Boards Act during his tenure. The Annamalai University, founded by Rajah Sir Annamalai Chettiar was opened by Subbarayan in Chettinad in 1929. The Annamalai University is the first residential university in Madras Presidency.

=== Member of Legislative Council (1930-1937) ===
Subbarayan was re-elected as an independent to the Madras Legislative Council in 1930. As a member of the legislature, Subbarayan was instrumental in introducing prohibition in Salem district in 1930. Prohibition was enforced in Salem till 1943 when it was scrapped by the British. In 1932, C. S. Ranga Iyer passed the Untouchability Abolition Bill in the Imperial Legislative Council. On 1 November 1932, Subbarayan proposed the Temple Entry Bill which permitted low-caste Hindus and Dalits enter Hindu temples and made their prohibition illegal and punishable. He also passed a copy of the resolution and the proceedings of the council to Mahatma Gandhi who was in jail. The Viceroy, however, refused permission explaining that temple entry was an all-India problem and should not be dealt with in a provincial basis even while clearing Ranga Iyer's bill. The Temple Entry Bill was not passed until the Indian National Congress came to power in 1937. Subbarayan had been a follower of Mahatma Gandhi from his early days and he officially joined the Indian National Congress in 1933. He also served as the President of the Tamil Nadu Harijan Sevak Sangh.

=== State cabinet and Independence activism (1937-47) ===
Subbarayan was an admirer of Indian National Congress leader Chakravarti Rajagopalachari (Rajaji) right from his early days. Rajaji had been his personal lawyer in property cases. In 1937, when the Indian National Congress swept to power in the Madras Presidency and Rajaji took over as the Prime Minister of the Presidency, he appointed Subbarayan the Minister of Law and Education. Subbarayan resigned along with other members of the Rajaji cabinet when war was declared in 1939. Subbarayan also served as the President of the Board of Control for Cricket in India from 1937–38 to 1945–46.

Subbarayan actively participated in the Quit India Movement and was arrested along with other Congress leaders as Sathyamurthy and M. Bakthavatsalam.

In 1947, he served as a Minister for Home and Police in the Ramaswamy Reddiar Cabinet in Madras and was a member of the Constituent Assembly of India. He served as a member of the Provincial Constitution Committee.

=== Foreign service (1949-1951) ===
From 1949 to 1951, Subbarayan served as independent India's first ambassador to Indonesia. He was instrumental in the signing of a mutual treaty of friendship with the Indonesian Foreign Minister Mohammad Roem on 3 March 1951. Subbarayan's tenure came to an end in 1951 and he was succeeded by Alagappan.

=== Later years (1952-1962) ===
On his return to India, Subbarayan was elected president of the Tamil Nadu Congress Committee (TNCC). He also served as a member of Rajya Sabha from 1954 to 1957. He was a member of the first Official Language Commission constituted by Prime Minister Jawaharlal Nehru on 7 June 1955, under the chairmanship of B. G. Kher. The commission delivered its report on 31 July 1956. It recommended a number of steps to eventually replace English with Hindi as the sole official language of India. Subbarayan and another member – Suniti Kumar Chatterji from West Bengal – did not agree with its findings and added dissenting notes to the report. Later when the Indian President Rajendra Prasad sought his opinion on making Hindi as the sole official language, Subbarayan advised against it.

In 1957, Subbarayan was elected to the Lok Sabha from Tiruchengode and served as a member till 1962. He served as the Minister of Transport and Communications in the Government of India union cabinet from 1959 to 1962. He was elected again in 1962 but was instead made Governor of Maharashtra.

== Other interests ==
Subbarayan took a keen interest in sports during his lifetime. He wrote numerous articles on cricket and was the Founder-president of the Indian Cricket Federation, the first association in the Madras Presidency to represent Indian cricketing interests. He also served as the president of the Board of Control for Cricket in India (BCCI) during the Second World War. With Sir John Beaumont and Sikandar Hayat Khan, he formed the commission that investigated the return of Lala Amarnath from the India's tour of England in 1936. He also served as the president of the Madras Olympic Association and the Madras Hockey Association.

== Death ==
Subbarayan died at the age of 73 on 6 October 1962.

== Family and legacy ==
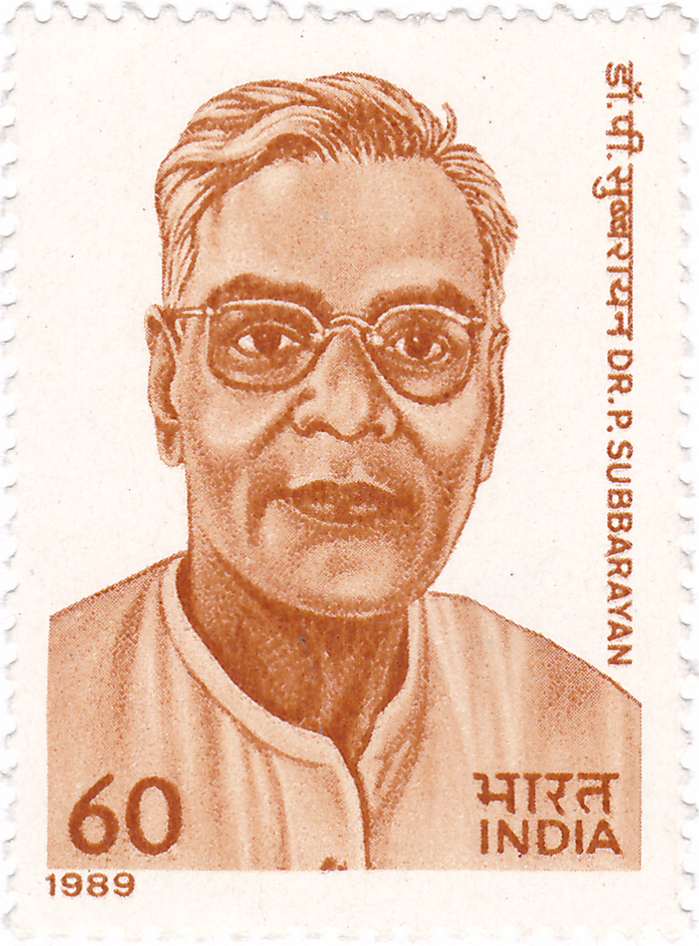
Subbarayan on a 1989 stamp of India

Subbarayan married Kailash Radhabai Kulmud, a Mangalorean Brahmo of Brahmin parentage, who was his colleague in Presidency College, by Brahmo rites despite opposition from family members. Radhabai Subbarayan was an active campaigner for women's rights and served as a member of the Indian parliament.

Subbarayan's eldest son Mohan Kumaramangalam was a minister in Indira Gandhi's cabinet. His second son, General P. P. Kumaramangalam was a Second World War veteran and served as India's Chief of Army staff. A third son Gopal Kumaramangalam headed important public sector undertakings. Mohan's son and Subbarayan's grandson Rangarajan Kumaramangalam was a minister in Indian National Congress and NDA governments. Subbarayan's daughter Parvathi Krishnan was a politician belonging to the Communist Party of India. She was a Member of the Rajya Sabha from 1954 to 1957 and represented Coimbatore in the Lok Sabha three times.

A portrait of Subbarayan was unveiled in the central hall of the Indian Parliament on 16 October 1989.

== See also ==
- Political families of the world

== Notes ==
Preceded by	Member of the Madras Legislative Council; 1922 – 1939; 1947–1948	Succeeded by
Preceded by Raja of Panagal	First Minister of Madras Presidency; 4 December 1926 – 27 October 1930	Succeeded by P. Munuswamy Naidu
Preceded by	Minister of Law and Education (Madras Presidency); 1937–1939	Succeeded by Governor's rule
Preceded by Jamsahib Digvijaysinh of Nawanagar	President of the Board of Control for Cricket in India; 1937/38 – 1945/46	Succeeded by Anthony De Mello
Preceded by T. Prakasam	Minister of Home and Police (Madras Presidency); 24 March 1947 – 5 April 1948	Succeeded by Omandur Ramaswamy Reddiar
Preceded by None	India's Ambassador to Indonesia; 1949–1951	Succeeded by Alagappan
Preceded by	Member of Indian Parliament (Rajya Sabha); 1954–1957	Succeeded by
Preceded by S. K. Baby	Member of Indian Parliament (Lok Sabha) for Tiruchengode; 1957–1962	Succeeded by K. Anbazhagan
