= Veerappan (2016 film) =

2016 film by Ram Gopal Varma

- Theatrical release poster
- Directed by: Ram Gopal Varma
- Written by: R. D. Tailang
- Screenplay by: Ram Gopal Varma
- Story by: Ram Gopal Varma
- Produced by: Raina Sachin Joshi
- Starring: Sandeep Bharadwaj; Sachiin Joshi; Lisa Ray; Usha Jadhav
- Cinematography: Aniket Khandagale
- Edited by: Anwar Ali
- Music by: Songs: Jeet Gannguli; Shaarib-Toshi; Background Score: John Stewart Eduri
- Production companies: Viking Media & Entertainment
- Distributed by: AA Films
- Release date: 27 May 2016 (India)
- Running time: 125 minutes
- Country: India
- Language: Hindi

Veerappan is a 2016 Indian Hindi-language biographical action crime film written and directed by Ram Gopal Varma. The film is based on the real-life Indian bandit Veerappan and the events leading to Operation Cocoon, a mission to capture and kill him. The film is a remake of the Kannada film Killing Veerappan (2016) starring Shiva Rajkumar. The film stars Sandeep Bharadwaj (who reprises his role from the original), Sachiin J Joshi, Lisa Ray and Usha Jadhav.

The film was released on May 27, 2016. Veerappan received mixed reviews with critics praising the narration, production design, direction and performances of Sandeep Bharadwaj, and Usha Jadav.

== Plot ==
Koose Muniswamy Veerappan, during his teenage years starts working as an assistant to his relative Sevi Gounder, a notorious poacher and sandalwood smuggler. His father and relatives, whose village lay in the forest area, were also known to be poachers and smugglers. Veerappan (Sandeep Bharadwaj), dominant in Sathyamangalam Forest in the states of Tamil Nadu and Karnataka, defies the governments, and Indian Border Security paramilitary forces, and maintains a small army. He is wanted for killing approximately 184 people, about half of whom were police officers, including senior police and forest officials. He was also wanted for poaching about 200 elephants and smuggling ivory worth US$2,600,000 and about 10,000 tonnes of sandalwood worth approximately US$22,000,000.

In 1991, Veerappan and his chief Intel Gandhi, beheaded IFS Officer P. Srinivas. Years later, Veerappan avenges the death of his close associate Gandhi by misleading Special Task Force (STF) personnel in their covert operation, through Gandhi's unnamed notorious informer. The covert mission led by T. Harikrishna S.P., and his informant S.I. Shakeel Ahmed to kill Veerappan fails miserably. Veerappan and his army brutally assassinate all the STF officers in the operation and snatch their arms.

The Tamil Nadu STF chief K. Vijay Kumar I.P.S. appoints his associate, an undercover I.P.S. spy in the Karnataka region, a master-strategist (Sachiin J Joshi), who puts in place Operation Cocoon through a network of tribals, and informers, such as a deputy spy, a woman STF spy and landlord (Lisa Ray), who befriends and rents out a house to Muthulakshmi-the wife of Veerappan (Usha Jadhav). On the other hand, a team of loyal undercover cops led by Rambo Krishna, leaves Palar base of STF, near M. M. Hills, 100 kilometres (62 mi) from Kollegal of Karnataka along with a team of 41 members which includes police from two states, forest officials, forest watchers and informers. The team travels in two vehicles, of which one is a bus carrying most of the team members, and a jeep carrying K. Gopalakrishnan, the IPS officer. Veerappan's gang plants landmines on the road in more than 14 places to halt their approach, and during the Palar blast, K. Gopalakrishnan, standing on the footboard of the jeep, is thrown out, and suffers severe injuries, leaving the police to retaliate and ultimately prevent the snatching of arms.

After a few failed attempts, including the one led by another undercover cop, disguised as a subordinate to Islamic underworld don - Kadaani, to negotiate an arms deal with Veerappan's gang, the STF team led by master-strategist, and an ex-spy turned timberyard owner-Kumar, finally succeeded on 18 October 2004. On that day, Veerappan is escorted out of the forest by Kumar, who earlier infiltrates Veerappan's gang in disguise to negotiate another arms deal with Velupillai Prabhakaran. Subsequently, Veerappan and his men board an ambulance stationed at Papparapatti village in Dharmapuri district. Veerappan and his men are first warned and then asked to surrender, which was denied, and the men start firing at the STF personnel. The STF retaliate by firing grenades and gunfire, subsequently, Veerappan and his men are killed on the spot.

== Cast ==
- Sandeep Bharadwaj as Veerappan
- Sachiin Joshi as Cop
- Lisa Ray as Shreya
- Usha Jadhav as Muthulakshmi
- Nissar Khan as Vijay Kumar
- Krishna Srikanth Iyengar as Kumar (Ex Cop)
- Chetanya Adib as Shashi
- Raj Singh Arora as Gopal
- Sunit Razdan as Bhupi
- Vineet Sharma as Dinesh
- Navin Prabhakar as Rajan
- Akash Sinha as Govindan
- Shaneel Sinha as Gandhi
- Raj Premi as Madhani
- Zareen Khan as Item number Khallas

== Production ==
Pratik Vijay Redij is the production designer for the film. Following the success of Ram Gopal Varma's second docudrama, Killing Veerappan, Varma met with Sachiin J Joshi, and emphasized his interest in developing an international biopic version in Hindi language with a new cast and crew. The biopic depicts the dramatic rise of Veerappan. In an Interview with "Indian Express" Varma stated that “Making Veerappan is not about glorifying a criminal, but it is to put a mirror to how he was allowed to happen in the first place”.

== Soundtrack ==
The song Khallas was directly lifted from Get Low, by DJ Snake.

No.	Title	Lyrics	Music	Singer(s)	Length
1.	"Muchhi Re"	Manoj Muntashir	Jeet Gannguli	Mohan Kanan	3:08
2.	"Veer Veer Veerappan"	Manoj Yadav	Shaarib-Toshi	Payal Dev, Toshi Sabri, Vee	3:51
3.	"Khallas"	Manoj Yadav	Shaarib-Toshi	Jasmine Sandlas, Toshi Sabri	3:02
4.	"Veer Veer Veerappan (Rap Version)"	Manoj Yadav	Shaarib-Toshi	Payal Dev, Toshi Sabri, Vee	4:13

== Reception ==
Upon its release, Veerappan received mixed reviews with critics praising narration, production design, direction and performances of Sandeep Bharadwaj, and Usha Jadav. In an Interview with "Indian Express" Varma stated that “Making Veerappan is not about glorifying a criminal, but it is to put a mirror to how he was allowed to happen in the first place”. The CBFC has cleared the film with a single cut. The "Times of India" gave the film 3.5/5 for its visual appeal, and 3/5 for direction.
