= The Hunt for Veerappan =

- Release poster
- Genre: True crime docuseries
- Based on: Veerappan
- Directed by: Selvamani Selvaraj
- Composer: Jhanu Chanthar
- Country of origin: India
- Original languages: English; Tamil; Kannada
- No. of episodes: 4

Production
- Producer: Apoorva Bakshi
- Cinematography: Monisha Thyagarajan; Udit Khurana; David Bolen; Gururaj Dixit
- Production company: Awedacious Originals

Original release
- Network: Netflix
- Release: 4 August 2023

The Hunt for Veerappan is a 2023 Indian English-language true crime docuseries by Netflix. Directed by Selvamani Selvaraj and produced by Apoorva Bakshi and Monisha Thyagarajan, the four-part series will explore the untold and unheard stories behind the dreaded Indian bandit turned domestic terrorist Veerappan.

== Release ==
The series was premiered on 4 August 2023 on Netflix.

== Reception ==
The Hunt for Veerappan mostly received positive reviews from critics. Anvita Singh of India Today gave it a rating of 3.5/5 and calls it a "balanced take on Veerappan's life and death." Rohan Naahar of The Indian Express also gave it a rating of 3.5/5 and says, "Netflix documentary is engaging, but it comes dangerously close to having sympathy for the devil."

== See also ==
- Koose Munisamy Veerappan (TV series)
- Killing Veerappan
- Veerappan (2016 film)
- Attahasa
