= Koose Munisamy Veerappan (TV series) =

- Release poster
- Genre: True crime docuseries
- Created by: Jeyachandra Hashmi, Prabbhavathi RV, Vasanth Balakrishnan
- Based on: Veerappan
- Written by: Jeyachandra Hashmi, Sharath Jothi, Vasanth Balakrishnan
- Directed by: Sharath Jothi
- Music by: Satish Raghunathan
- Country of origin: India
- Original language: Tamil
- No. of episodes: 6

Production
- Producer: Prabbhavathi RV
- Cinematography: Raj Kumar PM
- Editor: Ram Pandian
- Running time: 256 mins
- Production company: Dheeran Productions

Original release
- Network: ZEE5
- Release: 14 December 2023

Koose Munisamy Veerappan is a 2023 Indian Tamil-language true crime docuseries by ZEE5, created by Jeyachandra Hashmi, Prabbhavathi and Vasanth Balakrishnan. It is directed by Sharath Jothi and produced by Prabhavathi RV. It premiered on 14 December 2023. The series explores the life of Veerappan using footage shot by Nakkeeran Gopal and archived by Nakkheeran.

== Overview ==
The series delves into the life of the infamous Indian poacher and domestic terrorist Veerappan, and features unseen real-life footage along with bits of narration by the bandit himself.

Affirming the authenticity of the series, Journalist Nakkeeran Gopal in an official statement said, "We have invested huge efforts and taken significant risks to secure an interview with Veerappan. For the first time, this detailed version of the interview will be presented in a documentary narrative to the audience on the ZEE5 OTT platform under the title Koose Munisamy Veerappan."

== Episodes ==
=== Season 1 ===
No.	Title	Directed by	Written by	Original release date
1	"First Blood"	Sharath Jothi	Jeyachandra Hashmi, Sharath Jothi, Vasanth Balakrishnan	14 December 2023
2	"Into The Wild"	Sharath Jothi	Jayachandran Hashmi, Sharath Jothi, Vasanth Balakrishnan	14 December 2023
3	"The War"	Sharath Jothi	Jayachandran Hashmi, Sharath Jothi, Vasanth Balakrishnan	14 December 2023
4	"The Hunt for"	Sharath Jothi	Jayachandran Hashmi, Sharath Jothi, Vasanth Balakrishnan	14 December 2023
5	"Bait Worms"	Sharath Jothi	Jayachandran Hashmi, Sharath Jothi, Vasanth Balakrishnan	14 December 2023
6	"The beginning"	Sharath Jothi	Jayachandran Hashmi, Sharath Jothi, Vasanth Balakrishnan	14 December 2023

== Cast ==
- Mahe Thangam as Veerappan
- Nakkeeran Gopal, journalist & MD of Nakkheeran Publications
- Pa Pa Mohan, advocate
- DGP Retd. Alexander IPS
- N. Ram, former editor of The Hindu
- Seeman, leader NTK party
- Jeeva Thangavel, journalist
- Rohini (actress), social worker

== Marketing ==
The trailer of the series was released on 23 November 2023.

== Premiere and availability ==
"Koose Munisamy Veerappan" was scheduled to premiere exclusively on ZEE5 as a part of its original programming, on 8 December 2023. The release was pushed to 14 December after the devastating rains and floods in Chennai. The series will be available for viewers both in India and across the globe.

== Reception ==
"Koose Munisamy Veerappan" received mostly positive reviews. The New Indian Express commented that the series is a "crash course into the tale of the notorious anti-hero." South First published, "If you want to learn the truth, Koose Munisamy Veerappan is a documentary you must not miss." NTV (India) rated it 3 out of 5 stars and called it a must watch series.

== See also ==
- The Hunt for Veerappan
- Killing Veerappan
- Veerappan (2016 film)
- Attahasa
