= Killing Veerappan =

- Poster
- Directed by: Ram Gopal Varma
- Written by: Ram Gopal Varma; K Balaji
- Screenplay by: Ram Gopal Varma; K. Balaji
- Story by: Ram Gopal Varma
- Based on: Operation Cocoon
- Produced by: B. V. Manjunath; B. S. Sudhindra; E. Shivaprakash
- Starring: Shiva Rajkumar; Rahaao; Sandeep Bharadwaj; Yagna Shetty; Sanchari Vijay; Parul Yadav
- Cinematography: Rammy
- Edited by: Anwar Ali
- Music by: Score: Ravi Shankar; Songs: Ravi Shankar; Rajashekar; Munna Kasi; Sathya Kashyap; Sandy
- Production company: ZED3 Pictures
- Distributed by: G. R. Pictures
- Release date: 1 January 2016 (India)
- Running time: 151 minutes
- Country: India
- Language: Kannada
- Box office: est. ₹20 crore (US$2.1 million)

Killing Veerappan is a 2016 Indian Kannada-language biographical Crime film directed by Ram Gopal Varma, who co-wrote the film with K. Balaji. The film is based on the events leading to Operation Cocoon to capture or kill Indian bandit Veerappan. Featuring Shiva Rajkumar in the central role touted to be based on N. K. Senthamarai Kannan, the then Superintendent of police, with the Indian Special Task Force, and the spy who masterminded Operation Cocoon.

The Kannada version was released in over 200 screens in the state of Karnataka on 1 January 2016. Upon its wide release, critics praised the performances, background score, cinematography, screenplay, casting, and direction while becoming a box office success, and subsequently got screened in Kannada cinema section at the 9th Bengaluru International Film Festival 2017.

The Telugu dubbed version was released on 7 January 2016 to positive reviews and had a decent run at the overseas box-office. The Kannada version has garnered three nominations at the 2nd IIFA Utsavam including Best Picture in Kannada, while Parul Yadav and Yagna Shetty have each received the Performance In A Leading Role and Supporting Role - Female respectively. The film has also garnered five nominations; including Parul Yadav winning Critics Choice Award for Best Actress at the 6th SIIMA Awards, and one nomination for Best Actress at the 64th Filmfare Awards South. The film was remade into Hindi as Veerappan (2016) with Bharadwaj reprising his role.

== Plot ==
Forest brigand Veerappan (Sandeep Bhardwaj), dominant in Sathyamangalam Forest in the states of Tamil Nadu, Karnataka and Kerala, defies the governments, and Indian Border security paramilitary forces, and maintains a small army of his own. He is wanted for killing approximately 184 people, about half of whom were police officers, including senior police and forest officials. He was also wanted for poaching about 200 elephants and smuggling ivory worth US$2,600,000 and about 10,000 tonnes of sandalwood worth approximately US$22,000,000.

In 1991, Veerappan and his chief Intel, Gandhi (Sadh Orhan), behead IFS Officer P. Srinivas (Gadda Viji). Years later, Veerappan avenges the death of his close associate Gandhi by misleading Special Task Force (STF) personnel in their covert operation, through Gandhi's unnamed notorious informer (Aziz Naser). The covert mission led by T. Harikrishna S.P. (Rockline Venkatesh), and his informer S.I. Shakeel Ahmed (Rajesh Nataranga) to kill Veerappan fails miserably. Veerappan, and his army brutally assassinate all the STF officers in the operation, and snatch their arms.

The Tamil Nadu STF chief K. Vijay Kumar I.P.S. (K. S. Sridhar) appoints his associate, an undercover I.P.S. spy in the Karnataka region, a master-strategist (Shiva Rajkumar), who puts in place the Operation Cocoon through a network of tribals, and informers, such as Deputy spy (Sanchari Vijay), a woman STF spy and landlord, Shriya (Parul Yadav), who befriends and rents out a house to Muthulakshmi-the wife of Veerappan (Yagna Shetty). On the other hand, a team of loyal undercover cops led by Rambo Krishna (K Gopalakrishnan), leave Palar base of STF, near M. M. Hills, 100 kilometres (62 mi) from Kollegal of Karnataka along with a team of 41 members which includes police from two states, forest officials, forest watchers and informers. The team travels in two vehicles, of which one is a bus carrying most of the team members, and a jeep carrying K.Goplakrishnan, the IPS officer. Veerappan gang plants landmines on the road in more than 14 places to halt their approach, and during the Palar blast, K.Gopalakrishnan, standing on the foot board of the jeep is thrown out, and suffers severe injuries, leaving the police to retaliate and ultimately prevent the snatching of arms.

After few failed attempts, including the one led by another undercover cop (Gundragovi Satya), disguised as a subordinate to Muslim underworld Don-Kadaani (Ramesh Pandit), to negotiate an arms deal with Veerappan's gang, the STF team led by master-strategist, and an ex-spy turned timberyard owner-Kumar (Srikanth Iyyengar), finally succeed on 18 October 2004. On that day, Veerappan is escorted out of the forest by Kumar who earlier infiltrates Veerappan's gang in disguise to negotiate another arms deal with Velupillai Prabhakaran. Subsequently, Veerappan and his men board an ambulance stationed at Papparapatti village in Dharmapuri district, Veerappan and his men are first warned and then asked to surrender, which they refuse, and the men start firing at the STF personnel. The STF retaliate by firing grenades and gun fire, subsequently Veerappan and his men are killed on the spot.

== Cast ==
- Shiva Rajkumar as an unnamed STF master-strategist, touted to be based on N. K. Senthamarai Kannan, the head of intelligence wing in the Operation Cocoon.
- Sandeep Bharadwaj as Veerappan, the forest brigand
- Rahaao as Gandhi, chief intel of Veerappan's team
- Yagna Shetty as Muthulakshmi, Veerappan's wife
- K.S.Sridhar as K Vijay Kumar, Chief of Tamil Nadu STF during Operation Cocoon
- Gadda Viji as Pandillapalli Srinivas, IFS Officer who was killed by Veerappan
- Sanchari Vijay as STF Rookie Officer Gopal
- Rajesh Nataranga as SI Shakeel Ahmed
- Aziz Naser as STF Officer Shashi who is a secret informer to Gandhi
- Parul Yadav as Shreya, STF spy / informer and landlord who rents out house to Muttulakshmi
- Rockline Venkatesh as T Harikrishna, SP of Kolar/Mysore, who was killed by Veerappan
- Srikanth Iyyengar as Kumar, ex-spy turned timberyard owner
- Ramesh Pandit as Kadhani, an underworld don
- Gundragovi Sathya as undercover cop Anees who goes to Veerappan in the disguise of a subordinate of the underworld don Kadhani for settling the arms deal
- 'Satish' Adla Satish Kumar as Sethukali Govindan, a close aid of Veerappan from his childhood till death

== Production ==
Killing Veerappan is Ram Gopal Varma's second docudrama since the release of The Attacks of 26/11. Killing Veerappan is produced by B. V. Manjunath, B. S. Sudhindra, E. Shivaprakash, and Ram Gopal Varma under the production house of ZED3 Pictures & G.R. Pictures. The film's music was composed by Ravi Shankar, Rajasekhar and the Background score was done by Sandy. The dialogues were written by Balaji K and the cinematography was helmed by Rammy.

== Soundtrack ==
Killing Veerappan

Soundtrack album by Ravi Shankar, Rajashekar, Munna Kasi, Sathya Kashyap and Sandy
- Recorded: 2015
- Genre: Feature film soundtrack
- Length: 30:50
- Language: Kannada
- Label: Lahari Music

Ravishankar scored the film's background music and co-composed for the soundtrack along with Rajasekhar, Munna Kasi, Sathya Kashyap and Sandy. Lyrics for the soundtrack was penned by Chethan Kumar and Srujan. The soundtrack album consists of nine tracks including three instrumentals. It was released on 3 November 2015 in Bangalore.

Kannada track list
No.	Title	Lyrics	Music	Singer(s)	Length
1.	"Hayya Hayya (The Power of Shiva)"	Chethan Kumar	Ravishankar	Shiva Rajkumar	4:49
2.	"Vadhayo Vadhayo"	Srujan	Rajashekar	Rajashekar	1:33
3.	"Spot Spot"	Chethan Kumar	Munna Kasi	Puneeth Rajkumar	3:09
4.	"Hayya Hayya (Women Power)"	Chethan Kumar	Ravishankar	Indu Nagaraj	4:42
5.	"Rakthava Kudiyo"	Chethan Kumar	Ravishankar	Geetha Madhuri	2:34
6.	"Elephant Scream"		Rajashekar	Instrumental	1:34
7.	"Kill Beat"		Ravishankar	Instrumental	2:03
8.	"Hayya Hayya (Veerappan Mix)"	Chethan Kumar	Sathya Kashyap	Shiva Rajkumar	5:17
9.	"Love You Veera"		Sandy	Instrumental	5:09
Total length:					30:50

== Reception ==
Deccan Chronicle praised Shiva Rajkumar's performance, noting, "Forget Veerappan, watch it for Shivanna." The New Indian Express wrote, "Shiva Rajkumar as a cop is scarier than Veerappan".
