= N. K. Senthamarai Kannan =

Police commissioner in India

N. K. Senthamarai Kannan IPS
- Born: Tamil Nadu, India
- Education: Madurai Kamaraj University
- Police career
- Country: India
- Department: Indian Police Service
- Service years: 1989-present

N. K. Senthamarai Kannan is a Police Commissioner, and former Inspector General of Police in the Indian Police Service. He is the first Tiruppur city police commissioner. He has also served as a Special Task Force spy who headed the intelligence wing in the Operation Cocoon, behind the encounter with the notorious bandit Veerappan under the leadership of K. Vijay Kumar. The 2016 film Killing Veerappan is based on the operation carried out by him. Kannan is a 1997-batch Indian Police Service (IPS) officer, who entered the State police service as a Deputy Superintendent of Police in 1989, and was later conferred IPS in 2003 with six years’ retrospective effect. He studied Economics in The American College, Madurai and later became Asst Professor in Economics in the same college from 1985, worked there till he entered Tamil Nadu State Police service in 1989.
