= List of organisations banned in India =

The Ministry of Home Affairs of India has banned a number of organisations that have been proscribed as terrorist organisations under the Unlawful Activities (Prevention) Act.

== The list ==
As of March 2023, this is the list of banned terrorist groups in India. The official list often includes longer descriptions, such as "and all its manifestations", which are omitted here.

Date Added	Logo	Name
1990	United Liberation Front of Asom	United Liberation Front of Assam (ULFA)
May 1992		Liberation Tigers of Tamil Eelam (LTTE)
April 1997		All Tripura Tiger Force (ATTF)
April 1997		National Liberation Front of Tripura (NLFT)
27 April 2000		Deendar Anjuman
22 March 2002		International Sikh Youth Federation
1 April 2002		Al-Badr
July 2002		Akhil Bharat Nepali Ekta Samaj (ABNES)
2 July 2002		Tamil Nadu Liberation Army (TNLA)
2 July 2002		Tamil National Retrieval Troops (TNRT)
2 July 2002	Jihad	Al-Qaeda / al-Qaeda in the Indian Subcontinent
2 July 2002		Babbar Khalsa International
December 2004		Communist Party of India (Marxist–Leninist) People's War
29 December 2004		Harkat-ul-Jihad al-Islami / Ansar-Ul-Ummah
6 August 2008		Students Islamic Movement of India (SIMI)
22 June 2009		Communist Party of India (Maoist) / Maoist Communist Centre (MCC)
4 June 2010		Indian Mujahideen
12 January 2012		Garo National Liberation Army (GNLA)
28 December 2013		Kamtapur Liberation Organisation
16 December 2014		Islamic State of Iraq and the Levant
2015		National Democratic Front of Bodoland (NDFB) in Assam
16 September 2015		National Socialist Council of Nagaland (Khaplang)
27 April 2018		Dukhtaran-e-Millat (DEM)
13 December 2018		Manipur People's Liberation Front (MPLF)
26 December 2018		Khalistan Liberation Force
23 May 2019		Jamiat-ul-Mujahideen / Jamaat-ul-Mujahideen Bangladesh
30 December 2019		Jammu and Kashmir Islamic Front
February 2023		Khalistan Tiger Force (KTF)
17 February 2023		Jammu and Kashmir Ghaznavi Force (JKGF)
March 2023		Al-Umar-Mujahideen
March 2023		Harkat-ul-Mujahideen / Harkat ul-Ansar / Jamiat ul-Ansar
March 2023		Hizbul Mujahideen / Hizbul Mujahideen Pir Panjal Regiment
March 2023		Jaish-e-Mohammed / Tahrik-e-Furqan / People's Anti-Fascist Front (PAFF)
March 2023		Kangleipak Communist Party (KCP)
10 October 2023		Hizb ut-Tahrir
10 October 2023		Kanglei Yaol Kanba Lup (KYKL)
10 October 2023		Khalistan Commando Force
10 October 2023		Khalistan Zindabad Force
10 October 2023		Lashkar-e-Taiba / Pasban-e-Ahle Hadis / The Resistance Front
10 October 2023		Organisations listed in the Schedule to the U.N. Prevention and Suppression of Terrorism (Implementation of Security Council Resolutions) Order, 2007 made under section 2 of the United Nations (Security Council) Act, 1947 and amended from time to time
13 November 2023		People's Liberation Army (PLA)
13 November 2023		People's Revolutionary Party of Kangleipak (PREPAK)
13 November 2023		Tehreek-ul-Mujahideen (TuM)
13 November 2023		United National Liberation Front (UNLF)

== See also ==
- List of designated terrorist groups
- List of terrorist incidents in India
- Terrorism in India
