= Senthamarai =

Senthamarai (lit. 'Red Lotus' in Tamil) may refer to:

- Senthamarai (actor), an Indian stage and film actor
- Senthamarai (film), a 1962 Indian film by A. Bhimsingh
- N. K. Senthamarai Kannan, an Indian police commissioner
- Thamilar Senthamarai, a weekly newspaper
