= Operation Cocoon =

Tamil Nadu Police operation to capture Veerappan

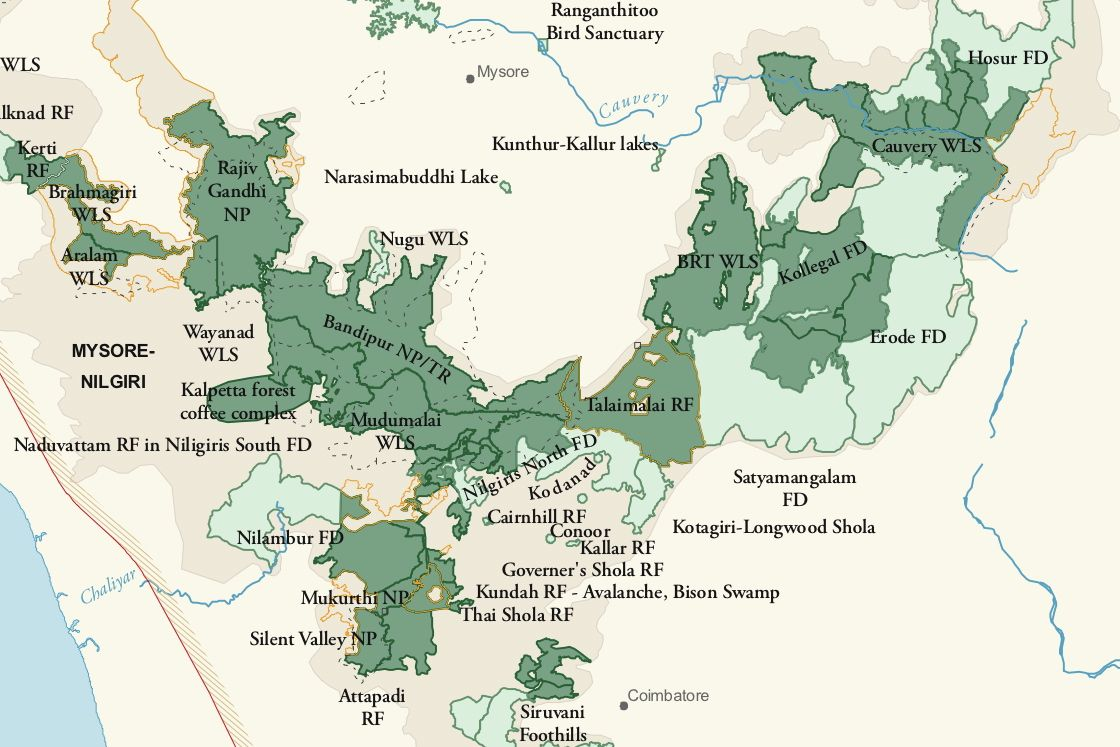
Map of the Nilgiri Biosphere Reserve, the core area of Veerappan's operations

Operation Cocoon was a police operation conducted in 2004 by the Special Task Force of the Tamil Nadu Police to capture the bandit Veerappan and his associates, who were dominant in Sathyamangalam forests in the border region of the South Indian states of Tamil Nadu, Karnataka and Kerala. Veerappan was wanted for the illegal poaching of Indian elephants, and smuggling of ivory and sandalwood. He had also murdered at least 184 people, most of whom were government officials, and police officers, and evaded arrest for almost two decades. The operation was executed in October 2004 and headed by K. Vijay Kumar, and N. K. Senthamarai Kannan. It ended after Veerappan and three of his associates were shot dead on 18 October 2004.

== Background ==
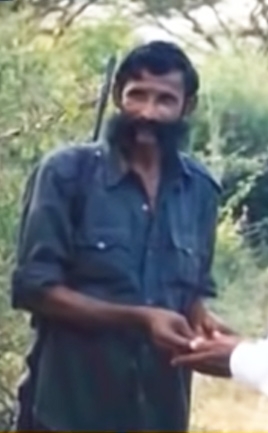
Veerappan in 2000

Veerappan (18 January 1952 – 18 October 2004), was an Indian bandit, who was active in the forested area covering about 6,000 km^{2} (2,300 sq mi) along the borders of the states of Tamil Nadu, Karnataka and Kerala. He started engaging in criminal activities in the 1970s, and was briefly arrested in 1986. He was wanted for poaching of more than 500 Indian elephants for ivory and illegal logging and trafficking of more than 10,000 tonnes of sandalwood.

In the late 1980s, he started murdering forest officials, who were intervening with this operations. In the 1990s, special task forces was constituted by the governments of Tamil Nadu and Karnataka to try and capture him. Though it initially curbed his activities, he continued to indulge in illegal activities and had the support of the tribal people living in the periphery of the forests.

In the late 1990s, Veerappan started kidnapping government officials for ransom. He also killed police personnel and tribal people, whom he felt, were against his activities. He kidnapped Kannada film actor Rajkumar in 2000, who was released after a ransom was paid. He later kidnapped Nagapppa, a retired minister of Karnataka, who was later found dead. He killed at least 184 people, more than half of which were police officers. He had confessed to some of the murders during an interview with Nakkeeran editor R. Gopal For over two decades, Veerappan defied the government, and maintained a small army, which at one point numbered hundreds. A reward of ₹50 million (US$520,000) was offered for Veerappan's capture, yet he evaded arrest.

== Operation ==
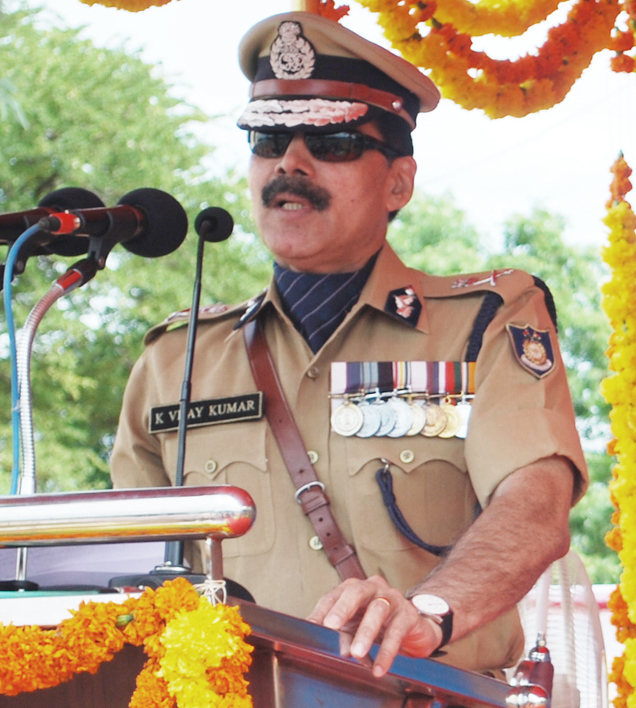
K. Vijay Kumar, who led the operation

In 1991, the joint Special Task Force (STF) was instituted by the state governments of Tamil Nadu and Karnataka, to capture Veerappan and his associates. The search extended for more than a decade and cost more than ₹1 billion (US$10 million). In 2004, the Tamil Nadu special forces launched Operation Cocoon in the Sathyamangalam forests, which was headed by K. Vijay Kumar and N. K. Senthamarai Kannan.

With the assistance of the local people, undercover police officers infiltrated Veerappan's camp. Due to Veerappan's extensive knowledge of the forest terrain, they planned to bring him out of the forest. According to the police summary, the operation required ten months of planning. The execution required three weeks, and the final operation lasted only 45 minutes. The STF personnel infiltrated the local people in the villages in the region where Veerappan was supposedly loitering. Through the years, due to aging and death, his group was reduced to four men. Veerapan was himself suffering from health ailments and was planning to travel to South Arcot to receive medical treatment for his eye and needed to leave the forest.

Operation Cocoon

"We have searched and hunted for Veerappan for the last 20 years. But his end was all over in 20 minutes. We wish we could catch him alive and bring him to justice. But we are happy that our efforts have finally succeeded"

— ~ K. Vijay Kumar, Head of Special Task Force, India's most wanted, Veerappan shot dead, 20 October 2004

On 18 October 2004, Veerappan and his accomplices were escorted out of the forest to an ambulance stationed at Papparapatti in Dharmapuri district. It was a police vehicle disguised as an ambulance, and he was accompanied by a police officer, who had infiltrated Veerappan's gang. At 10 pm IST, Veerappan was spotted by Sub-Inspector Velladurai, who was on surveillance duty, and he alerted the police control room. At 10:15 pm, the ambulance driver stopped the vehicle citing mechanical issues, as planned earlier by the police. The police surrounded the vehicle and asked Veerappan to surrender. Veerappan and three of his associates were killed in the operation.

Instead, Veerappan and his men opened fire on the police forces at 10.50 pm. The STF returned fire from a distance of about 15 ft (4.6 m), and the exchange of fire lasted for about 20 minutes. Veerappan was shot three times, with bullet injuries, on his forehead, hip and ribs.

== Aftermath ==
After the operation, the STF recovered a Remington rifle, two AK-47s, a self-loading rifle, two hand grenades and cash worth ₹0.35 million (US$3,600). The police released a photograph of Veerappan's body, and his body was kept in the government hospital at Dharmapuri. Public were not permitted to view his body. As the photograph showed Veerappan sporting a smaller mustache, while his earlier file photographs showed him with a bigger mustache, there were doubts raised by the media with respect to the identity of the body. The police established Veerappan's identity based on his fingerprints and confirmation with his relatives.

The gunshots appeared to have been conducted from close range, and some media outlets claimed that Veerappan could have been captured alive and that he was killed for political reasons. However, post mortem analysis and ballistic reports confirmed the police reports. Some protests were made by human rights activists, who felt that Veerappan was not given a fair chance to justify himself. Veerappan's wife, Muthulakshmi, wanted to bury the body at the premises of the house of Veerappan's brother, while the police preferred a cremation and his body was cremated on 20 October 2004.

The Chief Minister of Tamil Nadu announced a cash reward of ₹0.3 million (equivalent to ₹1.1 million or US$11,000 in 2023), a plot of land, and job promotions to all the 752 members of the STF team involved in the operation. Vijaya Kumar was awarded the President's Police Medal for Gallantry on the 58th Independence Day in 2005 for his role in leading the operations.

== Popular culture ==
In 2010, Jungle Lodges and Resorts, a Karnataka government undertaking, launched a jungle trek and camp covering the regions where Veerappan once lived.

In 2016, Vijay Kumar announced that he was writing a book penning down his first hand account of the operation. He said that he would not reveal any names in the book, but rather would focus on incidents that had led to the killing of Veerappan.

Santhanakadu, a 125 episode Tamil tele-serial was telecast on Makkal TV in 2007. Kannada films Attahasa (2012) and Killing Veerappan (2016), and a Hindi film Veerappan were based on the incident. The Hunt for Veerappan was a docuseries about the operation that was streamed on Netflix in August 2023.
