= K. Vijay Kumar =

Indian police officer

K Vijay Kumar
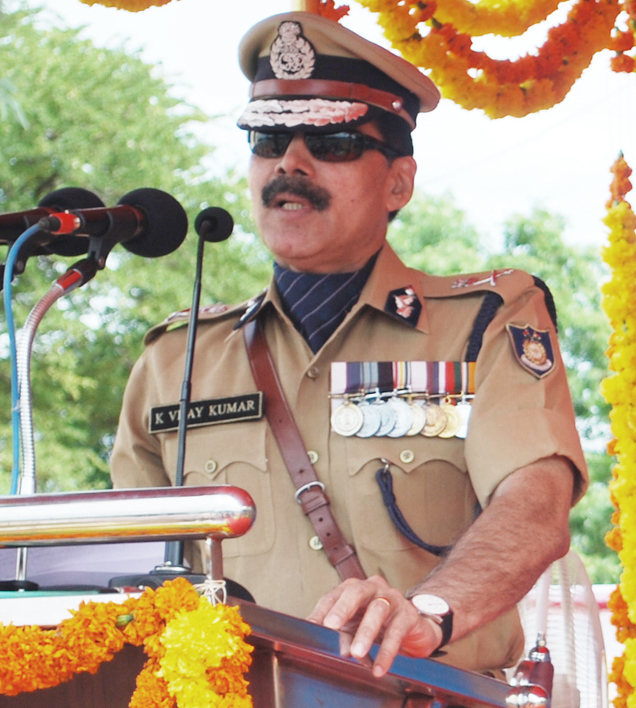
- Born: Krishnan Vijay Kumar; 15 September 1952 (age 74)
- Education: Madras Christian College
- Police career
- Country: India
- Department: Indian Police Service
- Service years: 1975 - 2012
- Status: Retired
- Rank: Director General of Police
- Awards: Padma Shri (2026); President's Police Medal for Gallantry; President's Police Medal for Distinguished Service; Police Medal for Meritorious Service; Counter Insurgency Medal; Jammu & Kashmir Medal
- Other work: Senior Security Adviser in Ministry of Home Affairs (India); Adviser to Governor of Jammu and Kashmir

K Vijay Kumar PMG GM IPS (born 15 September 1952), is a retired IPS officer. He was the chief of the Special Task Force of Tamil Nadu that was involved in the death of the Veerappan during Operation Cocoon of 2004. He had also been the senior advisor to Home Ministry for the Left Wing Extremism areas. He served as the Advisor to the Governor of Jammu and Kashmir with Home, Forest, Ecology & Environment, Health & Medical Education, Youth Services & Sports, Hospitality & Protocol, Civil Aviation, Estates and Information portfolios. Currently he has joined back as senior security adviser in Ministry of Home Affairs in December 2018.

== Early life ==
Vijay Kumar was raised in Tamil Nadu alongside six siblings. He holds a Bachelor of Law (BL) and a Master of Law (ML) from the University of Madras, as well as a Master of Business Administration (MBA) from the Indira Gandhi National Open University (IGNOU). In 2010, he also obtained a Master's degree in Business Law from the National Law School of India University, Bangalore.

== Career ==
Vijay Kumar joined the Indian Police Service on 10 November 1975. He served as Assistant superintendent in Pattukkottai, Trichy and Sembiam. As Superintendent of Police, he served in Dharmapuri from 1982 to 1983 and Salem from 1983 to 1985. He assisted Walter Devaram during this tenure. He served from 1985 to 1990 in the Elite Special Protection Group (SPG) with former Prime Minister Rajiv Gandhi. In 1990, he was posted as the SP of Dindigul district followed by Vellore district in 1991. In 1991 he along with Sanjay Arora went on to form the Special Security Group (SSG) to provide security to Former Chief Minister J. Jayalalithaa. In 1997 he was posted as the first Inspector General of Police for the South Zone of Tamil Nadu after having handled the caste clashes in the southern districts. He served from 1998 to 2000 as the Inspector General, Border Security Force (BSF) Srinagar during the peak of militancy. He also served as IG (Operations), BSF before being recalled to the state to head the operations to hunt the forest brigand Veerappan. In December 2001, he was appointed Commissioner of Police for Chennai city. The highlight of his career came was when he headed the task force operation, Operation Cocoon in which Veerappan was killed in October 2004.

In 2008, Vijay Kumar was chosen to head the Sardar Vallabhbhai Patel National Police Academy in Hyderabad. He served as the Director-general of Central Reserve Police Force (CRPF) from 2010 to 2012. In December 2012, the Union government appointed him as Senior Security Adviser in Ministry of Home Affairs in Government of India.

In June 2018, Vijay Kumar was appointed as adviser to Governor Vohra, along with Chhattisgarh cadre IAS officer BVR Subrahmanyam. The names of advisers were cleared by the Ministry of Home Affairs in Government of India after the state was put under the Governor's rule. In December 2019, he was appointed as senior security adviser in the Ministry of Home Affairs.

== Awards and recognitions ==
During his 37 years of service he has been awarded with Jammu & Kashmir Medal, Counter Insurgency Medal, Police Medal for Meritorious Service in 1993, President's Police Medal for Distinguished Service in 1999 and President's Police Medal for Gallantry on 58th Independence Day in 2005 (for his role in catching Veerappan). He was awarded the Padma Shri award in January 2026, which is the 4th highest civilian award.

== Book ==
His book Veerappan: Chasing the Brigand (ISBN 978-81-291-4530-7) gives an account of the rise and fall of Veerappan. The last section details about the Operation Cocoon.
