= Gopinatham =

- Location within Karnataka Location within India
- Coordinates: 12°3′N 77°42′E
- Country: India
- State: Karnataka
- District: Chamrajnagar District

Gopinatham is a rural village located in Chamarajanagar district, Karnataka, India, in the border area of Tamil Nadu. It is the birthplace of Veerappan. The village is 146 kilometres (91 mi) from the district centre at Chamarajanagar among thick scrub forest and mountainous terrain.

== Eco-tourism ==
The village is now a small-time tourist attraction and trekking is encouraged on a 12 kilometres (7.5 mi) trail. A trekking camp, managed by Government agencies, is located in the forests of Cauvery Wildlife Sanctuary, near the village. The Hogenakal falls is 12 kilometres (7.5 mi) from Gopinatha and cycles are provided in the trekking camp to reach the waterfalls. Trekking is also arranged to Yekehalla, where a small memorial is built by Forest Department of Karnataka State, to remember DCF P. Srinivas, who was beheaded by Veerappan, when the officer was lured to the spot on the pretext of surrender proposed by the brigand through his brother Arjun. Srinivas was attacked from behind when he was crossing a stream.
