= Tamil National Retrieval Troops =

1980s nationalist militant group

Tamil Nadu National Retrieval Troops (TNNRT) was a short lived Tamil nationalist militant group who had fought to gain independence from India in the 1980s. The group wanted to unite a greater Tamil Nadu nation for their people. Tamil Nadu National Retrieval Troops fought the majority of their conflicts in the 1990s. This organization was considered to be part of a larger nationalist Tamil Nadu movement. However, the Tamil Nadu Retrieval Troops were never that large; their membership often hovered around 30. The young men fighting in the Tamil National Retrieval Troops were mostly from the Vanniyar community. The Tamil Nadu National Retrieval Troops are also known as Tamil Nadu Nadu Retrieval Troops* - this is not another branch but rather another name used by the group.

== History ==
The group was also interested in creating their own area in Tamil Nadu. The group was founded by P. Ravichandran in the late 1980s. After the assassination of Rajiv Gandhi, support for Tamil liberation groups decreased steadily. This remained true for years before new Tamil pro-liberation movements emerged. This was quickly shut down by the then Chief Minister Jayalalithaa. This eventually led to the banning of the TNRT. In the 1990s its leader Ravichandran was an accused of the murder of Eelam People's Revolutionary Liberation Front (EPRLF) general secretary and the 1991 Assassination of Rajiv Gandhi.

== Major events ==
On July 2, 2002, The Tamil National Retrieval Troops (TNRT) were included in the Prevention of Terrorist Act (POTA), 2002. The group is officially considered a terrorist organization by the Indian government.

The Tamil National Retrieval Troops aided Veerappan in the kidnapping of Rajkumar. The TNRT, along with the Tamil Nadu Liberation Army and Veerappan requested that numerous political demands must be met in order for the hostage to be released. The group held Rajkumar for 108 days before finally letting him go unharmed.

== Linkage ==
Veerappan- Was a coconspirator in the kidnapping of Rajkumar.

Liberation Tigers of Tamil Eelam (LTTE) - a group supported by the Tamil National Retrieval troop that was based in Sri Lanka. The Liberation Tigers of Tamil Eelam established the National retrieval troop as a small militant group. According to Ravichandran, members of the Tamil National Retrieval Troops were instructed by the Liberation Tigers of Tamil Eelam to annihilate anyone who opposes their objective for a separate nation for the Tamils. The Tamil Tigers provided training and supplies for the Tamil National retrieval movement in Sri Lanka before sending them into India.

Tamil National Liberation Army- Some members possibly belonged to this group as well due to the fact that factions were constantly broken up and disbanded so the soldiers of various Tamil Nadu groups moved from group to group varying based on their beliefs and preferred location. Both groups believe that Tamil Nadu should be free and sovereign, and the land should be set aside for those who reside there.
