= P. Srinivas =

Recipient of the Kirti Chakra award

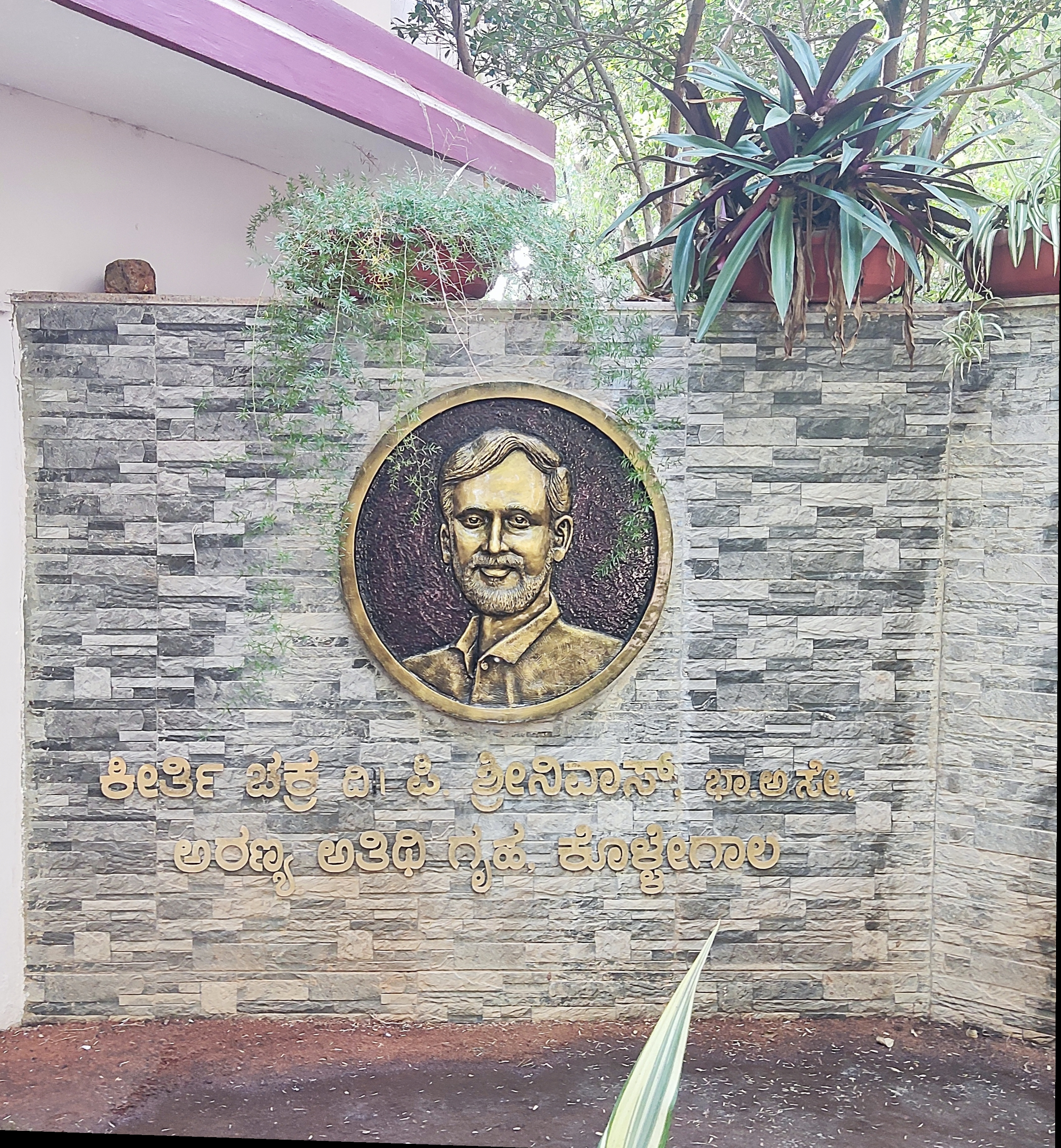
Memorial in Kollegal

Pandillapalli Srinivas (September 12, 1954 – November 10, 1991) was an Indian Forest Service officer (Deputy Conservator of Forests, Karnataka), who was beheaded by Veerappan with whom he had gone to visit, with the hope of getting him to surrender. He was awarded a Kirti Chakra (second in order of precedence of peacetime gallantry awards), for his sacrifice. At the time of his death he served as Assistant Commander of Special Task Force(STF) established to capture Veerappan. Srinivas was a highly successful visionary who helped the villagers of Karnataka, by paving roads and connecting settlements. He provided drinking water channels to tribal regions, and initiated a mobile dispensary unit to assist the poor with medical services. He constructed more than 40 homes for the homeless with his own salary, started afforestation drives, and spread awareness about wildlife and the environment among the villagers. He also rehabilitated and reformed around 120 rebels.

He was murdered in November 1991 by Koose Munisami Veerappan.

In 1992, the President of India conferred the Kirti Chakra posthumously on slain officer, with the award being presented to his mother in recognition of his bravery and service to the nation. Srinivas is remembered for his work as an Indian civil servant and his efforts to improve the living conditions of economically weaker communities. In several villages in Karnataka, he is also venerated as a diety.

== Early life ==
Pandillapalli Srinivas was born in Rajahmundry, East Godavari district of Andhra Pradesh, on 12 September 1954; the first son of Ananta Rao and Jayalaxmi, Srinivas spent most of his childhood in his grandmother's village of Kamarajupeta in Rajahmundry. He completed his primary education in Nagaraju Junior Basis School and Higher Secondary from Lantern High School Rajahmundry. He graduated from Government Arts College in Rajamundry and in 1976 completed his master's in life sciences from Andhra University and secured a gold medal.

== Service ==
In 1979, he qualified for the Indian Forest Service and was assigned to Karnataka Cadre. His first posting (in 1982) was as Assistant Conservator of Forests (ACF) in Chamarajanagar of Mysore district, which was already affected by the activity of Veerappan, who was then a small-time poacher. Srinivas was elevated to the post of Deputy Conservator of Forests (DCF) Chamarajanagar in 1983 and stayed there till 1987.

As ACF, he compiled a directory of all sandalwood smugglers and poachers operating in the area and procured and circulated their photographs. He established and coordinated networks between the police and foresters, drew up strategies to curb the activities of smugglers and poachers and successfully isolated and cornered a large number of them. When the Centre banned the sale of ivory and ivory products, and made the possession of ivory articles, beyond a limit a recognisable offence, the bandit Veerappan switched to sandalwood smuggling.

== Encounter with Veerappan ==
Srinivas was the first and only person to arrest Veerappan in 1986 while the SAARC Summit was in progress at Bengaluru. Veerappan was brought to Budipadaga Forest Rest House in Chamarajanagar Division for interrogation. Based on the information gathered, Srinivas conducted numerous raids on the gang's hideouts in Karnataka, Kerala, and Tamil Nadu.

When Srinivas was out on one of these raids, Veerappan escaped from custody. An enquiry was ordered into this escape and some police officials were indicted. Although Srinivas was not at fault, he felt responsible and this probably explains the tenacity with which Srinivas pursued Veerappan when he could have taken up softer postings elsewhere.

In 1987, Srinivas was transferred as DCF at Chikkamagaluru and within few months of his transfer, Veerappan murdered Mr Chidabaram, Range Forest Officer, Satyamangalam Range. Srinivas assisted the local administration in investigating the case. He developed a network of informers against Veerappan in his native village Gopinatham. Veerappan, however killed the informants and displayed their heads as an example in the village. He also doled out part of his ill-gotten wealth amongst the villagers. His excellent knowledge of the terrain coupled with the silence of the villagers, enabled him to extend his activities.

== Philanthropy ==
At Gopinatham, Veerappan's village, Srinivas built a temple for the Goddess Mariamman, at the cost of ₹ 3 lakhs raised through contributions. A fixed deposit scheme was launched to pay the salaries of the temple workers as well as meet the maintenance costs of the temple. He provided drinking water to remote tribal villages in his jurisdiction; developed roads to inaccessible villages and obtained motor transport connections between these villages and nearby towns. He started a mobile dispensary for the people and even learnt basic medicine to assist in the dispensary. At Chikkamagaluru he planned and built a modern forest complex spread over 50 acres, comprising offices, official residences, a temple and private houses for foresters under a self-financing scheme. He took up an ambitious tribal housing programme where he built 40 houses for the homeless people of Gopinatham village. He used his own salary and borrowed from friends and relatives to finance many of these humanitarian activities. He was an outstanding forest officer committed to his job and the people he served. He raised the forest nurseries successfully in the deep forests by impounding available hill top water. He conducted afforestation drives, improved communication networks and set up high altitude watch towers. He understood that forest development and tribal development are intrinsically related.

== Rehabilitation of criminals ==
Srinivas organised cooperatives to sell the minor forest produce collected by the villagers. He provided livelihood to the villagers by employing them in forest nurseries and other developmental works to discourage them from destroying forest wealth and wildlife. Eligible people were identified and appointed as watchers and guards in the forest department. Veerappan's gang members were also encouraged to use these employment opportunities. As a result of Srinivas efforts, the public support base on which Veerappan thrived was eroded. Srinivas offered the gang members a rehabilitation package including legal justice if they would lay down their arms and cross over. A major breakthrough was achieved in 1990 when many of the hardcore gang members surrendered before Srinivas. Veerappan's gang dwindled from over 40 to 8-10 members. Among those surrendered was Arjuna, the younger brother of Veerappan. When they were jailed, Srinivas personally engaged advocates on their behalf and got them released on bail.

== Last encounter with Veerapan ==
In July 1991, Srinivas's tenure with the STF expired. He stopped getting his salary and the security provided to him was weakened but he stayed on as he felt that Veerappan's surrender was imminent. On 9 November 1991 he received a wireless message at MM Hills that Veerappan was ready to surrender if Srinivas met him unaccompanied and unarmed. Without hesitation Srinivas set out alone the same night. He met Arjuna who had been missing for over a month, at Ponnuswamy Palli (Veerappan's uncle) house, stayed the night and left for the encounter in the morning. The last message received from him said, "We are hoping for the best. God will help us" Instead on 10 November 1991, 37-year-old Srinivas was shot from behind while crossing a creek 6 km from Gopinatham village. Soon after that, Veerappan beheaded Srinivas, took his head with him and burnt the body.

== Legacy ==
Srinivas is worshipped by the residents of Veerappan's native village Gopinatham for his heroism

== Award of Kirti Chakra ==
The State Government announced a reward of ₹ 10 lakh (10,00,000rupees) and recommended him for the Presidential Gallantry Award. He was given a State funeral with gun salute and police honours. On 26 January 1992, Srinivas was posthumously awarded the second highest peace time gallantry award the Kirti Chakra, received by his mother from the President of India at the Defence Investiture Ceremony held at Rashtrapathi Bhavan. For Srinivas, the most fitting tribute came from the fact that grief over his death was most palpable at Gopinatham village where he was seen not a mere government functionary but as a social reformer.

== Popular culture ==
- In 2016, Killing Veerappan was scheduled to be released on 27 May 2016
Karnataka Forest Department remembering P.Srinivas, IFS DCF

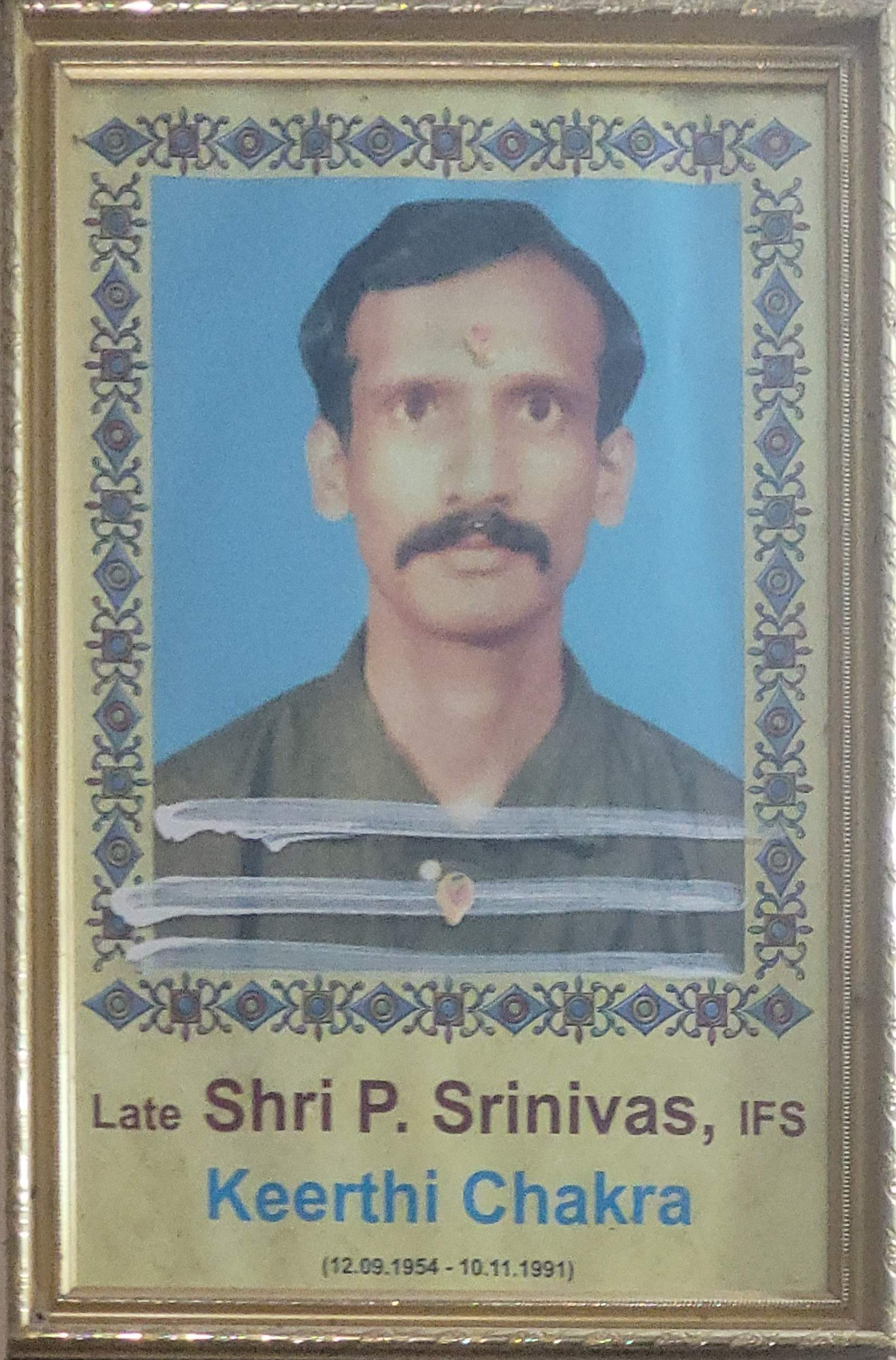
P.Srinivas Photo in Palar Range Forest Officer HQ

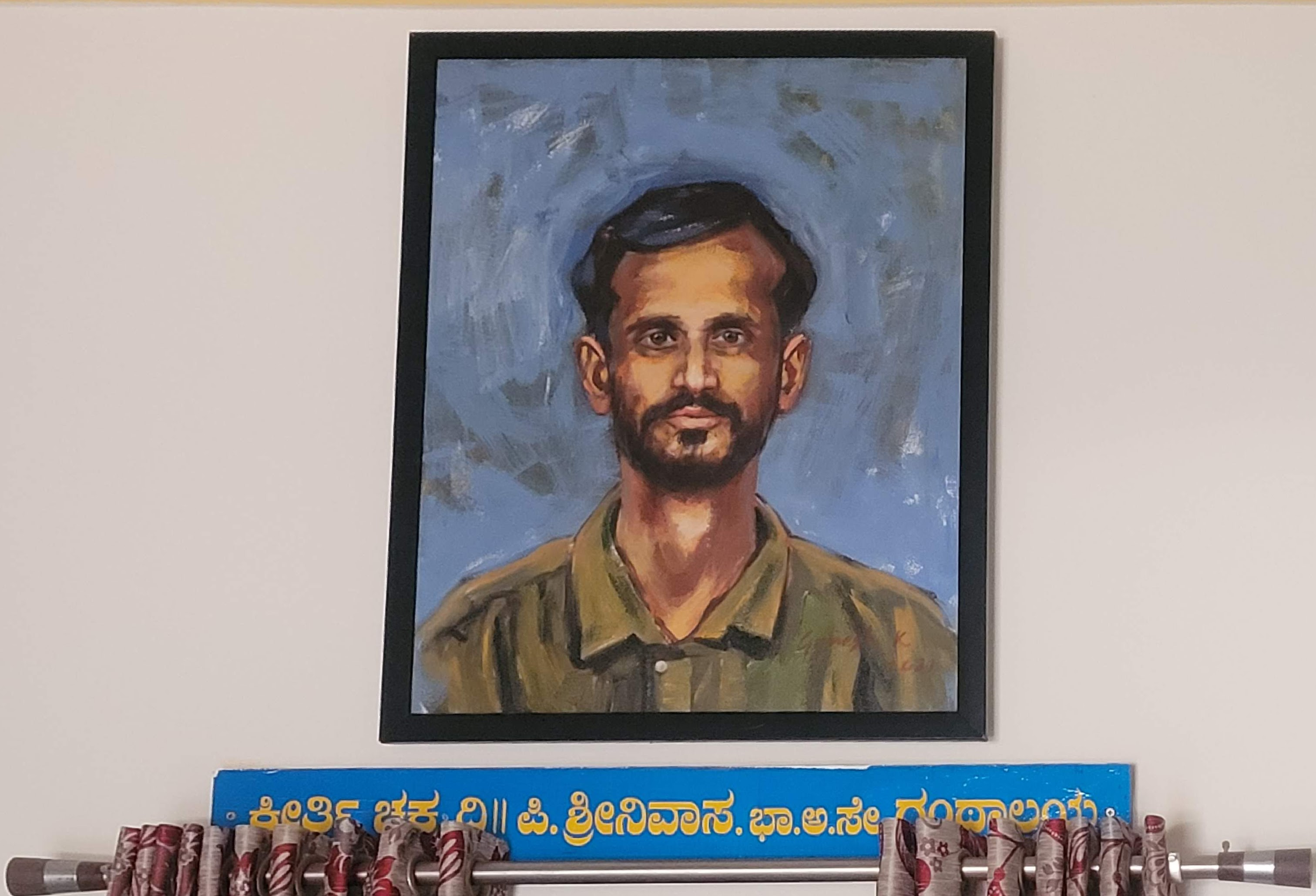
Painted portrait at a library dedicated to P.Srinivas at the Office of Deputy Conservator of Forests, Kollegal, Chamarajanagar District, Karnataka.

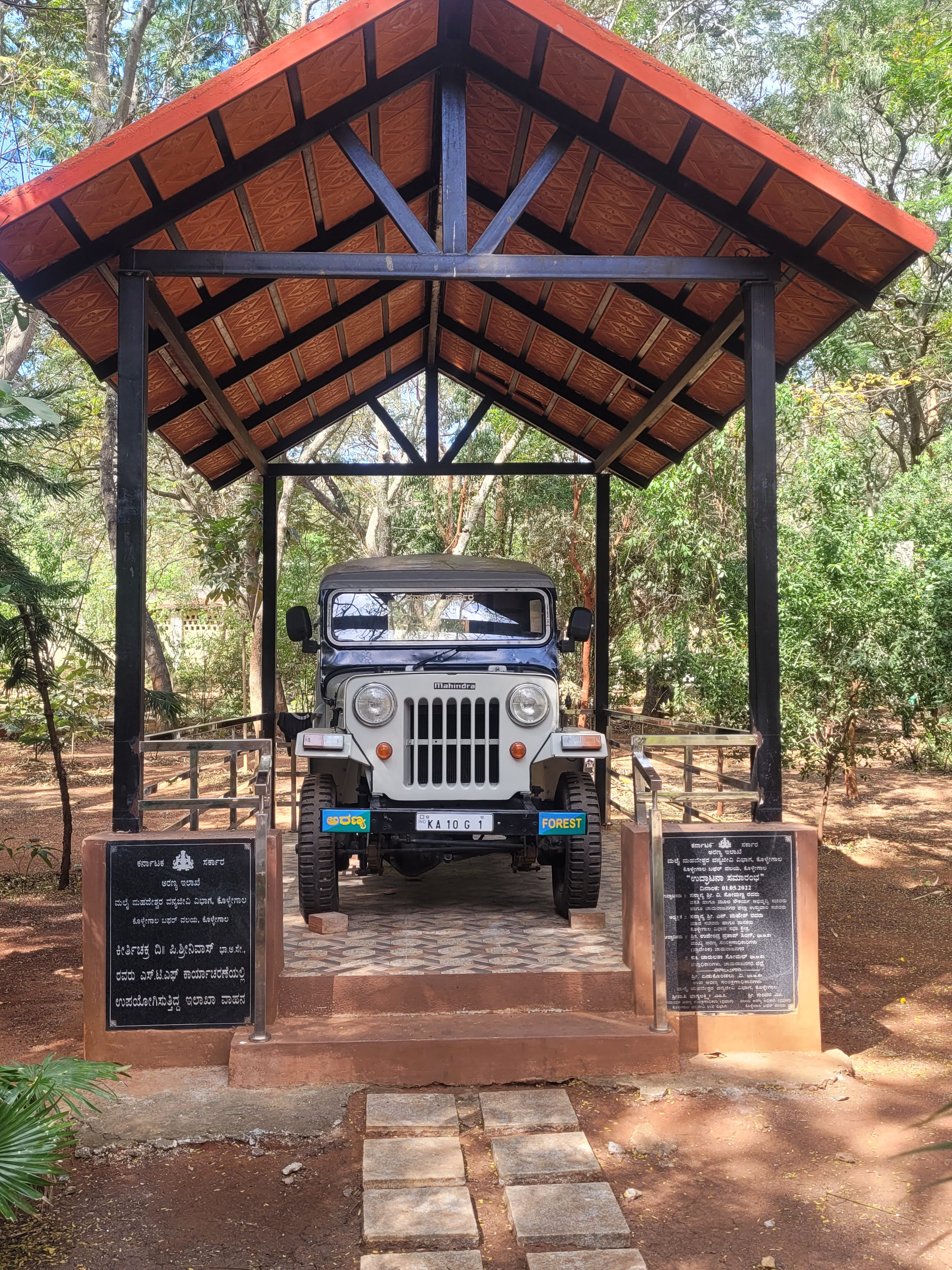
Jeep used by P. Srinivas, IFS put on display as a Memorial to the braveheart's sacrifice on line of duty.

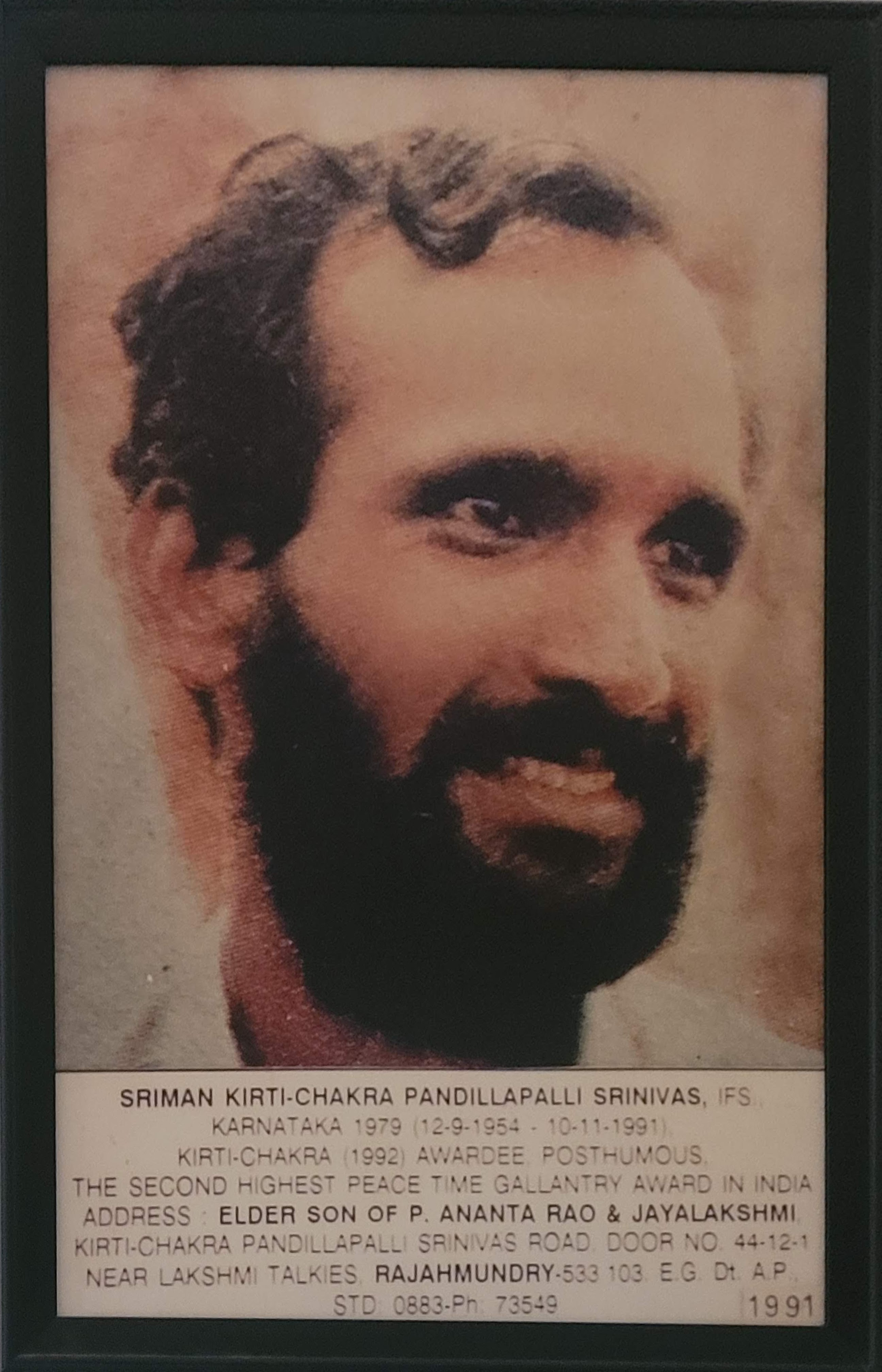
Display in Library dedicated to P.Srinivas at the Office of DCF, Kollegal, Chamarajanagar District, Karnataka.

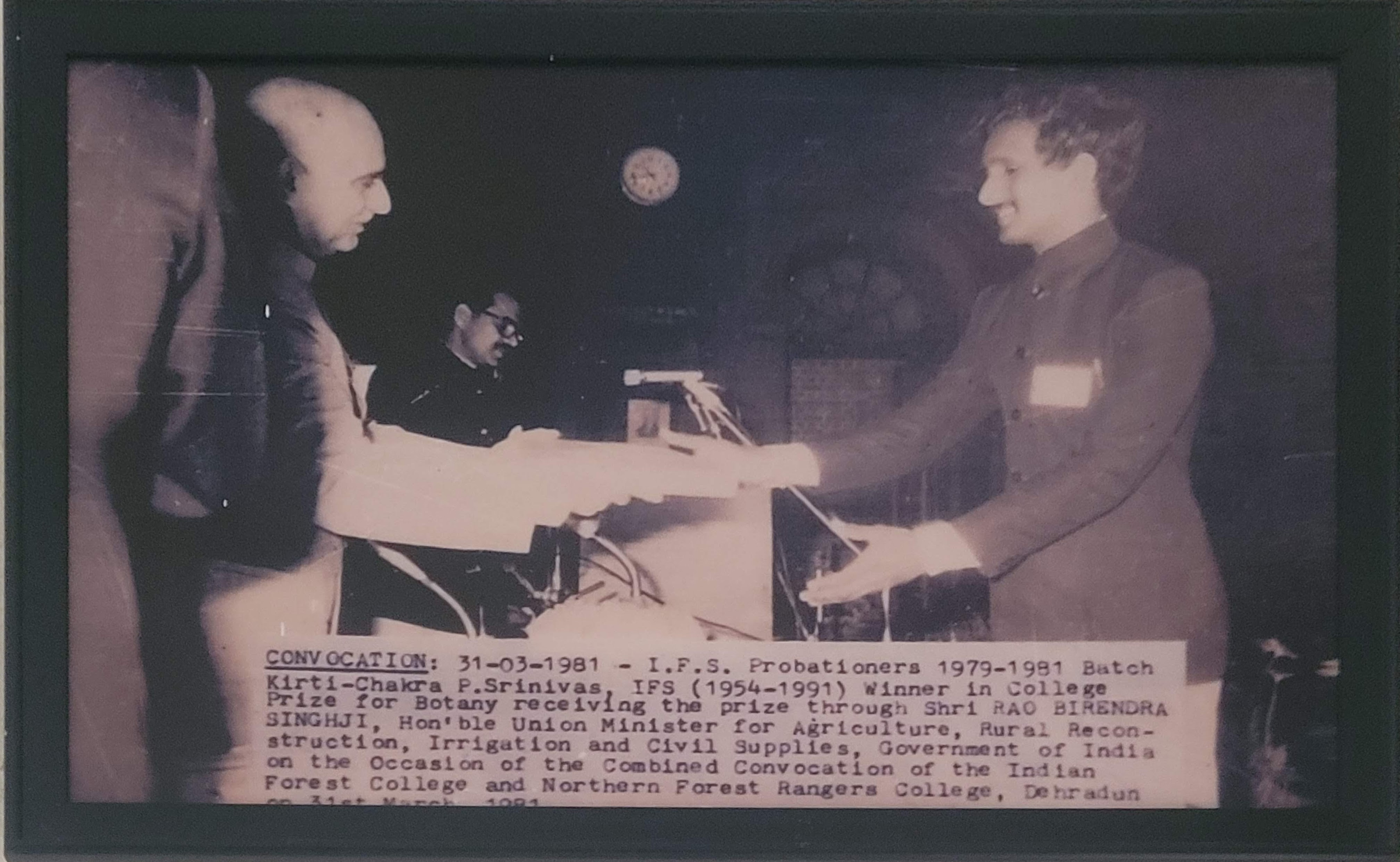
Display in Library dedicated to P.Srinivas at the Office of DCF, Kollegal, Chamarajanagar District, Karnataka.

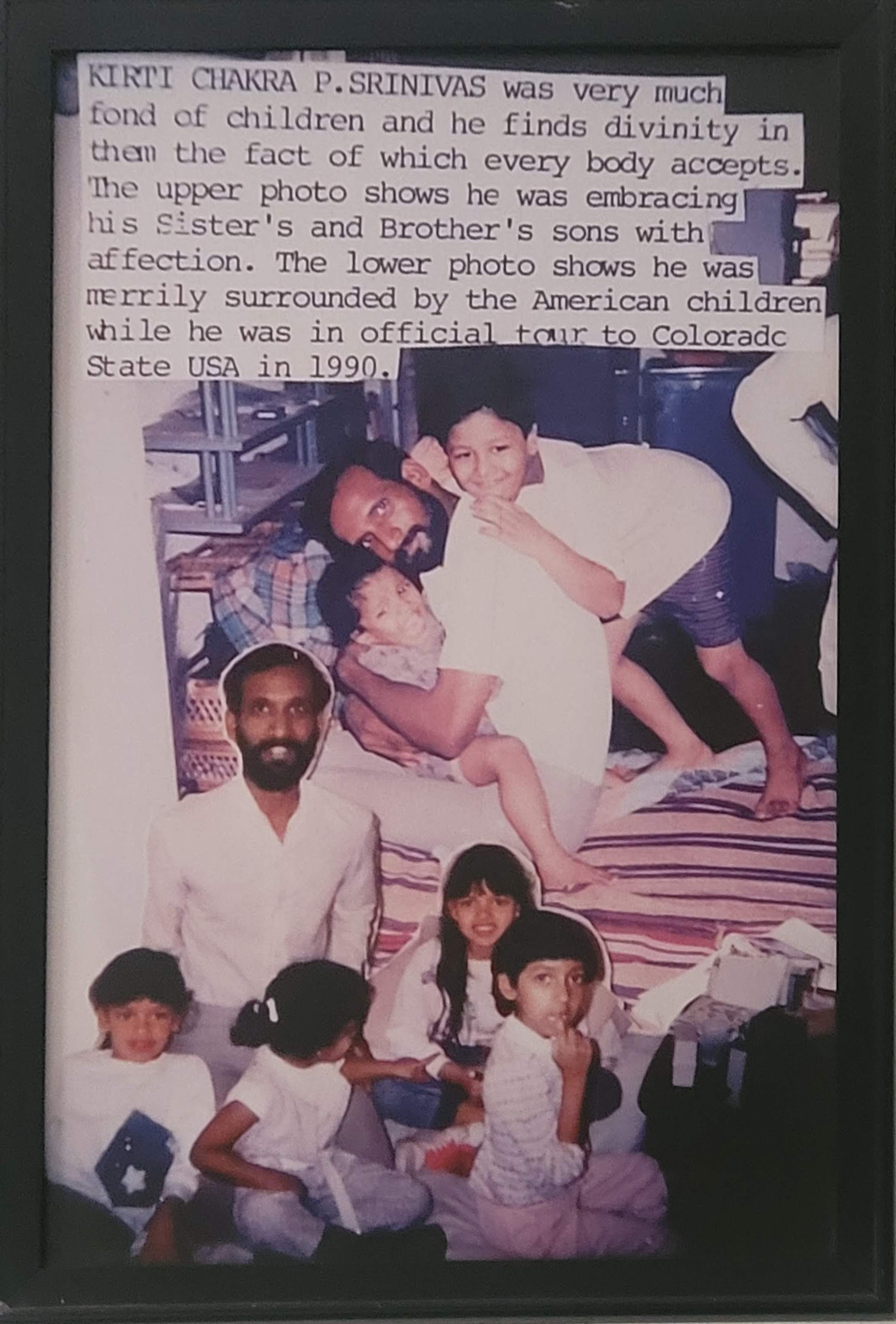
Display in Library dedicated to P.Srinivas at the Office of DCF, Kollegal, Chamarajanagar District, Karnataka.

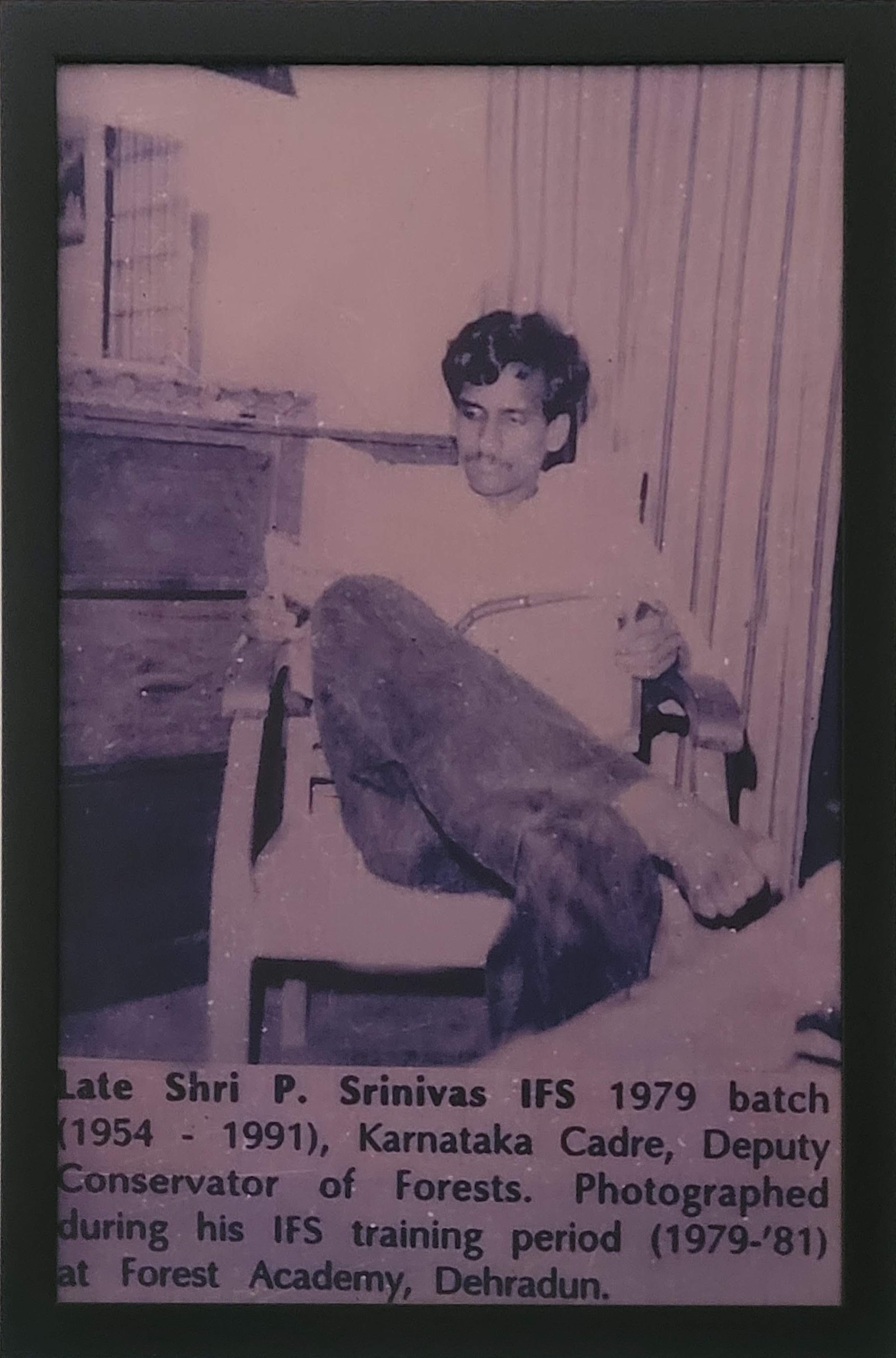
Display in Library dedicated to P.Srinivas at the Office of DCF, Kollegal, Chamarajanagar District, Karnataka.

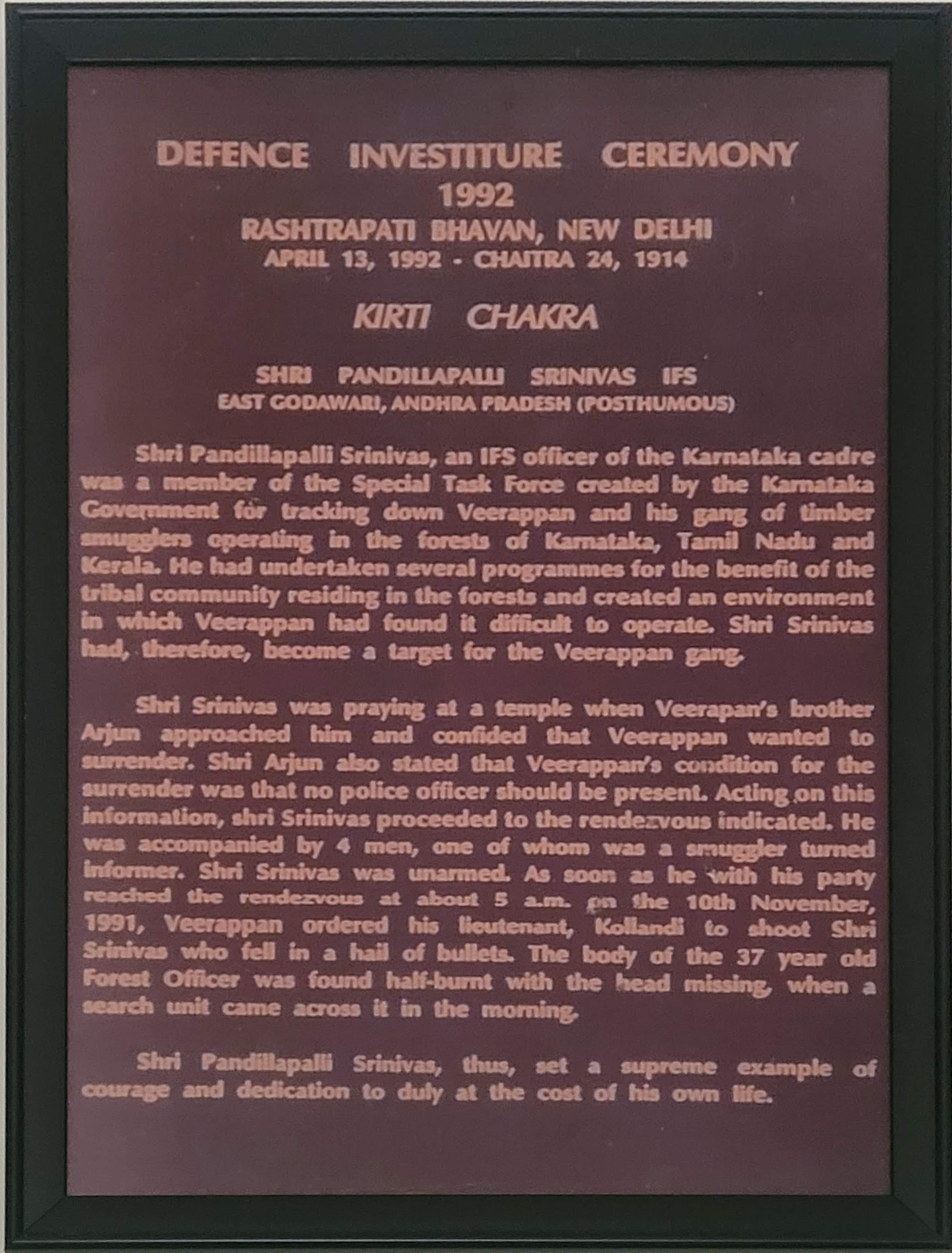
Display in Library dedicated to P.Srinivas at the Office of DCF, Kollegal, Chamarajanagar District, Karnataka.

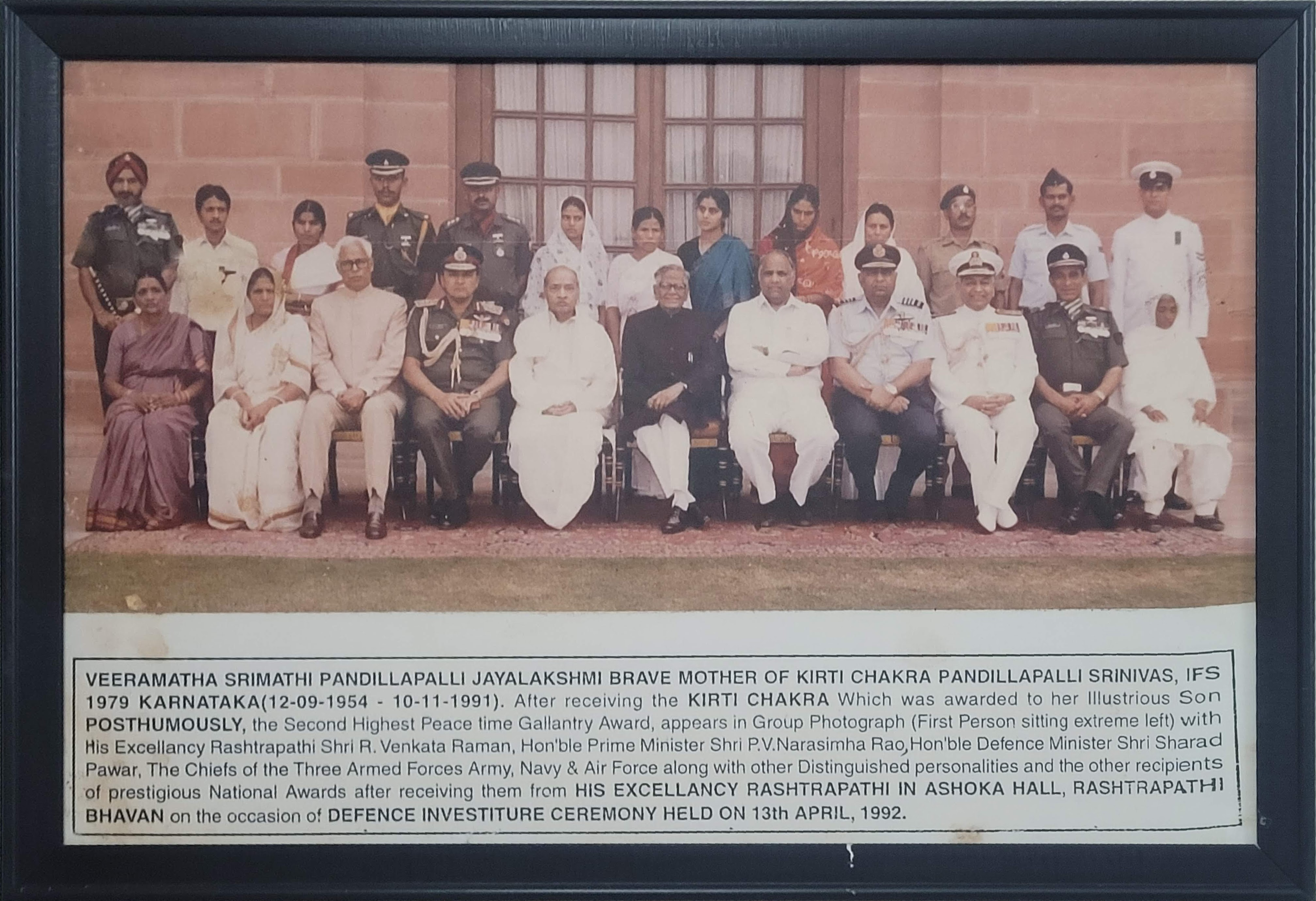
Display in Library dedicated to P.Srinivas at the Office of DCF, Kollegal, Chamarajanagar District, Karnataka.

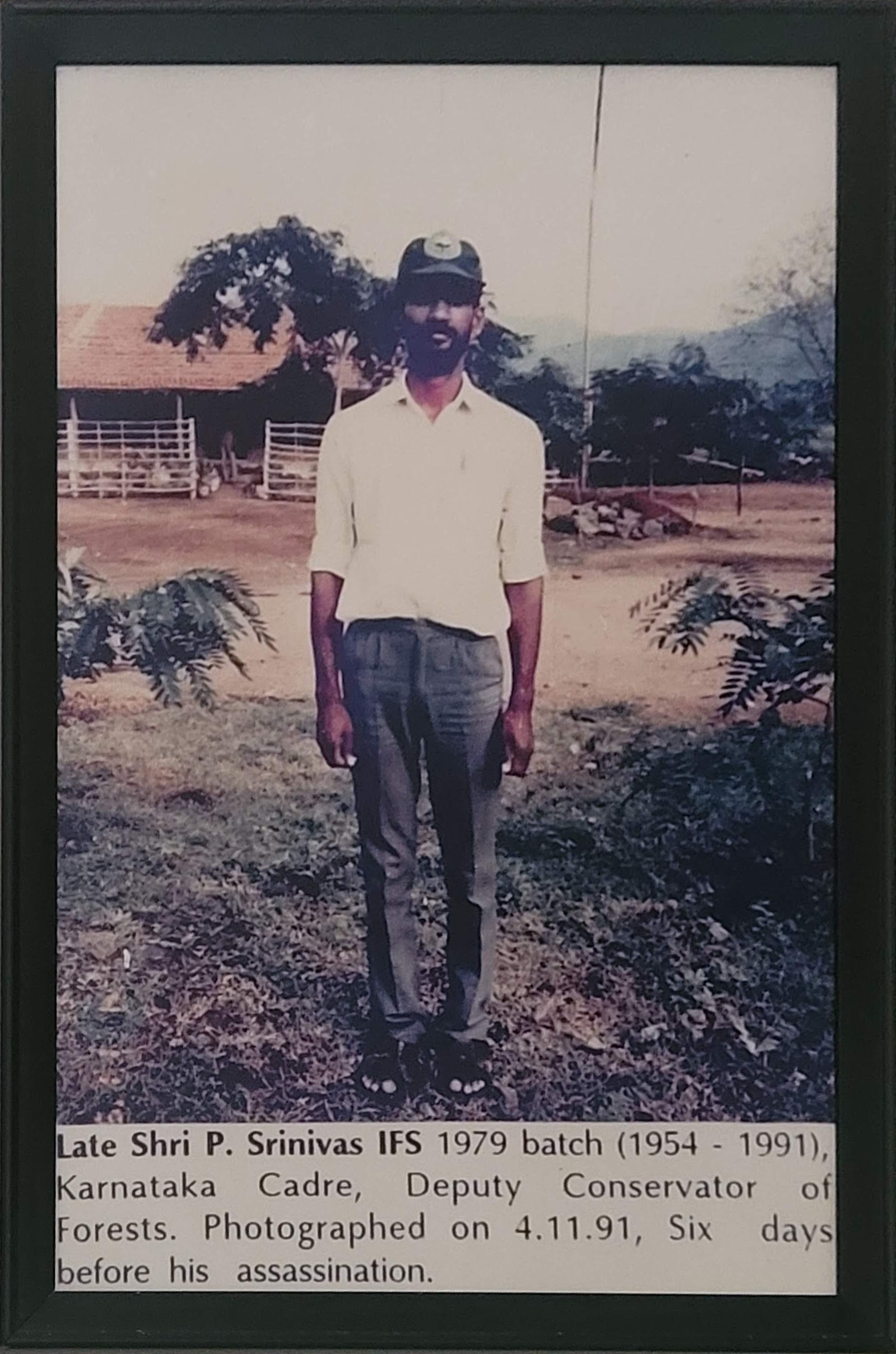
Display in Library dedicated to P.Srinivas at the Office of DCF, Kollegal, Chamarajanagar District, Karnataka.

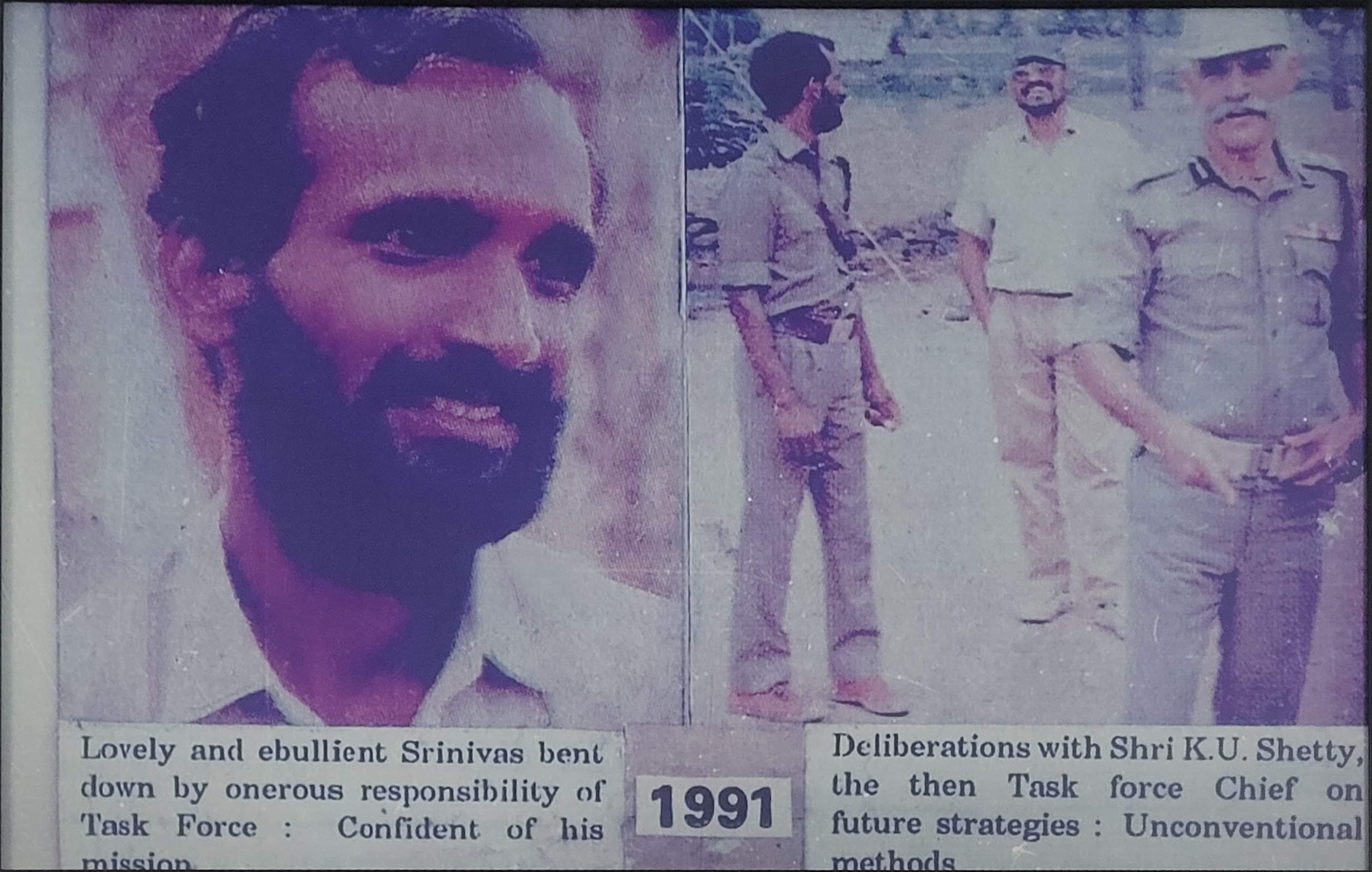
Display in Library dedicated to P.Srinivas at the Office of DCF, Kollegal, Chamarajanagar District, Karnataka.

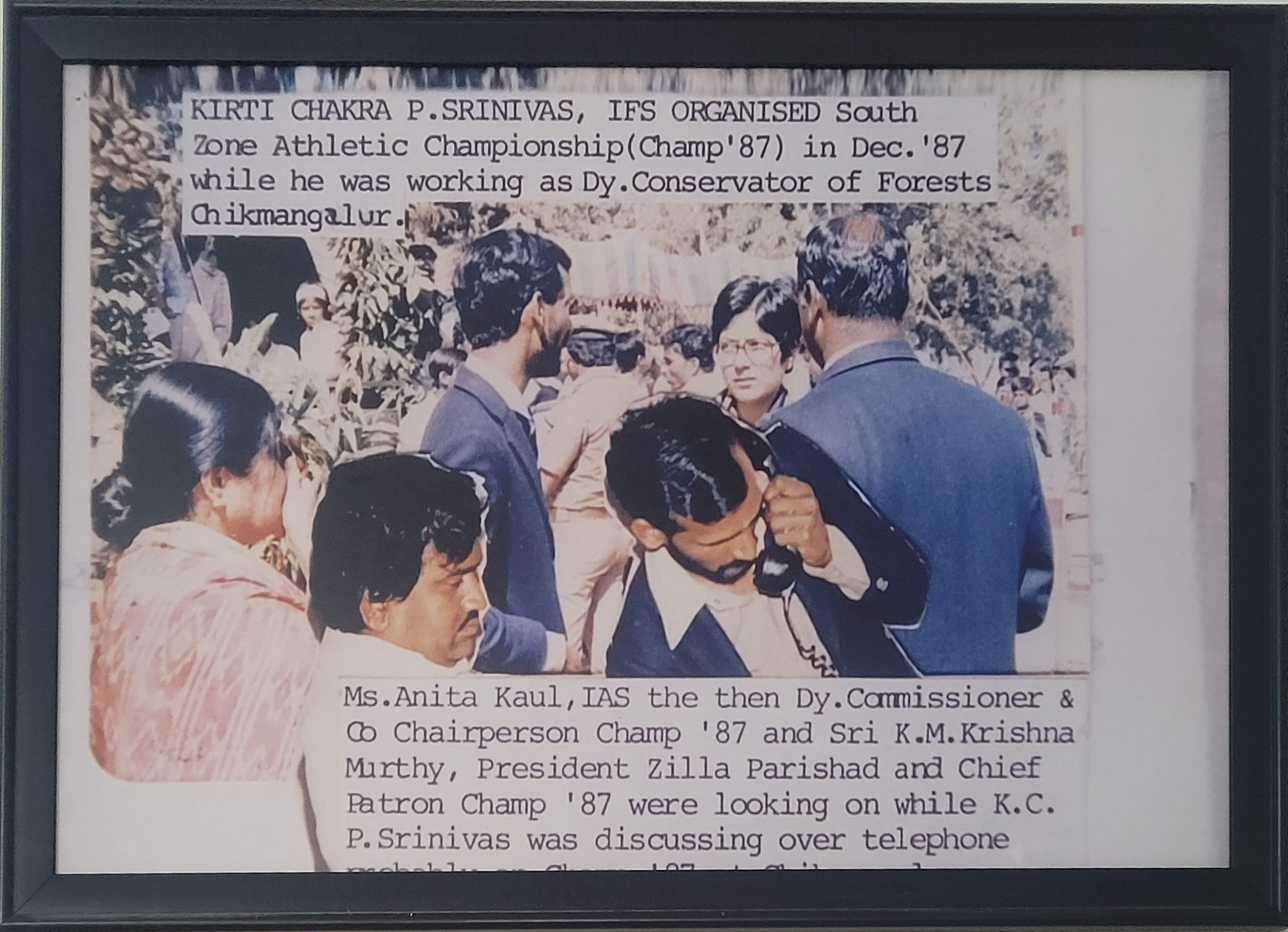
Display in Library dedicated to P.Srinivas at the Office of DCF, Kollegal, Chamarajanagar District, Karnataka.

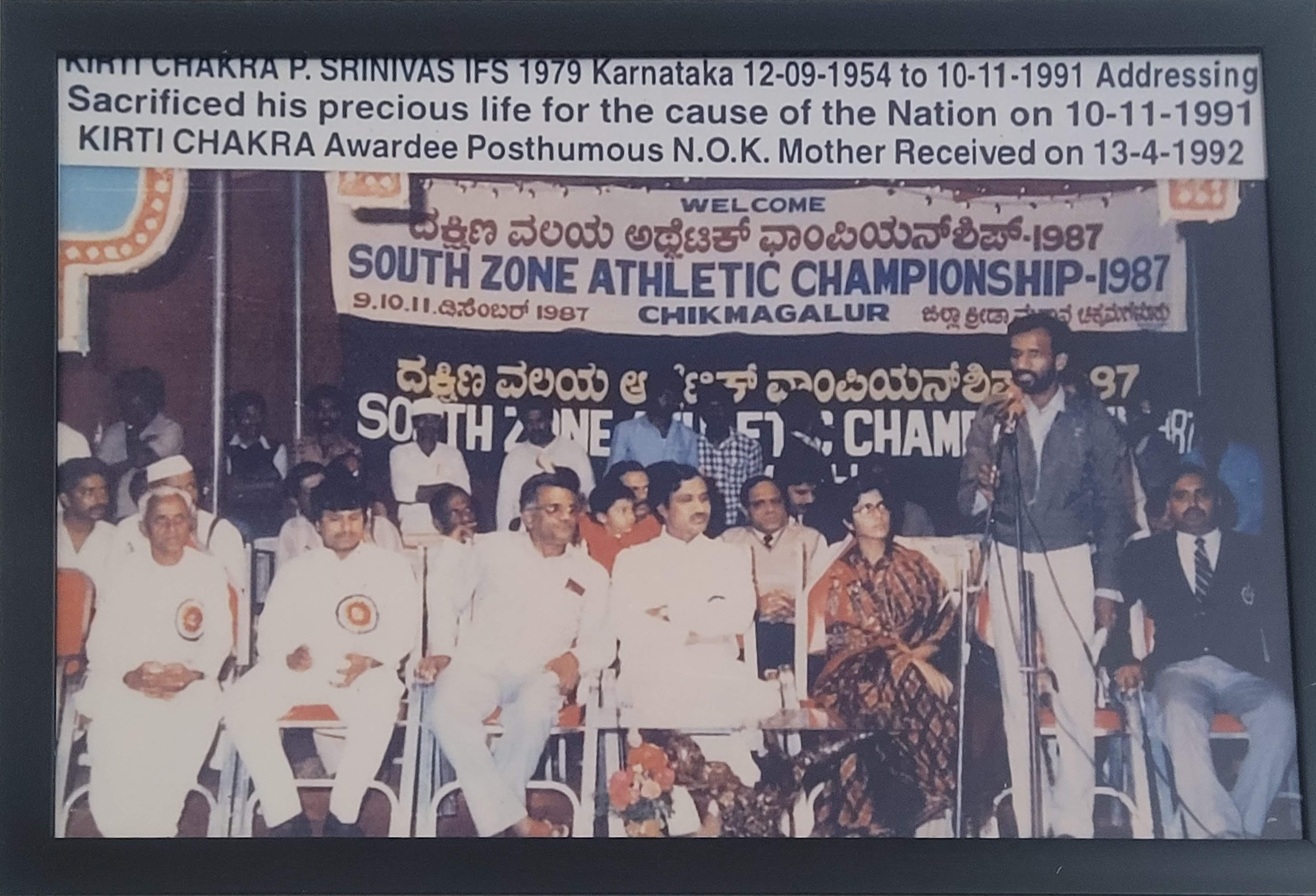
Display in Library dedicated to P.Srinivas at the Office of DCF, Kollegal, Chamarajanagar District, Karnataka.

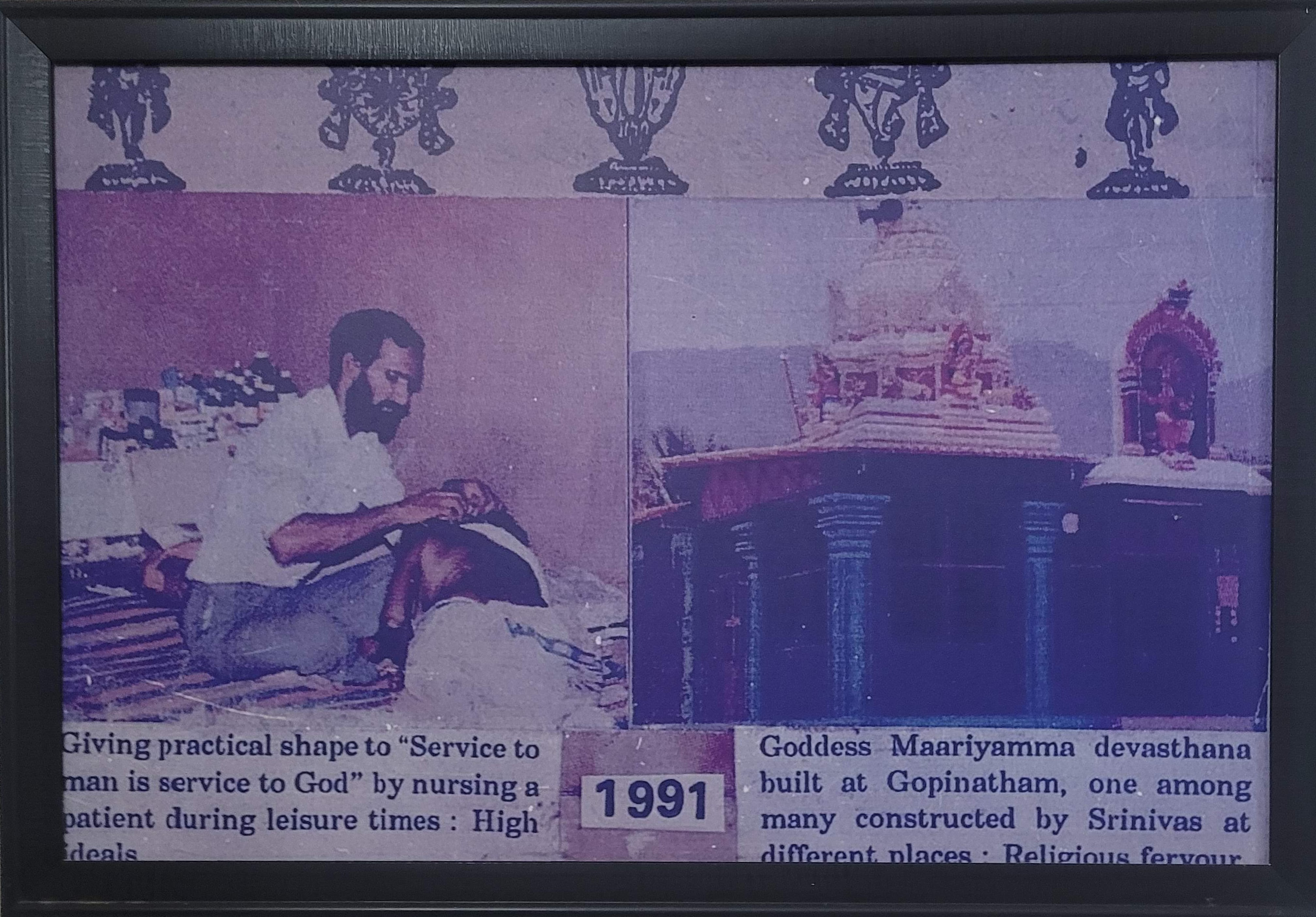
Display in Library dedicated to P.Srinivas at the Office of DCF, Kollegal, Chamarajanagar District, Karnataka.
