= Sanjay Arora (officer) =

Indian police officer

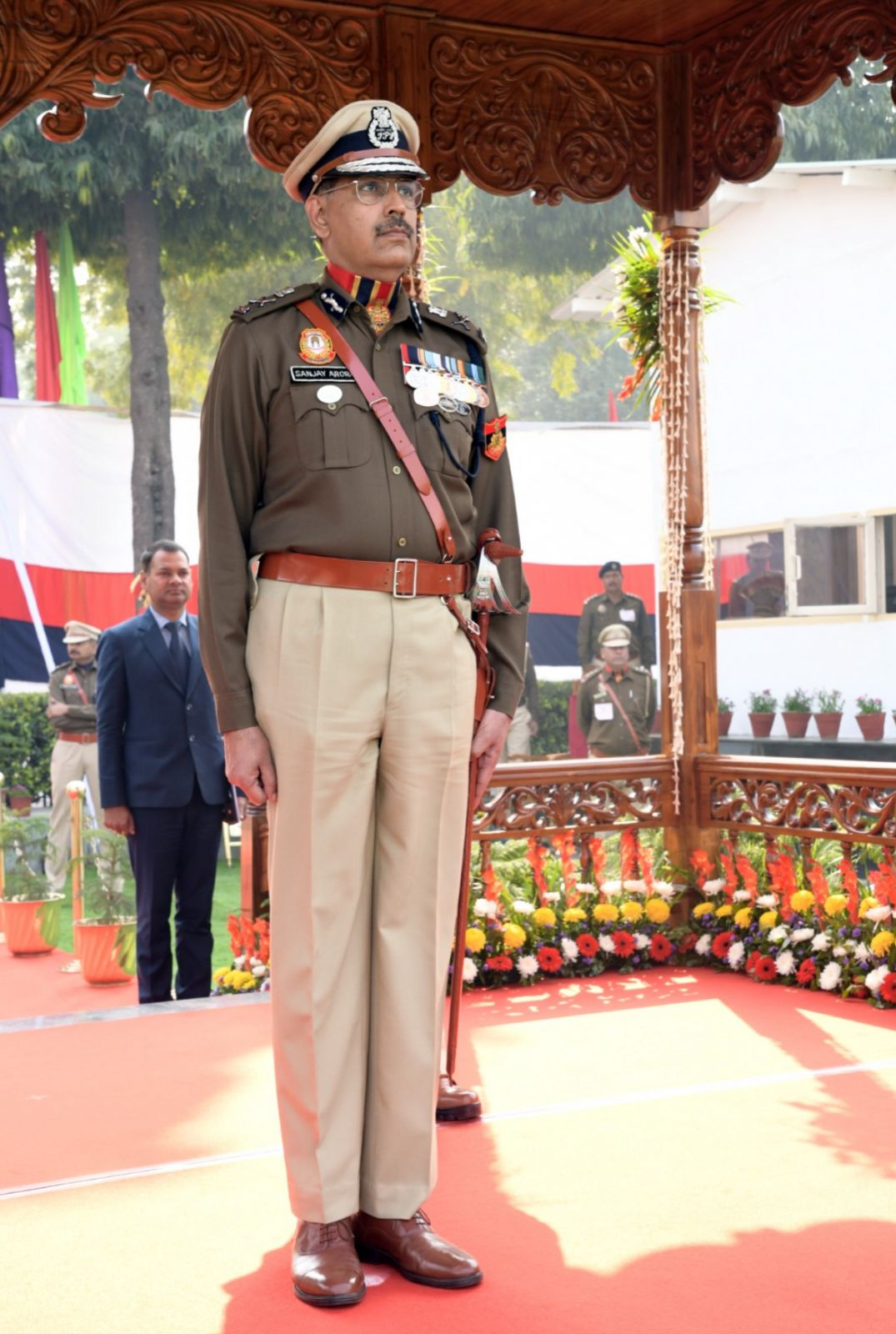
- Shri Sanjay Arora, Commissioner of Police, Delhi
- Born: 27 July 1965 (age 61)
- Education: Malaviya National Institute of Technology, Jaipur
- Police career
- Country: India
- Department: Indian Police Service
- Service years: 1988–2025
- Status: Retired
- Rank: Director General of Police
- Awards: President’s Police Medal for Distinguished Service; Police Medal for Meritorious Service; Antrik Suraksha Padak; UN Peacekeeping Medal; CM's Gallantry Medal for Bravery and Heroic Action; Bar to Special Duty Medal

Sanjay Arora (born 27 July 1965) is a retired IPS officer of the 1988 batch,Tamil Nadu cadre (IPS 88, TN). He served as the Commissioner of the Delhi Police. He has also served as the Chief of Indo-Tibetan Border Police and Sashastra Seema Bal.

== Biography ==
Sanjay Arora joined the IPS in 1988 and was allotted the Tamil Nadu cadre. He obtained his bachelor's degree in Electrical and Electronics Engineering from Malaviya National Institute of Technology, Jaipur.

In Tamil Nadu, he was part of the STF that carried out operations against Veerappan's gang. Being the first IPS volunteer for the force, he was the head of Tamil Nadu STF under the overall command of Walter Dewaram. He has also served in the Coimbatore and Chennai City Police.

He has been part of the United Nations Peacekeeping Mission in Kosovo (UNMIK).

Apart from his home cadre of Tamil Nadu, as part of the ITBP, BSF and CRPF, he has served in Uttarakhand, Chhattisgarh and J&K.

He assumed the charge of DG ITBP on 31 August 2021 as the 31st Chief of the Force. He also held additional charge of DG SSB.

He was appointed as the Commissioner of Police, Delhi in August 2022, becoming only the third officer from outside of the AGMUT cadre to lead the force where he served till 31 July 2025.

== Tenure as Commissioner of Delhi Police (2022–2025) ==
=== Major Developments ===
G20 Leaders’ Summit Security (September 2023) During Arora’s tenure, the Delhi Police was responsible for managing security arrangements for the 2023 G20 New Delhi summit held in New Delhi on 9–10 September 2023. The event was conducted without major security incidents. Over 450 police personnel were awarded Special Commendation Discs and Certificates for their roles in G20-related duties at various venues including IARI Pusa, NGMA, Jaipur House, and IGI Airport.

Special Cell Operations The Delhi Police Special Cell conducted several counter-terrorism and anti-gang operations during this period. In January 2023, two individuals allegedly linked to banned organisations were arrested in Bhalswa Dairy, Delhi, with arms and ammunition recovered. The Special Cell also investigated multiple interstate networks related to organized crime and foiled several plots, including those allegedly linked to ISI and D-Company.

Extradition of Deepak alias "Boxer" In April 2023, Delhi Police, in coordination with central agencies, facilitated the extradition of alleged gangster Deepak alias "Boxer" from Mexico. He was reportedly associated with the Lawrence Bishnoi group and was wanted in multiple criminal cases in India.

Narcotics Seizures Delhi Police, through the Special Cell and other units, reported several narcotics seizures during this period, including one involving contraband valued at over ₹13,000 crore. The seizures were part of ongoing efforts to counter drug trafficking in and around the National Capital Region.

Fingerprint Bureau ISO Certification In July 2025, the Fingerprint Bureau of the Delhi Police received ISO 9001:2015 certification for its quality management practices. According to Delhi Police data, the bureau reported a year-on-year increase in solved cases involving fingerprint evidence between 2022 and 2024.

Reorganization of PCR Unit During Arora’s tenure, the Police Control Room (PCR) function was restructured and separated from the law-and-order division, a reversal of a previous administrative change. The decision was aimed at enhancing response time for emergency calls.

=== Operational Style and Challenges ===
Arora generally maintained a low public profile during his tenure and did not conduct press conferences. The period included several high-profile investigations, including bomb threat incidents, cyber fraud, and murder cases such as the Shraddha Walkar case.

=== Retirement ===
Sanjay Arora retired on 31 July 2025 upon reaching the age of superannuation. A ceremonial parade was held at New Police Lines, Kingsway Camp, following which the charge of Commissioner was handed over to SBK Singh from 1 August 2025. With a tenure of three years, Sanjay Arora has been one of the longest serving Commissioners of Delhi Police.

== Previous appointments ==
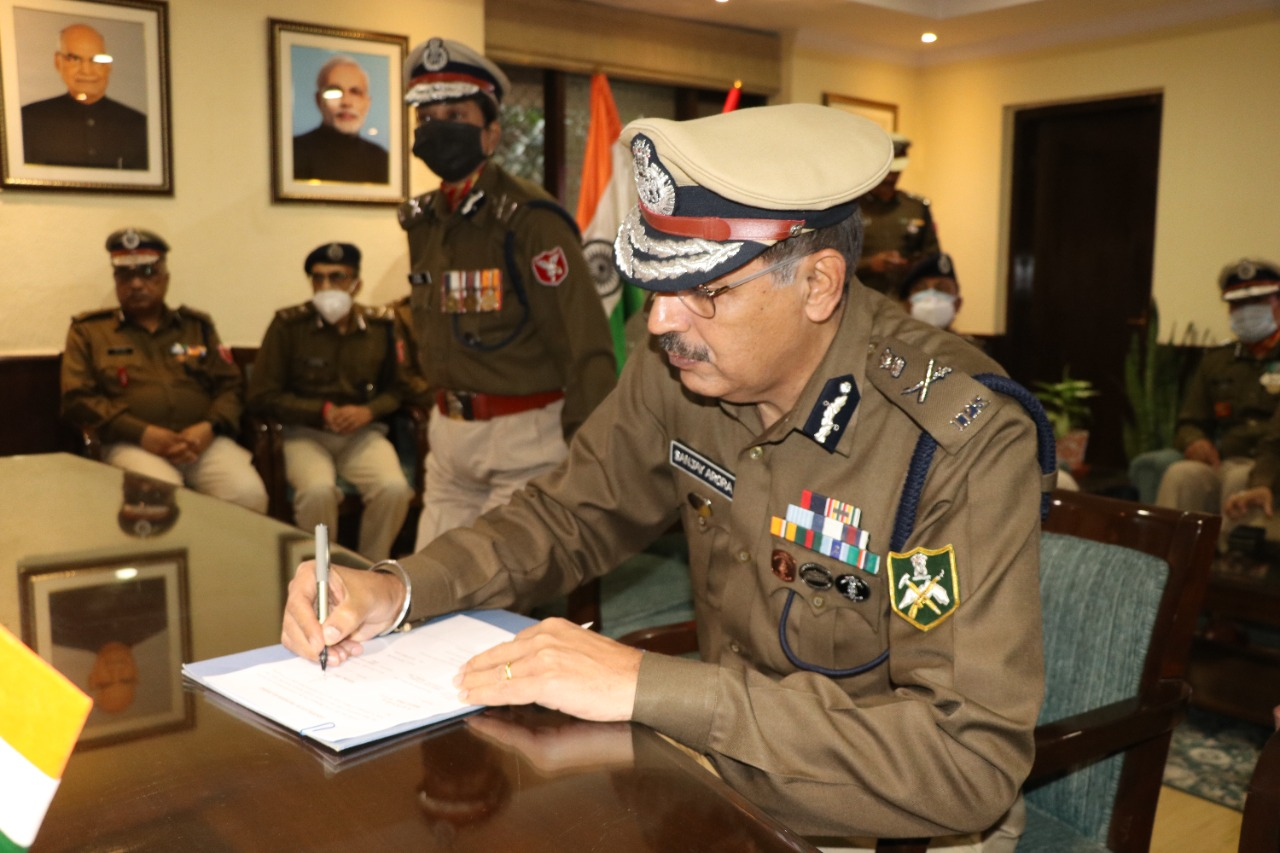
Shri Sanjay Arora, DG ITBP taking over as DG SSB

S.No.	Rank and Post	Organization	Tenure
1.	Director General	Indo Tibetan Border Police (ITBP)	Aug 2021 - Aug 2022
2.	Director General	Sashastra Seema Bal (SSB)	Dec 2021 - Aug 2022
3.	Commissioner of Police	Delhi Police	Aug 2022 - Aug 2025

== Career Postings ==
Sanjay Arora has held several positions across different police and paramilitary forces during his service in the Indian Police Service:

S.No.	Position	From	To
1	Assistant Superintendent of Police (ASP) – Virudhunagar	November 1990	November 1991
2	ASP – Special Security Group	December 1991	June 1993
3	Superintendent of Police (SP) – Special Task Force	June 1993	February 1995
4	SP – Coimbatore (Rural)	February 1995	June 1996
5	SP – Tuticorin	June 1996	April 1997
6	Commandant – 18th Battalion, Indo-Tibetan Border Police (ITBP)	May 1997	December 2000
7	Commandant – Combat Wing, ITBP Academy	December 2000	May 2002
8	Commissioner of Police – Coimbatore City	May 2002	June 2004
9	Deputy Inspector General (DIG) – Viluppuram Range	June 2004	June 2006
10	Deputy Director – Directorate of Vigilance & Anti-Corruption	June 2006	May 2007
11	Inspector General (IG) – Railway Police	May 2007	January 2008
12	IG – West Zone	January 2008	September 2008
13	IG – Armed Police	September 2008	July 2010
14	Additional Commissioner – Crime & Headquarters, Chennai	July 2010	May 2011
15	Additional Commissioner – Traffic, Chennai	May 2011	November 2012
16	Additional Commissioner – Headquarters, Chennai	November 2012	April 2013
17	Additional Director General (ADG) – Operations	April 2013	July 2015
18	ADG – Administration	July 2015	May 2017
19	IG – Special Operations Frontier, Border Security Force (BSF)	May 2017	October 2017
20	IG – Chhattisgarh Sector, Central Reserve Police Force (CRPF)	October 2017	February 2019
21	IG – Operations, CRPF	February 2019	June 2019
22	ADG – Operations & Headquarters, CRPF	June 2019	November 2020
23	Special Director General (SDG) – Jammu & Kashmir and Southern Zone, CRPF	November 2020	August 2021
24	Director General – Indo-Tibetan Border Police (ITBP)	August 2021	July 2022
25	Director General – Sashastra Seema Bal (SSB)	January 2022	July 2022
26	Commissioner of Police – Delhi	August 2022	August 2025

Note: Titles reflect the designations held at the time of service. Dates are based on official records and publicly available sources.

== Awards ==
- Chief Minister Gallantry Medal for Bravery and Heroic Action for operations against gang of Veerappan.
- President's Police Medal for Distinguished Service in 2014
