= Veerappan =

Indian criminal (1952–2004)

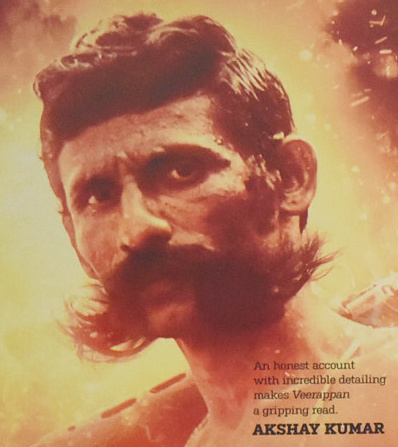
- Veerappan's portrait on the book Chasing the Brigand
- Born: Koose Munusamy Veerappan; 18 January 1952; Gopinatham, Mysore State, India
- Died: 18 October 2004 (aged 52); Papparapatti, Dharmapuri, Tamil Nadu, India
- Cause of death: Ballistic trauma
- Resting place: Moolakadu, Tamil Nadu, India
- Known for: Kidnapping politicians; Sandalwood smuggling; Poaching; Banditry
- Spouse: Muthulakshmi (m. 1990–2004)
- Children: 2
- Reward amount: ₹52 crore (equivalent to ₹217 crore or US$22 million in 2026)
- Capture status: Deceased
- Escaped: 1986
- Escape end: 2004
- Comments: ₹784 crore (equivalent to ₹33 billion or US$340 million in 2026) spent to capture

Details
- Span of crimes: 1962–2002
- Country: India
- States: Tamil Nadu, Karnataka, Kerala

Koose Munisamy Veerappan (18 January 1952 – 18 October 2004) was an Indian brigand who was active for 36 years, and kidnapped major politicians for ransom. He was charged with sandalwood smuggling and poaching of elephants in the scrub lands and forests in the states of Tamil Nadu, Karnataka and Kerala. He was wanted for killing around 184 people, about half of whom were police officers and forest officials. He was also responsible for poaching approximately 500 of the 2,000 elephants killed in the peninsular region where he was active and for smuggling ivory worth US$2.6 million (₹16 crore) and about 65 tons of sandalwood worth approximately US$22 million (₹143 crore).

The battle to capture Veerappan cost the governments of Tamil Nadu and Karnataka over ₹100 crore.

== Personal life ==
Veerappan was born into a Tamil family in Gopinatham, Kollegala, Chamarajanagar District, Karnataka, in 1952. In 1990, he was married to Muthulakshmi, who reportedly married him because of his "notoriety and moustache". As of 2004, his two daughters, Vidya Rani (born in 1990) and Prabha (born in 1993), were studying in Tamil Nadu. He had support from the Pattali Makkal Katchi party which openly sought for clemency on behalf of Veerappan.

== Criminal history ==
Veerappan began his criminal career by assisting his uncle Sevi Gounder, a notorious poacher and sandalwood smuggler. Veerappan initially worked as a sandalwood and ivory smuggler, killing elephants for their tusks. He later broke away from his uncle. Over the next 25 years, Veerappan and other poachers together killed 2,000 to 3,000 elephants, with Veerappan and his gang responsible for approximately 500 of them. He was first arrested in 1972.

After committing his first murder, at the age of 17, he began killing those who resisted his illegal activities. His victims tended to be police officers, forest officials, and informants.

In 1987, Veerappan kidnapped and murdered a Sathyamangalam Taluka forest officer named Chidambaram from Tamil Nadu. This brought his activities to the attention of the Indian Government. He drew further attention by murdering a senior IFS officer, Pandillapalli Srinivas, in November 1991. Next, there was the August 1992 ambush of a police party, which included a senior IPS officer, Harikrishna.

Veerappan was not averse to killing civilians, and killed a man from his native village for traveling in a police jeep. He regularly killed anyone suspected of being a police informer. Because of political instability, Veerappan could easily escape from one state to another. State jurisdiction problems also prevented police officers from entering other states to apprehend Veerappan.

=== Palar blast ===
In Govindapadi, Mettur, Veerappan killed a Bandari person whom he suspected of being a police informer. As a result, a 41-member team of police officers and forestry officials were called in to investigate. On 9 April 1993, landmines were detonated underneath the two vehicles in which the team was traveling. The blast occurred at Palar, near Malai Mahadeswara Hills (present-day Chamarajanagar District, Karnataka) and killed 22 members of the team. Known as the Palar blast, this was Veerappan's single largest mass killing.

=== Special Task Force ===
In 1992, the Karnataka and the Tamil Nadu Governments formed a Special Task Force to catch Veerappan. It was headed in Tamil Nadu by Sanjay Arora and in Karnataka by Shankar Bidari with Walter Devaram as the joint chief. In February 1992, his lieutenant Gurunathan was killed by the Karnataka task force, with SI Shakeel Ahmed single-handedly responsible for the capture. Three months later, Veerappan attacked the Ramapura police station in Kollegal, killing several policemen and capturing arms and ammunition. In August 1992, Veerappan laid a trap for SI Shakeel Ahmed, killing him along with five others. The Karnataka and Tamil Nadu Special Task Forces then began intensified combing operations along the two states' border areas and also around Gopinatham village, Veerappan's birthplace.

Through these operations, under charge of Sanjay Arora and Shankar Bidari, the gang was reduced to 5 members. Meetings with Gopinatham villagers were held, and the 5-crore bounty was announced. In 1993, the task force arrested Veerappan's wife, Muthulakshmi, and charged her with aiding, but she was acquitted of all charges.

=== Kidnapping of Rajkumar ===
On 30 June 2000, Veerappan abducted Kannada cinema actor Rajkumar and three others from Dodda Gajanur, a village in Sathyamangalam taluk Erode district near the Tamil Nadu-Karnataka border, where the film star was attending his housewarming ceremony. Public outcry and violence ensued in Bangalore as well as other parts of Karnataka. A bandh, or strike, also occurred on 22 September in Bangalore. Karnataka's Chief Minister and police personnel sought the help of Tamil Nadu Government and visited Chennai seeking help. Negotiations were conducted and R. Gopal, an editor of the Tamil magazine Nakkeeran, was involved in several rounds of talks with Veerappan. Gopal had earlier visited Veerappan for similar negotiations, and visited the forest several times for videotaped discussions. Veerappan demanded justice for Tamil Nadu in the Kaveri Water dispute, as well as making Tamil the second official language of Karnataka and the release of certain Tamil political prisoners jailed in Tamil Nadu. Rajkumar was held for 108 days and finally released without harm in November 2000. A police official later revealed that 20 crore rupees had been paid by Karnataka government for his release.

=== Kidnapping of Nagappa ===
On 25 August 2002, Veerappan abducted H. Nagappa, a former minister of Karnataka, from his village in Kamagere, Chamarajanagar district. Nagappa had been a minister for Agricultural Marketing from 1996 to 1999. The Joint Special task forces of Karnataka and Tamil Nadu worked with the Kerala police to help release Nagappa. The encounter to release him failed, and Nagappa was found dead three months later in a Karnataka forest. The reward offered by the Karnataka state government was then increased to 15 crore rupees.

=== Ransom demands ===
For several years during the 1990s, Veerappan kidnapped police officials and other personalities and demanded ransom money. It is believed that ransoms were often unofficially paid. In July 1997, he kidnapped nine forest officials in the Burude forests in Chamarajanagar district. In that case, the hostages were released unharmed a few years later even though his ransom demand was not met. It is also believed that Veerappan buried large amounts of money in various parts of the forest; in 2002 police recovered 3.3 million rupees from his gang members.

Banned organisations like the Tamil National Retrieval Troops (TNRT) and Tamil Nadu Liberation Army helped Veerappan to secure a Robin Hood image and to draft terms of negotiations when he kidnapped prominent people. Kolathur Mani, president of Dravidar Viduthalai Kazhagam, formerly the Periyar Dravidar Kazhagam (PDK) party, was arrested and brought to trial as an accomplice in several of Veerappan's crimes, although later acquitted due to lack of evidence.

== Death ==
On 18 October 2004, Veerappan and three of his associates were killed by the Karnataka and Tamil Nadu Special Task Force and N. K. Senthamarai Kannan under the leadership of Shankar Bidari and K. Vijay Kumar.

The encounter happened near the village of Papparapatti in Dharmapuri district, Tamil Nadu. Veerappan and his men were lured into an ambulance by an undercover policeman under the pretext of taking them to Dharmapuri for medical treatment. The Tamil Nadu Special Task Force, which had been observing his movements for several months, surrounded the ambulance, and the gangsters were killed in the ensuing gunfight.

The entire operation was named Operation Cocoon. Veerappan's associates Sethukuli Govindan, Chandre Gowdar and Sethumani were also killed in the operation.

His death was described as the "death of a demon". The villagers of Gopinatham celebrated with firecrackers on hearing the news.

Several human rights activists, who rallied under the banner of the Centre for Protection of Civil Liberties (CPCL), claimed that circumstantial evidence indicated that Veerappan was murdered in custody by police after being tortured.

Veerappan was buried at Moolakkadu near Mettur in Tamil Nadu, as his family members were more attached to it, and most of his relatives in Gopinatham had left. The police had planned a cremation but decided on a burial after objections from Veerappan's relatives. Thousands of people turned out for the burial, while others were kept away by heavy security.

== Timeline ==
Timeline of Veerappan's activities
Year	Veerappan's Activities
1962	Veerappan's first crime. He was just 10 when he gunned down a tusker with the help of his mentor Sevi Gounder at Gopinatham. Nabbed three forest officials and killed them.
1970	Joined a gang of poachers.
27 August 1983	Killed K. M. Prithvi (age 25), a forest guard, near Mavukal, Ponnampet, Kodagu, Karnataka when the guard tried to prevent elephant poaching by the gang.
1986	Arrested and lodged at Boodipada forest guest house but escaped under mysterious circumstances (reportedly bribed a police officer).
26 August 1986	Killed Siddarama Naik, a forest watcher at Alegowdana Katte, Gundlupet, Karnataka.
1987	Kidnapped and hacked Tamil Nadu forest officer Chidambaram.
5 January 1989	Kidnapped and killed five members of a rival gang.
1989	Killed three forest personnel after 15 days of abducting them from Begur forest range.
9 April 1990	Killed three police SI Dinesh, Jagannath, Ramalingu and police constable Shankara Rao near Hogenakal. Shot and beheaded Karnataka deputy conservator of forests, Srinivas, as revenge for Veerappan's sister Mala's suicide (the victim's head was traced three years later).
1991	Abducted son of a granite quarry owner and demanded ransom of Rs. 1 crore; released him for a ransom of Rs. 15 lakhs.
10 November 1991	Murdered former forestry official, P. Srinivas, by luring him to an ambush site. Veerappan had offered to surrender, if Srinivas came unaccompanied and unarmed. Srinivas was shot while crossing a nullah 6 kilometers from Gopinatham village.
1992	Attacked a police station in Ramapura, killing five policemen, injuring two and stealing arms and ammunition. STF killed two gang members in retaliation.
14 August 1992	Meenyam Ambush: Trapped and killed Mysore District SP, T. Harikrishna, SI Shakeel Ahmed and four constables named Benegonda, C. M. Kalappa, Sundara and M. P. Appachu, through a false informant near Meenyam in Karnataka.
25 January 1993	Veerappan and his gang had a close encounter and missed by a whisker the police team headed by "Rambo" Gopalakrishnan, Police officer from Tamil Nadu; one of his gang members and close associate Antony Raj was gunned down.
1993	Border Security force (BSF) was deployed to hunt Veerappan but felt that language was the main barrier to carry out a successful operation. Deployment of Border Security Force (of Central Government) was disliked by Tamil Nadu Government. Veerappan killed about 20 combatants of BSF.
April 1993	Trapped and blew up a Tamil Nadu bus carrying police, forest officials and civilians, using a landmine, which killed 22 civilians and police in Palar blast incident.
24 May 1993	Killed 6 policemen K. M. Uthappa, Prabhakara, Poovaiah, Machaiah, Swamy and Narasappa of STF commander Gopal Hosur's party and injured the police commander near Rangaswamy Vaddu, M. M. Hills, Karnataka. Tamil Nadu government deploys Border Security Force (BSF). Joint operations of BSF and STF arrested 9 gang members and killed 6. Three policemen were killed. Veerappan requested amnesty. Victim's relatives opposed any type of government negotiations.
1994	Abducted Chidambaranathan, Deputy Superintendent of Police, Coimbatore and two others.
1995	In November, kidnapped three forest department officials of Tamil Nadu.
1996	Killed a police informer. Killed another 19 police personnel. Wounded police official Tamilselvan and killed a constable as revenge for the suicide of Veerappan's brother Arjunan in police custody.
1997	The gang kidnapped wildlife photographers Senani and Krupakar. Veerappan apparently killed 'Baby Veerappan', a gang member, who had visions to succeed Veerappan. Kidnapped and released other photographers Senani and Krupakar. Kidnapped and executed nine Karnataka forest officials from Burude forests.
1998	Kidnapped Prof. Krishnasamy, A. S. Mani – editor "Netikan", Payumpuli – reporter and Richard Mohan – photographer. Special Task Force released them after combing operation.
2000	Kidnapped Kannada film actor Dr. Rajkumar. Released him after 108 days (ransomed).
2002	Kidnapped and allegedly killed former Karnataka minister H. Nagappa. There are other sources, including police of Karnataka who claims that the bullet in the body of the former minister was from a rifle used by the Tamil Nadu Special Task Force (possibly the rifle used was stolen from Tamil Nadu task force or crossfire could have caused his death).
18 October 2004	Killed by Tamil Nadu Special Task Force members at a checkpoint, when the bandit was travelling in an ambulance driven by a disguised policeman.

== Legacy ==
On April 25, 2013, the Pattali Makkal Katchi and the Vanniyar Sangam called Veerappan a youth icon at the Vanniyar Youth Cultural Festival at Mamallapuram. The incident was condemned by Jayalalithaa, the then Chief Minister of Tamil Nadu.

== In media ==
=== Film and television ===
- Veerappan – a 1991 Indian Kannada-language crime action film by Raveendranath, starring Devaraj in the titular role of the bandit.
- Attahasa – a 2012 Kannada film, is based on Veerappan's life and death. The movie highlights the STF operations on Veerappan, kidnapping of Dr. Rajkumar and ultimately the Operation Cocoon. The film was also dubbed to Telugu and Malayalam in 2013 titled as Veerappan and in Tamil as Vana Yuddham.
- Killing Veerappan – a 2016 Kannada film, written and directed by Ram Gopal Varma based on Operation Cocoon. The film was also released in Tamil, Telugu and Malayalam consequently with the same title.
- Veerappan – a 2016 Hindi full length biographical feature film written and directed by Ram Gopal Varma. The film was also released in Tamil as Villathi Villan Veerappan.
- Sandhanakaadu – a 2007 Tamil television series aired on Makkal TV, based on Veerappan's life starring Karate Raja as Veerappan.
- The Hunt for Veerappan – A docuseries directed by Selvamani Selvaraj which premiered on Netflix on 4 August 2023.
- Koose Munisamy Veerappan - A documentary series explores the life of Veerappan using footage shot by Nakkeeran Gopal and archived by Nakkheeran.

=== Books ===
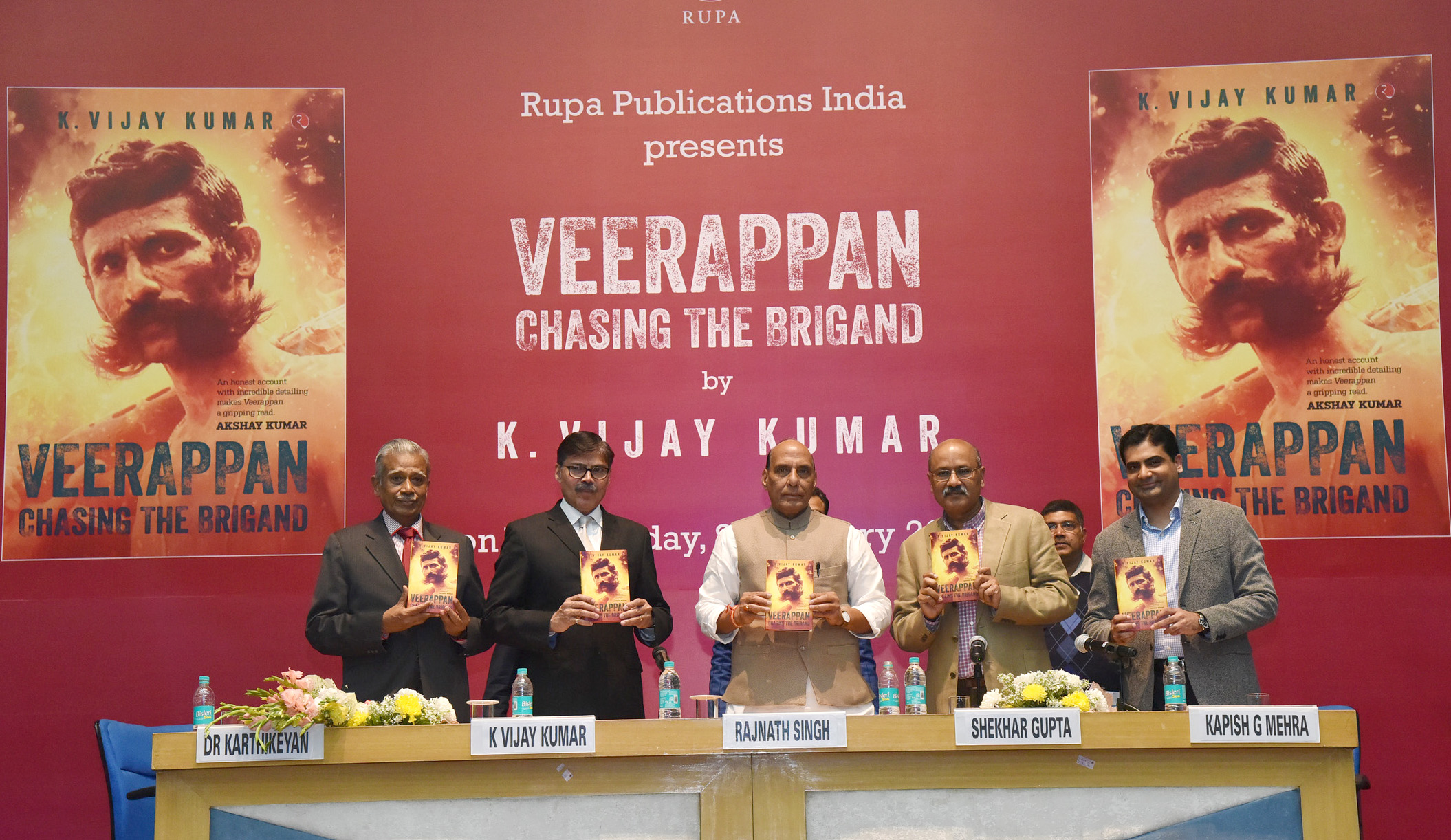
Government of India inaugurating a book ′Veerappan, Chasing the Brigand′, written by Senior Security Adviser K. Vijay Kumar, on 8 February 2017

Title	Author	Language	Translations
Veerappan: India's Most Wanted Man	Sunaad Raghuram	English	Marathi: Veerappan: The Untold Story
Sereyalli Kaleda Hadinalku Dinagalu	Krupakar & Senani	Kannada	English: Birds, Beasts and Bandits: 14 days with Veerappan
Huliya Nenapugalu	B. B. Ashok Kumar	Kannada	English: Memories of Tiger: Hunting Veerappan
Veerappan's Prize Catch: Rajkumar	C. Dinakar	English	
Veerappan: Chasing the Brigand	K. Vijay Kumar	English	Tamil: Veerappan Kannada: Veerappan: Dantachorana Bennatti Hindi: Veerappana: Ek Satya Katha Marathi: Veerappan Viruddh Vijay Kumar
Veerappan	Nakkeeran Gopal	Tamil	
Veerappan Valnthathum Veelnthathum	Sivasubramaniam Periyasamy	Tamil	Veerappan's Saga - Rise and Fall
Veerapan Death Warrant	S. K. Umesh	Kannada	
Veerapan Blood Warrant	S. K. Umesh	Kannada	

== See also ==
- Lampiao
- Paan Singh Tomar
- Phoolan Devi
- Seema Parihar
- Velupillai Prabhakaran
