= Walter Devaram =

Indian police officer (born 1939)

Walter Isaac Davaram
- Born: 20 July 1939 (age 87); Munnar, Idukki District, Kerala
- Education: Madras Christian College, Annamalai University
- Occupation: Indian Police Service

Walter Issac Devaram (born 20 July 1939) is a retired Indian Police Service officer. He served as the director general of police for the state of Tamil Nadu.

He was a former Army officer before he sat for the IPS wherein he stood first in the order of merit. He curbed the Naxal menace with an iron hand during his stint as DIG/Vellore Range and Intelligence Unit Tamil Nadu Police. He led the joint forces set up by Tamil Nadu and Karnataka Government to apprehend the forest brigand, Veerappan. He also served as the vice chairman of the Sports Development Authority of Tamil Nadu. He retired from service on 31 July 1997.
