= Tamil Nadu Liberation Army =

Indian militant separatist group

Flag of the group.

Tamil Nadu Liberation Army (TNLA) was a militant separatist group in India. It sought an independent nation for the Tamil people, and first appeared in the 1980s, when the Indian Peace Keeping Force (IPKF) was sent to Sri Lanka to fight against the Liberation Tigers of Tamil Eelam (LTTE), a similar militant group in the island nation.

It had its roots in the Naxalite movement, and was headed by Thamizharasan, an engineering student from Ponparappi village. TNLA was involved in minor bomb blasts, murders and looting banks.

On 1 September 1987, the people of Ponparappi village lynched Thamizharasan and four of his associates, when they attempted to rob a bank. After his death, the group fell into disarray and splintered into factions. TNLA was banned by the Tamil Nadu State Government, and also by the Union Government on the recommendation of the State Government. It has been declared a terrorist organisation by the Government of India.

The group also carried out several bomb attacks on government buildings, railways, and buses, causing significant damage and loss of life.

The last major incident involving the group was a clash with police in 2005, in which four cadres of the outfit was arrested. In the following years the organization lost most of its strength and influence and is considered as defunct.

== See also ==
- List of terrorist organisations in India
- Tamil Eelam Liberation Army
