= Muthulakshmi =

Tamil activist and widow

Muthulakshmi was the wife of bandit Veerappan, from 1990 to his death in 2004. She lived in Salem, Tamil Nadu, India. She was born in Neruppore village, Dharmapuri District to a farming family.

== Wife of Veerappan ==
She married Veerappan in 1990, and lived with him in the forests of the border areas Tamil Nadu, Karnataka and Kerala. She was arrested several times on charges of aiding and abetting various crimes and murders carried out by Veerappan's gang. The police also charged that Veerappan gave Muthulakshmi a large amount of money after he reportedly received ransom money for his role in Kannada actor Rajkumar's kidnapping.

=== Arrests ===
Five charges were laid against Muthulakshmi, including killing police personnel in the Palar blast, killing elephants, and smuggling sandalwood between 1991 and 1993. She was also arrested for kidnapping Rajkumar alongside Veerappan (Rajkumar was released after 108 days). In spite of the efforts of the police, they were unable to apprehend Veerappan. Muthulakshmi was acquitted along with 10 others; however, 13 of her relatives were convicted. Muthulakshmi was acquitted of almost all charges registered against her.

== Personal life ==
Muthulakshmi has two daughters, Vidyarani and Prabha Vijayalakshmi, who, as of 2011, were engineering students in Tamil Nadu.

After her acquittal announced she would be undertaking social service activities to help people and those who were affected by law enforcement agencies for helping Veerappan. She filed a case against filmmaker A.M.R. Ramesh for showing her slain husband poorly in his film Attahasa and received compensation of ₹25 lakhs before the picture was released.

=== Politics ===
Muthulakshmi unsuccessfully ran for Tamil Nadu Assembly elections in 2006, and has political ambitions to make use of her late husband's "Robin Hood" image to help people.

In January 2018, she announced the formation of 'Mann Kaakkum Veerathamizhar Peramaippu' (Federation of Brave Tamils to protect the Soil) to lobby the government for fresh water to assist farmers.
