= Papparapatti, Dharmapuri =

Papparapatti Pallur Pettai
- Town panchayat
- Location in Tamil Nadu, India
- Coordinates: 12°13′N 78°04′E
- Country: India
- State: Tamil Nadu
- District: Dharmapuri

Population (2011)
  - Total: 12,174

Languages
  - Official: Tamil / English
- Time zone: UTC+5:30 (IST)
- PIN (636809): 636809
- Telephone code: 04342
- Vehicle registration: TN-29

Papparapatti is a panchayat town in Dharmapuri district in the Indian state of Tamil Nadu. The original name of this town was Pallur Pettai, later it was officially renamed as Papparapatti by the local government.

== Demographics ==
As of 2011 India census, Papparapatti had a population of 8583. Males constitute 51% of the population and females 49%. Papparapatti has an average literacy rate of 80%, higher than the national average of 59.5%: male literacy is 78%, and female literacy is 61%. In Papparapatti, 12% of the population is under 6 years of age.

== Geography ==
Papparapatti is a small settlement located around 15 km west of Dharmapuri in Dharmapuri District. Surrounded by lush green forests, the place is seven square kilometers in area.

== History ==
Freedom fighter Subramanya Siva Memorial is the prime attraction. It is also known for the temple of Sri Ragavendra Swami in the village popularly known as Dakshina Mantralaya.

On 18 October 2004, Veerappan and three of his associates were killed by the Tamil Nadu Special Task Force headed by K. Vijay Kumar. The killing happened near the village of Papparapatti.

== Transportation ==
The neighboring places are Krishnagiri, Karimangalam and Mallapuram. By road, Papparapatti can be accessed from Dharmapuri. Bangalore International Airport is the nearest airport. Dharmapuri Railway Station serves Papparapatti. The National Highway 7 passes close to the town.
