= Special Task Force (India) =

Special police units of India

- Abbreviation: STF

Agency overview
- Formed: 1980s

Jurisdictional structure
- Operations jurisdiction: India

In India, a Special Task Force (STF) is a type of special police force tasked to deal with violent issues such as wanted criminals and insurgencies. They are primarily formed due to lack of adequate police forces for a task, like neutralizing a criminal network or carrying out anti-terrorism measures. Every state has their own power to constitute an STF.

The states of Tamil Nadu and Karnataka first raised Special Task forces in the 1980s to counter ivory poacher, Veerapan, whom the forces eventually killed in 2004 with Operation Cocoon. In late 1980s, such forces were formed in Punjab to counter an insurgency. An STF was also formed on May 1998 in Uttar Pradesh by IPS AjayRaj Sharma on the recommendation of IAS RajivRatan Shah to kill the infamous dreaded criminal ShreePrakash Shukla, mission led by IPS Rajesh Pandey, under the name of 'Operation BAZOOKA'.

== Uttar Pradesh ==
An STF was first formed in 1998 by the Uttar Pradesh Police to kill Prakash Shukla. Because at that time crime was at its peak in Uttar Pradesh. In the 1990s Prakash Shukla had become the biggest name of terror in Uttar Pradesh.The fear of Prakash Shukla in the 90s was such that even the police used to go out of his way. Shukla had driven an AK-47 with him for the first time onto the soil of Uttar Pradesh in 1996. In response to these military-like tactics, an STF was formed for the first time in Uttar Pradesh. Prakash Shukla is still considered as the biggest don of Uttar Pradesh. The extortion and other illegal activities were at its all-time high. The STF proved to be very successful in capturing criminals and controlling crimes in UP. Since then it has been an integral part of UP police.

=== The special Task Force of UP Police was created vide GO No. 1889 (1) VI-Pu-2-98-1100 (35) dated 4.5.98 of UP Government for the following objectives ===
1. Collection of Intelligence about Mafia gangs and Intelligence based action against such gangs.
2. Preparation of action plan and its execution against Disruptive Elements specially ISI agents.
3. Action against listed gangs in coordination with the district police.
4. Effective action against gang of dacoits, especially inter-district gangs.
5. Effective action against inter-district gangs of Organized criminals.

With the creation of the ATS, charter no 2, i.e., action for prevention of disruptive activities especially ISI agents have been transferred to the ATS.

The STF is headed by an Additional Director General rank officer, who is assisted by an Inspector General of Police. The STF works as teams, with each team headed by either an Additional SP or Deputy SP. The SSP is in charge of all the operations conducted by the STF. STF has a pan-UP jurisdiction. Its teams also operate outside the state, with the assistance of respective State police.

UP STF relies extensively upon human intelligence, technology, and sophisticated tactics to achieve its objectives. Over its short lifetime of about 15 years, UP STF has an enviable history of boasting of 81 Police Medals of Gallantry awarded by the President of India and 60 officers being granted out-of-turn promotion for acts of conspicuous gallantry. ′′′′′′

The states of Bihar and Jharkhand also have a Special Task Force.

== West Bengal ==
STF in West Bengal primarily mandate to deal in offences related to terrorism, FICN (counterfeiting), narcotics, arms, ammunition and explosives, money laundering and sedition.

On August 2008 Kolkata Police established Special Task Force through merging two Anti-terrorist squads. Kolkata Police STF Unit function under Police Commissioner of Kolkata.

On Sept 2019 West Bengal government created new directorate of the Special Task Force under West Bengal Police STF, West Bengal is a separate field unit functioning under the DGP West Bengal Police.

== Arunachal Pradesh ==
Likewise Arunachal Pradesh Police also has a Special Task Force Company formed in the year 2008.
