= List of newspapers in Chennai =

This is a List of newspapers in Chennai that are based and headquartered in the city. The availability of multimedia news platforms has accelerated in the 21st century, and by the close of 2017, no Chennai newspaper had a monthly circulation below two million readership, making the city one of the most widest newspaper reading city in the world along with the likes of New York, Paris, London, Tokyo and Sydney.

== List of newspapers based in Chennai ==
The list is the newspapers based in Chennai and their circulation.

Title	Published	Language	Monthly Readership (2017)
Dina Thanthi	Daily	Tamil	23,149,000
Dinakaran	Daily	Tamil	12,083,000
Dinamalar	Daily	Tamil	11,659,000
The Hindu	Daily	English	5,300,000
Maalai Malar	Daily (evening)	Tamil	3,074,000
The Hindu (Tamil)	Daily	Tamil	2,890,000
The New Indian Express	Daily	English	1,507,000
Business Line	Daily	English	1,459,000
Malai Murasu	Daily (evening)	Tamil	1,433,000
Dinamani	Daily	Tamil	1,419,000
Theekkathir	Daily	Tamil	1,308,000
News Today	Daily	English	1,212,000
The Trinity Mirror	Daily (evening)	English	1,013,000
Makkal Kural	Daily (evening)	Tamil	974,000
Madras Musings	Fortnightly	English	893,500
Tamil Murasu (India)	Daily	Tamil	789,000
Nellai Maalai Murasu	Daily (evening)	Tamil	719,000
Hello Mirror Madras	Daily	English/Tamil	699,300
Tamil Makkal Kural	Daily	Tamil	599,400
Ullatchi Murasu	Daily	Tamil	264,185

== List of magazines based in Chennai ==
The list is the magazines headquartered in Coimbatore and their circulation.

Title	Published	Readership (2017)
Sportstar	Weekly	2,937,000
Ananda Vikatan	Weekly	2,708,000
Kumudam	Weekly	2,269,000
Kungumam	Weekly	2,172,000
Puthiya Thalaimurai	Weekly	1,623,000
Aval Vikatan	Fortnightly	1,104,000
Kalki (magazine)	Weekly	1,090,000
Frontline (magazine)	Weekly	1,057,000
Sruti (magazine)	Monthly	1,003,700
