= Kayamozhi =

Kayamozhi Kayamoli
- Village
- Location in Tamil Nadu, India Kayamozhi (India)
- Coordinates: 8°30′32″N 78°2′43″E
- Country: India
- State: Tamil Nadu
- District: Thoothukudi

Government
  - Type: Panchayath
  - Body: Kayamozhi Panchayat

Population
  - Total: 5,497

Languages
  - Official: Tamil, English
- Time zone: UTC+5:30 (IST)
- PIN: 628205
- Telephone code: 04639
- Vehicle registration: TN69
- Nearest city: Tiruchendur
- Sex ratio: 1000:1154 ♂/♀
- Literacy: 85%
- Lok Sabha constituency: Thoothukudi; Formerly with Tiruchendur
- Vidhan Sabha constituency: Tiruchendur
- Civic agency: Kayamozhi Panchayat
- Website: kayamozhi.com

Kayamozhi (Tamil pronunciation: [/kaːjaːmoɻi/]) is a village situated 9 km west of Thiruchendur in Thoothukudi District, Tamil Nadu, India. The village was established in the 16th century as the capital of the former Vadapattu region. It is located at an elevation of 15 metres (49 feet) above mean sea level.

== Civics ==
=== Administration ===
Kayamozhi is administered as a village panchayat. The administrative offices located in the village include the Kayamozhi Panchayat Office and the Village Administrative Officer (VAO) Office. The key administrative officials are the Village Administrative Officer, the Village Panchayat President, and the Panchayat Secretary.

== Demographics ==
As of 2022, Kayamozhi has a total population of 5,497, comprising 2,552 males and 2,945 females. The literacy rate of the village is 85%.

=== Religion ===
According to available data, the majority of the population in Kayamozhi follows Hinduism, while smaller proportions adhere to Islam and Christianity:

Religion Data – Kayamozhi village
Religion	Percent(%)
Hindu	90.16%
Muslim	5.83%
Christian	4.01%

=== Caste ===
The population of Kayamozhi includes various communities such as Other Backward Classes (OBCs; including Vellalars, Nadars, Devars, and Maruthuvars), Scheduled Castes (SCs; including Paraiyars and Arunthathiyars), and certain nomadic tribes. Scheduled Castes constitute an estimated 30–40 percent of the population.

== Geography ==
Kayamozhi lies within the Thoothukudi district of Tamil Nadu.

=== Boundaries and landmarks ===
Directions	Landmarks
South	Mayandi Swamy Temple and Canal Bridge
North	RT Mani Nadar Wedding Hall
East	Canals and Muppudathi Amman Temple
West	Vanagamudi Ayyanar Temple
Southeast	Kayamozhi Pond
Southwest	Red Sand Dunes
Northeast	Oothangaraivilai Canal
Northwest	Temples

== Economy ==
The economy of Kayamozhi is primarily dependent on agriculture.

=== Government schemes ===
Several government schemes are implemented in the village, including:

- Mahatma Gandhi Rural Empowerment Scheme
- Swachh Bharat Abhiyan (Clean India Mission)

== Facilities and utilities ==
=== Educational institutions ===
Kayamozhi has several educational institutions, including:

- S. B. Aditanar Government Higher Secondary School, Kayamozhi
- Govindammal Aditanar Girls Higher Secondary School, Kayamozhi
- Five primary schools and three Anganwadi centres

=== Electricity ===
The Kayamozhi Electricity Board (EB) Office, located on Sadhukkai Street, provides electricity to Kayamozhi and nearby hamlets.

=== Finance and banking ===
- Tamil Nadu Mercantile Bank, Kayamozhi
- Kayamozhi Primary Agricultural Co-operative Society

=== Post offices ===
- Kayamozhi Sub Office (S.O.)
- Subramaniyapuram Sub Office (S.O.)

=== Health and welfare ===
- Government Primary Healthcare Centre and Hospital, Kayamozhi (near S. B. Aditanar Government Higher Secondary School)
- Government Boys' Hostel, Kayamozhi (behind S. B. Aditanar Government Higher Secondary School)
- Government Girls' Hostel, Kayamozhi (near the hospital)

=== Library ===
There are two public libraries, one located near S. B. Aditanar Government Higher Secondary School and another on Bazaar Street.

=== Ration shops ===
- Valluvar Nagar Ration Shop
- Kumarasamy Puram Ration Shop

=== Other services ===
- Electronic governance services: Kayamozhi e-Sevai Centre and Kayamozhi Co-operative Society
- Veterinary care: Veterinary Hospital, Kayamozhi

== Landmarks ==

Kayamozhi is bordered on the west by the Kayamozhi Red Sand Desert.

== Temples and places of worship ==
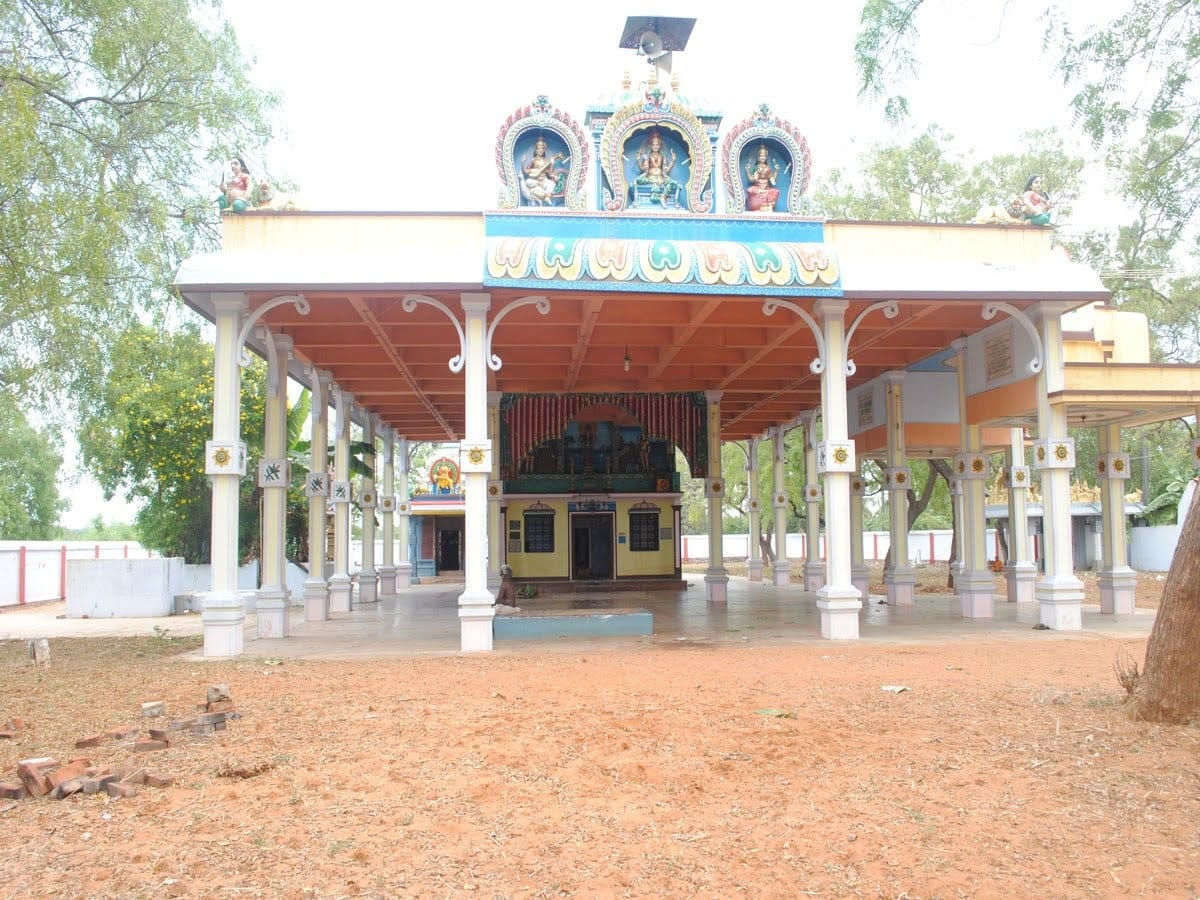

Kayamozhi and its surrounding hamlets have several notable temples, mosques, and churches. Important religious sites include:

Name	Location	Festival(s)	Notes
Arulmigu Muppudathi Amman Temple (அருள்மிகு முப்புடாதி அம்மன் கோவில்)	Ammankovil Street, south of Kayamozhi	Aadi Temple Festival (mid-August)	Mahakumbabishekam was performed in 2013.
Karkuvel Ayyanar Temple (கற்குவேல் அய்யனார் கோவில்)	Therikudieruppu, west of Kayamozhi	Kallar Vettu Festival (Karthigai 30 / Margazhi 1)	—
Vanangamudi Ayyanar and Ariyanachi Amman Temple (வணங்காமுடி அய்யனார் அரியணாச்சி அம்மன் கோவில்)	Therikudieruppu, west of Kayamozhi	Annual temple festival	—
Sri Thirumal Ayyanar Sri Muthu Mariamman Thirukovil (திருமால் அய்யனார் முத்து மாரியம்மன் திருக்கோவில்)	Therikudieruppu, west of Kayamozhi	Mahashivaratri (special pooja)	—
Karayadi Sudalai Madasamy Temple (காரையாடி சுடலைமாடசாமி கோவில்)	West of Kayamozhi	Festival on the first Tuesday of Purattasi (September)	—
Shri Mayandi Swamy Temple (மாயாண்டிசுவாமி கோவில்)	South of Kayamozhi	Festival on the first Friday of Aavani (August)	Believed to be about 100 years old.
Shri Oor Katha Perumal Swamy Temple (ஊர்காத்த பெருமாள் சுவாமி கோவில்)	Subramaniyapuram, northeast of Kayamozhi	Festival on the first Friday of Purattasi (September)	Temple is about 100 years old.
Sri Narayana Swamy Temple (நாராயண சாமி கோவில்)	Subramaniyapuram, northeast of Kayamozhi	Guru Pooja (May)	Temple is about 100 years old.
Manthira Moorthy Swamy Temple (மந்திர மூர்த்தி சுவாமி கோவில்)	Kumarasamy Puram, north of Kayamozhi	Festival on the first Tuesday of Thai (January)	Believed to be about 165 years old.
Sri Narayana Swamy Temple and Sri Aananda Parameshwarar Temple (நாராயண சாமி & ஆனந்த பரமேஸ்வரர் கோவில்)	Kumarasamy Puram, north of Kayamozhi	Guru Pooja (May), Maha Shivaratri, Paal Kudam	A brass Nataraja idol was reportedly discovered in 2012.
Arulmigu Sivananaindha Perumal Temple (சிவனனைந்த பெருமாள் கோவில்)	Kandasamy Puram, north of Kayamozhi	Temple festival	—
Arulmigu Narayanaswamy Temple (நாராயண சுவாமி கோவில்)	Kandasamy Puram, north of Kayamozhi	Guru Pooja	—
Jaria Masjid – Muhaideen Aandavar Masjid (ஜாரியா முகைதீன் ஆண்டவர் பள்ளிவாசல்)	Muslim Street, south of Kayamozhi	Kandhuri, Ramzan	—
Churches (திருச்சபை)	Therikudieruppu and Aarumugapuram	Christmas, Asanam festival	—

Shri Sudalaimadan Essaki Amman Temple avani 1st Tuesday festival

== Tourist spots ==
The following are some of the notable tourist attractions located in and around Kayamozhi:

S. No.	Nearest tourist spot	Location / Distance
1	Arulmigu Subramaniya Swamy Temple 1 2	Tiruchendur (12 km from Kayamozhi)
2	Tiruchendur Seashore	Tiruchendur (12 km from Kayamozhi)
3	Sri Mutharamman Temple 1 2	Kulasekharapatnam (15 km from Kayamozhi)
4	Kulasekharapatnam Beach	Kulasekharapatnam (15 km from Kayamozhi)
5	Karkuvel Ayyanar Temple 1 2	Therikudieruppu (2 km from Kayamozhi)
6	Arunchunai Kaatha Ayyanar Temple 1	Melaputhukudi (6 km from Kayamozhi)
7	Vanathirupathi Sri Nivasa Perumal Temple	Punnaiyadi / Punnai Nagar, Katchanavilai (9 km from Kayamozhi)
8	Manapad Church and Seashore	Manapad (18 km from Kayamozhi)
9	Kayalpatnam Mosque and Beach	Kayalpatnam (18 km from Kayamozhi)
10	Nava Thirupathi Temples	Thoothukudi and Tirunelveli districts
11	Nava Kailasam Temples	Thoothukudi and Tirunelveli districts

Indicates presence of a pond or beach.

== Notabilities ==
=== Notable persons ===
- S. B. Aditanar
- Sivanthi Aditanar – Founder of the Daily Thanthi newspaper

=== Notable events ===
- Scenes from Surya's Singam (2010) and Vijay's Villu (2009) were filmed in Kayamozhi. Scenes from Dhanush's Asuran (2019) and Vishal's Thaambirabharani (2007) were also shot here.
- Inauguration of the S. B. Aditanar statue and the P. Ramachandra Aditanar Memorial Hall.
