= Tamil nationalism =

Ideology based on a Tamil nation

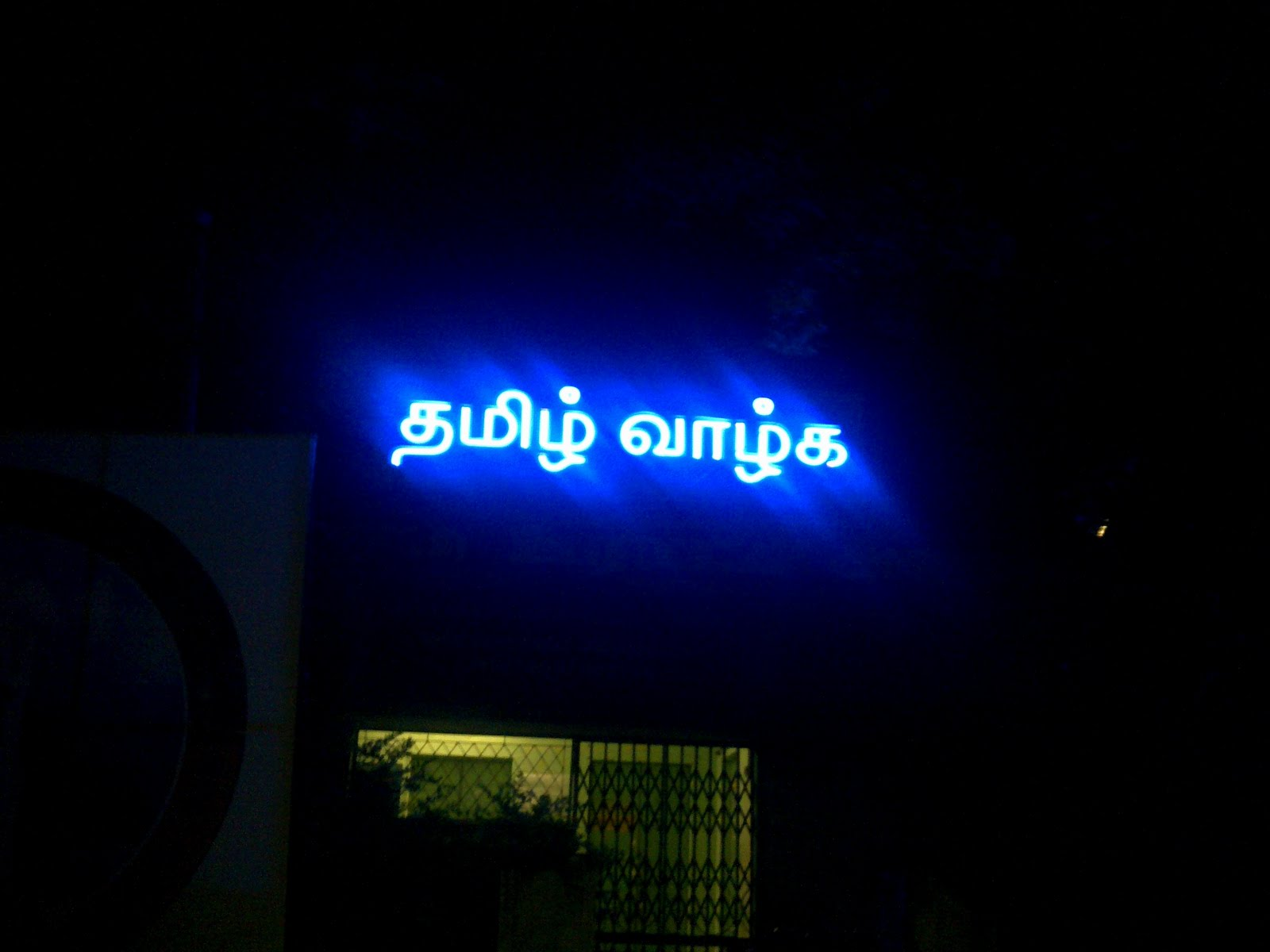
A lightboard that reads Long live Tamil (Tamil Valga in Tamil) outside a public building in Tamil Nadu.

Tamil nationalism is the ideology which asserts that the Tamil people constitute a nation and promotes the cultural unity of Tamil people. Tamil nationalism is primarily a secular nationalism, that focus on language and homeland. It expresses itself in the form of linguistic purism ("Pure Tamil"), linguistic nationalism, social equality ("Self-Respect Movement") and Tamil Renaissance.

Since the independence of India and Sri Lanka, Tamil separatist movements have been actively suppressed in both countries.

== Sri Lanka ==
Since the adoption of the Vaddukoddai Resolution in 1976 under the leadership of S.J.V. Chelvanayakam, Tamil nationalists in Sri Lanka have repeatedly attempted to create an independent state (Tamil Eelam) amid the increasing political and physical violence against ordinary Tamils by the Sri Lankan government which was dominated by Sinhalese Buddhist nationalism.

Shortly after the island's independence from Britain, the Sri Lankan government passed the Citizenship Act of 1948, which made more than a million Tamils of Indian origin stateless. The government also passed a Sinhala Only Act, which severely threatened the status of Tamil as a minority language, as well as hindering the social mobility of Tamil speakers.. In addition, the government also initiated the state-sponsored colonisation schemes, with the aim of lessening the numerical presence of minorities as well as monopolising traditionally shared economic activities such as agriculture and fisheries, which have been part of the livelihood of Sri Lankan Tamils since time immemorial.

After anti-Tamil pogroms in 1956, 1958 and 1977 and police brutality against Tamils protesting against these acts, guerilla groups like Liberation Tigers of Tamil Eelam (LTTE) were created to safeguard the interest and rights of Tamils in their own land. The burning of Jaffna library in 1981 and Black July in 1983 finally led to over 25 years of war between the Sri Lankan army and the Tamil Tigers. Persistent use of violence, including assassinations, led the LTTE to be declared as a terrorist organization by India, Malaysia, the European Union, Canada, and the United states. The civil war came to an end in 2009 with the military defeat of LTTE and the death of its leader, Prabhakaran. The Sri Lankan civil war led to death of over 100,000 people according to the United Nations. The Sri Lankan Government are alleged to have committed war crimes against the civilian Sri Lankan Tamil people during the final months of the Eelam War IV phase in 2009. A PPT verdict declared it as a genocide committed against ethnic Tamils by the Sri Lanka, government. Following the conclusion of the Civil War, the Tamil National Alliance (TNA) dropped their demand for an independent Tamil Eelam in favour of regional autonomy in a remerged North Eastern Province. The idea of Federalism in Sri Lanka is opposed by the Sri Lankan Government, which prefers a unitary state.

In 2010, the Transnational Government of Tamil Eelam (TGTE) was founded by Visvanathan Rudrakumaran who aim to create an independent Tamil Eelam in peaceful democratic means. The Tamil People's Council (TPC) led by chief minister C. V. Vigneswaran organized "Eluga Tamil" ("Arise, Tamils") rally in northern Jaffna and eastern Batticaloa to address that Tamil rights are still refused by Sri Lankan Government.

== India ==
Indian Tamil Nationalism comprises the vast majority of Dravidian Nationalism which consisted of all the four major Dravidian languages in South India. Dravidian Nationalism was popularised by a series of small movements and organisations who contended that the South Indians composed a cultural entity that was different from the Indo-Aryans of North India. A new morphed ideology of Dravidian nationalism gained momentum within the Tamil speakers during the 1930s and 1950s. Dravidian nationalism failed to find support outside of Tamil Nadu. During the 1950s and 1960s, the Nationalist ideologies lead to the argument by Tamil leaders that, at a minimum, that Tamils must have self-determination or, at maximum, secession from India. By the late 1960, the political parties who were espousing Dravidian ideologies gained power only within the state of Tamil Nadu.

Since the 1967 election victory of Dravida Munnetra Kazhagam (DMK) under C N Annadurai, Tamil nationalism has been a permanent feature of the government of Tamil Nadu. The DMK came to power positively on the plank of opposing Hindi monopoly/imposition. Prior to coming to power, they also openly declared to fight for Tamil independence from India. But since the Indian government had added a new legislation that outlawed anyone wanting independence from India, under the sedition act, and that made political parties to lose their right to stand in election, the DMK dropped this demand. With this, the drive for secession became weaker with most mainstream political parties, except a few, who instead committed to development of Tamil Nadu within a united India. Most major Tamil Nadu regional parties such as DMK, All India Anna Dravida Munnetra Kazhagam (AIADMK), Viduthalai Chiruthaigal Katchi (VCK), Pattali Makkal Katchi (PMK) and Marumalarchi Dravida Munnetra Kazhagam (MDMK) frequently participate as coalition partners of other pan-Indian parties in the Union Government of India at New Delhi.

=== Tamil secessionist and militants groups ===
In 1958, S. P. Adithanar founded the "We Tamils" party who supported the creation of a homogeneous Greater Tamil Nadu incorporating Tamil speaking areas of India and Sri Lanka. In 1960, the party organized a statewide protest which demanded the establishment of a sovereign Tamil Nadu. During the protest maps of Republic of India (with Tamil Nadu left out) were burnt. The We Tamils party lost the elections of 1962 and was merged in 1967 with the DMK. The outbreak of the Sri Lankan civil war between the Majority Sinhalese and indigenous Tamils lead the Tamil nationalism in India to take a new shape. In India small Tamil militant groups emerged such as Tamil Nadu Liberation Army led by Thamizharasan, who aspired to an independent Tamil Nadu. After his death, the group is believed to have splintered into factions. The TNLA was banned by the Government of India. Another banned Tamil secessionist group in India was the Tamil National Retrieval Troops (TNRT) founded by P. Ravichandran in the late-1980s. TNRT, a Tamil Nationalist organization, fought for an independent Tamil homeland and followed the goal to unite Tamil Nadu and Tamil Eelam to be a Greater Tamil Nation.

=== Support for Sri Lankan Tamils ===
In October 2008, amid intensified in shelling on Tamil civilian areas by the Sri Lankan military, with the army moving in on the LTTE and the navy battling the latter's sea patrol, Indian Tamil MP's, including those supporting the Singh government in the DMK and PMK, threatened to resign en masse if the Indian government did not pressure the Lankan government to cease firing on civilians. In response, the Indian government reported it had upped the ante on the Lankan government to ease tensions.

K. Muthukumar, a Tamil journalist and activist in Tamil Nadu committed suicide, because the government failed to save Sri Lankan Tamils. His death instantly triggered widespread strikes, demonstrations and public unrest in Tamil Nadu. There is also deep resentment against India among some Tamils, that it aided the Sri Lankan state in the 2009 genocide. This led to minor incidents like Tamil nationalists turning out in support of the Eelam rebels when Chennai-based The Hindu was alleged to have been supporting the Government of Sri Lanka. Editor-in-Chief of The Hindu, N Ram named members of the Periyar Dravidar Kazhagam, Thamizh Thesiya Periyakkam, some lawyers, and law college students as responsible for incidents of vandalism at their offices.

The Tamil nationalist party Naam Tamilar Katchi arose 18 May 2010 as a result of the bloody end of the Sri Lankan civil war. Main agenda of this party is the liberation of Tamil Eelam, here only Tamils should rule in Tamil Nadu and to spread the importance of Tamil language and unity of Tamils, irrespective of religion and caste.

2013 it came to series of Anti-Sri Lanka protests initiated by the Students Federation for Freedom of Tamil Eelam. The students demanded justice for Sri Lankan Tamils and a UN referendum on the formation of Tamil Eelam. Tamil organizations, parties and the Chief Minister of Tamil Nadu demand an International Investigation of Sri Lankan war crimes and a UN referendum among Sri Lankan Tamils on the formation of Tamil Eelam.

=== Protests against Jallikattu ban ===
The ban on Jallikattu was seen by Tamils as an attack on their culture and identity. In 2017, it came to a statewide pro-jallikattu protests in Indian state of Tamil Nadu, which lasted several days. Tamils from all over the world expressed their solidarity with the protesters in Tamil Nadu. The government claimed that anti-national elements would be among the protesters who raised slogans for a separate Tamil Nadu and against India The Tamil rapper Hiphop Tamizha distanced himself from the protest, because he felt uncomfortable with the anti-national and secessionist elements in the protests. Tamil cinema actor turned politician Kamal Haasan claimed that seeking a separate country for Tamils is not anti-national and that many political leaders have done so in the past.

=== Demand for state flag ===
Officially Tamil Nadu does not have its own state flag and a flag like the Kannada flag of Karnataka is proposed for Tamil Nadu by various Tamil nationalists. Thanthai Periyar Dravidar Kazhagam and Naam Tamilar Katchi each hoisted different self-proclaimed Tamil Nadu flags on 1 November 2020 Tamil Nadu Day. The police warned and booked members for violating the Indian constitution by raising an unofficial flag for Tamil Nadu proceeded by Naam Tamilar Katchi among the public.

=== 2022 response to Amit Shah's Hindi unity proposal ===
On 3 July 2022, as a response to Indian Home Minister Amit Shah's Hindi proposal to be the nationwide link language, DMK politician A. Raja said that the Union government is not giving the state autonomy and the Prime Minister and the Home Minister should not force them into demanding a "thani nadu" (separate nation) while speaking at a meeting held for DMK local body representatives, in the presence of Chief Minister M K Stalin.

“Prime Minister Narendra Modi says all states are to be seen the same, and Home Minister Amit Shah says if you want unity, learn Hindi. The party’s founding father Periyar, until [his] death, demanded a thani nadu. But we (DMK) kept aside that demand for our democracy and national integrity, So, I am saying this with the utmost humility. Our CM is travelling in Anna’s [C. N. Annadurai] path so far, do not push us into following Periyar’s path. Do not make us revive our demand for a separate state”

DMK immediately distanced itself from the comments and said that the comments made in support of a separate nation is not the stand of the party. Tamil Nadu BJP chief K. Annamalai even opposed Amit Shah's Hindi push.

== Linguistic purism ==
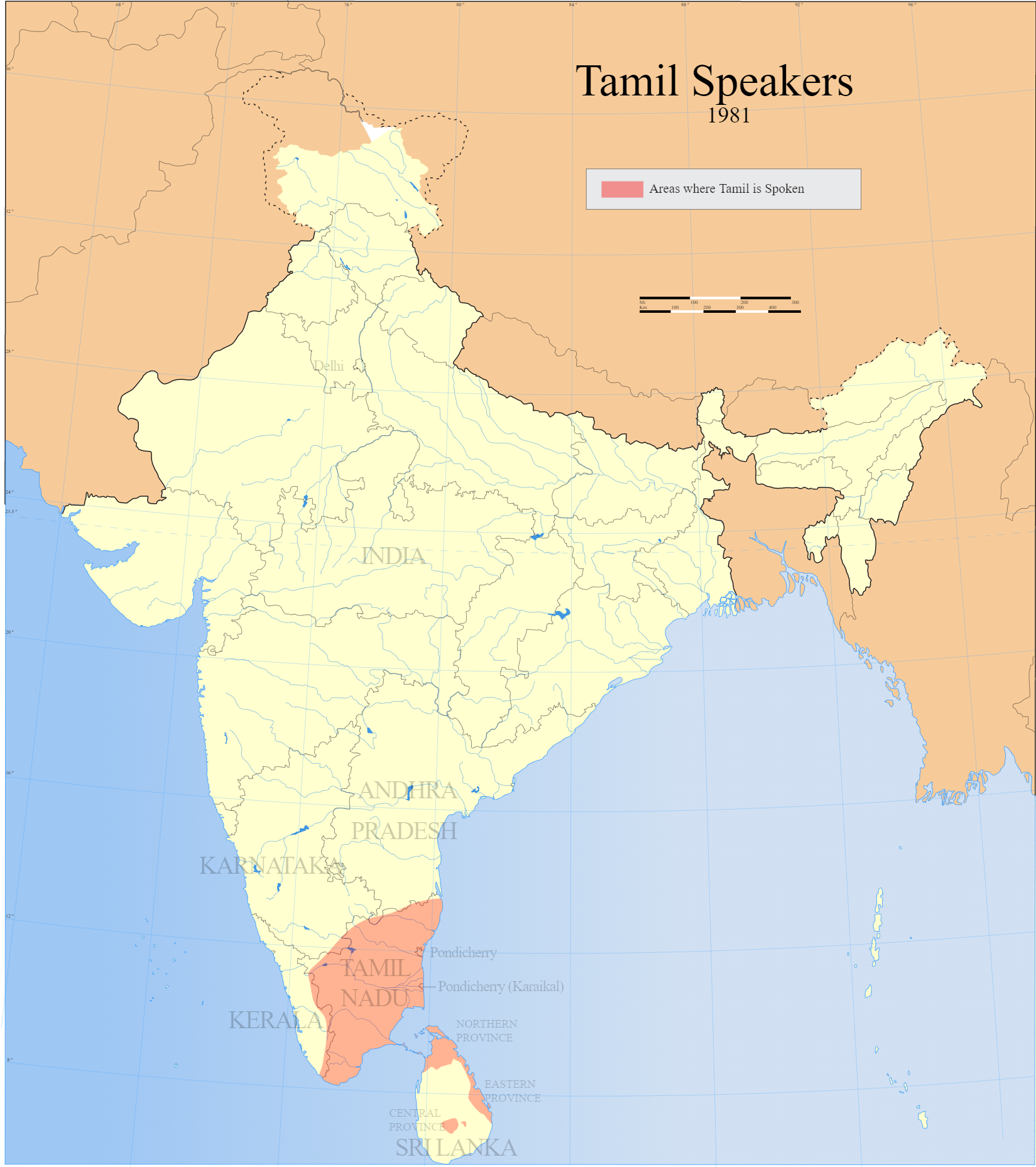
Distribution of Tamil speakers in South India and Sri Lanka (1981).

=== History ===
The anti-Hindi agitation was a form of resistance to the imposition of the Hindi language throughout India. C. Rajagopalachari (Rajaji) tried to impose Hindi as the national language, with Hindi taught in all Indian schools. This move was opposed by Periyar, who started an agitation that lasted for about three years. The agitation involved fasts, conferences, marches, picketing and protests. The government responded with a crackdown resulting in the death of two protesters and the arrest of 1,198 persons including women and children. The Congress Government of the Madras State, called in paramilitary forces to quell the agitation; their involvement resulted in the deaths of about seventy persons (by official estimates) including two policemen. Several Tamil leaders supported the continuation of the usage of English as the official language of India. To calm the situation, Indian Prime Minister Lal Bahadur Shastri gave assurances that English would continue to be used as the official language as long the non-Hindi speaking states wanted. The riots subsided after Shastri's assurance, as did the student agitation.

Four states – Bihar, Uttar Pradesh, Madhya Pradesh and Rajasthan- have been granted the right to conduct proceedings in their High Courts in their official language, which, for all of them, was Hindi. However, the only non-Hindi state to seek a similar power – Tamil Nadu, which sought the right to conduct proceedings in Tamil in its High Court – had its application rejected by the central government earlier, which said it was advised to do so by the Supreme Court. In 2006, the law ministry said that it would not object to Tamil Nadu state's desire to conduct Madras High Court proceedings in Tamil. In 2010, the Chief Justice of the Madras High Court allowed lawyers to argue cases in Tamil ...

=== Basis in pre-modern literature ===
Although nationalism itself is a modern phenomenon, the expression of linguistic identity found in the modern Pure Tamil movement has pre-modern antecedents, in a "loyalty to Tamil" (as opposed to Sanskrit) visible in ancient Sangam literature. The poems of Sangam literature imply a consciousness of independence or separateness from neighbouring regions. Similarly, Silappadhikaaram, a post-Sangam epic, posits cultural integrity for the entire Tamil region and has been interpreted by Parthasarathy as presenting "an expansive vision of the Tamil imperium" which "speaks for all Tamils." Subrahmanian sees in the epic the first expression of Tamil nationalism, while Parthasarathy says that the epic shows "the beginnings of Tamil separatism."

Medieval Tamil texts also demonstrate features of modern Tamil linguistic purism, most notably the claim of parity of status with Sanskrit which was traditionally seen in the rest of the Indian subcontinent as being a prestigious, trans-local language. Texts on prosody and poetics such as the 10th century Yaapparungalakkaarihai and the 11th century Vīrasōḻiyam, for example, treat Tamil as the equal of Sanskrit in terms of literary prestige, and use the rhetorical device of describing Tamil as a beautiful young lady and as a pure, divine language both of which are also central in modern Tamil nationalism. Vaishnavite and Shaivite commentators took the claim of divinity one step further, claiming for Tamil a liturgical status, and seeking to endow Tamil texts with the status of a "fifth Veda." Vaishnavite commentators such as Nanjiyar went one step further, declaring that people who were not Tamil lamented the fact that they were not born in a place where such a wonderful language was spoken. This trend was not universal, and there were also authors who sought to argue and work against Tamil distinctiveness through, amongst other things, Sanskritisation.

== See also ==
- Dravida Nadu
- Perunchithiranar
- Politics of Tamil Nadu
- Veerappan
- Separatism in India
