= Nellai Maalai Murasu =

Newspaper in India

Nellai Maalai Murasu நெல்லை மாலை முரசு
- Type: Daily Evening newspaper
- Format: Broadsheet
- Owner: Thanthi Trust
- Founder: m. Lokesh
- Language: Tamil

Nellai Maalai Murasu (Tamil: நெல்லை மாலை முரசு) is a daily evening Tamil newspaper in Nellai, India.

It is owned by Malar Publications Ltd, a member of the Daily Thanti group. It was founded by S. P. Adithanar and the current director is Sivanthi Adithan.

== Notes ==
- Not to be confused with Malai Murasu (Tamil: மாலைமுரசு), a similar evening newspaper in Tamil Nadu.
