= Cristina Kathirvelan =

Indian Tamil-language love drama action film

- Directed by: Sjn Alex Pandian
- Written by: Sjn Alex Pandian
- Produced by: Dr. R. Prabhakar Sthapathy
- Starring: Kaushik Ram; Pratibha; Singam Puli; Aarul D Shankar; Kanja Karupu; Jayakumar
- Cinematography: Prahath Muniyasami
- Edited by: Lokeshwar
- Music by: Nr. Raghunanthan
- Production company: Sri Lakshmi Dream Factory
- Distributed by: Mr Delta Creations
- Release date: 7 November 2025
- Country: India
- Language: Tamil

Cristina Kathirvelan is an Indian Tamil-language love drama action film written and directed by Sjn Alex Pandian. The film is produced by Dr. R. Prabhakar Sthapathy under the banner Sri Lakshmi Dream Factory. It stars Kaushik Ram, Pratibha, Singam Puli, Aarul D Shankar, Kanja Karupu, and Jayakumar in major roles.

The film is scheduled to be released on 7 November 2025.

== Cast ==
- Kaushik Ram
- Pratibha
- Singam Puli
- Aarul D Shankar
- Kanja Karupu
- Jayakumar

== Production ==
The film is written and directed by Sjn Alex Pandian.It is produced by Dr. R. Prabhakar Sthapathy under the banner Sri Lakshmi Dream Factory.Cinematography is handled by Prahath Muniyasami, and the editing is done by Lokeshwar. The music for the film is composed by Nr. Raghunanthan.

== Reception ==
A Maalai Malar critic wrote that "The film is interesting in the second half and sentimental in the climax."

A Dinakaran critic stated that "Editor Lokeshwar's work is also commendable. Although this is an old romantic genre, director Alex Pandian, who has changed the climax and attracted attention, has approached many scenes superficially."
