= Greater Tamil Nadu =

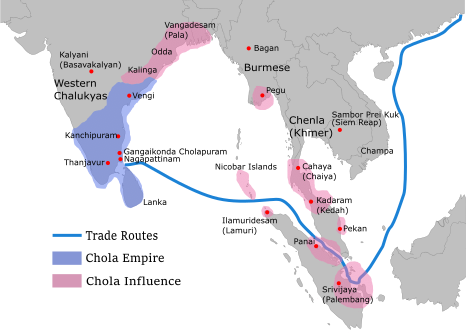
All Tamil territories on Island and Mainland united under the rule of Rajendra Chola I c.1030

Greater Tamil Nadu is a nationalist and reunification concept of Tamil nationalism that centers on forming a national homeland for the Tamils by merging the Tamil speaking areas of India proper (the "mainland") and Sri Lanka (the "island"). However such areas also include not only Tamils but also many other ethnic groups like Malayalis, Kannadigas, Telugus and Sinhalese. Greater Tamil Nadu was proposed by various Tamil groups such as Naam Tamilar led by S. P. Adithanar in 1958 and the Tamil Nadu Liberation Front (TNLF) and the Tamil National Retrieval Troops (TNRT) in the late-1980s.

First Unification of all Tamil speaking land under single rule was under emperor Raja raja chola and again unified during the rule of emperor Jatavarman Sundara Pandyan I and lasted till emperor Maravarman Kulasekara Pandyan I

== Colonial background ==
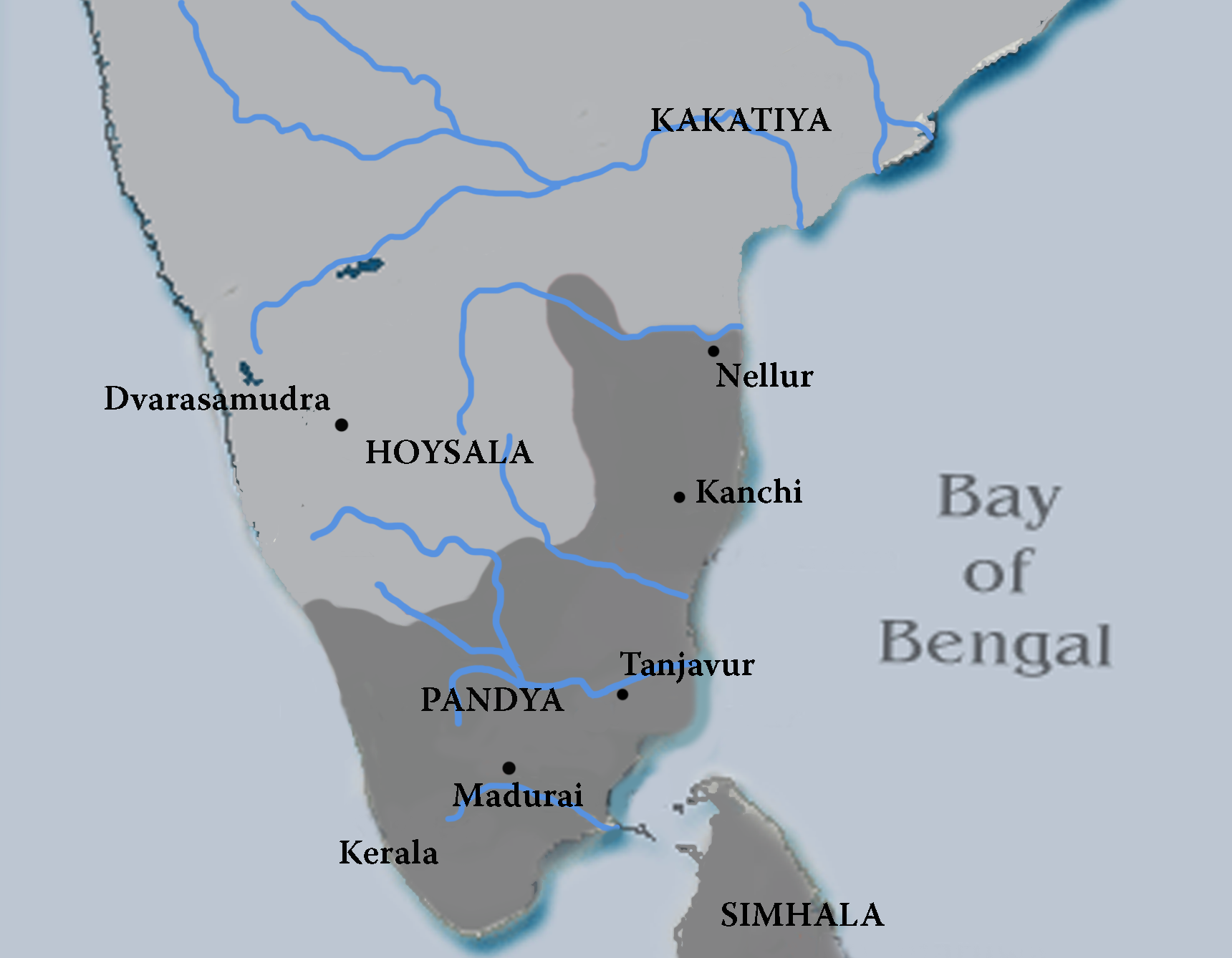
The maximum extent of the Pandyan empire c.1279, which covers Tamil speaking areas on present-day India proper and the island of Sri Lanka.

During the Colonial period, the British conquered Tamil territories and ends Tamil sovereignty on both side of Palk Strait. The Tamil areas on mainland became Madras Presidency and part of British India. The Tamil areas on island were merged with Sinhalese areas to form British Ceylon. The British colonist operated British India and British Ceylon as separate colonies, laying so the foundations for two nations. After Sri Lanka and India achieved independence, Tamil peoples were separated by newly established national borders and became citizens of the respective nations.

== See also ==
- Sri Lankan Tamil nationalism
