= Naam Tamilar Katchi =

Indian political party

- Abbreviation: NTK
- Leader: Seeman
- Founder: S. P. Adithanar
- Founded: 1958
- Headquarters: Porur, Chennai
- Youth wing: Muthukumar Youth Wing
- Women's wing: Senkodi Women's Wing
- Ideology: Tamil nationalism Regionalism; Environmentalism
- Political position: Syncretic
- Colours: Red
- ECI status: State party
- Seats in Rajya Sabha: 0 / 245
- Seats in Lok Sabha: 0 / 543
- Seats in Tamil Nadu Legislative Assembly: 0 / 234
- Seats in Puducherry Legislative Assembly: 0 / 33
- Number of states and union territories in government: 0 / 31

Election symbol
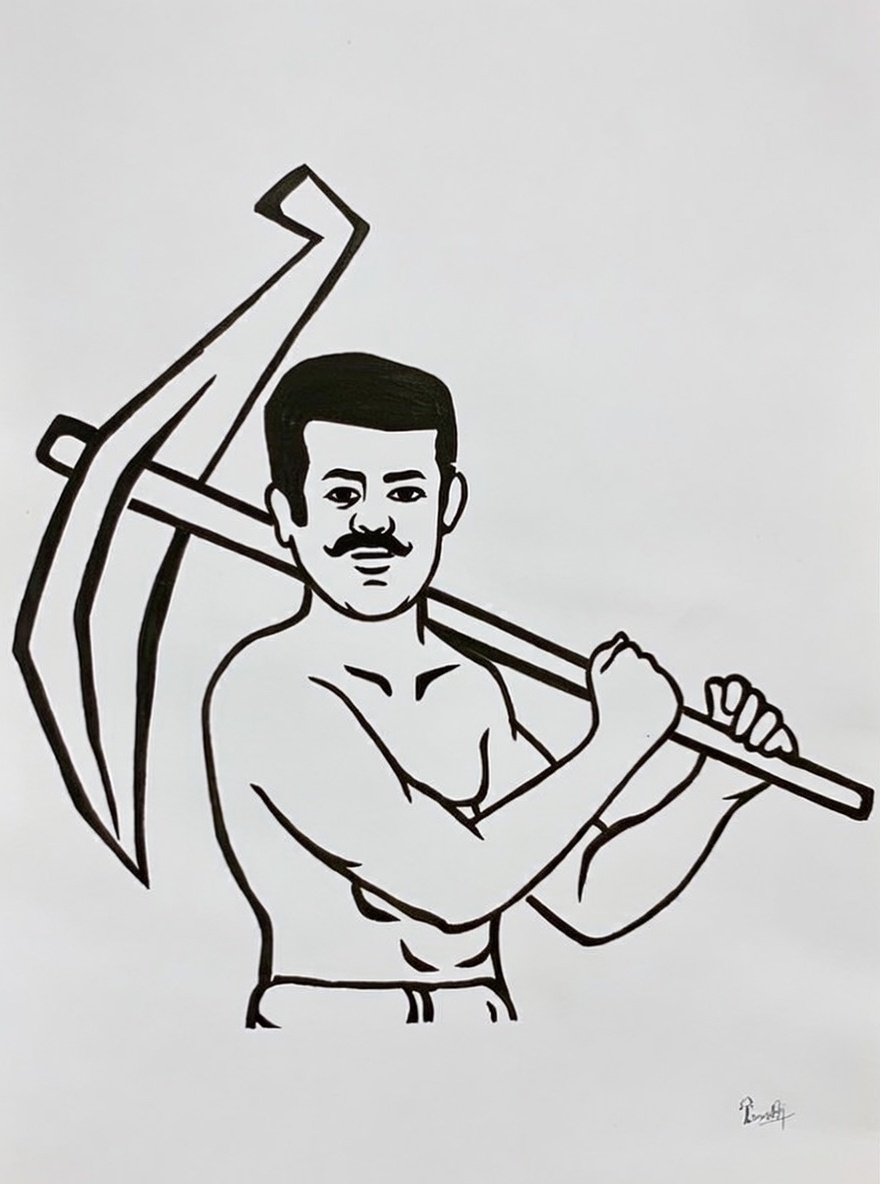

Website
- naamtamilar.org

Naam Tamilar Katchi (NTK; lit. 'We are Tamils Party') is a Tamil nationalist political party that is active in the Indian state of Tamil Nadu and the union territory of Puducherry. Founded in 1958, it is currently led by actor-turned-politician Seeman. It is recognised as a state party by the Election Commission of India.

== History ==
We Tamils party was founded by S. P. Adithanar in 1958 on the platform of Tamil nationalism. In 1960, the party organised statewide protests in favour of the establishment of a separate Tamil country. The party, along with M. P. Sivagnanam's Tamil Arasu Kazhagam, was involved in the campaign to change the name of the state from Madras State to Tamil Nadu. Adithanar lost the 1962 election from Tiruchendur He was later elected to the Madras Legislative Council in 1964. The party contested in the 1967 election as a part of the coalition led by the Dravida Munnetra Kazhagam (DMK) under the DMK's "Rising Sun" symbol. Four members of the party were elected to the Assembly, including Adithanar, who won from Srivaikuntam. Later that year, Adithanar disbanded the party and joined the DMK.

On 18 May 2010, on the first anniversary of the formation of the Naam Tamilar Iyakkam (We Tamils Movement), Seeman announced the formation of the Naam Tamilar Katchi (NTK), in a revival of the We Tamils party. Seeman reiterated that the party was a revival of S. P. Adithanar original party. He further said that party would be an alternative party to mainstream political parties in Tamil Nadu, and advocated for the establishment of an independent Tamil Eelam in Sri Lanka. The party launched its flag in 2014, with a leaping tiger insignia. It was recognised as a state party by the Election Commission of India in May 2025.

== Policies and views ==
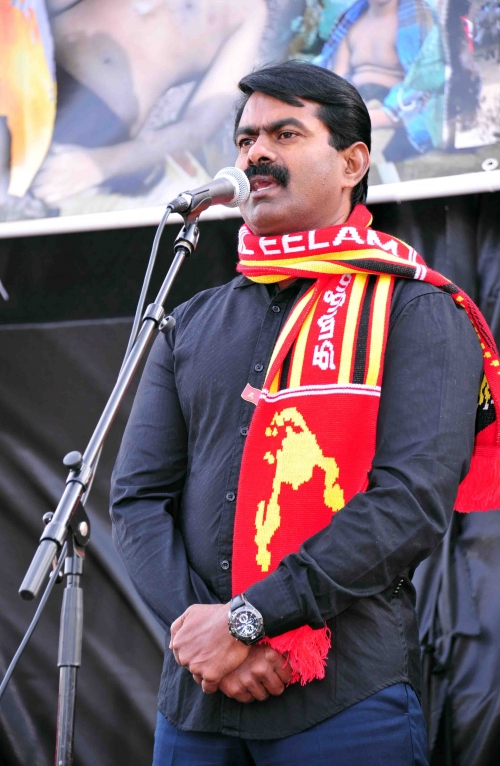
Seeman is the leader of Naam Tamilar Katchi

=== Tamil identity and rule ===
The NTK denies the Dravidian identity of the Tamils, and advocates for Tamils to identity solely based on the language. It emphasises Tamil rule of Tamil-majority areas, opposing the Dravidian parties which it claims to have contributed to the downfall of the Tamils. According to the party, anyone has right to live in Tamil Nadu but only a Tamil has the right to govern the state as chief minister. Seeman justified his statement by stating that most of the former chief ministers of Tamil Nadu were not Tamils by origin. Though his statement was criticised by the Dravidian parties as racist, and he was accused of identity politics and creating ethnic divisions, he found support from some including Bharathiraja and Sarath Kumar. In an interview, Seeman later said that only who support the Tamils' basic rights, those who oppose suppression of his dignity and those who stand against the humiliation of Tamils are true Tamils. The statement drew criticism from film director Ameer.

=== Sri Lankan Tamils ===
The NTK supports the cause of Tamil Eelam, a proposed independent Tamil state comprising parts of the north and eastern regions of Sri Lanka. The party idolises Velupillai Prabhakaran, the founder of the Liberation Tigers of Tamil Eelam (LTTE), a Tamil militant organisation. After the defeat of the LTTE in 2009, the party still advocated for the creation of an independent Tamil state and the fulfillment of Tamil rights in the island nation. It appealed to the United Nations Human Rights Council for the serving of justice to the Sri Lankan Tamils, who faced several war crimes during the war with the Sri Lankan Armed Forces. The party has highlighted the plight of the Sri Lankan Tamils, who had come to India as refugees, and appealed for the granting of Indian citizenship to them and the cessation of hostilities against them by the authorities.

Seeman has also called for the retrieval of Katchatheevu, an island of Sri Lanka, whose sovereignty of the island was recognised by India in 1974 after a prolonged dispute. As the island disadvantaged the fishermen and led to frequent clashes with the Sri Lankan forces, he said that he would reclaim the island by arming fishermen, which resulted in sedition charges filed against him.

=== Law and order ===
Seeman has often criticised the deterioration in law and order in the state. He has also said that the party abhors violence in any form and cadres who violate its principles of conduct would be punished.

NTK has supported commuting the death sentences and releasing those convicted in the assassination of Rajiv Gandhi. Seeman said that the party's stance was not limited to the case, but for the complete abolition of the death penalty in India. It has also called for the humanitarian release of prisoners jailed for more than ten years.

=== Others ===
NTK strongly advocates for equal representation of women in all areas. The party has often allocated half of the seats it contested in the elections to women. It also supports LGBTQ rights, and fielded a transgender candidate in the 2016 assembly elections.

The party has launched several demonstrations demanding Tamil Nadu's share of water from the Kaveri River and Mullaperiyar Dam from upstream states. Seeman has criticised the illegal sand mining of the state's riverbeds.

In 2012, the central government was considering disinvestment of Neyveli Lignite Corporation (NLC), a government-owned company. The NLC employees organised a strike against the government's decision, and the NTK supported their cause, with Seeman saying that the Tamil strikers were experiencing discrimination from non-Tamil management. He also criticised the NLC for investing in other Indian states during an acute power shortage in Tamil Nadu.

In July 2018, the NTK organised protests against the proposed Chennai-Salem expressway project. According to the party, the project would be a disaster for the region's fragile ecology and would enable mining companies to illegally mine valuable minerals in the Kalrayan and Servarayan Hills on the expressway's proposed path. The Madras High Court later quashed the government order to acquire land for the project.

== Elections ==
=== 2011 Tamil Nadu Assembly election ===
The NTK contested the elections for the first time in the 2011 Tamil Nadu Legislative Assembly election. It campaigned against the Indian National Congress-led United Progressive Alliance, holding it responsible for the deaths of Sri Lankan Tamils during the Eelam War and its anti-Tamil policies.

=== 2016 Tamil Nadu Assembly election ===
The NTK contested in all the 234 constituencies in Tamil Nadu and in the districts of Puducherry and Karaikal. The Election Commission of India allocated 'twin candles' as the party's symbol for the elections. The party received 458,104 votes (1.1 percent) and did not win any seats.

=== 2017 R. K. Nagar by-election ===
The NTK fielded K. Kalaikottudhayam as its candidate for the 2017 R. K. Nagar by-election, necessitated by the death of J. Jayalalithaa In a pre-poll survey by Puthiya Thalaimurai TV, NTK received 11.72% of votes when surveyed as to the best alternative party to the Dravida Munnetra Kazhagam and All India Anna Dravida Munnetra Kazhagam. After the by-elections was not held as planned on 12 April, because of allegations of bribery and corruption, Seeman expressed his dissatisfaction with democracy in India, saying that it was unfair of the Election Commission to stop the elections, rather than disqualifying the parties involved in bribery. The election was held on 21 December 2017, and NTK finished fourth, with 3,802 votes.

=== 2019 Indian general election ===
In the 2019 Indian general election, the NTK contested all 39 constituencies in Tamil Nadu and the single seat in Puducherry. It allocated half of the seats to women candidates. The party received 1,645,185 votes, which was about 3.1% of the total votes. It received 84,855 votes in the Sriperumbudur constituency, the party's highest vote count in a single seat in the election.

=== 2021 Tamil Nadu Assembly election ===
In the 2021 assembly elections, the party contested in all 234 assembly constituencies in Tamil Nadu. The party again allocated half of the seats to women, and Seeman introduced the candidates on 7 March 2021. Seeman contested from the Thiruvottiyur constituency, and placed third with 24.4% votes.

=== 2026 Tamil Nadu Assembly election ===
In December 2025, the party announced that it will contest solo across all the constituencies in Tamil Nadu in the 2026 Tamil Nadu Legislative Assembly election, and released its first list of candidates.

== Electoral performance ==
=== Lok Sabha Elections ===
Lok Sabha elections
Year	Party leader	Seats won	Change in seats	Popular vote	Percentage of votes	Vote Swing	Outcome
Tamil Nadu
2019	Seeman	0 / 39	Steady	1,668,079	3.91%	Steady	Lost
2024	Seeman	0 / 39	Steady	3,560,485	8.19%	▲4.28%	Lost
Puducherry
2019	Seeman	0 / 1	Steady	22,857	2.89%	Steady	Lost
2024	Seeman	0 / 1	Steady	39,603	4.90%	▲2.01%	Lost

==== Bye Elections ====
Year	Constituency Name	Popular Votes	Percentage of Votes	Vote Swing	Outcome
Tamil Nadu
2021	Kanniyakumari	58,593	5.34%	▲3.71%	Lost

=== Legislative Assembly Elections ===
Year	Party leader	Seats won	Change in seats	Popular vote	Percentage of votes	Vote Swing	Outcome
Tamil Nadu
2016	Seeman	0 / 234	Steady	458,007	1.06%	Steady	Lost
2021	Seeman	0 / 234	Steady	3,067,458	6.89%	▲5.83%	Lost
2026	Seeman	0 / 234	Steady	1,972,537	4.00%	▼2.89%	Lost
Puducherry
2016	Seeman	0 / 30	Steady	3,888	0.47%	Steady	Lost
2021	Seeman	0 / 30	Steady	28,189	3.37%	▲2.9%	Lost
2026	Seeman	0 / 30	Steady	11,813	1.36%	▼2.01%	Lost

==== Bye Elections ====
Year	Constituency Name	Popular Votes	Percentage of Votes	Vote Swing	Outcome
Tamil Nadu
2017	RK Nagar	3,802	2.15%	▲0.71%	Lost
2019	Poonamallee	10,871	4.24%	▲3.17%	Lost
2019	Perambur	8,611	4.56%	▲2.84%	Lost
2019	Thiruporur	9,910	4.56%	▲3.65%	Lost
2019	Sholingur	5,188	4.56%	▲4.1%	Lost
2019	Gudiyatham	4,670	2.29%	▲1.85%	Lost
2019	Ambur	3,127	1.81%	▲1.45%	Lost
2019	Hosur	6,740	2.95%	▲1.96%	Lost
2019	Pappireddipatti	3,783	1.76%	▲1.48%	Lost
2019	Harur	3,902	1.98%	▲1.65%	Lost
2019	Nilakottai	4,934	2.7%	▲2.01%	Lost
2019	Tiruvarur	8,144	3.95%	▲3.23%	Lost
2019	Thanjavur	11,182	5.83%	▲5.2%	Lost
2019	Manamadurai	9,315	4.73%	▲3.12%	Lost
2019	Andipatti	5,810	2.54%	▲1.88%	Lost
2019	Periyakulam	5,825	2.96%	▲2.42%	Lost
2019	Paramakudi	6,710	3.81%	▲2.24%	Lost
2019	Vilathikulam	4,628	2.93%	▲1.77%	Lost
2019	Aravakurichi	2,227	1.29%	▲0.81%	Lost
2019	Thiruparankundram	5,467	2.42%	New	Lost
2019	Sattur	5,004	2.76%	▲1.90%	Lost
2019	Ottapidaram	8,666	5.09%	▲2.73%	Lost
2019	Sulur	4,335	1.93%	▲0.58%	Lost
2019	Vikravandi	2,921	1.55%	▲0.97%	Lost
2019	Nanguneri	3,494	2.05%	▲0.7%	Lost
2023	Erode East	10,827	6.35%	▼1.30%	Lost
2024	Vilavancode	8,150	5.08%	▼2.24%	Lost
2024	Vikravandi	10,602	5.40%	▲1.13%	Lost
2025	Erode East	24,151	15.59%	▲9.24%	Lost
