= Madras Manade =

Movement

Madras Manade was a movement launched by the Telugu people (Andhras) residing in Madras to create a separate state for their community with Madras (now known as Chennai) as its capital city.

Though the demand for a separate state existed as far back as 1913 (and possibly earlier), it gained momentum in the 1940s and 1950s. There were continuous demonstrations, strikes, etc. Telugu leaders like Tanguturi Prakasam, Tenneti Viswanatham, Bulusu Sambamurti, Neelam Sanjiva Reddy, Veeresalingam Pantulu and Bhogaraju Pattabhi Sitaramayya led the agitation. The efforts were unsuccessful. They popularized the slogan 'Madrasu Manade'(మద్రాసు మనదే, Madras is ours). Tamils opposed the inclusion of Madras.It was during this time, the Telugu leaders launched Madras Manade(Madras is ours, in Telugu) movement. Countering this, another movement was launched in Tamil Nadu by the organisation Tamil Arasu Kazhagam. It was called Madras Namade(Madras is ours, in Tamil). The Tamil Arasu Kazhagam under the leadership of its founder organised various protests and rally against annexing Madras with Andhra.

== J.V.P. Committee ==
The J.V.P. Committee took its name from its members Jawaharlal Nehru, Vallabhbhai Patel and Bhogaraju Pattabhi Sitaramayya. The Committee reported to the Working Committee of the Indian National Congress in April, 1949, recommending that the creation of linguistic provinces be postponed. However, it suggested that Andhra Province could be formed, provided the Andhras gave up their claim to the city of Madras. This report provoked violent reaction in Andhra as the Telugus were not prepared to forgo their claims. The two alternative political solutions suggested by Andhra leaders were to make Madras as joint capital of Andhra and Madras States or to divide the City, allowing the areas north of the river Cooum going to Andhra and areas south of the river going to Madras states, which did not find favour with Tamils or central leaders. C. Rajagopalachari, the then chief minister of Madras province, did not support Madras moving to Andhra State. On the Tamil peoples' side M. P. Sivagnanam (ம.பொ.சி) leader of a Tamil organization called Tamil Arasu Kazhagam agitated against Telugus' claim organising rallies, meetings and dharnas etc., saying தலை கொடுத்தேனும் தலைநகரைக் காப்போம், வேங்கடத்தை விடமாட்டோம் (We will protect and save the capital for Tamils even if we have to part with our heads, We will not give up our claim over Tirupati).

== Outcome ==
At this stage Potti Sreeramulu, a freedom fighter, embarked on a fatal fast, demanding a Telugu state including Madras. Ongoing violent agitation compelled the creation of the separate Andhra State with eleven Telugu majority districts and three taluks of Bellary district. Kurnool was made the capital after Telugu leaders were convinced to give up their claim over Madras City. The new state came into existence on 1 October 1953.
