= Sivanthi Adithan =

Indian media proprietor (1936-2013)

Dr. Sivanthi Adityan
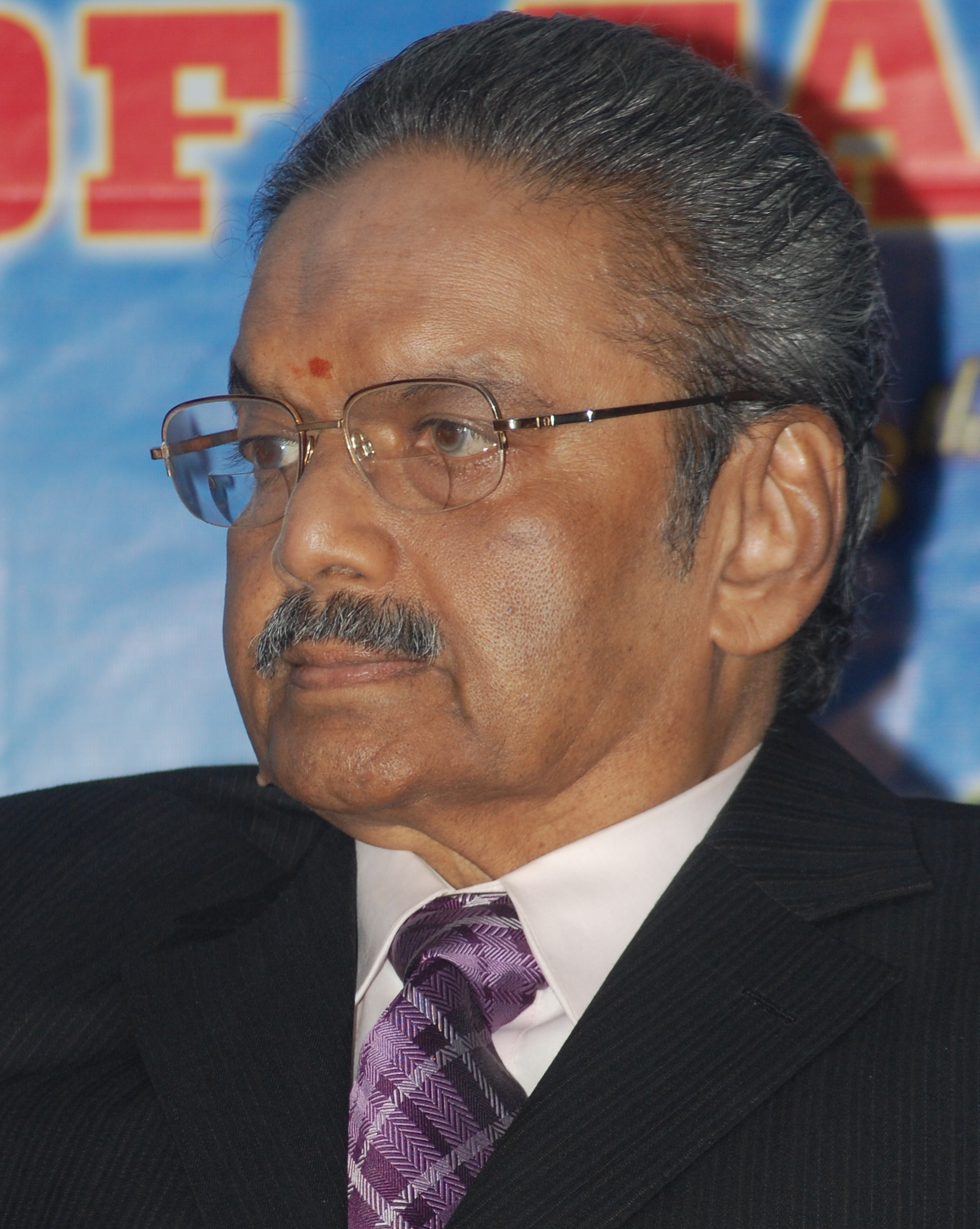

8th President of Indian Olympic Association
- In office 1987–1996
- Preceded by: Vidya Charan Shukla
- Succeeded by: Suresh Kalmadi

Personal details
- Born: 24 September 1936 Kayamozhi, Madras Province, British India
- Died: 19 April 2013 (aged 76) Chennai, Tamil Nadu, India
- Spouse: S. Malathi Adityan
- Children: S. Balasubramanian Adityan; Anitha Kumaran; Mala Jayaram
- Parents: S. P. Adithanar (father); A. Govindamal (mother)
- Relatives: K. P. K. Kumaran (son-in-law)

Sivanthi Adityan (24 September 1936 – 19 April 2013) was an Indian media proprietor who ran Tamil newspapers Daily Thanthi and Maalaimalar. Sivanthi started the first evening Tamil daily Maalai Murasu at Tirunelveli in 1959. He was an educationist, an industrialist and a philanthropist.

He was popularly called Chinna Ayya (a common nickname, "Little Sir") as a mark of respect by people. In 2012, he bought the NDTV Hindu news channel and renamed it as Thanthi TV. He was the President of Indian Olympic Association from 1987 to 1996.

== Early life, family and education ==
Born in Tiruchendur, Sivanthi Adityan was the second son of S. P. Adithanar and Govinthammal. S. P. Adithanar was a lawyer, ex-minister and founder of the Tamil daily newspaper Daily Thanthi. Sivanthi was educated at Ramakrishna Higher Secondary School and Besant Theosophical High School. He received his bachelors degree at Presidency College, Chennai. He was an active NCC Cadet during his school and college days. He served as the NCC Commander in his college.

== Career ==
He began his career as an ordinary worker at Dinath Thanthi, despite being the son of S. P. Adithyan. Nevertheless, Sivanthi gradually climbed the ranks to become the editor. Daily Thanthi was printed in three cities (Chennai, Madurai, Trichy) when S. P. Adithanar handed over the mantle to him in 1959. Under his guidance, Daily Thanthi was published in 15 cities across the country and became the most-read Tamil daily.

== Philanthropy ==
He was a philanthropist and funded the renovation of many temples. In the southern districts of Tamil Nadu, there are many sports clubs bearing his name. He also constructed a state-of-the-art indoor volleyball stadium in the Adithanar College, Tiruchendur, where the Indian team used to practice. Dr.B.Sivanthi Adityan renovated the 178-foot (54.3 m) 'Rajagopuram' of Arulmigu Kasivishvanathar Temple Tenkasi, whose gopuram was damaged 200 years ago.

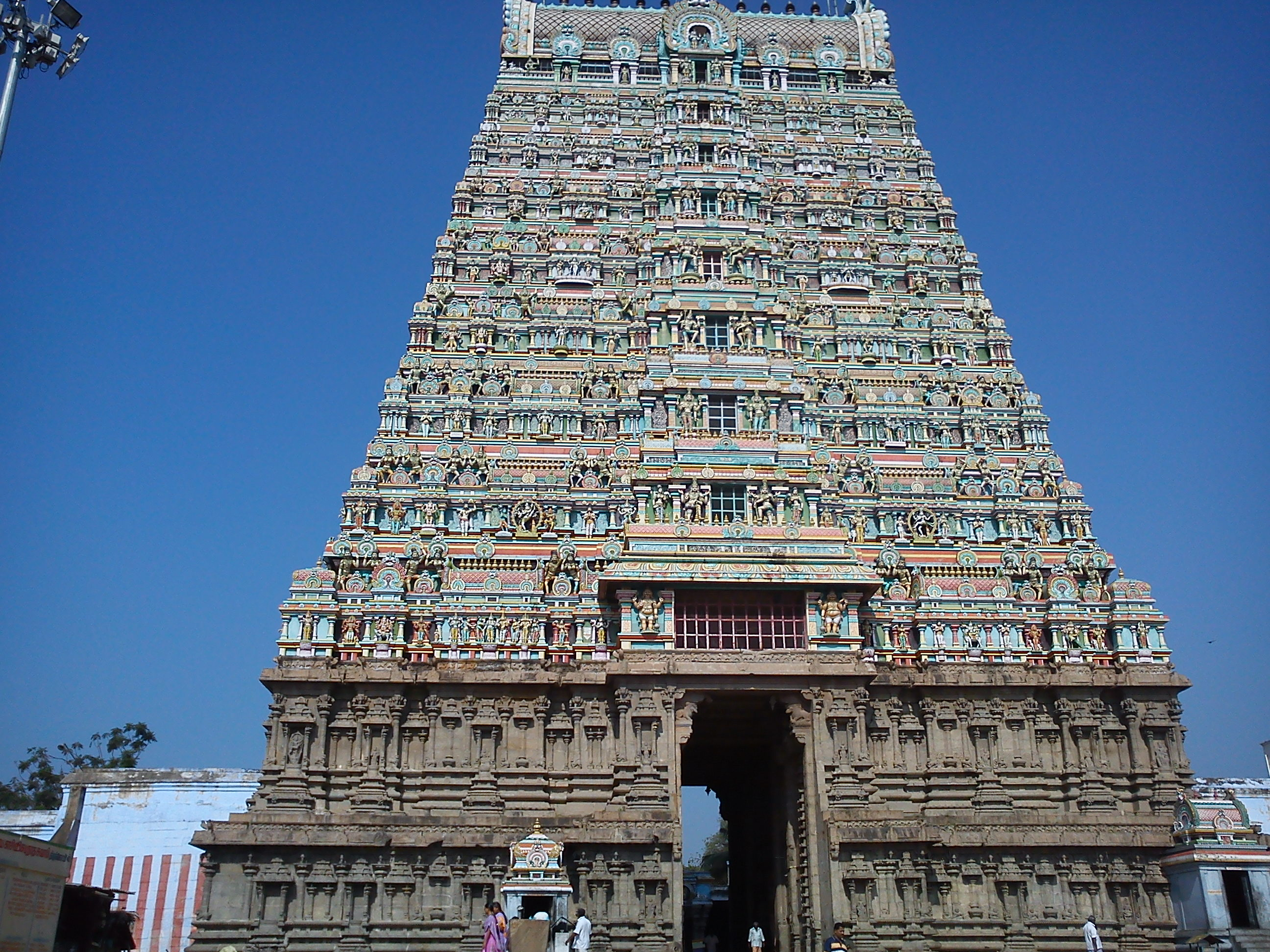
A view of Kasi Vishwanathar Temple Rajagopuram.

== Awards and recognition ==
The Government of India awarded him Padma Shri in the year 2008 in recognition of his distinguished service in the field of Literature and Education.

Adityan was President of the Indian Olympic Association from 1987 to 1996. During this time, he was compelled to fight various forces, legally and diplomatically. He was the first (and till now, the only) person from the South to head the IOA. During his tenure as president, he played an instrumental role in bringing the South Asian Federation Games to India. He was also instrumental in building the South Asian Federation Games Village in Chennai. He was elected as the president of the Indian Olympic Association. He was also the president of the Indian Olympic Association and vice president of the Olympic Council of Asia. In 1995, the International Olympic Committee conferred upon him the Olympic Order in recognition of outstanding source rendered by him for the development of Sports & Education.

He was awarded a Gold Medal on 19 July 1989 by the International Volleyball Federation in recognition of his valuable contribution to the development of volleyball in India. His services rendered for the development of Sports and Education earned him the Sports and Study Award of the International Olympic Committee for 1987. He is the first Indian to receive such an award. He was the vice-president of the Sports Development Authority of Tamil Nadu.

== Personal life and demise ==
Sivanthi Adityan and his wife had a two daughters and a son, S. Balasubramanian Adityan Sivanthi was an avid sportsman and had a daily workout.

Sivanthi Adityan died on 19 April 2013 in Chennai.

Civic offices
Preceded by Vidya Charan Shukla	President of Indian Olympic Association; 1987–1996	Succeeded by Suresh Kalmadi
