= Dinakaran =

Indian daily Tamil newspaper from Tamil Nadu

- Type: Daily newspaper
- Format: Broadsheet
- Owner: Sun Group
- Founder: K. P. Kandasamy
- Founded: 1977
- Language: Tamil
- Headquarters: Chennai, Tamil Nadu, India
- Circulation: 1,167,189 daily (as of Jul – Dec 2015)
- Website: Dinakaran website

Dinakaran is a Tamil daily newspaper distributed in Tamil Nadu, India. It was founded by K. P. Kandasamy in 1977 and is currently owned by media conglomerate Sun Group's Sun Network. Dinakaran was the second largest circulated Tamil daily in India after Dina Thanthi as of 2015.

Dinakaran was founded in 1977 by K. P. Kandasamy after he split from Dina Thanthi owned by his father-in-law S. P. Adithanar during the split of All India Anna Dravida Munnetra Kazhagam from Dravida Munnetra Kazhagam. In 2005, the newspaper was acquired from K. P. K. Kumaran by Kalanithi Maran's Sun Group.

Dinakaran is published from 12 cities in India: Bengaluru, Chennai, Coimbatore, Madurai, Mumbai, New Delhi, Nagercoil, Puducherry, Salem, Tiruchirappalli, Tirunelveli and Vellore. As of 2014, the newspaper had a circulation of 1,215,583.

== See also ==
- Dinakaran attack
