= I. Shanmuganathan =

Indian journalist and Daily Thanthi editor

- Born: c. 1935; Tiruchirappalli district, India
- Died: May 2024
- Occupations: Journalist, newspaper editor
- Known for: Editor of Dina Thanthi; 70-year career at the paper
- Awards: Kalaignar Ezhuthukol Award (2021)

I. Shanmuganathan (c. 1935 – May 2024) was an Indian journalist and newspaper editor. He worked at the Tamil daily Dina Thanthi for over 70 years.

== Career ==
He joined Dina Thanthi as a sub-editor in 1953 and rose to editor in the same organisation. He was the architect behind Varalatru Suvadugal, a historical work of the Dina Thanthi group, which sold over one lakh copies.

== Award ==
He received the Kalaignar Ezhuthukol Award for 2021. It was presented by Tamil Nadu Chief Minister M. K. Stalin on 3 June 2022, with a cash prize of ₹5 lakh and a citation.

== Death ==
He died in May 2024. His death was condoled by Tamil Nadu Governor R. N. Ravi, Chief Minister Stalin and other leaders.
