= Self-immolation of Murugathasan Varnakulasingham =

Eelam Tamil protester

Murugathasan Varnakulasingham
- Born: 2 December 1982
- Died: 13 February 2009 (aged 26); Geneva, Switzerland
- Cause of death: Burns from self-immolation
- Known for: Self-immolation for the Eelam Tamil cause

Murugathasan Varnakulasingham (2 December 1982 – 13 February 2009) was a Eelam Tamil, one of seven who immolated themselves to protest the treatment of Tamil people by the government of Sri Lanka.

Varnakulasingham was a computing graduate and part-time Sainsbury's shelf-stacker. He went to Geneva from his house on Grange Avenue, Belmont, Harrow, to protest the Sri Lankan government's war against the Tamils. On 13 February 2009, after days of protesting, Varnakulasingham poured petrol over his body and killed himself at the gate of United Nations headquarters in Geneva. He was 26.

He wrote a letter explaining his choice, writing that

We Tamils, displaced and all over the world, loudly raised our problems and asked for help before [the] international community in your own language for three decades. But nothing happened ... So I decided to sacrifice my life ... The flames over my body will be a torch to guide you through the liberation path.

His family stated that they were proud of their son's action and his death was commemorated by British Tamils.

== See also ==
- K. Muthukumar
- Altruistic suicide
- Sri Lankan government war against Tamils (main article)
