= K. P. Kandasamy =

Indian publisher and politician (Died 1994)

K. P. Kandasamy (K.P.K)

Personal details
- Died: 1994
- Party: Dravida Munnetra Kazhagam
- Relations: S. P. Adithanar (Father-in-Law)
- Children: K. P. K. Kumaran
- Occupation: Publisher; Politician

K. P. Kandasamy was a publisher and politician from the Indian state of Tamil Nadu and founder of Dinakaran, a Tamil daily newspaper. He founded Dinakaran in support of Dravida Munnetra Kazhagam (DMK) when his father-in-law, S. P. Adithanar, chose to support Anna Dravida Munnetra Kazhagam during its split from DMK in 1977. He was the member of the fifth Tamil Nadu assembly. He is the father of K. P. K. Kumaran.
