= Karkuvel Ayyanar Temple =

Hindu temple

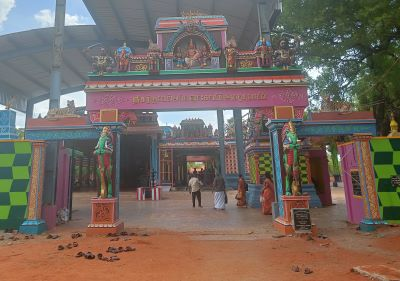
Karguvel Ayyanar Temple entrance

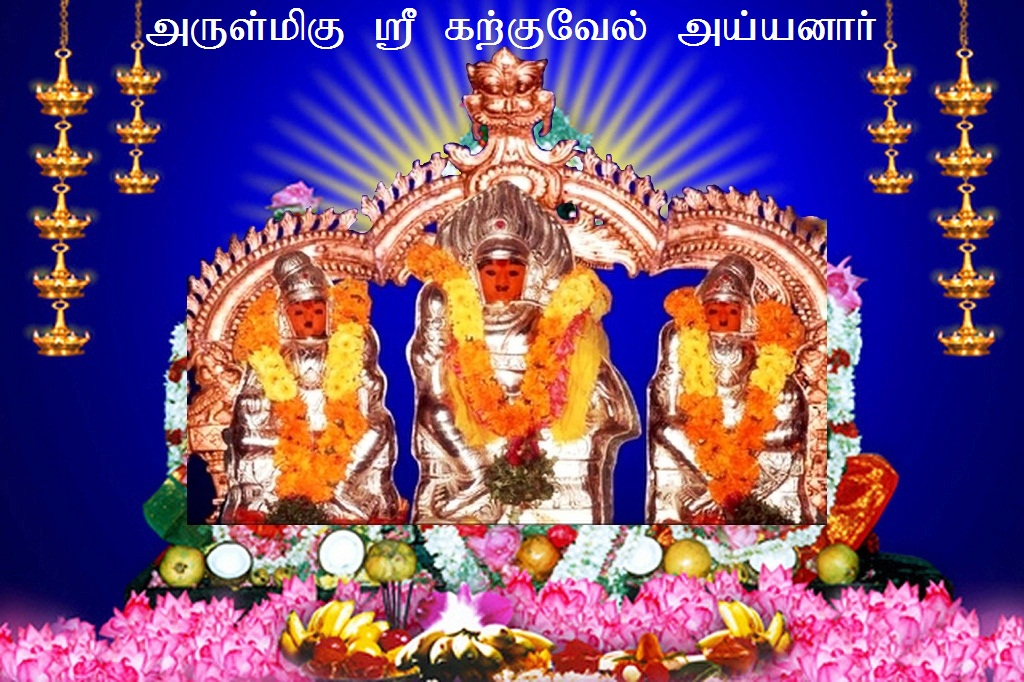
Sri Karkuvel Ayyanar

Karkuvel Ayyanar Temple is a Hindu temple in a village named Kuthiraimozhi in Thoothukudi, in the Indian state of Tamil Nadu. The temple is estimated to be 500–1,000 years old. The temple is surrounded by a red sand desert, unique to this part of Tamilnadu, with many cashew and palm trees. This is the only desert found in South India.

== Location ==
This temple is located in Kuthiraimozhi-Theri Kudiyiruppu village, about 1 kilometre (0.62 mi) from Kayamozhi which is 14 kilometres (8.7 mi) from Thiruchendur.

== Deities ==
It is said that the presiding deity of the Ayyanar has come from a tree known as Karkuva. He is also called Karkuva Ayyan, Karku Velappan, Karukkuvalai Ayyan, and Karkuvel Ayyanar, among other names. He is found with his consorts, goddess Poornam and goddess Porkamalam, in a sitting posture. There are also separate shrines for other deities. Other Gods there include Periyandavar, Udhiramadan, Malayamman, Ivar Raja, Vanniya Raja, Vannichi, Pechiyamman, Ponirulapar, Kallar Sami, SolkelaVeeran Thuppakki Madan, and Sarvasakthi Amman.

== Kallar Vettu ==
The main festival of this temple is Kallar Vettu ('Killing of Robber'). It is celebrated every year on the last five days of Tamil month Karthigai (mid-November to mid-December) and the first day of Tamil month Margazhi (mid-December to mid-January). The sixth day festival is celebrated in a grand manner. The day of the festival in the early hours of the morning, pots of milk, and water from Thamirabarani River, considered holy is collected. The holy water is placed on an elephant and brought to the temple. Later Mulaippari is taken. By 12.00 noon special pujas are held. On that day, by 4.00 p.m. 'Kallar Vettu' took place. At that time tender coconut, considered as Kallar, is broken in the rear side of the temple. The cocoanut water which came from it is considered as holy water. The devotees, took the sand on which the coconut water, spray it in their field for bounty yield. Some keep them in their cash box. It is considered as auspicious and would bring them wealth.

The deity of this village is believed to protect the houses in this village from robbery and thievery. Several lakhs of people from all over the world visit this temple and gather to celebrate the auspicious event. Villu Pattu (bow song) about the Praise of Karguvel Ayyanar is another attraction.

== Kumbhabhishekham ==
The latest Kumbhabhishekam of this temple was held on 1 September 2022. From an inscription found in this temple it is learnt that previous Kumbhabhishekam was held on 31 October 2008.
