= Maalai Malar =

Indian newspaper

- Type: Daily newspaper
- Format: Broadsheet
- Founder: S. P. Adithanar
- Language: Tamil
- Website: maalaimalar.com

Maalai Malar is a daily evening Tamil newspaper. It is owned by Daily Thanti group. It was founded by S. P. Adithanar in 1977 at Coimbatore. Maalai Malar has twelve editions published from Chennai, Vellore, Dindigul, Thanjavur, Tirunelveli, Coimbatore, Erode, Madurai, Nagercoil, Pudhucheri, Salem and Tiruchirappalli.

== See also ==
- Dina Thanthi
- Thanthi TV
- Hello FM
- DT Next (Chennai Based English Daily Newspaper)
