= K. Muthukumar =

Indian journalist and activist

- Born: Kumar Muthukumar; 19 November 1982; Thoothukudi, Tamil Nadu, India
- Died: 29 January 2009 (aged 26); Chennai, Tamil Nadu, India
- Cause of death: Burns from self-immolation
- Occupations: Journalist, writer, Tamil activist
- Known for: Self-immolation for the Sri Lankan Tamil cause

Kumar Muthukumar was an Indian journalist and activist based in the state of Tamil Nadu, who came into prominence when he immolated himself protesting against the brutal atrocities against the Sri Lankan Tamil people at the peak of civil war in the country. His death instantly triggered widespread strikes, demonstrations and public unrest in the state, most notably the manifestation of popular defiance of the Government of India ban against the Liberation Tigers of Tamil Eelam, which the people demonstrated carrying flags of Tamil Eelam, placards and images of the LTTE leader V. Prabhakaran in the funeral procession of Muthukumar. Subsequently, 6 more Tamils committed self-immolation in various parts of the globe including India, Malaysia and Switzerland.

== Death ==
On 29 January 2009, Muthukumar doused himself with several litres of petrol, and set himself on fire opposite the state Congress headquarters in Shastri Bhavan, Chennai. Just before his death, he flung several copies of his eight-page note in which he protested the Indian government's war in Sri Lanka against the Tamils. With 95% burn injuries, he was rushed to the Kilpauk Medical College in a critical condition, with slim chances of survival. He succumbed within a short span of time.

Police officials later told media that Muthukumar had not experienced any fear or wavering; he had been resolute in his decision to sacrifice his life to highlight the need for a permanent ceasefire.

When a doctor had asked him why such an educated person like him committed self-immolation, he had replied that several thousands of more intelligent and educated Tamil people were dying in Eezham and that he intended to save thousands of lives by sacrificing himself.

Muthukumar's grandmother, who remains in his native place of Kulavai Nallur in Thoothukudi (Tuticorin), had made plans to get him married in the coming months. When she learned news of his self-immolation, she broke down and cried uncontrollably.

== Legacy ==
His letter addressed to the youth moved many. Many took to the streets after his death. Over a hundred thousand people, including students belonging to various colleges in the state, cadres of several political parties, women organizations, mediapersons and members of the public participated in his funeral. Among those who attended were Vaiko, Thirumavalavan, Nedumaran, Seeman, S. Ramadoss, R.K. Selvamani and Bharathiraja. Mourners shouted fiery slogans and displayed the flag of Tamil Eelam and portraits of V. Prabhakaran.

All shops in the district had downed their shutters as a mark of solidarity. Members of the public welcomed the procession and saluted Muthukumar's sacrifice by lighting torches. Hoardings of Sonia Gandhi, Karunanidhi and Jayalalitha, leaders of the mainstream political parties in the state, were burnt. Students were undeterred by the deployment of a heavy police and paramilitary force by the state.

Slogans raised in the meeting were in support of a separate Tamil homeland, Eelam, and in praise of its national leader Prabhakaran and the Tamil Tigers. Following Muthukumar, 17 other youth from Tamil Nadu have burnt themselves for the same cause. A statue was erected for him in Thanjavur.

== Reactions ==
=== State Government ===
Even before the funeral procession entered the cremation ground, news reached the students that the ruling DMK Government had ordered indefinite closure of all colleges and hostels to clamp down protests. Furthermore the state used its police to take down names of protesting students, and lawyers who were engaged in boycott of court proceedings and active protests were brutally assaulted.

=== Liberation Tigers of Tamil Eelam ===
The LTTE political head Nadesan saluted Muthukumar's sacrifice and added that the Heroic Tamil Son Muthukumar would have a permanent place in the global Tamil history. The condolence message read as follows:

The LTTE salutes the sacrifice of Muthukumar, who carried the emotional message of the 70 million Tamil Nadu people against the genocidal war by the Sinhala chauvinism in Tamil Eelam

=== Tamil National Alliance ===
The Tamil National Alliance (TNA) offered its condolences and opined that the sacrifice which was made for the liberation of the Eelam Tamils must be esteemed forever by all Tamils. Tamil National Alliance MP Srikandha attended the funeral ceremony.

=== Tamil diaspora ===
Muthukumar's sacrifice became a symbol for many members of the diaspora, and by 14 February, at least 6 people had sacrificed their lives by self-immolation calling for a ceasefire and protecting the Tamils in the island.

== See also ==
- Self-immolation of Murugathasan Varnakulasingham
