= S. P. Adithanar =

Indian media proprietor, lawyer and politician (1905-1981)

Si. Pa. Adithanar
- Si. Pa. Adithanar

Minister for Co-operation (Government of Tamil Nadu)
- In office 1968–1977
- Preceded by: S. Madhavan

Member of Legislative Assembly
- In office 1967–1977
- Preceded by: A. P. C. Veerabahu
- Succeeded by: K. Sathu Selvaraj
- Constituency: Srivaikuntam
- In office 1957–1962
- Preceded by: K. T. Kosalram
- Succeeded by: K. T. Kosalram
- Constituency: Sathankulam
- In office 1952–1957
- Preceded by: NA
- Succeeded by: M. S. Selvaraj
- Constituency: Tiruchendur

Speaker of Tamil Nadu Legislative Assembly
- In office 1967–1968
- Preceded by: S. Chellapandian
- Succeeded by: Pulavar K. Govindan

Member of Madras Legislative Council
- In office 1947–1952
- In office 1964–1967

Personal details
- Born: 27 September 1905 Kayamozhi, Madras Presidency, British India
- Died: 24 May 1981 (aged 75)
- Party: Naam Tamilar Katchi (1958); Kisan Mazdoor Praja Party (1952); Dravida Munnetra Kazhagam (1967)
- Spouse: Govindammal
- Children: 3, including Sivanthi
- Relatives: K. P. Kandasamy (son-in-law); K. P. K. Kumaran (grandson); Shiv Nadar (Nephew)
- Occupation: Media proprietor Politician

Sivanthi Balasubramania Athithan (also known as Si. Ba. Adithanar, born. 27 September 1905 – 24 May 1981), popularly called "Adithanar", was an Indian media proprietor, lawyer, politician, former minister and founder of the Tamil daily newspaper Dina Thanthi. He was the founder of Naam Tamilar Katchi. He served as a member of the Madras Legislative Council for two terms and as a member of the Tamil Nadu Legislative Assembly for four terms. He was the Speaker of the Assembly during 1967–68 and Tamil Nadu's minister for Cooperation in the M. Karunanidhi cabinets of 1969 and 1971. In his memory, two Tamil literary awards were created and are awarded annually by his son, Sivanthi Adithanar (former Director of the Dina Thanthi group).

== Early life ==
Adithanar was born on 27 September 1905 at Kayamozhi in Tiruchendur Taluk of Tuticorin district to Sivanthi Adithanar and Kanagam Ammayar as the heir of the Adityans, the highest aristocratic family among the Nelamaikkarars. His father, Sivanthi Adithanar, was a lawyer. Adithanar's sister, Vamasundari Devi, was mother of Indian businessman Shiv Nadar. He completed his schooling at Srivaikuntam and joined St. Joseph's College, Trichy. After obtaining a M. A, he went to Middle Temple, London to study law. He became a barrister in 1933 and practised in Singapore (during 1933–42) and later in his home town Srivaikuntam. He married Govindammal in 1933.

== Publishing career ==
Adithanar returned to India in 1942 when Singapore fell to the Japanese. He established a Tamil weekly magazine, Tamizhan, and a daily newspaper, Thanthi, in November 1942. He set out to find a Tamil daily along the lines of the English tabloid Daily Mirror, inspired by the Mirror's reach of a large audience. He established Dina Thanthi (lit. The Daily Telegraph) from Madurai in 1942 and it went on to become the flagship of his newspaper business. He expanded operations by opening additional editions in Tirunelveli, Madras, Salem and Tiruchirapalli in the 1940s. By bringing out local editions, Dina Thanthi helped deliver news on the same day to the people in southern districts of Tamil Nadu, who until then had to read day-old newspapers printed in Madras. The paper was popular and it was said that people learned to read the Tamil language to read the newspaper. The simplified language introduced by the paper helped it gain new readership.

Other publications from Adithanar's Dina Thanthi group include the evening daily Maalai Murasu (lit. The Evening Drum), the weekly magazine Rani, and the monthly novel imprint Rani Muthu.

== Political career ==
Adithanar started the "Tamil Rajyam" party in 1942. During 1947–52, he was a member of the Madras Legislative Council. He contested and won the 1952 election from Tiruchendur as a candidate of T. Prakasam's Kisan Mazdoor Praja Party. He was elected as an independent candidate in the 1957 election from Sathankulam.

=== Naam Tamilar Katchi ===
In 1958, Adithanar founded the "Naam Tamilar Katchi" (நாம் தமிழர் கட்சி) party with the platform of forming a sovereign Tamil state. It wanted the creation of a homogeneous Greater Tamil Nadu incorporating Tamil-speaking areas of India and Sri Lanka. The party's headquarters was named Tamiḻaṉ Illam (lit. The Home of the Tamilian). In 1960, the party organised statewide protests for the secession of Madras and the establishment of a sovereign Tamil Nadu. The protests were marked by the burning of maps of India (with Tamil Nadu left out). Adithanar was arrested for organising them. The party along with M. P. Sivagnanam's Tamil Arasu Kazhagam was also involved in the movement to change the name of the state from Madras State to Tamil Nadu. Adithanar lost the 1962 election from Tiruchendur and was elected to the Legislative Council in 1964. The WT contested the 1967 election as an ally of the Dravida Munnetra Kazhagam (DMK) under the DMK's "Rising Sun" symbol. It elected four members to the Assembly, including Adithanar, who won from Srivaikuntam. The party merged with the DMK in 1967.

=== As Speaker of the Legislative Assembly ===
On 17 March 1967, Adithanar became the speaker of the assembly defeating the Swatantra Party candidate K. S. Kothandaramiah, by 153 votes to 21. While he was the speaker he attended the DMK political conference held at Tanjore in 1968 and also took part in political activities in his constituency. Due to these activities, the opposition parties accused him of partisanship. He defended himself as:

I am as much as a politician as leader of the opposition is and as such, I can not refrain myself from the party activities of the DMK with whose support and under whose symbol I have been elected to the Assembly. But it does not mean that I am partial and partisan.

Due to this controversy, Adithanar resigned as speaker on 12 August 1968.

=== As minister ===
Adithanar became the Minister for Cooperation in the M. Karunanidhi cabinet, which took power in February 1969. He was re-elected from Srivaikuntam in the 1971 elections and continued as the Minister for Cooperation.

=== Later political life ===
The DMK split in 1972, with M. G. Ramachandran forming the Anna Dravida Munnetra Kazhagam (ADMK). Adithanar supported the ADMK. He contested and lost the 1977 election as an ADMK supported independent from Sathankulam. He also lost the 1980 election from Srivaikuntam.

=== Electoral performance in Assembly elections ===
Year	Status	Constituency	Party	Votes	Runner-up/winner	Party	Votes
1957	Winner	Sathankulam	IND	33,636	S. Kandasamy	INC	22,429
1962	2nd	Tiruchendur	Naam Tamilar	27,994	M. S. Selvarajan	INC	39,994
1967	Winner	Srivaikuntam	DMK	41,828	R. Nadar	INC	22,767
1971	Winner	Srivaikuntam	DMK	37,329	R. A. R. Annamalai	NCO	27,724
1977	2nd	Sathankulam	IND	17,507	R. Jebamani	JNP	18,362
1980	3rd	Srivaikuntam	IND	12,119	E. Ramasubramanian	ADMK	26,502

== Death and legacy ==
Adithanar died on 24 May 1981. In 2005, the then Tamil Nadu Chief Minister, J. Jayalalithaa announced that his home in Srivaikuntam, built in 1928, would be converted into a memorial. He is survived by two sons. B. Ramachandran Adityan (founder of Devi Weekly) and B. Sivanthi Adityan. On his birthday every year, the S. P. Adithanar Senior Tamil Scholar Award of Rs. 300,000 and the S. P. Adithanar Literary Award of Rs. 200,000 are awarded to Tamil scholars and people who excel in literature by Adithanar's son and the current director of the Dina Thanthi group, Sivanthi Adithan. A road in Chennai, connecting Egmore to Anna Salai, was named "Adithanar Salai" in his memory.

== Bibliography ==
- Tamiḻp Pēraracu (lit. The Tamil empire) (1942)
- Idhalalar Kaiyedu (lit. The Journalist's Handbook)
