= Protests against the Sri Lankan civil war =

2008–2009 protests in several countries

Between 2008 and 2009, major protests against the Sri Lankan civil war (often referred to as the Tamil protests by Western news media) took place in several countries around the world, urging national and world leaders and organisations to take action on bringing a unanimous cease fire to the Sri Lankan Civil War, which had taken place for twenty-six years. Tamil diaspora populations around the world expressed concerns regarding the conduct of the civil war in the island nation of Sri Lanka. The civil war, which took place between the Sri Lankan Army and the separatist group Liberation Tigers of Tamil Eelam is believed to have killed over 100,000 civilians. Protesters and critics of the Sri Lankan government that triggered a culturally based civil war to be a systematic genocide and ethnic cleansing of the Sri Lankan Tamil minority in Sri Lanka.

While opposition by Tamils was expressed at various stages of the war since 1983, opposition intensified in January 2009. Protesters appealed to international politicians intervene in the Sri Lankan civil war and request a ceasefire, send humanitarian aid to the Northern Province, promote the creation of Tamil Eelam, and remove the LTTE from lists of terrorist organisations. After the government of Sri Lanka declared victory over the LTTE on 18 May 2009, protests continued, accusing then-Sri Lankan President Mahinda Rajapaksa of war crimes. Protests took several forms, including human chains, demonstrations, rallies, hunger strikes, and self-immolation.

Protests occurred internationally and not in Sri Lanka itself. Following increasing protests in Chennai and other cities in the Indian state of Tamil Nadu, predominantly peaceful demonstrations were held concurrently around the world by the Tamil diaspora, mainly in national capitals, central business districts, near embassies and high commissioner offices, and sites of national or supranational government. Protesters ranging from several dozens to several thousands gathered in the cities of Delhi, Bangalore, Singapore, Kuala Lumpur, London, Paris, Brussels, Berlin, The Hague, Zürich, Geneva, Bern, Oslo, Toronto, Montreal, Vancouver, Ottawa, New York City, Washington, Sydney, Melbourne, Canberra, Auckland, Wellington, and Durban.

== Notable locations and events ==
=== Australia ===
In Australia, large protests took place in Sydney, Melbourne and Canberra. Over a thousand protested during Sri Lankan foreign minister Rohitha Bogollagama's visit to Australia on 14 October 2008. The protest took place in Canberra outside the National Press Club. The protesters accused the Sri Lankan government alleging attack on civilians and the prevention of aid by the United Nations reaching affected areas. In response to the protests, Australian foreign minister Stephen Smith stated that he raised the concern of the violence amid the civil war. He also assured that Australia insists that military means will not solve the problem and that a political solution can only result in the ending of the war.

After several local demonstrations, mostly in Sydney, larger protests were organised within Australia during the month of April 2009, with the most significant one being the non-stop protest in Sydney. As of April, 60 rallies and protests had occurred across Australia. On 11 April, three Australian protesters began hunger strikes, like those concurrently occurring in Ottawa and London. The hunger strike ended on 17 April. On 17 April, a "March for Peace" took place in Canberra. On 13 April, protests took place in front of Prime Minister Kevin Rudd's residence in Sydney, urging him to call an immediate ceasefire. Several hundred protesters rallied in North Sydney urging Joe Hockey, member for North Sydney, to take the concerns of his constituents to the Australian Prime Minister and Foreign Minister. Similar protests occurred on 22 April, as over 600 protesters converged outside Julie Owens's office to voice their frustration at the lack of action by the Australian Labour Government in preventing thousands of Tamil civilians from allegedly being killed by the Sri Lankan Military. A "Boycott Sri Lankan Products" campaign was launched in Sydney during the last week of April. The demonstrations occurred with a few roads being closed down to make way. The protests were paused for ANZAC Day on 25 April.

In three separate occasions, some Sinhalese Australians were targeted in hate crimes, such as acid attacks and home invasions, in Sydney on 10 May 2009.

=== Canada ===
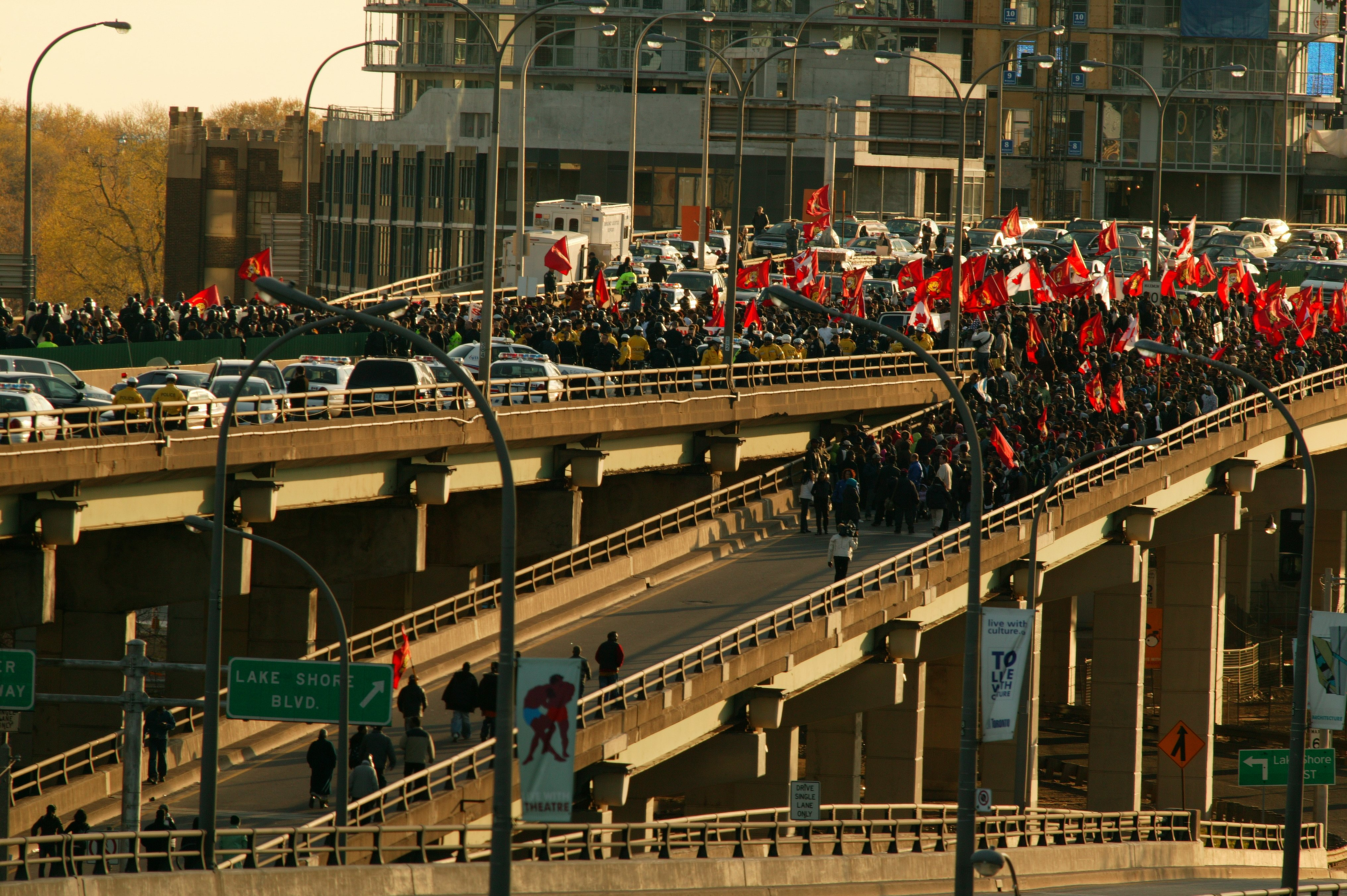
Protesters blocking the Gardiner Expressway in Toronto on 10 May 2009

Some of the largest demonstrations against the Sri Lankan civil war took place in Canada, mostly in Toronto and Ottawa, but also in Montreal, Vancouver and Calgary. Protesters attempted to appeal to the Prime Minister of Canada, Stephen Harper, the President of the United States, Barack Obama and the Consulate General of Sri Lanka in Canada, Bandula Jayasekara, to take action in ending the conflict.

The first notable demonstration took place on 28 January 2009 in front of the Consulate General of Sri Lanka in Midtown Toronto involving a few hundred people. Protesters began to grow from then onwards. After negative remarks from Jayasekara, protests continued in front of the Consulate General of the United States on University Avenue. Protesters also convened on Parliament Hill in Ottawa for several days, before returning to continue in Toronto.

=== India ===
In India, large-scale protests took place primarily in the Indian state of Tamil Nadu. Protests, rallies, human chains, strikes and demonstrations have continuously taken place throughout Chennai by lawyers, politicians, activists, student groups, celebrities, and many organisations. The aim of the protests was to urge leaders, such as Tamil Nadu's Chief Minister M. Karunanidhi, leader of the opposition J. Jayalalithaa, Indian Prime Minister Manmohan Singh and Minister of External Affairs Pranab Mukherjee to intervene and stop the Sri Lankan Civil War and stop any diplomatic assistance or relations with Sri Lanka.

Tamil Nadu, which has the highest rate of self-immolation deaths among states in India, saw increased incidents in 2009. On 29 January 2009, journalist and activist K. Muthukumar was the first to kill himself while protesting against the Sri Lankan civil war in Chennai; he left a four-page statement in which he accused the Indian government of a historical lack of sympathy towards Tamils and referred to Barack Obama as "our hope". Muthukumar's suicide was thought to intensify protests in Tamil Nadu and trigger uprisings around the world by the Sri Lankan Tamil diaspora. At least a dozen other self-immolation deaths occurred in Tamil Nadu during the year protesting the Sri Lankan civil war.

=== Norway ===
Norway had acted as a peace mediator in Sri Lanka prior to it being asked to leave by the Sri Lankan government of Rajapakse which ended the ceasefire in 2006 after alleging multiple violations by the LTTE. Pro-LTTE Tamil communities and organisations within Norway organised large protests including ones outside the Parliament of Norway Building, Inkognitogata 18, and other parts of Oslo. There were also protests outside the Sri Lankan embassy where a few protesters broke into the embassy, making it the first violent movement in the Tamil diaspora protests around the world. Although no one was hurt, severe damage was done inside the Embassy of Sri Lanka. Hundreds of Tamils gathered in Bergen, organising a 48-hour famine protest starting on 20 November.

=== Switzerland ===
On 19 February 2009, 26-year-old Murugathasan Varnakulasingham from London joined the ongoing protests in front of the United Nations Office in Geneva. Shortly after 20:00 CET, he doused himself in gasoline and set himself on fire. Police attempted to rescue him but he succumbed to his injuries. A statement letter he wrote in English and Tamil read, "We Tamils, displaced and all over the world, loudly raised our problems and asked for help before [the] international community in your own language for three decades. But nothing happened ... So I decided to sacrifice my life ... The flames over my body will be a torch to guide you through the liberation path." According to his brother, Murugathasan emigrated from Sri Lanka seven years prior to his death and reports and images from the civil war being circulated via internet and news media would leave him emotional. His self-immolation was an apparent copycat suicide following similar deaths during protests in Tamil Nadu.

=== United Kingdom ===
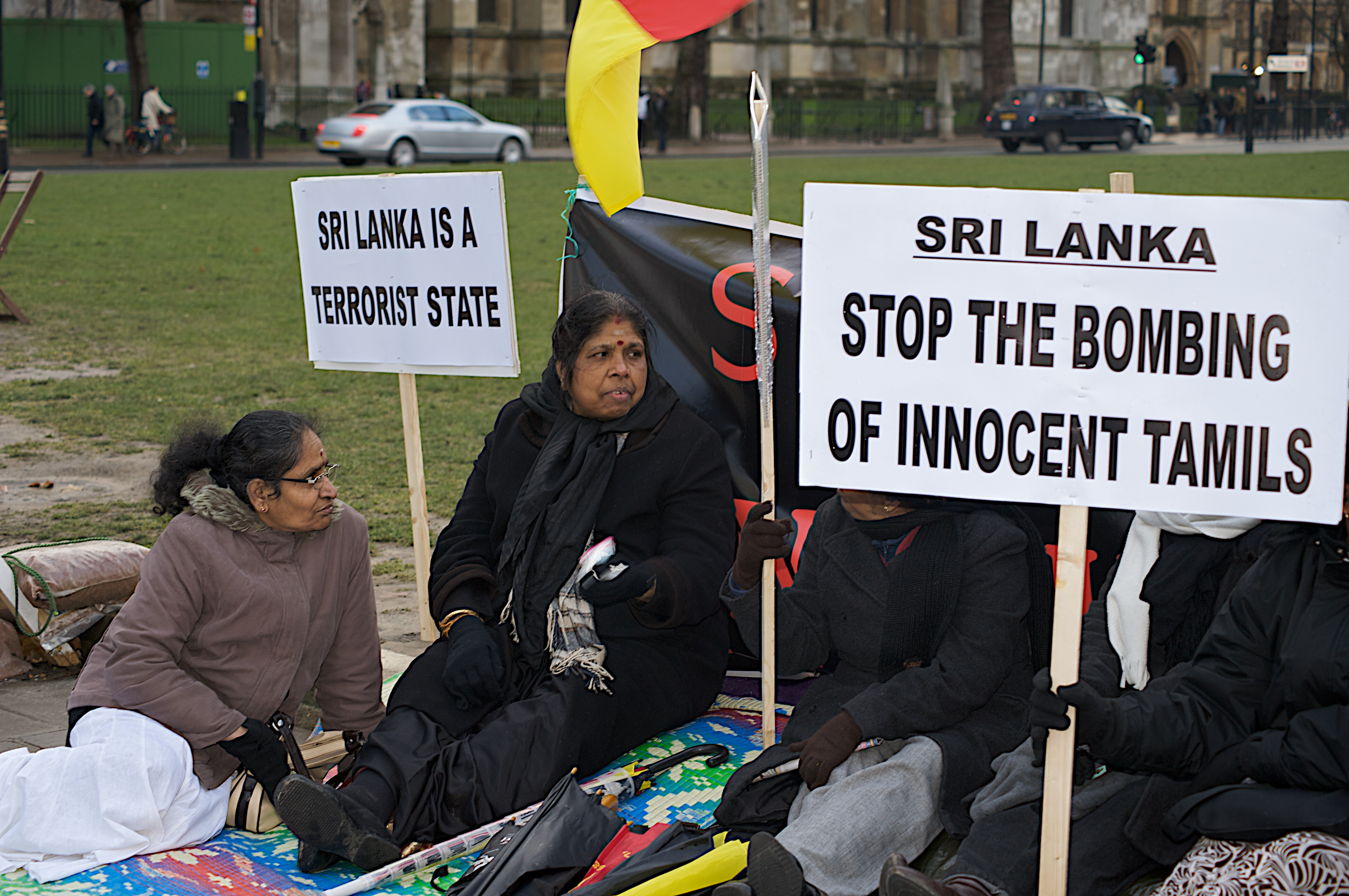
Protesters in Parliament Square, London in January 2009

The largest of the protests occurred in the United Kingdom. Protests were organised by the British Tamil Forum, a prominent diaspora organisation and a key association organising of the event, aiming to encourage British intervention in the Sri Lankan civil war. The first protest began on 18 January 2009 with around 9000 British Tamils in front of 10 Downing Street in London, participating in a mass vigil. A larger scaled protest occurred on 31 January 2009 which attracted a crowd of around 150,000 Tamils.

On 6 April an ongoing protest began, which continued into the middle of May. The next major protest took place on 11 April 2009, which attracted more than 200,000 Tamils. While the protesters diminished in numbers later on in the day, a number of people took place in non-stop protests on the streets, similar to protests that occurred in Canada. Two British Tamils, 21-year-old Sivatharsan Sivakumaravel and 28-year-old Parameswaran Subramanyam, went on hunger strike. On 11 May, the protesters in Parliament Square "spilled through police lines" causing roads to be blocked, with the protesters "noisy but peaceful."

In October 2009 the Daily Mail falsely claimed that a police surveillance team had been watching the two hunger strikers discovered that Subramanyam had been secretly eating McDonald's sandwiches with the help of clandestine deliveries. Subramaniyan denied the Daily Mail's allegations, calling them "entirely baseless" and a "conspiracy to defame the Tamil struggle". He stated that he also had medical proof. The police refused to discuss the allegations. The false claims were widely reported in the Sri Lankan media, allowing the Sri Lankan government and its supporters used them to condemn the Tamil protesters. Subramanyam then took legal action for libel against the Daily Mail and The Sun, which had repeated the false claims. He won the settlement in June 2010. The newspapers accepted that the claims had been entirely false, apologised to Subramanyam and paid him a total of £77,500 in damages—£30,000 from The Sun, and £47,500 from the Daily Mail—and paid his legal costs.

It was discovered that the United Kingdom sold arms to Sri Lanka worth over £13.6 million in the last three years of the conflict, contravening the 1998 Code of Conduct on Arms Exports by the European Union that restricts business with countries facing internal conflicts or with poor human rights records and a history of violating international law. Several members of parliament expressed anger at the development. Four committees in the House of Commons expressed concern in a joint statement that arms made in the United Kingdom were fired on civilians during battles in Sri Lanka. In their annual report, the cross-party committees on arms export controls recommended the government should review all arms exports to Sri Lanka following the crackdown on rebels. The MPs also questioned the government's commitment to tackling corruption and bribery and called on ministers to investigate what British-supplied military equipment was used in the campaign against the Tamils.

A number of protesters, such as Jan Jananayagam of Tamils Against Genocide, reiterated to the BBC that Tamils lived under "existential threat" in North Eastern Sri Lanka, that delayed recognition of genocidal acts cost lives, and that based on its record in Rwanda, the United Nations had not proved that it alone could defend Tamil people.

A Sinhalese Buddhist temple in Kingsbury was attacked and its members blamed LTTE sympathisers for the attack. A Sinhalese chicken shop chain had experienced attacks at several of its locations by Tamil vandals in late May and its staff were threatened. The owner noted that his staff was shouted at and asked if they were Tamil or Sinhalese. One month earlier, a gang had threatened to burn down his restaurant and accused him of supporting the Sri Lankan government.
