= Thanthi TV =

Indian Tamil-language television news channel

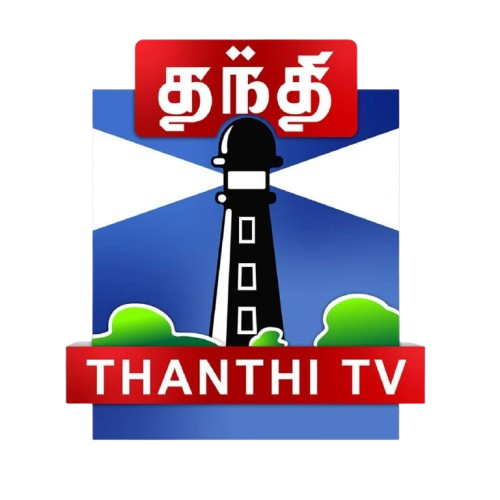
- Country: India
- Broadcast area: India
- Headquarters: Chennai, Tamil Nadu, India

Programming
- Language: Tamil
- Picture format: 576i (SD)

Ownership
- Owner: Dina Thanthi; Metronation Chennai Television Pvt Ltd.
- Sister channels: Maalai Murasu News; Thanthi One

History
- Launched: 13 November 2012
- Former names: NDTV Hindu

Links
- Website: www.thanthitv.com

Thanthi TV (previously known as NDTV Hindu) is a 24-hour Tamil news satellite television channel based in Chennai, India. It is owned by Dina Thanthi.

== History ==
NDTV Hindu was launched on 16 May 2009, owned by NDTV (51%) and The Hindu Group (49%). It was started as a Chennai city-specific English news and entertainment channel, broadcast only in Chennai.

After the Dina Thanthi group took over NDTV Hindu, it rebranded the channel as Thanthi TV. Initially it was a Chennai city-specific channel but after the acquisition, it was rebranded and relaunched on 13 November 2012 as a 24-hour Tamil news channel which serves and broadcasts to Tamil Nadu, India.

One of the channel's most watched shows is the Kelvikenna Bathil (What is the answer to the question) show, where the show's host interviews various leaders in Tamil Nadu, mainly political leaders.

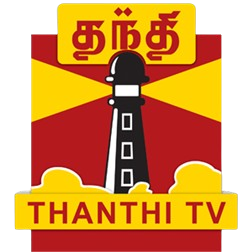
Logo revealed on 13.11.2012

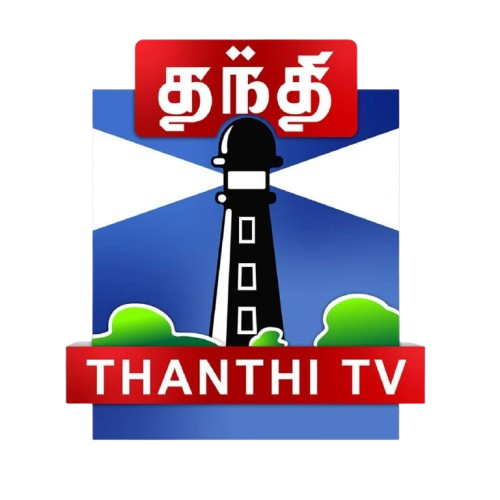
New logo revealed on 05.10.2024

== Election predictions ==
Thanthi TV commissioned an extensive pre- and post-poll surveys through Krish Info Media for the 2014 Parliamentary and 2016 Assembly elections in Tamil Nadu. The results predicted by the Krish Info Media-Thanti TV combination was claimed to be close to the actual results in both cases. The findings of the 2014 polls were telecasted through a show called 40/40 - Narpadhuku Narpadhu. The findings of the 2016 polls were telecasted through the widely popular show called "Makkal Yaar Pakkam." Both shows were hosted by the former Chief News Editor Rangaraj Pandey and data explained by Krish Info Media's chief Psephologist Arun Krishnamurthy.

== Thanthi One ==
Launched in 2024, Thanthi One is an Indian Tamil-language general entertainment satellite television channel featuring mostly dubbed content.

=== Dubbed series ===
Premiere date	Series	Dubbed from	Ref
19 May 2024	Bala Krishna	Hindi serial Baal Krishna	
19 May 2024	Ganapathiye Varuvaai	Hindi serial Vighnaharta Ganesh	
19 May 2024	Veera Aanchaneya	Hindi serial Sankat Mochan Mahabali Hanumaan	
19 May 2024	Karnan	Hindi serial Suryaputra Karn	
20 May 2024	Rani Ahilyabai	Hindi serial Punyashlok Ahilyabai	
21 May 2024	Thulasi C/O Krishnan	Hindi serial Tulsidham Ke Laddu Gopal	
22 May 2024	Thenaliraman	Hindi serial Thenali Rama	
23 May 2024	Alavudeen	Hindi serial Aladdin – Naam Toh Suna Hoga	
24 May 2024	Devi	Hindi serial Devi Adi Parashakti	
25 May 2024	Garudan	Hindi serial Dharm Yoddha Garud	
19 May 2024	Gayathri	Tamil serial Gayathri	
20 May 2024	Vaadi Rasathi	Malayalam serial Manjil Virinja Poovu	
21 May 2024	Bhagyajathakam	Malayalam serial Bhagyajathakam (TV series)	
22 May 2024	Vanampadi	Malayalam serial Raakkuyil	
23 May 2024	Koondukkili	Malayalam serial Sthreepadham	
24 May 2024	Priyatha Varam Vendum	Malayalam serial Priyapettaval	
25 May 2024	Ammu	Malayalam serial Ammuvinte Amma	
19 May 2024	Maveeran Purushothaman	Hindi serial Porus	
20 Sep 2024	Chanakya Thanthiram	Hindi serial Chandraguptamaurya (TV series)	
30 Apr 2025	Vaan oru vaan		
1 May 2025	Kaavalan		
2 May 2025	CID Sakunthala		
3 May 2025	Yaar?		
4 May 2025	Oh Butterfly		
5 May 2025	Niruvaai Malarvaai		
6 Sep 2024	Aathmaan		

=== Re-telecast series ===
Series	First aired	Last aired	Ref
Ilavarasi	19 May 2024	22 Mar 2025	
Thamarai	19 May 2024	TBD	
Chellamay	19 May 2024	19 Mar 2025	
Annamalai	23 Mar 2025	TBD	
Selvi	20 Mar 2025	TBD	

== See also ==
- Daily Thanthi
- Thanthi TV
- Malai Malar
- Hello FM
