= Mutharamman Temple, Kulasekharapatnam =

Sri Mutharamman Temple
- Arultharum Mutharamman Thirukoil
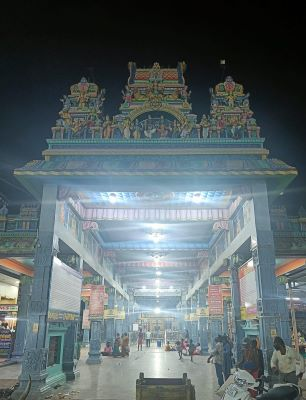

- Location in Tamil Nadu, Thoothukudi district

Religion
- Affiliation: Hinduism
- District: Thoothukudi District
- Deity: Lord Shiva as Gyanamoorthiswarar; Muththaramman

Location
- Location: Kulasekharapatnam
- State: Tamil Nadu
- Country: India
- Interactive map of Sri Mutharamman Temple
- Coordinates: 8°24′00.9″N 78°03′13.5″E

Architecture
- Type: Dravidian architecture

Website
- www.kulasaimutharammantemple.tnhrce.in

The Mutharamman Temple (Kulasai Mutharamman Temple) is located in Kulasekharapatnam near Thiruchendur in the Thoothukudi district, Tamil Nadu. It is 300 years old. The temple is situated at a distance of 14 km. from Tiruchendur.

== Presiding deity ==
The presiding deities are found in sitting posture. Just below them Siva in the form of a swyambu is found.The presiding deities, facing North, are Mutharamman and Gnanamoorthy. The temple tree is neem. As Meenakshi in Madurai, Mutharamaman gets a prominent place here.

== Structure ==
The primary deities are found in sitting posture. Mutharaman is found with ornaments, wearing mangalsutra. Her right leg is folded. Gnanamoorthy is having spectre in one hand and vibuthi in another hand. His left leg is folded. In the mandapa, Petchiamman, Karuppasamy and Bairavar are found.

== Dasara ==
There is a story connected with Dasara in this temple. Once Varamuni, a rishi did not give proper respect to Agastya. He cursed him to have the head of ox and human body. He would rid of from the curse through the Goddess. He, as Mahishasura went to all the places. In order to escape from him the Devas and rishis prayed Siva. Lord Siva, in turn, asked them to worship Parvati and get relieved from him. They did penance. The Goddess helped them to protect the penance. At that time, through the yaga, a baby girl namely Lalitambikai appeared. The child grew up in nine days and on the tenth day she became the Parasakthi Lalitambikai and slayed Mahishasura. The 10th day, of his killing, is celebrated as Dasara. The previous nine days are celebrated as Navaratri. Dussehra, the most famous temple after Mysore in India is held in this temple. During this festival, devotees from all over Tamil Nadu fast for 91, 48, 41, 31, 21, 11 days and take Kumbha wearing various costumes. Lakhs of people gather in this popular festival.

== Prayers ==
In order to get rid of smallpox the devotees worshipping here. If one follow vradha and worship the deity those who are affected by leprosy and mentally affected would be relieved of the disease. The devotees fulfill their vows by various means.

== History ==
During the festival processions are held round the various houses and special swords with a curved hook at the end called palli val (great or honourable sword) are carried by the Vannathar worshippers.These swords are worshipped during the Dusserah festival in October and in some shrines they form the only emblem of the deity
