= K. P. K. Kumaran =

Indian politician

Personal details
- Party: Dravida Munnetra Kazhagam
- Relations: K. P. Kandasamy Father; S. P. Adithanar (Grand-Father)
- Children: Kanikha Kumaran; Saraswathi Kumaran
- Occupation: Publisher; Politician

K. P. Kandasamy Kumaran (Tamil: கே.பி.கே.குமரன்), is a politician from the Dravida Munnetra Kazhagam party, is a former member of the Parliament of India who represented Tamil Nadu in the Rajya Sabha, the upper house of the Indian Parliament. He is the son of K. P. Kandasamy and grandson of S. P. Adithanar.
