= M. P. Sivagnanam =

Indian politician (1906-1995)

Mylai Ponnuswamy Sivagnanam
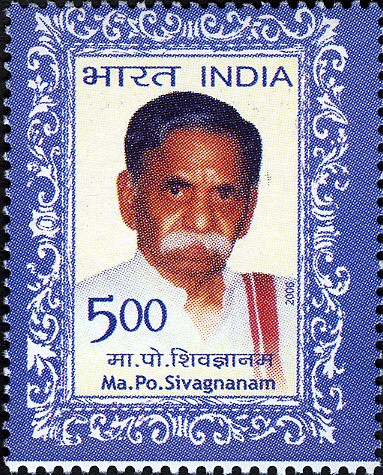
- Sivagnanam on a 2006 stamp of India
- Born: Mylai Ponnuswamy Sivagnanam; 26 June 1906; Chennai, Tamil Nadu
- Died: 3 October 1995 (aged 89); Chennai, Tamil Nadu
- Occupations: Journalist, poet
- Awards: Sahitya Akademi Award (1966)

Mylai Ponnuswamy Sivagnanam, popularly known as Ma.Po.Si. (26 June 1906 – 3 October 1995), was an Indian politician, freedom fighter, and the founder of the political party Tamil Arasu Kazhagam. He wrote more than 100 books.

== Biography ==
Ma.Po.Si. was born on 26 June 1906 of humble parentage in Salvankuppam in Thousand Lights of Madras City, to God –fearing Parents, Ponnuswamy and Sivagami a counterpart of the Nadars of the Southern Districts. For long, Sivagnanam was known as Sivagnanam Gramani, which denominational suffix he shed later. His early education was through his devout mother, and his school term ended at the commencement of Standard III, due to poverty, his father could not buy for him the class text books. Thereafter, the wide world was his school. Sivagnanam was the eldest of the surviving three of his parents’ ten children. Sivagnanam worked on daily wage for some time and later as a weaver for eight years. Subsequently, he started life as a compositor in the Press of a Tamil Journal.

He was elected to the Tamil Nadu Legislative Assembly from Thiyagarayanagar constituency contesting as a DMK contestant in 1967. His participation in the demarcation of Tamil Nadu has made him an important figure in the state’s history. It was through his efforts the state could retain Madras (now renamed as Chennai) and got Tiruttani from Andhra Pradesh (due to his 'the namade vs manade' agitation). He was the chairman (presiding officer) of Tamil Nadu Legislative Council when it was abolished by M. G. Ramachandran in 1986.

== Fight for Retention of Madras (Chennai) as Tamil Nadu state capital ==
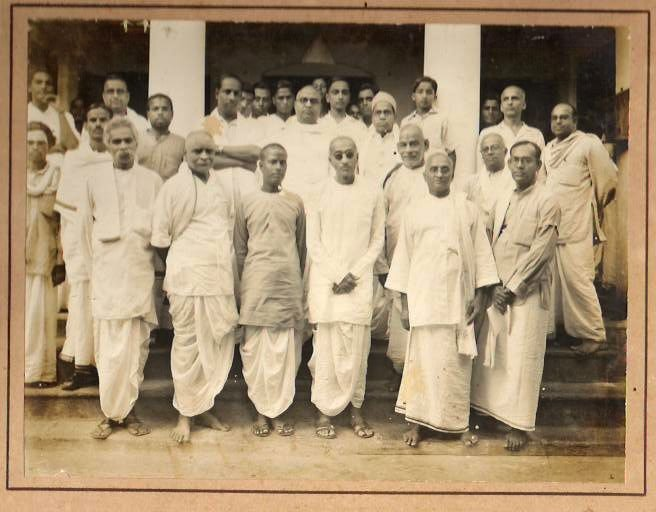
Ma. Po. Si. and Rajaji in center; Convention of the Mylai Tamil Sangam, early 1900s

Potti Sreeramulu started an agitation for separate Andhra Pradesh. As part of this 'Madras Manade' movement was started, asking for Madras to be the capital of separated Andhra Pradesh. Ma.Po.Si. through his Tamil Arasu Kazhagam agitated against Telugus' claim organising rallies, meetings and dharnas etc., saying 'தலை கொடுத்தேனும் தலைநகரைக் காப்போம்' (We will protect and save the capital for Tamils even if we have to part with our heads). Leaders like C. Rajagopalachari supported Ma.Po.Si.

Ma.Po.Si. went to meet Sreeramulu during his fast, due to the high respect he had on him, amidst political differences. Andhra Kesari Prakasam who was with Sreeramulu told Ma.Po.Si. that they want to keep Madras as their temporary capital. Ma.Po.Si. denied his request. Ma.Po.Si. through his Tamilasrasu Kazhagam held massive protests for want of Madras within Tamil Nadu. He was even imprisoned at times for this. Sreeramulu died during a fatal fast, which increased more sympathy towards Andhra's demand. 'Madras Manade' movement attained more momentum.

Nehru appointed Vansu, a Rajasthan-based justice to look into the Madras issue. Rajaji pressured Nehru saying if Madras was given to Andhra, he will resign from his post. Ma.Po.Si. submitted historical, literature facts to Vansu explaining the reason why he claims Thiruthani, Thirupathi, Madras to be grouped within Tamil Nadu. In between Nehru got an opportunity to read the famous speech Ma.Po.Si. rendered in Madras Corporation. Two thousand telegrams were sent to Nehru from Tamil Nadu, emphasizing the need for Madras within Tamil Nadu. Finally Madras was attached to Tamil Nadu by the great efforts of Ma.Po.Si.But Tirupati only left.

== Madras (Chennai) Corporation Symbol ==
During the British period the Madras Corporation flag had the 'sea, boat, 3 lions and 2 fishes'. The 3 lions represented the British and the sea, boat, fishes denoted the seashore of Madras. After Independence, the need for changing the flag arose. M.P.Sivagnanam who was heading the education wing of the corporation suggested the Pandiya, Chola, Chera’s symbol ‘Fish, Tiger and Bow’ (which he already had in his ‘Tamil arasu kazhagam’s flag). Rajaji agreed with his suggestion.

== Literature ==
An excerpt from Ma. Po. Si.'s book 'Arivuk kadhaigal'

=== Inspired by Subramanya Bharathi ===
It was in Amaravathi prison where Ma.Po.Si. started his literary journey. His interest to sangam literature was kindled by the words of Subramanya Bharathi. He claimed that the simple words of Bharathi acted as a tutor to take him to the next literary level. He attributed all his literary growth to Subramanya Bharathi.Ma.Po.Si. is one of the authors to have written about 10 research books on Bharathi.

Books written by Ma.Po.Si. on Subramanya Bharathi

- Vallalarum Bharathiyum (1965)
- Engal Kavi Bharathi (1953)
- Bharathiyum Aangilamum (1961)
- Bharathi Kanda Orumaipadu (1962)
- Ulaga Mahakavi Bharathi (1966)
- Bharathiyar Pathaiyile (1974)
- Bharathiyin Porkural (1979)
- Bharathy Patri Ma.Po.Si. Perurai (1983)
- Tholkappiathilirunthu Bharathi varai (1979)
- Ennai Valartha Bharathi (2013) by Vikraman

=== Silapathikaram ===
He started reading Silapathikaram and got induced into it. He took the morals dictated by Silapathikaram as his bible ad enforced his party's principles based on the same. He was the one, who pioneered spreading the merits of Silapathikaram. Ma.Po.Si.’s extensive research on Silapathikaram earned him the special title "Silambu Chelvar" by R. P. Sethu Pillai. His attraction towards this epic even made him name his daughters Kannagi and Madhavi.

Books written by Ma.Po.Si. on Silapathikaram

- Silappatikaramum Thamizharum (1947)
- Kannagi Vazhipadu (1950)
- Illangovin Silambu (1953)
- Veerakanagi (1958)
- Nenjaiallum Silappatikaram (1961)
- Madhaviyin Manbu (1968)
- Kovalan Kutravaliya (1971)
- Silappatikara Thiranaivu (1973)
- Silappatikara Yathirai (1977)
- Silappatikara Aayvurai (1979)
- Silappatikara Uraiasiriyargal Sirappu (1980)
- Silappatikarathil Yashum Esaiyum (1990)
- Silambil Edupatathu eppadi (1994)

==== Silapathikara Vizha ====
Ma.Po.Si. wanted to spread the merits of Silapathikaram throughout the world. He conducted the 'Silapathikara Vizha' in 1950 for the first time in Tamil History. It was held in Congress Grounds, Madras, Tamil Nadu.The ceremony consisted of eminent Tamil scholars from all Tamil parties. From 1950 onwards Ma.Po.Si.'s Tamil Arasu Kazhagam started celebrating the Silpathikara Vizha every year.

After Ma.Po.Si.'s demise, his daughter Ma.Po.Si. Madhavi Baskaran started celebrating Silapathigara Vizha in 2013, through a Trust run by her in the name of her father.

=== V.O. Chidambaram Pillai ===
Ma.Po.Si. brought out the contribution of V.O. Chidambaram Pillai to the masses. He wrote V.O.Chidambaram Pillai's biography and named it as 'Kappalottiya Thamizhan'. Later V.O.Chidambaram Pillai was remembered by all as 'Kappalottiya Thamizhan'. A Tamil movie named Kappalottiya Thamizhan directed by B.R.Panthulu was taken based on Ma.Po.Si.'s biography.

Books written by Ma.Po.Si. on V.O. Chidambaram Pillai

- Kappalottiya Thamizhan (1944)
- Kappalottiya Chidambaranar (1972)
- Thalapathy Chidambaranar (1950)

=== Veerapandiya Kattabomman ===
Ma.Po.Si. was instrumental in reviving the public interest of Kattabomman through his biography he wrote. Later a Tamil movie named 'Veerapandiya Kattabomman (film)' was made which made Kattaboman more popular. Ma.Po.Si. wrote the screenplay for this movie.

Books written by Ma.Po.Si. on Veerapandiya Kattabomman

- Veerapandiya Kattabomman (1949)
- Kayathatril Kattabomman (1950)
- Suthanthira Veeran Kattabomman (1950)

=== Thiruvalluvar ===
Books written by Ma.Po.Si. on Thiruvalluvar

- Thirukuralil Kalai Patri Kurathathen(1974)
- Valluvar Thantha Vazhi(1952)
- Thiruvalluvarum Karl Marxum(1960)

=== Books of Ma.Po.Si. translated in English ===
- The Great Patriot V.O. Chidambaram Pillai
- The First Patriot Veera Pandia Katta Bomman
- The Universal Vision of Saint Ramalinga

He was the editor of "Senkol" which became the vehicle of his ideas on matters of political and literary.

In 1966, he was awarded the Sahitya Akademi Award for Tamil for his biography of Vallalar – Vallalar kanda orumaipaadu. In 1972, Government of India awarded him Padma Shri for Literature & Education.

== Educational service ==
- 1952–53 Chairman, Education Committee, Corporation of Madras.
- 1952–54 Member, Senate of Madras University
- 1957–69 Member, Senate of Madurai Kamaraj University
- 1972–76 Member, Syndicate of Madras University
- 1978 Member, Senate of Annamalai University
- 1981 Delivered Convocation Address in the Rural University, Gandhigram, Tamil Nadu
- Chairman of several committees, commissions constituted by the Madras University .

Various books written by him such as Veerapandia Kattabomman, Kappalottiyathamizhan, Vallalar Kanda Orumaippaadu, KambanKaviyinbam, Kalingaththu parani, Bharathiyaarin Paadhaiyile etc., have been prescribed as text books for High Schools, colleges and as Reference books for Post-Graduates courses.

== Library movement ==
- 1952–54 Chairman, Madras District Local Library Authority
- 1970–73 Chairman, Madras District Local Library Authority, 2nd time
- 1972–74 Member, Tamil Nadu State Local Library Authority Responsible for the creation of separate department and Director for Librariesin Tamil Nadu and also for increasing the Library Cess from 3 paise to 5 paise.

== Visits abroad ==
- 1948 First visited Ceylon and toured for 28 days
- 1956 Visited Burma and toured for 18 days
- 1964–65 Visited Malaysia and Singapore twice
- 1965 Visited Kulalampur and participated as the representative of Government of Tamil Nadu in the World Tamil Conference held at Kulalumpur
- 1970 Participated as the representative of Government of Tamil Nadu in The World Tamil Conference held at Paris
- 1970 Visited Soviet Union and toured for seven days at the invitation of Soviet Union
- 1970 Visited London and stayed for three days on his way back to India from Paris and studied the working of Library Movement and Police Administration
- 1986 Visited London and United States of America for over three weeks.Toured various places in America and participated in World Peace Conference in Virginia

== Awards and honours ==
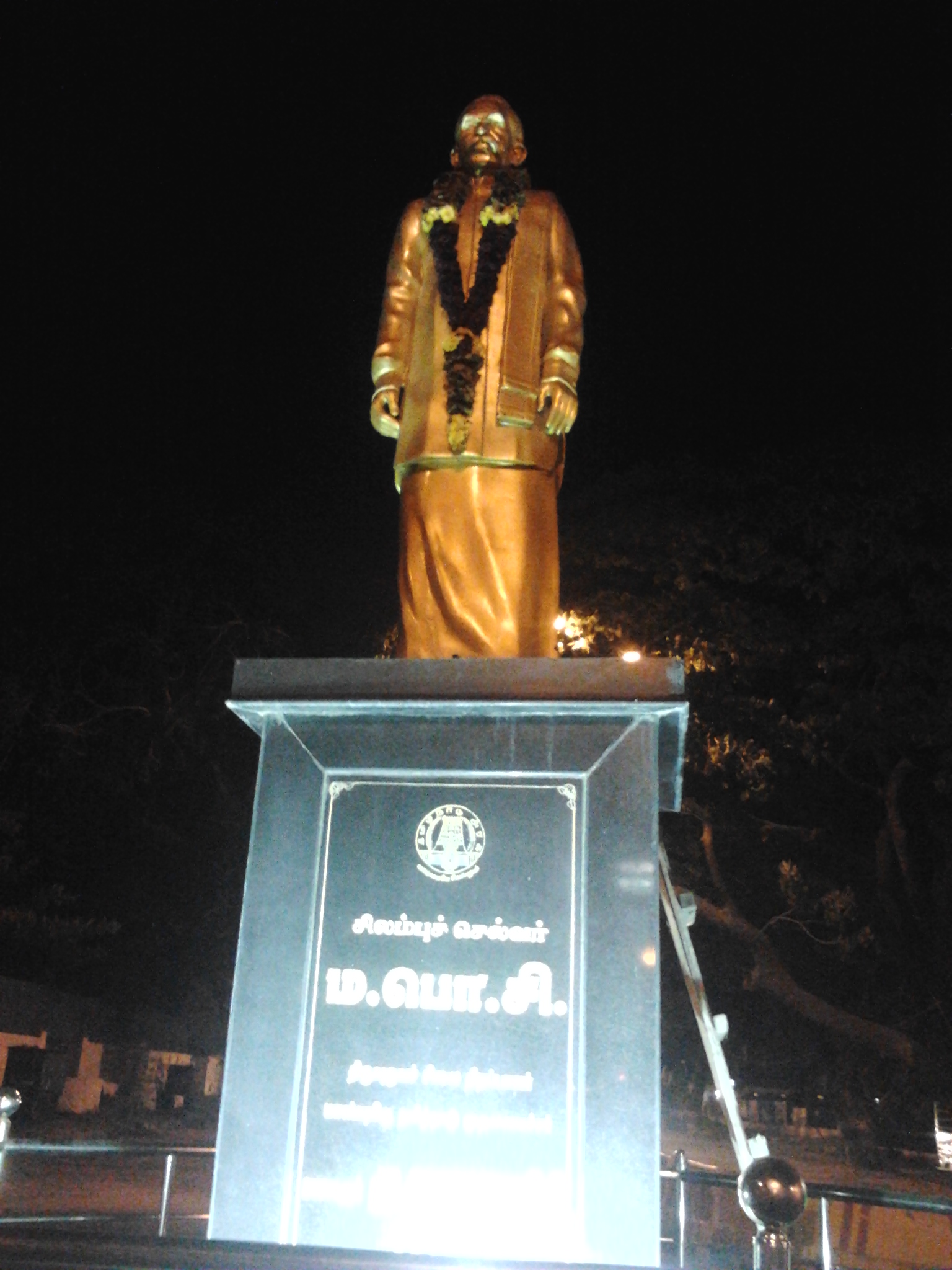
Statue of Ma. Po. Sivagnanam in Chennai

- 1950 Awarded title "Silambu Selvar" by Prof. R.P.Sethupillai
- 1966 "Sahithya Academy Award" for the book written by him Vallalarkanda Orumaipadu
- 1970 Award given by UNESCO Mandram, Madras during International Education Year
- 1972 ‘Padmashri’ Award by the President of India
- 1976 ‘Kalaimamani’ title by Tamil Nadu Iyal, Isai, Nataka Mandram, Madras
- 1979 “Doctor of Literature” by the University of Madras
- 1979 “Doctor of Literature” by the Annamalai University, Chidambaram, Tamil Nadu
- 1980 Tamil Nadu Government has awarded a prize for the book written by his namely, "Enathu Porattam" containing 1200 pages. This book was released by the erstwhile President of India Thiru. V.V.Giri.
- 1985 The book " Viduthalai Poril Thamizhagam" was nationalized by the Tamil Nadu Government
- 1985 Award of ‘Peravai chemmal’ by Madurai Kamarajar University
- 2006 Hon'ble Chief Minister of Tamil Nadu Dr. Kalaignar M. Karunanidhi on 15 August Tuesday 2006 released commemorative postage stamp issued by the Department of Posts on freedom fighter and Tamil scholar Silambu Chelvar M.P. Sivagnanam (Ma.Po.Si.) .
- 2006 Books of Ma.Po.Si. Nationalized by the Tamil Nadu Government.
- 2011 Statue of Ma.Po.Si. unveiled in Thyagaraya Nagar (T.Nagar, Chennai)

== See also ==
- List of Sahitya Akademi Award winners for Tamil
- List of Indian writers
- List of Tamil-language writers
