= Malai Murasu =

Indian newspaper

- Type: Daily newspaper
- Format: Tabloid
- Political alignment: Socialism and Liberal Conservatism
- Language: Tamil
- Country: India
- Website: www.malaimurasu.com

Malai Murasu (Tamil: மாலை முரசு) is a Tamil language evening daily newspaper in Tamil Nadu, India by Ramachandra Adithyan. The current director is Kannan Adityan.

== History ==
B. Ramachandra Adityan worked as the managing director for 50 years before dying in 2013. A road in Adyar, Chennai was named after him in 2015.
