= Tamil Arasu Kazhagam =

Indian political party

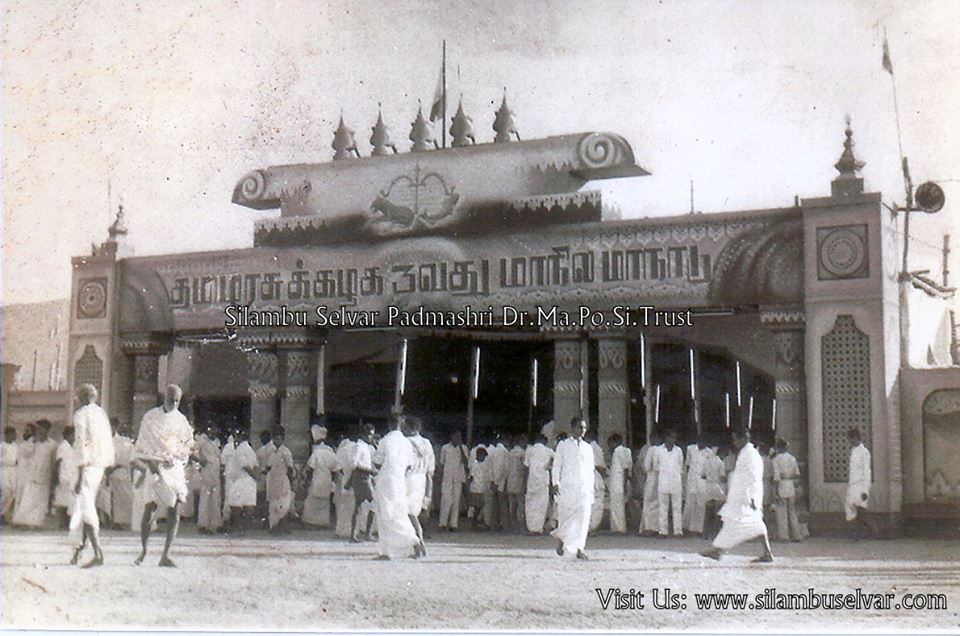
Tamil Arasu Kazhaga Manadu

Tamil Arasu Kazhagam (Association for Tamil Autonomy) (Tamil: தமிழ் அரசு கழகம்) was an Indian political party founded by M. P. Sivagnanam (Ma. Po. Si) in Tamil Nadu. It was established as an association in 1946. Its goals were to pressurize the Indian National Congress Government of the Madras Presidency to increase the use of Tamil in administration and education, to create an autonomous Tamil state out of a composite Madras Presidency and to soften the pro-Hindi stance of the Congress. The association was allied with the Congress during 1946–54 and worked against the Dravidian Movement. However, it grew closer to the Dravida Munnetra Kazhagam (DMK) over time. During 1946–54, Sivagnanam was a member of the Congress. He left the Congress in 1954 and turned the Tamil Arasu Kazhagam into an independent political party. During 1957–60, it was involved in various protests over the drawing of state boundaries when Andhra Pradesh split from the composite Madras State. It eventually became a part of DMK's electoral alliance in the 1967 assembly elections. It was also involved in the movements to change the name of the state from Madras State to Tamil Nadu and to promote the use of Tamil over Sanskrit for conducting Archanai (Offerings to God) in Hindu temples. In the 1967 elections, two candidates of the party (including Sivagnanam) were elected to the assembly contesting under DMK's "Rising Sun" Symbol. The party was also a DMK ally in the 1971 assembly elections. In 1972, it opposed the DMK chief minister M. Karunanidhi's decision to scrap prohibition laws and switched its allegiance to DMK's splinter group – the M. G. Ramachandran led Anna Dravida Munnetra Kazhagam (ADMK). The party did not directly contest in elections after 1971 and Sivagnanam was nominated to the Tamil Nadu Legislative Council in 1972. He remained as the member of the legislative council till its disbandment in 1986. The party stopped functioning after Sivagnanam's death in 1995.

== Formation ==
On 21 November 1946, Ma.Po.Si called for an informal meeting at 'Tamil Murasu' office, Linghi Chetty Street, Madras. Popular participants in the crowd of youths were Thiru.V.Kalayasundaram, T.P.Meenakshisundaram, Mu.Va and Anbu Ganapathy. After a prolonged discussion,'Tamil Arasu Kazhagam' was formed with Ma.Po.Si elected as its leader.

== Ideology ==
The idea of 'Tamil Arasu Kazhagam', was stressing the necessity of forming an autonomous Tamil State in Independent India to promote Tamil language and culture.

The idea of 'Tamil State ‘ was composed of the following features:

- 1.Citizenship

All the natives who consider Tamil Nadu as their mother-land and other settlers who speak Tamil as their mother-tongue would be treated as Tamil citizens.

- 2.Territory

The contiguous areas where Tamils live in large numbers would form the territory of Tamil State with Cape Comorin and Tirupathi as its southern and northern boundary respectively.

- 3.State

Representatives elected by an electorate based on the principle of universal suffrage would frame the constitution of the Tamil State

- 4.Socialism

The economic policy would be socialism. It would be enforced scientifically in the context of the Tamil Society and culture.

- 5.Official Language

Tamil would be the official language in every field of activity. Nevertheless, the option would be given to every citizen to learn any other language.

- 6.Religion

Neutrality in ecclesiastical affairs.

- 7.Society

Upliftment of the oppressed and the backward communities. Social apartheid in any form would be punishable within the limits of law.

- 8.Arts

Secular arts would be patronized

== Prominent Leaders ==
E. S. Thiyagaraja Mudaliar: Former Tirutyani MLA.
