= Dina Thanthi =

Indian Tamil newspaper

Dina Thanthi Daily Thanthi

- Front page of Daily Thanthi on 12 July 2012
- Type: Newspaper
- Format: Broadsheet
- Founder: S. P. Adithanar
- Publisher: Dina Thanthi
- Founded: 1 November 1942
- Political alignment: Socialism and Liberal Conservatism
- Language: Tamil
- Headquarters: Chennai, Tamil Nadu, India
- Circulation: 1,137,041 Daily (as of April 2023)
- Website: www.dailythanthi.com

Dina Thanthi (Tamil: தினத்தந்தி, English: Daily Mail; known as Daily Thanthi in English) is a Tamil language daily newspaper. It was founded by S. P. Adithanar in Madurai in 1942. Dina Thanthi is India's largest daily printed in the Tamil language and the ninth largest among all dailies in India by circulation. It is printed in 16 cities across India and also prints an international edition in Dubai and Sri Lanka. The Daily Thanthi group has ventured into the general entertainment sector with the launch of its new channel, Thanthi One, on 19 May 2024.

== History ==
Dina Thanthi was established in Madurai on 1 November 1942 by lawyer, politician and editor S. P. Adithanar.

== Circulation ==
This daily newspaper is published from 16 cities in India namely Bangalore, Chennai, Mumbai, Pondicherry, Coimbatore, Cuddalore, Dindigul, Erode, Madurai, Nagercoil, Salem, Thanjavur, Tiruchirappalli, Tirunelveli, Tirupur and Vellore. In the second half of 2015, the newspaper has a circulation of 1,714,743.

International edition is printed in Dubai, United Arab Emirates for the Middle East market.

Another international edition is printed at Colombo in Sri Lanka, issued along with Virakesari (Sri Lanka Tamil newspaper).

== Circulation by editions ==
Edition	Average
Chennai	498,188
Madurai	127,182
Coimbatore	123,910
Vellore	67,981
Trichy	102,751
Tirunelveli	132,083
Salem	125,528
Cuddalore	68,811
Bangalore	62,040
Puducherry	30,536
Erode	57,552
Nagercoil	108,571
Thanjavur	94,754
Dindigul	52,290
Tirupur	43,119
Mumbai	19,447

== Awards ==
In 2005, the central Government conferred the Padma Shri award to the managing director of Dinathanti, Sivanthi Adithan, for his excellent work in educating the poor.

In order to improve the educational quality of the poor students, the daily newspaper is giving educational grants to the students who are studying in the top 3 positions in the 10th plus-2 classes. Tamil Nadu Scholars are honored by giving prize money and gold medal every year in C. Pa. Aditanar's birthday function.

== Supplements ==
Various supplements also come along with Daily Thanthi, as follows:

Day	Supplements
Sunday	Devathai Book, Gnayiru mlr (2 Full pages) & Kudumba mlr (2 Full pages)
Monday	Manavar special (Full Page)
Tuesday	Aruldharum Anmeegam Book
Wednesday	VANAVIL (Full Page)
Saturday	Muthucharam (2 Full pages), Ilaignar Malar (2 Full pages) & Mugavari (real-estate and construction technology news)

It also carries a special supplement and conducts programmes for students to prepare for board and other competitive exams.

== See also ==
- Maalai Malar
- Thanthi TV
- Hello FM
- DT Next
- Thanthi One
- Ranionline
