= Sittanavasal Cave =

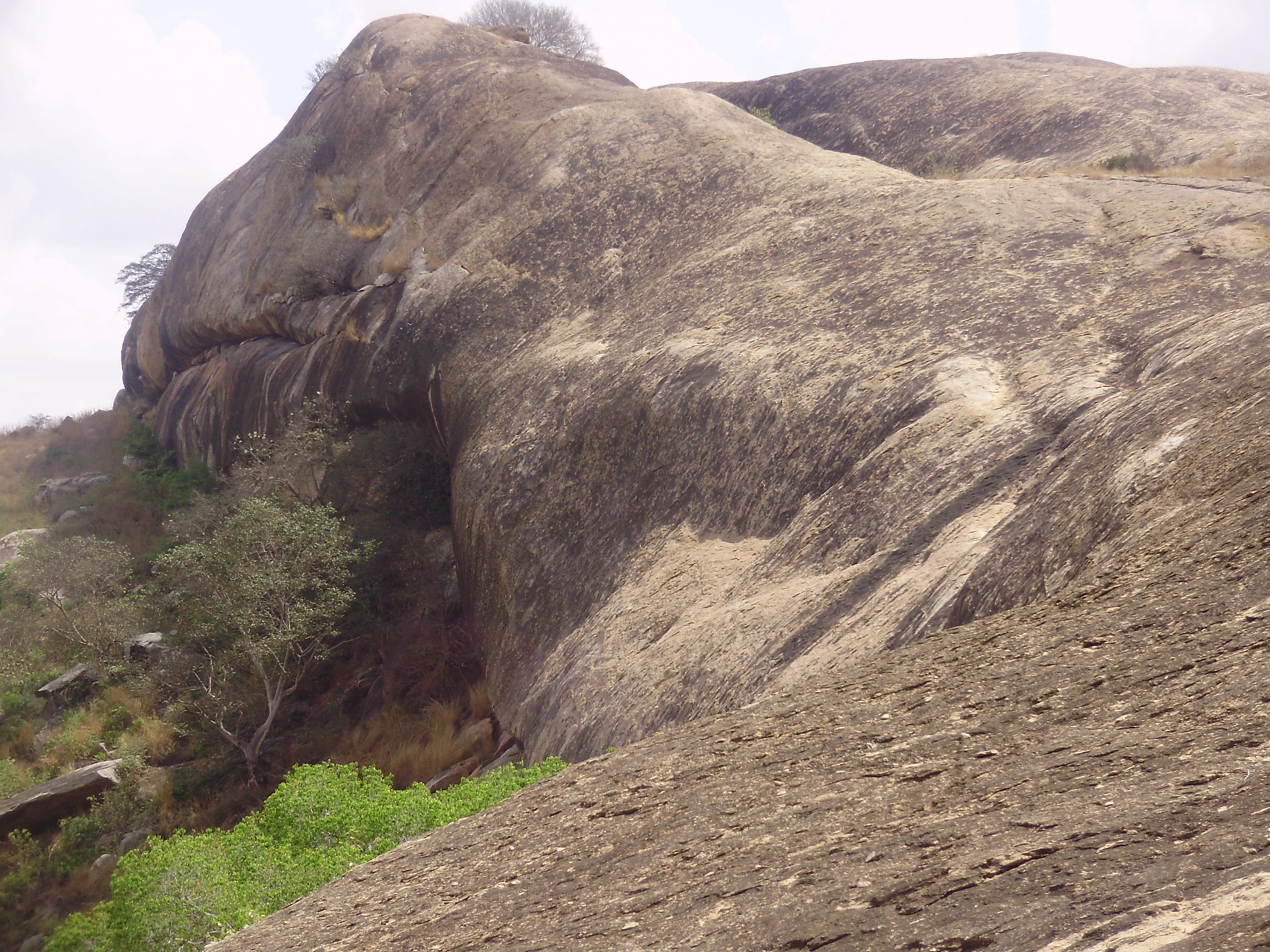
- Sittanavasal Cave

- Sittanavasal in Tamil Nadu, India
- 10.4544°N 78.7247°E
- Location: Sittanavasal village, Pudukottai district, Tamil Nadu, India

History
- Built: Śramaṇa Period (2nd century BCE - 900 CE)

Site notes
- Architectural style: Pandyan

Sittanavasal Cave (also, Arivar Koil) is a 2nd-century Tamil Śramaṇa complex of caves in Sittanavasal village in Pudukottai district of Tamil Nadu, India. Its name is a distorted form of Sit-tan-na-va-yil, a Tamil word which means "the abode of great saints" (Tamil: சித்தன்னவாசல்).

The monument is a rock-cut monastery or temple. Created by Tamil Śramaṇa, it is called the Arivar Koil, and is a rock cut cave temple of the Arihants. It contains remnants of notable frescoes from the 7th century. The murals have been painted with vegetable and mineral dyes in black, green, yellow, orange, blue, and white. Paintings have been created by applying colours over a thin wet surface of lime plaster.

Ancient structures such as Gol Gumbaz, Talagirisvara temple and this one are claimed to be relatively unappreciated. Archaeological Survey of India has listed Sittanavasal Cave in the list of "Must See" Indian Heritage.

The Sittanavasal Cave are listed as one of the Adarsh Smarak Monument by Archaeological Survey of India.

== History ==
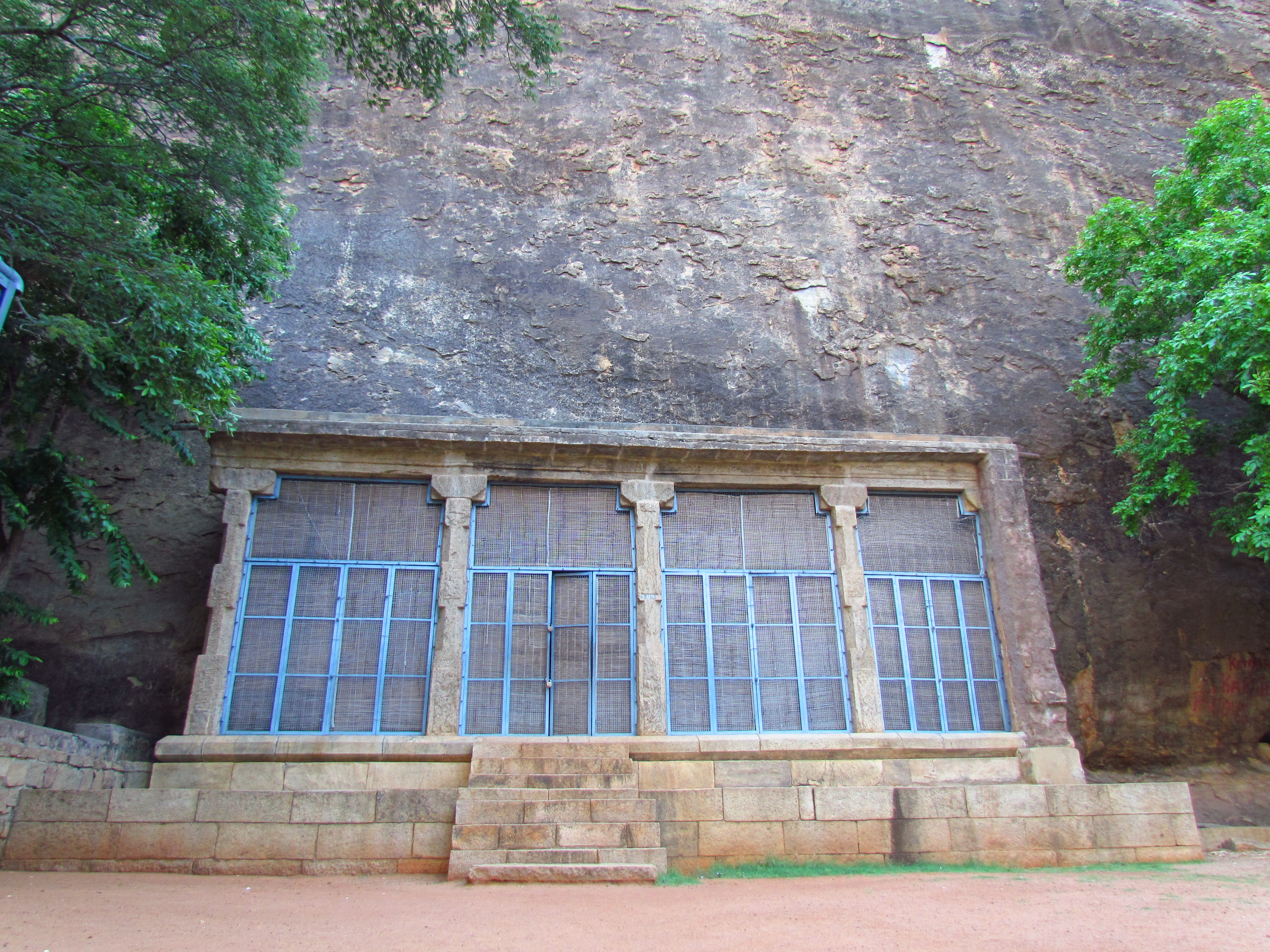
Sittanvasal Cave temple

While the Sittanavasal village is dated from 1st century BC to 10th century AD when Jainism flourished here, the Temple-cave was initially dated to Pallava King Mahendravarman I (580–630 AD) prior to his conversion from Jainism to Hinduism as a Shaivite. However, an inscription attributes its renovation to a Pandyan king probably Maran Sendan (654–670 AD) or Arikesari Maravarman (670–700 AD). The Śramaṇa beds on the hill top is attributed to the Jain era pilgrimage centre which lasted till the 9th century AD. However, in the Pudukkottai region, where the monuments are located, there are many archaeological finds of the megalithic burial sites from much earlier.

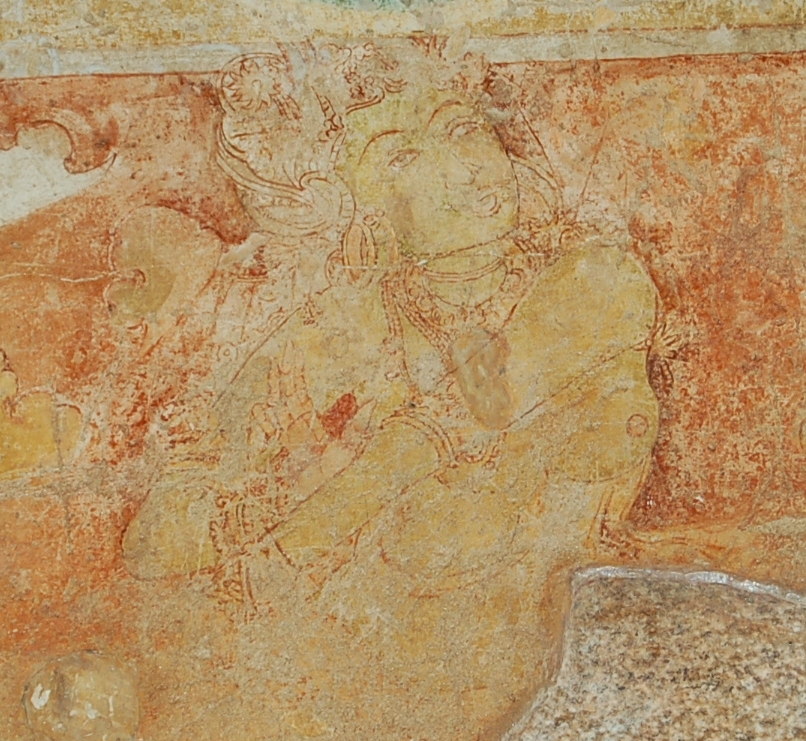
Seventh-century painting in Sittanavasal Cave

There are two publications in the 20th century which brought to light these monuments in particular: one in 1916, in the book "General History of the Pudukkottai State" by S. Radhakrishna Iyer, a historian, but only known regionally; and the other by Jouveau-Dubreuil and Gopinatha Rao, iconographers who worked together and brought out a "Monograph on Sittannavasal", in 1920, which brought it to limelight among archaeologists worldwide. The cleaning of the painting was undertaken in 1942 by Dr. S. Paramasivan and K. R. Srinivasan when they observed a patch of old painting of conventional carpet design superimposed by a new layer of painting. The superimposed layer of painting has been surmised as that done Ilan-Gautaman, whose name is also inscribed. The temple is maintained and administered by the Archaeological Survey of India as a ticketed monument.

== Architectural features ==
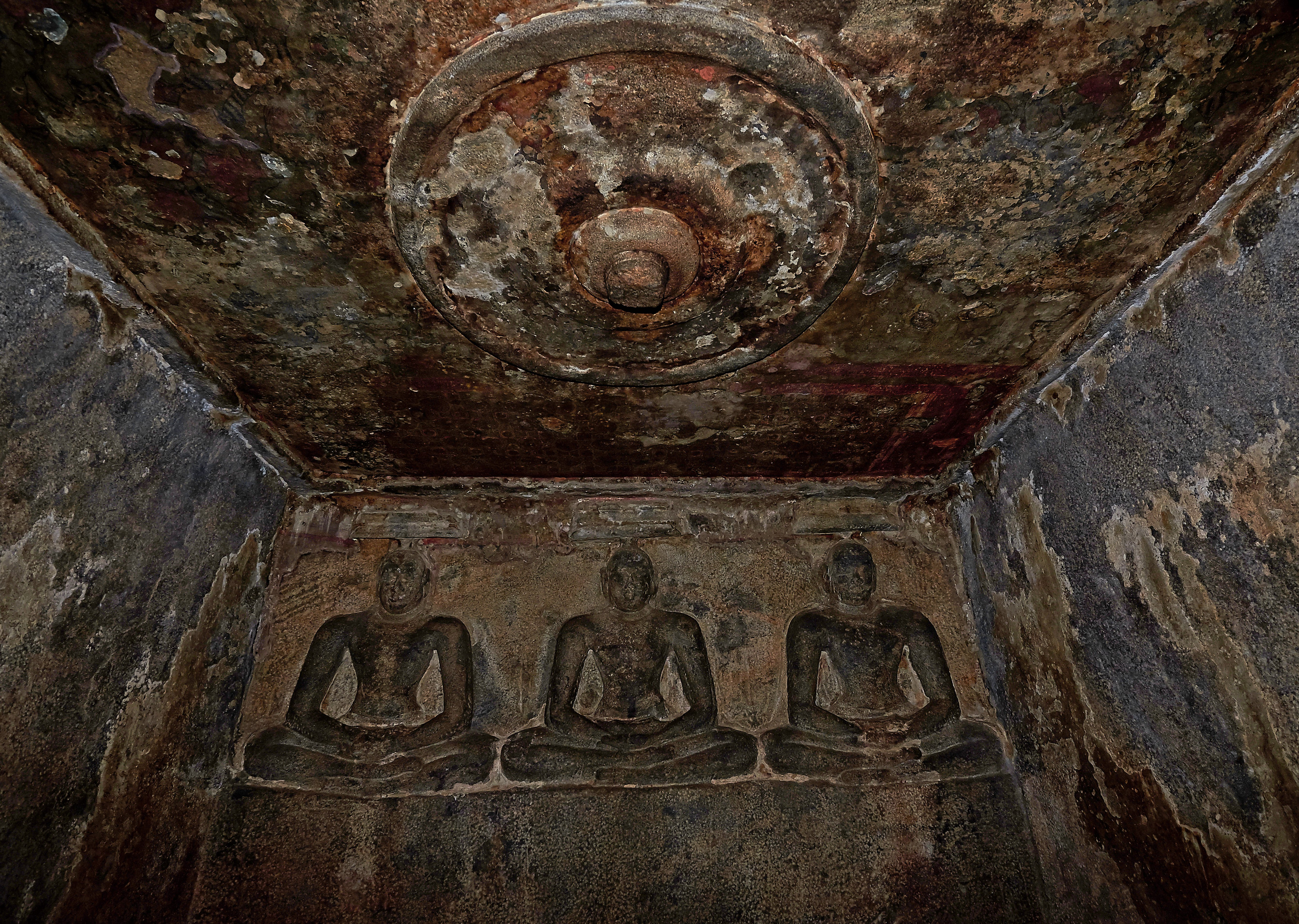
Tirthanakar image on wall

Sittanavasal is a rock-cut cave, situated on the western side of central part of a hill, which runs in a north–south direction. The hill measures approximately 70 metres (230 ft) in height, and sits above the surrounding plain which has some archaeological monuments. The Jain natural caverns, called Ezhadippattam are approached from the foothills. The cave is approached by climbing a few 100 steps.

The architectural features of the Sittanvasal Cave include the painting and sculptures found within its precincts. Archaeological Survey of India is responsible for the maintenance of the cave and the Jain beds.

The paintings have been painted in fresco-secco technique with many mineral colours. The painting depict beautiful lotus pond with lotus flowers, people collecting lotuses from the pond, two dancing figures, lilies, fish, geese, buffaloes and elephants. Mulk Raj Anand said of the paintings, "Pallava craftsmen used greens and browns and puqiles, with a genuine ability and a lyrical flow of line. Lotuses spring up from imaginary ponds amid variegated greenery, under a bluish sheen." In addition, inscriptions of the 9th and 10th century are also seen. The ceiling of the Ardhamandapam is decorated with murals from the 7th century. The cave temple has simple pillars and sculptures of Jain Tirthankaras. However, most of the frescoes which were covered fully in plaster have been severely defaced or not clearly visible due to inadequate security and maintenance resulting in vandalism in the past five or six decades. Originally, the entire cave temple, including the sculptures, was covered with plaster and painted. The paintings are with theme of Jain Samavasarana, the "most attractive heavenly pavilion" (it means the attainment of nirvana), and Khatika bhumi.

The layout of the west facing cave is the same as adopted in other rock-cut cave temples in the country during the 7th Century. As originally built, it had only a garbha-griha (sanctum sanctorum) and an ardhamandapam (semi hall). However, the mukha-mandapa (front hall) was an addition made in the frontage built during the Pandya Rule, which collapsed. Subsequently, a pillared veranda with a facade was added in front of the cave during the 20th century; the Maharaja of Pudukkottai added this part of structure at the suggestion of Tottenham, the British administrator. It has two pillars and two pilasters and a square base entrance to a hexagonal portico, which were brought from the ruins of mantapas at Kudimiyanmalai.

The Ardhamantapam, after the front entrance, is rectangular in plan of 20.5 metres (67 ft) long, 2.28 metres (7 ft 6 in) wide and 2.5 metres (8 ft 2 in) high, and the cubical cell of2.89 metres (9 ft 6 in) width, (a little higher than the garbha-griha) with a facade which has two pillars and two pilasters at both ends. The pillars as well as pilasters are hexagonal in shape in the middle section while the top and bottom sections are square. Rock beam is sculpted above them as if supporting them; provided with large corbels (potikai in Tamil) with ornamentation or fluting, with an intervening plain band. The pillars which support this mandapam are typical of Mahendra-order. The entry into the garbha-griha is flanked by two niches, which also have smaller size pilasters, similar to the pillar design, with bold relief of lotus medallions carved on them. In the southern and northern sides of the ardhamantapam, niches are provided where the 23rd tirthankara Parsvanatha and a Jain acharya (teacher) are respectively carved in bas-relief. Parsvanatha is shown seated in "the dhyana (meditative) pose, cross-legged, with the hands placed one over the other, palms upwards, resting on the folded legs", a five-hooded serpent sheltering his head. An inscription on a pillar to the niche reads [Ulo]kaditan ("ruler of the world"), indicating Parsvanatha's divinity. The acharya is in a similar posture as Parsvanatha but with an umbrella over his head. The inscription below this niche reads Tiruvasiriyan ("great teacher").

A door way of 5.5 feet (1.7 m) height and 2.5 feet (0.76 m) width from the ardhamantapa leads to the sanctum sanctorum (through a flight of steps), which has three bas-relief sculptures. The entrance has surul-vyalis (balustrades sculptured with the mythical form of vyalis with twisted trunks). The sanctum sanctorum has a square plan of 2.89 feet (0.88 m) wide and height of 7.5 feet (2.3 m), and at the back wall there are three bas-reliefs, two are of Jain Tirthankaras (as evidenced by the triple umbrellas (chatris) over them) and the third relief is of an acharya (teacher). The ceiling of the garbha-griha which is painted shows a carved wheel with hub and axle that denotes the Dharma-chakra ("Wheel-of-the-Law"). Above the three images in Lotus position (seated posture), paintings are also seen which are surmised to represent a canopy which is carved with carpet designs with striped borders and squares and circles of different sizes with louts flower designs inscribed within the squares. The circles depict crosses with bulbous ends; the horizontal arm of the cross has depictions of human and lion figures. In the other areas, the ceiling has similar paintings as the lotus pond in the ardhamantapam. Plastered walls of the Sittanavasal Cave have varying thickness of 1–8 millimetres (0.039–0.315 in). The pigmentation used for the paintings is over 1000 years old. Echo effect is clearly heard, if "om" is recited, only if inaudibly, in the small shrine.

== Paintings ==
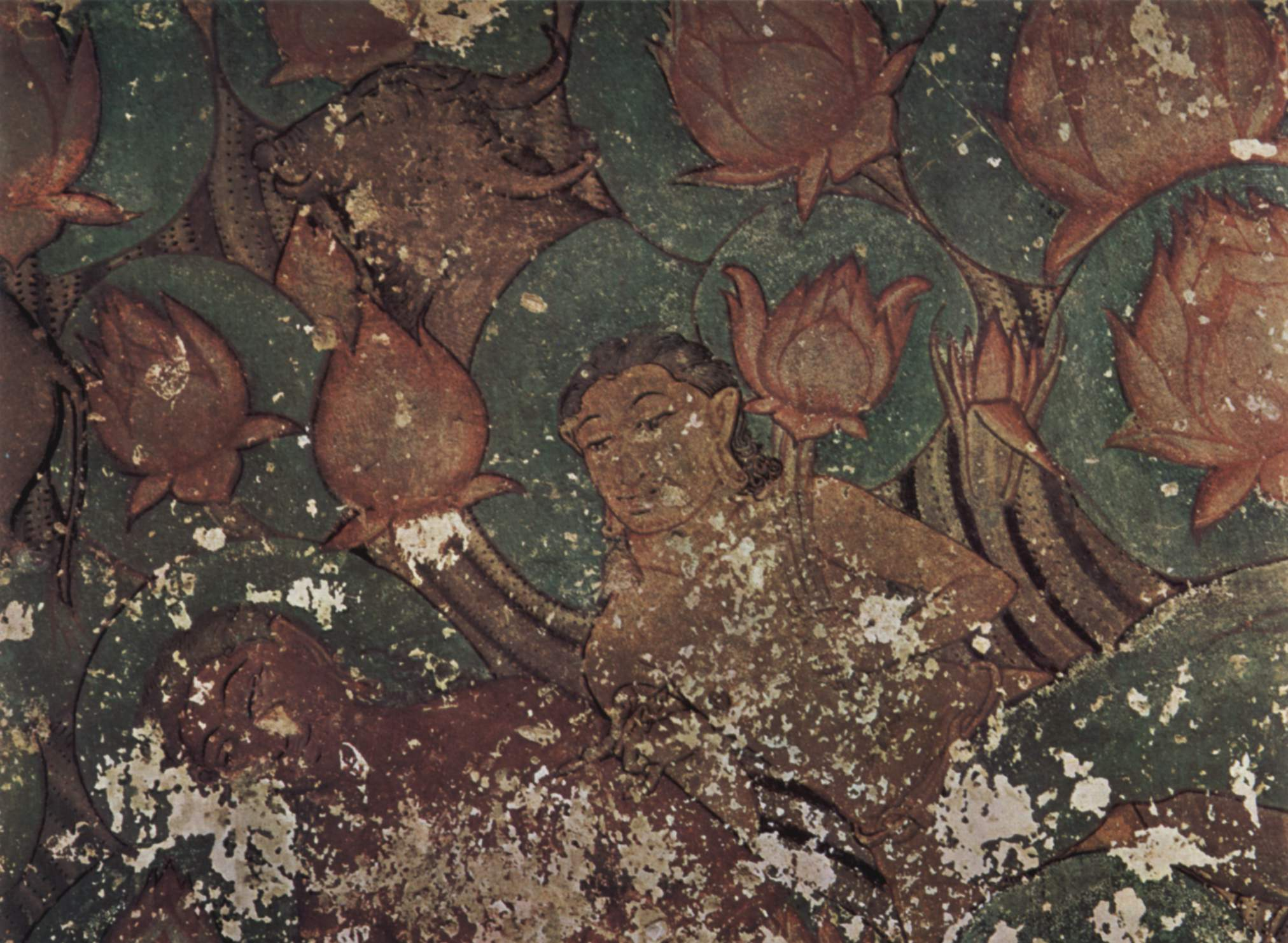
Painting on the roof of the Sittanvasal Cave

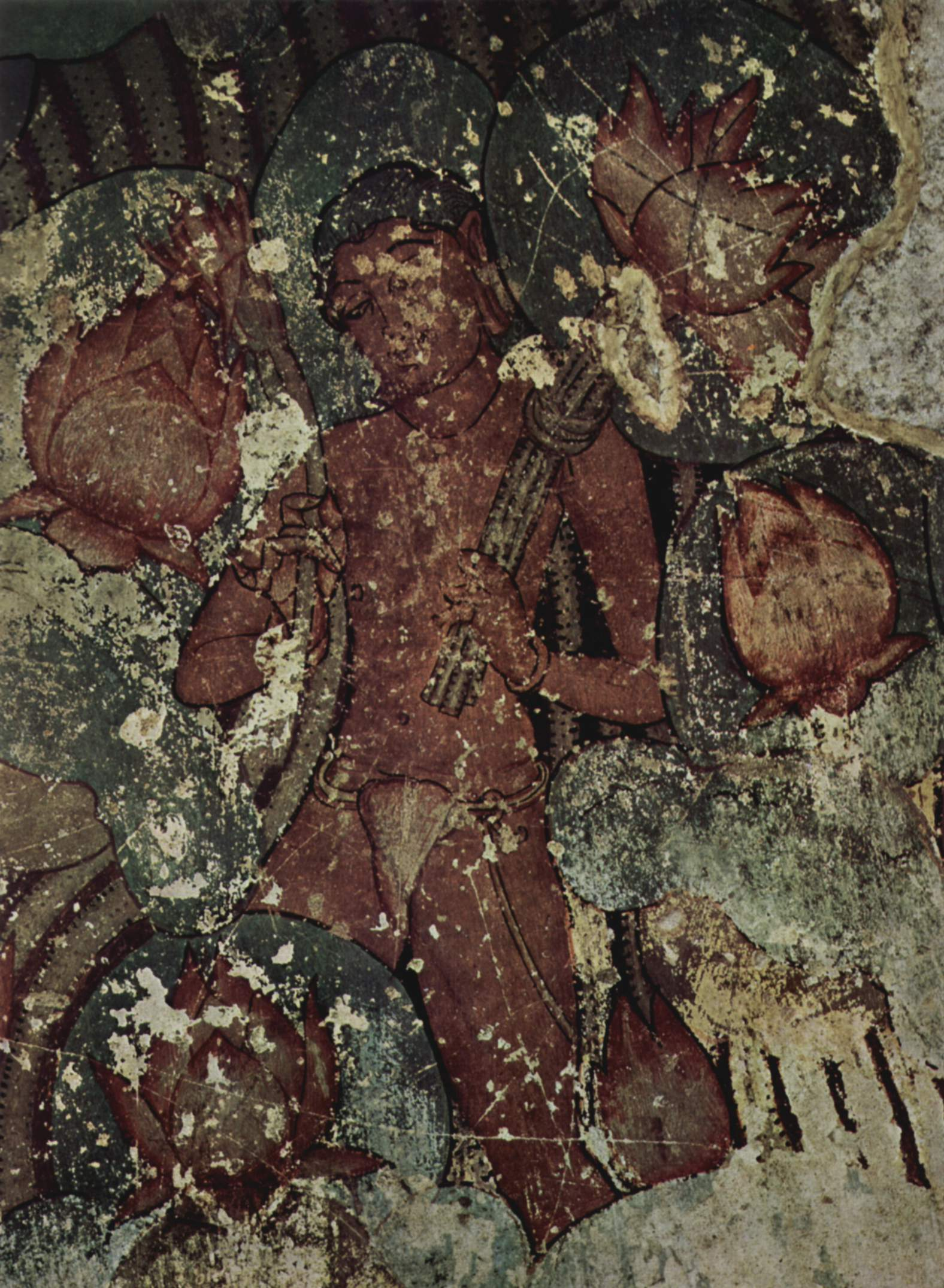
Painting on the roof of the Sittanvasal Cave

The decorative paintings in the ceiling of the sanctum and ardha-mandapam of Aravirkovil though compared to the classical cave painting styles used in the Ajanta Caves but have minor variations in use of the materials for creating the paintings and also reported to provide a link between the Ajanta paintings (4th–6th century AD) and the Chola paintings of 11th century at Thanjavur. The ceilings have depiction of a lotus tank with natural looking images of men, animals, flowers, birds and fishes representing the Samavasarana faith of Jainism. The pillars are also carved with dancing girl and the king and the queen.

Paintings in the roof of the Ardhamnatapa are the mural paintings with Samavasarana theme. The mural exhibits a water tank or khatika-bhumi which is shown with the tank made of tiles filled with lotus flowers and surrounded by bhavyas ("the faithful"), elephants, fishes, one fish shown as jumping out of water, pillars with figurines of Pandya king Srimara Srivallabha (9th century AD) and his queen offering reverence to Ilam Gautaman, an acharya of Madura who created these paintings. While cleaning the paintings, one more layer of Samavasarana themed painting was revealed in the ceiling of the Garbha-griha, but in a carpet-design.

The study done by an artist on the depictions of the roof painting panel reveals: 3 birds, a man in loin cloth plucking flowers and the man is shown with a lily on right hand and lotuses on left hand, an elephant and fishes swimming, bird's eye on the top left corner.

Though severely damaged due to vandalism, remaining Frescoes have been preserved on the top parts of columns and ceilings inside the temple. Many of them are typical of the 9th century Pandyan period and include detailed pictures of elephants, buffaloes, fish, geese, Jains gathering lotuses from a pond and dancing girls. These frescoes are considered to be some of the best frescoes of medieval India next to frescoes of Ajanta Caves and Bagh Caves. Not so well planned is the arrangement of panels of the Sittanvassal cave temple; the idea of an ensemble has not been adopted but arranged in a haphazard way.

Painting of the Sittanvasal Caves were analysed to establish the technique and the material used to make the. Analysing a painting of a lotus pond in the ardhamantpam, it has been inferred that they are made with Fresco-secco, techniques made over rough stone using rough plaster of 2.5 millimetres (0.098 in) thickness made of lime mortar and sand with minor impurities, applying 0.5 millimetres (0.020 in) thick lime wash of fine lime water when the rough lime plaster is still rough. The pigments used are composed of white made from lime, black made from wood charcoal or lamp black, yellow from yellow ochre, red from red ochre, blue from ultramarine\lapis lazuli, and green from terre verte. Pigments of permanent mineral colours (not vegetable colours as reported on the display plaque at the site by ASI) were applied over dry plaster surfaces without any adhesive grove; the process involved a chemical reaction of lime water which absorbed oxygen in the air and getting converted by a carbonisation process into insoluble calcium carbonate, which enabled the pigments to adhere to the surface. At the initiative of Pudukkottai State, during 1937–39, the paintings were cleaned, and then given a preservative coating. Also, the damaged portions of the plastering were injected with cementing material and the paintings were also retouched.

The condition of paintings are deteriorating.

== Gallery ==
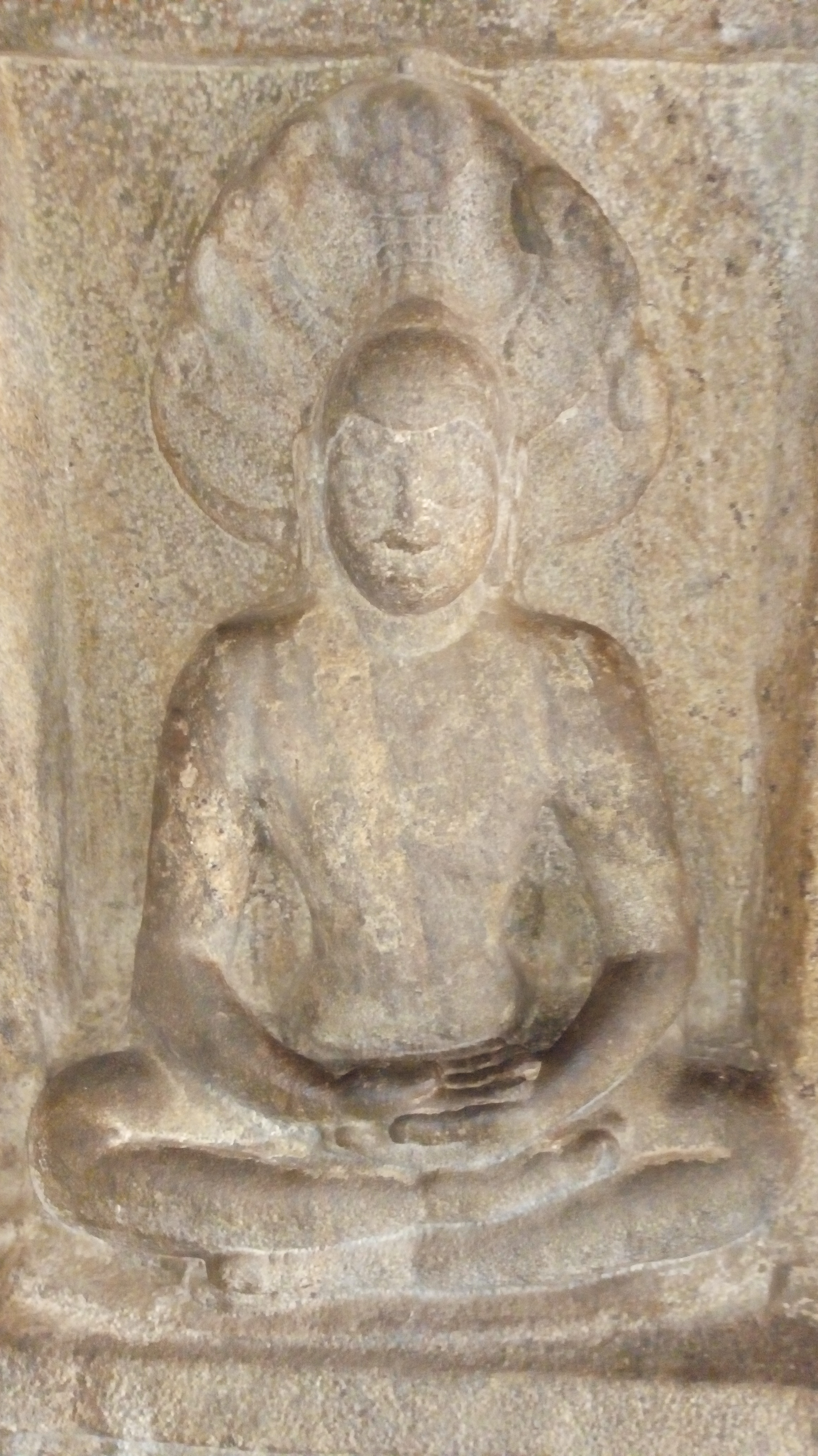
Parshva

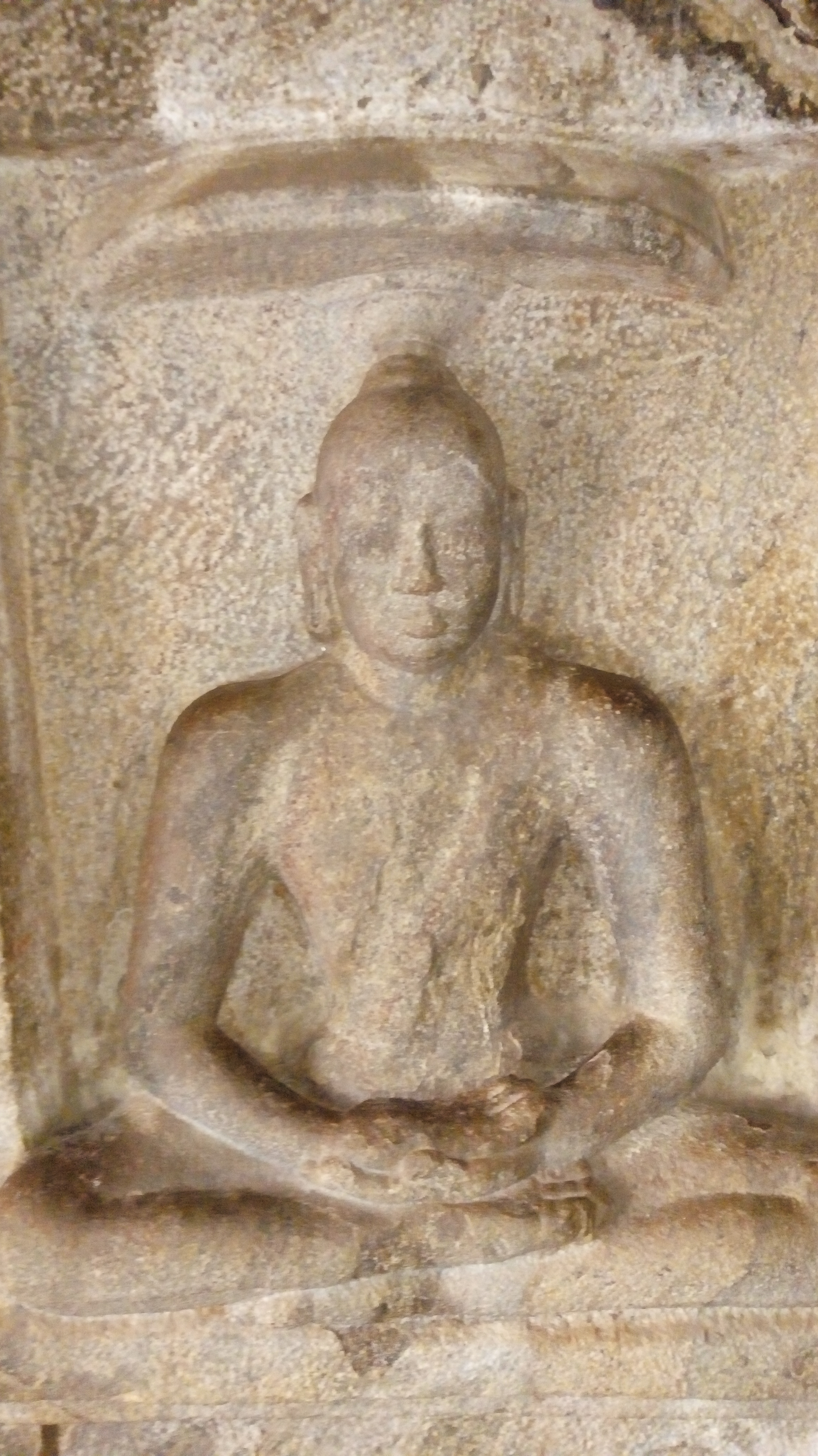
A Jain image

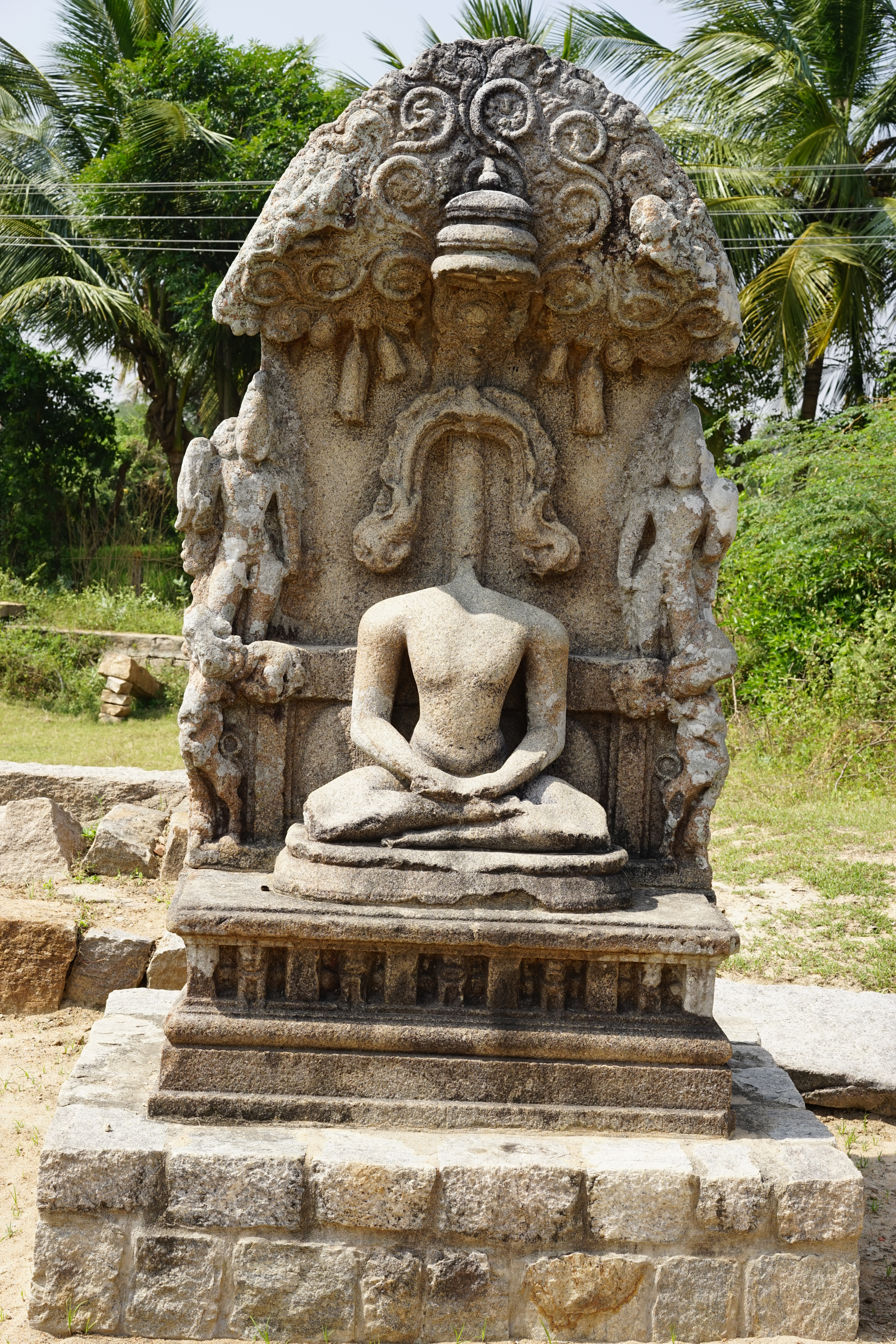
Tirthankar sculpture

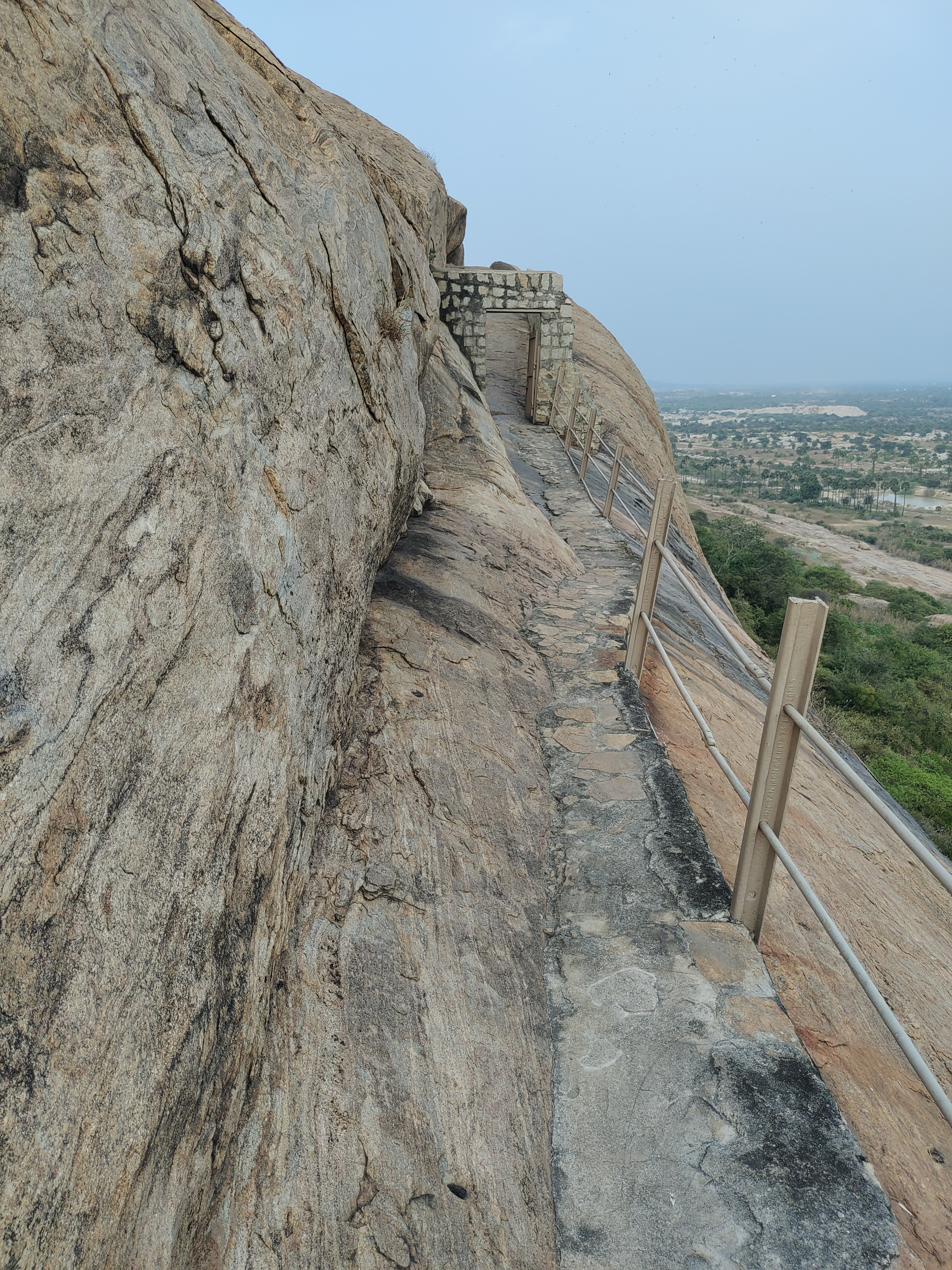
Passage leading to Rock Beds

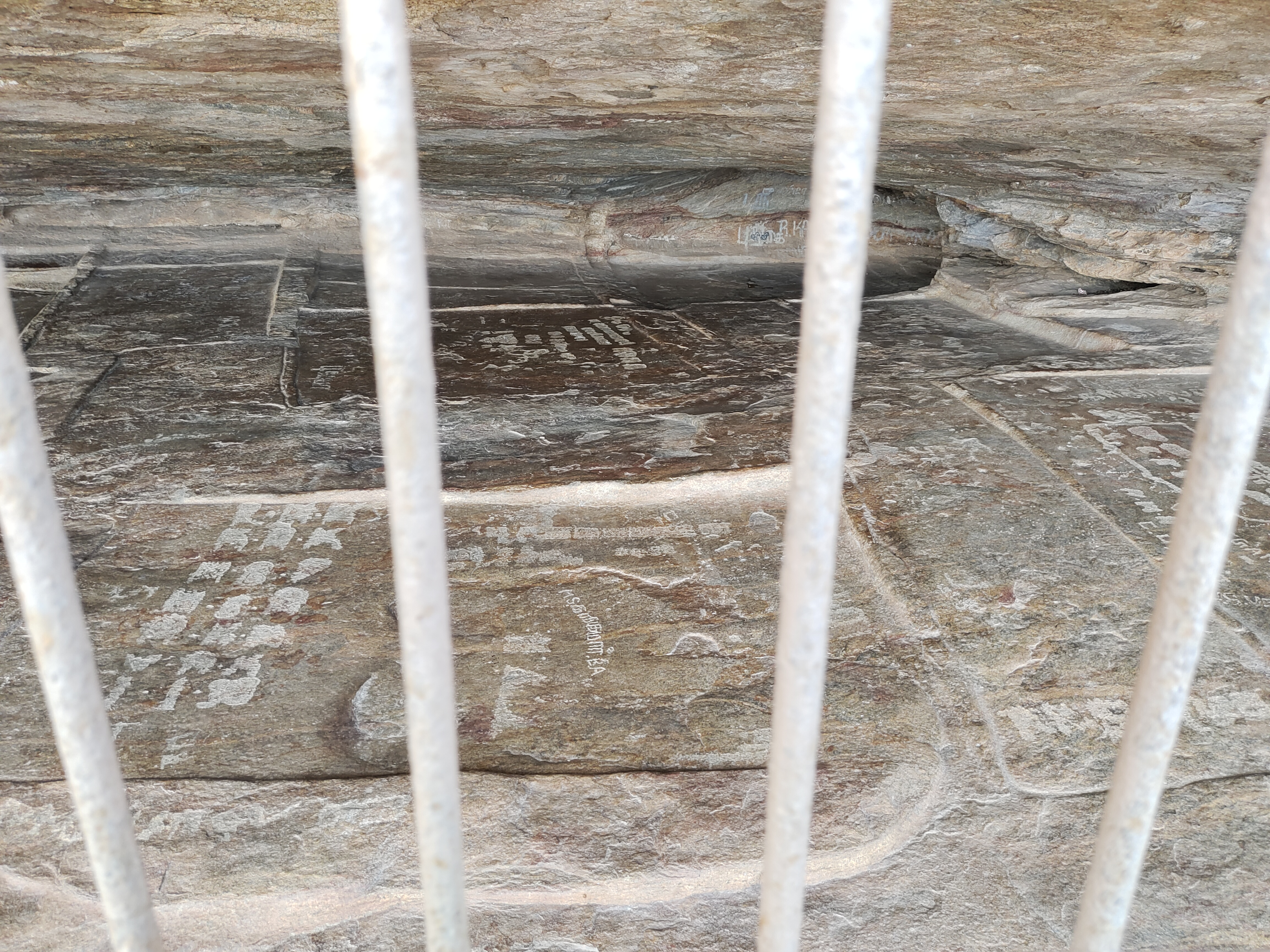
One of 17 rock beds

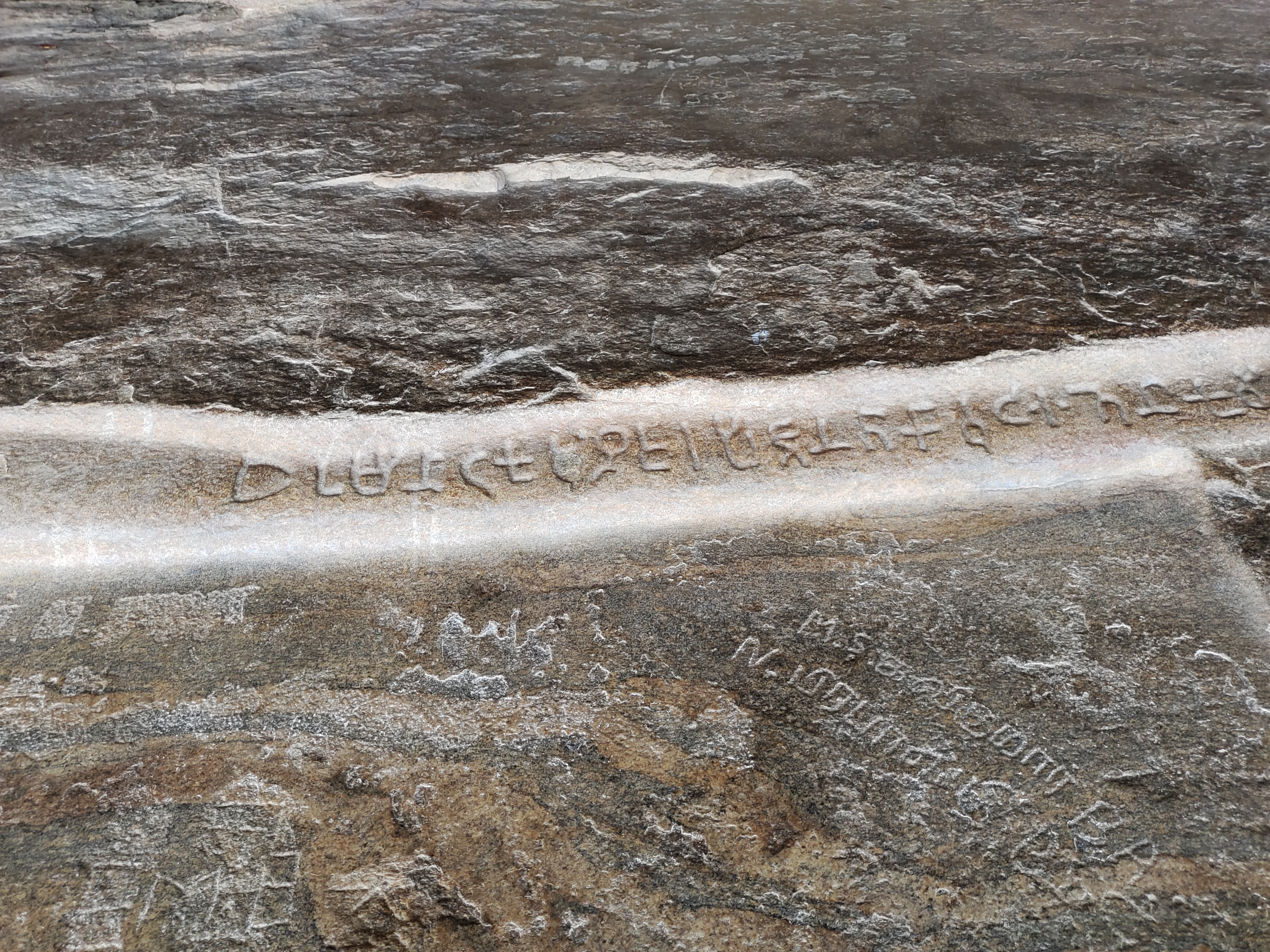
Rock Bed Inscriptions

== In popular culture ==
=== Mentions in film songs ===
Year	Film	Song		Character(s) [Actor(s)]	Singer(s) of the line	Lyricist	Composer	Director
Year	Film	Opening line (Meaning)	Allusion line (Meaning)	Character(s) [Actor(s)]	Singer(s) of the line	Lyricist	Composer	Director
1990	Unnai Solli Kutramillai	"Sorgathin vaasarpadi..." ("Heaven's Doorway...")	"Sitranna vaasalin oviyamae..." (O painting of Sittanavasal...)	Balu (Karthik)	K. J. Yesudas	Vaali	Ilaiyaraaja	Ameerjan
1999	Kadhalar Dhinam	"Enna Vilaiyazhagae..." ("What's your price, O Beauty?")	"Un pugazh vaiyamum solla Sitrana vaasalil ulla Chithiram vetkudhu mella..." ("As the world tells your fame, the painting in Sittanavasal slowly blushes...")	Raja (Kunal Singh)	Unni Menon	Vaali	A. R. Rahman	Kathir
2000	Thenali	"Alangatti Mazhai..." ("Hailstorm...")	"Sithanna vaasal sirppangal pakkam Verum paarai eno..." ("Why just a rock near the Sittanavasal sculptures...")	Dr. Kailash (Jayaram)	Srinivas	Kalaikumar	A. R. Rahman	K. S. Ravikumar
2013	Udhayam NH4	"Indrodu thadaigal ellaamae Thagaranthathu" ("From Today, All the Barriers Have Been Broken....")	"Sitranna vaasal vittu Sirpangal vanthu nindru Vattangal ittathendru Vaazhthattum ilakiyam" ("Let literature praise, that sculptures left Sittanavasal to come and circumambulate")	Prabhu (Siddharth); Rithika (Ashrita Shetty)	Srinivas; Ramya NSK	Vaali	G. V. Prakash Kumar	Manimaran

== See also ==
- Śramaṇa
- Tamil Jain
