= Valisvara Temple =

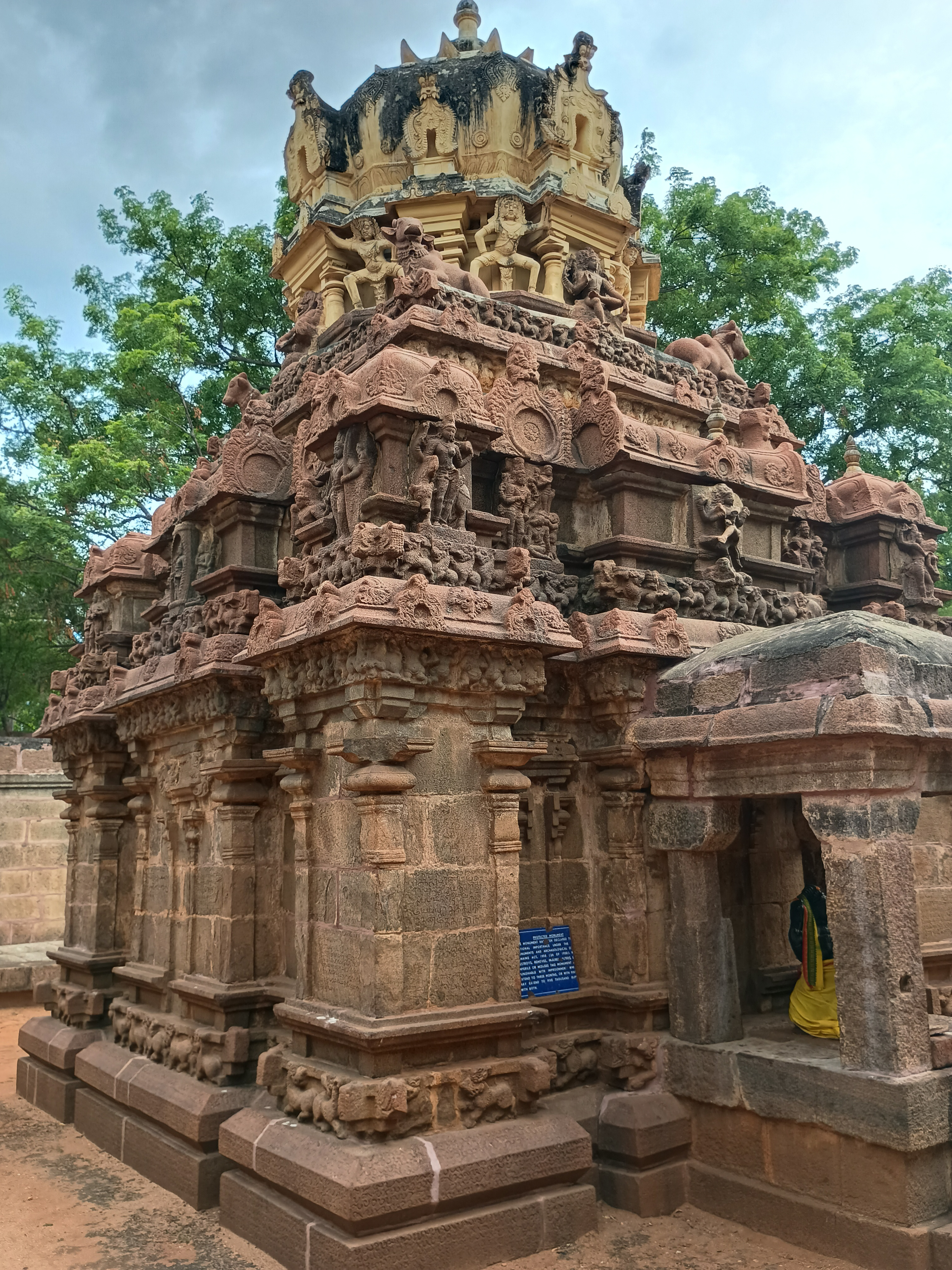

- Valisvara Temple, Thiruvaleeswaram, Tirunelveli Tamil Nadu

Religion
- Affiliation: Hinduism
- District: Tirunelveli
- Deity: Valeeswarar (Lord Shiva)

Location
- Location: Thiruvaliswaram
- State: Tamil Nadu
- Country: India
- Interactive map of Valisvara Temple
- Coordinates: 8°44′22.6″N 77°26′23.6″E

Architecture
- Elevation: 87.64 m (288 ft)

Valisvara Temple is a Hindu temple located in the town of Thiruvalisvaram in the Tirunelveli district of Tamil Nadu, South India, India. The temple is dedicated to Lord Shiva. The temple was constructed in the early part of the 10th century AD by Raja Raja Chola I the great Chola King.

== Architecture ==
The Valisvara Temple is considered to be one of the best examples of Chola architecture and is in Dravidian architecture. The main deity is Lord Shiva and he is depicted sitting in sukhasana pose. There is also an idol of Shiva as Chandesanugrahamurthi. There are also idols of Parvathi and a Shiva devotee.

The vimana has an idol of Lord Shiva in the form of Ardhanarishvara. The artistic style resembles those of Pallava temples in Panamalai and Kanchipuram. K. A. Nilakanta Sastri remarks that the "workmanship of the entire composition is unsurpassed for beauty by any other example of its kind".
