= Sittanavasal =

sittanavasal
- Village
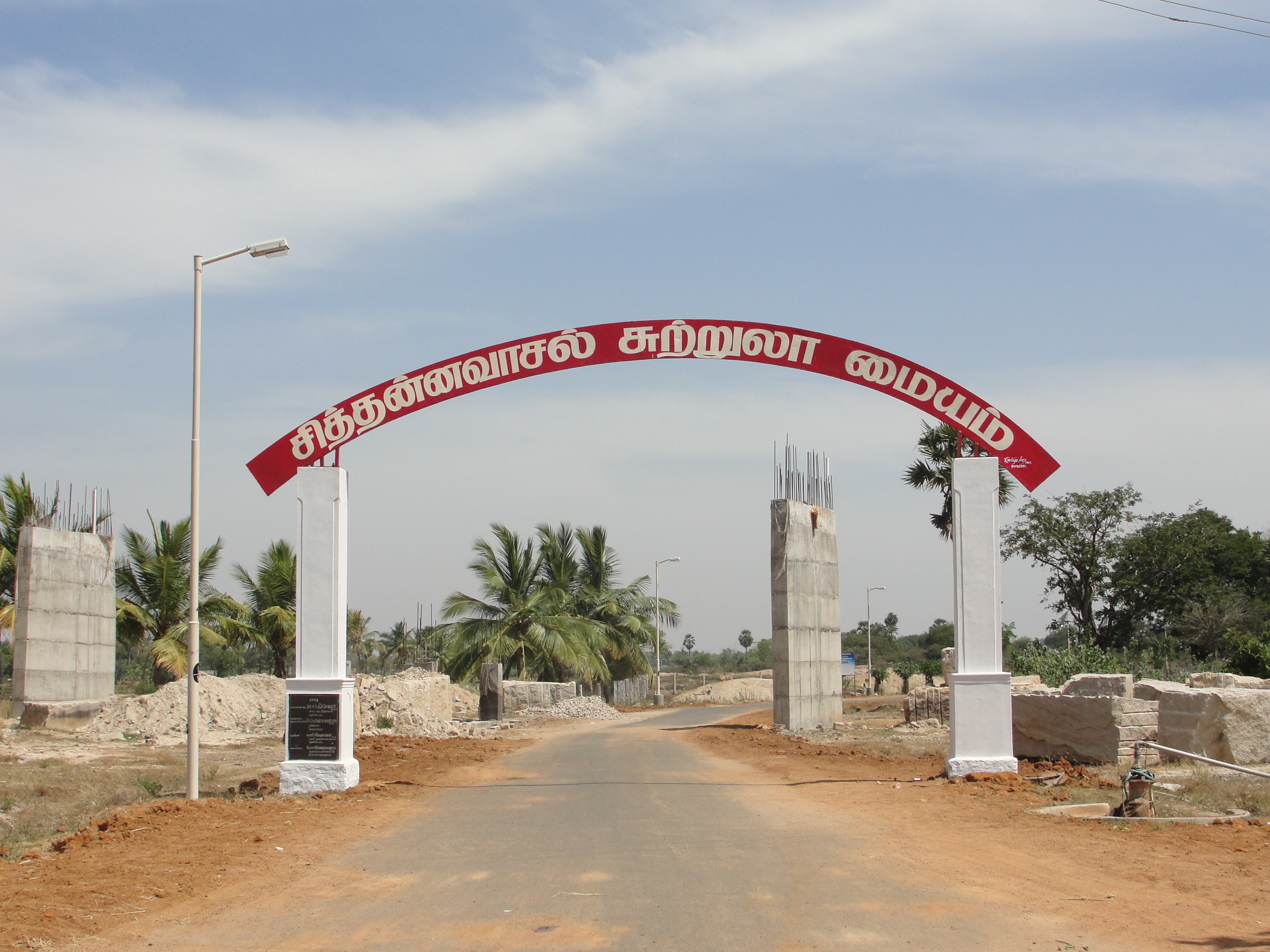
- An entrance gate to Sittanavasal

- Location in Tamil Nadu, India
- Coordinates: 10.466°N 78.734°E
- Country: India
- State: Tamil Nadu
- District: Pudukkottai

Languages
  - Official: Tamil
- Time zone: UTC+5:30 (IST)
- Telephone code: 04322
- Vehicle registration: TN 55

Sittanavasal is a small hamlet in Pudukkottai district of Tamil Nadu, India. It is known for the Sittanavasal Cave, a 2nd-century Jain cave complex. From the 7th to the 9th century A.D., the village flourished as a Jain centre.

== Etymology ==
There are several interpretations of the word Sittanvasal. In Tamil language, Sit-tan-na-va-yil means "the abode of great saints". Another explanation is that this was a suburb of Annalvayil, called chiru-annal-vaayil, meaning "smaller Annalvayil".Sittanavasal is a Tamil name that was used in the Sangam period, or that is a derivative from Siddhaanaam-vaasah, of north Indian origin which was corrupted first to "iddhannavaasah" and finally as "Sittannavasal". In the Brahmi script, the name mentioned in the inscriptions is "ChiRu-posil".

== Geography ==
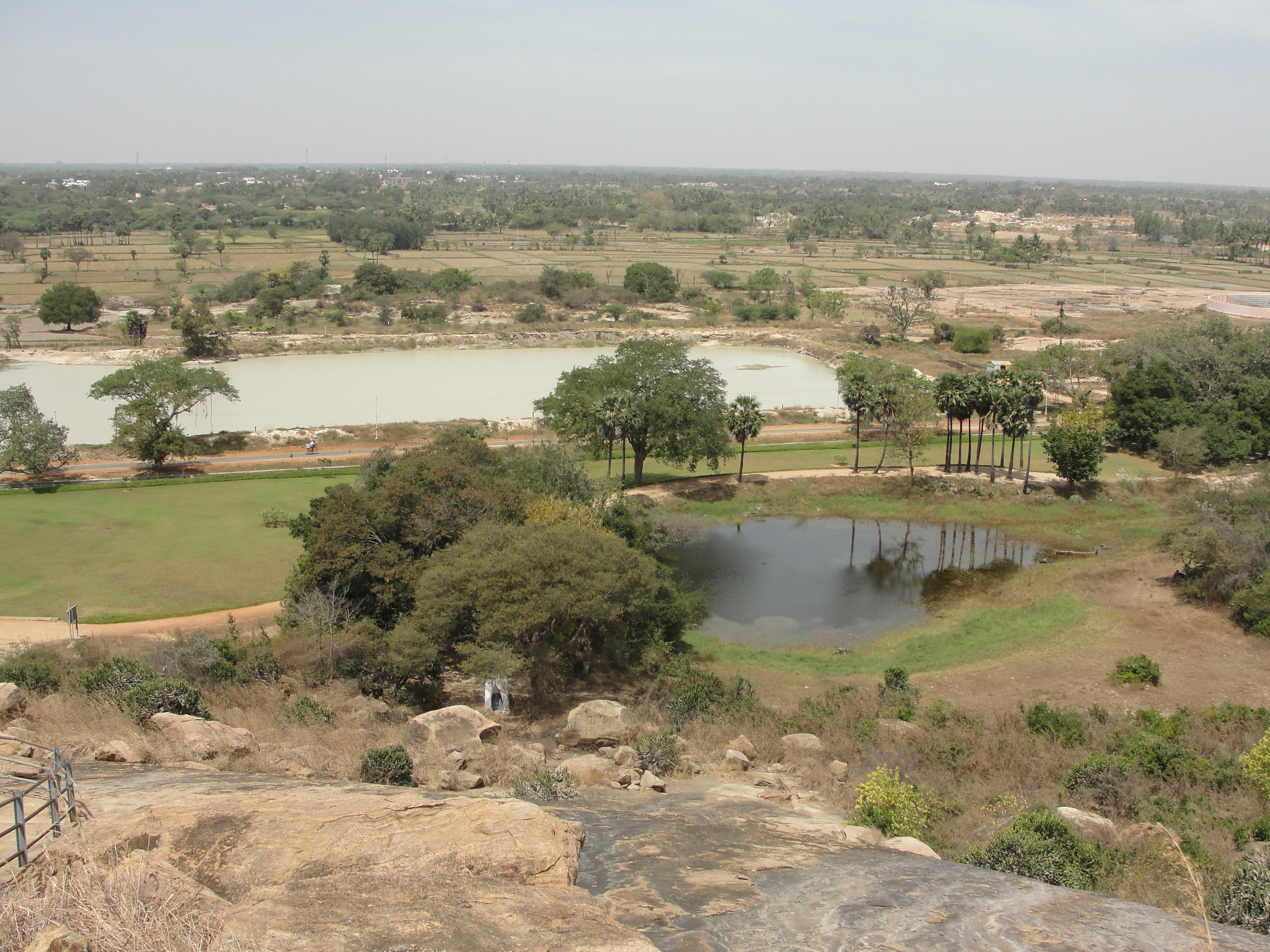
Aerial view of Sittanavasal

The Sittanavasal village is about 20 kilometres (12 mi) to the northwest of Pudukottai, just before Annavasal village and about 58 kilometres (36 mi) from Trichy. The entrance to the village has a welcome arch. Within its geographical setting there is a prominent hill of 70 metres (230 ft) height, which runs in the north–south direction, where many Jaina cave monuments are located. Megalithic sites of the 1st century BC have also been excavated near the village, on the road to the monuments. It was a flourishing village during the Jaina period from the 7th to 9th century AD. Before entering the Sittanavasal and on the road to the monuments, remains of prehistoric burial sites are seen. The Jain natural caverns, called Ezhadippattam are approached from the foothills. On the western slope of the central part of the hill is the cave temple which is approached by climbing a few 100 steps.

== History ==
The village was settled during the megalithic period from the 1st century BC according to excavations of several megalithic sites near the village. Jainism flourished here from 1st century BC to 10th century AD. The Arivarkovil or the Temple cave is initially dated to Pallava King Mahendravarman I (580-630AD) prior to his conversion from Jainism to Hinduism. The village later fell under the reign of the Pandyans in Tamil Nadu, and an inscription attributes renovation of the cave to a Pandyan king, probably Maran Sendan (654- 670AD) or Arikesari Maravarman (670-700AD). The Jain beds on the hill top indicate a Jaina era pilgrimage centre which lasted till the 9th century CE.

== Architectural monuments ==
The archaeological monuments found in the area surrounding Sittanavasal village are the architectural features of the Arivar Kovil (Sittanvasal Cave), on the western side of the hill towards the north and the painting and sculptures found within its precincts, the Jaina beds, also known as Ekadipattam or Ezhadippattam in a natural cavern on the eastern side of the hill, the Samavasarana, a place of assembly of a tirthankara in the form of mural paintings on the roof of the cave temple, megalithic burial urns, stone circles, cairns, dolmens, cists from the Iron Age called mudu-makkal-thaazhi, and a submerged tarn called the Navach-chunai to the north of the natural cavern in the hill. The Archaeological Survey of India is responsible for the maintenance of the Arivar Kovil and the Jaina beds.

=== Sittanavasal Cave ===
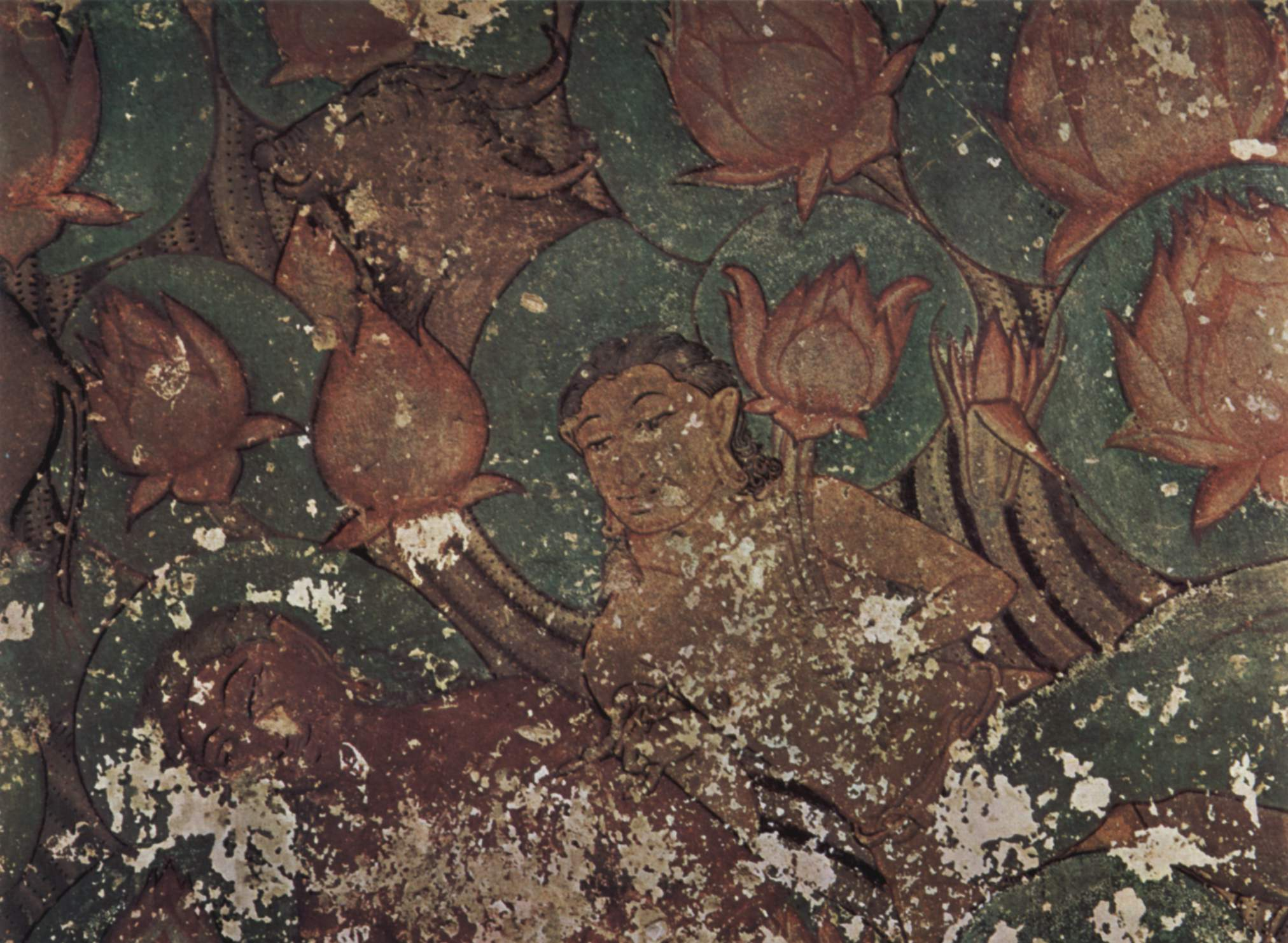
A fresco-secco painting

The Sittanavasal Cave, also known as Arivar Kovil, is a Jain monastery of the 7th century, small in size, excavated in a bluff on the western slope of the hill in its centre. It is noted for its paintings which have been painted in fresco-secco technique with many mineral colours. The painting themes depict a beautiful lotus pond and flowers, people collecting lotuses from the pond, two dancing figures, lilies, fish, geese, buffaloes and elephants. Mulk Raj Anand said of the paintings, "Pallava craftsmen used greens and browns and puqiles, with a genuine ability and a lyrical flow of line. Lotuses spring up from imaginary ponds amid variegated greenery, under a bluish sheen." In addition, inscriptions of the 9th and 10th century are also seen. The exquisite ceiling of the Ardhamandapam is decorated with murals from the 7th century. The cave temple has placid pillars and sculptures of Jain Tirthankaras. However, most of the frescoes which were covered fully in plaster have been severely defaced or not clearly visible due to inadequate security and maintenance resulting in vandalism in the past five or six decades. Originally, the entire cave temple, including the sculptures, was covered with plaster and painted. The paintings are on the theme of Jaina Samavasarana, the "most attractive heavenly pavilion", referring to the attainment of Nirvana and Khatika bhumi.

=== Ezhadippattam ===
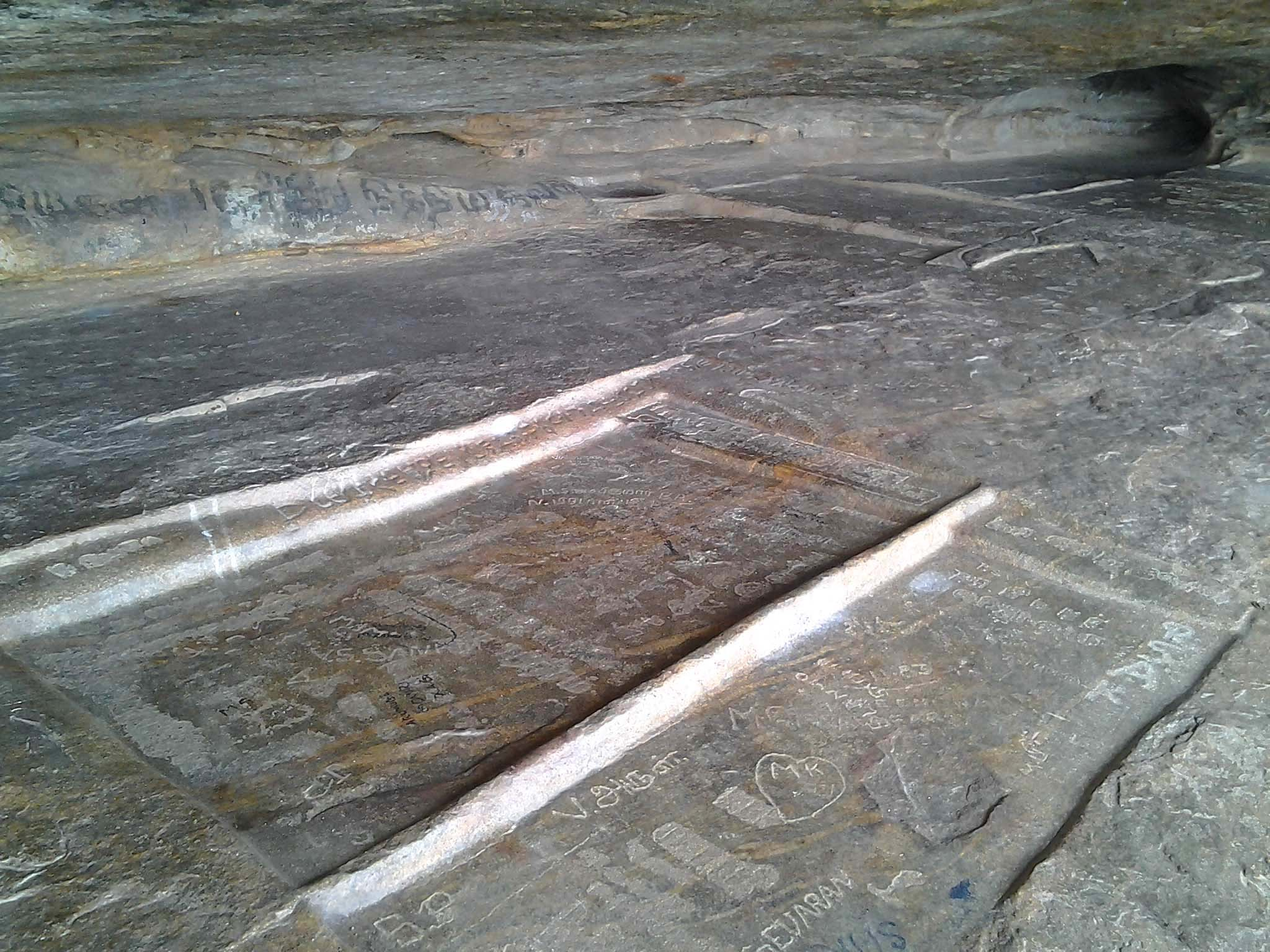
Stone beds or Ezhadippattam with inscriptions of Jain saints

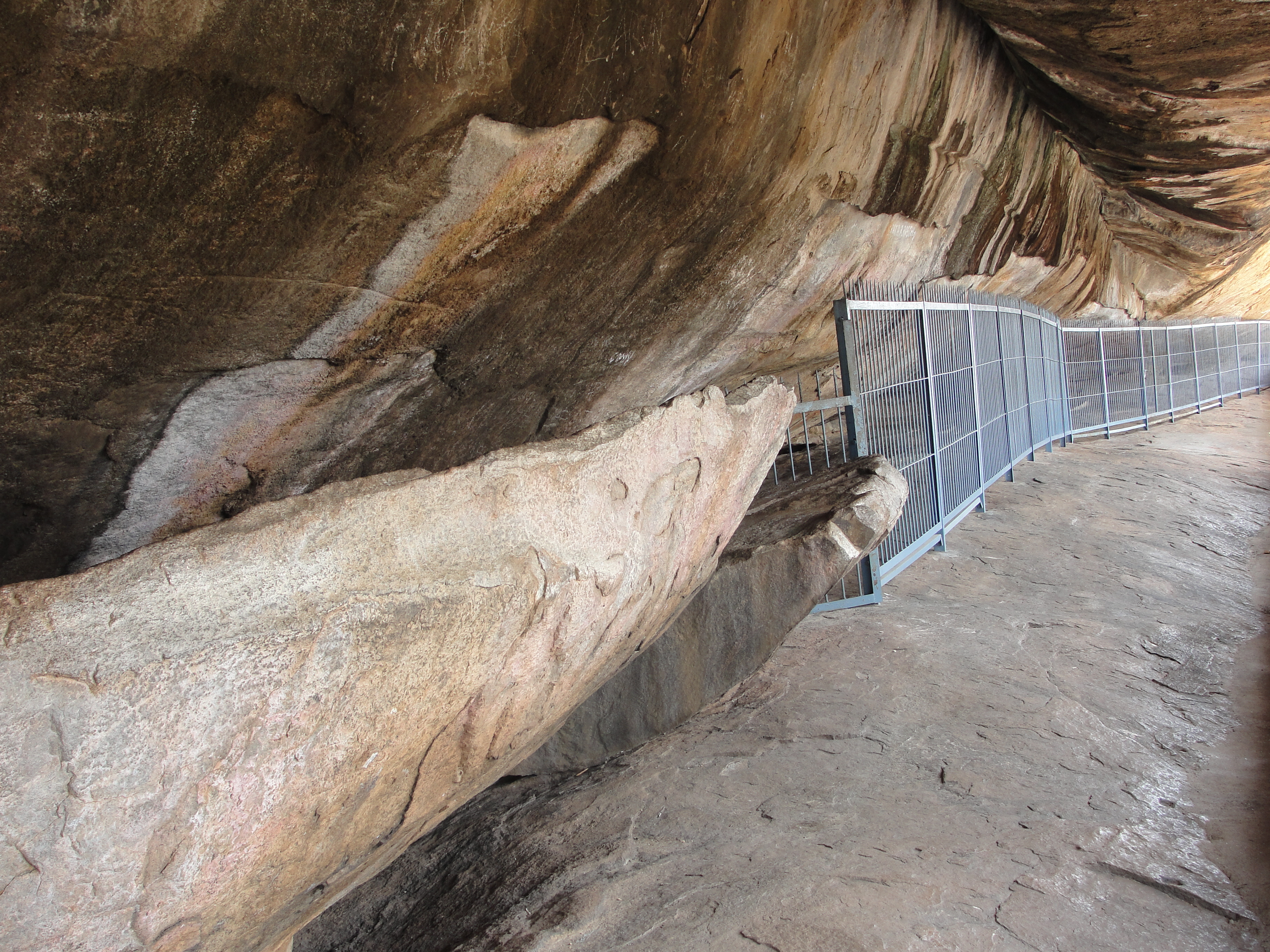
Walk way along rocky cliff with guard rails to the Jaina Beds or Ekadippatham

Ezhadippattam or Jaina beds is a natural cave, marked by a horizontal floor space which is laid out with well-polished rock beds that were used by Jaina ascetics. There are seventeen beds at the top marked on the floor. These carved beds have headrests cut in them in the form of a raised pillow. The oldest Tamil Brahmi inscriptions seen inscribed on the beds are dated to the 3rd century BC, although recent research by Iravatham Mahadevan dates it to the First Century BC and extending to the 10th Century AD. On one of the oldest and largest beds, the inscription in Tamil is of Tamil Brahmi script of the 1st century BC, considered as the oldest lithic record of South India. Also, names of ascetics who engaged in sallekhana (fasting unto death) are written on their respective beds.

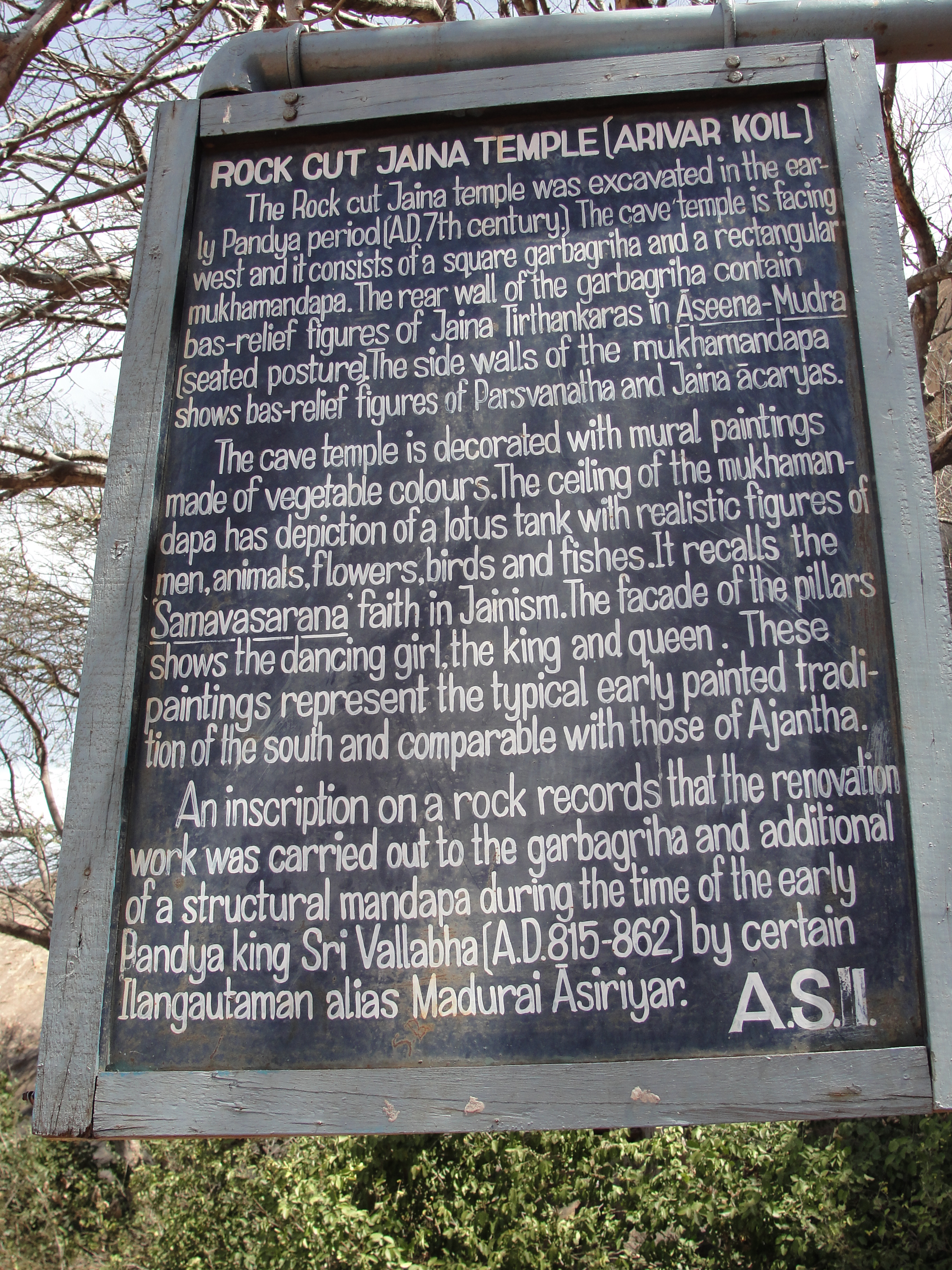
A plaque at the entrance to the monuments in Sittanvasil

=== Jambunatha Cave ===
Jambunatha Cave or Navach-chunai, in the style of late Pandya temples of the 13th century AD, is a tarn located between Ezadippattam and Arivar Kovil caves. It is on the eastern slope on the central part of the hills. This is a small rock-cut temple which is submerged in a small lake (tarn). Hill climbing is required to reach the cave temple. An old jambu tree (Syzygium jambolanum) is seen near the lake, which gives its name to the cave. It is a Shiva temple with a lingam in the centre, which is worshiped by baling out water from the lake.

== Megalithic sites ==
Excavations carried out in 1934–35 in the Sittanvasal village have revealed many Megalithic burial sites near the hill, which are in the form of both cist and urn burials. These are located on both sides of the road leading from the monuments to the main road, after about 100 metres (330 ft) from the Ezhadippattam; more are seen on the left side of the road leading to Pudukkottai. Antiquaries collected from the sites also include specimens of garnet, red jasper and rock crystal at the foot of the hill have been picked up near the foot of the hill, pottery pieces with coating of molten and coloured glass inside, and also small pieces of coloured glass; all these are indicative of glass manufacturing in the area.

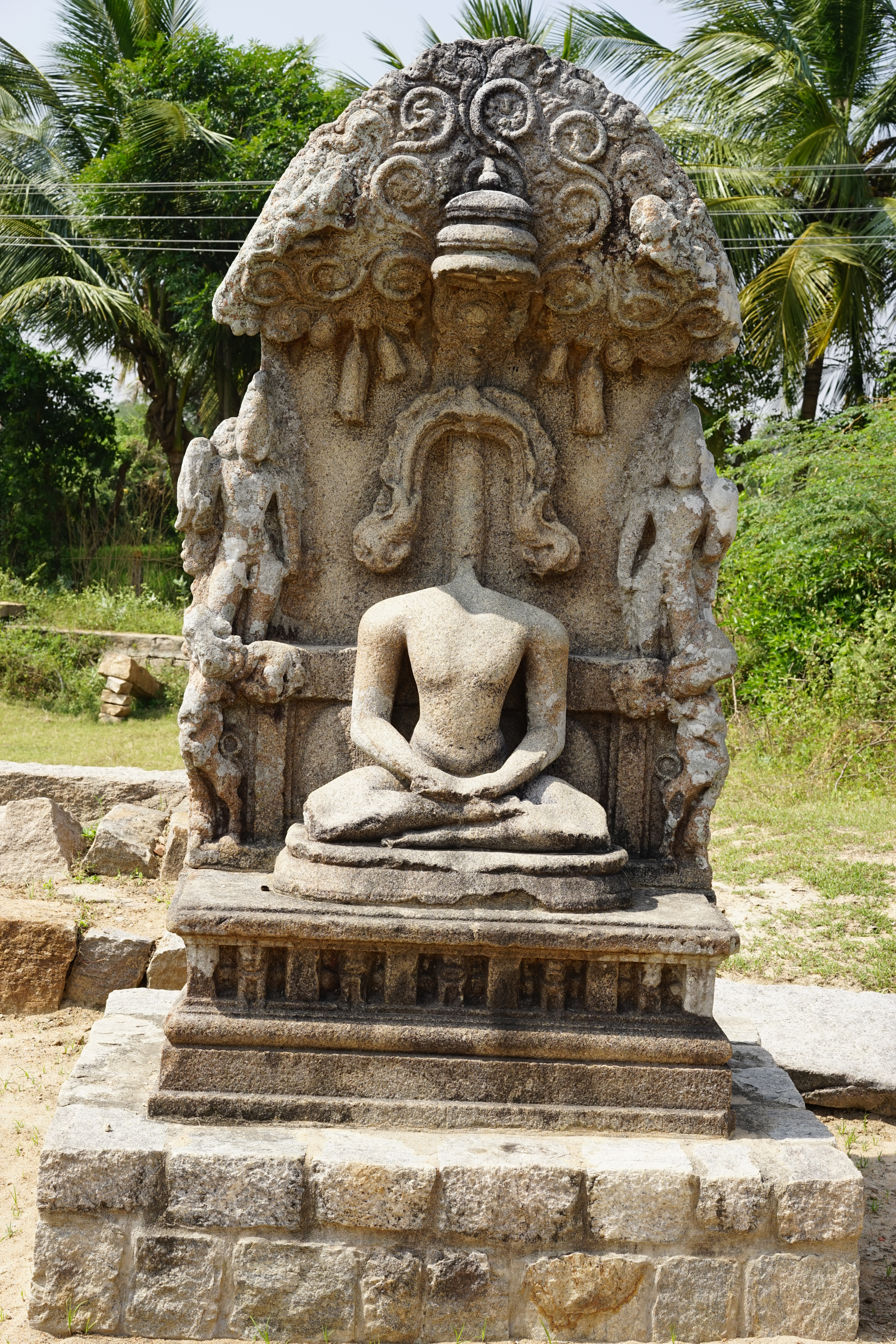
Jain Sculpture close to Sittanavasal, India
