= Thalagireeshwarar Temple =

Talagirisvara Temple is a Hindu temple located in the village of Panamalai in the Viluppuram district of Tamil Nadu, India.

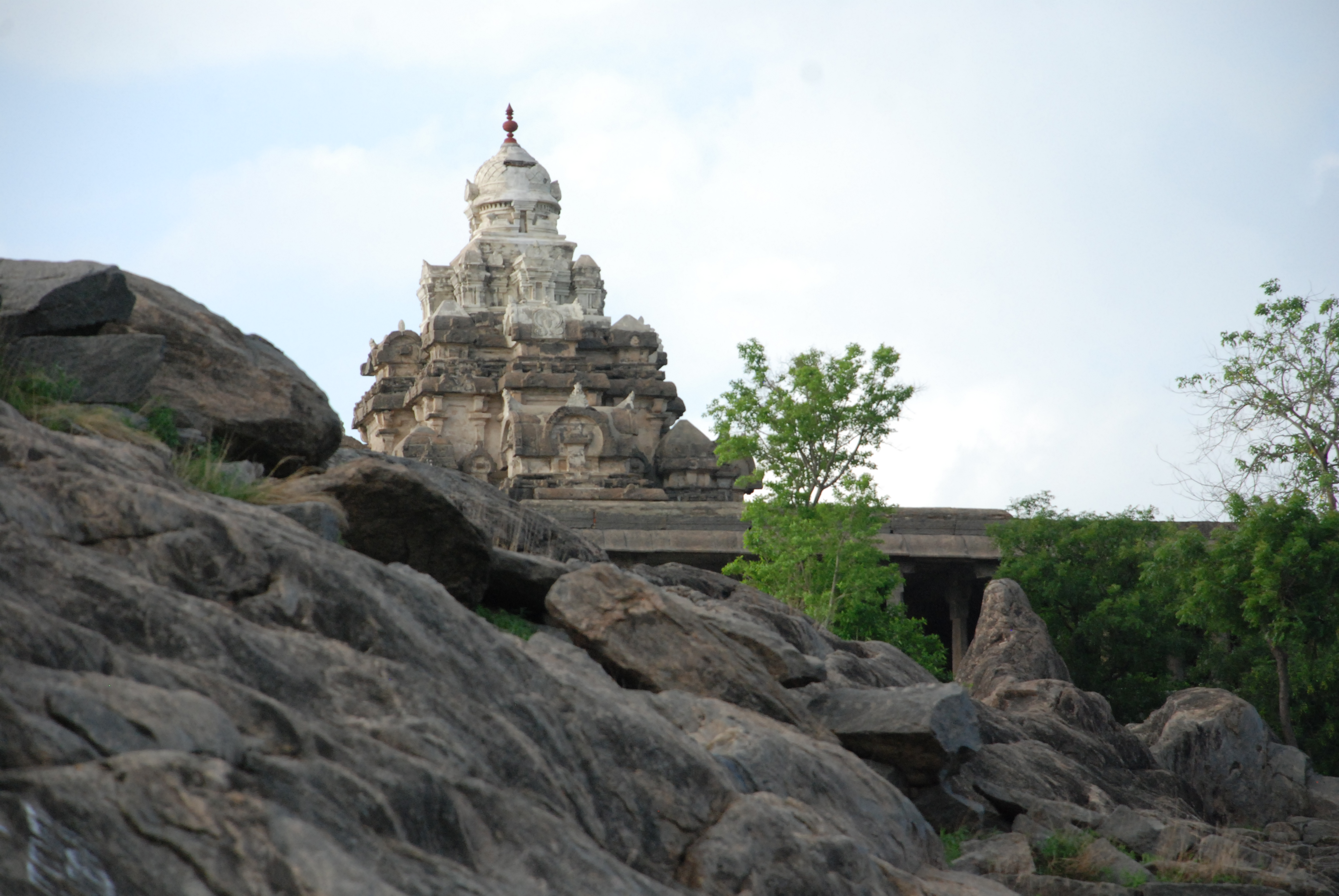

== History ==
Narasimhavarman II, also known as Rajasimha, is credited with constructing structural temples of Pallava dynasty namely the Shore Temple at Mamallapuram, Kailasanathar Temple and Talagirisvara temple at Panamalai. The temple is built on a small hillock overlooking the Panamalai lake. This 7th Century structure has a Vimana which resembles that of Kailasanatha temple of Kanchipuram. The garbhagriha houses a Dharalingam and as in Pallava temples of that time, there is a Somaskanda panel on rear wall of the sanctum. There is an Ardhamandapam (half Mandapam). On the walls of the Ardhamandapam one can see panels of deities such as Brahma with Saraswati and Vishnu with Lakshmi on either side. The shrine faces east and the garbhagriha is surrounded on all the three sides by sub-shrines (Anga Kovil or Limb Shrines - which are attached to the main shrine). A few more sub-shrines and a Mahamandapam (a big Mandapam) have been added to the structure at much later period. The Vimana is three tiered and the top tier has been reconstructed. The pillars with squatting lions, a typical Pallava signature can also be found.

The sub-shrine to the north, has a small section of mural painting which has survived over the years, bears testimony to the Pallavas mastery of the art.

== Speciality ==
The painting of Shiva as "Nataraja" on the walls of the cave is the earliest Nataraja representation of Shiva.
