= Panamalai =

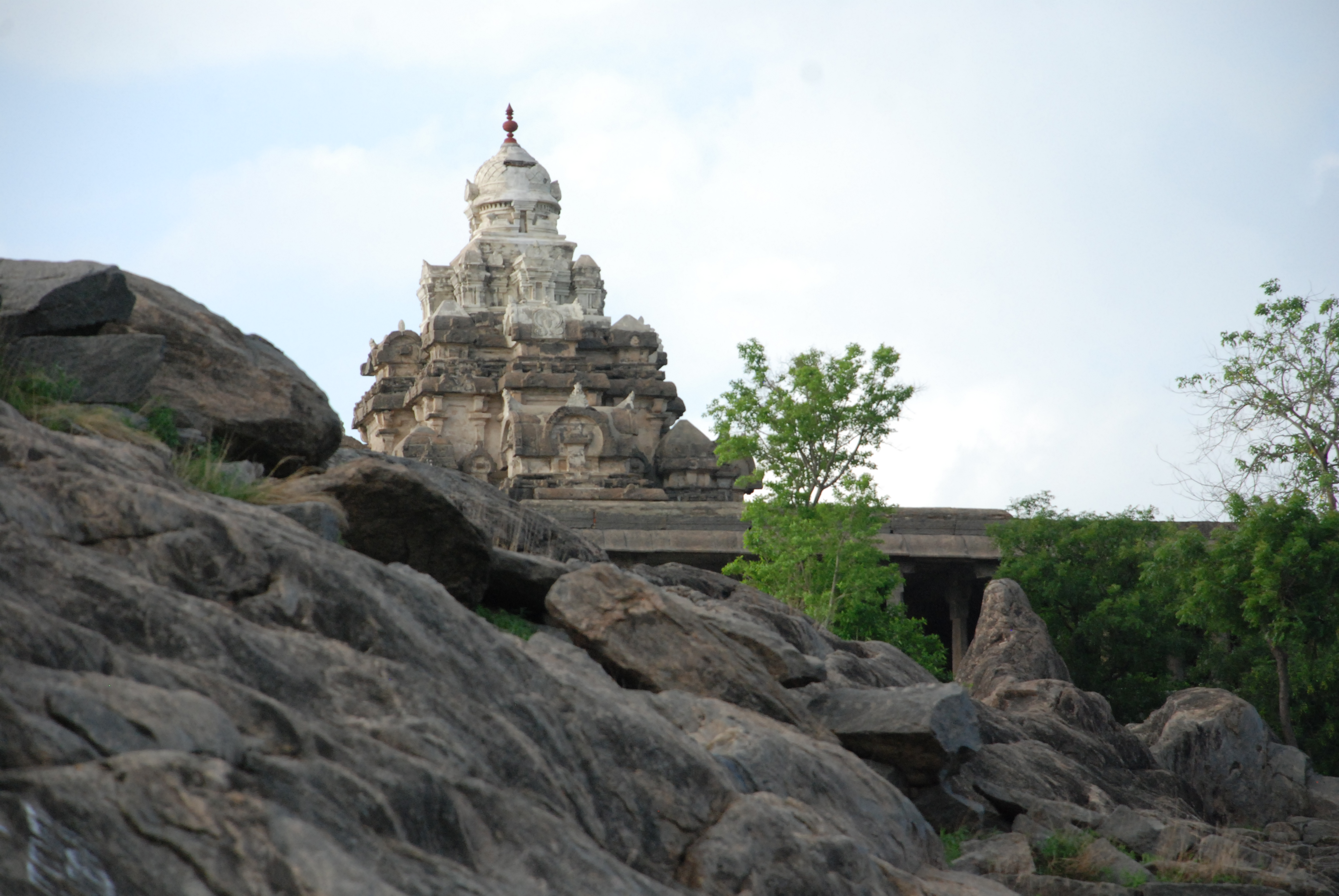
Panamali temple view

Panamalai lies 23 kilometers from Gingee, Viluppuram district in Tamil Nadu, India. The site is known as a location to various ancient structural temples built during the Pallava dynasty. One of them is the Talagirisvara Temple.

== Talagirisvara Temple ==
Narasimhavarman II, also known as Rajasimha or Rajamalla, is credited with constructing structural temples of Pallava dynasty namely the Shore Temple at Mamallapuram, Kailsanatha Temple and Talagirisvara temple at Panamalai. The temple is built on a small hillock overlooking the Panamalai lake. This 7th Century structure has a Vimana which resembles that of Kailasanatha temple of Kanchipuram.

The garbhagriha houses a Dharalingam and as in Pallava temples of that time, there is a Somaskanda panel on rear wall of the sanctum. There is an Ardhamandapam (half Mandapam). On the walls of the Ardhamandapam one can see panels of deities such as Brahma with Saraswati and Vishnu with Lakshmi on either side. The shrine faces east and the garbhagriha is surrounded on all the three sides by sub-shrines (Anga Kovil or Limb Shrines – which are attached to the main shrine). A few more sub-shrines and a Mahamandapam (a big Mandapam) have been added to the structure at much later period. The Vimana is three tiered and the top tier has been reconstructed. The pillars with squatting lions, a typical Pallava signature can also be found.

The sub-shrine to the north, has a small section of mural painting which has survived over the years, bearing testimony to the Pallavas' mastery of the art.

== Gallery ==
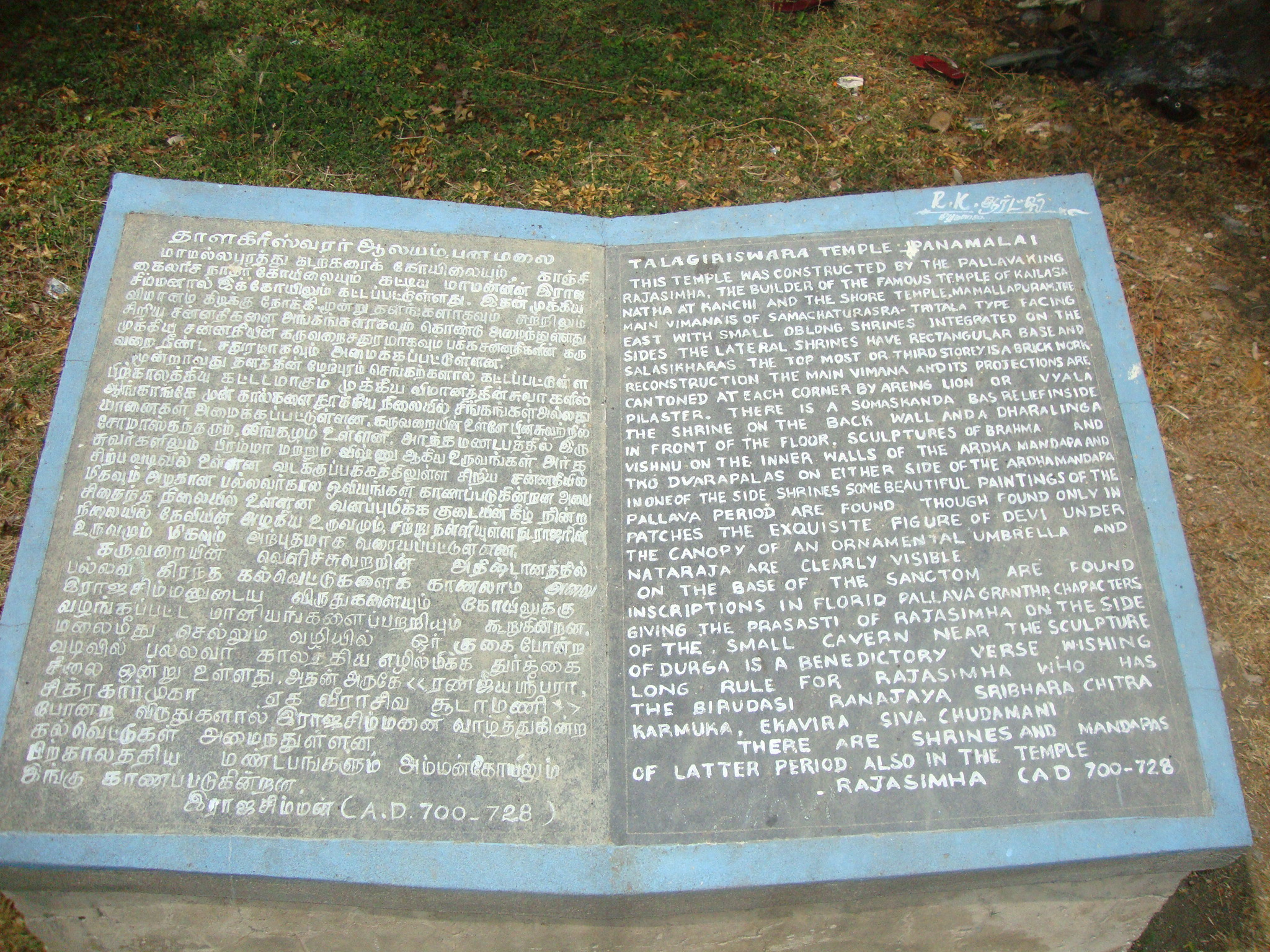
Panamalai temple stone carving explaining its history bilingually in English and Tamil

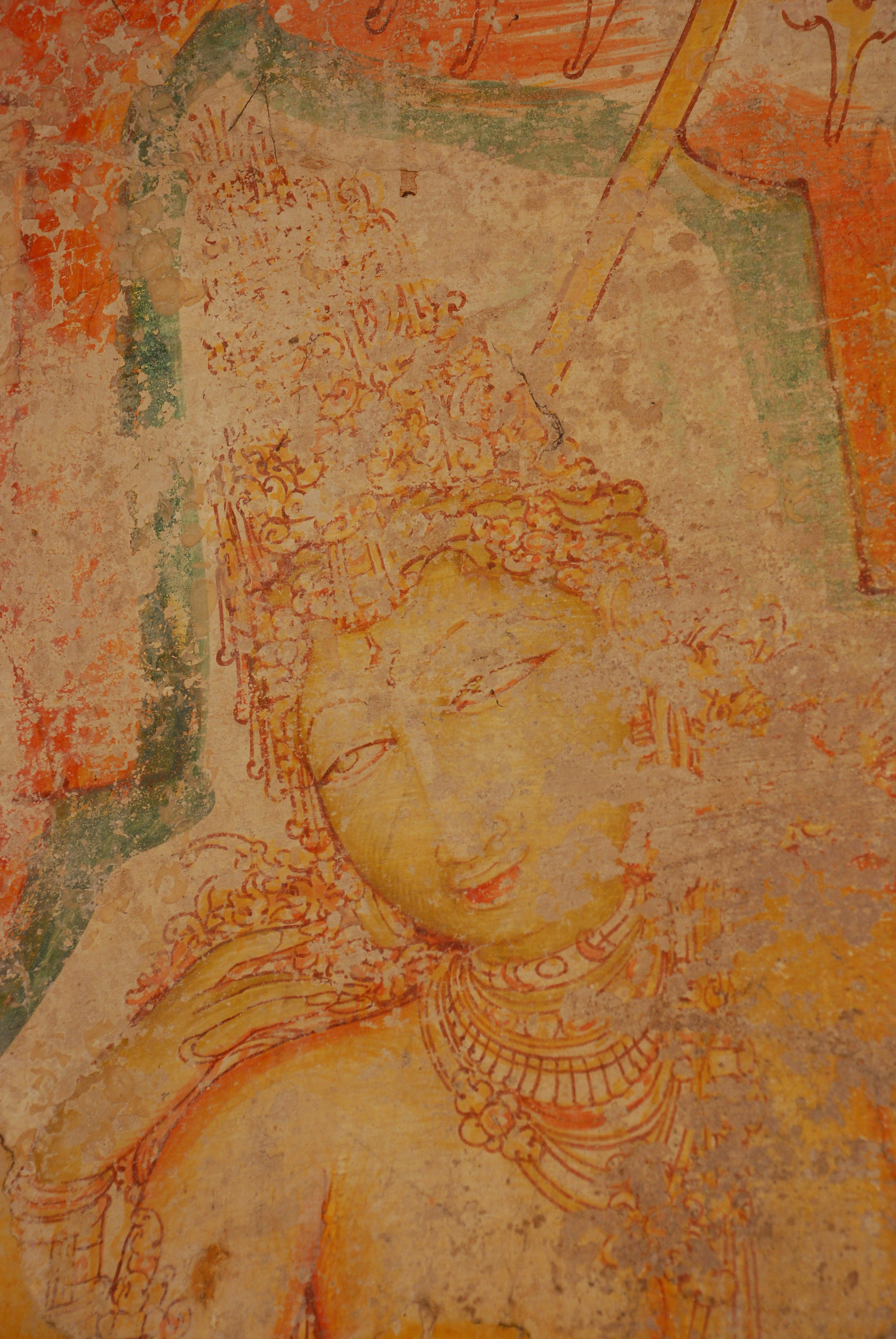
The residual portion of the mural found in Panamalai, bears testimony to the Pallava's mastery of painting

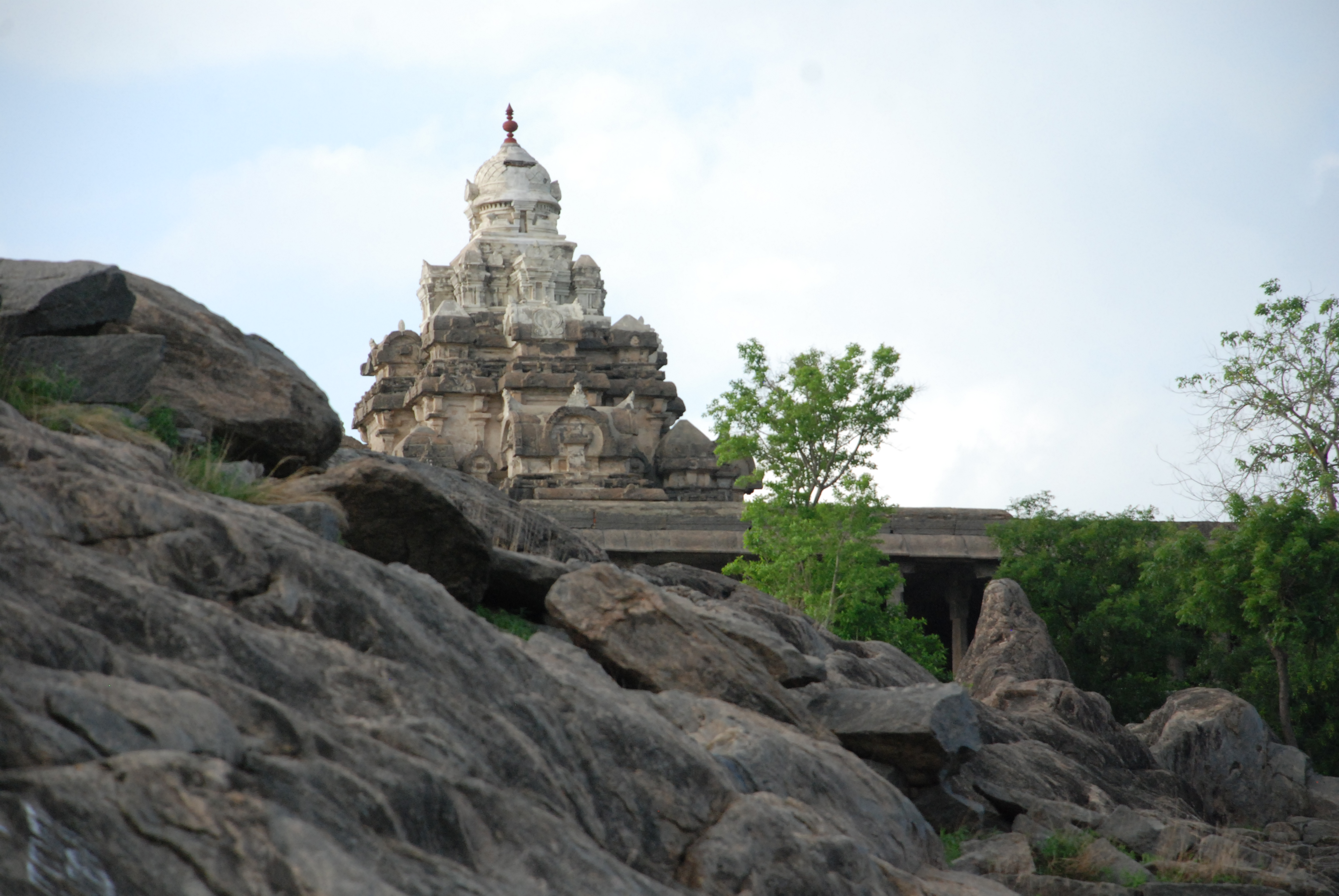
View of the temple as you approach it climbing the hillock Dear Panamalai. Panamalai is a village located in the Villupuram district of Tamil Nadu state.

== Latitude and Longitude ==
Latitude 12.1010300 N Longitude 79.3823500 E
