= Samavasarana =

Divine preaching hall of the Tirthankara in Jainism

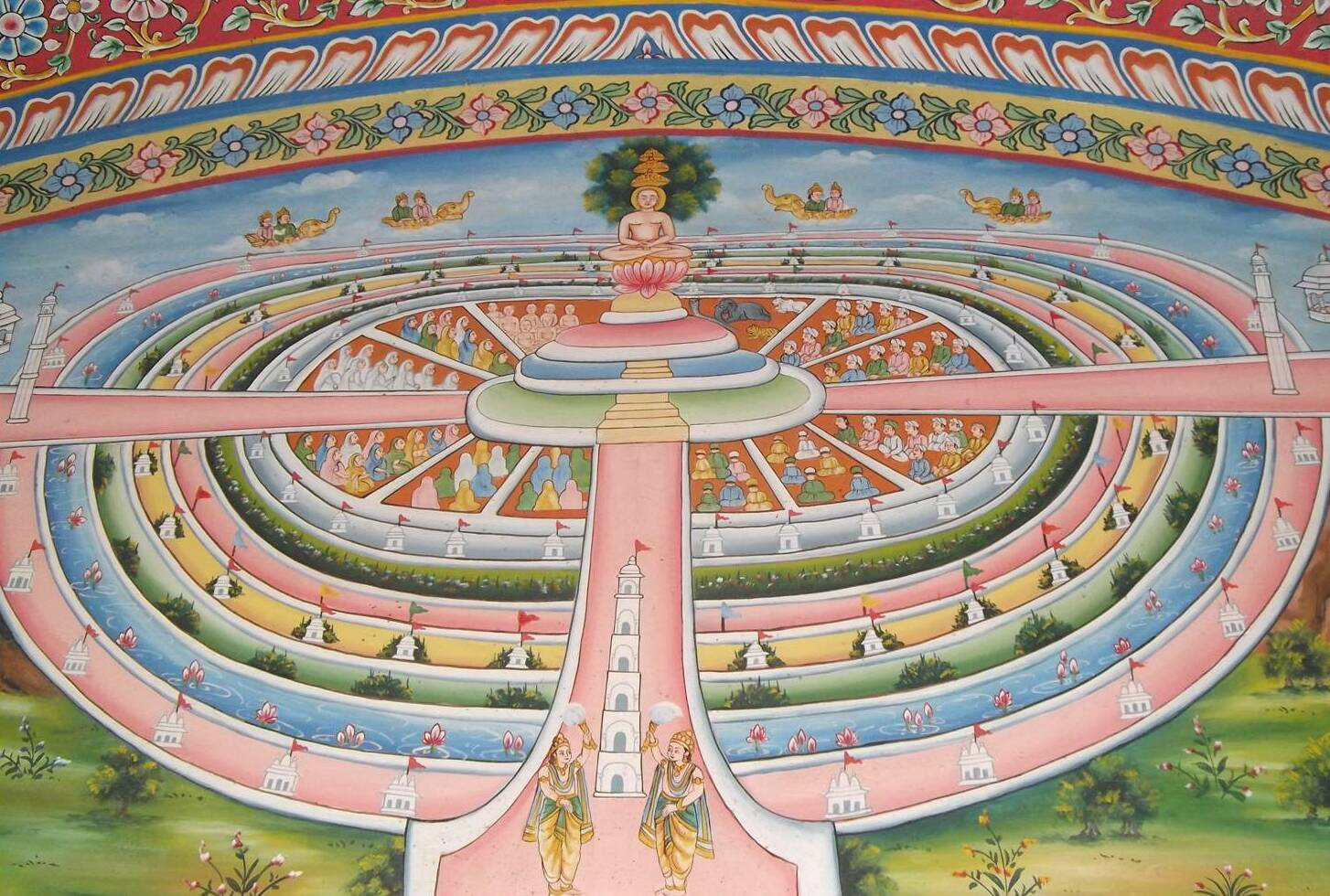
Samavasarana of Tirthankara

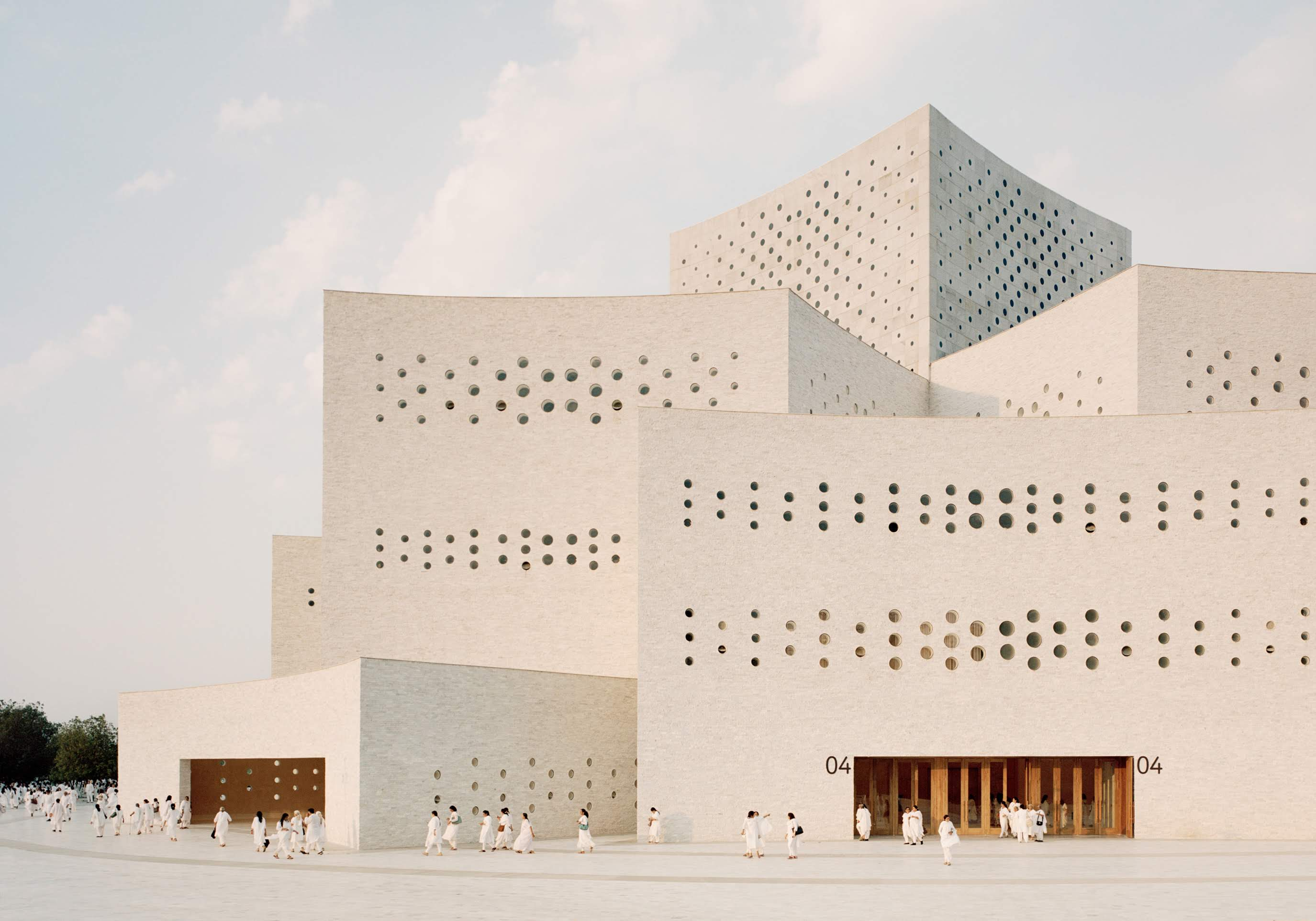
Raj Sabhagruh, Spiritual and convention complex at Shrimad Rajchandra Ashram Dharampur whose architecture is inspired by Samovasaran.

In Jainism, Samavasarana or Samosharana ("Refuge to All") is the divine preaching hall of the Tirthankara, stated to have more than 20,000 stairs in it. The word samavasarana is derived from two words, sama, meaning general and avasara, meaning opportunity. It is an important feature in Jain art. The Samavasarana seems to have replaced the original Jain stupa as an object of worship.

== Samavasarana ==
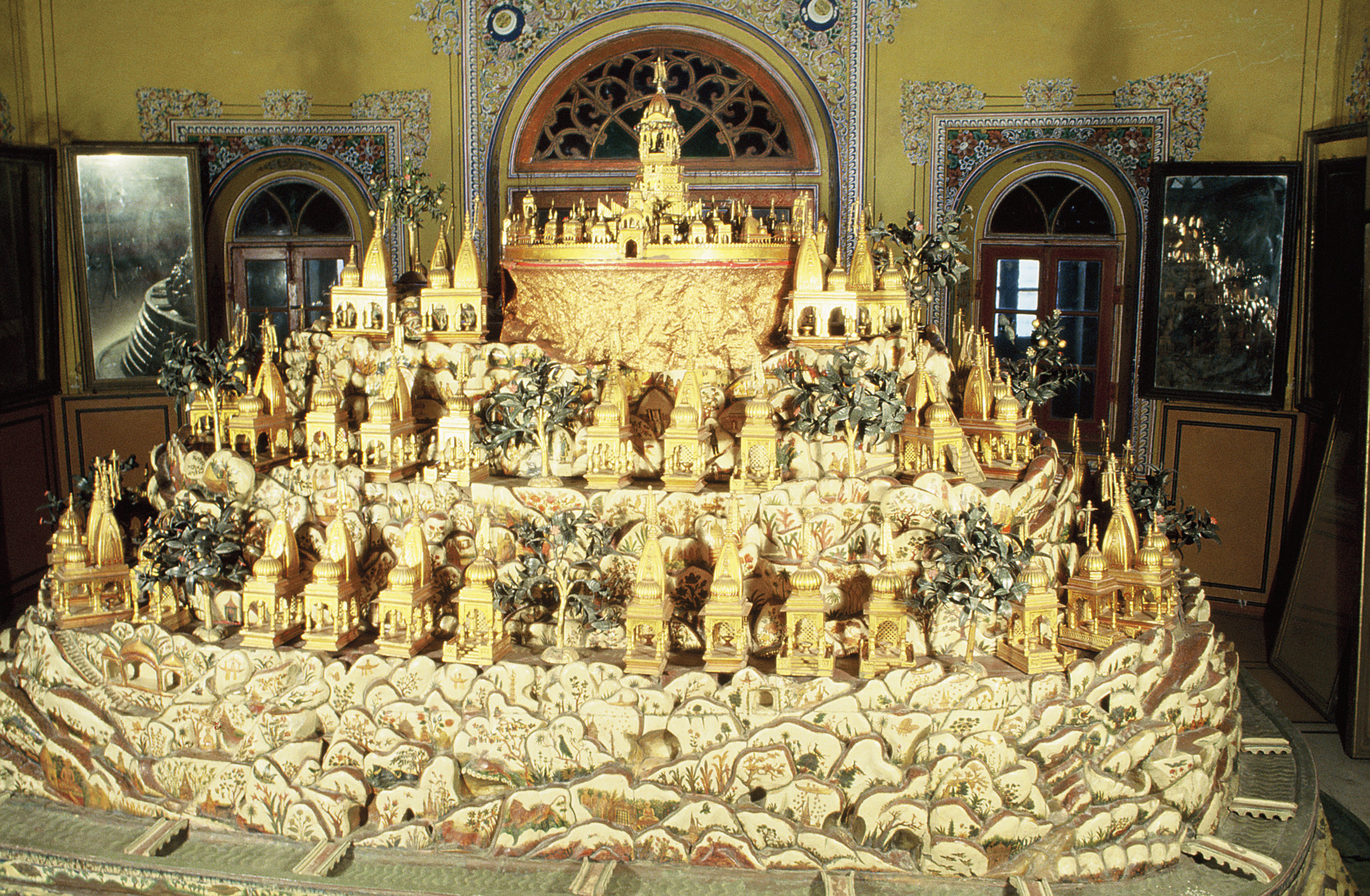
Samosharana of Tirthankara Rishabha (Ajmer Jain temple)

In samavasarana, the tirthankara sits on a throne without touching it (about two inches above it). Around the tirthankara sit the ganadharas (chief disciples). Living beings sit in the following order:

- In the first hall, ascetics
- In the second hall, one class of deva ladies
- In the third hall, aryikas (nuns) and laywomen
- In the next three halls, three other classes of deva ladies
- In the next four halls, the four classes of devas (heavenly beings)
- Men, in the eleventh hall
- Animals, in the last hall

According to Jain texts, there would be four wide roads with four huge columns, Manasthamba (literally, pride pillar), one in each side. The total size of the hall varies depending upon the height of the people in that era. The size of Rishabhadeva's samavasarana was 12 km^{2} (4.6 sq mi).

== Effects ==
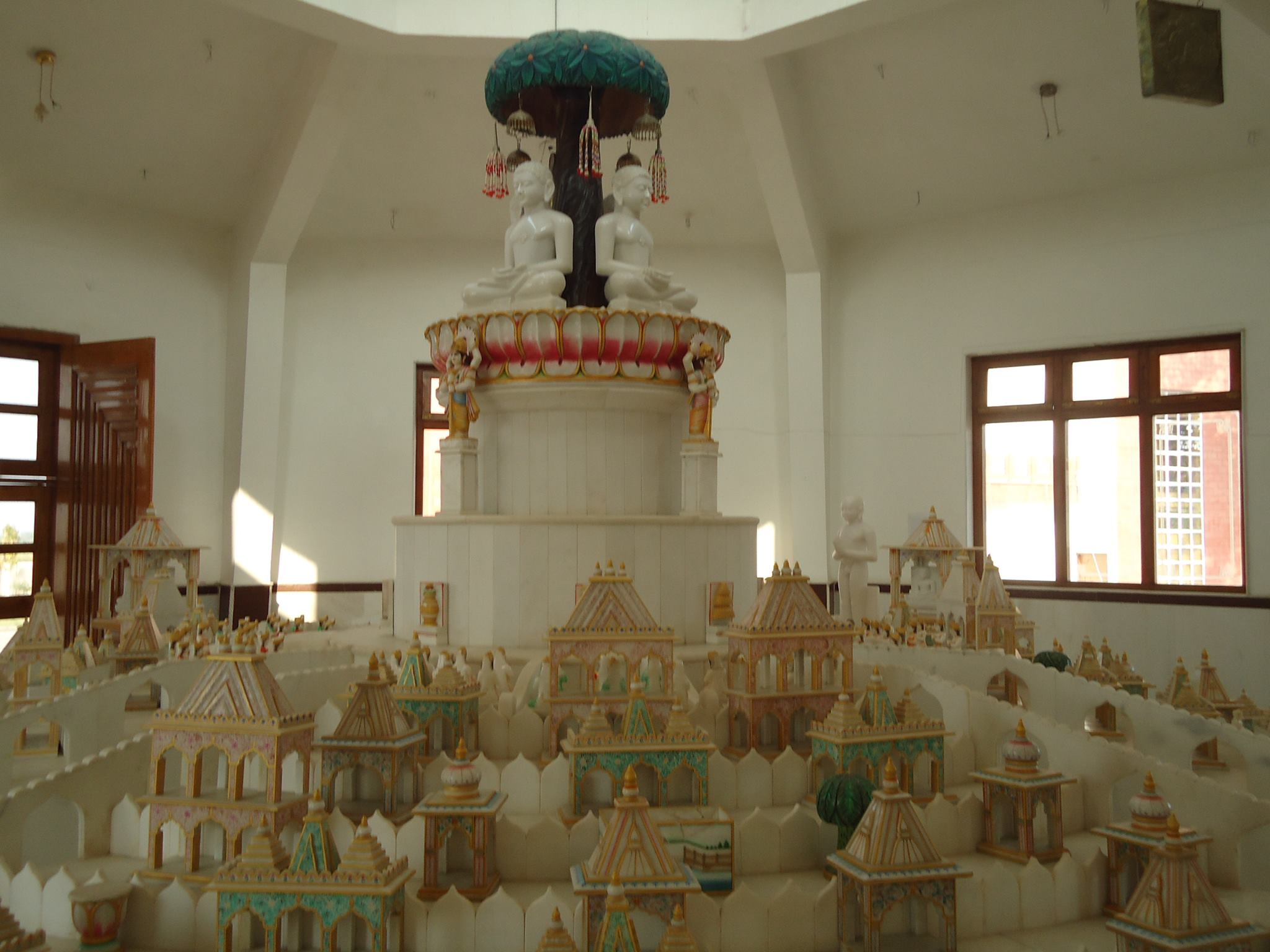
Samavasarana

In samavasarana, a tirthankara sits facing the east, but appears to be looking in all directions. Tirthankara sits on a soft cushion while preaching the Jain philosophy in plain terms. All humans and animals can understand the discourse. Jain scriptures say that all creatures who listen would become less violent and less greedy. The speech of the tirthankara is distinctly heard by every one present.

== Gallery ==
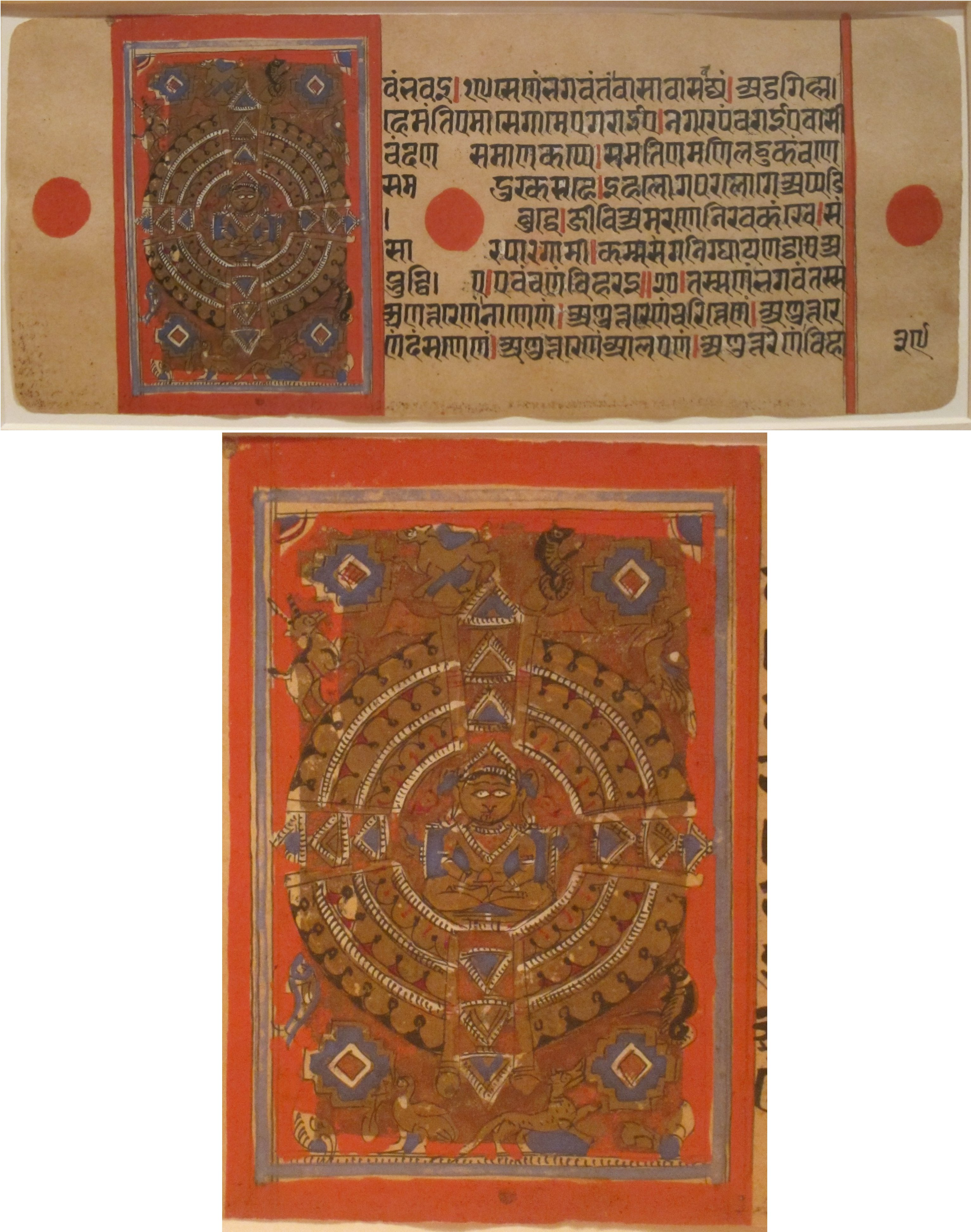
Jain manuscript page with Mahavira teaching to all creatures in Samavasarana, western India, c. 1500–1600, gouache on paper

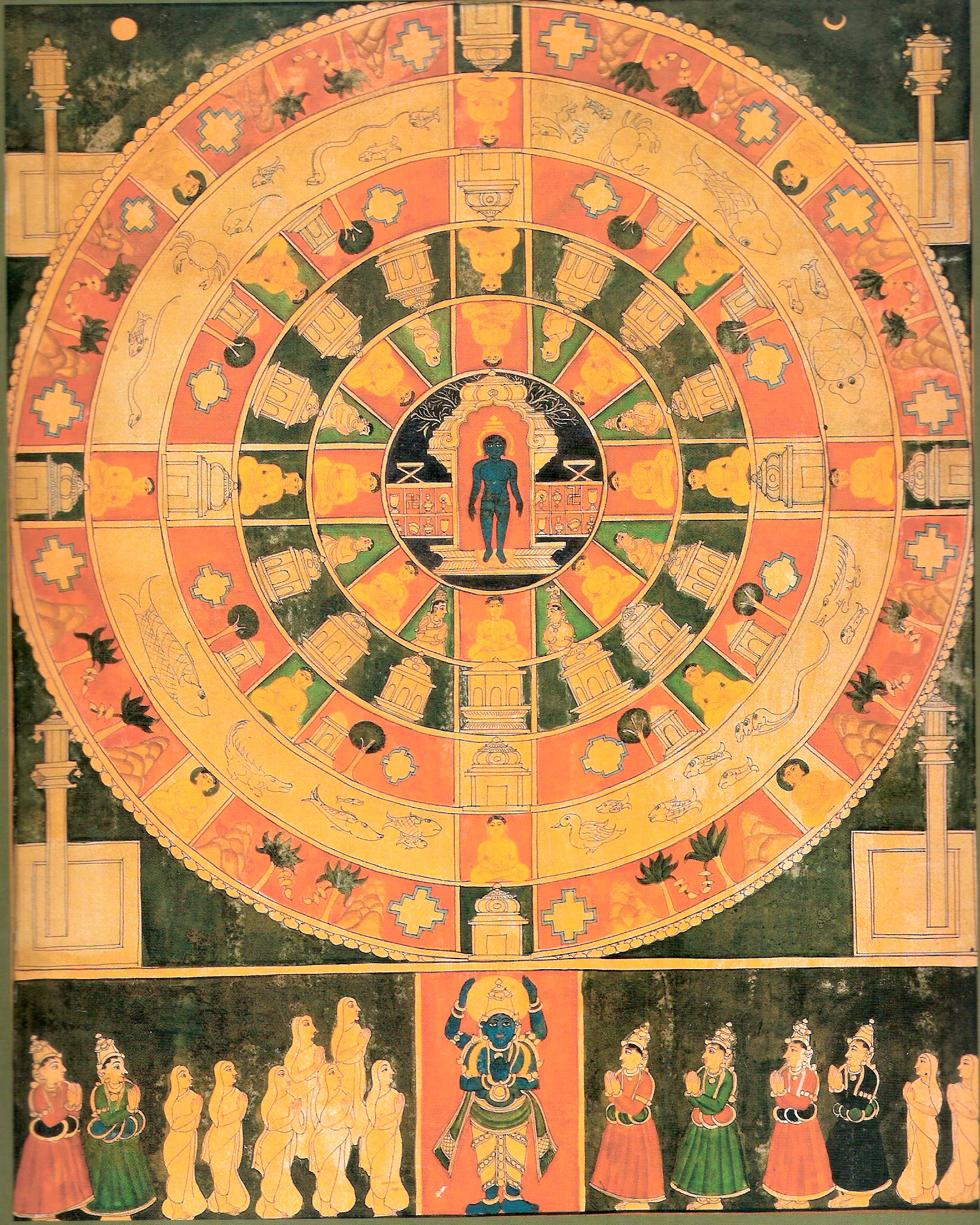
Samavasarana of Mahavira as depicted in 19th-century art from Mysore.

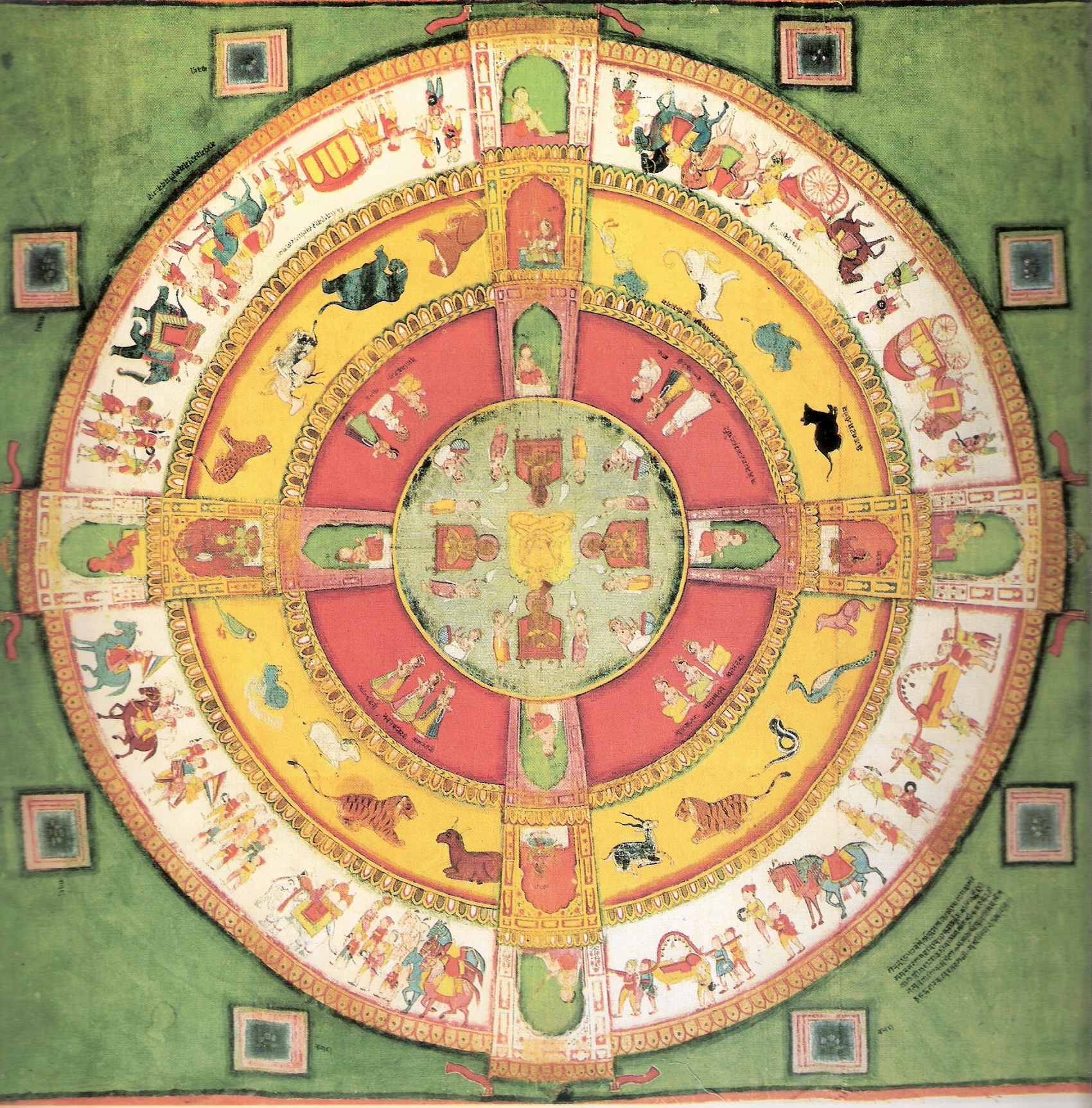
Painting of Samavasarana (Assembly hall) of a Jain Tirthankara. It depicts various beings who come to hear the preachings of the Jina peacefully

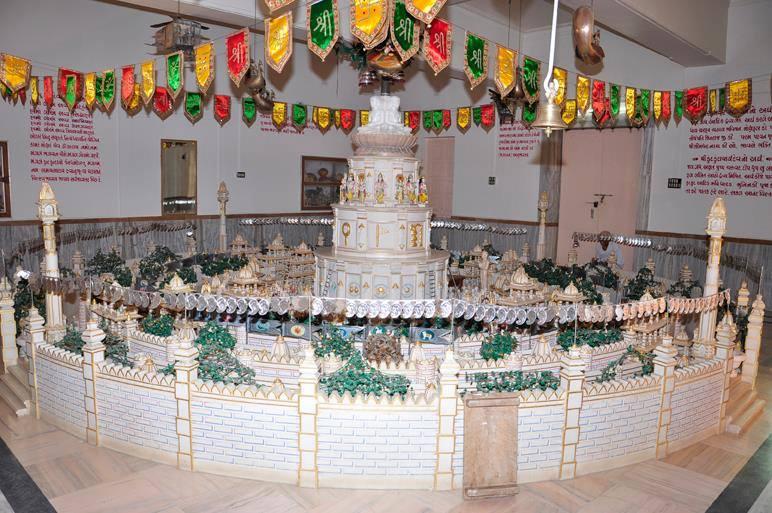
Samosharan depiction

== See also ==
- God in Jainism
