= Nakkeeran Gopal =

Indian journalist and editor (born 1959)

Nakkheeran Gopal
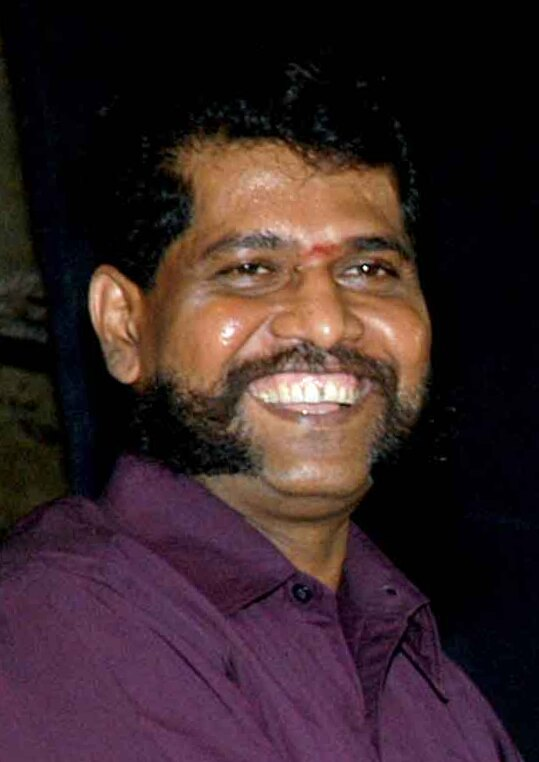
- Nakkheeran Gopal, 2006
- Born: Rajagopal; 10 April 1959 (age 67); Aruppukottai, Tamil Nadu, India
- Citizenship: India
- Occupation: Politician
- Years active: 1988 – present
- Awards: Thanthai Periyar Award
- Website: https://www.nakkheeran.in

Nakkheeran Gopal (born 10 April 1959) is a journalist and editor from Tamil Nadu, India. He is the editor and publisher of the Tamil political investigative journal Nakkheeran. He came to national fame in the 1990s when he interviewed sandalwood and ivory smuggler Veerappan, who was surviving in the forests and committing crimes on the Tamil Nadu–Karnataka border, eluding the police of the two states. Footage from his encounters with Veerappan have been used to create Koose Munisamy Veerappan (TV series).

== Early life ==
He completed his schooling at the Municipal School of Aruppukkottai and SBK Higher Secondary School. After completing a pre-university course at Devanga Arts College, he graduated with a bachelor of commerce degree from Saiva Bhanu Kshatriya College in 1977. Apart from his academics, he was part of his college hockey team and was involved in creating artworks that could be considered as one of the early signs of a contemporary layout artist and editor.

Nakkheeran Gopal started working at a provisional store. Later in 1983, he and his friend started a rubber firm with a 3000 rupee investment. Things were not proceeding well from the beginning. At times, they might even need to cycle all around the city. Things were not going well; he had turned ill and returned to his native country. Nakkheeran Gopal abstained from work for four months during his recovery but improved his artistic skills in the meantime. His friends and neighbours suggested he seek a relevant job displaying his splendid artwork.

In 1985, Nakkheeran Gopal was rightly identified by Valampuri John, the editor of Thai magazine run by the then Chief Minister M. G. Ramachandran. He received knowledge on layout work and also got exposed to production work during his venture in Thiraichuvai. However, Gopal had learned the success story when he acted as a layout director in Tharasu magazine. The readers loved the wrapper layout work that sensibly portrayed the message. He opted to move out of Tharasu at this stage due to various conflicts.

== Nakkheeran magazine ==
In 1988, he started his political investigative weekly magazine. He loved the title Nakkheeran, but it was possessed by a politician named K. Subbu. When approached, K. Subbu gave away the title, and it was titled Nakkheeran, the weekly Tamil magazine. The office was set up in a small room at Kilpauk, on the banks of the Cooum river. The first issue of Nakkheeran came out on 20 April 1988.

== Achievements ==
The editor of Nakkheeran, Nakkheeran Gopal, locked horns with the state government of Tamil Nadu in the Supreme Court of India to receive a landmark judgement in favour of press independence on 7 October 1994. This judgement was unanimously appreciated by the global media.

As an act of bravery, Nakkheeran is the first magazine to interview and expose a portrait of South India’s forest brigand Veerappan. The editor and his team effectively acted as an emissary between Veerappan and state governments to carry out a successful mission in rescuing legendary Kannada thespian Dr. Rajkumar, which calmed down the insecure atmosphere that had prevailed between two states since Rajkumar's abduction in 2000. Earlier, Gopal had successfully rescued eight forest guards kidnapped by Veerappan.

== POTA ==
In 2003, he was arrested on charges of possessing an unlicensed revolver with ammunition.

After eight months of imprisonment, Gopal was ordered to be set free on bail by a division bench of the Madras High Court while allowing a habeas corpus petition filed by his brother. Emerging out of the prison, Gopal said obtaining bail was the 'first blow' to the "autocratic rule" of Tamil Nadu Chief Minister Jayalalithaa. "This victory is Nakeeran's first step. Let the government file any number of false cases, we will emerge victorious," he said in brief remarks as he was given a rousing reception by magazine staff and others in front of the prison complex. The high court had faulted the police for not providing any reasons for his arrest under the IPC and Pota. Gopal was first arrested in April 2003 in connection with the murder of a police informant, allegedly by forest brigand Veerappan, and was subsequently charged under Pota for alleged possession of arms.

== Author ==
Nakkeeran Gopal penned a series called "Challenge" (late 1990s) and Yutham (late 2000s) in his own Nakkheeran magazine. Later, the consolidations were released as a book. "Challenge" describes the agony put forth by Jayalalithaa between 1991 and 1996, whereas his Yutham (elaborated in four parts) briefs how his team tackled the distress caused by the 2001–06 TN Govt.

== Interviews ==
- "Daredevil journalism". www.theweekendleader.com.
- "'I have 211 cases against me' - Nakkeeran Gopal on his battle with criminal defamation". www.thenewsminute.com.
