= Paramasivam =

Paramasivam may refer to:

== People ==
- Paramasivam Natarajan, an Indian photochemist (1940–2016)
- Tho. Paramasivam, an Indian Tamil anthropologist (1950–2020)
- V. P. B. Paramasivam, an Indian politician from Tamil Nadu (1980–)
- S. Paramasivam, an Indian politician
- K. P. Paramasivam, an Indian politician

== Movies ==
- Banda Paramasivam, a 2003 Indian Tamil-language comedy film
- Valayar Paramasivam, a 2004 Indian Malayalam-language gangster film

== See also ==
- Paramasivan (disambiguation)
