= Paramasivan (disambiguation) =

Paramasivan is a 2006 Indian Tamil-language action thriller film.

Paramasivan may also refer to:

- Tho. Paramasivan (1950–2020), Indian Tamil anthropologist, writer, folklorist, archeologist and professor
- S. K. Paramasivan (1919–2022), Indian politician
- S. Paramasivan (1903–1987), Indian archaeological chemist

== See also ==
- Paramasivam (disambiguation)
- Paramasivan Fathima, a 2025 Indian Tamil-language horror thriller film
