= 1989 Tamil Nadu Legislative Assembly election =

Indian election

- 21 January 1989; 11 March 1989

All 234 seats in the Legislature of Tamil Nadu 118 seats needed for a majority
- Turnout: 69.69% (▼3.78%)
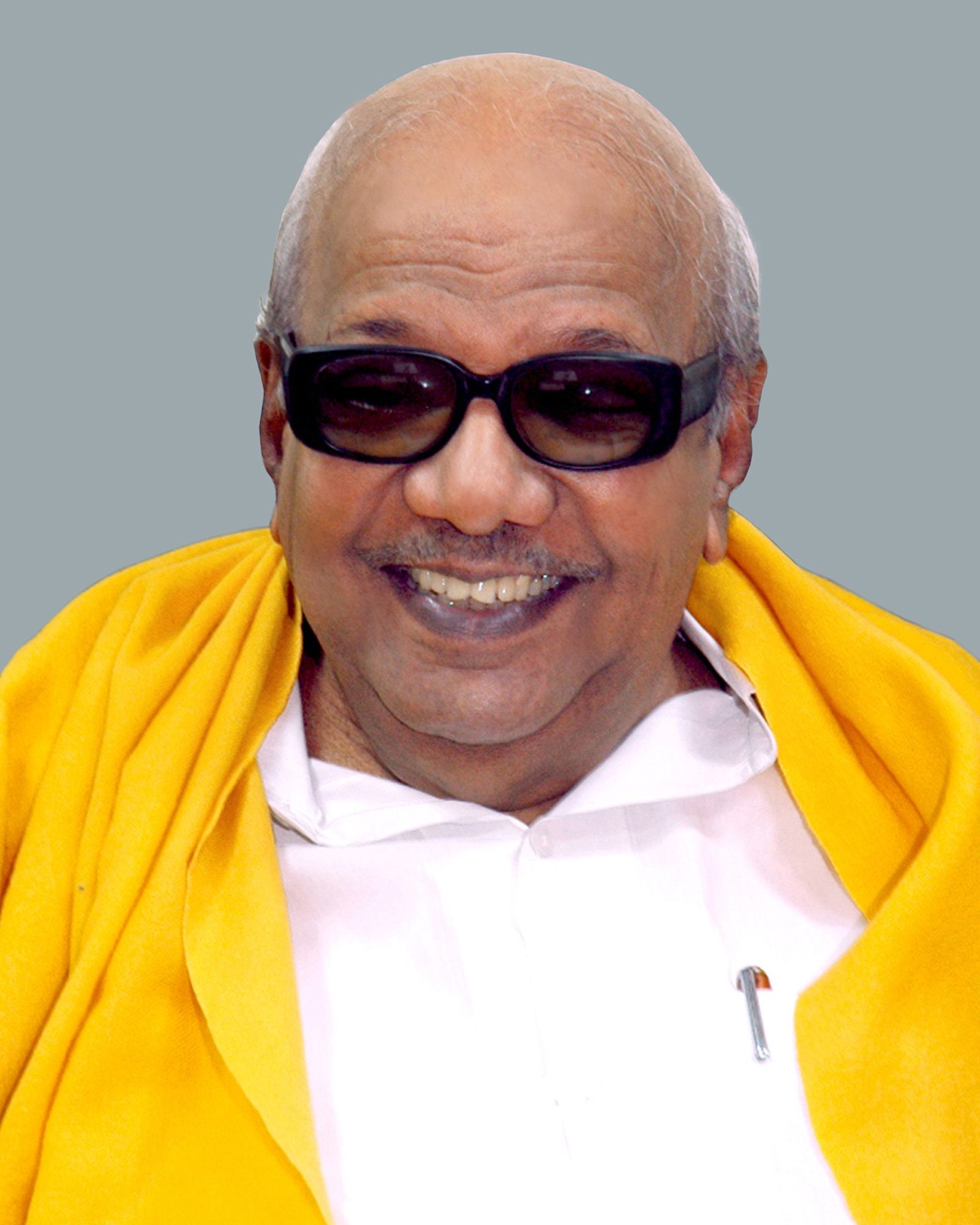

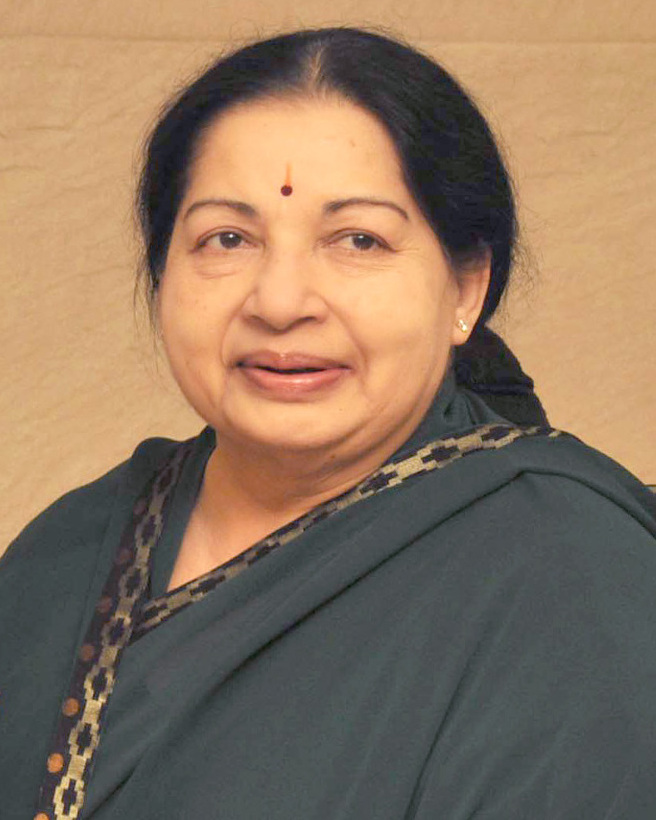

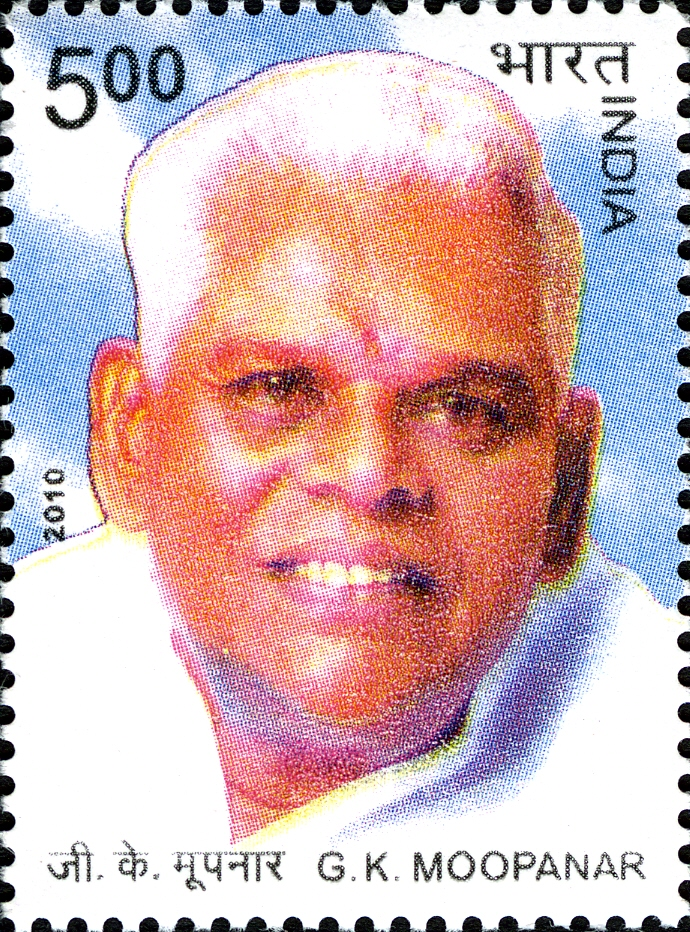
| | First party | Second party | Third party |
|---|---|---|---|
| Leader | M. Karunanidhi | J. Jayalalithaa | G. K. Moopanar |
| Party | DMK | AIADMK (J) Faction | INC(I) |
| Leader's seat | Harbour | Bodinayakkanur | Papanasam |
| Seats won | 150 | 27 | 26 |
| Seat change | ▲126 | New Party | ▼37 |
| Popular vote | 8,001,222 | 5,098,687 | 4,780,714 |
| Percentage | 33.2% | 22.2% | 19.8% |
| Swing | ▲3.9% | New | ▲3.5% |
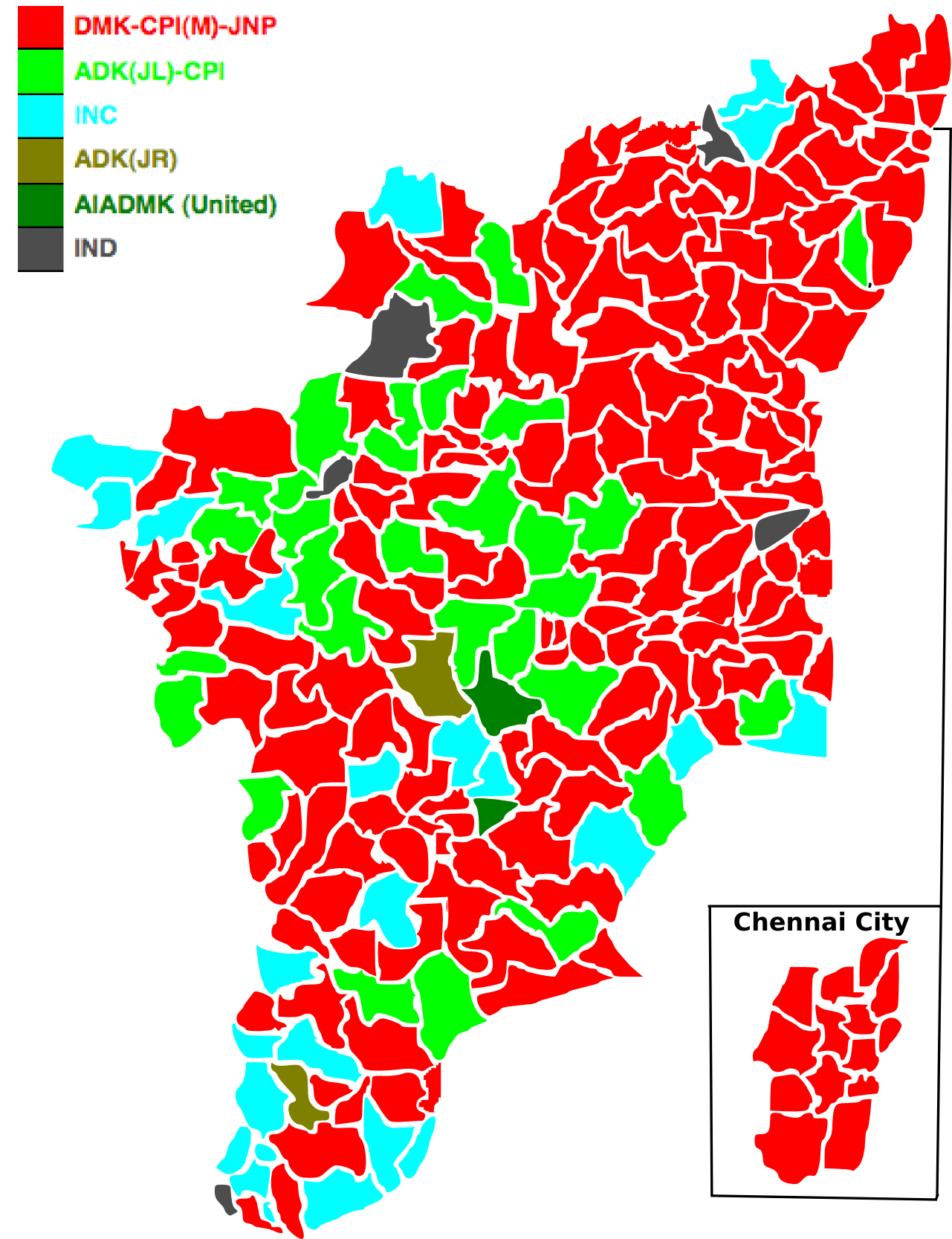
- 1989 election map (by constituencies); *Note: The Infobox does not include the 2 seats won by merged ADMK coalition in March bye-election.
Chief Minister before election
President's rule
Elected Chief Minister
M. Karunanidhi
DMK

The ninth legislative assembly election of Tamil Nadu was held on 21 January 1989. Dravida Munnetra Kazhagam (DMK) won the election and its leader M. Karunanidhi became the Chief Minister. It was his third term in office. The DMK was in power only for a short term, as it was dismissed on 31 January 1991 by the Indian Prime minister Chandra Shekhar using Article 356 of the Indian Constitution.

== Schedule ==
| Event | Date |
|---|---|
| Date for Nominations | 19 December 1988 |
| Last Date for filing Nominations | 26 December 1988 |
| Date for scrutiny of nominations | 27 December 1988 |
| Last date for withdrawal of candidatures | 29 December 1988 |
| Date of poll | 21 January 1989 |
| Date of counting | 22 January 1989 |

== Background ==
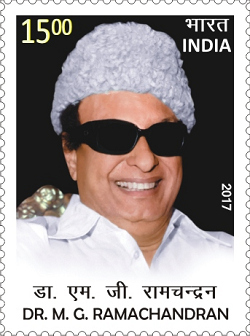
M. G. Ramachandran
1917–1987

The ninth legislative assembly election is the first election to the body after the death of the most prominent Chief Minister of Tamil Nadu, M. G. Ramachandran.

=== Split in AIADMK ===
After the death of M. G. Ramachandran (M.G.R) in December 1987, his wife V. N. Janaki Ramachandran took over as Chief Minister. She lasted less than a month in power. The All India Anna Dravida Munnetra Kazhagam (AIADMK) split into two factions, one led by Janaki and the other by J. Jayalalithaa. The undivided AIADMK legislature party had a strength of 132, including the Speaker P. H. Pandian. 97 of them supported the Janaki faction while 33 backed the Jayalalithaa group. Speaker Pandian was a supporter of Janaki. He did not recognize the Jayalalithaa group as a separate party. On 28 January 1988, Janaki sought a vote of confidence in the Assembly. The Jayalalithaa group abstained from the Assembly, and Pandian disqualified all of them. Earlier in December 1986, 10 MLAs of the DMK had been expelled from the Assembly by Pandian for their participation in the anti-Hindi agitation of 1986, bringing down the strength of the house to 224. The disqualification of the 33 MLAs of the Jayalalithaa group by P.H.Pandian further reduced the assembly's strength to 191. This enabled Janaki to win the vote of confidence with the support of only 99 members (with 8 opposing votes and 3 neutrals). Other opposition parties boycotted the vote - only 111 members were present during the motion. Though she won the vote of confidence, her government was dismissed by Prime Minister Rajiv Gandhi on 30 January, citing the disruptions in the assembly. After a year of President's rule, elections were again held in January 1989. Both the AIADMK factions claimed to be the official AIADMK and requested the election commission to grant the "two leaves" symbol of the AIADMK to them. However, the Election Commission refused to recognize either of them as the official AIADMK and temporarily froze the "two leaves" symbol on 17 December 1988. Instead, it awarded the "cock" symbol to the Jayalalithaa faction (AIADMK(J)), while the Janaki faction (AIADMK(JA)) was given the "two doves" symbol. Jayalalithaa had handpicked the “Rooster” symbol, the same symbol C. N. Annadurai had contested with in Kancheepuram during the 1957 Assembly elections when his dmk entered the election foray for the first time. According to local political observers, the allocation of the Rooster symbol was seen as potentially advantageous for Jayalalithaa faction, as polling was scheduled for 21 January, coinciding with the festival of Thaipusam that year, which is associated with Murugan, whose standard bears the rooster emblem. Commentators also noted that Jayalalithaa had earlier acted alongside M. G. Ramachandran in a sequence in the film Thanippiravi, in which he portrayed Murugan. In the days following the symbol’s allotment, the city of Madras saw widespread display of film posters featuring the two actors.

=== Coalitions ===
The Tamil Nadu unit of the Indian National Congress initially decided to ally with the Jayalalithaa faction. This move was opposed by actor and Congress leader Sivaji Ganesan. On 10 February 1988, he left the party along with his supporters to form a new party Thamizhaga Munnetra Munnani. Ganesan's party allied itself with the Janaki faction. Eventually, the Congress also contested the elections alone.

The DMK was part of the Janata Dal led National Front. The front initially included both the Communist Party of India (CPI) and Communist Party of India (Marxist) (CPM). However, in the election only Janata Dal and CPM had a seat sharing agreement with the DMK. The CPI allied itself with the AIADMK(J).

This election attracted an unusually high level of attention at the national level. It was seen as a precursor for the General election of 1989, a test of Rajiv Gandhi's popularity and P.H.Pandian's popularity as a speaker claiming sky-high powers. The Tamil Nadu Congress (under G. K. Moopanar) was contesting elections alone after a gap of twelve years, and Rajiv Gandhi campaigned extensively, making multiple campaign visits to Tamil Nadu. V. P. Singh and Jyoti Basu, the national front leaders of Janata Dal and CPM respectively, also campaigned for the DMK-led front in Tamil Nadu.

== Seat allotments ==
=== United Front ===
DMK-led Alliance
| Party | Flag | Symbol | Leader | Seats | |
| Dravida Munnetra Kazhagam | | | M. Karunanidhi | 198 | 203 |
| Muslim League (Lathief) | | | M. Abdul Latheif | 4 | 203 |
| Tamil Nadu Forward Bloc | | | P. N. Vallarasu | 1 | 203 |
| Communist Party of India (Marxist) | | | A. Nallasivam | 21 | |
| Janata Party | | | Era. Sezhiyan | 10 | |
| Total | | | | 234 | |

=== AIADMK (Jayalalitha) Alliance ===
AIADMK(J)-led Alliance
| Party | Flag | Symbol | Leader | Seats | |
| All India Anna Dravida Munnetra Kazhagam (Jayalalitha) | | | J. Jayalalithaa | 197 | 201 |
| Republican Party of India (Khobragade) | | | | 2 | 201 |
| Uzhavar Uzhaippalar Katchi (Chellamuthu) | | | Chellamuthu | 2 | 201 |
| Tamil Nadu Janata Party (Note: Pon. Vijayaraghavan-led- Janata Party contested as independents and they were commonly allotted Elephant symbol, which was a free symbol in 1989) | | | Pon. Vijayaraghavan | 18 | |
| Communist Party of India | | | P. Manickam | 13 | |
| All India Anna Dravida Munnetra Kazhagam | | | J. Jayalalithaa | 2^{†} | |
| Total | | | | 234 | |

†: The two seats that were delayed were contested by a united AIADMK front (AIADMK(JA) & AIADMK(J)), under the leader Jayalalithaa in a bye-election.

=== AIADMK (Janaki) Alliance ===
AIADMK(JA)-led Alliance
| Party | Flag | Symbol | Leader | Seats | |
| All India Anna Dravida Munnetra Kazhagam (Janaki) | | | V. N. Janaki Ramachandran | 175 | 177 |
| Tamil Nadu Peasants and Workers Party | | | Pon. Kumar | 2 | 177 |
| Thamizhaga Munnetra Munnani | | | Sivaji Ganesan | 49 | |
| All India Forward Bloc | | | S. Andi Thevar | 6 | |
| Total | | | | 232 | |

=== Congress Front ===
Congress (I)-led Alliance
| Party | Flag | Symbol | Leader | Seats | |
| Indian National Congress (I) | | | G. K. Moopanar | 210 | 217 |
| Ambedkar Makkal Iyakkam (Balasundaram) | | | | 4 | 217 |
| Republican Party of India (Gavai) | | | | 1 | 217 |
| Christian Democratic Front | | | | 1 | 217 |
| Forward Bloc (Kanthasamy) | | | | 1 | 217 |
| United Communist Party of India | | | D. Pandian | 9 | |
| Muslim League (Samad) | | | A. K. A. Abdul Samad | 8 | |
| Total | | | | 234 | |

=== Others ===
| Party | Flag | Symbol | Leader | Seats |
|---|---|---|---|---|
| Bharatiya Janata Party | | | K. N. Lakshmanan | 31 |
| All India Anna Dravida Munnetra Kazhagam (Nedunchezhiyan) | | | V. R. Nedunchezhiyan | 19 |

== Opinion poll trends ==
The Tamil weekly Tharasu conducted statewide opinion polls using its correspondents and published the results. It correctly predicted a victory for the Dravida Munnetra Kazhagam in the 1989 Tamil Nadu Assembly election held after the death of MGR. It also projected that Jayalalithaa would emerge as the Leader of the Opposition. The survey further indicated that the faction led by V. N. Janaki would fail to win any seats; however, P. H. Pandian won from the Cheranmadevi Assembly constituency, marking a minor deviation from the prediction. Additionally, while some expected Congress leader G. K. Moopanar to win and become Chief Minister, the survey had ruled out such a possibility. During the same election, Ananda Vikatan carried out a reader-based survey by distributing ballot-style forms, which also yielded accurate results. According to its editor Tharasu Shyam, Tharasu similarly conducted opinion polls during the subsequent 1991 and 1996 Assembly elections, and their predictions were accurate.

== Voting and results ==
The election for 232 constituencies was held on 21 January 1989. The turnout among registered voters was 69.69%. Elections could not be held for two constituencies -Marungapuri and Madurai East - due to technical reasons. For these two elections were conducted later on 11 March 1989. Since the two AIADMK factions had merged in February 1989 under the leadership of Jayalalithaa, the Election Commission restored the "Two Leaves" symbol to the unified AIADMK for these elections. The unified AIADMK won both the seats.

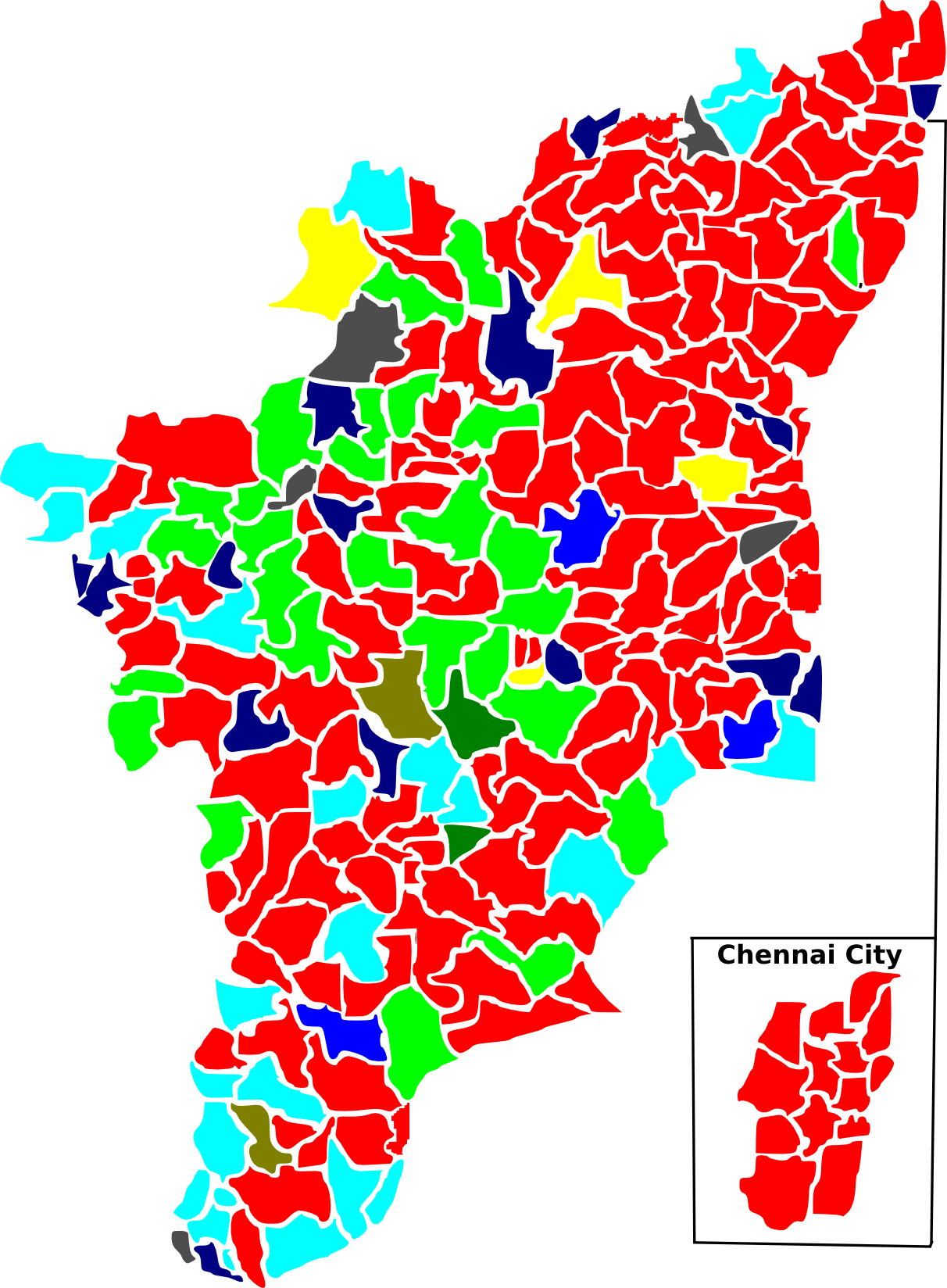
Election map of results based on parties. Colours are based on the results table on the left

=== Results by Pre-Poll Alliance ===
Summary of the 1989 January Tamil Nadu Legislative Assembly election results
| Alliance/Party | Seats won | Change^{†} | Popular Vote | Vote % | Adj. %^{‡} |
|---|---|---|---|---|---|
| DMK+ alliance | 169 | +137 | 9,135,220 | 37.9% | |
| DMK | 150 | +126 | 8,001,222 | 33.2% | 38.7% |
| CPI(M) | 15 | +10 | 851,351 | 3.5% | 36.5% |
| JNP | 4 | +1 | 282,647 | 1.2% | 29.1% |
| AIADMK(J)+ alliance | 30 | -5 | 5,393,857 | 22.4% | |
| AIADMK(J) | 27 | -6 | 5,098,687 | 22.2% | 25.0% |
| CPI | 3 | +1 | 295,170 | 1.2% | 21.3% |
| Others | 33 | -132 | 9,160,163 | 38.0% | |
| INC | 26 | -37 | 4,780,714 | 19.8% | 21.8% |
| AIADMK(JA) | 2 | -95 | 2,214,965 | 9.2% | 12.2% |
| IND | 5 | +1 | 2,164,484 | 9.0% | 9.1% |
| Total | 232 | – | 24,111,468 | 100% | – |

Sources: Election Commission of India

=== Results by district ===
| District | Seats | | | | |
| District | Seats | DMK+ | ADK+ | INC | OTH |
| Chengalpattu | 17 | 15 | 1 | 1 | —N/a |
| Madras | 14 | 14 | —N/a | —N/a | —N/a |
| North Arcot | 21 | 19 | —N/a | 1 | 1 |
| South Arcot | 21 | 20 | —N/a | —N/a | 1 |
| Dharmapuri | 10 | 6 | 2 | 1 | 1 |
| Salem | 17 | 11 | 6 | —N/a | —N/a |
| Coimbatore | 17 | 10 | 5 | 2 | —N/a |
| Erode | 8 | 3 | 4 | —N/a | 1 |
| Nilgiris | 3 | 1 | —N/a | 2 | —N/a |
| Tiruchirapalli | 18 | 12 | 6 | —N/a | —N/a |
| Thanjavur | 20 | 16 | 1 | 3 | —N/a |
| Pudukottai | 5 | 3 | 2 | —N/a | —N/a |
| Sivaganga | 6 | 5 | —N/a | —N/a | —N/a |
| Ramanathapuram | 4 | 3 | 1 | 1 | —N/a |
| Virudunagar | 6 | 5 | —N/a | 1 | —N/a |
| Dindigul | 7 | 4 | —N/a | 2 | 1 |
| Madurai | 15 | 12 | 2 | 1 | —N/a |
| Thoothukudi | 7 | 3 | 2 | 2 | —N/a |
| Tirunelveli | 11 | 5 | —N/a | 5 | 1 |
| Kanyakumari | 7 | 2 | —N/a | 4 | 1 |
| Total | 234 | 169 | 32 | 26 | 7 |

=== By Region ===
Alliance-wise Results
| Region | Total Seats | DMK-led Alliance | AIADMK(J)-CPI Alliance | Indian National Congress |
|---|---|---|---|---|
| Northern Tamil Nadu | 73 | 68 / 73 (93%) | 1 / 73 (1%) | 2 / 73 (3%) |
| Western Tamil Nadu | 55 | 31 / 55 (56%) | 17 / 55 (31%) | 5 / 55 (9%) |
| Southern TamilNadu | 63 | 39 / 63 (62%) | 5 / 63 (8%) | 16 / 63 (25%) |
| Central TamilNadu | 43 | 31 / 43 (72%) | 9 / 43 (21%) | 3 / 43 (7%) |

=== Results by constituency ===
| District | Constituency | | Winner | | | | Runner Up | | | | Margin | % |
| District | # | Name | Candidate | Party | Votes | % | Candidate | Party | Votes | % | Margin | % |
|---|---|---|---|---|---|---|---|---|---|---|---|---|
| Madras | 1 | Royapuram | R. Mathivanan | DMK | 37,742 | 45.95 | K. Arumugaswamy | IND | 25,976 | 31.62 | 11,766 | 14.33 |
| Madras | 2 | Harbour | M. Karunanidhi | DMK | 41,632 | 59.76 | K. A. Wahab | IUML | 9,641 | 13.84 | 31,991 | 45.92 |
| Madras | 3 | Dr. R. K. Nagar | S. P. Sarkunam | DMK | 54,216 | 45.31 | E. Madhusudhanan | ADK(J) | 29,960 | 25.04 | 24,256 | 20.27 |
| Madras | 4 | Park Town | A. Rahmankhan | DMK | 37,083 | 49.25 | Babuji Gautam | ADK(J) | 16,940 | 22.50 | 20,143 | 26.75 |
| Madras | 5 | Perambur (SC) | Chengai Sivam | DMK | 65,681 | 53.86 | P. Viswanathan | INC | 25,691 | 21.07 | 39,990 | 32.79 |
| Madras | 6 | Purasawalkam | Arcot N. Veerasamy | DMK | 68,640 | 49.88 | B. Ranganathan | ADK(J) | 30,376 | 22.07 | 38,264 | 27.81 |
| Madras | 7 | Egmore (SC) | Elamvazhuthi | DMK | 38,032 | 49.80 | Polur Varadhan | INC | 17,063 | 22.34 | 20,969 | 27.46 |
| Madras | 8 | Anna Nagar | K. Anbazhagan | DMK | 71,401 | 49.94 | V. Sukumar Babu | ADK(J) | 38,994 | 27.28 | 32,407 | 22.66 |
| Madras | 9 | Theagaraya Nagar | S. A. Ganesan | DMK | 49,772 | 43.03 | K. Souirajan | INC | 27,668 | 23.92 | 22,104 | 19.11 |
| Madras | 10 | Thousand Lights | M. K. Stalin | DMK | 50,818 | 50.59 | S. S. R. Thambidurai | ADK(J) | 30,184 | 30.05 | 20,634 | 20.54 |
| Madras | 11 | Chepauk | M. A. Latheef | DMK | 33,104 | 50.21 | S. M. Hidayathulla | INC | 14,751 | 22.38 | 18,353 | 27.83 |
| Madras | 12 | Triplicane | Nanjil K. Manoharan | DMK | 36,414 | 45.86 | H. V. Hande | ADK(J) | 26,442 | 33.30 | 9,972 | 12.56 |
| Madras | 13 | Mylapore | N. Ganapathy | DMK | 48,461 | 40.88 | Sarojinivaradappan | ADK(J) | 30,266 | 25.53 | 18,195 | 15.35 |
| Madras | 14 | Saidapet | R. S. Sridhar | DMK | 57,767 | 47.05 | Saidai S. Durasmay | ADK(JA) | 25,178 | 20.51 | 32,589 | 26.54 |
| Chengalpattu | 15 | Gummidipundi | K. Venu | DMK | 36,803 | 37.33 | K. Gopal | ADK(J) | 33,273 | 33.75 | 3,530 | 3.58 |
| Chengalpattu | 16 | Ponneri (SC) | K. Sundaram | DMK | 51,928 | 44.53 | K. Tamizharasan | ADK(J) | 44,321 | 38.01 | 7,607 | 6.52 |
| Chengalpattu | 17 | Thiruvottiyur | T. K. Palanisamy | DMK | 67,849 | 45.58 | J. Rama Chandran | ADK(J) | 46,777 | 31.42 | 21,072 | 14.16 |
| Chengalpattu | 18 | Villivakkam | W. R. Varadarajan | CPI(M) | 99,571 | 46.77 | D. Balasubramaniam | ADK(J) | 40,150 | 18.86 | 59,421 | 27.91 |
| Chengalpattu | 19 | Alandur | C. Shanmugam | DMK | 67,985 | 42.88 | K. Adaikalam | ADK(J) | 41,976 | 26.48 | 26,009 | 16.40 |
| Chengalpattu | 20 | Tambaram | M. A. Vaithlyaligam | DMK | 90,007 | 47.03 | A. J. Doss | INC | 43,746 | 22.86 | 46,261 | 24.17 |
| Chengalpattu | 21 | Tirupporur (SC) | D. Thirumurthy | DMK | 33,638 | 40.65 | M. Govindarajan | ADK(J) | 30,126 | 36.41 | 3,512 | 4.24 |
| Chengalpattu | 22 | Chengalpattu | V. Tamilmani | DMK | 38,948 | 45.73 | C. D. Varadarajan | ADK(J) | 22,607 | 26.54 | 16,341 | 19.19 |
| Chengalpattu | 23 | Maduranthakam | S. D. Ugamchand | ADK(J) | 38,704 | 41.93 | C. Arumugam | DMK | 35,196 | 38.13 | 3,508 | 3.80 |
| Chengalpattu | 24 | Acharapakkam (SC) | E. Ramakrishnan | DMK | 40,609 | 51.62 | P. Singaram | ADK(JA) | 12,716 | 16.16 | 27,893 | 35.46 |
| Chengalpattu | 25 | Uthiramerur | K. Sundar | DMK | 31,304 | 34.71 | P. Sundar Raman | ADK(J) | 20,175 | 22.37 | 11,129 | 12.34 |
| Chengalpattu | 26 | Kancheepuram | P. Murugesan | DMK | 53,821 | 47.66 | S. S. Thirunavukkarasu | ADK(J) | 32,408 | 28.70 | 21,413 | 18.96 |
| Chengalpattu | 27 | Sriperumbudur (SC) | E. Kothandam | DMK | 38,496 | 42.21 | Arulupugazhenthi | ADK(J) | 32,106 | 35.20 | 6,390 | 7.01 |
| Chengalpattu | 28 | Poonamallee | T. R. Masilamani | DMK | 58,640 | 48.11 | G. Ananthakrishna | INC | 29,345 | 24.07 | 29,295 | 24.04 |
| Chengalpattu | 29 | Tiruvallur | S. R. Munirathinam | DMK | 45,091 | 47.18 | M. Selvaraj | ADK(J) | 22,852 | 23.91 | 22,239 | 23.27 |
| Chengalpattu | 30 | Tiruttani | P. Natarajan | DMK | 35,555 | 41.88 | Munu Adhi | ADK(J) | 26,432 | 31.14 | 9,123 | 10.74 |
| Chengalpattu | 31 | Pallipet | A. Eakambara Reddy | INC | 30,417 | 30.46 | P. M. Narasimhan | ADK(J) | 26,040 | 26.07 | 4,377 | 4.39 |
| North Arcot | 32 | Arkonam (SC) | V. K. Raju | DMK | 42,511 | 46.78 | P. Rajakumar | INC | 20,538 | 22.60 | 21,973 | 24.18 |
| North Arcot | 33 | Sholinghur | A. M. Munirathinam | INC | 33,419 | 39.24 | C. Manickam | DMK | 28,161 | 33.06 | 5,258 | 6.18 |
| North Arcot | 34 | Ranipet | J. Hassain | IND | 27,724 | 30.08 | M. Kuppusami | DMK | 23,784 | 25.80 | 3,940 | 4.28 |
| North Arcot | 35 | Arcot | T. R. Gajapathy | DMK | 34,775 | 36.50 | K. V. Ramdoss | ADK(J) | 20,470 | 21.49 | 14,305 | 15.01 |
| North Arcot | 36 | Katpadi | Duraimurugan | DMK | 43,181 | 43.41 | R. Margabandu | ADK(J) | 23,344 | 23.47 | 19,837 | 19.94 |
| North Arcot | 37 | Gudiyatham | K. R. Sundaram | CPI(M) | 22,037 | 23.46 | R. Venugopal | ADK(J) | 19,958 | 21.24 | 2,079 | 2.22 |
| North Arcot | 38 | Pernambut (SC) | V. Govindan | DMK | 42,264 | 42.94 | I. Tamilarasan | ADK(J) | 30,818 | 31.31 | 11,446 | 11.63 |
| North Arcot | 39 | Vaniayambadi | P. Abdul Samad | DMK | 39,723 | 41.20 | N. Kulasekara Pandiyan | ADK(J) | 22,614 | 23.45 | 17,109 | 17.75 |
| North Arcot | 40 | Natrampalli | R. Mahendran | DMK | 36,774 | 32.00 | A. R. Rajendran | ADK(J) | 27,193 | 23.66 | 9,581 | 8.34 |
| North Arcot | 41 | Tiruppattur | B. Sundaram | DMK | 40,998 | 35.92 | S. P. Manavalan | INC | 27,541 | 24.13 | 13,457 | 11.79 |
| North Arcot | 42 | Chengam (SC) | M. Settu | JP | 26,256 | 34.74 | P. Veerapandiyan | ADK(J) | 22,344 | 29.56 | 3,912 | 5.18 |
| North Arcot | 43 | Thandarambattu | D. Ponnumudi | DMK | 48,048 | 45.62 | K. F. Velu | ADK(JA) | 28,519 | 27.08 | 19,529 | 18.54 |
| North Arcot | 44 | Tiruvannamalai | K. Pitchandi | DMK | 57,556 | 54.61 | A. S. Ravindran | INC | 23,154 | 21.97 | 34,402 | 32.64 |
| North Arcot | 45 | Kalasapakkam | P. S. Thiruvengadam | DMK | 47,535 | 48.24 | S. Krishnamurthy | ADK(J) | 25,840 | 26.22 | 21,695 | 22.02 |
| North Arcot | 46 | Polur | A. Rajendran | DMK | 31,478 | 38.80 | S. Kannan | ADK(J) | 21,334 | 26.29 | 10,144 | 12.51 |
| North Arcot | 47 | Anaicut | S. P. Kannan | DMK | 25,709 | 35.64 | Visvanathan | ADK(J) | 22,886 | 31.73 | 2,823 | 3.91 |
| North Arcot | 48 | Vellore | V. M. Devaraj | DMK | 50,470 | 47.37 | P. Neelakandan | ADK(J) | 31,110 | 29.20 | 19,360 | 18.17 |
| North Arcot | 49 | Arni | A. C. Dayalan | DMK | 38,558 | 36.21 | D. Karunakaran | ADK(J) | 30,891 | 29.01 | 7,667 | 7.20 |
| North Arcot | 50 | Cheyyar | V. Anbalagan | DMK | 46,376 | 46.75 | M. Krisnhaswamy | INC | 22,993 | 23.18 | 23,383 | 23.57 |
| North Arcot | 51 | Vandavasi (SC) | V. Dhanaraj | DMK | 35,264 | 43.54 | T. S. Govindan | INC | 21,176 | 26.15 | 14,088 | 17.39 |
| North Arcot | 52 | Peranamallur | R. Ettiyappan | DMK | 41,908 | 45.86 | Jaison Jacob | ADK(J) | 24,588 | 26.90 | 17,320 | 18.96 |
| South Arcot | 53 | Melmalayanur | R. Panchatcharam | DMK | 46,653 | 46.66 | P. U. Shanmugam | ADK(JA) | 33,866 | 33.87 | 12,787 | 12.79 |
| South Arcot | 54 | Gingee | N. Ramachandiran | DMK | 38,415 | 42.29 | V. Ranganathan | IND | 15,785 | 17.38 | 22,630 | 24.91 |
| South Arcot | 55 | Tindivanam | R. Masilamani | DMK | 39,504 | 48.05 | K. Ramamurthi | INC | 28,749 | 34.97 | 10,755 | 13.08 |
| South Arcot | 56 | Vanur (SC) | A. Marimuthu | DMK | 42,825 | 48.24 | C. Krishnan | INC | 20,813 | 23.44 | 22,012 | 24.80 |
| South Arcot | 57 | Kandamangalam (SC) | S. Alaguvelu | DMK | 40,624 | 46.94 | M. Kannan | ADK(JA) | 15,433 | 17.83 | 25,191 | 29.11 |
| South Arcot | 58 | Villupuram | K. Ponmudy | DMK | 45,145 | 47.18 | S. Abdul Latheef | INC | 22,380 | 23.39 | 22,765 | 23.79 |
| South Arcot | 59 | Mugaiyur | A. G. Sampath | DMK | 43,585 | 45.22 | M. Longan | INC | 29,599 | 30.71 | 13,986 | 14.51 |
| South Arcot | 60 | Thirunavalur | A. V. Balasubramaniyan | DMK | 38,948 | 41.46 | P. Kannan | ADK(J) | 21,640 | 23.03 | 17,308 | 18.43 |
| South Arcot | 61 | Ulundurpet (SC) | K. Angamuthu | DMK | 44,422 | 41.63 | V. Selvaraj | INC | 32,517 | 30.47 | 11,905 | 11.16 |
| South Arcot | 62 | Nellikuppam | C. Govindarajan | CPI(M) | 26,233 | 31.88 | N. V. Jayaseelan | IND | 14,804 | 17.99 | 11,429 | 13.89 |
| South Arcot | 63 | Cuddalore | E. Pugazhendi | DMK | 42,790 | 42.91 | M. Radhakrishnan | INC | 22,408 | 22.47 | 20,382 | 20.44 |
| South Arcot | 64 | Panruti | K. Nanda Gopalakirutinan | DMK | 52,395 | 56.24 | R. Devasudaram | ADK(J) | 17,487 | 18.77 | 34,908 | 37.47 |
| South Arcot | 65 | Kurinjipadi | N. Ganeshmurthy | DMK | 44,887 | 47.14 | R. Rasendran | ADK(J) | 16,043 | 16.85 | 28,844 | 30.29 |
| South Arcot | 66 | Bhuvanagiri | S. Sivalogam | DMK | 39,430 | 46.50 | R. Rathakrishnan | IND | 17,553 | 20.70 | 21,877 | 25.80 |
| South Arcot | 67 | Kattumannarkoil (SC) | A. Thangaraju | IND | 30,877 | 39.41 | E. Ramalingam | DMK | 27,036 | 34.50 | 3,841 | 4.91 |
| South Arcot | 68 | Chidambaram | D. Krishnamoorthy | DMK | 35,738 | 42.14 | A. Radhakrishnan | INC | 19,018 | 22.42 | 16,720 | 19.72 |
| South Arcot | 69 | Vridhachalam | G. Bhuvarahan | JP | 33,005 | 35.47 | R. D. Aranganathan | ADK(J) | 18,469 | 19.85 | 14,536 | 15.62 |
| South Arcot | 70 | Mangalore (SC) | V. Ganesan | DMK | 39,831 | 42.69 | K. Ramalingam | ADK(J) | 19,072 | 20.44 | 20,759 | 22.25 |
| South Arcot | 71 | Rishivandiam | Ekal M. Netesa Vdyar | DMK | 48,030 | 46.96 | S. Sivaraj | INC | 42,069 | 41.13 | 5,961 | 5.83 |
| South Arcot | 72 | Chinnasalem | T. Udhayasuriyan | DMK | 36,776 | 36.28 | K. R. Ramalingam | ADK(J) | 23,238 | 22.93 | 13,538 | 13.35 |
| South Arcot | 73 | Sankarapuram | M. Muthaiyan | DMK | 35,438 | 33.08 | S. Kalitheerathan | ADK(JA) | 25,421 | 23.73 | 10,017 | 9.35 |
| Dharmapuri | 74 | Hosur | N. Ramachandra Reddy | INC | 37,934 | 39.78 | B. Venkatasamy | JP | 35,873 | 37.62 | 2,061 | 2.16 |
| Dharmapuri | 75 | Thalli | D. C. Vijayendriah | JP | 39,773 | 45.96 | K. V. V. Venugopal | INC | 18,810 | 21.74 | 20,963 | 24.22 |
| Dharmapuri | 76 | Kaveripattinam | V. C. Govindasami | DMK | 37,612 | 37.17 | P. Minisamy | ADK(J) | 33,628 | 33.23 | 3,984 | 3.94 |
| Dharmapuri | 77 | Krishnagiri | K. Kanchana | DMK | 35,042 | 39.28 | K. C. Krishnan | ADK(J) | 21,056 | 23.60 | 13,986 | 15.68 |
| Dharmapuri | 78 | Bargur | K. R. Rajendran | ADK(J) | 30,551 | 30.27 | E. G. Sugavanam | DMK | 29,522 | 29.25 | 1,029 | 1.02 |
| Dharmapuri | 79 | Harur (SC) | M. Annamalai | CPI(M) | 28,324 | 31.68 | A. Anbazhagan | ADK(J) | 26,447 | 29.58 | 1,877 | 2.10 |
| Dharmapuri | 80 | Morappur | V. IUMLlaiventhan | DMK | 34,038 | 40.60 | M. G. Sekhar | ADK(J) | 25,531 | 30.46 | 8,507 | 10.14 |
| Dharmapuri | 81 | Palacode | K. Madhapan | ADK(J) | 37,168 | 38.77 | T. Chandrasekar | DMK | 32,668 | 34.08 | 4,500 | 4.69 |
| Dharmapuri | 82 | Dharmapuri | R. Chinnasamy | DMK | 32,794 | 45.62 | P. Ponnuswamy | INC | 20,243 | 28.16 | 12,551 | 17.46 |
| Dharmapuri | 83 | Pennagaram | N. Nanjappan | IND | 15,498 | 21.09 | P. Srinivasan | ADK(J) | 14,555 | 19.81 | 943 | 1.28 |
| Salem | 84 | Mettur | M. Sreerangan | CPI(M) | 23,308 | 25.61 | K. Gurusamy | ADK(JA) | 22,180 | 24.37 | 1,128 | 1.24 |
| Salem | 85 | Taramangalam | K. Arjunan | ADK(J) | 15,818 | 25.49 | P. Kandasamy | IND | 14,165 | 22.82 | 1,653 | 2.67 |
| Salem | 86 | Omalur | C. Krishnan | ADK(J) | 32,275 | 42.35 | K. Chinnaraju | DMK | 21,793 | 28.60 | 10,482 | 13.75 |
| Salem | 87 | Yercaud (ST) | C. Perumal | ADK(J) | 26,355 | 36.20 | V. Dhanakodi | DMK | 19,914 | 27.35 | 6,441 | 8.85 |
| Salem | 88 | Salem-I | K. R. G. Dhanabalan | DMK | 49,498 | 43.67 | C. N. K. A. Periasamy | IND | 26,837 | 23.68 | 22,661 | 19.99 |
| Salem | 89 | Salem-II | S. Arumugam | DMK | 45,358 | 43.52 | M. Natesan | ADK(J) | 24,593 | 23.60 | 20,765 | 19.92 |
| Salem | 90 | Veerapandi | P. Venkatachalam | DMK | 36,040 | 34.53 | S. K. Selvam | ADK(J) | 31,899 | 30.56 | 4,141 | 3.97 |
| Salem | 91 | Panamarathupatty | S. R. Sivalingam | DMK | 29,805 | 31.89 | P. Thangavelan | ADK(J) | 27,980 | 29.94 | 1,825 | 1.95 |
| Salem | 92 | Attur | A. M. Ramasamy | DMK | 33,620 | 38.22 | M. P. Subramaniam | ADK(J) | 27,795 | 31.60 | 5,825 | 6.62 |
| Salem | 93 | Talavasal (SC) | S. Gunasekaran | DMK | 32,309 | 33.93 | T. Rajambal | ADK(J) | 26,230 | 27.54 | 6,079 | 6.39 |
| Salem | 94 | Rasipuram | A. Subbu | DMK | 39,534 | 35.75 | V. Thamilarasu | ADK(J) | 39,074 | 35.33 | 460 | 0.42 |
| Salem | 95 | Sendamangalam (ST) | K. Chinnasamy | ADK(J) | 36,489 | 37.46 | C. Alagappan | DMK | 31,452 | 32.29 | 5,037 | 5.17 |
| Salem | 96 | Namakkal (SC) | P. Duraisamy | DMK | 41,979 | 35.57 | S. Raju | ADK(J) | 37,636 | 31.89 | 4,343 | 3.68 |
| Salem | 97 | Kapilamalai | K. A. Mani | ADK(J) | 46,223 | 41.27 | K. S. Moorthy | DMK | 37,757 | 33.71 | 8,466 | 7.56 |
| Salem | 98 | Tiruchengode | V. Ramasamy | CPI(M) | 53,346 | 34.91 | R. Rajan | ADK(J) | 35,258 | 23.08 | 18,088 | 11.83 |
| Salem | 99 | Sankari (SC) | R. Varadarajan | DMK | 43,365 | 41.72 | R. Dhanapal | ADK(J) | 35,496 | 34.15 | 7,869 | 7.57 |
| Salem | 100 | Edappadi | Edappadi K. Palaniswami | ADK(J) | 30,765 | 33.08 | L. Palanisamy | DMK | 29,401 | 31.62 | 1,364 | 1.46 |
| Coimbatore | 101 | Mettupalayam | V. M. Gopalakrishnan | INC | 34,194 | 28.21 | V. M. Jayaraman | ADK(J) | 27,034 | 22.30 | 7,160 | 5.91 |
| Coimbatore | 102 | Avanashi (SC) | R. Annanambi | ADK(J) | 33,964 | 32.60 | C. T. Dhandapani | DMK | 31,806 | 30.53 | 2,158 | 2.07 |
| Coimbatore | 103 | Thondamuthur | U. K. Vellingiri | CPI(M) | 62,305 | 42.05 | P. Shanmugam | ADK(J) | 40,702 | 27.47 | 21,603 | 14.58 |
| Coimbatore | 104 | Singanallur | Era Mohan | DMK | 63,827 | 49.40 | P. L. Subbiah | INC | 25,589 | 19.81 | 38,238 | 29.59 |
| Coimbatore | 105 | Coimbatore West | M. Ramanathan | DMK | 39,667 | 43.80 | T. S. Balasubramanian | ADK(J) | 13,982 | 15.44 | 25,685 | 28.36 |
| Coimbatore | 106 | Coimbatore East | K. Ramani | CPI(M) | 37,397 | 39.31 | E. Ramakrishnan | INC | 29,272 | 30.77 | 8,125 | 8.54 |
| Coimbatore | 107 | Perur | A. Natarajan | DMK | 64,565 | 47.40 | V. D. Balasubramanian | IND | 34,632 | 25.42 | 29,933 | 21.98 |
| Coimbatore | 108 | Kinathukkadavu | K. Kandasamy | DMK | 36,897 | 37.51 | N. Appadurai | ADK(J) | 22,824 | 23.20 | 14,073 | 14.31 |
| Coimbatore | 109 | Pollachi | V. P. Chandrasekar | ADK(J) | 41,749 | 37.25 | P. T. Balu | DMK | 37,975 | 33.89 | 3,774 | 3.36 |
| Coimbatore | 110 | Valparai (SC) | P. Lakshmi | ADK(J) | 38,296 | 42.52 | D. M. Shanmugam | DMK | 31,624 | 35.11 | 6,672 | 7.41 |
| Coimbatore | 111 | Udumalpet | S. J. Sadiq Pasha | DMK | 55,089 | 45.21 | P. Kolandaivelu | ADK(J) | 46,684 | 38.32 | 8,405 | 6.89 |
| Coimbatore | 112 | Dharapuram (SC) | T. Santhakumari | DMK | 34,069 | 33.69 | A. Periasamy | ADK(J) | 32,633 | 32.27 | 1,436 | 1.42 |
| Coimbatore | 113 | Vellakoil | Durai Ramasamy | ADK(J) | 41,914 | 37.52 | V. V. Ramasamy | DMK | 36,534 | 32.71 | 5,380 | 4.81 |
| Coimbatore | 114 | Pongalur | S. R. Balasubramoniyam | INC | 31,691 | 32.25 | N. S. Palanisamy | ADK(J) | 31,251 | 31.81 | 440 | 0.44 |
| Coimbatore | 115 | Palladam | M. Kanappan | DMK | 45,395 | 39.12 | K. Sivaraj | ADK(J) | 31,819 | 27.42 | 13,576 | 11.70 |
| Coimbatore | 116 | Tiruppur | C. Govindasamy | CPI(M) | 55,481 | 34.41 | K. Subbarayan | CPI | 38,102 | 23.63 | 17,379 | 10.78 |
| Coimbatore | 117 | Kangayam | P. Marappan | ADK(J) | 43,834 | 40.30 | P. Rathingamy | DMK | 36,163 | 33.25 | 7,671 | 7.05 |
| Erode | 118 | Modakurichi | A. Ganesamoorthy | DMK | 58,058 | 44.27 | S. Balakrishnan | ADK(J) | 42,051 | 32.06 | 16,007 | 12.21 |
| Erode | 119 | Perundurai | V. N. Subramanian | ADK(J) | 39,654 | 34.89 | R. Arumugam | INC | 24,956 | 21.96 | 14,698 | 12.93 |
| Erode | 120 | Erode | Subbulakshmi Jagadesan | DMK | 68,128 | 41.40 | S. Muthusamu | ADK(JA) | 45,930 | 27.91 | 22,198 | 13.49 |
| Erode | 121 | Bhavani | G. G. Gurumoorthy | IND | 36,371 | 42.18 | P. S. Kiruttinasamy | DMK | 19,518 | 22.64 | 16,853 | 19.54 |
| Erode | 122 | Andhiyur (SC) | V. Perisamy | ADK(J) | 26,702 | 37.31 | K. Ramasamy | DMK | 24,740 | 34.57 | 1,962 | 2.74 |
| Erode | 123 | Gobichettipalayam | K. A. Sengottayan | ADK(J) | 37,187 | 38.14 | T. Geetha | JP | 22,943 | 23.53 | 14,244 | 14.61 |
| Erode | 124 | Bhavanisagar | V. K. Chinnasamy | ADK(J) | 39,716 | 37.44 | P. A. Swamynathan | DMK | 32,296 | 30.44 | 7,420 | 7.00 |
| Erode | 125 | Sathyamangalam | T. K. Subramaniam | DMK | 30,535 | 31.66 | S. K. Palanisamy | ADK(J) | 29,448 | 30.53 | 1,087 | 1.13 |
| Nilgiris | 126 | Coonoor (SC) | N. Thangavel | DMK | 40,974 | 42.38 | P. Arumugham | INC | 29,814 | 30.84 | 11,160 | 11.54 |
| Nilgiris | 127 | Ootacamund | H. M. Raju | INC | 35,541 | 36.76 | T. Gundan | DMK | 34,735 | 35.93 | 806 | 0.83 |
| Nilgiris | 128 | Gudalur | M. K. Kareem | INC | 38,147 | 33.61 | T. P. Kamalatchan | CPI(M) | 36,867 | 32.49 | 1,280 | 1.12 |
| Dindigul | 129 | Palani (SC) | N. Palanivel | CPI(M) | 34,379 | 33.21 | B. Panneerselvam | INC | 31,524 | 30.45 | 2,855 | 2.76 |
| Dindigul | 130 | Oddanchatram | P. Kaliappan | DMK | 38,540 | 35.81 | P. Balasubramani | ADK(J) | 32,699 | 30.38 | 5,841 | 5.43 |
| Madurai | 131 | Periyakulam | L. Mookaiah | DMK | 35,215 | 34.15 | S. Sheik Abdul Khadar | INC | 29,622 | 28.73 | 5,593 | 5.42 |
| Madurai | 132 | Theni | G. Ponnu Pillai | DMK | 38,356 | 32.87 | N. R. Alagaraja | INC | 37,576 | 32.20 | 780 | 0.67 |
| Madurai | 133 | Bodinayakkanur | J. Jayalalitha | ADK(J) | 57,603 | 54.41 | Muthu Manoharan | DMK | 28,872 | 27.27 | 28,731 | 27.14 |
| Madurai | 134 | Cumbum | Eramakrishnan | DMK | 52,509 | 46.17 | R. T. Gopalan | ADK(J) | 37,124 | 32.64 | 15,385 | 13.53 |
| Madurai | 135 | Andipatti | P. Asayan | DMK | 31,218 | 29.50 | V. Panneerselvam | ADK(J) | 26,997 | 25.51 | 4,221 | 3.99 |
| Madurai | 136 | Sedapatti | A. Athiyaman | DMK | 29,431 | 31.57 | R. Muthiah | ADK(J) | 22,895 | 24.56 | 6,536 | 7.01 |
| Madurai | 137 | Thirumangalam | R. Saminathan | DMK | 33,433 | 34.84 | N. S. V. Chitthan | INC | 29,378 | 30.61 | 4,055 | 4.23 |
| Madurai | 138 | Usilampatti | P. N. Vallarasu | DMK | 29,116 | 33.74 | V. Pandian | INC | 15,525 | 17.99 | 13,591 | 15.75 |
| Dindigul | 139 | Nilakottai (SC) | A. S. Ponnammal | INC | 29,654 | 30.10 | R. Paranthaman | DMK | 28,962 | 29.39 | 692 | 0.71 |
| Madurai | 140 | Sholavandan | D. Radhakrishnan | DMK | 33,726 | 34.24 | P. S. Manian | ADK(J) | 28,467 | 28.90 | 5,259 | 5.34 |
| Madurai | 141 | Tirupparankundram | C. Ramachandran | DMK | 64,632 | 43.55 | V. Rajan Chellappa | ADK(J) | 34,656 | 23.35 | 29,976 | 20.20 |
| Madurai | 142 | Madurai West | Ponmuthuramalingam | DMK | 45,579 | 44.29 | R. V. S. Premkumar | INC | 26,087 | 25.35 | 19,492 | 18.94 |
| Madurai | 143 | Madurai Central | S. Paulraj | DMK | 33,484 | 39.73 | A. Deivanayagam | INC | 22,338 | 26.50 | 11,146 | 13.23 |
| Madurai | 144 | Madurai East | S. R. Eradha | AIADMK | 40,519 | 48.88 | N. Sankariah | CPI(M) | 27,196 | 32.81 | 13,323 | 16.07 |
| Madurai | 145 | Samayanallur (SC) | N. Soundarapandian | DMK | 53,360 | 38.06 | O. P. Eraman | ADK(J) | 37,410 | 26.68 | 15,950 | 11.38 |
| Madurai | 146 | Melur | K. V. V. Ranamanickam | INC | 41,158 | 36.41 | Kr. Thiagarajan | DMK | 32,508 | 28.75 | 8,650 | 7.66 |
| Dindigul | 147 | Natham | M. Andi Ambalam | INC | 33,019 | 33.21 | R. Visvanathan | ADK(J) | 27,567 | 27.73 | 5,452 | 5.48 |
| Dindigul | 148 | Dindigul | S. A. Thangarajan | CPI(M) | 46,617 | 37.77 | M. Sandhana Mary | INC | 28,815 | 23.34 | 17,802 | 14.43 |
| Dindigul | 149 | Athoor | I. Periasamy | DMK | 37,469 | 32.22 | N. Abdul Kadhar | INC | 33,733 | 29.01 | 3,736 | 3.21 |
| Dindigul | 150 | Vedasandur | P. Muthusamy | ADK(JA) | 37,928 | 29.72 | S. Gandhirajan | IND | 37,038 | 29.02 | 890 | 0.70 |
| Tiruchirapalli | 151 | Aravakurichi | Ramasamy Monjanor | DMK | 48,463 | 42.40 | S. Jagadeesan | ADK(J) | 30,309 | 26.52 | 18,154 | 15.88 |
| Tiruchirapalli | 152 | Karur | K. V. Ramasamy | DMK | 54,163 | 38.34 | M. Chinnasamy | ADK(J) | 49,661 | 35.16 | 4,502 | 3.18 |
| Tiruchirapalli | 153 | Krishnarayapuram (SC) | A. Arivalagan | ADK(J) | 43,574 | 40.57 | S. Masimali | DMK | 32,890 | 30.63 | 10,684 | 9.94 |
| Tiruchirapalli | 154 | Marungapuri | K. Ponnusamy | AIADMK | 55,297 | 49.98 | B. Senguttuvan | DMK | 44,274 | 40.01 | 11,023 | 9.97 |
| Tiruchirapalli | 155 | Kulithalai | A. Papa Sundaram | ADK(J) | 49,231 | 43.02 | A. Sivaraman | DMK | 37,421 | 32.70 | 11,810 | 10.32 |
| Tiruchirapalli | 156 | Thottiam | K. Kannaiyan | DMK | 34,994 | 32.51 | K. P. Kathamuthu | ADK(J) | 33,857 | 31.45 | 1,137 | 1.06 |
| Tiruchirapalli | 157 | Uppiliapuram (ST) | R. Mookkan | ADK(J) | 43,384 | 39.93 | M. Varadarajan | DMK | 38,824 | 35.73 | 4,560 | 4.20 |
| Tiruchirapalli | 158 | Musiri | M. Thangavel | ADK(J) | 49,275 | 39.05 | N. Selvaraju | DMK | 47,826 | 37.90 | 1,449 | 1.15 |
| Tiruchirapalli | 159 | Lalgudi | K. N. Nehru | DMK | 54,275 | 45.95 | Thirunavukkarasu Sami | ADK(J) | 31,087 | 26.32 | 23,188 | 19.63 |
| Tiruchirapalli | 160 | Perambalur (SC) | R. Pitchaimuthu | CPI | 34,829 | 34.51 | M. Devaraj | DMK | 34,398 | 34.09 | 431 | 0.42 |
| Tiruchirapalli | 161 | Varahur (SC) | K. Annadurai | DMK | 36,219 | 43.05 | E. T. Ponnuvelu | ADK(J) | 28,895 | 34.35 | 7,324 | 8.70 |
| Tiruchirapalli | 162 | Ariyalur | T. Arumugam | DMK | 47,353 | 43.60 | P. Elavazhagan | ADK(J) | 29,242 | 26.92 | 18,111 | 16.68 |
| Tiruchirapalli | 163 | Andimadam | S. Sivasubramanian | DMK | 28,500 | 48.01 | A. Elavarasan | ADK(J) | 14,669 | 24.71 | 13,831 | 23.30 |
| Tiruchirapalli | 164 | Jayankondam | K. C. Ganesan | DMK | 22,847 | 31.14 | Muthukumarasamy | IND | 17,980 | 24.51 | 4,867 | 6.63 |
| Tiruchirapalli | 165 | Srirangam | Y. Venkateswara Dikshidar | JP | 42,629 | 35.00 | Ku. Pa. Krishnan | ADK(J) | 34,621 | 28.43 | 8,008 | 6.57 |
| Tiruchirapalli | 166 | Tiruchirapalli-I | A. Malaramannan | DMK | 25,688 | 32.19 | Ka Shivaraj | INC | 19,944 | 24.99 | 5,744 | 7.20 |
| Tiruchirapalli | 167 | Tiruchirapalli-II | Anbil Poyyamozhi | DMK | 40,386 | 39.93 | K. M. Kader Mohideen | IND | 30,593 | 30.25 | 9,793 | 9.68 |
| Tiruchirapalli | 168 | Thiruverambur | Pappa Umanath | CPI(M) | 54,814 | 43.67 | V. Swaminathan | INC | 32,605 | 25.98 | 22,209 | 17.69 |
| Thanjavur | 169 | Sirkali (SC) | M. Panneerselvam | DMK | 36,512 | 40.78 | N. Ramasamy | INC | 13,737 | 15.34 | 22,775 | 25.44 |
| Thanjavur | 170 | Poompuhar | M. Mohamed Siddik | DMK | 40,657 | 47.33 | R. Rajamannar | ADK(J) | 16,839 | 19.60 | 23,818 | 27.73 |
| Thanjavur | 171 | Mayuram | A. Senguttuvan | DMK | 36,793 | 42.73 | M. M. S. Abul Hasan | INC | 24,034 | 27.91 | 12,759 | 14.82 |
| Thanjavur | 172 | Kuttalam | R. Rajamanickam | DMK | 47,559 | 47.57 | S. Dhinakaran | INC | 22,609 | 22.61 | 24,950 | 24.96 |
| Thanjavur | 173 | Nannilam (SC) | M. Manimaran | DMK | 48,605 | 45.08 | A. Kalaiyarasan | ADK(J) | 28,750 | 26.67 | 19,855 | 18.41 |
| Thanjavur | 174 | Tiruvarur (SC) | V. Thambusamy | CPI(M) | 52,520 | 47.75 | Nagooran Raja | ADK(J) | 26,500 | 24.09 | 26,020 | 23.66 |
| Thanjavur | 175 | Nagapattinam | G. Veeraiyan | CPI(M) | 44,681 | 44.70 | Pon Palanivelu | INC | 30,884 | 30.90 | 13,797 | 13.80 |
| Thanjavur | 176 | Vedaranyam | P. V. Rajendiran | INC | 42,060 | 41.82 | M. Meenashisundaram | DMK | 36,836 | 36.62 | 5,224 | 5.20 |
| Thanjavur | 177 | Tiruthuraipundi (SC) | G. Palanisamy | CPI | 49,982 | 43.32 | N. Kuppusamy | DMK | 41,704 | 36.15 | 8,278 | 7.17 |
| Thanjavur | 178 | Mannargudi | K. Ramachandran | DMK | 48,809 | 43.10 | V. Veerasenan | CPI | 46,084 | 40.69 | 2,725 | 2.41 |
| Thanjavur | 179 | Pattukkottai | K. Annadurai | DMK | 41,224 | 37.19 | A. R. Marimuthu | INC | 26,543 | 23.94 | 14,681 | 13.25 |
| Thanjavur | 180 | Peravurani | R. Singaram | INC | 33,467 | 29.59 | M. Krishnamoorthy | DMK | 32,716 | 28.93 | 751 | 0.66 |
| Thanjavur | 181 | Orathanad | L. Ganesan | DMK | 49,554 | 43.16 | K. Srinivasan | ADK(J) | 27,576 | 24.02 | 21,978 | 19.14 |
| Thanjavur | 182 | Thiruvonam | M. Ramachandran | DMK | 42,479 | 37.17 | K. Thangamuthu | ADK(J) | 29,730 | 26.01 | 12,749 | 11.16 |
| Thanjavur | 183 | Thanjavur | S. N. M. Ubayadullah | DMK | 60,380 | 53.83 | Durai Thirugnanam | ADK(J) | 25,527 | 22.76 | 34,853 | 31.07 |
| Thanjavur | 184 | Tiruvaiyaru | Durai Chandraseharan | DMK | 36,981 | 38.28 | V. C. Ganesan | IND | 26,338 | 27.26 | 10,643 | 11.02 |
| Thanjavur | 185 | Papanasam | G. Karuppiah Moopanar | INC | 36,278 | 38.89 | S. Kalyanasundaram | DMK | 35,186 | 37.72 | 1,092 | 1.17 |
| Thanjavur | 186 | Valangiman (SC) | Yasotha Chellappa | DMK | 38,522 | 40.98 | Vivekananda | ADK(J) | 28,624 | 30.45 | 9,898 | 10.53 |
| Thanjavur | 187 | Kumbakonam | K. S. Mani | DMK | 36,763 | 35.03 | K. Krishnamoorthy | INC | 29,071 | 27.70 | 7,692 | 7.33 |
| Thanjavur | 188 | Thiruvidamarudur | S. Ramalingam | DMK | 44,914 | 44.51 | M. Rajangam | INC | 24,857 | 24.64 | 20,057 | 19.87 |
| Pudukottai | 189 | Thirumayam | V. Sobiah | DMK | 32,374 | 30.29 | C. Swaminathan | INC | 26,630 | 24.92 | 5,744 | 5.37 |
| Pudukottai | 190 | Kolathur (SC) | V. Raju | ADK(J) | 47,624 | 39.98 | Selvaraj | DMK | 35,419 | 29.73 | 12,205 | 10.25 |
| Pudukottai | 191 | Pudukkottai | A. Periyannan | DMK | 45,534 | 36.24 | Erama Veerappan | ADK(JA) | 26,254 | 20.89 | 19,280 | 15.35 |
| Pudukottai | 192 | Alangudi | K. B. V. Chandrasekaran | DMK | 37,361 | 29.18 | T. Purhparaju | INC | 33,141 | 25.88 | 4,220 | 3.30 |
| Pudukottai | 193 | Arantangi | S. Thirunavukkarasu | ADK(J) | 61,730 | 47.58 | M. Shanmugasundaram | DMK | 40,027 | 30.85 | 21,703 | 16.73 |
| Sivaganga | 194 | Tiruppattur | S. S. Thennarasu | DMK | 33,639 | 34.41 | R. Arunagiri | INC | 22,746 | 23.27 | 10,893 | 11.14 |
| Sivaganga | 195 | Karaikudi | Rm. Narayanan | DMK | 45,790 | 41.24 | Sp. Durairasu | ADK(JA) | 21,305 | 19.19 | 24,485 | 22.05 |
| Ramanathapuram | 196 | Tiruvadanai | Kr. Eramasamy Ambalam | INC | 38,161 | 35.56 | S. Murugappan | DMK | 36,311 | 33.84 | 1,850 | 1.72 |
| Sivaganga | 197 | Ilayangudi | M. Sathiah | DMK | 41,914 | 45.96 | S. Palanichamy | INC | 22,692 | 24.88 | 19,222 | 21.08 |
| Sivaganga | 198 | Sivaganga | B. Manoharan | DMK | 33,982 | 33.98 | E. M. Sudarsana | INC | 32,214 | 32.22 | 1,768 | 1.76 |
| Sivaganga | 199 | Manamadurai (SC) | P. Duraipandi | DMK | 35,809 | 36.08 | V. M. Subramanian | ADK(J) | 32,357 | 32.60 | 3,452 | 3.48 |
| Ramanathapuram | 200 | Paramakudi (SC) | S. Sundararaj | ADK(J) | 37,494 | 36.53 | K. V. R. Kandasmay | DMK | 34,080 | 33.20 | 3,414 | 3.33 |
| Ramanathapuram | 201 | Ramanathapuram | M. S. K. Rajenthiran | DMK | 38,747 | 36.21 | S. Sekar | ADK(J) | 24,636 | 23.03 | 14,111 | 13.18 |
| Ramanathapuram | 202 | Kadaladi | A. M. Ameeth Ibrahim | DMK | 32,682 | 30.36 | S. Balakrishnan | INC | 32,273 | 29.98 | 409 | 0.38 |
| Ramanathapuram | 203 | Mudukulathur | Kadher Batcha | DMK | 30,787 | 33.14 | P. K. Krishnan | INC | 20,383 | 21.94 | 10,404 | 11.20 |
| Virudunagar | 204 | Aruppukottai | V. Thangapandian | DMK | 44,990 | 45.59 | V. S. Panchavarnam | ADK(J) | 29,467 | 29.86 | 15,523 | 15.73 |
| Virudunagar | 205 | Sattur | S. S. Karuppasamy | DMK | 52,608 | 42.01 | R. Kothanaraman | ADK(J) | 36,546 | 29.18 | 16,062 | 12.83 |
| Virudunagar | 206 | Virudhunagar | R. Chokkar | INC | 34,106 | 32.00 | A. S. A. Arumugam | JP | 28,548 | 26.78 | 5,558 | 5.22 |
| Virudunagar | 207 | Sivakasi | P. Seenivsan | DMK | 41,027 | 31.20 | K. Ayyappan | INC | 35,112 | 26.70 | 5,915 | 4.50 |
| Virudunagar | 208 | Srivilliputhur | A. Thangam | DMK | 45,628 | 38.65 | R. Thamaraikani | ADK(JA) | 32,133 | 27.22 | 13,495 | 11.43 |
| Virudunagar | 209 | Rajapalayam (SC) | V. P. Rajan | DMK | 49,137 | 40.75 | M. Arunachalam | INC | 45,122 | 37.42 | 4,015 | 3.33 |
| Thoothukudi | 210 | Vilathikulam | K. K. S. S. Ramachandran | ADK(J) | 33,951 | 36.59 | S. Kumara Ramanathan | DMK | 25,955 | 27.97 | 7,996 | 8.62 |
| Thoothukudi | 211 | Ottapidaram (SC) | M. Muthiah | DMK | 25,467 | 31.69 | O. S. Veluchami | INC | 23,724 | 29.52 | 1,743 | 2.17 |
| Thoothukudi | 212 | Koilpatti | S. Alagarsomy | CPI | 35,008 | 35.34 | S. Radhakrishnan | DMK | 31,724 | 32.02 | 3,284 | 3.32 |
| Tirunelveli | 213 | Sankaranayanarkoil (SC) | S. Thangavelu | DMK | 46,886 | 43.99 | K. Marutha Karuppan | ADK(J) | 24,897 | 23.36 | 21,989 | 20.63 |
| Tirunelveli | 214 | Vasudevanallur (SC) | R. Eswaran | INC | 30,805 | 32.15 | R. Krishnan | CPI(M) | 30,394 | 31.72 | 411 | 0.43 |
| Tirunelveli | 215 | Kadayanallur | Samsudin Alias Kathiravan | DMK | 37,531 | 36.71 | S. R. Ayyadurai | INC | 30,652 | 29.98 | 6,879 | 6.73 |
| Tirunelveli | 216 | Tenkasi | S. Peter Alphonse | INC | 39,643 | 36.29 | V. Pandivalavan | DMK | 33,049 | 30.25 | 6,594 | 6.04 |
| Tirunelveli | 217 | Alangulam | S. S. Ramasubbbu | INC | 31,314 | 28.57 | M. P. Murugiah | DMK | 30,832 | 28.13 | 482 | 0.44 |
| Tirunelveli | 218 | Tirunelveli | A. L. Subramanian | DMK | 37,991 | 35.55 | N. S. S. Nellai Kannan | INC | 28,470 | 26.64 | 9,521 | 8.91 |
| Tirunelveli | 219 | Palayamcottai | S. Gurunathan | DMK | 34,046 | 34.41 | S. A. Khaja Mohideen | IUML | 31,615 | 31.95 | 2,431 | 2.46 |
| Tirunelveli | 220 | Cheranmahadevi | P. N. Pandian | ADK(JA) | 26,113 | 27.06 | R. Avudaiappan | DMK | 25,413 | 26.34 | 700 | 0.72 |
| Tirunelveli | 221 | Ambasamudram | K. Ravi Arunan | INC | 31,337 | 34.17 | R. Murugiah Pandian | ADK(J) | 27,234 | 29.69 | 4,103 | 4.48 |
| Tirunelveli | 222 | Nanguneri | Achiyur M. Mani | DMK | 30,222 | 31.87 | P. Sironmani | INC | 28,729 | 30.29 | 1,493 | 1.58 |
| Tirunelveli | 223 | Radhapuram | Ramani Nallathambi | INC | 29,432 | 32.19 | V. Karthesan | DMK | 24,930 | 27.27 | 4,502 | 4.92 |
| Thoothukudi | 224 | Sattangulam | Kumari Anathan | INC | 24,913 | 28.65 | P. Durai Raj | DMK | 23,717 | 27.27 | 1,196 | 1.38 |
| Thoothukudi | 225 | Tiruchendur | K. P. Kandasamy | DMK | 42,084 | 42.48 | K. Shunmugasundaram | INC | 24,903 | 25.14 | 17,181 | 17.34 |
| Thoothukudi | 226 | Srivaikuntam | S. Deniel Raj | INC | 29,615 | 34.12 | C. Jegaveerapandian | DMK | 26,143 | 30.12 | 3,472 | 4.00 |
| Thoothukudi | 227 | Tuticorin | N. Periasamy | DMK | 39,688 | 31.90 | V. Shunmugam | INC | 39,141 | 31.46 | 547 | 0.44 |
| Kanyakumari | 228 | Kanniyakumari | K. Subramonia Pillai | DMK | 33,376 | 34.65 | V. Aurmugham Pillai | INC | 31,037 | 32.22 | 2,339 | 2.43 |
| Kanyakumari | 229 | Nagercoil | M. Moses | INC | 35,647 | 34.48 | P. Dharmaraj | DMK | 28,782 | 27.84 | 6,865 | 6.64 |
| Kanyakumari | 230 | Colachel | A. Pauliah | INC | 36,611 | 39.19 | R. Sambath Chandra | DMK | 24,414 | 26.13 | 12,197 | 13.06 |
| Kanyakumari | 231 | Padmanabhapuram | S. Noor Mohmed | CPI(M) | 21,489 | 27.24 | A. T. C. Joseph | INC | 20,175 | 25.57 | 1,314 | 1.67 |
| Kanyakumari | 232 | Thiruvattar | R. Nadesan | INC | 39,193 | 45.37 | J. Hemachandran | CPI(M) | 31,084 | 35.98 | 8,109 | 9.39 |
| Kanyakumari | 233 | Vilavancode | M. Sundaradas | INC | 41,168 | 42.25 | D. Mony | CPI(M) | 39,954 | 41.00 | 1,214 | 1.25 |
| Kanyakumari | 234 | Killiyoor | Pon Vijayaraghavan | IND | 30,127 | 39.53 | A. Jeyaraj | DMK | 20,296 | 26.63 | 9,831 | 12.90 |

== Analysis ==
The split in the AIADMK and the Congress contesting alone split the opposition votes, while the DMK retained its vote bank and won a comfortable majority. VN Janaki, contesting from Andipatti, lost to DMK's P. Asayan by less than a 5000 vote margin, in a four-way contest between AIADMK (Janaki), AIADMK (Jayalalithaa), Congress, and DMK.

== Aftermath ==
After this election, T. N. Seshan led Election Commission of India stopped giving out new animals or birds as official election symbols, due to the incidents involving roosters and doves used as party symbols were reportedly subjected to cruelty during campaign activities.

== Cabinet ==
| S.no | Name | Designation | Party |
|---|---|---|---|
Chief Minister
| 1. | M. Karunanidhi | Chief Minister | DMK |
Cabinet Ministers
| 2. | K. Anbazhagan | Minister for Education | DMK |
| 3. | S. J. Sadiq Pasha | Minister for Law | DMK |
| 4. | Nanjil K. Manoharan | Minister for Revenue | DMK |
| 5. | M. Kannappan | Minister for Transport | DMK |
| 6. | K. P. Kandasamy | Minister for Hindu Religious and Charitable Endowments | DMK |
| 7. | Ko. Si. Mani | Minister for Rural Development and Local Administration | DMK |
| 8. | Pon. Muthuramalingam | Minister for Food and Co-operation | DMK |
| 9. | Veerapandy S. Arumugam | Minister for Agriculture | DMK |
| 10. | Durai Murugan | Minister for Public Works | DMK |
| 11. | Subbulakshmi Jagadeesan | Minister for Social Welfare and Rural Industries | DMK |
| 12. | K. Ponmudy | Minister for Public Health | DMK |
| 13. | K. N. Nehru | Minister for Information and Labour | DMK |
| 14. | S. Thangavelu | Minister for Handlooms and Urban Development | DMK |
| 15. | K. Chandrasekaran | Minister for Animal Husbandry | DMK |
| 16. | K. Sundaram | Minister for Adi Dravidar Welfare | DMK |

== See also ==
- Elections in Tamil Nadu
- Legislature of Tamil Nadu
- Government of Tamil Nadu
- 1989 Tamil Nadu state assembly election
- S. Krishnamoorthy
- Dravida Munnetra Kazhagam
