= K. Kandasamy (Andipatti) =

Indian politician (born 1932)

Member of the Tamil Nadu Legislative Assembly
- In office 1977–1980
- Preceded by: N. V. Gurusamy
- Succeeded by: S. S. Rajendran
- Constituency: Andipatti

Personal details
- Born: 9 March 1932
- Party: All India Anna Dravida Munnetra Kazhagam
- Education: Madura College, Madurai, Madras Law College, Chennai
- Profession: Lawyer

K. Kandasamy (born 9 March 1932) is an Indian politician who was a former Member of the Legislative Assembly of Tamil Nadu. He was elected to the 6th Tamil Nadu Legislative Assembly from the Andipatti constituency as an Anna Dravida Munnetra Kazhagam candidate in the 1977 election.

== Electoral performance ==
1977 Tamil Nadu Legislative Assembly election : Andipatti
Party	Candidate	Votes	%	±%
AIADMK	K. Kandasamy	24,311	34.41%	New
JP	N. V. Gurusamy	16,269	23.03%	New
DMK	A. Vetriventhan	15,814	22.38%	New
CPI	D. Pandian	14,255	20.18%	New
Margin of victory		8,042	11.38%	▲4.16
Turnout		71,743	62.19%	▼0.94
Total valid votes		70,649		
Rejected ballots		1,094	1.52%	▲1.52
Registered electors		115,363		▲15.76
AIADMK gain from SWA		Swing	▼1.96	
