= K. Thavasi =

Indian politician

Member of the Tamil Nadu Legislative Assembly
- In office 1991–1996
- Constituency: Andipatti

Personal details
- Party: All India Anna Dravida Munnetra Kazhagam

K. Thavasi was an Indian politician and former Member of the Legislative Assembly of Tamil Nadu. He was elected to the Tamil Nadu legislative assembly as an Anna Dravida Munnetra Kazhagam candidate from Andipatti constituency in 1991 election.

== Electoral performance ==
Election	Constituency	Political party	Result	Vote %	Opposition			Ref
Election	Constituency	Political party	Result	Vote %	Candidate	Political party	Vote %	Ref
1991	Andipatti	AIADMK	Won	64.25%	P. Aasiyan	DMK	23.17%	
