= A. Krishnaveni =

Indian politician

Member of the Madras State Legislative Assembly
- In office 1962–1967
- Constituency: Andipatti

Personal details
- Party: Indian National Congress

K. Krishnaveni is an Indian politician and former Member of the Legislative Assembly of Tamil Nadu. She was elected to the Tamil Nadu legislative assembly as an Indian National Congress candidate from Andipatti constituency in 1962 election.

== Electoral performance ==
Election	Constituency	Political party	Result	Vote %	Opposition			Ref
Election	Constituency	Political party	Result	Vote %	Candidate	Political party	Vote %	Ref
1962	Andipatti	INC	Won	45.68%	T. Mokkayan	AIFB	37.91%	
