= List of educational institutions in Virudhunagar district =

This is a list of the Schools and colleges in Virudhunagar district.

== Schools ==
- V.M.G.Rajasekaran-Ramani Sri Sarada Sakthi Matric Higher Secondary School
- Kshathriya Vidyasala Higher Secondary School
- Tiruvalluvar Vidyalaya Middle School
- Kshathriya Vidyasala Middle School
- P.S.Chidambara Nadar Matric Hr. Sec. School
- K.V.S English Medium School
- K.V.S Matric Higher Secondary School
- Kshathriya Girls Higher Secondary School
- K.V.S Centenary school
- Lions School
- S.F.S Matric Higher secondary school School
- Subbiah Nadar Govt. Hr. Sec. School
- Minerva Public School Aruppukottai
- South Street Hindu Nadar Higher Secondary School
- S.B.K. School

== Engineering Colleges ==
- Kamaraj College of Engineering and Technology, Virudhunagar
- Mepco Schlenk Engineering College, Sivakasi, Virudhunagar
- A.A.A College of Engineering and Technology, Virudhunagar
- Sri Vidya College of Engineering, Virudhunagar
- Renganayagi Varatharaj College of Engineering, Sivakasi, Virudhunagar
- PSRR Engineering College for women, Sivakasi, Virudhunagar
- Arulmigu Kalasalingam university, Krishnankoil, Virudhunagar
- Sethu Institute of Technology, Kariapatti, Virudhunagar
- Ramco Institute of Technology, Rajapalayam, Virudhunagar

== Arts & Science Colleges ==
- Virudhunagar Hindu Nadars' Senthikumara Nadar College, Virudhunagar
- Kaliswari College, Virudhunagar
- Noble College for Women, Virudhunagar
- Sri Vidya Arts & Science College, Virudhunagar
- S.B.K College, Arupukottai
- Sai Ram Arts & Science college, Arupukottai
