= Nakkheeran =

Tamil-language publication

- Editor: Nakkeeran Gopal
- Categories: News, politics
- Frequency: Weekly
- Publisher: Nakkheeran Publications
- Founded: 1988
- First issue: 20 April 1988
- Country: India
- Language: Tamil
- Website: nakkheeran.in

Nakkheeran is a Tamil language biweekly magazine published in Chennai. Nakkheeran Gopal is the founder and editor of the magazine. It was established in 1988 and the first issue came out on 20 April 1988. The magazine is known for its investigative journalism.

== Publications group ==
The magazine is part of Nakkheeran Publications, which also publishes Balajothidam, OMM Saravanabava, Iniya Udhayam and Pothu Arivu Ulagam magazines.
