= Andipatti Assembly constituency =

One of the 234 State Legislative Assembly Constituencies in Tamil Nadu, in India

Coordinates: 10°00′N 77°37′E

Andipatti
- Constituency No. 198 for the Tamil Nadu Legislative Assembly

Constituency details
- Country: India
- Region: South India
- State: Tamil Nadu
- District: Theni
- Lok Sabha constituency: Theni
- Established: 1962
- Total electors: 256,529

Member of Legislative Assembly
- 17th Tamil Nadu Legislative Assembly
- Incumbent A. Maharajan
- Party: DMK
- Elected year: 2026

Andipatti is a constituency in the Tamil Nadu legislative assembly, that includes the city of Andipatti. It is a part of Theni Lok Sabha constituency. It is one of the 234 State Legislative Assembly Constituencies in Tamil Nadu, in India.

== Members of the Legislative Assembly ==
Election	Member	Party
1962	A. Krishnaveni	Indian National Congress
1967	S. Paramasivam	Swatantra Party
1971	N. V. Gurusamy Naidu	Swatantra Party
1977	K. Kandasamy	All India Anna Dravida Munnetra Kazhagam
1980	S. S. Rajendran	All India Anna Dravida Munnetra Kazhagam
1984	M. G. Ramachandran	All India Anna Dravida Munnetra Kazhagam
1989	P. Aasiyan	Dravida Munnetra Kazhagam
1991	K. Thavasi	All India Anna Dravida Munnetra Kazhagam
1996	P. Aasiyan	Dravida Munnetra Kazhagam
2001	Thanga Tamil Selvan	All India Anna Dravida Munnetra Kazhagam
2002^	J. Jayalalithaa	All India Anna Dravida Munnetra Kazhagam
2006	J. Jayalalithaa	All India Anna Dravida Munnetra Kazhagam
2011	Thanga Tamil Selvan	All India Anna Dravida Munnetra Kazhagam
2016	Thanga Tamil Selvan	All India Anna Dravida Munnetra Kazhagam
2019^	A. Maharajan	Dravida Munnetra Kazhagam
2021	A. Maharajan	Dravida Munnetra Kazhagam
2026	A. Maharajan	Dravida Munnetra Kazhagam

Madras State

== Election results ==
=== Assembly election 2026 ===
2026 Tamil Nadu Legislative Assembly election : Andipatti
Party	Candidate	Votes	%	±%
DMK	A. Maharajan	74,324	34.20%	▼10.73
TVK	Pandi. V	64,770	29.80%	New
AIADMK	A. Logirajan	63,343	29.15%	New
NTK	Gomathi .M	10,346	4.76%	▼0.63
NOTA	None of the above	1,028	0.47%	▼0.17
Margin of victory		9,554	4.40%	▲0.30
Turnout		217,699	84.38%	▲8.98
Total valid votes		217,329		
Registered electors		257,997		▼7.31
DMK hold		Swing		

=== Assembly election 2021 ===
2021 Tamil Nadu Legislative Assembly election : Andipatti
Party	Candidate	Votes	%	±%
DMK	A. Maharajan	93,541	44.93%	▲1.20
AIADMK	A. Logirajan	85,003	40.83%	▲3.29
AMMK	R. Jeyakumar	11,896	5.71%	New
NTK	A. Jeyakumar	11,216	5.39%	▲2.79
MNM	S. Gunasekaran	3,010	1.45%	New
NOTA	None of the above	1,333	0.64%	▼0.47
Margin of victory		8,538	4.10%	▼2.09
Turnout		209,872	75.40%	▼0.93
Total valid votes		208,207		
Rejected ballots		332	0.16%	▲0.16
Registered electors		278,344		▲5.23
DMK hold		Swing		

=== Assembly by-election 2019 ===
2019 Tamil Nadu Legislative Assembly by-election : Andipatti
Party	Candidate	Votes	%	±%
DMK	A. Maharajan	87,079	43.73%	▲7.01
AIADMK	A. Logirajan	74,756	37.54%	▼14.39
Independent	R. Jeyakumar	28,313	14.22%	
NTK	Arunadevi. R	5,180	2.60%	▲1.94
Independent	Alagarsamy. G	2,408	1.21%	
NOTA	None of the above	2,212	1.11%	▲0.15
Margin of victory		12,323	6.19%	▼9.01
Turnout		201,902	76.33%	▼1.97
Total valid votes		199,132		
Registered electors		264,521		▲4.21
DMK gain from AIADMK		Swing	▼8.20	

=== Assembly election 2016 ===
2016 Tamil Nadu Legislative Assembly election : Andipatti
Party	Candidate	Votes	%	±%
AIADMK	Thanga Tamil Selvan	103,129	51.93%	▼1.82
DMK	L. Mookiah	72,933	36.72%	▼4.70
DMDK	M. N. Krishnamoorthy	10,776	5.43%	New
BJP	R. Chakkaravarthi	3,465	1.74%	▲0.77
NOTA	None of the above	1,909	0.96%	New
NTK	M. Anandha Babu	1,318	0.66%	New
Independent	S. Vaigai Sekar @ Balasundaram	1,226	0.62%	
Margin of victory		30,196	15.20%	▲2.88
Turnout		198,757	78.30%	▼3.44
Total valid votes		198,609		
Rejected ballots		148	0.07%	▼0.09
Registered electors		253,826		▲21.39
AIADMK hold		Swing		

=== Assembly election 2011 ===
2011 Tamil Nadu Legislative Assembly election : Andipatti
Party	Candidate	Votes	%	±%
AIADMK	Thanga Tamil Selvan	91,721	53.75%	▼1.29
DMK	L. Mookiah	70,690	41.42%	▲5.13
BJP	R. Kumar	1,660	0.97%	
Margin of victory		21,031	12.32%	▼6.43
Turnout		170,926	81.74%	▲8.59
Total valid votes		170,652		
Rejected ballots		274	0.16%	▲0.16
Registered electors		209,097		▲13.88
AIADMK hold		Swing		

=== Assembly election 2006 ===
2006 Tamil Nadu Legislative Assembly election : Andipatti
Party	Candidate	Votes	%	±%
AIADMK	J. Jayalalithaa	73,927	55.04%	▼3.18
DMK	Seeman	48,741	36.29%	▲8.65
DMDK	V. S. Chandran	6,795	5.06%	New
BJP	M. Santhakumar	1,298	0.97%	New
BSP	P. Balasundararaj	1,154	0.86%	New
Margin of victory		25,186	18.75%	▼11.83
Turnout		134,307	73.15%	▲8.55
Total valid votes		134,304		
Registered electors		183,610		▼11.97
AIADMK hold		Swing		

=== Assembly by-election 2002 ===
2002 Tamil Nadu Legislative Assembly by-election : Andipatti
Party	Candidate	Votes	%	±%
AIADMK	J. Jayalalithaa	78,437	58.22%	New
DMK	Vaigai Sekar Alias Balasundaram. S	37,236	27.64%	▼4.03
MDMK	Jeyachandran. V	8,421	6.25%	▼5.94
PT	Dr. Krishnasamy,. K	5,126	3.80%	New
Independent	Paulraj,. R	894	0.66%	
Independent	Periya Subbian,. P	860	0.64%	
Margin of victory		41,201	30.58%	▲8.46
Turnout		134,744	64.60%	▲5.50
Total valid votes		134,734		
Registered electors		208,576		▲8.94
AIADMK gain from AIADMK		Swing	▲4.44	

=== Assembly election 2001 ===
2001 Tamil Nadu Legislative Assembly election : Andipatti
Party	Candidate	Votes	%	±%
AIADMK	Thanga Tamil Selvan	60,817	53.78%	▲21.01
DMK	P. Aasiyan	35,808	31.67%	▼13.23
MDMK	T. R. M. Varatharajan	13,783	12.19%	▼3.32
Independent	S. Jayarasu	1,048	0.93%	
Margin of victory		25,009	22.12%	▲10.00
Turnout		113,150	59.10%	▼7.47
Total valid votes		113,080		
Rejected ballots		70	0.06%	▼3.50
Registered electors		191,451		▲8.89
AIADMK gain from DMK		Swing	▲8.88	

=== Assembly election 1996 ===
1996 Tamil Nadu Legislative Assembly election : Andipatti
Party	Candidate	Votes	%	±%
DMK	P. Aasiyan	50,736	44.90%	▲21.73
AIADMK	A. Muthiah	37,035	32.77%	New
MDMK	Sekar @ Balasundaram	17,521	15.51%	New
PMK	Vadivelravanan	5,299	4.69%	▼5.16
BJP	R. Ganesan	1,618	1.43%	▼0.81
Margin of victory		13,701	12.12%	▼28.96
Turnout		117,038	66.57%	▲5.58
Total valid votes		113,000		
Rejected ballots		4,166	3.56%	▲1.31
Registered electors		175,815		▲1.86
DMK gain from AIADMK		Swing	▼19.35	

=== Assembly election 1991 ===
1991 Tamil Nadu Legislative Assembly election : Andipatti
Party	Candidate	Votes	%	±%
AIADMK	K. Thavasi	66,110	64.25%	New
DMK	P. Aasiyan	23,843	23.17%	▼6.33
PMK	R. Ammal Gomathi	10,133	9.85%	New
BJP	A. Mohammed	2,302	2.24%	New
Margin of victory		42,267	41.08%	▲37.09
Turnout		105,268	60.99%	▼9.92
Total valid votes		102,897		
Rejected ballots		2,371	2.25%	▲0.29
Registered electors		172,603		▲13.37
AIADMK gain from DMK		Swing	▲34.75	

=== Assembly election 1989 ===
1989 Tamil Nadu Legislative Assembly election : Andipatti
Party	Candidate	Votes	%	±%
DMK	P. Aasiyan	31,218	29.50%	▼1.72
AIADMK	V. Panneerselvam	26,997	25.51%	New
AIADMK	V. N. Janaki	22,647	21.40%	New
INC	K. Velusamy	21,782	20.58%	New
Independent	K. P. Rajappan	1,890	1.79%	
Margin of victory		4,221	3.99%	▼32.19
Turnout		107,953	70.91%	▲0.93
Total valid votes		105,835		
Rejected ballots		2,118	1.96%	▼1.66
Registered electors		152,247		▲14.37
DMK gain from AIADMK		Swing	▼37.90	

=== Assembly election 1984 ===
1984 Tamil Nadu Legislative Assembly election : Andipatti
Party	Candidate	Votes	%	±%
AIADMK	M. G. Ramachandran	60,510	67.40%	▲7.61
DMK	P. N. Vallarasu	28,026	31.22%	New
Margin of victory		32,484	36.18%	▼1.42
Turnout		93,155	69.98%	▲10.49
Total valid votes		89,781		
Rejected ballots		3,374	3.62%	▲2.12
Registered electors		133,117		▲4.83
AIADMK hold		Swing		

=== Assembly election 1980 ===
1980 Tamil Nadu Legislative Assembly election : Andipatti
Party	Candidate	Votes	%	±%
AIADMK	S. S. Rajendran	44,490	59.79%	New
INC	K. Kandasamy	16,508	22.18%	New
JP	N. V. Gurusamy	9,889	13.29%	New
Independent	A. Vetriventhan	3,073	4.13%	
Independent	S. Muthusamy	455	0.61%	
Margin of victory		27,982	37.60%	▲26.22
Turnout		75,545	59.49%	▼2.70
Total valid votes		74,415		
Rejected ballots		1,130	1.50%	▼0.02
Registered electors		126,984		▲10.07
AIADMK gain from AIADMK		Swing	▲25.38	

=== Assembly election 1977 ===
1977 Tamil Nadu Legislative Assembly election : Andipatti
Party	Candidate	Votes	%	±%
AIADMK	K. Kandasamy	24,311	34.41%	New
JP	N. V. Gurusamy	16,269	23.03%	New
DMK	A. Vetriventhan	15,814	22.38%	New
CPI	D. Pandian	14,255	20.18%	New
Margin of victory		8,042	11.38%	▲4.16
Turnout		71,743	62.19%	▼0.94
Total valid votes		70,649		
Rejected ballots		1,094	1.52%	▲1.52
Registered electors		115,363		▲15.76
AIADMK gain from SWA		Swing	▼1.96	

=== Assembly election 1971 ===
1971 Tamil Nadu Legislative Assembly election : Andipatti
Party	Candidate	Votes	%	±%
SWA	N. V. Gurusamy Naidu	20,814	36.37%	▼18.49
AIFB	S. Paramasivam	16,682	29.15%	New
Independent	K. V. Veluchamy Naicker	15,469	27.03%	
Independent	T. Das Muthu Gounder	4,260	7.44%	
Margin of victory		4,132	7.22%	▼2.49
Turnout		62,910	63.13%	▼10.99
Total valid votes		57,225		
Registered electors		99,654		▲11.19
SWA hold		Swing		

=== Assembly election 1967 ===
1967 Madras State Legislative Assembly election : Andipatti
Party	Candidate	Votes	%	±%
SWA	S. Paramasivam	35,351	54.86%	New
INC	A. Thiruvenkidasamy	29,091	45.14%	▼0.54
Margin of victory		6,260	9.71%	▲1.94
Turnout		66,428	74.12%	▲23.35
Total valid votes		64,442		
Registered electors		89,623		▼0.87
SWA gain from INC		Swing	▲9.18	

=== Assembly election 1962 ===
1962 Madras State Legislative Assembly election : Andipatti
Party	Candidate	Votes	%	±%
INC	A. Krishnaveni	19,853	45.68%	New
AIFB	T. Mokkayan	16,478	37.91%	New
Independent	P. Selvaraju	5,201	11.97%	New
Independent	A. Kulandaivelu	1,929	4.44%	New
Margin of victory		3,375	7.77%	
Turnout		45,902	50.77%	
Total valid votes		43,461		
Registered electors		90,409		
INC win (new seat)				
