= Devanga Arts College =

College in Tamil Nadu, India

- Type: Public
- Established: 1970
- Affiliations: Madurai Kamaraj University NAAC A Grade
- Principal: Dr. T. ESAKKI DURAI
- Students: 2255
- Location: Aruppukottai, Virudhunagar district, Tamil Nadu, 626101, India; 9.5057705°N 78.1050552°E
- Campus: Urban
- Website: https://dac.ac.in/

Devanga Arts College, is a general degree college located in Aruppukottai, Virudhunagar district, Tamil Nadu. The college is affiliated with Madurai Kamaraj University. This college offers different courses in arts, commerce and science.

== Accreditation ==
The college is recognized by the University Grants Commission (UGC).

== Controversy ==
Devanga Arts College's assistant professor got caught in an alleged scandal where she tried to lure four female students for prostitution. College authorities suspended the assistant professor after the girls filed a complaint. College authorities said Ms. P. Nirmala Devi was suspended on 21 March, two days after the four final years B.Sc. students filed a written complaint. However, no police complaint has been filed by the college in this matter.

== See also ==
- Education in India
- Literacy in India
- List of educational institutions in Virudhunagar district
- List of institutions of higher education in Tamil Nadu
