= A. Maharajan =

Indian politician

Andipatti Maharajan is an Indian politician and is Member of the Legislative Assembly of Tamil Nadu. He was elected to the Tamil Nadu legislative assembly as a Dravida Munnetra Kazhagam candidate from Andipatti Constituency in the by-election in 2019.

== Electoral performance ==
Election	Constituency	Political party	Result	Vote %	Opposition			Ref
Election	Constituency	Political party	Result	Vote %	Candidate	Political party	Vote %	Ref
2019 by-election	Andipatti	DMK	Won	43.73%	A. Logirajan	AIADMK	37.54%	
2021	Andipatti	DMK	Won	44.93%	A. Logirajan	AIADMK	40.83%	-
2026	Andipatti	DMK	Won	34.20%	Pandi. V	TVK	29.80%	-
