= Ramco Institute of Technology =

Engineering college in Tamil Nadu, India

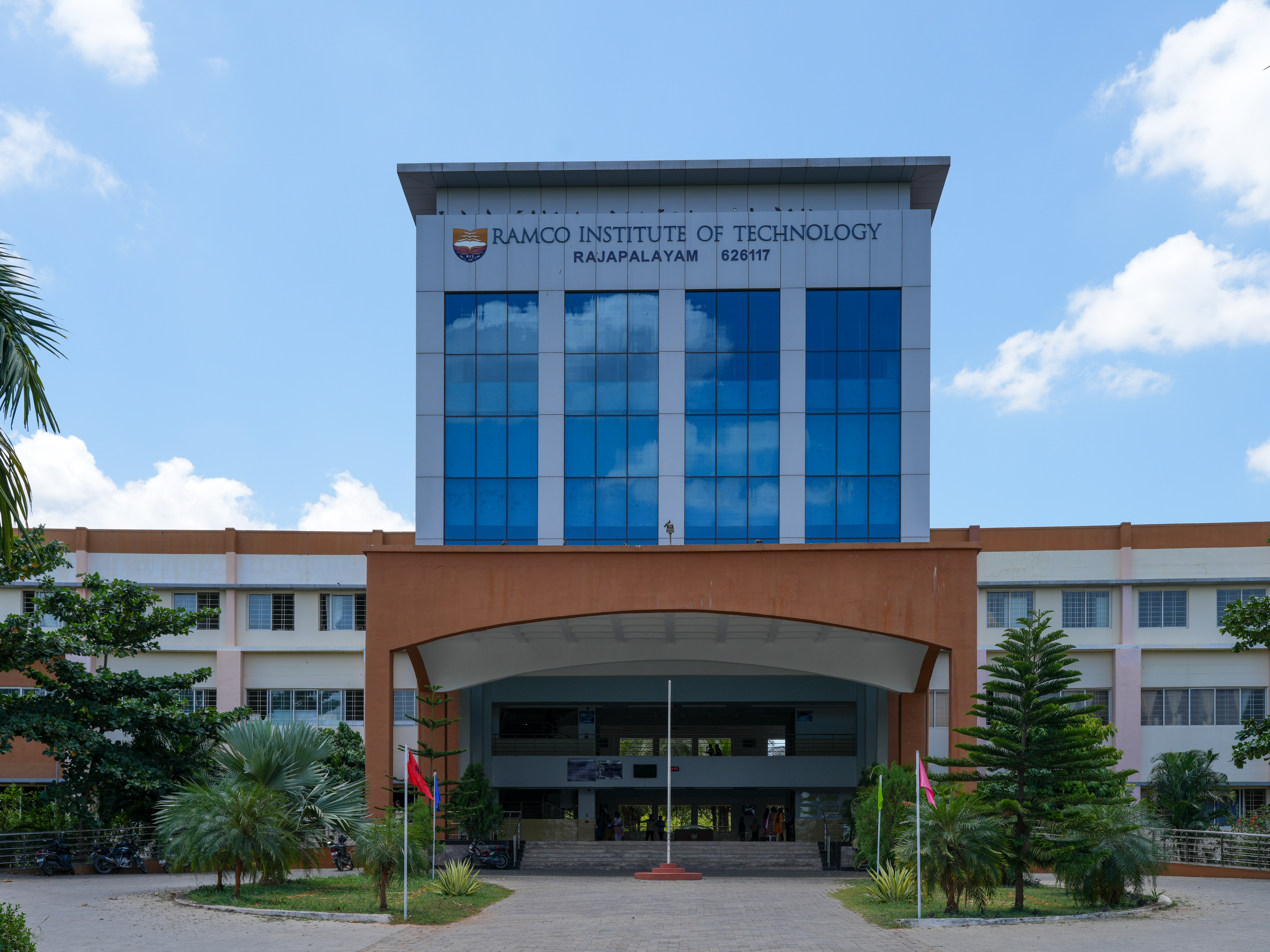
- Main building
- Other names: RIT
- Type: Affiliated
- Established: 2013; 13 years ago
- Accreditation: NAAC A+ in 2024
- Academic affiliations: Anna University, Chennai
- Principal: Dr. L. Ganesan
- Location: North Venganallur village, Rajapalayam, Tamil Nadu, India; 9.48280°N 77.51434°E
- Campus: 9.3 ha (23 acres)
- Language: English
- Approvals: AICTE
- Website: www.ritrjpm.ac.in

Ramco Institute of Technology (RIT), is an Engineering college in Rajapalayam, approved by AICTE and affiliated to Anna University, Chennai. Promoted by the Raja Charity Trust, the college started functioning in 2013-14. The college is nationally accredited by NAAC, India. It has students from the state of Tamil Nadu, with a few from other parts of India.

== History ==
In 1950, the Ramco Group of industries started its first school. Since then, the group has established 20 educational institutions which have catered to over 1,00,000 students. One of these institutions, the Ramco Institute of Technology was founded in 2013 by the Raja Charity Trust. The vision was to provide high-quality, affordable, world-class education to aspiring engineers. In 2019, RIT was accredited by the National Assessment and Accreditation Council of India and by the National Board of Accreditation of India in 2020.

== Governance ==
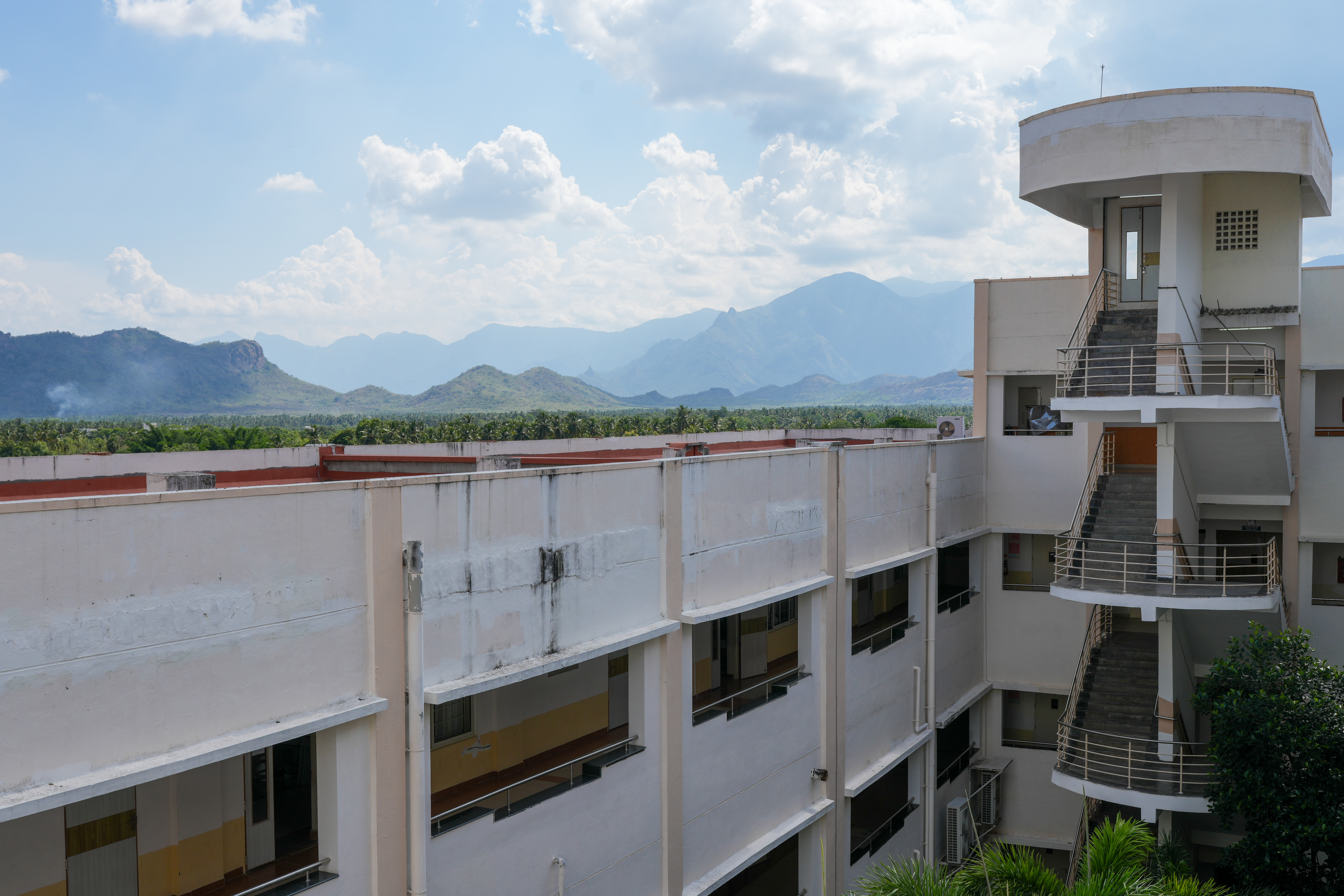
Courtyard in Academic Block

RIT is run by the Raja Charity Trust. The institute has the following five departments:

- Civil Engineering
- Computer Science & Engineering
- Electrical & Electronics Engineering
- Electronics & Communications Engineering
- Mechanical Engineering
- Computer Science and Business Systems

== Academics ==
The institute offers nine Bachelor of Technology (B.Tech.) degree programmes, with a sanctioned intake of 720 students in 2025-26:

- Artificial Intelligence & Data Science
- Civil Engineering
- Computer Science & Business Systems
- Computer Science & Engineering
- Computer Science and Engineering (Artificial Intelligence and Machine Learning)
- Electrical & Electronics Engineering
- Electronics & Communications Engineering
- Information Technology
- Mechanical Engineering

=== Admissions ===
Students are admitted in two modes. 65% of the seats are filled from the Tamil Nadu Engineering Admissions (TNAE) single-window system based on the candidate's rank in a state-wide entrance test. The remaining 35% are filled by the college management according to their own criteria. In 2025, the college had 2024 students. Of these, 2016 were from the state of Tamil Nadu and 8 from other states in India. Female students constituted 36.6%.

=== Accreditation and ranking ===
RIT is approved by the All India Council for Technical Education, India and is affiliated to Anna University, Tamil Nadu. The college is accredited by the National Assessment and Accreditation Council (NAAC), India, receiving a grade of B++ in 2019 and A+ in 2024. In 2024, RIT was ranked 10th out of 310 affiliated colleges by Anna University, based on academic performance. The National Board of Accreditation (NBA) of India accredited the undergraduate programmes in Computer Science & Engineering, Electrical & Electronics Engineering, Electronics & Communication Engineering and Mechanical Engineering in 2021-22 and renewed the accreditation up to 30 June 2027. The programme in Civil Engineering was accredited from 1 January 2026 to 31 December 2028.

== Events ==
The faculty of RIT organise conferences and workshops for participants from other institutions. Some recent events:

- February 2024: a 3-day "International Conference on Artificial Intelligence, Cybersecurity, and Game Design (ICAICGD 2024)", organised jointly with Ball State University, Indiana, United States. Conference proceedings published by Springer Nature.
- March 2025: a 2-day programme titled "Collaborative Innovation: How Multidisciplinary Research is Shaping the Future" was conducted. About 100 participants from colleges and universities attended.
- May 2025: a 2-day programme "Augment your imagination: build your AR World”, attended by 50 school students.
- January 2026: a 5-day national-level training for technical staff, entitled "Empower 360: Skill enhancement for technical staff".

In 2018, RIT organised the Ramco Institute of Technology International FIDE Rated Chess Tournament on its campus. The tournament was won by M. Kunal, who was an International Master elect at that time. The 310 competitors stayed on the campus during the tournament.

== Campus amenities ==
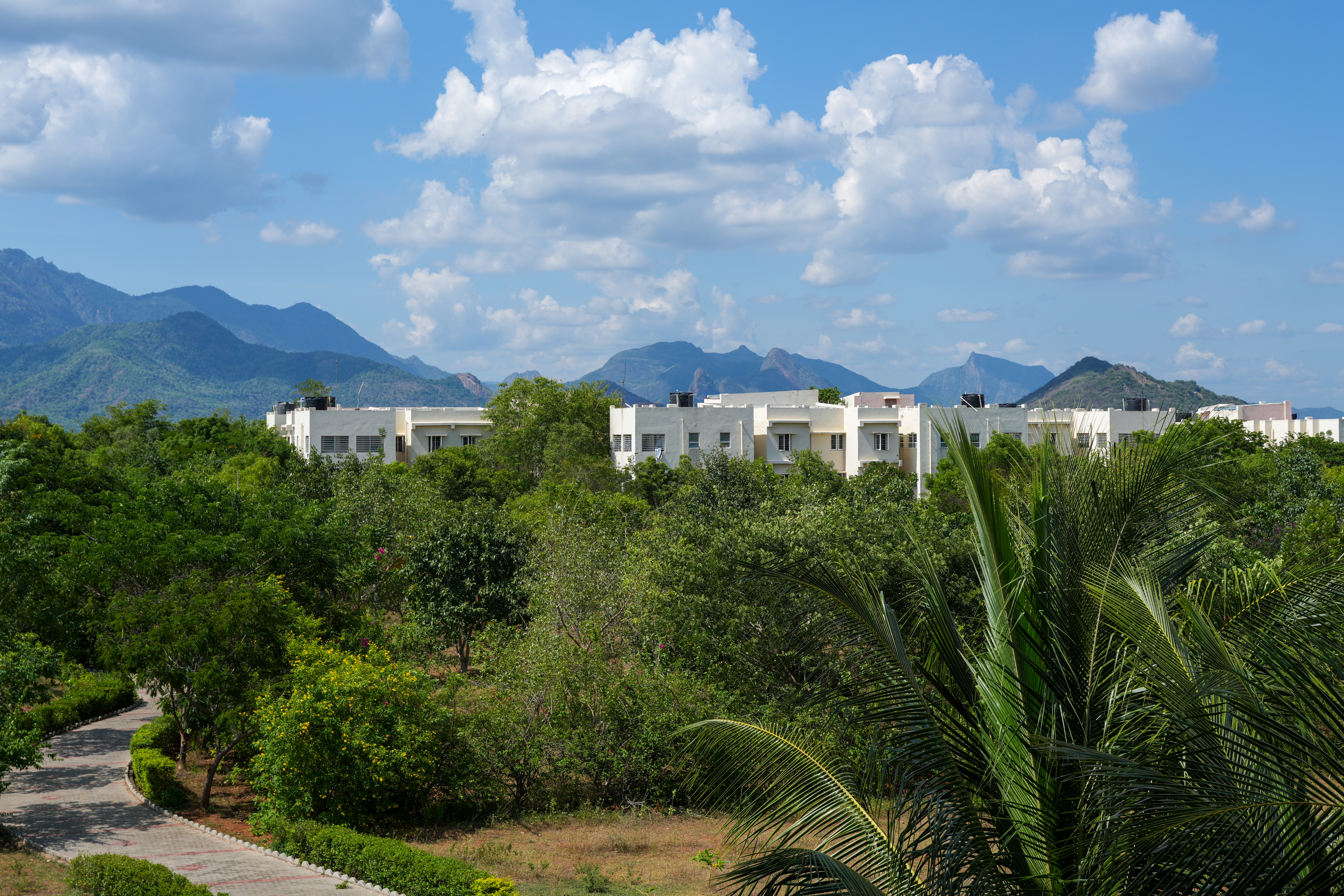
Hostels, with footpath winding through woods

Besides labs and classrooms, the campus has a 3,000-seat auditorium. Sports facilities cater to indoor and outdoor events. Hostels provide on-campus accommodation for both female and male students.

== Student clubs ==
RIT has a number of student clubs including Fine Arts and Cultural Club, Sports Club, ISTE Chapter, Photography Club, etc. Each of the 5 Departments has a Department Technical Association. Students organise regional and national events. Some recent national-level events include:

- VIDYANTRA ’26, a technical fest, 21 February 2026
- Project Pulse 2025, a project competition in association with Maasr Consulting, UK, 29 October 2025
