= P. Aasiyan =

Indian politician

P. Aasiyan (born 1957) was an Indian politician and former Member of the Legislative Assembly of Tamil Nadu. He was elected to the Tamil Nadu legislative assembly as a Dravida Munnetra Kazhagam candidate from Andipatti constituency in 1989 and 1996 elections.
