= S. Paramasivam =

Indian politician

S. Paramasivam was an Indian politician and former Member of the Legislative Assembly of Tamil Nadu. He was elected to the Tamil Nadu legislative assembly as a Swatantra Party candidate from Andipatti constituency in 1967 election.
