= S. Paramasivan =

Indian chemist (1903 - 1987)

- Paramasivan in 1929
- Born: 1903 near Thanjavur
- Died: 15 May 1987 (aged 83–84)
- Scientific career
- Fields: Chemistry
- Thesis: Chemical investigation of Ancient Indian Materials and Industries (1940)

Subramanya Aiyar Paramasivan (1903 – 15 May 1987) was an Indian chemist who served at the Madras Museum and at the Archaeological Survey of India as an archaeological chemist and was a pioneer of electrolytic restoration of bronze artefacts and chemical conservation techniques. He studied ancient painting techniques, metallurgy, and investigated some applications of nuclear physics in archaeology.

== Life and work ==
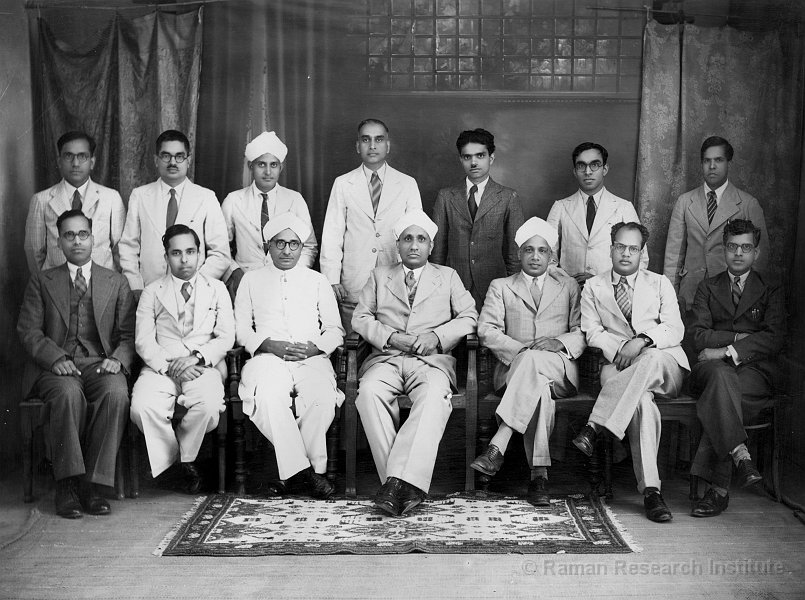
Paramasivan standing third from left with Sir C. V. Raman and others, c. 1929

Paramasivan was born near Thanjavur and was the son of R. Subramanya Aiyar. He went to school in Madras and received a BA in physics from St. Joseph's College, Tiruchirappalli apart from a BSc in chemistry from Nizam's College, Hyderabad. He then taught at a college in Madanapalli and still later in Sri Lanka. He returned to Madras University to pursue a master's degree in chemistry. He then spent some time at the IACS in Calcutta working with Sir C.V. Raman on chemical problems. In 1930, the Government Museum in Madras headed by F. H. Gravely was concerned about the deterioration of bronze artefacts in the collection. Gravely consulted William Erlam Smith of the Presidency College who suggested Paramasivan to work on electrolytic restoration. Paramasivan then set about setting up a conservation laboratory at the museum and worked out a technique for electrolytic restoration based on experiments and studies of earlier approaches including those by Colin G. Fink of the Metropolitan Museum in New York. Paramasivan also worked on chemical preservation techniques for paintings at the Brihadeeshwara Temple on the request of J. F. Blakiston, then director of the Archaeological Survey of India. The report of his work which included analyses of the painting techniques was read by Rutherford J. Gettens at the Freer Gallery who suggested that he publish a note to Nature. He followed this with more studies on wall paintings in India and produced a thesis on Chemical investigation of Ancient Indian Materials and Industries (1940) for which he received a DSc from Madras University. In 1946 he was transferred to the Archaeological Survey of India as an Assistant Archaeological Chemist and soon headed the chemical laboratory for the South Zone headquarters in Hyderabad. He was involved in conservation work of the wall paintings across India including those at Ajanta and Ellora. He standardized the descriptions of colours of paintings using British Standard colour cards. He retired in 1959 but continued to work, examining methods for study of materials at the Bhabha Atomic Research Centre. He conducted studies on thermoluminescence dating of pottery and also attempted using proton magnetometric surveys to detect underground objects. Experimental surveys were conducted at Kambaramedu and at Kaveripatnam. With the Oil and Natural Gas Commission he also examined marine archaeology techniques. His most significant work after retirement however was on fingerprinting techniques for South Indian bronzes to use for forensic applications.
