= N. V. Gurusamy Naidu =

Indian politician

N. V. Gurusamy Naidu was an Indian politician and former Member of the Legislative Assembly of Tamil Nadu. He was elected to the Tamil Nadu legislative assembly as a Swatantra Party candidate from Andipatti constituency in 1971 election.
