= Tho. Paramasivan =

Indian anthropologist (1950–2020)

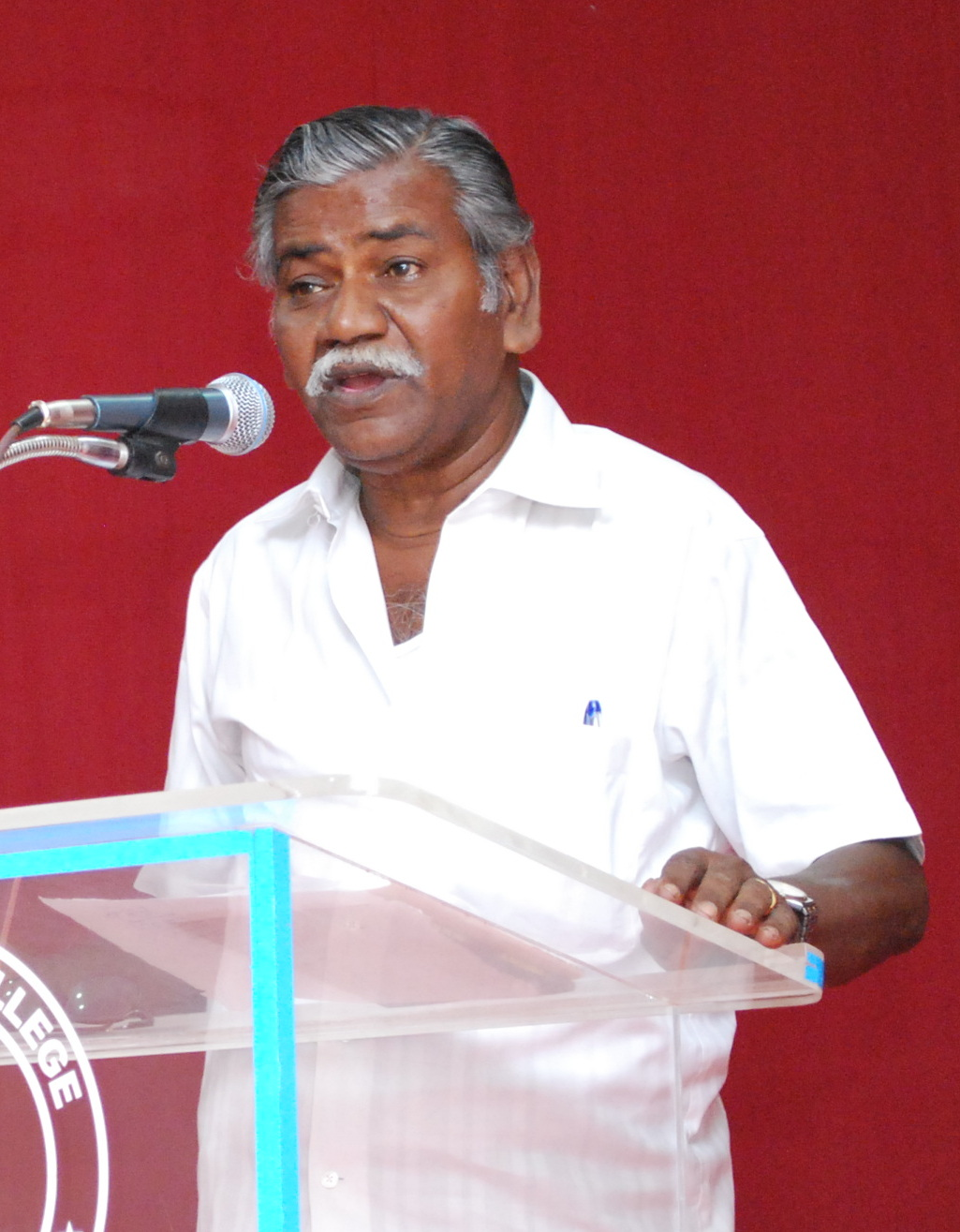
- At Madura College, Tamil Nadu
- Born: 1950; Palayamkottai, Tirunelveli, Tamil Nadu
- Died: 24 December 2020 (aged 69–70); Palayamkottai, Tirunelveli, Tamil Nadu
- Occupation: Writer
- Spouse: Isakkiammal
- Children: Masaanamani, Vijayalakshmi
- Writing career
- Language: Tamil
- Period: 1950–2020
- Subject: history
- Notable works: Alagar Kovil; Ariyapatatha Tamilagam

Tho. Paramasivan (Tamil: தொ. பரமசிவன்; 1950 – 24 December 2020), often known as Tho Pa, was an Indian Tamil anthropologist, writer, folklorist, archeologist and professor. He was the first graduate in his family. He grew up to serve as a professor of Tamil at Manonmaniam Sundaranar University, simultaneously pursuing a career in writing.

Fondly called as ‘Tho Pa’, he has written more than 15 books which focus on the historical, archaeological and anthropological aspects of Tamil society. His works also dwell a lot on folklore. One of his finest works in this area is Alagar Koil. The book, which was out of print for nearly 30 years, has been recently re-published by the Madurai Kamarajar University. He died in 2020, with his death being consoled by various important figures.

== Early life and family ==
Tho Paramasivan, fondly called Tho Pa, was born in 1950 at Palayamkottai in Tirunelveli district. Tho Pa's father died when he was young and he was raised by his mother in Tirunelveli. Paramasivan developed an interest in literature from an early age and would often indulge himself in books out of his school syllabus.

His wife Isakiyammal was a resident of Palayamkottai. The couple have a son and a daughter.

== Education ==
He completed his schooling and pursued BA in Economics at Madurai Kamarajar University. He then completed MA in Tamil from Alagappa University in Karaikudi and worked as a professor for a brief period, until he quit his job to complete his doctorate in 1976.

During his PhD, Tho Pa was instructed to research about select temples in the state. He decided to research on Azhagar Kovil in Madurai, which would later turn out to be one of his best works. His PhD thesis, which was released as a book titled Azhagar Kovil, is still widely read by Tamil scholars. In it, he looks at the history of the temple on the people rather than the architecture or the rituals inside.

== Career ==
He then went back to teaching, a professor at Zakir Hussein College and Madurai Thiyagarajar College. He then moved to Manonmaniam Sundaranar University, where he was head of the Department of Tamil from 1998 to 2008, after which he took voluntary retirement.

At a time when research on ‘material culture’ is still in its nascent stages in Tamil Nadu, Paramasivan’s book Ariyappadaatha Tamilagam provides detailed information on lost objects such as ural (a mortar which powders rice and wheat), ulakkai (a long rice pounder) as well as food and clothes used by Tamils in the past. Published in 1997, it was through this book that Paramasivan shot to limelight. Many of his other works focused on establishing the uniqueness of Tamil spiritual traditions compared to Vedic ones, and he focused on the history of folk deities rather than mainstream ones.

Paramasivan's Periyarist beliefs informed his views on temples. He believed they should be spaces opened to all rather than maintained for a few. He also looked at the oral and folk history of various Tamil communities.

In 2021, his works were nationalised by the Government of Tamil Nadu.

== Books ==
- Alagar Kovil
- Ariyapadatha Tamilakam
- Dheivam Enbathor
- Ithuvae Sananaayagam
- Inthu Desiyam
- Marabum Puthumaiyum
- Manjal Magimai
- Maanuda Vaasippu
- Panpaatu Asaivugal
- Palayamkottai - Oru Moothoor Varalaru
- Paran
- Samayangalin Arasiyal
- Samayam Or Uraiyadal
- Sevvi
- Tho.Paramasivan Nerkanalkal
- Vidupookal
- Uraikal
- Naan Hindu alla Neengal

Tho Pa wrote several books in Tamil that continue to hold value in the Tamil literary space. Lena, who was Tho Pa’s friend for over 20 years, added, "I have published his books Naan Hinduvala Neengal, Valithadangal, Theivam Enbathoor among others. He is a walking dictionary also because he knows the root words of many Tamil words. For example, he would only use the word Deivam and not Kadavul, to refer to god."

Tho Pa viewed the temple as a treasury that he always believed should reach the masses instead of the hands of people placed at top of a hierarchy. Tho Paramasivan was a Periyarist. Yet, the writer never stopped writing about the ancient history of temples. The reason, is because Tho Pa understood Periyar in great detail and he emphasised that the next generation should not just see Periyar as an atheist or as a man opposing religions.

Tho Pa used to say that Periyar always criticised the business and caste politics behind the temples. Periyar threw away a Vinayakar statue but never damaged a siru deivam (small rural god) since there was a political movement emerging out of Vinayakar. Tho Pa used to explain the difference between both.

Remembering Tho Pa, Sahitya Akademi awardee and writer Cho Dharman said, "He was a scholar to whom we could ask any doubt. He had fine skills wherein he would tell the age of a temple or a structure just by looking at it. He also had nuance to find the nature of the temple and the deity that would have been present in the structure. He was an encyclopedia."

"Many important personalities including actor-turned-politician Kamal Haasan used to visit his home. Till today, his books on Azhagar Kovil are debated by the Tamil circles. I have no words to say but that I have lost a guide," he said.

== Death ==
He had diabetes. After an ailment for a few months, he died on 24 December 2020, at Palayamkottai Government Hospital.
