= Tharasu =

Tamil-language weekly magazine

Tharasu is a Tamil language weekly magazine started in 1985 in Chennai, with a focus on politics.

Tharasu was the first of a new type of Tamil language tabloid in the 1980s. It focused on corruption and "political gossip" but also covered local village-level issues. Tharasu was perceived an "anti establishment" voice and also a sensationalistic one. Other tabloids then copied Tharasu's style. Indeed the other tabloids such as Nakeeran began with ex-Tharasu staff.

In early years Tharasu took no advertising. Instead it used low quality production methods in order to be affordable to villagers. Publishing has been a dangerous undertaking for people involved in this new tabloid genre. Some of this danger came from the police. Staff from all the tabloids operated against a background of police raids and sometimes lethal arrests. (The printer of another tabloid died after being released from custody.) In 1991 two staff from Tharasu were killed by ADMK rowdies in their own office. Tharasu's first editor not only travelled armed but also employed a guard.

Shyam, alias "Shanmugam", was the founder editor-in-chief of the magazine. Then from 2002 to 2015 the editor of the magazine was Vignesraj (late). He was special correspondent of Kumudam and Tharasu in the late 1980s. The present editor is Ravisanthosh Vignesraj.
