= List of songs recorded by Geeta Dutt =

Geeta Dutt (born Geeta Ghosh Roy Chowdhuri; 23 November 1930 – 20 July 1972) was an Indian playback singer and a famous Hindi and Bengali classical artist, born in Faridpur before the Partition of India. She found particular prominence as a playback singer in Hindi cinema. She is considered as one of the best playback singers of all time in Hindi films. She also sang many modern Bengali songs, both in the film and non-film genre.

== 1940s ==
=== 1946 ===
Film	Song	Composer(s)	Writer(s)	Co-artist(s)
Behram Khan	"Jab Chand Jawaan Hoga"	Ghulam Haider	Wali Saheb	Shamshad Begum, Munawar Sultana, Naseem Akhtar
Bhakta Prahlad	"Suno Suno Hari Ki Leela"	Hanuman Prasad, K C Verma	Rammurti Chaturvedi, Saraswati Kumar Deepak, Bhagwati Prasad Bajpai, Pandit Veer, Bekal	solo
Bhakta Prahlad	"Ab Jaani Re Pehchani Re"	Hanuman Prasad, K C Verma	Rammurti Chaturvedi, Saraswati Kumar Deepak, Bhagwati Prasad Bajpai, Pandit Veer, Bekal	solo
Bhakta Prahlad	"Suno Suno Binti Hamari"	Hanuman Prasad, K C Verma	Rammurti Chaturvedi, Saraswati Kumar Deepak, Bhagwati Prasad Bajpai, Pandit Veer, Bekal	solo
Bhakta Prahlad	"Jag Uthe Hum Jag Uthe"	Hanuman Prasad, K C Verma	Rammurti Chaturvedi, Saraswati Kumar Deepak, Bhagwati Prasad Bajpai, Pandit Veer, Bekal	solo
Circus King	"Dheere Dheere Bol Manwa"	Afzal Lahori	Raziuddin	solo
Circus King	"Duniya Mein Sab Jode"	Hari Bhai	Raziuddin	solo
Flying Prince	"Rut Albeli Aayi"	Aziz Khan	Pandit Gyan Chandra	solo
Kashmir Ki Kali	"Yeh Kisne Mere Hasraton Pe Aag Laga Di"	A. Karim	Pandit Kailash Matwaala	solo
Kashmir Ki Kali	"Haye Is Pyaar Ne Deewana Bana Rakha Hai"	A. Karim	Pandit Kailash Matwaala	solo
Mansarovar	"Jai Hind Jai Hind, Yeh Hind Ki Kahaniyan"	S. N. Tripathi	Saraswati Kumar Deepak	Mohammed Rafi
Milan	"Chhan Mein Bajegi"	Anil Biswas	P. L. Santoshi	solo
Milan	"Tumhe Saajan Manaye"	Anil Biswas	P. L. Santoshi	solo
Nai Maa	"Aaja Ri Nindiya" (version 1)	Hanuman Prasad Triloki	Ramesh Gupta	Parul Ghosh
Neecha Nagar	"Birha Ki Aag"	Ravi Shankar	Manmohan Anand, Vishwamitra Adil	solo

=== 1947 ===
Film	Song	Composer(s)	Writer(s)	Co-artist(s)
Bhookh	"Ye Hasino Ke Mele Albele"	Anil Biswas	Safdar Aah	Shamshad Begum
Bhookh	"Is Jag Mein Gareebo Ka Nahi Koi Thikana"	Anil Biswas	Safdar Aah	solo
Bhookh	"Aankh Mein Kyun Ashq"	Anil Biswas	Safdar Aah	solo
Dil Ki Rani	"O Duniya Ke Rehnewalon Bolo"	S. D. Burman	Yashonandan Joshi	chorus
Dil Ki Rani	"Bigdi Huyi Taqdeer Meri Aake Bana De"	S. D. Burman	Yashonandan Joshi	solo
Dil Ki Rani	"Kyun Balam Humse Rooth Gaye"	S. D. Burman	Yashonandan Joshi	solo
Dil Ki Rani	"Aayenge Re Mere Mann Ke Basaiya"	S. D. Burman		solo
Dil Ki Rani	"Aha Mere Mohan Ne Mujhko Bulaya"	S. D. Burman	Harikrishna Premi	solo
Do Bhai	"Yaad Rakhna Mujhe"	S. D. Burman	Raja Mehdi Ali Khan	K. S. Ragi
Do Bhai	"Aaj Preet Ka Naata Toot Gaya"	S. D. Burman	Raja Mehdi Ali Khan	G. M. Durrani
Do Bhai	"Mere Piya To Base Pardes Re"	S. D. Burman	Raja Mehdi Ali Khan	solo
Do Bhai	"Yaad Karoge Yaad Karoge Ik Din Humko"	S. D. Burman	Raja Mehdi Ali Khan	solo
Do Bhai	"Mera Sundar Sapna Beet Gaya"	S. D. Burman	Raja Mehdi Ali Khan	solo
Do Bhai	"Humein Chhod Piya Kis Desh Gaye"	S. D. Burman	Raja Mehdi Ali Khan	solo
Gaon	"Watan Ki Maati Haath Mein Lekar"	Khemchand Prakash	D. N. Madhok	Mukesh
Geet Govind	"Chamkat Dhamkat Damini Shor Karat Ghanghor"	Gyan Dutt	Pandit Indra	G. M. Durrani, Aabha
Geet Govind	"Viyogan Deep Shikha Si Jarai"	Gyan Dutt	Pandit Indra	G. M. Durrani, Rekha Rani
Jadui Ratan	"Woh Rut Badal Gayi"	Chitragupt	Behzad Lucknowi, Kamla Kant	solo
Jadui Ratan	"Mera Nanha Sa Dil Piya Loot Liya Re"	Chitragupt	Behzad Lucknowi, Kamla Kant	Radha Govind
Jadui Ratan	"Nainon Mein Aana, Mere Dil Mein Samana"	Chitragupt	Behzad Lucknowi, Kamla Kant	Radha Govind
Jai Hind	"Haule Haule Purab Jaage"	Mohan Sharma	N/A	K. S. Ragi
Kasam	"Ae Dil Bata Kis Ko Karoon Pyaar"	Sajjad Hussain	Anjum Pilibhiti	solo
Kasam	"Daman Ko Haath Se Chhuda Kar"	Sajjad Hussain	Anjum Pilibhiti	solo
Kasam	"Suna Jaa Koi Aisi Geet Ae Dil"	Sajjad Hussain	Hamid Hydrabadi	solo
Kasam	"Woh Jisko Mita Baithe"	Sajjad Hussain	Hamid Hydrabadi	solo
Kasam	"Ya Rab Hamari Aah Mein Itna Asar Hai Nahin"	Sajjad Hussain	Hamid Hydrabadi	solo
Kasam	"Kya Humse Huyi Hai Aisi Khata"	Sajjad Hussain	N/A	G. M. Durrani
Kaun Pardesi	"Gulshan Mein Chhayi Bahar"	Ali Husain	Muzatar Bahzadi	solo
Leela	"Kya Isi Ka Naam Hai Preet Re"	C. Ramchandra	Qamar Jalalabadi	Binapani Mukherjee
Leela	"O Raja Re, O Raja Mujhe Apni Bana Le"	C. Ramchandra	Qamar Jalalabadi	solo
Mere Bhagwan	"O Shyam, Meera Ke Giridhari, Ab Toh Darshan Do"	Sajjad Hussain	Shewan Rizvi	solo
Mere Bhagwan	"Mujhe Bawri Log Kahen"	Sajjad Hussain	Shewan Rizvi	solo
Neel Kamal	"Bol Bol Balam Bedardi"	B. Vasudev	Kidar Sharma	Rajkumari
Neel Kamal	"Jawaani Agar Huk"	B. Vasudev	Kidar Sharma	Rajkumari
Neel Kamal	"Maa Ne Bheja"	B. Vasudev	Kidar Sharma	Rajkumari
Neel Kamal	"Brij Mein Shor Macha	B. Vasudev	Kidar Sharma	Rajkumari, Snehal Bhatkar
Pehli Pehchan	"Muskurate Ho Kyon, Itrate Ho Kyon"	Hansraj Behl	Pandit Indra	A. R. Oza
Pehli Pehchan	"Main Hoon Phoolon Ki Rani Re"	Bulo C. Rani	Pandit Indra	solo
Rasta	"Nai Baharen Aayi, Tum Hi Na Aaye"	Zafar Khursheed	Raziuddin, Arsh Haidari	solo
Rasta	"Nai Baharen Aayi Haan"	Zafar Khursheed	Raziuddin, Arsh Haidari	solo
Sajan	"Hum Banjare, Sang Hamare Dhoom Macha Le Duniya"	C. Ramchandra	Moti	Mohammed Rafi, Lalita Deulkar
Sajan	"Sambhal Sambhalke Jaiyo Ho Banjaare"	C. Ramchandra	Rammurti Chaturvedi	Mohammed Rafi, Lalita Deulkar
Shehnai	"Jawani Ki Rail Chali Jaye Re	C. Ramchandra	P. L. Santoshi	Lata Mangeshkar, C. Ramchandra
Shehnai	"Chadhti Jawani Mein Jhulo, Jholo Meri Rani"	C. Ramchandra	P. L. Santoshi	C. Ramchandra, Binapani Mukherjee
Tohfa	"Woh Dil Gaya, Woh Dil Ke Sahare Gaaye"	M. A. Rauff Osmania	Rafiq Ghaznavi	solo
Utho Jaago	"Hans Hans Ke"	Aziz Khan, Ibrahim	N/A	solo

=== 1948 ===
Film	Song	Composer(s)	Writer(s)	Co-artist(s)
Aap Beeti	"More Saiyan Bhaye Kotwal	Hari Bhai	Hasrat Lakhnavi	Rajkumari Dubey
Actress	"Ankhon Ankhon Mein Vaah"	Shyam Sunder	Nakhshab Jarachavi	Shamshad Begum
Actress	"Ho Gori Tera Baanka Chhaila"	Shyam Sunder	Raja Mehndi Ali Khan	Shamshad Begum
Afsana	"O Dhanwan Tu De De Garibon Ko"	N/A	N/A	solo
Anjana	"Sooraj Jaaga, Dharti Jaagi"	D C Dutt	Bharat Vyas	Shankar Dasgupta
Anjana	"Sab Nagri Nagri Dhoondh Daali"	D C Dutt	Bharat Vyas	Shankar Dasgupta
Anjana	"Is Beqaraar Dil Ko Kuchh Toh Qaraar Aaye"	D C Dutt	Bharat Vyas	solo
Anjana	"Rimjhim Barse Nain, Daraaye Birha Ke Barsaat"	D C Dutt	Bharat Vyas	solo
Anjana	"Mujhe Kuchh Yaad Aata Hai"	D C Dutt	Bharat Vyas	solo
Anjana	"Dil Ke Geet Gaayenge"	D C Dutt	Vishwamitra Adil	solo
Anjuman	"Pyaari Tera Mera Mera Tera Pyaar"	Bulo C. Rani	Majrooh Sultanpuri	Shamshad Begum
Apradh	"Bhagwan Is Dil Mein Kyun Dard Hi Chhaya Hai"	N/A	Jay Kishore Mehta	solo
Apradh	"Hum Par Daya Karo Bhagwan"	N/A	N/A	Leela Mehta
Chand Sitare	"Dil Baar Baar Ghabraye, Tumhari Ghadi Ghadi Yaad Aaye"	Prem Nath	I. C. Kapoor	solo
Chand Sitare	"Aaja Mere Balma, Kaisi Suhaani Raat Hai"	Prem Nath	I. C. Kapoor	solo
Chand Sitare	"Dil Se Tumhari Yaad Bhulayi Na Jaayegi"	Prem Nath	Aziz Kashmiri	solo
Chanda Ki Chandni	"Jab Kali Kali Raatein Hongi"	Gyan Dutt	D. N. Madhok	solo
Chanda Ki Chandni	"Jab Teri Yaad Aati Hai"	Gyan Dutt	D. N. Madhok	solo
Chanda Ki Chandni	"O Jaadugar Kahe Tihari"	Gyan Dutt	D. N. Madhok	solo
Chanda Ki Chandni	"Ulfat Ke Dard Ka Kabhi Maza Lo"	Gyan Dutt	D. N. Madhok	solo
Chanda Ki Chandni	"Piya Bagho Me Papiha Bole"	Gyan Dutt	D. N. Madhok	solo
Chanda Ki Chandni	"Kaali Kaali Raat Hai"	Gyan Dutt	D. N. Madhok	solo
Chanda Ki Chandni	"Chanda Ki Chandni Hai Mauj Hai"	Gyan Dutt	D. N. Madhok	Sulochana Kadam
Chanda Ki Chandni	"Humko Bhula Diya To Yaad Meri Bhulao To Janu"	Gyan Dutt	D. N. Madhok	Sulochana Kadam
Chandralekha	"Naache Ghoda Naache"	S. Rajeswara Rao	Bharat Vyas	solo
Chunaria	"Tere Milne Ko Ji Dhadke"	Hansraj Behl	Mulk Raj Bhakri	solo
Chunaria	"O Motor Wale Babu"	Hansraj Behl	Mulk Raj Bhakri	solo
Chunaria	"Koi Naina Mila Ke Chala Gaya"	Hansraj Behl	Mulk Raj Bhakri	solo
Chunaria	"Daman Se Bandh Gayi Choli Re"	Hansraj Behl	Mulk Raj Bhakri	solo
Chunaria	"Sawan Aaya Re"	Hansraj Behl	Mulk Raj Bhakri	Zohrabai Ambalewali, Asha Bhosle
Chunaria	"Phool Ko Bhool Ke"	Hansraj Behl	Mulk Raj Bhakri	Mohammed Rafi
Didi	"Bhool Jaao Mere Meet"	Mukund Musurekar	Indeevar	solo
Didi	"Chupke Chupe Aana Mere Meet Mere Paas"	Mukund Musurekar	Indeevar	solo
Didi	"Balam Mere Haaye"	Mukund Musurekar	Indeevar	solo
Didi	"Main Hoon Naar Naveli"	Mukund Musurekar	Indeevar	solo
Gunsundari	"Nindiya Maare Boli Ke Baan"	Avinash Vyas, Bulo C Rani	Pandit Indra Chandra	solo
Gunsundari	"Khoye Huye Ko Dhoondhne"	Avinash Vyas, Bulo C Rani	Pandit Indra Chandra	solo
Gunsundari	"Bhabhi O Bhabhi Badlo Thoda Thoda Rang"	Avinash Vyas	Pandit Indra Chandra	solo
Hamraaz	"Aa Jaa Paphihe, Geet Suna Re"	Shankar Lal	Kamran Momin	solo
Hamraaz	"Ghoonghat Mein Sharmaye Dulhaniya"	Shankar Lal	Kamran Momin	solo
Heer Ranjha	"Ud Pud Janiyaan"	Sharmaji–Varmaji	Wali Saheb	solo
Heer Ranjha	"Teri Meri Kahani Dosti Ban Gayi"	Sharmaji–Varmaji	Wali Saheb	solo
Heer Ranjha	"Teri Zaat Hai Akbari Sarwari"	Sharmaji–Varmaji	Wali Saheb	solo
Heer Ranjha	"Dil Bujha Jaata Hai"	Sharmaji–Varmaji	Wali Saheb	solo
Heer Ranjha	"Dil Yun Yun Karta Hai"	Sharmaji–Varmaji	Wali Saheb	Khayyam
Heer Ranjha	"Kafas Ki Qaid Mein Humko"	Sharmaji–Varmaji	Wali Saheb	G. M. Durrani
Hip Hip Hurray	"Maine Kya Tha Kiya Jo Bujha Ke Diya"	Hanuman Prasad	Gopal Singh Nepali	solo
Hip Hip Hurray	"Chubh Gaye Naina Baan More Dil Mein"	Hanuman Prasad	Moti	solo
Hip Hip Hurray	"Aao Jawani Hum Guzaarein"	Hanuman Prasad	N/A	Shamshad Begum, Zohrabai Ambalewali, G. M. Durrani
Hua Savera	"More Mann Mein Samaaya"	Gyan Dutt	Bhagwati Prasad Bajpai	solo
Hua Savera	"Ban Ke Azaad Panchhi"	Gyan Dutt	Bhagwati Prasad Bajpai	solo
Hua Savera	"Maine Pehchan Liya, Jaan Liya"	Gyan Dutt	Bhagwati Prasad Bajpai	solo
Hua Savera	"Bole Aangana O Ri Sajaniya"	Gyan Dutt	Bhagwati Prasad Bajpai	solo
Hua Savera	"Badli Hawa, Khushi Ka Zamana Badal Gayi"	Gyan Dutt	Bhagwati Prasad Bajpai	solo
Jai Hanuman	"Raghuvar Deeb Dayal"	Bulo C. Rani		solo
Jai Hanuman	"Mohe Raam Naam Dhun Lagi"	Bulo C. Rani		solo
Jeene Do	"Bina Paaron Ke Ek Panchhi"	D. V. Gadkar	Shewan Rizvi	solo
Jeene Do	"Hum Unko Dekhnewale"	Shaukat Hossain Dehlvi	Shewan Rizvi	solo
Jeene Do	"Sun Sun Ri Bulbul"	Shaukat Hossain Dehlvi	Shewan Rizvi	solo
Jeene Do	"Aayi Hoon Tere Dwaar"	Shaukat Hossain Dehlvi	Shewan Rizvi	solo
Jeene Do	"Paighaam Garibon Ka De Do"	Shaukat Hossain Dehlvi	Shewan Rizvi	solo
Jeene Do	"Rakhi Ka Mausam Aaya Re"	Shaukat Hossain Dehlvi	Shewan Rizvi	Shankar Dasgupta
Khidki	"Tere Bina Soona Soona"	C. Ramchandra	P. L. Santoshi	Lata Mangeshkar, C. Ramchandra
Lal Dupatta	"Meethi Baatein Suna Ke"	Gyan Dutt	Shams Lakhnavi	solo
Lal Dupatta	"Bhala Ho Tera O Rula Denewale"	Gyan Dutt	Shams Lakhnavi	solo
Majboor	"Main Toh Reh Gayi Akeli"	Ghukam Haider	Nazim Panipati	solo
Majboor	"Gori Sakhiyon Se Akhiyan"	Ghukam Haider	Nazim Panipati	Lata Mangeshkar
Majboor	"Har Shai Pe Jawaani Hai"	Ghukam Haider	Nazim Panipati	Lata Mangeshkar
Mala The Mighty	"Main Jhoom Jhoom Kar Gaati Hoon"	Chitragupt	Shyam Hindi	solo
Meri Bhabhi	"Jai Ho, Vijay Ho"	R. A. Paijankar	Gulshan Jalalabadi	solo
Meri Bhabhi	"Kachhu Bole Yeh Di Akhiyan"	R. A. Paijankar	Gulshan Jalalabadi	solo
Meri Bhabhi	"Hum Bhi Jiyen, Tum Bhi Jiyo"	R. A. Paijankar	Gulshan Jalalabadi	Purushottam
Meri Bhabhi	"Maane Na Man"	R. A. Paijankar	Gulshan Jalalabadi	Sheela Shiroor
Meri Kahani	"Dil Ki Duniya Mein Chupke Chupke"	Datta Korgaongar	Zia Sarhadi	Surendra
Meri Kahani	"Bulbul Ko Mila Phool Toh Nadi Ko Kinara"	Datta Korgaongar	Zia Sarhadi	Surendra
Meri Kahani	"Ro Roke Sunate Hain Jo Hum Apna Fasana"	Datta Korgaongar	Zia Sarhadi	solo
Meri Kahani	"Sun Le Meri Kahani"	Datta Korgaongar	Zia Sarhadi	solo
Meri Kahani	"Aata Hai Zindagi Mein Aisa Bhi Zamana"	Datta Korgaongar	Zia Sarhadi	solo
Monika	"Aao Kanha Hamari Gali"	Sushant Banarji	N/A	Lata Mangeshkar
Nadiya Ke Paar	"Bajariya Mein Aiho Dagariya"	C. Ramchandra	Moti B. A.	C. Ramchandra, Lalita Devulkar
Nanad Bhojai	"Zindagi Hai Dillagi, Dillagi Hai Zindagi"	Bulo C. Rani	Pandit Indra Chandra	A. R. Oza
Nanad Bhojai	"Tum Kehte Rahe, Hum Sunte Rahe"	Bulo C. Rani	Pandit Indra Chandra	A. R. Oza
Nanad Bhojai	"Gaaun Main Dil Ka Tarana"	Bulo C. Rani	Pandit Indra Chandra	solo
Nanad Bhojai	"Gagan Pankh Ka Ek Pakheroo Duniya Mein"	Bulo C. Rani	Saraswati Kumar Deepak	solo
Nanad Bhojai	"Bana Dulhan Ka Vesh, Chali Preetam Ke Desh"	Bulo C. Rani	Saraswati Kumar Deepak	solo
Nanad Bhojai	"Aye Ji Meri Nanadi Huyi Jawaan"	Bulo C. Rani	Saraswati Kumar Deepak	solo
Padmini	"Hari Chunariya Wali Ja Dil Atka"	Ghulam Haider	Wali Saheb	solo
Padmini	"More Aangna Kaag Na Bole"	Ghulam Haider	Wali Saheb	solo
Padmini	"Tumhi Na Sunoge Toh"	Ghulam Haider	Wali Saheb	solo
Padmini	"Mora Piya Nahin Bas Mein"	Ghulam Haider	Wali Saheb	solo
Padmini	"Sapera Bin Bajaiyo Re"	Ghulam Haider	Wali Saheb	Ashok Kumar
Poojya Gandhi Ji	"Tore Bin Humein Chain Kahan"	S. Nandi	J. S. Kashyap	Mohammed Rafi
Roop Rekha	"Fariyad Ban Ke Aankh Mein Aao Na Aansuon"	S. D. Batish	Preetam Ziyayi	solo
Sagar Tarang	"Yeh Kyun Hai Bhawgwan"	Payami	N/A	solo
Sagar Tarang	"Itna Toh Bata De Prabhu"	Payami	Pardesi Balam	solo
Shaheed	"Aaja Bedardi Balmaa"	Ghulam Haider	Raja Mehndi Ali Khan	solo
Suhaag Raat	"Rhoom Jhoom Matwaale Badal Chha Gaye"	Snehal Bhatkar	Kidar Sharma	Rajkumari
Suhaag Raat	"Baaje Mori Paayal Thunak Thunak"	Snehal Bhatkar	Kidar Sharma	Rajkumari
Suhaag Raat	"Kis Paapi Sang Uljhi Ankhiyaan"	Snehal Bhatkar	Kidar Sharma	Rajkumari
Suhaag Raat	"Mere Dil Ki Dhadkanon Mein Sakhi"	Snehal Bhatkar	Kidar Sharma	Shamshad Begum
Toote Taare	"O Saiyan Mohe Le Chal Tu Dilli Ki Dair Ko"	Shaukat Ali	Anjum Pilibhiti, Rafeeq Ajmeri	Mukesh
Toote Taare	"Rehte Ho Ab Toh Har Ghadi"	Shaukat Ali	Anjum Pilibhiti, Rafeeq Ajmeri	Mukesh
Toote Taare	"Nazar Se Mili Hai Nazar Pehle Pehle"	Shaukat Ali	Anjum Pilibhiti, Rafeeq Ajmeri	solo
Toote Taare	"Armaan Bhare Dil Ko Mitti Mein Mila Daala"	Shaukat Ali	Anjum Pilibhiti, Rafeeq Ajmeri	solo

=== 1949 ===
Film	Song	Composer(s)	Writer(s)	Co-artist(s)
Amar Kahani	"Chhoti Di Ek Bagiya Mein"	Husnlal–Bhagatram	Rajendra Krishan	solo
Amar Kahani	"Yeh Kaisi Dillagi Hai"	Husnlal–Bhagatram	Rajendra Krishan	solo
Amar Kahani	"Mil Jaaye Tum Jab"	Husnlal–Bhagatram	Rajendra Krishan	solo
Bachke Rehna	"Aji Pyaar Se Munh Na Modna"	Anna Saheb	Ehsan Rizvi	C. Ramchandra
Bachke Rehna	"Tujhse Nazar Milte Hi"	Anna Saheb	Ehsan Rizvi	C. Ramchandra
Bachke Rehna	"Steady Please"	Anna Saheb	Ehsan Rizvi	C. Ramchandra
Bansaria	"Aaja Aaja Ke Jiya Mera Taras Gaye"	Husnlal–Bhagatram	Mulkraj Bhakri	solo
Bansaria	"Tere Saamne Hum Aansoo Bahayenge"	Husnlal–Bhagatram	Mulkraj Bhakri	solo
Bhool Bhulaiya	"Ankhiyon Se Neend Chura Ke Le Gaya Koyi"	Bulo C. Rani	Rajendra Krishan	solo
Chakori	"Nainon Mein Jhoola Daala"	Husnlal–Bhagatram	Mulkraj Bhakri	solo
Chakori	"Nainon Mein Bhar Liya Neer"	Husnlal–Bhagatram	Mulkraj Bhakri	solo
Chakori	"Chitthiyan Dard Bhari"	Husnlal–Bhagatram	Mulkraj Bhakri	solo
Chakori	"Rooth Gayi Humse Piya"	Husnlal–Bhagatram	Mulkraj Bhakri	solo
Daroga Ji	"Aasman Se Door Tara Ho Gaya"	Bulo C. Rani	Khawar Zaman	solo
Daroga Ji	"Ho Jawaniyan Nigodi Sataaye Haye"	Bulo C. Rani	M. L. Khanna	solo
Daroga Ji	"Jeena Mushkil, Marna Mushkil"	Bulo C. Rani	M. L. Khanna	solo
Daroga Ji	"Ab Kaun Sunega Haye Re"	Bulo C. Rani	M. L. Khanna	solo
Daroga Ji	"Meri Soyi Preet Jaga Ke Bichhad"	Bulo C. Rani	M. L. Khanna	solo
Daroga Ji	"Piya Milan Ke Din Aaye"	Bulo C. Rani	M. L. Khanna	solo
Daroga Ji	"Apne Saajan Ke Mann Mein"	Bulo C. Rani	M. L. Khanna	solo
Daroga Ji	"Mori Tujhse Ulajh Gayi Ankhiyan"	Bulo C. Rani	M. L. Khanna	solo
Daroga Ji	"Mere Mann Ke Gagan Mein Aaj"	Bulo C. Rani	M. L. Khanna	solo
Daroga Ji	"Kotwal Daroga Apna, Ki Ab Darr Kahe Ka"	Bulo C. Rani	M. L. Khanna	solo
Daroga Ji	"Le Jaa Babu, Yeh Meri Nishaani"	Bulo C. Rani	M. L. Khanna	solo
Dil Ki Basti	"Aankh Kein Aansoo, Dil Majboor"	Ghulam Mohammad	Shakeel Badayuni	solo
Dil Ki Basti	"Jal Jal Ke Kahen Hum Ji Se"	Ghulam Mohammad	Shakeel Badayuni	solo
Dil Ki Basti	"Yehi Hai Dil Ki Basti"	Ghulam Mohammad	Shakeel Badayuni	G. M. Durrani
Dil Ki Basti	"Naazuk Dil Hai, Tod Na Dena"	Ghulam Mohammad	Shakeel Badayuni	G. M. Durrani
Dil Ki Basti	"Na Tum Mere, Na Dil Mera"	Ghulam Mohammad	Waheed Qureshi	solo
Dil Ki Basti	"O Pardesiya, O Rasiya"	Ghulam Mohammad	Khumar Barabankvi	Zohrabai Ambalewali
Dillagi	"Tu Mera Chand Main Teri Chandni"	Naushad	Shakeel Badayuni	solo
Ek Thi Ladki	"Unse Kehna Ki Woh Pal Bhar Ke Liye Aa Jaye"	Vinod	Aziz Kashmiri	solo
Ek Thi Ladki	"Dilli Se Aaya Bhai Tingu"	Vinod	Aziz Kashmiri	solo
Garibi	"Dukhon Mein Jo Miskura Rahe The"	Bulo C. Rani	Shewan Rizvi	solo
Garibi	"Dard Dil Hi Mein Chhupa Le"	Bulo C. Rani	Rajendra Krishan	solo
Hamari Manzil	"Baithi Hoon Main Nain Bichhaye"	Husnlal–Bhagatram	Rajendra Krishan	solo
Hamari Manzil	"Kaante Banenge Kaliyan, Kaanto Se Jhelta Jaa"	Husnlal–Bhagatram	Mohammed Rafi	
Hamari Manzil	"Badla Hua Duniya Mein Woh Aur Zamana Tha"	Husnlal–Bhagatram	Mohammed Rafi	Qamar Jalalabadi
Hamari Manzil	"Saajan Se Bichhad Kar Dil Ne Kaha"	Husnlal–Bhagatram	solo	Qamar Jalalabadi
Hamari Manzil	"Nnainon Se Nain Milake Jiya Tadpa Gaye"	Husnlal–Bhagatram	solo	N/A
Hamari Manzil	"Tere Aane Par Dil Dhadke"	Husnlal–Bhagatram	solo	N/A
Imtihan	"Koi Humko Na Chhodo"	Shyam Babu Pathak	Yashonandan Joshi	solo
Imtihan	"Zindagi Bhaati Nahin Aur Maut Bhi Aati Nahin"	Shyam Babu Pathak	Harikrishna Premi	solo
Imtihan	"Humein Dele Jaana Nishaani"	Shyam Babu Pathak	A. N. Sharma	solo
Imtihan	"Dekho Dil Deke Tamasha Dekho"	Shyam Babu Pathak	Indeevar	solo
Jeet	"Kyun Na Dukh Jhelo, Praan Ganwao"	Shyam Babu Pathak	Prem Dhawan	Vinod
Jeet	"Suno Suno Banwari More"	Shyam Babu Pathak	Prem Dhawan	Vinod
Jeevan Sathi	"Mohabbat Ke Vaade Nibha"	S. Mohinder	Hamid Khumar	solo
Kamal	"Kehne Ko Hai Taiyar Magar"	S. D. Burman	Gopal Singh Nepali	Surendra
Kamal	"Ik Roz Bichhadnewalon Ka"	S. D. Burman	Gopal Singh Nepali	solo
Kamal	"Mere Kashti Ko Mohabbat Ka Kinara Mil Gaya"	S. D. Burman	Raja Mehdi Ali Khan	solo
Kamal	"Toote Bandhan Toote Bandhan Aaj Re"	S. D. Burman	Prem Dhawan	solo
Kamal	"Bharat Maata Zanjeeron Mein"	S. D. Burman	Prem Dhawan	solo
Kaneez	"Jiya Mora Haale Dole Ho"	Ghulam Mohammad	Hasrat Lakhnavi	solo
Kaneez	"Paake Nazron Ka Ishaara"	Ghulam Mohammad	Sarshar Sailani	solo
Karwat	"Baadal Ghir Aaye, Rinjhim Barse Paani"	Hansraj Behl	D. N. Madhok	Asha Bhosle
Karwat	"O Chanda Baadal Mein Mukh Le Chhipa"	Hansraj Behl	Charandas	solo
Karwat	"Chal Diye Munh Pher Kar"	Hansraj Behl	Butaram Sharma	solo
Karwat	"Gaa Aye Dil Matwale"	Hansraj Behl	Saif Uddin Saif	
Karwat	"Main Angoor Ki Bel Piya More"	Hansraj Behl	Saif Uddin Saif	S. D. Batish
Karwat	"Gaya Andhera Hua Savera"	Hansraj Behl	Saraswati Kumar Deepak	Mohammed Rafi
Lekh	"Tu Muskura, Mere Lab Pe Hansi Rahe"	M. A. Krishan Dayal	Qamar Jalalabadi	solo
Naach	"Chhak Chhak Chali Hai Rail Hamari"	Husnlal–Bhagatram	Mulkraj Bhakri	Lata Mangeshkar
Naach	"Lab Pe Fariyad Hai, Dil Barnaad Hai"	Husnlal–Bhagatram	Mulkraj Bhakri	Lata Mangeshkar, Mohammed Rafi
Naach	"Kyun Karta Maan Jawani Ka"	Husnlal–Bhagatram	Mulkraj Bhakri	Lata Mangeshkar, Mohammed Rafi
Nazaare	"Duniya Ke Andheri Raat Mein"	Bulo C. Rani	Rajendra Krishan	Shamshad Begum, G. M. Durrani
Nazaare	"Bahaar Aayi Chaman Ke Patte Par"	Bulo C. Rani	Rajendra Krishan	Shamshad Begum, G. M. Durrani
Nazaare	"Puraane Chahnewalon Se"	Bulo C. Rani	Rajendra Krishan	G. M. Durrani
Nazaare	"Meri Mann Mein Dol, Aankhon Mein Bol"	Bulo C. Rani	Rajendra Krishan	G. M. Durrani
Nazaare	"Yeh Rut Mastani Hai"	Bulo C. Rani	Rajendra Krishan	solo
Paras	"Koi Pukare Piya Piya"	Ghulam Mohammad	Shakeel Badayuni	solo
Raat Ki Rani	"Anyaai Sansra Jhoothe Hai"	Hansraj Behl	N/A	solo
Raat Ki Rani	"Duniya Ki Sabha Pal Chhin Hi Sahi"	Hansraj Behl	Rajendra Krishan	solo
Raat Ki Rani	"Jabse Teri Yaad Ko Dil Mein Basaya"	Hansraj Behl	A. Shah	solo
Rakhi	"Nigahon Mein Andhera Chha Raha Hai"	Husnlal–Bhagatram	Sarshar Sailani	solo
Rakhi	"Are Jaanewale Idhar Dekhta Jaa"	Husnlal–Bhagatram	Sarshar Sailani	solo
Ram Vivah	"Dhanya Dhanya Hai Avadhpur"	Shankar Rao Vyas	Moti	Manna Dey
Roshni	"Pehen Chunariya Kaali Jhilmil Deepon Walo"	C. Ramchandra	P. L. Santoshi	solo
Sanwariya	"Jaani Re Hum Jaani Re"	C. Ramchandra	P. L. Santoshi	Lata Mangeshkar
Sawan Bhadon	"Do Dil Jiske Paas Sipaiya"	Husnlal–Bhagatram	Mulkraj Bhakri	solo
Sawan Bhadon	"Taare Gin Gin Ke Kaatte Hai Raat Meri"	Husnlal–Bhagatram	Mulkraj Bhakri	solo
Shabnam	"Mera Dil Tadpa Kar Kahan Chala"	S. D. Burman	Qamar Jalalabadi	solo
Shabnam	"Kismat Mein Bichhadna Tha"	S. D. Burman	Qamar Jalalabadi	Mukesh
Sipahiya	"Chalo Ghoonghat Mein Guyiyan Chhupake"	C. Ramchandra	Rammurti Chaturvedi	Lata Mangeshkar
Sunehre Din	"Umamgon Ke Din Beeti Jaaye"	Gyan Dutt	D. N. Madhok	Shamshad Begum, Sulochana Kadam
Sunehre Din	"Jiya Ka Diya Piya Tim Tim Hoye"	Gyan Dutt	Shekhar	Shamshad Begum, Khan Mastana, G. M. Durrani
Tara	"Mithai Ki Dukaan Mere Dilli Ki Bazaar"	Vinod	Aziz Kashmiri	Gandhari
Tara	"Khelenge Kaun Sa Khel Mere Lal"	Vinod	Aziz Kashmiri	Premlata
Tara	"Kab Tak Nirdhan Ke Dil Se Khelenge"	Vinod	Aziz Kashmiri	solo
Tara	"Ik Teri Yaad Hai Jeene Ke Liye"	Vinod	Aziz Kashmiri	solo
Vikram Shashikala	"Aaj Ka Din Tohe Yaad Rahe"	Dattaram Gadekar	Dukhi Amritsari	Pandya
Vikram Shashikala	"Tere Ek Ishaare Pe Duniya Loota Doon"	Dattaram Gadekar	Dukhi Amritsari	Pandya
Vikram Shashikala	"Aao Nain Mila Ke Chhodke Jaanewal Aa Jaa"	Dattaram Gadekar	Dukhi Amritsari	solo
Zevarat	"Yeh Kaun Mere Ghar Aaya"	Hansraj Behl	Habeeb Sarhadi	solo
Zevarat	"Aana Sajanwa Aana Jab Naina Lade"	Hansraj Behl	Habeeb Sarhadi	solo
Zevarat	"Aaya Mera Saajan Aaya"	Hansraj Behl	Habeeb Sarhadi	solo

== 1950s ==
=== 1950 ===
Film	Song	Composer(s)	Writer(s)	Co-artist(s)
Aadhi Raat	"Dil Zakhmon Se Choor"	Husnlal–Bhagatram	Sarshar Sailani	Mohammed Rafi
Aadhi Raat	"Maine Balam Se Poochha, Miloge Kahan"	Husnlal–Bhagatram	Rajendra Krishan	Meena Kapoor
Aahuti	"Dil Ke Bas Mein"	D. C. Dutt	Tandon Jodhpuri	Shankar Dasgupta
Aahuti	"Suraj Laga"	D. C. Dutt	Tandon Jodhpuri	Shankar Dasgupta
Aahuti	"Lehron Se Khele Chanda"	D. C. Dutt	Tandon Jodhpuri	Shankar Dasgupta
Aahuti	"Dil Jo Tumko De Diya"	D. C. Dutt	Tandon Jodhpuri	solo
Aahuti	"Taron Bhari Chunariya"	D. C. Dutt	Tandon Jodhpuri	solo
Aahuti	"Char Dino ki Atkheliya"	D. C. Dutt	Tandon Jodhpuri	Shanti Varma
Afsar	"Preet Ka Naata Jodnewale"	S. D. Burman	Narendra Sharma	Suraiya
Baawra	"Shama Jalti Hain Jo Parwane Chale Aate Hai"	Krishna Dayal	Gagil Harnalvi	Mohammed Rafi
Baawra	"Meri Duniya Ki Shaayad Har Khushi Kam Hoti Jaati Hai"	Randhir Sahityalankar		
Baawra	"Aa Jaa Zara Mukhdaa Dikha Jaa"	Raghupat Rai		
Bawre Nain	"Khayalon Mein Kisi Ke"	Roshan	Kidar Sharma	Mukesh
Bebus	"Meri Uthto Girti Nazren"	Pandit Ganpatrao, S. K. Pal	Jalal Malihabadi, Salik Lakhnavi	solo
Bebus	"Nayi Naveli Preet Huyi Re"	Pandit Ganpatrao, S. K. Pal	Jalal Malihabadi, Salik Lakhnavi	solo
Bebus	"Kya Tujhko Hua Aakhir"	Pandit Ganpatrao, S. K. Pal	Jalal Malihabadi, Salik Lakhnavi	Mukesh
Bhed	"Kaise Keh Doon Ke Koi Nera"	Mukul Roy	Madhukar Rajasthani	Vinod Kumar
Bhed	"Shama Ka Saathi Kaun"	Mukul Roy	Madhukar Rajasthani	S. Balbir
Bhed	"Fariyad Sun Prabhu Meri"	Mukul Roy	Madhukar Rajasthani	solo
Bhed	"Ro Kar Jo Main Karto Hoon"	Mukul Roy	Madhukar Rajasthani	solo
Bhed	"Dil Bhi Hanse Main Bhi Hansoon"	Mukul Roy	Madhukar Rajasthani	solo
Bhimsen	"Aaj Nhanwar Mein Naiya Kanhaiya"	Avinash Vyas	Saraswati Kumar Deepak	solo
Bhimsen	"Rakho Laaj Hamari Prabhu Ji"	Avinash Vyas	Saraswati Kumar Deepak	solo
Bhimsen	"Thanak Thanak Thai Tha Tha, Sabse Bada Vidhata"	Avinash Vyas	Saraswati Kumar Deepak	solo
Bhimsen	"Aaj Mori Bagiya Mein Bole Bulbul Bole"	Avinash Vyas	B. P. Bhargav	solo
Bhimshma Pratigya	"O Pagle Manwa Hai Kyun Ab Rota"	S. K. Pal	M. L. Khanna	solo
Bhimshma Pratigya	"Chanchal Pawan Chale"	S. K. Pal	M. L. Khanna	solo
Bijli	"Mera Jiya Ghabraye Tera Chhotasa Gaaon Mein"	Khemchand Prakash	Bharat Vyas	Paro Devi
Birha Ki Raat	"Dard Kyun Utha Hain Dil Mein"	Husnlal–Bhagatram	Sarshar Sailani	solo
Birha Ki Raat	"Ik Baar Nigaahen Milti Hai"	Husnlal–Bhagatram	Sarshar Sailani	solo
Biwi	"Kya Teri Bigadta Hai"	Khayyam	Nazim Panipati	solo
Biwi	"Beech Ghunghat Kaise Keh Doon"	Khayyam, Aziz Khan	Nazim Panipati	solo
Biwi	"Mausam Hai Namkeen Sawariya"	Aziz Khan	Nazim Panipati	Asha Bhosle
Dilruba	"Dil Mein Kisi Ka Pyaar"	Gyan Dutt	Rajendra Krishan	Pramodini Desai
Dilruba	"Humne Khayi Hai Mohabbat Mein Jawani Ka Kasam"	Gyan Dutt	S. H. Bihari	G. M. Durrani
Dilruba	"O Preet Bhulamewala Bataa"	Gyan Dutt	N/A	solo
Dilruba	"Dil Tootna Tha, Dil Toot Gaya"	Gyan Dutt	Butaram Sharma	solo
Dilruba	"Mere Nainon Mein"	Gyan Dutt	Rajendra Krishan	solo
Dilruba	"Tum Dil Mein Chale Aate Ho"	Gyan Dutt	Neelkanth Tiwari	solo
Dilruba	"Tarsa Ke Na Jaa"	Gyan Dutt	N/A	solo
Dilruba	"Dekho Ji Mora Bhala Sa Jiya"	Gyan Dutt	N/A	solo
Dilruba	"Dhak Dhak Karti Chali"	Gyan Dutt	N/A	solo
Diwanji	"Kise Apni Sunaoon Kahaani"	S. Banerjee	N/A	solo
Dolti Nayya	"Zara Dil Ko Lagana Dambhaa	Ram Prasad	Prakash	solo
Gauna	"Yeh Teri Kahani Aur Meri Zubaani"	Husnlal–Bhagatram	Qamar Jalalabadi	solo
Gauna	"Mujhse Yeh Keh Rahi Hai Tasveer Ki Lakeeren"	Husnlal–Bhagatram	Qamar Jalalabadi	Shamshad Begum
Hamara Ghar	"Dekho Toh Dil Hi Dil Mein"	Chitragupt	Anjum Jaipuri	Shamshad Begum, Shanti Varma
Hamara Ghar	"Chupke Chupke Din Mein Aanewale"	Chitragupt	Anjum Jaipuri	Mohammed Rafi
Hamara Ghar	"Chandni Chhitki Hui Hai"	Chitragupt	Anjum Jaipuri	Mohammed Rafi
Hamari Beti	"Kisne Yeh, Kisne Yeh, Kisne Yeh Chhedi Taar"	Snehal Bhatkar	Randhir Sahityalankar	Mukesh
Hamari Beti	"Berukhi Bas Ho Chuki Maan Jaaiye"	Snehal Bhatkar	Randhir Sahityalankar	Mukesh
Har Har Mahadev	"Hulululu Haal Re, More Aangna Mein Lal Aayo Re"	Avinash Vyas	Ramesh Shastri	chorus
Har Har Mahadev	"Shiv Stuti"	Avinash Vyas	N/A	"Avinash Vyas, Badrinath Vyas
Har Har Mahadev	"Bholanath Se Nirala"	Avinash Vyas	Saraswati Kumar Deepak	Badrinath Vyas
Har Har Mahadev	"Shivshankar Bhole Bhale"	Avinash Vyas	Saraswati Kumar Deepak	solo
Har Har Mahadev	"Rumjhum Chali Jaoon"	Avinash Vyas	Ramesh Shastri	solo
Har Har Mahadev	"Gungun Gunjan Karta Bhanwara"	Avinash Vyas	Ramesh Shastri	solo
Har Har Mahadev	"Kankar Kankar Se Main Poochhun"	Avinash Vyas	Ramesh Shastri	solo
Har Har Mahadev	"Mann Na Maane Mann Ki Batiyan"	Avinash Vyas	Ramesh Shastri	solo
Jalte Deep	"Nayi Ek Duniya Basayenge Hum Tum"	Shardul Kwatra	M. A. Taj	G. M. Durrani
Jalte Deep	"Aayi Milne Ki Raat"	Shardul Kwatra	Aziz Kashmiri	Meena Kapoor
Jalte Deep	"Taaron Bhari Raat Mein Yaad Tumhari Aaye"	Shardul Kwatra	Nazim Panipati	solo
Jalte Deep	"Humein Apne Dil Se Juda Kar Rahe Ho"	T. K. Das	Nazim Panipati	solo
Jan Pehchan	"Armaan Bhare Dil Ki Lagan Tere Liye Hai"	Khemchand Prakash, Manna Dey	Shakeel Badayuni	Talat Mahmood
Jan Pehchan	"Aaoge Na Saajan"	Khemchand Prakash, Manna Dey	Shakeel Badayuni	solo
Jan Pehchan	"Nain Milake Dil Chheena"	Khemchand Prakash, Manna Dey	Shakeel Badayuni	solo
Jan Pehchan	"Pardesi Se Lag Gayi Preet Re"	Khemchand Prakash, Manna Dey	Shakeel Badayuni	solo
Jan Pehchan	"Bhoolnewale Tujhe Apne Jafaon Ki Kasam"	Khemchand Prakash, Manna Dey	Shakeel Badayuni	solo
Jan Pehchan	"Duniya Mohabbat Karne Na Degi"	Khemchand Prakash, Manna Dey	Shakeel Badayuni	solo
Janmashtami	"Manmohan Aao Ji, Ro Ro Pukare Virhan Radhika"	Shankar Babu Pathak	Bharat Vyas	solo
Janmashtami	"Man Maane Ki Baat Re Oodho"	Shankar Babu Pathak	Bharat Vyas	solo
Janmashtami	"Mohan Hanare Madhuban Mein Tum"	Shankar Babu Pathak	Bharat Vyas	solo
Janmashtami	"Haan Baiyab Kyun Humse Chhudaye"	Shankar Babu Pathak	Bharat Vyas	solo
Jogan	"Zara Tham Ja Tu Ae Sawan"	Bulo C. Rani	Himmat Rai Sharma	solo
Jogan	"Ghunghat Ke Pat Khol"	Bulo C. Rani	Meera Bai	solo
Jogan	"Mein Tou Girdhar Ke Ghar Jaoon"	Bulo C. Rani	Meera Bai	solo
Jogan	"Mein Tou Prem Diwani"	Bulo C. Rani	Meera Bai	solo
Jogan	"Mat Ja Mat Ja Jogi"	Bulo C. Rani	Meera Bai	solo
Jogan	"Uthat Chale Awaduth"	Bulo C. Rani	Meera Bai	solo
Jogan	"Daro Re Rang, Daro Re Rasiya"	Bulo C. Rani	Pandit Indra	solo
Jogan	"Gend Kheelun Kanha Ke Sang"	Bulo C. Rani	Pandit Indra	solo
Jogan	"Chanda Khele Ankh Micholi"	Bulo C. Rani	Pandit Indra	solo
Jogan	"Sakhri Chitchor Nahi Aye"	Bulo C. Rani	Pandit Indra	solo
Jogan	"Dwar Khule Mann Mandir Ke"	Bulo C. Rani	Pandit Indra	solo
Jogan	"Dag Mag Dag Mag Dole Naiya"	Bulo C. Rani	Kidar Sharma	solo
Khamosh Sipahi	"Jhoom Jhoom Kar Baadal Aaye"	Hansraj Behl	D. N. Madhok	Mohammed Rafi
Khamosh Sipahi	"Ab Kisko Sunaayen Gham Ke Fasane"	Hansraj Behl	D. N. Madhok	Mohammed Rafi
Khamosh Sipahi	"Utho Bulbulon, Tod Do Teeliyan"	Hansraj Behl	D. N. Madhok	Mohammed Rafi, chorus
Khamosh Sipahi	"Mere Jaisi Nahin Milegi"	Hansraj Behl	D. N. Madhok	Mohammed Rafi, Ram Kamlani
Khamosh Sipahi	"Keh Do Keh Do Kaali Kaali Badli Daraye Na"	Hansraj Behl	D. N. Madhok	Surinder Kaur
Khel	"Saajna Din Bahure Hamaare"	Sajjad Hussain	Arzoo Lakhnavi	solo
Khel	"Tu Kahan Chala Mukh Mod Ke"	Sajjad Hussain	Khawar Zaman	G. M. Durrani
Kis Ki Yaad	"Hum Paas Aaye, Tum Door Gaye"	Hansraj Behl	Qamar Jalalabadi	Devendra
Kis Ki Yaad	"Koi Mujhko Na Bulaye"	Hansraj Behl	Qamar Jalalabadi	solo
Kis Ki Yaad	"Yeh Hamari Dua Hai Tumhari Kasam"	Hansraj Behl	Qamar Jalalabadi	solo
Kis Ki Yaad	"Tadapta Chhod Kar Mujhko"	Hansraj Behl	solo	solo
Kis Ki Yaad	"Kabhi Yeh Saath Na Toote"	Hansraj Behl	solo	Mohammed Rafi, Paro Devi
Lavangi	"Sajaniya Jhoom Jhoom Kar Gaaye"	Bulo C. Rani, C. S. Ram	Sarawsati Kumar Deepak	solo
Lavangi	"Sang Hai Deepak Aur Patanga"	Bulo C. Rani, C. S. Ram	Sarawsati Kumar Deepak	solo
Maang	"Aaya Achanak Aisa Jhonka" (part 1)	Ghulam Mohammad	Sagir Usmani	Hamida Banu
Maang	"Aaya Achanak Aisa Jhonka" (part 2)	Ghulam Mohammad	Sagir Usmani	Hamida Banu
Magroor	"Sitamgar Kiya Vaar"	Sajjad Hussain, Bulo C. Rani, Ram Panjwani	Raja Mehdi Ali Khan	solo
Man Ka Meet	"Mil Gaye Koi Dilwala"	Shardul Kwatra	Sarshar Sailani	A. R. Oza
Man Ka Meet	"Machalta Hua Dil Sambhala Na Jaaye"	Shardul Kwatra	Sarshar Sailani	G. M. Durrani
Man Ka Meet	"Chale Hain Thokrein Khaate"	Shardul Kwatra	Sarshar Sailani	solo
Man Ka Meet	"Chandavadani Sundar Sajni"	Shardul Kwatra	Sarshar Sailani	solo
Mashaal	"Kitni Sach Hai Yeh Baat Re"	S. D. Burman	Kavi Pradeep	solo
Meherbani	"Aayi Basant Rut Odhe Chunariya"	Hafiz Khan	Khumar Barabankvi	Shamshad Begum
Naagan, Unreleased film	"Tere Bin Sajna, Dil Mera Chain Nahin Paayega"	Pandit Amarnath, Harbanslal	N/A	solo
Naagan, Unreleased film	"Zindagi Naam Hai Thokar Ka"		N/A	solo
Nishana	"Kaisi Murali Bajayi Shaam Ne"	Khursheed Anwar	Nakhshab Jarachavi	solo
Nishana	"Seene Ki Dhadkan Tez Huyi"	Khursheed Anwar	Nakhshab Jarachavi	solo
Nishana	"Tu Tu Tu Ghar Aaja"	Khursheed Anwar	Nakhshab Jarachavi	solo
Nishana	"Woh Rooth Gaye, Dil Toot Gaya"	Khursheed Anwar	Nakhshab Jarachavi	solo
Preet Ka Geet	"Ek Taraf Kal Raha Deepak"	Shyam Babu Pathak	Premi	Mukesh, Zohrabai Ambalewali
Preet Ka Geet	"Paayal Bole Re"	Shyam Babu Pathak	Premi	Mukesh, Zohrabai Ambalewali
Preet Ka Geet	"Kholo Kholo Man Je Dwaar"	Shyam Babu Pathak	Premi	solo
Preet Ka Geet	"Kisise Hum Nahin Kehte"	Shyam Babu Pathak	Premi	solo
Preet Ka Geet	"Daar Daar Khojen Tujhko Balam"	Shyam Babu Pathak	Premi	solo
Preet Ka Geet	"Main Preet Ka Geet Sunaoon"	Shyam Babu Pathak	Premi	solo
Putli	"Kabhi Ganga Ke Paar"	Shyam Hindi, Ghulam Haider	Wali Saheb	Shamshad Begum
Putli	"Ek Dilli Ke Rasiya"	Shyam Hindi, Ghulam Haider	Wali Saheb	solo
Putli	"Teri Lagan Tadpaaye"	Shyam Hindi, Ghulam Haider	Wali Saheb	solo
Putli	"Haye Meri Pardesi Jugnu"	Shyam Hindi, Ghulam Haider	Wali Saheb	solo
Pyar	"O Bewafa Ye To Bata"	S. D. Burman	Rajendra Krishan	Kishore Kumar
Pyar	"Ek Hum Aur Dusre Tum"	S. D. Burman	Rajendra Krishan	Kishore Kumar
Pyar	"Woh Sapnewali Raat"	S. D. Burman	Rajendra Krishan	solo
Pyar	"Aa Gayi Re Aa Gayi"	S. D. Burman	Rajendra Krishan	solo
Pyar	"Do Din Hansaya Pyar Ne"	S. D. Burman	Rajendra Krishan	solo
Pyar	"Chup Chup Chup Aa Gayi Re"	S. D. Burman	Rajendra Krishan	solo
Pyar Ki Manzil	"Aankhon Mein Anakhen Daal"	Husnlal–Bhagatram	Rajendra Krishan	solo
Raj Mukut	"Ghoonghat Pe Na Jaiyo, Ghoonghat Utaar Ke"	Govind Ram	Bharat Vyas	Lata Mangeshkar
Raj Mukut	"Meri Lagi Kisi Se Preet"	Govind Ram	Bharat Vyas	solo
Rupaiya	"Teeki Huyi Thi Jin Par Nazren"	P. Ramakant	Indeevar	solo
Saudamini	"Mujhko Unse Pyaar Hua"	S. N. Tripathi	B. D. Nishra	solo
Saudamini	"Kaali Kaali Badli Chhayi"	S. N. Tripathi	Anjum Pilibhiti, Arjun, P. C. Joshi	solo
Saudamini	"Toot Gaya Sab Sapna Mera"	S. N. Tripathi	Anjum Pilibhiti, Arjun, P. C. Joshi	solo
Saudamini	"O Paagal Premi, Prem Koye Kya Paaya"	S. N. Tripathi	Anjum Pilibhiti, Arjun, P. C. Joshi	solo
Shaan	"Duniya Gol Mol"	Hansraj Behl	N/A	solo
Shadi Ki Raat	"Main Bhi Jawaan, Gori Tu Bhi Jawaan"	Govind Ram	Firoz Jalandhari	solo
Sheesh Mahal	"Aayi Hai Deewali Sakhi Aayi Sakhi Aayi"	Vasant Desai	Nazim Panipati	Shamshad Begum
Sheesh Mahal	"Jise Dhundti Phirti Hai Meri Nazar"	Vasant Desai	Nazim Panipati	Mohammed Rafi
Sheesh Mahal	"Hum Kheto Ke Maharaj"	Vasant Desai	Nazim Panipati	Pushpa Hans, Mohammed Rafi
Shri Ganesh Mahima	"Sakhi Ro Mera Man Nache"	S. N. Tripathi	Anjum Jaipuri	solo
Shri Ganesh Mahima	"O Mohan Murliwale"	S. N. Tripathi	Ramesh Pandey	solo
Shri Ganesh Mahima	"Taaron Ke Paalne"	S. N. Tripathi	Ramesh Pandey	solo
Shri Ganesh Mahima	"Mere Nainon Mein Preet"	S. N. Tripathi	Ramesh Pandey	solo
Surajmukhi	"Door Se Ek Pardesi Aaya" (female)	Husnlal–Bhagatram	Gulshan Jalalabadi, Rajendra Krishan	solo
Surajmukhi	"Saajan Tumne Chhoda Humko"	Husnlal–Bhagatram	Gulshan Jalalabadi, Rajendra Krishan	solo
Surajmukhi	"Aabad Rahe Tera Ghar Munshi"	Husnlal–Bhagatram	Gulshan Jalalabadi, Rajendra Krishan	solo
Surajmukhi	"O Mere Rasiya"	Husnlal–Bhagatram	Gulshan Jalalabadi, Rajendra Krishan	solo
Surajmukhi	"Ek Toote Huye Dil Ka Kise Dard Sunaayen"	Husnlal–Bhagatram	Gulshan Jalalabadi, Rajendra Krishan	solo
Surajmukhi	"Dil Unse Kehte Darta Hai"	Husnlal–Bhagatram	Gulshan Jalalabadi, Rajendra Krishan	Lata Mangeshkar
Surajmukhi	"Suniye Huzoor Pyaar Ka Charcha"	Husnlal–Bhagatram	Gulshan Jalalabadi, Rajendra Krishan	S. D. Batish
Veer Babruvahan	"Jeet Ho Hamari Jeet Ho"	Chitragupt	Anjum Jaipuri	Mohammed Rafi
Veer Babruvahan	"Sab Sapne Pure Aaj Huye"	Chitragupt	Anjum Jaipuri	Mohammed Rafi
Veer Babruvahan	"Door Desh La Raja"	Chitragupt	Anjum Jaipuri	Mohammed Rafi
Veer Babruvahan	"Dheere Dheere Behti Naiyya"	Chitragupt	Anjum Jaipuri	solo
Wafaa	"Gehri Gehri Nindiya Mein Soye Matwale"	Vinod	D. N. Madhok	Asha Bhosle

=== 1951 ===
Film	Song	Composer(s)	Writer(s)	Co-artist(s)
Ada	"Sachchi Baaten Batane Mein Kaisa Sharam"	Madan Mohan	Saraswati Kumar Deepak	solo
Baazi	"Suno Gahar Kya Gaaye"	S. D. Burman	Sahir Ludhianvi	solo
Baazi	"Dekhke Akeli Mohe"	S. D. Burman	Sahir Ludhianvi	solo
Baazi	"Tadbeer Se Bigdi Hui"	S. D. Burman	Sahir Ludhianvi	solo
Baazi	"Aaj Ki Raat Piya"	S. D. Burman	Sahir Ludhianvi	solo
Baazi	"Tum Bhi Na Bhulo Balam"	S. D. Burman	Sahir Ludhianvi	solo
Baazi	"Yeh Kaun Aaya"	S. D. Burman	Sahir Ludhianvi	solo
Bahaar	"Bhagwan Do Ghadi Zara Insaan Ban Ke Dekh"	S. D. Burman	Rajendra Krishan	solo
Bahaar	"Sataaye Huye Ko Sataato Hai Duniya"	S. D. Burman	Rajendra Krishan	solo
Bedardi	"Unhen Apna Bana Lena"	Roshan	Kidar Sharma	solo
Bedardi	"Do Pyaar Ki Baaten Ho Jaayen"	Roshan	Butaram Sharma	solo
Bedardi	"Aankhon Se Poochh Lo, Jinhen Intezaar Hai"	Roshan	S. H. Bihari	solo
Bedardi	"More Tumse Ho Ho, Tore Mujhse Ho Ho Ulajh Gaye Naina"	Roshan	S. H. Bihari	solo
Dasavtaar	"O Mere Malik Bolo"	Avinash Vyas	B. P. Bharghav	solo
Dasavtaar	"Aao Nath Hamare Kab Loge Avtaar"	Avinash Vyas	B. P. Bharghav	solo
Dasavtaar	"Bajao Ram Naam Ki Taali"	Avinash Vyas	B. P. Bharghav	Badrinath Vyas
Ek Nazar	"Ek Alhad Balhad Chjori"	S. D. Burman	Rajendra Krishan	
Ek Nazar	"Bas Chupke Hi Chupke Se Pyaar Ho Gaya"	S. D. Burman	Rajendra Krishan	
Ek Tha Ladka	"Tum Jaate Ho Toh Jaao Bhale"	Rajhans Kataria	Rajesh Kumar	
Ghayal	"Dil Tod Ke Chalo Ji"	Gyan Dutt	Saraswati Kumar Deepak	G. M. Durrani, Meena Kapoor
Ghayal	"Jaane Ki Taiyariyaan"	Gyan Dutt	Saraswati Kumar Deepak	G. M. Durrani, Meena Kapoor
Ghayal	"Tera Kisi Pe Aaye Dil"	Gyan Dutt	M. L. Khanna	Meena Kapoor
Ghayal	"Armaan Mere Dil Ke, Dil Hi Mein Reh Gaye"	Gyan Dutt	M. L. Khanna	solo
Gumasta	"Mere Dil Ki Duniya Mein"	K. Dutta	Wahid Qureshi	solo
Hamari Shaan	"Hum Tumse Poochhte Hai Sach"	Chitragupt	Anjum Jaipuri	Mohammed Rafi
Hamari Shaan	"Yeh Taaron Bhari Raat Hamen Yaad Rahegi"	Chitragupt	Anjum Jaipuri	Mohammed Rafi
Hamari Shaan	"Jeene Ki Khushi, Na Marne Ki Gham"	Chitragupt	Anjum Jaipuri	solo
Hanuman Patal Vijay	"Kyun Rooth Gaye Mujhse"	S. N. Tripathi	Anjum Jaipuri	solo
Jai Mahakali	"Ae Chand Mere Chand Ko Dikhla Na Sake Tu"	Kumar	Firoz Jalandhari	solo
Jai Mahakali	"He Maiya Bhawani, He Durga Bhawani"	Kumar	Saraswati Kumar Deepak	solo
Jeevan Tara	"Ud Jaaye Baghon Mein Naache Gaaye"	Chitragupt	G S Potdar	Sulochana Kadam
Johari	"Aaj Mile Kal Bichhad Jaaye"	Pandit Harbanslal	Tejnath Zar	solo
Johari	"Chhed Gaya Hai Kaun"	Pandit Harbanslal	Tejnath Zar	solo
Johari	"Aye Dard-e-Mohabbat Tere Jahan Mein"	Pandit Harbanslal	Shola Kahamvi	solo
Kashmir	"Uth Ae Watan Ke Naujawan"	Hansraj Behl	Sharshar Sailani	Mohammed Rafi, Pramodini Desai
Lakshmi Narayan	"Phoolon Se Kar Loon Naina Chaar"	S. N. Tripathi	Ramesh Pandey	solo
Lakshmi Narayan	"Gayo Birha Ki Raat"	S. N. Tripathi	Ramesh Pandey	solo
Lakshmi Narayan	"Tera Bachpan Gaya Hai Beet"	S. N. Tripathi	Ramesh Pandey	solo
Lakshmi Narayan	"Kuchh Pyaar Kiye Jao"	S. N. Tripathi	Ramesh Pandey	solo
Lakshmi Narayan	"O Bhool Janewale"	S. N. Tripathi	Ramesh Pandey	solo
Lav Kush	"Kaahe Chakori, Hey Chand Tum Chitchor Ho"	Shankar Rao Vyas	Neelkanth Tiwari	solo
Lav Kush	"Ey Ri Laakh Yatan Kar Hari"	Shankar Rao Vyas	Ramesh Gupta	solo
Mangala	"Jhanan Jhanan Jhanwa More Bichhwa"	E. Shankar Shastri, Balakrishna Kalla	Pandit Indra Chandra	solo
Mangala	"Kabootar Aaja Re"	E. Shankar Shastri	Pandit Indra Chandra	solo
Maya Machhindra	"Chupke Chupke Jabse Hua Hai Pyaar"	Prem Nath	Neelkanth Tiwari	Surendra
Maya Machhindra	"Toot Gayo Haye Jeevan Beena"	Prem Nath	M. L. Khanna	Surendra
Maya Machhindra	"Hum Hain Veer Nariyan"	Prem Nath	M. L. Khanna	solo
Maya Machhindra	"Kore Mann Mein Jhoola Jhoole More Sanwariya"	Prem Nath	M. L. Khanna	solo
Nadaan	"Dilon Ke Melon Ka Naam Picnic"	Chic Chocolate	P. L. Santoshi	C. Ramchandra
Nakhre	"Andhiyari Kaari Raat Mein"	Hansraj Behl	Bharat Vyas	solo
Nakhre	"Jo Main Aisa Jaanti"	Hansraj Behl	Bharat Vyas	solo
Nakhre	"Humne Bhi Pyaar Kiya"	Hansraj Behl	Bharat Vyas	Lata Mangeshkar, Mohammed Rafi
Naujawan	"Panghat Pe Dekho Aayi Milan Ki Bela"	S. D. Burman	Sahir Ludhianvi	Mohammed Rafi
Naujawan	"Zara Jhoom Le, Jawani Ka Zamana Hai"	S. D. Burman	Sahir Ludhianvi	Mohammed Rafi
Pyar Ki Baaten	"Mast Chandni Jhoom Raha Hai"	Bulo C. Rani	M. L. Khanna	Mukesh
Pyar Ki Baaten	"Ek Roz Soye Zara Sambhal Sambhal Ke"	Bulo C. Rani	M. L. Khanna	Siddiqui
Pyar Ki Baaten	"Dil Ka Pehle Pehle Chot Khana"	Bulo C. Rani	M. L. Khanna	solo
Pyar Ki Baaten	"Aansoo Bahaao Tum Roz Udhar"	Bulo C. Rani	Majrooh Sultanpuri	Mukesh
Rajput	"Chhupne Ke Liye Hai, Na Chhupane Ke Liye Hai"	Hansraj Behl	Rajendra Krishan	Hamida Banu
Ram Janma	"Deh Ka Pinjara Chhod Ke"	Avinash Vyas	Ramesh Gupta	solo
Ratnadeep	"Sun Lo Ek Kahani, Tha Ek Rajkumar"	Robin Chatterjee	Mahendra Pran, Pandit Madhur	Talat Mahmood
Ratnadeep	"Jiya Hiya Dole Mere"	Robin Chatterjee	Mahendra Pran, Pandit Madhur	solo
Ratnadeep	"Aj Ki Raat Bhaag More Jaage"	Robin Chatterjee	Vidyapati	Talat Mahmood
Saagar	"Chup Chup Koi Mere Kaanon Mein Bola Re"	S. K. Pal	Narendra Sharma	solo
Saagar	"Hamein Kab Khabar Thi"	S. K. Pal	Narendra Sharma	solo
Saagar	"Honthon Pe Rahi Fariyad"	S. K. Pal	Narendra Sharma	solo
Saagar	"O Phulwa Re Tu Khil"	S. K. Pal	Narendra Sharma	solo
Saagar	"Ro Ro Kar Teri Raah Takoon"	S. K. Pal	Narendra Sharma	solo
Sansar	"Lucknow Chalo Ab Rani"	E. Shankar Shastri, M. D. Parthasarathi, B. S. Kalla	Pandit Indra	Talat Mahmood
Sansar	"Humin Ne Mohabbat Ki Duniya Basayi"	E. Shankar Shastri, M. D. Parthasarathi, B. S. Kalla	Pandit Indra	V. Sarala, P. Leela
Shabistan	"Hai Yeh Mausam-e-Bahaar, Sun Jawani Ki Pukaar"	Madan Mohan	Qamar Jalalabadi	Talat Mahmood
Shabistan	"Kaho Ek Baar, Mujhe Tumse Pyaar Hai"	C. Ramchandra	Qamar Jalalabadi	Talat Mahmood
Shabistan	"Hum Hain Tere Deewane"	C. Ramchandra	Qamar Jalalabadi	Talat Mahmood, C. Ramchandra
Shri Ganesh Janma	"Bholenath Re Naiya Paar Laganewale"	Manna Dey, Khemchand Prakash	Bharat Vyas	Manna Dey
Shri Ganesh Janma	"He Lakshminath Aaj Mere Laaj Bachao"	Manna Dey, Khemchand Prakash	Bharat Vyas	solo
Shri Ganesh Janma	"He Bholenath He Bhole Bholenath"	Manna Dey, Khemchand Prakash	Bharat Vyas	solo
Shri Ganesh Janma	"O Deepak Se Sang Jalta Patang"	Manna Dey, Khemchand Prakash	Bharat Vyas	solo
Shri Ganesh Janma	"Shivshankar Daya Karo"	Manna Dey, Khemchand Prakash	Bharat Vyas	solo
Shri Ganesh Janma	"Namoh Jai Jagadambe"	Manna Dey, Khemchand Prakash	Bharat Vyas	Sulochana Kadam
Shri Vishnu Bhagwan	"Ankhon Mein Hai Ganga Jamuna"	Avinash Vyas	Pandit Mukhram Sharma	solo
Shri Vishnu Bhagwan	"Mann Ro Kar Hunse Poochh Raha Hai"	Avinash Vyas	Pandit Mukhram Sharma	solo
Shri Vishnu Bhagwan	"Mera Mann Gaata Hai Geet"	Avinash Vyas	B. P. Bharghav	solo
Shri Vishnu Bhagwan	"Lo Piyo Lo Piyo Amrit Aaj Pilane Aayi"	Avinash Vyas	Saraswati Kumar Deepak	solo
Stage	"O Jaanewale Dil Mein Teri Yaad Reh Gayi"	Sardar Malik	Sarshar Sailani	solo

=== 1952 ===
Film	Song	Composer(s)	Writer(s)	Co-artist(s)
Aasman	"Pon Pon Pon Bajaa Bole"	O. P. Nayyar	Prem Dhawan	solo
Aasman	"Dekho Jadu Bhare"	O. P. Nayyar	Prem Dhawan	solo
Aasman	"Na Fiza Hoon Main"	O. P. Nayyar	Prem Dhawan	solo
Aasman	"Dil Hai Deewana"	O. P. Nayyar	Prem Dhawan	solo
Anand Math	"Dheere Samire Tatani Dheere"	Hemant Kumar	Mahakavi Jaydev	Hemant Kumar
Anand Math	"Jai Jagdish Hare"	Hemant Kumar		Hemant Kumar
Anand Math	"Naino Mein Sawan" (duet)	Hemant Kumar	Shailendra	Hemant Kumar
Anand Math	"Naino Mein Sawan" (female)	Hemant Kumar	Shailendra	solo
Anand Math	"Aare Bhanware Aa"	Hemant Kumar	Shailendra	solo
Anand Math	"Kaise Rokoge Aise Toofan Ko"	Hemant Kumar	Shailendra	Talat Mahmood
Anjaam	"Are O Dekhne Wale"	Madan Mohan	Qamar Jalalabadi	solo
Anjaam	"Meri Naiya Hai Majhdhaar"	Madan Mohan	Qamar Jalalabadi	solo
Anmol Sahara	"In Bheegi Aankhon Mein Ek Toote Dil Ki"	Santosh Mukherjee	B. M. Sharma	solo
Anmol Sahara	"Aaj Nache Hai Dil"	Santosh Mukherjee	B. M. Sharma	solo
Anmol Sahara	"Aaj Jiya Chahe Sitaaron Se Baat Kare"	Santosh Mukherjee	B. M. Sharma	solo
Anmol Sahara	"Deta Jaa Daan Kuchh, O Daata"	Santosh Mukherjee	B. M. Sharma	solo
Anmol Sahara	"Pyaar Ke Din Aaye Hain, Aa Pyaar Kiye Jaa"	Santosh Mukherjee	B. M. Sharma	solo
Anmol Sahara	"Jaao Jaao Na Saajan More, Jaao Na"	Santosh Mukherjee	B. M. Sharma	Rajkumar
Badnam	"Ghir Aayi Ghor Ghata"	Basant Prakash	Shailendra	solo
Badnam	"O Denewale Yeh Kya Diya Tune"	Basant Prakash	Shailendra	solo
Baghdad	"Raat Abhi Baaki Hai"	Bulo C. Rani	Raja Mehdi Ali Khan	solo
Baghdad	"Bahaaron Ne Chhede Khushi Ke Tarane"	Bulo C. Rani	Raja Mehdi Ali Khan	solo
Baghdad	"Dil Mein Gham-e-Mohabbat"	Bulo C. Rani	Raja Mehdi Ali Khan	solo
Baghdad	"Ek Shama Hai, Mehfil Mein Parwans Hazaaron Hai"	Bulo C. Rani	Raja Mehdi Ali Khan	solo
Baghdad	"Humein Thoda Thoda Pyaar Bhi Karo Ji"	Bulo C. Rani	Raja Mehdi Ali Khan	G. M. Durrani
Baghdad	"Yeh Pyaat Ki Baatein, Yeh Aaj Ki Raatein"	Bulo C. Rani	Raja Mehdi Ali Khan	G. M. Durrani, Talat Mahmood
Bewafa	"Aaja O Mere Dilfuba"	A. R. Qureshi	Shams Azimabadi	solo
Bhakta Puran	"Nainon Mein Saawan Ki Dhara"	Chitragupt	Ramesh Chandra Panday	solo
Bhakta Puran	"Aayi Poonam Ki Raat"	Chitragupt	Gopal Singh Nepali	solo
Chamkee	"Main Toh Jungle Ki Chanchal Hiraniya"	Manna Dey	Kavi Pradeep	solo
Ghungroo	"Mujhe Apns Bana, Mere Dil Mein Sama"	C. Ramchandra	Rajendra Krishan	Lata Mangeshkar
Hamari Duniya	"Woh Nafrat Se Daman Bacha Kar Chale"	Shankar Babu Pathak	Hasrat Jaipuri	solo
Hamari Duniya	"Chupke Chupke Teer Chale"	Shankar Babu Pathak	Indeevar	solo
Insan	"Mere Saajan Sanware, Huye Nain Banware"	B. N. Bali	Balwant Kapoor	solo
Insan	"So Jaa Re Dukhiyari Maa Ke Aankh Ke Taare"	B. N. Bali	Sajan Bihari	solo
Jaal	"Zor Laga Ke Haiya"	S. D. Burman	Sahir Ludhianvi	solo
Jaal	"Soch Samajh Kar"	S. D. Burman	Sahir Ludhianvi	solo
Jaal	"De Bhi Chuke Sanam"	S. D. Burman	Sahir Ludhianvi	Kishore Kumar
Jeevan Nauka	"Maata Yashoda Ke Kehne Se"	Shankar Rao Vyas	Ramesh Gupta	Manna Dey
Kafila	"Choto Chori Dil Mein Samaya"	Husnlal–Bhagatram	Moti	Talat Mahmood
Lal Kunwar	"Bachke Humse Bhala Sarkar Kahan Jaaoge"	S D Burman	Sahir Ludhianvi	Asha Bhosle
Lanka Dahan	"Meri Ang Ang Mein Ram Ram"	Hansraj Behl	S. P. Kalla	solo
Lanka Dahan	"Aaj Gagan Mein Aag Lagi Hai"	Hansraj Behl	S. P. Kalla	solo
Lanka Dahan	"Bhool Huyi Kya Mujhse Bhagwan"	Hansraj Behl	S. P. Kalla	solo
Lanka Dahan	"Tum Mujhse Shaadi Kar Lo"	Hansraj Behl	S. P. Kalla	Devendra Mohan, Krishna Goyal
Maa	"Main Na Boloon, Na Boloongi Aaj"	S. K. Pal	Bharat Vyas	solo
Maa	"Har Din Tu Rota Hai Baadal"	S. K. Pal	Bharat Vyas	solo
Mamta	"Teri Kaali Kaali Andhiyaan Kanhaiya"	Sonik	Verma Malik	solo
Mamta	"Sitaaron Hanso Na Meri Bebasi Par"	Sonik	Verma Malik	solo
Mordhwaj	"Aayi Rang Bhari"	Narayan Dutt	Bharat Vyas	solo
Mordhwaj	"Gin Gin Taare Ratiyan Bitaun"	Narayan Dutt	Bharat Vyas	solo
Mr. Sampat	"O Bairagi Banwasi, Charnon Ki Daasi"	B. S. Kalla	Pandit Indra Chandra	solo
Mr. Sampat	"Jagah Nahin, Itni Lambi Chaudi Duniya Phir"	B. S. Kalla	Pandit Indra Chandra	P. B. Srinivas
Mr. Sampat	"Hindustan Mahaan, Hamara Hindustan"	B. S. Kalla	Pandit Indra Chandra	P. B. Srinivas
Mr. Sampat	"Dil Control Ke Aaye"	B. S. Kalla	Pandit Indra Chandra	Jikki
Mr. Sampat	"Chalo Punya Bharan Ko"	B. S. Kalla	Pandit Indra Chandra	Jikki
Mr. Sampat	"Aji Hum Bharat Ki Nari"	B. S. Kalla	Pandit Indra Chandra, J. S. Kashyap	P. B. Srinivas
Mr. Sampat	"Aao Aao Kagani Suno Trepan Tresath Saal"	B. S. Kalla, E. Shankar Shastri	Pandit Indra Chandra	Jikki
Najariya	"Ae Ji Tumse Pehli Baar Hui Aanlhen Chaar"	Bhola Shreshtha	P. L. Santoshi	solo
Neelam Pari	"Ek Main, Duji Tum, Teeja Chand"	Khursheed Anwar	Hasrat Jaipuri	solo
Neelam Pari	"Kismat Ne Yeh Zulm Kiya Hai"	Khursheed Anwar	Hasrat Jaipuri	solo
Neelam Pari	"Raat Chandni Kare Ishaare"	Khursheed Anwar	Hasrat Jaipuri	solo
Neelam Pari	"Jab Tak Chamke Chand Sitare"	Khursheed Anwar	Hasrat Jaipuri	G. M. Durrani
Neelam Pari	"Chahe Kismat Humko Rulaaye"	Khursheed Anwar	Hasrat Jaipuri	Mohammed Rafi
Neelam Pari	"Chham Chham Chham Chham, Dono Saath Rahen Hardam"	Khursheed Anwar	Hasrat Jaipuri	Asha Bhosle
Neelam Pari	"Sapnon Mein Aaanewale Balam"	Khursheed Anwar	Hasrat Jaipuri	Asha Bhosle
Nirmal	"Mere Nainon Mein Jal Bhar Aaye"	Bulo C. Rani	Moti	solo
Nirmal	"Bhanwara Bada Deewana"	Bulo C. Rani	Moti	solo
Nirmal	"Thi Air Ek Mulakaat"	Bulo C. Rani	Moti	solo
Nirmal	"Tu Jo Mere Pyaar Ki Khichdi Pakayega"	Bulo C. Rani	Moti	G. M. Durrani
Nirmal	"Meri Kya Hai Khata, Yeh Bata De"	Bulo C. Rani	Moti	Shyam Kumar
Nishan Danka	"Shaam Suhani Nadi Ke Kinare"	Basant Prakash	S. H. Bihari	Talat Mahmood
Nishan Danka	"Yeh Chheda Hai Kisne Mere Dil Ke Taar"	Basant Prakash	S. H. Bihari	solo
Nishan Danka	"Kisi Ke Pyaar Ko Hans Hans Ke Thukraba Achchha Nahin"	Basant Prakash	Hasrat Jaipuri	solo
Parbat	"Pyaar Bhari In Aankhon Ne Aaj Tujhko Yaad Kiya"	Shankar–Jaikishan	Hasrat Jaipuri	Lata Mangeshkar
Parbat	"Kya Bataoon, Mohabbat Hai Kya"	Shankar–Jaikishan	Shailendra	Lata Mangeshkar, Mohammed Rafi
Patal Bhairavi	"Jaoongi Maike Jaoongi"	Ghantasala	Pandit Indra	G. M. Durrani
Patal Bhairavi	"Kahin Preet Se Bhari Koi Geet Gaa Raha"	Ghantasala	Pandit Indra	Talat Mahmood
Patal Bhairavi	"Goonjat Bhanwra, Jhoomat Kaliyan"	Ghantasala	Pandit Indra	solo
Patal Bhairavi	"Tan Man Mera Tarse, Kyun Tarse"	Ghantasala	Pandit Indra	solo
Patal Bhairavi	"Sun Re Rani, Meri Kahani"	Ghantasala	Pandit Indra	solo
Rajrani Damayanti	"Mohe Bairaan Nindiya Laagi Re"	Avinash Vyas	Devendra Mohan	solo
Rangeeli	"Humne Yeh Dil Ke Lagane Ki Sazaa Paayi Hai"	Chic Chocolate	Raja Mehdi Ali Khan	solo
Rangeeli	"Raat Bhi Rangeen Hai, Mauka Bhi Haseen Hai"	Chic Chocolate	Raja Mehdi Ali Khan	solo
Sangdil	"Dharti Se Door Gore Baadalon Ke Paar"	Sajjad Hussain	Rajendra Krishan	Asha Bhosle
Sangdil	"Darshan Pyaasi Aai Daasi"	Sajjad Hussain	Rajendra Krishan	solo
Sapna	"Door Nagariya Tori Ho O Umraoo Balma Re"	Shyam Babu Pathak	Bharat Vyas	Shamshad Begum
Sapna	"Ae Kaari Koyaliya Ab Kaahe Ko Kuku Kuhu Kook Rahi"	Shyam Babu Pathak	Bharat Vyas	solo
Saqi	"Haseena Sambhal Sambhal Kar Chal"	C. Ramchandra	Rajendra Krishan	C. Ramchandra
Shiv Shakti	"Sun Damru Ki Dhun"	Avinash Vyas	Munshi Sagar Hussain	solo
Shiv Shakti	"Naina More Bhaaye Banware"	Avinash Vyas	Munshi Sagar Hussain	solo
Shiv Shakti	"Neel Kanth Nahin Aaye"	Avinash Vyas	Munshi Sagar Hussain	solo
Shiv Shakti	"Ho Haiya Mere Man Mein Ang Jaagi"	Avinash Vyas	Munshi Sagar Hussain	solo
Shiv Shakti	"Ghumi Jaaye Re Ghatmal"	Avinash Vyas	Munshi Sagar Hussain	Batuk Desai, R. P. Sharma
Shrimatiji	"Teri Chahat Mein Mit Gaye Hum Teri Kasam"	Jimmy	Shailendra	solo
Shrimatiji	"Tadeer Ne Loota Mujhe"	Jimmy	Hasrat Jaipuri	solo
Shrimatiji	"Do Naina Tumhare Pyare Pyare"	S. Mohinder	Raja Mehdi Ali Khan	Hemant Kumar
Tamasha	"Raat Mohe Mitha Mitha Sapna Aaya Re"	Manna Dey	Bharat Vyas	solo
Tarang	"Nadiya Kinare Mora Dera"	Chitragupt	Rammurti Chaturvedi	Shamshad Begum, Mohammed Rafi
Tarang	"Badi Mushkil Se Aisi Shaam Aayi Hai"	Chitragupt	D. N. Madhok	Mohammed Rafi
Tarang	"Mere Dil Mein Laakh Hai Baatein"	Chitragupt	I. C. Kapoor	
Tarang	"Leke Pehlu Mein Armaan Saare"	Chitragupt	I. C. Kapoor	
Usha Kiron	"Jaago Bhor Suhani Aayi"	Hanuman Prasad Triloki	Kamil Rashid	Asha Bhosle, Zohrabai Ambalewali, G. M. Durrani
Usha Kiron	"Chhin Jaaye Na Ankhon Se Mere"	Hanuman Prasad Triloki	Anjum Pilibhiti	solo
Veer Arjun	"Naach Naach Naach Man Mor Magan Ho"	Avinash Vyas	Ramesh Gupta	solo
Zalzala	"Kabhi Inko Chahen Kabhi Unko"	Pankaj Mullick	Vrajendra Gaur	solo
Zalzala	"O Duniyawalon, Pyaar Mein Thokar Khaana"	Pankaj Mullick	Vrajendra Gaur	solo
Zalzala	"Jaanewale De Gaya Hai Yaad Ko Saugat Mein"	Pankaj Mullick	Vrajendra Gaur	solo
Zalzala	"Boojho Boojho Ae Dilwalo"	Pankaj Mullick	Uddhav Kumar	solo
Zalzala	"Mujhe Woh Dekh Kar Jab Muskurayenge"	Pankaj Mullick	Ali Sardar Jafri	solo
Zamane Ki Hawa	"O Jagwale Dekh Liya Jag Tera"	Aziz Khan	Sagar Badayuni	solo

=== 1953 ===
Film	Song	Composer(s)	Writer(s)	Co-artist(s)
Anarkali	"Aa Jaan-e-Wafa"	Basant Prakash	Jan Nisar Akhtar	solo
Armaan	"Yeh Hansi Yeh Khushi Laakho Baras"	S. D. Burman	Sahir Ludhianvi	solo
Armaan	"Jaadu Bhari Yeh Fizaayen Kehti Hain Aaja"	S. D. Burman	Sahir Ludhianvi	solo
Baaz	"Majhi Albele"	O. P. Nayyar	Majrooh Sultanpuri	solo
Baaz	"Zara Samne Aa"	O. P. Nayyar	Majrooh Sultanpuri	solo
Baaz	"Ae Dil, Ae Deewane"	O. P. Nayyar	Majrooh Sultanpuri	solo
Baaz	"Tare Chandni Afsane"	O. P. Nayyar	Majrooh Sultanpuri	solo
Baaz	"Jago Jago Savera Hua"	O. P. Nayyar	Majrooh Sultanpuri	solo
Baaz	"Ae Watan Ke Naujawan"	O. P. Nayyar	Majrooh Sultanpuri	solo
Bahu Beti	"Najdik Na Aana, Na Mujhe Haath Lagaana"	S. D. Batish	Kaifi Azmi	S. D. Batish
Bahu Beti	"Mohse Chanchal Jawani Sambhalo Nahin Jaaye"	S. D. Batish	Kaifi Azmi	solo
Bahu Beti	"Kar Ke Ho, Kar Ke Ha, Kahe Bol"	S. D. Batish	Kaifi Azmi	solo
Bahu Beti	"Kaise Le Aaun Rakhiyan, Main Bhaiyan"	S. D. Batish	Kaifi Azmi	solo
Bahu Beti	"Gori Dulhaniya, Mori Gori Dulhaniya"	S. D. Batish	Kaifi Azmi	solo
Bahu Beti	"Ghumak Ghumak Kora Baaje Ghungharva"	S. D. Batish	Kaifi Azmi	solo
Bahu Beti	"Dil Jala, Yaadein Jali, Ek Ek Tamanna Jal Gayi"	S. D. Batish	Kaifi Azmi	solo
Dana Pani	"Tere Haathon Mein Jeevan Ki Jeet Haar" (version 1)	Mohan Junior	Kaif Irfani	Mohammed Rafi
Firdaus	"Chandni Raat Hai Aise Mein Aake Mil"	Robin Chatterjee	D. N. Madhok	solo
Firdaus	"Kalam Dawat Mori Saswa Ne Rakh Di"	Robin Chatterjee	D. N. Madhok	solo
Hamdard	"Aa Sapnein Tujhe Bulaaye Aa Jaa"	Anil Biswas	Prem Dhawan	solo
Humsafar	"O Ji Aankhonwaalo, Dekho Dekho"	Ustad Ali Akbar Khan	Sahir Ludhianvi	solo
Humsafar	"Mat Karo Kisise Pyaar"	Ustad Ali Akbar Khan	Sahir Ludhianvi	solo
Humsafar	"Haseen Chandni, Bheegi Bheegi Hawayen"	Ustad Ali Akbar Khan	Sahir Ludhianvi	solo
Husn Ka Chor	"O Duniyawale Bataa"	Bulo C. Rani	Raja Mehdi Ali Khan	Mohammed Rafi
Jeevan Jyoti	"Mann Sheetal Naina Suphal"	S. D. Burman	Sahir Ludhianvi	solo
Jeevan Jyoti	"So Jaa Re So Jaa Mere Akhiyon Ke Taare"	S. D. Burman	Sahir Ludhianvi	solo
Jeevan Jyoti	"O Lag Gain Akhiyan Tumse Mori"	S. D. Burman	Sahir Ludhianvi	Mohammed Rafi
Ladki	"Ae Aankh Ro Ke Likh De"	C. Ramchandra	Rajendra Krishan	solo
Ladki	"Baat Chhalat Nai Chunri Rang Daraat"	R. Sudarshanam, Dhaniram	Rajendra Krishan	solo
Ladki	"Kasam Teri Mohabbat Ki"	R. Sudarshanam, Dhaniram	Rajendra Krishan	solo
Ladki	"Man Mor Machave Shor"	R. Sudarshanam, Dhaniram	Rajendra Krishan	Lata Mangeshkar
Manchala	"Yeh Duniya Paagalkhana"	Chitragupt	Raja Mehdi Ali Khan	solo
Naina	"Dil Unko De Diya Hai"	Ghulam Mohammad	Anjum Jaipuri	solo
Naina	"Sunaayen Kise Apna Gham Ka Fasana"	Ghulam Mohammad	Anjum Jaipuri	solo
Nav Durga	"Aaye Biraha Ke Raat"	S. N. Tripathi	Anjum Jaipuri	solo
Nav Durga	"Ek Aag Laga Kar Chupke Se"	S. N. Tripathi	Anjum Jaipuri	solo
Nav Durga	"Sakhi Ri Mera Mann Naache"	S. N. Tripathi	Anjum Jaipuri	solo
Nav Durga	"Chham Chham Naache Nere Nainon Mein Pyaar"	S. N. Tripathi	Anjum Jaipuri	Mohammed Rafi
Nav Durga	"Hum Aur Tum Mil Gaye Toh Khil Gayi"	S. N. Tripathi	Ramesh Chandra Panday	Mohammed Rafi
Nav Durga	"Aayi Bahaar, Kiye Solah Singaar"	S. N. Tripathi	Ramesh Chandra Panday	Laxmi Bai
Naya Raasta	"Kya Chhup Gaya Bhagwan"	Chitragupt	Saraswati Kumar Deepak	solo
Parineeta	"Chand Hai Wohi"	Arun Mukherjee	Bharat Vyas	solo
Pehli Shaadi	"Tum Haan Keh Do Main Jee Jaoon"	Robin Chatterjee	D. N. Madhok	G. M. Durrani
Raj Ratan	"Mere Dil Ki Ho Gayi Chori"	Ninu Majundar	Bharat Vyas	solo
Raj Ratan	"Phir Ghata Ghir Rahi"	Ninu Majundar	Bharat Vyas	solo
Raj Ratan	"Rang Birangi Naariyon Ke Rang Dekh Lo"	Ninu Majundar	Bharat Vyas	solo
Rami Dhoban	"Main Prem Deewani, Piya Milan Chali"	Hiren Bose	Rammurti Chaturvedi	solo
Rami Dhoban	"Jag Kya Banaya Tha"	Hiren Bose	Rammurti Chaturvedi	solo
Rami Dhoban	"Sakhi Ri Mori Tike Na Najariya"	Hiren Bose	Rammurti Chaturvedi	solo
Rami Dhoban	"Kaanan More Shyam Rang Ghole"	Hiren Bose	Rammurti Chaturvedi	Hemant Kumar
Rami Dhoban	"Sun Sun Maanush Bhai" (duet)	Hiren Bose	Rammurti Chaturvedi	Hemant Kumar
Rami Dhoban	"Piya In Charanan Bali Jaoon"	Hiren Bose	Rammurti Chaturvedi	Hemant Kumar
Rami Dhoban	"Sau Baras Par Preetam Aaye Ghar"	Hiren Bose	Rammurti Chaturvedi	Hemant Kumar
Rami Dhoban	"Duniya Gol Hai"	Hiren Bose	Rammurti Chaturvedi	Shankar Dasgupta
Shagufa	"Maine Lakhon Ke Bol"	C. Ramchandra	Rajendra Krishan	Sunder
Shagufa	"Dil Kabhi Apna Tha Lekin"	C. Ramchandra	Rajendra Krishan	Sunder
Shagufa	"Meri Behki Behki Chaal"	C. Ramchandra	Rajendra Krishan	solo
Shahenshah	"Le Le Dil To Le Le Qismat"	S. D. Burman	Sahir Ludhianvi	solo
Shole	"Socha Hai Sahenge Door Se Gham"	Dhaniram	Majrooh Sultanpuri	solo
Shole	"Mera Dil Kabhi Roye Kabhi Gaaye"	Dhaniram	Kamil Rashid	solo
Shole	"Nigahen Mila"	Dhaniram	Sahir Ludhianvi	Hemant Kumar
Shuk Rambha	"Mere Baalon Mein Sawan Ki Ghata"	Manna Dey	Bharat Vyas	solo
Suhaag Sindoor	"Sakhi Saajan Ne Mujhko"	Sailesh Mukherjee	Suresh Tripathi	solo
Suhaag Sindoor	"Gori Rakhna Sambhal"	Sailesh Mukherjee	Saraswati Kumar Deepak	solo
Suhaag Sindoor	"Mere Laadle Balam"	Suresh Kumar	Bharat Vyas	Sailesh Mukherjee
Teen Batti Chaar Raasta	"Bengali Sindhi Gujarati Marathi Punjabi Song"	Shivram Krishnan, Avinash Vyas, Vasant Desai, Kanu Ghosh	P. L. Santoshi, Kanu Ghosh, Ram Punjwani	Asha Bhosle, Lata Mangeshkar, Zohrabai Ambalewali, S. Balbir

=== 1954 ===
Film	Song	Composer(s)	Writer(s)	Co-artist(s)
Aar Paar	"Mohabbat Kar Lo, Ji Bhar Lo"	O. P. Nayyar	Majrooh Sultanpuri	Mohammed Rafi, Suman Kalyanpur
Aar Paar	"Arey, Na Na Na, Tauba Tauba"	O. P. Nayyar	Majrooh Sultanpuri	Mohammed Rafi
Aar Paar	"Sun Sun, Sun Sun Zalima"	O. P. Nayyar	Majrooh Sultanpuri	Mohammed Rafi
Aar Paar	"Ja Ja Ja Ja Bewafa"	O. P. Nayyar	Majrooh Sultanpuri	solo
Aar Paar	"Babuji Dheere Chalna"	O. P. Nayyar	Majrooh Sultanpuri	solo
Aar Paar	"Ye Lo Main Haari Piya"	O. P. Nayyar	Majrooh Sultanpuri	solo
Aar Paar	"Hoon Abhi Main Jawan"	O. P. Nayyar	Majrooh Sultanpuri	solo
Adhikar	"Kamata Hoon Bahut Kuchh"	Avinash Vyas	Raja Mehdi Ali Khan	Kishore Kumar
Amar Kirtan	"Hari Om Tat Sat" (version 1)	S. D. Batish	Wali Saheb	solo
Amar Kirtan	"Mere Ghar Shyam Aata Nahin"	S. D. Batish	Wali Saheb	solo
Baadbaan	"Har Roz Kaha, Har Roz Suna"	Timir Baran	S. K. Pal, Indeevar	solo
Baadbaan	"Kaise Koi Jiye, Zehar Hia Zindagi" (female)	Timir Baran	S. K. Pal, Indeevar	solo
Dost	"Sharaab-e-Ishq Jaati Hai Pilaye"	Hansraj Behl	Butaram Sharma	Lata Mangeshkar
Ferry	"Na Ro Ae Ronewale"	Hemant Kumar	Rajendra Krishan	solo
Ferry	"Rangeeli Rangeeli Chhabili Rani Nindiya"	Hemant Kumar	Rajendra Krishan	solo
Haar Jeet	"Jaanewale Tod Ke D Ko Na Jaa"	S. D. Batish	Shewan Rizvi	solo
Haar Jeet	"Bechain Hain He He, Betaab Hain Ho Ho"	S. D. Batish	Aziz Kashmiri	Mubarak Begum
Khushboo	"Aurat Ki Zindagi Re"	Shankarlal Pardesi	Gopal Singh Nepali	solo
Khushboo	"Ek Ladka Ghar Se Nikal Gaya"	Shankarlal Pardesi	Gopal Singh Nepali	Mohammed Rafi
Lakeeren	"Tujhse Shikwa Kiya Nahin Jaata"	Hafiz Khan	Shewan Rizvi	solo
Lakeeren	"Aabad Jahaan Barbaad Kiya"	Hafiz Khan	Shewan Rizvi	solo
Lakeeren	"Daaman Na Chhuda, Yun Door Na Kar"	Hafiz Khan	Shewan Rizvi	solo
Lakeeren	"Mohabbat Ki Duniya Mein Barbad Rehna"	Hafiz Khan	Shewan Rizvi	Talat Mahmood
Lakeeren	"Nimbua Pe Papiha Bola"	Hafiz Khan	Shewan Rizvi	Shamshad Begum
Lal Pari	"Aankhon Se Paimaane Pee"	Hansraj Behl	Asad Bhopali	solo
Lal Pari	"Main Jannat Ki Hoor Hoon"	Hansraj Behl	Asad Bhopali	solo
Lal Pari	"Keh Rahi Hai Dhadkane"	Hansraj Behl	Asad Bhopali	Talat Mahmud
Maha Pooja	"Hazaar Haathwale Mandir Ke Dwaar Khule"	Avinash Vyas	Ramesh Gupta	Talat Mahmood
Maha Pooja	"Dukh Ke Din Nahin Beete Saanwariya"	Shankar Rao Vyas	Ramesh Gupta	solo
Miss Mala	"Dekho Na Humein Maare Guroor Ke"	Chitragupt	Raja Mehdi Ali Khan	Kishore Kumar
Miss Mala	"Naachti Jhoomti Muskurati Aa Gayi"	Chitragupt	Raja Mehdi Ali Khan	Kishore Kumar
Miss Mala	"Do Dil Jab Chupke Chupke Nain Milaye"	Chitragupt	Raja Mehdi Ali Khan	Kishore Kumar
Naukri	"Khoome Re Kaali Bhanwra"	Salil Chowdhury	Shailendra	solo
Prisoner of Golconda	"Bahar Jaanewale Hain, Mere Ho Jaanewale Hain"	Datta Davjekar, Jagannath	Prakash Saathi	solo
Prisoner of Golconda	"O Maalik Kya Rang Dikhaye"	Datta Davjekar, Jagannath	Prakash Saathi, Kaif Irfani	solo
Radha Krishna	"Tum Bansi Ho, Main Taan"	S. D. Burman	Sahir Ludhianvi	Lata Mangeshkar
Samaj	"Aa Birna More Rakhi Bandhoon"	Arun Kumar Mukherjee	Majrooh Sultanpuri	Shankar Dasgupta
Samrat	"Gora Bhi Achchha, Kaala Bhi Achchha"	Hemant Kumar	Rajendra Krishan	solo
Samrat	"Do Ghadi Saath Tere"	Hemant Kumar	Rajendra Krishan	solo
Sangam	"Raat Hai Armaan Bhari"	Ram Ganguly	Hasrat Jaipuri	Talat Mahmood
Sangam	"Aaye Toh Kaise Aaye Majboor Kar Diya"	Ram Ganguly	Hasrat Jaipuri	Talat Mahmood
Savdhan	"Raat Muskurati Hai Dhadkanen Jagati Hai"	Vasant Pawar	Ramchandra Vadhavkar, Sahir Ludhianvi	Asha Bhosle
Shart	"Na Yeh Chand Hoga"	Hemant Kumar	S. H. Bihari	solo
Shart	"Chand Ghatne Laga"	Hemant Kumar	S. H. Bihari	solo
Sheeshe Ki Deewar	"Ae Dil Beqaraar, Tu Aur Na Beqaraar Kar"	Shankar Dasgupta	Manmohan Sabir	Shankar Dasgupta, Madhubala Zaveri
Shobha	"Jiya Maane Na"	Robin Chatterjee	Mahendra Pran	solo
Suhagan	"Paani Ka Bulbula Yeh Zindagani"	Vasant Pawar	Ram Bhadavkar, Saraswati Kumar Deepak	solo
Toofan	"Kadam Mere Dagmaga Rahe Hai"	S. D. Batish	Gafil Harnalvi	solo
Toofan	"Mohabbat Ka Nagma Hai Dilkash Tarana"	S. D. Batish	Wahid Qureshi	solo
Toote Khilone	"Ae Roothi Huyi Taqdeer Bataa"	Chitragupt	Raja Mehdi Ali Khan	solo
Toote Khilone	"Ek Baar Bhoolti Hoon Toh"	Chitragupt	Raja Mehdi Ali Khan	solo
Toote Khilone	"Nanhe So Jaa Re"	Chitragupt	Raja Mehdi Ali Khan	solo

=== 1955 ===
Film	Song	Composer(s)	Writer(s)	Co-artist(s)
Abe–Hayat	"Jhuki Jhuki Jaye Nazar Sharmaye"	Sardar Malik	Hasrat Jaipuri	solo
Abe–Hayat	"Mara Re Mara Re Wo Mara Aankhe Katar"	Sardar Malik	Hasrat Jaipuri	solo
Abe–Hayat	"O Mera Dil O Meri Jaan"	Sardar Malik	Hasrat Jaipuri	solo
Alladin Ka Beta	"Bada Rangeen Fasana Hai"	S. Mohinder	Tanvir Naqvi	Asha Bhosle
Amaanat	"Baanki Adaayen, Dekhna Ji Dekhna"	Salil Chowdhury	Shailendra	solo
Amaanat	"Jab Se Mili Tose Ankhiyan"	Salil Chowdhury	Shailendra	solo
Bahu	"Dekho Dekho Ji Balam Deke Birha Ka Gham"	Hemant Kumar	S. H. Bihari	Talat Mahmood
Bahu	"Thandi Hawaon Mein, Taaron Ki Chhaon Mein"	Hemant Kumar	S. H. Bihari	Talat Mahmood
Bahu	"Le Tere Muqaddar Ka Tujhe Haal Bata Doon"	Hemant Kumar	S. H. Bihari	solo
Bahu	"Naina Chaar Karke Zara Humse Pyaar Kar Le"	Hemant Kumar	S. H. Bihari	solo
Bhagwat Mahima	"Har Dukh Ka Savera Hai"	Hemant Kumar	Pandit Madhur	solo
Darbar	"Dupatta Mera Dhalak Gaya Sar Se"	Hansraj Behl	Asad Bhopali	solo
Darbar	"Hum Kyun Rote Hain Raaton Ko"	Hansraj Behl	Asad Bhopali	solo
Darbar	"Yunhi Aankhon Hi Aankhon Mein"	Hansraj Behl	Asad Bhopali	solo
Darbar	"Kya Paaya Duniya Ne"	Hansraj Behl	Asad Bhopali, Pren Dhawan	Talat Mahmud
Devdas	"Aan Milo Shyam Saanwre"	S. D. Burman	Sahir Ludhianvi	Manna Dey
Devdas	"Saajan Ki Ho Gayi Gori"	S. D. Burman	Sahir Ludhianvi	Manna Dey
Do Dulhe	"Chadhoongi Adalat, Katoongi Jurmana"	B. S. Kalla	Pandit Indra Chandra	solo
Do Dulhe	"Cham Cham Chamke Bindiya"	B. S. Kalla	Pandit Indra Chandra	solo
Do Dulhe	"Main Bhi Jawaan Hoon, Tum Bhi Jawaan Ho"	B. S. Kalla	Pandit Indra Chandra	Mohammed Rafi
Do Dulhe	"Mere Dulha Shehar Se Aaya Re"	B. S. Kalla	Pandit Indra Chandra	Mohammed Rafi, Sarla Devi
Ekadashi	"Jahan Hai Kadam Kadam Par Paap"	Avinash Vyas	B. C. Madhur	solo
Ekadashi	"Kahan Dhoondhta Ram Pagle"	Avinash Vyas	B. C. Madhur	Hemant Kumar
Faraar	"Ek Raat Ki Yeh Preet"	Anil Biswas	Prem Dhawan	solo
Faraar	"Jee Bhar Ke Pyar Kar Lo"	Anil Biswas	Prem Dhawan	solo
Faraar	"Dil Chura Loon, Chura Loon Dil Mein Chhupi Baat"	Anil Biswas	Prem Dhawan	solo
Faraar	"Har Ek Nazar Idhar Udhar Hai"	Anil Biswas	Prem Dhawan	solo
Ganga Maiya	"Har Har Shiv Bam Bam Bhole"	Shankar Rao Vyas	Ramesh Chandra Panday	Mohammed Rafi
Jagadguru Shankaracharya	"Meri Gaagar Mein Sagar Hai Roop Ka"	Avinash Vyas	Bharat Vyas	solo
Jagadguru Shankaracharya	"Navtar Magar Murlidhar" (version 1)	Avinash Vyas	Bharat Vyas	Pinakin Shah
Jagadguru Shankaracharya	"Navtar Magar Murlidhar" (version 2)	Avinash Vyas	Bharat Vyas	Pinakin Shah
Kanchan	"Chhoti Si Ek Bagiya Mein"	Ghulam Mohammad	Rajendra Krishan	solo
Kanchan	"Yeh Kaisi Dillagi Hai"	Ghulam Mohammad	Rajendra Krishan	solo
Kanchan	"Mil Gaye Tum Jab Humein"	Ghulam Mohammad	Rajendra Krishan	solo
Kundan	"Meri Jaan Gair Ko Tum Paan Khilaya Na Karo"	Ghulam Mohammad	Shakeel Badayuni	Mohammed Rafi
Madhur Milan	"Ek Taraf Joru Ne Nikala Hai Diwala"	Bulo C. Rani	Raja Mehdi Ali Khan	Mohammed Rafi, Mahendra Kapoor, A. R. Oza
Milap	"Bachana Zara Yeh Zamana Hai Bura"	N. Dutta	Sahir Ludhianvi	Mohammed Rafi
Milap	"Jaate Ho To Jao Par Jaoge Kahan"	N. Dutta	Sahir Ludhianvi	solo
Milap	"Chahe Bhi Jo Dil Jana Na Wahan"	N. Dutta	Sahir Ludhianvi	solo
Milap	"Humse Bhi Kar Lo Kabhi"	N. Dutta	Sahir Ludhianvi	solo
Miss Coca Cola	"Sach Sach Bol"	O. P. Nayyar	Majrooh Sultanpuri	solo
Miss Coca Cola	"Ban Dhadkan Kajrare"	O. P. Nayyar	Majrooh Sultanpuri	solo
Miss Coca Cola	"Teri Kafir Nigah Kar Gayi"	O. P. Nayyar	Majrooh Sultanpuri	solo
Mr. & Mrs. '55	"Chal Diye Banda Nawaz"	O. P. Nayyar	Majrooh Sultanpuri	Mohammed Rafi
Mr. & Mrs. '55	"Udhar Tum Haseen Ho"	O. P. Nayyar	Majrooh Sultanpuri	Mohammed Rafi
Mr. & Mrs. '55	"Jaane Kahan Mera Jigar Gaya Ji"	O. P. Nayyar	Majrooh Sultanpuri	Mohammed Rafi
Mr. & Mrs. '55	"Neele Aasmani"	O. P. Nayyar	Majrooh Sultanpuri	solo
Mr. & Mrs. '55	"Preetam Aan Milo" (Solo)	O. P. Nayyar	Majrooh Sultanpuri	solo
Mr. & Mrs. '55	"Preetam Aan Milo" (Duet)	O. P. Nayyar	Majrooh Sultanpuri	C. H. Atma
Mr. & Mrs. '55	"Thandi Hawa, Kaali Ghata"	O. P. Nayyar	Majrooh Sultanpuri	Shamshad Begum
Munimji	"Anari Anari Re"	S. D. Burman	Shailendra	solo
Munimji	"Zindagi Hai Zinda"	S. D. Burman	Sahir Ludhianvi	solo
Munimji	"Dil Ki Umaangen Hain Jawaan"	S. D. Burman	Sahir Ludhianvi	Hemant Kumar, Thakur
Musafir Khana	"Achchha Ji Maaf Kar Do"	O. P. Nayyar	Majrooh Sultanpuri	Mohammed Rafi
Musafir Khana	"Dil De Dala, De Dala Nazrana"	O. P. Nayyar	Majrooh Sultanpuri	solo
Oot Patang	"Jhanak Jhanak Baaje Paayal Tori"	Vinod	D. N. Madhok	Sudha Malhotra
Patit Pawan	"Jhalak Teri Chhaa Gayi, Nazar Mein Sama Gayi"	Jamal Sen	Bharat Vyas	solo
Raj Darbar	"Haye Re Zamaane, Sun Dard Bhare Afsaane"	Chitragupt	Shyam Hindi	solo
Riyasat	"Aisi Nazrein Na Daal, Kar Le Khayal"	Avinash Vyas	Prem Dhawan	Mohammed Rafi
Riyasat	"Aaye Ji Aaye Din Pyaare Pyaare Aaye"	Avinash Vyas	Prem Dhawan	Madhubala Zaveri
Riyasat	"Nacho Rumjhum, Nacho Dhinak Dhin Dhin"	Avinash Vyas	Prem Dhawan	solo
Riyasat	"So Bhi Jaao Mere Armaanon"	Avinash Vyas	Prem Dhawan	solo
Sardaar	"Barkha Ki Raat Mein"	Jagmohan Mitra	Uddhav Kumar	solo
Sau Ka Note	"Chalo Chlao Rani, Karo Na Manmami"	S. Mohinder	Majrooh Sultanpuri	Mohammed Rafi
Shahzada	"Mera Pyaar Hai Ajab"	S. Mohinder	Tanvir Naqvi	solo
Shiv-Bhakta	"Jo Naari Tujhe Bhakti Se Pukarti"	Chitragupt	Gopal Singh Nepali	solo
Shri Ganesh Vivah	"Laakh Bichhaye Jaal Magar"	Chitragupt	Bharat Vyas	solo
Society	"Samajh Gaye Hum Toh"	S. D. Burman	Sahir Ludhianvi	solo
Society	"Dil Ka Taraana Gaa Le"	S. D. Burman	Sahir Ludhianvi	solo
Society	"Raham Kabhi Toh Farmaao"	S. D. Burman	Sahir Ludhianvi	Mohammed Rafi
Son of Arabia	"Na Jaoon Idhar, Na Jaoon Udjar"	Shardul Kwatra	Prem Dhawan	Shaminder
Son of Arabia	"Jhoom Le, Gaa Le, Khushiyan Manaa Le"	Shardul Kwatra	Prem Dhawan	Shaminder
Son of Arabia	"Yeh Shokh Ada, Yeh Mast Nigaah"	Shardul Kwatra	Prem Dhawan	Shaminder
Son of Arabia	"Aise Na Ghoor Ghoor Kar Dekh Hamein Deewane"	Shardul Kwatra	Prem Dhawan	Mohammed Rafi
Son of Arabia	"Nazar Ka Teer Chale, Koi Na Tadbeer Chale"	Shardul Kwatra	Prem Dhawan	solo
Son of Arabia	"Sanam Tu Aaja, Balam Tu Aaja"	Shardul Kwatra	Prem Dhawan	solo
Son of Arabia	"Tinak Tin Teena, Dil Mera Chheena"	Shardul Kwatra	Prem Dhawan	solo
Tangawali	"Teena Tan Ta Teena, Kisise Dil Hai Chheena"	Salil Chowdhury	Prem Dhawan	Manna Dey
Tatar Ka Chor	"Mast Nazar Je Paimane Chhalke"	Khayyam	Prem Dhawan	solo
Teen Bhai	"Babu Re Babu, Zara Dil Pe Karna Kaabu"	Arun Kumar Mukherjee	Bharat Vyas	solo
Teen Bhai	"Jaan Gayi Hoon, Pehchan Gayi Hoon"	Arun Kumar Mukherjee	Bharat Vyas	solo
Teen Bhai	"Duniya Se Doir Tere Bangle Mein"	Arun Kumar Mukherjee	Bharat Vyas	solo
Tismar Khan	"Jaa Jaa Chhod De Balaam"	Shardul Kwatra	Prem Dhawan	solo
Tismar Khan	"Aankhon Me Paine Zara Pee Le"	Shardul Kwatra	Prem Dhawan	solo
Tismar Khan	"Le Lo Ji, Le Lo Dil"	Shardul Kwatra	Prem Dhawan	Shaminder Pal

=== 1956 ===
Film	Song	Composer(s)	Writer(s)	Co-artist(s)
Aabroo	"Ae Phool Khushi Mein Jhoom"	Bulo C. Rani	D. N. Madhok	solo
Arab Ka Saudagar	"Do Ghadi Ki Bahaar Hai"	Hemant Kumar	S. H. Bihari	solo
Arab Ka Saudagar	"Mohabbat Ka Nateeja Humne"	Hemant Kumar	S. H. Bihari	solo
Awara Shahzadi	"Naach Rahi, Naach Rahi Champakali"	Jimmy	Khawar Zaman	solo
Awara Shahzadi	"Hum Tumse Raazi, Tum Hunse Raazi"	Jimmy	Khawar Zaman	G. M. Durrani
Ayodhyapati	"Main Janam Janam Ki Daasi Re"	Ravi	Saraswati Kumar Deepak	solo
Badal Aur Bijlee	"Mere Saiyan Mori Baiyan Chhodo Ji"	Bipin Babul	Anjum Jaipuri	solo
Badal Aur Bijlee	"Mushil Hai Ae Dil Jeene Ki Raahen"	Bipin Babul	Anjum Jaipuri	solo
Badshah Salamat	"Dil Ke Darwaze Pe Hui Khatakhat"	Bulo C. Rani	P. L. Santoshi	G. M. Durrani
Badshah Salamat	"Zara Dekh Idhar Meri Ankhon Ka Rang"	Bulo C. Rani	P. L. Santoshi	Mohammed Rafi
Baghi Sardar	"Aa Nazara Le Le, Hamara Dil Le Ke"	B. N. Bali	Khalish Lakhnavi	solo
Baghi Sardar	"Nayi Naveli Preet Huyi Re, Kahin Chhod Na Dena"	B. N. Bali	Aziz Kashmiri	solo
Baghi Sardar	"Zindagi Fasana Hai, Beraham Zamana Hai"	B. N. Bali	S. H. Bihari	solo
Baghi Sardar	"Meri Nehfil Mein Hai Bheed Lagi"	B. N. Bali	Bharat Vyas	Satish Batra
Basre Ki Hoor	"Jane Kaise Kaise Ho Ji Tum"	Chitragupt	Shewan Rizvi	solo
Basre Ki Hoor	"Main Hoon Gypsy"	Chitragupt	Shewan Rizvi	solo
Bhagam Bhag	"Darshan Kab Doge Bolo Na Manohar Saiyan"	O. P. Nayyar	Majrooh Sultanpuri	Mohammed Rafi
Bhai Bhai	"Ae Dil Mujhe Bata De"	Madan Mohan	Rajendra Krishan	solo
C.I.D.	"Ae Dil Hai Mushkil"	O. P. Nayyar	Majrooh Sultanpuri	Mohammad Rafi
C.I.D.	"Ankhon Hi Ankhon Mein"	O. P. Nayyar	Majrooh Sultanpuri	Mohammad Rafi
C.I.D.	"Jaata Kahan Hai Deewane"	O. P. Nayyar	Majrooh Sultanpuri	solo
Chandrakanta	"Swami Tere Darshan Ko Aayi Brajbala"	N. Dutta	Sahir Ludhianvi	solo
Char Minar	"Beda Yeh Tere Hawale"	Shardul Kwatra	Vishwamitra Adil	solo
Char Minar	"Jhootha Hi Pyaar Karle"	Shardul Kwatra	Vishwamitra Adil	solo
Char Minar	"Mausam Jawaan Hai, Sab Kuchh Yahaan Hai"	Shardul Kwatra	Vishwamitra Adil	solo
Char Minar	"Daudo Ji Chor Chor Bhaaga"	Shardul Kwatra	Vishwamitra Adil	Mohammed Rafi
Chhoo Mantar	"Gham Nahin Kar Muskurake"	O. P. Nayyar	Jan Nisar Akhtar	Mohammed Rafi
Chhoo Mantar	"Gareeb Jaanke Humko"	O. P. Nayyar	Jan Nisar Akhtar	Mohammed Rafi
Chhoo Mantar	"Raat Nashili Rang Rangeeli Mast Hawa"	O. P. Nayyar	Jan Nisar Akhtar	solo
Chhoo Mantar	"Jab Badal Lehraya Jiya Jhum Jhum Ke Gaaya"	O. P. Nayyar	Jan Nisar Akhtar	solo
Chhoo Mantar	"Gori Gori Raat Hai"	O. P. Nayyar	Jan Nisar Akhtar	solo
Ek Shola	"Chanda Se Bhi Pyara Hai"	Madan Mohan	Majrooh Sultanpuri	Asha Bhosle
Ek Shola	"Hum Kaala Tum White"	Madan Mohan	Majrooh Sultanpuri	Mohammed Rafi
Fiffty Fiffty	"Shaam Ke Aanchal Dhalka"	Madan Mohan	Rajendra Krishan	solo
Fighting Queen	"Pihu Pihu Koyal Bole"	Nisar Bazmi	Saba Afghani	solo
Fighting Queen	"Ban Ke Bahaar Aayi Hoon"	Nisar Bazmi	Saba Afghani	solo
Ghulam Begum Badshah	"Duniya Kya Hai Dekho Zara"	Sudipta	Indeevar	solo
Ghulam Begum Badshah	"Dil Hai Yeh Tera"	Sudipta	Indeevar	solo
Guru Ghantal	"Yeh Kaisa Yog Liya Sarkar"	Lachhiram Tomar	Gafil Harnalvi	Mohammed Rafi
Guru Ghantal	"Hai Kisse Nazar Takra Gayi"	Lachhiram Tomar	Sarshar Sailani	S. Balbir
Guru Ghantal	"Aag Se Na Khelo Babuji"	Lachhiram Tomar	Sarshar Sailani	Agha Sarvar
Indar Sabha	"Laala Laala Gune Laala Pyaar Kare Hain"	A. R. Qureshi	Shewan Rizvi	Asha Bhosle
Heer	"Bulbul Mere Chaman Ke, Taqdir Meri Ban Ke"	Anil Biswas	Majrooh Sultanpuri	solo
Heer	"Dhadakne Laga Dil Nazar Jhuk Gayi"	Anil Biswas	Majrooh Sultanpuri	solo
Heer	"O Sajna Chhuta Hai Jo Daaman Tera"	Anil Biswas	Majrooh Sultanpuri	Hemant Kumar
Indar Sabha	"Lala Lala Gule Lala, Pyaar Kare Hain Kismetwala"	A. R. Qureshi	Shewan Rizvi	solo
Inquilab	"Dil Na Laage Dildaar Bina"	Hansraj Behl	Raja Mehdi Ali Khan	solo
Inquilab	"Tere Jahan Se Hum Chale"	Hansraj Behl	Raja Mehdi Ali Khan	solo
Inquilab	"Dilbar Se Pyaar Chhupane Mein Bada Maza Hai"	Hansraj Behl	Raja Mehdi Ali Khan	solo
Inquilab	"Tauba Tauba Darr Lage Huzoor Se"	Hansraj Behl	Raja Mehdi Ali Khan	solo
Inquilab	"Rangeele Mere Nazron Ke Do Jaam Pee Le"	Hansraj Behl	Raja Mehdi Ali Khan	solo
Inquilab	"Ae Baad-e-Saba Paigham Mera Dilbar Ko Mera Pahunchha Dena"	Hansraj Behl	Raja Mehdi Ali Khan	solo
Kaarwan	"Din Hai Bahaar Ke, Le Le Maje Pyaar Ke"	S. Mohinder	Tanvir Naqvi	solo
Khul Haa Sim Sim	"Dono Jahaan Ke Malik Hai, Tera Hi Aasra Hai"	Hansraj Behl	Asad Bhopali	Talat Mahmood
Khul Haa Sim Sim	"Aaj Tera Gunahgar Banda Gham Se"	Hansraj Behl	Asad Bhopali	Shashi Raj
Khul Haa Sim Sim	"Bijli Giregi Kahin Na Kahin"	Hansraj Behl	Asad Bhopali	solo
Khul Haa Sim Sim	"Dil Leke Chali Aayi Dildaar Ki Mehfil Mein"	Hansraj Behl	Asad Bhopali	solo
Khul Haa Sim Sim	"Aaj Kuchh Honewala Hain"	Hansraj Behl	Asad Bhopali	solo
Lalkaar	"Mehnat Karen Kisan"	Shanmukh Babu	Pandit Madhur	solo
Lalten	"Agar Pyaar Mein Muskuraye Na Hote"	Hemant Kumar	Kaif Irfani	solo
Lalten	"Lo Aaya Johnny Laalten"	Hemant Kumar	Indeevar	solo
Lalten	"Dil Ka Tattoo Ad Jaata Hai'	Hemant Kumar	Indeevar	Hemant Kumar
Lalten	"Maine Tujhe Pukaara, Tu Bhi Mujhe Pukaar"	Hemant Kumar	Shewan Rizvi	Hemant Kumar
Lalten	"Kabho Adkar Baat Na Karna"	Hemant Kumar	Kaif Irfani	Hemant Kumar
Lalten	"K Lilly Tu Thaam Jaa"	Hemant Kumar	Shewan Rizvi	S. Balbir
Makkhee Choos	"Munh Mod Lenewale"	Vinod	Pandit Indra Chandra	solo
Makkhee Choos	"O Arabpati Ki Chhori Gori Gori"	Vinod	Pandit Indra Chandra	Talat Mahmood
Malika	"Raat Hai Nikhri Huyi"	Hansraj Behl	Asad Bhopali	Krishna Goyal
Malika	"Suno Suno Sunayen Afsana"	Hansraj Behl	Tanvir Naqvi	Krishna Goyal
Malika	"O Meri Taraf Dekh Le Jaan-e-Jigar"	Hansraj Behl	Tanvir Naqvi	solo
Malika	"Yeh Husn Ki Mehfil Hai"	Hansraj Behl	Tanvir Naqvi	solo
Malika	"Idhar Dil Hai, Udhar Duniya"	Hansraj Behl	Tanvir Naqvi	solo
Mr. Lambu	"Jo Hum Tum Mil Gaye"	O. P. Nayyar	Jan Nisar Akhtar	solo
Mr. Lambu	"Aa Mere Dildaar, Kar Le Humse Naina Chaar"	O. P. Nayyar	Harsh	Mohammed Rafi
Naya Aadmi	"Suno Ji Suno Ji Yeh Zamana Hai Bura"	Vishwanathan–Ramamurthy, Madan Mohan	Rajendra Krishan	solo
Passing Show	"Yeh Hawayeb Sanam Yeh Nazare"	Manohar	Prem Dhawan	solo
Passing Show	Bachna Zara, Teer Chale"	Manohar	Prem Dhawan	solo
Passing Show	"Kuchh Nazron Se Kaam Le"	Manohar	Prem Dhawan	solo
Passing Show	"Laakh Dil Ko Bachao"	Manohar	Prem Dhawan	Krishna Goyal
Passing Show	"Yeh Jalwe Yeh Ada"	Manohar	Prem Dhawan	S. Balbir
Pocket Maar	"Duniya Ke Saath Chal Pyare"	Madan Mohan	Rajendra Krishan	solo
Rajrani Meera	"Paayo Ji Maine Ram Ratan Dhan Paayo"	S. N. Tripathi	Meera Bai, B. D. Mishra	solo
Rangeen Raaten	"Aji O Gokul Ke Gwale"	Roshan	Kidar Sharma	Lata Mangeshkar
Rangeen Raaten	"More Baalma, More Sajna Ho"	Roshan	Kidar Sharma	Lata Mangeshkar
Roop Kumari	"Woh Dekho Udhar Chand Nikla"	S. N. Tripathi	B. D. Mishra	Manna Dey
Roop Kumari	"Aayi Bahaar Muskurayi Bahaar"	S. N. Tripathi	B. D. Mishra	solo
Sailaab	"Hai Yeh Duniya Kaun Si"	Mukul Roy	Majrooh Sultanpuri	solo
Sailaab	"Prabhu Aayi Pujaran Tumhare Angna"	Mukul Roy	Majrooh Sultanpuri	solo
Sailaab	"Tan Pe Rang Sakhi"	Mukul Roy	Majrooh Sultanpuri	solo
Sailaab	"A Gayi, Aa Gayi Aa Gayi Re, Raat Rang Bhari Aa Gayi Re"	Mukul Roy	Shailendra	solo
Sailaab	"Yeh Rut Yeh Raat Jawaan"	Mukul Roy	Shailendra	solo
Sailaab	"Chand Ke Aansoo Shabnam Ban Ke"	Mukul Roy	Madhukar Rajasthani	solo
Sailaab	"Jiyara Baat Nahin Maane"	Mukul Roy	Hasrat Jaipuri	solo
Sati Anusuya	"Kaun Jaaye Re Mathura"	Shivram Krishnan	Bharat Vyas	solo
Sati Naag Kanya	"Thandi Hawayein Maare Jhatke"	S. N. Tripathi	Gopal Singh Nepali	solo
Sati Naag Kanya	"Choli Meri Peeli, Chunariya Meri Neeli"	S. N. Tripathi	Gopal Singh Nepali	solo
Sati Naag Kanya	"Hari Om Tatsat"	S. N. Tripathi	B. D. Mishra	Chitragupt
Shrikh Chilli	"Madhoshi Mein, Tanhayi Mein"	Vinod	Pandit Indra Chandra	G. M. Durrani
Shrimati 420	"Ae Dil Hai Mushkil"	O. P. Nayyar	Jan Nisar Akhtar	Mohammad Rafi
Shrimati 420	"Badi Rangeeli Zindagi Hai"	O. P. Nayyar	Jan Nisar Akhtar	solo
Shrimati 420	"Humko Chhod Ke Kahan Jaoge"	O. P. Nayyar	Jan Nisar Akhtar	solo
Shrimati 420	"Meri Zindagi Ke Humsafar Dekhna"	O. P. Nayyar	Jan Nisar Akhtar	solo
Sipahsalar	"Aji O Ji Tumnhe Dekh Liya Lehraaye"	Iqbal	Farooq Kaiser	solo
Sultana Daku	"Laga Le Dil Aa Jaa"	Bipin Babul	Shewan Rizvi	Ashima Banerjee
Taj Aur Talwar	"Thandi Thandi Chandni Mein Aaye Mera Dil"	Sudipt	Uddhav Kumar	solo
Taj Aur Talwar	"Bhole Bhale Matwale Piya Ghar Aaye Hain"	Sudipt	Uddhav Kumar	solo
Taj Aur Talwar	"Ab Kaun Sune Rote Huye Dil Ka Fasaba"	Sudipt	K. Razdan	solo
Toofan Aur Deeya	"Aaya Re Aaya Bhaajiwala"	Vasant Desai	Bharat Vyas	solo
Toofan Aur Deeya	"Meri Aan Bhagwan Kaan Kaan Se Ladi Hai"	Vasant Desai	Bharat Vyas	solo
Toofan Aur Deeya	"Meri Chhoti Si Bahen"	Vasant Desai	Bharat Vyas	Lata Mangeshkar

=== 1957 ===
Film	Song	Composer(s)	Writer(s)	Co-artist(s)
Ab Dilli Door Nahin	"Yeh Chaman Hamara Apna Hai"	Dattaram Wadkar	Shailendra	Asha Bhosle
Ab Dilli Door Nahin	"Lo Har Cheez Le Lo"	Dattaram Wadkar	Shailendra	Asha Bhosle
Ab Dilli Door Nahin	"Raghupati Raghav Raja Ram"	Dattaram Wadkar	Hasrat Jaipuri	Asha Bhosle, Shamshad Begum
Abhimaan	"Kal Raat Piya Ne Baat Kahi Kuchh Aisi"	Anil Biswas	Indeevar	solo
Abhimaan	"Ghar Ki Rani Hoon"	Anil Biswas	Indeevar	solo
Adhi Roti	"Dila Do Ek Roti Ka Tukda"	Avinash Vyas	Bharat Vyas	Mohammed Rafi
Adhi Roti	"Naa Toh Pita Ka Pyaar Milega"	Avinash Vyas	Bharat Vyas	Mohammed Rafi
Adhi Roti	"Soyi Hamare Sapnon Ki Duniya"	Avinash Vyas	Bharat Vyas	Mohammed Rafi
Adhi Roti	"Main Gori Gori Gori Gori Chhori"	Avinash Vyas	Bharat Vyas	solo
Adhi Roti	"So Jaa Re Soja, Mere al So Jaa"	Avinash Vyas	Bharat Vyas	solo
Adhi Roti	"Hamara Chacha Jawaharlal"	Avinash Vyas	Bharat Vyas	solo
Agra Road	"Unse Rippi Tippi Ho Gayi"	Roshan	Prem Dhawan	Mohammed Rafi
Agra Road	"Duniya Ki Najar Hai Buri"	Roshan		Mohammed Rafi
Agra Road	"Gazab Hua Ram, Sitam Hua"	Roshan		Mohammed Rafi
Agra Road	"O Mister, O Mister Suno Ek Baat"	Roshan	Manna Dey	
Agra Road	"Yeh Duniya Hai Babu Badi Beimaan"	Roshan	Bharat Vyas	solo
Agra Road	"Gunaahon Ka Chirag Kabhi Jal Na Sakega"	Roshan	Bharat Vyas	Mohammed Rafi, Shamshad Begum
Alladin Leila	"Yaad-e-Khuda Kiye Jaa"	A. R. Qureshi	Asad Bhopali	solo
Apradhi Kaun?	"Hain Pyaar Ke Do Matwale"	Salil Chowdhury	Majrooh Sultanpuri	Manna Dey
Bade Sarkar	"Jahan Jahan Khayal Jaata Hai"	O. P. Nayyar	Sahir Ludhianvi	Mohammed Rafi
Bandi	"Ghar Ki Raunak Hai Gharwali"	Hemant Kumar	Rajendra Krishan	Kishore Kumar
Bandi	"Gora Badan Mora Umariyaa Bali"	Hemant Kumar	Rajendra Krishan	solo
Bandi	"Yeh Mast Nazar Shokh Ada Kiske Liye Hai"	Hemant Kumar	Hemant Kumar	Prem Dhawan
Bhakta Dhruva	"Duniya Teri Tu Duniya"	Avinash Vyas	Pandit Madhur	Manna Dey
Bhakta Dhruva	"Kaali Kamli Odh Ke Aaye"	Basant Prakash	Pandit Madhur	solo
Captain Kishore	"O Raaja Ankhon Mein Tu Sama Jaa"	Chitragupt	Khumar Barabankvi	solo
Captain Kishore	"Geet Wafa Ke Gaate Chalo"	Chitragupt	Khumar Barabankvi	solo
Captain Kishore	"O Bewafa Yeh Toh Bata"	Chitragupt	Tanvir Naqvi	solo
Captain Kishore	"Dekho Ji Dil Na Todo"	Chitragupt	Raja Mehdi Ali Khan	solo
Captain Kishore	"Aankhen Milake Mera Dil Na Churao"	Chitragupt	Raja Mehdi Ali Khan	solo
Coffee House	"Ye Hawa Ye Fiza Ye Sama"	Roshan	Prem Dhawan	solo
Coffee House	"Dekhte Ho Jaise Hame Jante Nahi"	Roshan	Prem Dhawan	solo
Coffee House	"Is Mehfil Mein Aana Bachke"	Roshan	Prem Dhawan	solo
Dekh Kabira Roya	"Hum Panchhi Mastaane"	Madan Mohan	Rajendra Krishan	Lata Mangeshkar
Do Roti	"Ghir Se Barse Yeh Gahtaayen Toh"	Roshan	Khumar Barabankvi	Mohammed Rafi
Duniya Rang Rangeeli	"Kiya Yeh Kya Tune Ishara"	O. P. Nayyar	Jan Nisar Akhtar	solo
Ek Jhalak	"Aaja Jara Mere Dil Ke Sahare Dilruba"	Hemant Kumar	S. H. Bihari	Hemant Kumar
Ek Jhalak	"Kisliye Mathe Pe Bal Hai"	Hemant Kumar	S. H. Bihari	solo
Ek Saal	"Miyan Mera Bada Beimaan"	Ravi	Prem Dhawan	Balbir
Fashion	"Tum Aur Ham Bhul Ke Gham"	Hemant Kumar	Bharat Vyas	Hemant Kumar
Fashion	"Madbhari Hai Pyaar Ki Palke"	Hemant Kumar	Bharat Vyas	Lata Mangeshkar
Gateway of India	"Yeh Raat Badi Mushkil Hai"	Madan Mohan	Rajendra Krishan	solo
Hill Station	"Yeh Maara Woh Maara"	Hemant Kumar	S. H. Bihari	solo
Hill Station	"O Baazigar"	Hemant Kumar	S. H. Bihari	solo
Hill Station	"Gori Gori Patli Kalaai Re Balamva"	Hemant Kumar	S. H. Bihari	Mohammed Rafi
Janam Janam Ke Phere	"Rang Birange Phoolon Ki"	Chitragupt	Bharat Vyas	Mohammed Rafi
Jasoos	"Aa Dil Ki Baazi Lagaa"	Anil Biswas	Anand Bakshi	solo
Jasoos	"Angaare Hia Mat Chhu"	Anil Biswas	Saraswati Kumar Deepak	solo
Jeevan Sathi	"Bahaar Leke Aayi, Karaar Leke Aayi"	Bulo C. Rani	Indeevar	solo
Johnny Walker	"Thandi Thandi Hawa"	O. P. Nayyar	Hasrat Jaipuri	Asha Bhosle
Johnny Walker	"Bach Ke Balam Chal"	O. P. Nayyar	Hasrat Jaipuri	Mohammed Rafi
Khuda Ka Banda	"Tumhare Bichhadne Ka Gham Le Chale Hain"	S. N. Tripathi	Shewan Rizvi	solo
Khuda Ka Banda	"Naya Naya Chand Hai"	S. N. Tripathi	Shewan Rizvi	Manna Dey
Kitna Badal Gaya Insaan	"Kaahe Tadpaye Kaahe Tarsaye"	Hemant Kumar	S. H. Bihari	solo
Kitna Badal Gaya Insaan	"Aayi Bahaar Bhar Lo Phoolon Se"	Hemant Kumar	S. H. Bihari	solo
Kitna Badal Gaya Insaan	"Jab Tum Nahin To Chand Sitare Main Kya Karun"	Hemant Kumar	S. H. Bihari	solo
Laxmi Pooja	"Aaj Raas Ka Rang Hai"	Chitragupt	Bharat Vyas	solo
Mai Baap	"Tu Dil Mera Lauta De"	O. P. Nayyar	Qamar Jalalabadi	Mohammed Rafi
Mai Baap	"Dekho Ji Dekho Meethi Ada Se"	Jan Nisar Akhtar		Mohammed Rafi
Miss Bombay	"Humko Na Dekho Jaani Hanske"	Hansraj Behl	Asad Bhopali	solo
Miss Mary	"Aayi Re Ghir Ghir Pehli Pehli Badariya"	Hemant Kumar	Rajendra Krishan	solo
Mr. X	"Sadke Teri Chaal Ke Kajra"	N. Dutta	Tanvir Naqvi	Mohammed Rafi
Mumtaz Mahal	"Aayi Hoon Main Chamak Chandni"	Vinod	Hasrat Jaipuri	solo
Naag Mani	"Tune Khoob Racha Bhagwan Khilona Mati Ka"	Avinash Vyas	Kavi Pradeep	solo
Naag Mani	"Aaj Nahin Toh Kal Bikharenge Yeh Baadal"	Avinash Vyas	Kavi Pradeep	solo
Naag Padmini	"Ban Mein Mehmaan Ghar Aayo Re"	Shanmukh Babu	Prem Dhawan	solo
Naag Padmini	"Ho Naar Albeli, Na Jaiyo Akeli"	Shanmukh Babu	Prem Dhawan	solo
Naag Padmini	"Sapera Been Bajaay Gayo"	Shanmukh Babu	Prem Dhawan	Krishna Goyal
Naag Padmini	"Sun Dukjde Hamare Dukhiyon Ke Sahare"	Shanmukh Babu	Prem Dhawan	Sudha Malhotra
Naag Padmini	"Saare Jag Se Nain Chura Kar Ho Gayi Tori"	Shanmukh Babu	Prem Dhawan	Talat Mahmood
Nau Do Gyarah	"See Le Zubaan"	S D Burman	Majrooh Sultanpuri	solo
Nau Do Gyarah	"Kya Ho Phir Jo Din Rangeela Ho"	S D Burman	Majrooh Sultanpuri	Asha Bhosle
Neelofar	"Nigaahon Se Jab Teer Tune Nikala"	Basant Prakash	Hasrat Jaipuri	solo
Neelofar	"Jal Gaya Bahaar Mein, Mere Dil Ka Ashiyana"	Basant Prakash	Hasrat Jaipuri	solo
Paisa	"Tum Meri Rakho Laaj Hari"	Ram Ganguly	Surdas	solo
Paisa	"Deep Jalenge Deep, Deewali Aayi Ho"	Ram Ganguly	Lalchand Bismil	solo
Pak Daman	"Khel Khiladi Khele Jaa"	Ghulam Mohammad	Shakeel Badayuni	solo
Pak Daman	"Mil Mil Akhiyan Balam"	Ghulam Mohammad	Shakeel Badayuni	solo
Pawan Putra Hanuman	"Koi Keh De Re"	Chitragupt	Gopal Singh Nepali	solo
Paying Guest	"Gaaye Ghabraye Ke"l	S. D. Burman	Majrooh Sultanpuri	solo
Pyaasa	"Aaj Sajan Mohe Ang Lagalo"	S. D. Burman	Sahir Ludhianvi	solo
Pyaasa	"Jaane Kya Tune Kahi"	S. D. Burman	Sahir Ludhianvi	solo
Pyaasa	"Hum Aap Ki Aankhon Mein"	S. D. Burman	Sahir Ludhianvi	Mohammad Rafi
Pyaasa	"Ho Laakh Musibat Raaste Mein"	S. D. Burman	Sahir Ludhianvi	Mohammad Rafi
Raja Vikram	"O Aasmanwale"	B. N. Bali	Bharat Vyas	solo
Raja Vikram	"Humri Nagariya Aake Sanwariye, Na Jaa Re"	B. N. Bali	Bharat Vyas	solo
Raja Vikram	"Chup Kyun Dharti Maata"	B. N. Bali	Bharat Vyas	solo
Raja Vikram	"Chali Re Chali Re, Piya Ke Gali Re"	B. N. Bali	Bharat Vyas	solo
Ram Hanuman Yuddh	"Door Gagan Par Chamke Sitara"	S. N. Tripathi	Ramesh Pandey	Dilip Dholakia
Samundar	"Le Gaya Dekho Dekho Dil"	Madan Mohan	Rajendra Krishan	Mohammed Rafi
Samundar	"Gaao Re Khushiyon Ka Tarana"	Madan Mohan	Rajendra Krishan	Mohammed Rafi
Samundar	"Dil Ko Lagaaye Yeh Gawara Bhi Nahin"	Madan Mohan	Rajendra Krishan	solo
Sant Raghu	"Neel Gagan Mein Chanda Chamke"	Avinash Vyas	Bharat Vyas	solo
Shahi Bazar	"Rut Muskurayi Re, Leke Angdaai"	Dhaniram, S. Haridarshan	Anand Bakshi	Sudha Malhotra, Suhasini Kolhapure
Shehzadi	"Aa Aa Mil, Dhadke Mera Dil"	S. D. Batish	Qamar Jalalabadi	solo
Shehzadi	"Chunnilal Tera Bura Haal"	S. D. Batish	Qamar Jalalabadi	S. D. Batish
Sher-e-Baghdad	"Masti Mein Dooba Saara Jahaan"	Jimmy	Jimmy	solo
Sher-e-Baghdad	"Dil Mera Dhadke Haye"	Jimmy	Jimmy	solo
Sher-e-Baghdad	"Baar Baar Meri Gali Aana"	Jimmy	Jimmy	solo
Shyam Ki Jogan	"Main Toh Prem Deewani Ho Gayi Re"	Narayan	S. P. Kalla	solo
Taj Poshi	"Mohabbat Aag Bhi Hai"	Bipin–Babul	Anjum Jaipuri	solo
Ustad	"Kya Dil Mein Chhupa Hain Tere"	O. P. Nayyar	Jan Nisar Akhtar	Mohammed Rafi
Ustad	"Chor Lutere Daku"	O. P. Nayyar	Jan Nisar Akhtar	solo
Yahudi Ki Ladki	"Hum Kisi Se Na Kahenge"	Hemant Kumar	S. H. Bihari	Shamshad Begum
Yahudi Ki Ladki	"Duniya Se Dil Lagake"	Hemant Kumar	S. H. Bihari	solo
Yahudi Ki Ladki	"Aa Humse Pyar Kar Le"	Hemant Kumar	S. H. Bihari	solo
Yahudi Ki Ladki	"Kar Le Dil Ka Sauda Dil Se"	Hemant Kumar	S. H. Bihari	solo
Yahudi Ki Ladki	"Na Ho Dil Jiske Dil Mein"	Hemant Kumar	S. H. Bihari	solo
Zamana	"Din Bahaar Ke Hai, Aaja Pyaar Kar Le"	Salil Chowdhury	Prem Dhawan	solo

=== 1958 ===
Film	Song	Composer(s)	Writer(s)	Co-artist(s)
12 O'Clock	"Dekh Idhar Ae Haseena"	O. P. Nayyar	Majrooh Sultanpuri	Mohammad Rafi
12 O'Clock	"Tum Jo Mere Humsafar Huye Ho"	O. P. Nayyar	Majrooh Sultanpuri	Mohammad Rafi
12 O'Clock	"Kaisa Jadoo Balam Tune"	O. P. Nayyar	Majrooh Sultanpuri	solo
12 O'Clock	"Are Tauba Are Tauba	O. P. Nayyar	Majrooh Sultanpuri	solo
12 O'Clock	"Aji O Suno To"	O. P. Nayyar	Majrooh Sultanpuri	solo
Aakash Pari	"Khel Nahin Dil Se Woh Dil Ka Lagana"	Inayat Ali	Anjum Pilibhiti	G. M. Durrani
Aakash Pari	"Ho Gaye Barbaad Hun Achchha Hua"	Inayat Ali	Anjum Pilibhiti	G. M. Durrani
Aakash Pari	"Karwat Woh Zamane Ne Badli"	Inayat Ali	Anjum Pilibhiti	solo
Adalat	"Dupatta Mera Malmal Ka"	Madan Mohan	Rajendra Krishan	Asha Bhosle
Balyogi Upmanyu	"Sukhi Nahin Woh Jo"	Chitragupt	Bharat Vyas	Mohammed Rafi, Usha Mangeshkar
Chaalbaaz	"Yeh Kya Ada Hai Pagle"	Chitragupt	Anjum Jaipuri	solo
Chaalbaaz	"Ho Chat Maangni Toh Pat Shaadi"	Chitragupt	Anjum Jaipuri	Mohammed Rafi
Chaalbaaz	"Aamva Ki Daal Pe Jhoole Pade"	Chitragupt	Prem Dhawan	Usha Mangeshkar, Mohammed Rafi
Chaalbaaz	"Bhaaga Re Bhaaga, Dil Chura Ke Chor"	Chitragupt	Prem Dhawan	Ram Kamlani
Chandan	"Aankh Milane Ke Liye"	Madan Mohan	Rajendra Krishan	solo
Chandu	"Gore Gore Gaalon Pe Kaala Yeh Til"	Bipin–Babul	Raja Mehdi Ali Khan	solo
Daughter of Sindbad	"Yeh Dil Deewana Hua Begana"	Chitragupt	Prem Dhawan	solo
Daughter of Sindbad	"Dil De Baithe Jahan Dil Aa Gaya"	Chitragupt	Prem Dhawan	solo
Daughter of Sindbad	"Ek Dil Liya Ek Dil Diya"	Chitragupt	Prem Dhawan	solo
Daughter of Sindbad	"Bheegi Bheegi Shaam Chhalakte Jaam"	Chitragupt	Prem Dhawan	solo
Daughter of Sindbad	"Ae Jaaneman Janane Man"	Chitragupt		solo
Daughter of Sindbad	"Jidhar Bulayen Jawan Nigahein"	Chitragupt		solo
Daughter of Sindbad	"Suniye Suniye Hamara Fasana"	Chitragupt	Anjum Jaipuri	Mohammed Rafi
Detective	"Do Chamakti Aankhon Mein"	Mukul Roy	Shailendra	solo
Detective	"Mujhko Tum Jo Mile"	Mukul Roy	Shailendra	solo
Detective	"Mujhko Tum Jo Mile" (duet)	Mukul Roy	Shailendra	Hemant Kumar
Detective	"Aaja Karle Muqabla"	Mukul Roy	Shailendra	Mohammed Rafi
Detective	"Kal Talak Hum Theek Tha"	Mukul Roy	Shailendra	Mohammed Rafi
Dilli Ka Thug	"O Babu O Lala, Mausam Dekho Chala"	Ravi	Majrooh Sultanpuri	solo
Do Mastane	"Kabhi Aladkar Baat Na Karna"	Hemant Kumar	Kaif Irfani	Hemant Kumar
Dulhan	"I Love You O Madam"	Ravi	S. H. Bihari	Asha Bhosle
Dulhan	"Toh Phir Tumko"	Ravi	S. H. Bihari	Asha Bhosle
Farishta	"Bach Bach Bach Kahun, Sach Sach Sach"	O. P. Nayyar	Jan Nisar Akhtar	solo
Ghar Grihasti	"Mat Kariyo Jhapat"	Sushant Banerjee	Pandit Madhur	solo
Ghar Grihasti	"Main Toh Kayi Hoon Sarkar"	Sushant Banerjee	Pandit Madhur	Manna Dey
Harishchandra	"O Re Mere Rajdulare"	Sushant Banerjee	Pandit Madhur	solo
Harishchandra	"Mere Nanhe Re, Mere Munne"	Sushant Banerjee	Pandit Madhur	solo
Howrah Bridge	"Mera Naam Chin Chin Chu"	O. P. Nayyar	Qamar Jalalabadi	solo
Insaaf Kahan Hai	"Tujhe Doon Main Kya Tu Hi Bata"	Robin Banerjee	Hairat Sitapuri	Hemant Kumar
Insaaf Kahan Hai	"Jaa Chhup Nazaro Se"	Robin Banerjee	Hairat Sitapuri	solo
Insaaf Kahan Hai	"Saiyyan Bedardi Tod Diya"	Robin Banerjee	Hairat Sitapuri	solo
Insaaf Kahan Hai	"Hey Babu Hey Bandhu" (female)	Robin Banerjee	Hairat Sitapuri	solo
Insaaf Kahan Hai	"Kismat Pe Ronewale"	Robin Banerjee	Hairat Sitapuri	solo
Lajwanti	"Aaja Chhaye Kaare Badra"	S. D. Burman	Majrooh Sultanpuri	solo
Light House	"Aa Aa Aa Chhori Aa Aa Aa"	N. Dutta	Sahir Ludhianvi	Mohammed Rafi
Milan	"Aaiye Janab, Baithiye Janab"	Hansraj Behl	P. L. Santoshi	solo
Milan	"Ae Bibi Ji, Maine Kaha Ji"	Hansraj Behl	Prem Dhawan	Mohammed Rafi
Mr. Cartoon M.A.	"Dil Tera Deewana, O Mastani Bulbul"	O. P. Nayyar	Hasrat Jaipuri	solo
Mujrim	"Sun Mere Madras Ki Chhori"	O. P. Nayyar	Majrooh Sultanpuri	Asha Bhosle
Mujrim	"Chanda Chandni Mein Jab Chamke"	O. P. Nayyar	Majrooh Sultanpuri	solo
Naya Kadam	"Khelo Khiladi Khel Aisa"	Narayan	S. P. Kalla	solo
Naya Paisa	"Mera Dil Tujh Pe Qurbaan Hai"	S. Mohinder	Raja Mehdi Ali Khan	Mohammed Rafi
Naya Paisa	"Main Tere Dil Ki Duniya Mein"	S. Mohinder	Surendra	
Night Club	"Kahan Phir Hum, Lahan Phir Tum"	Madan Mohan	Majrooh Sultanpuri	solo
Pehla Pehla Pyaar	"Akka Bakka Tin Tila, Mausam Hai Khila"	B. N. Bali	Madan Mohan (Lyricist)	solo
Panchayat	"Zindagani Rut Suhaani"	Iqbal Qureshi	Shakeel Nomani	Mohammed Rafi
Panchayat	"Haal Yeh Kya Kar Diya Zaalim"	Iqbal Qureshi	Shakeel Nomani	Mohammed Rafi
Panchayat	"Taa Thaiya Jarke Anaa, O Jaadugar More Saiyan"	Iqbal Qureshi	Shakeel Nomani	Lata Mangeshkar
Police	"Mere Tum Ho, Phir Kya Hai"	Hemant Kumar	Majrooh Sultanpuri	Hemant Kumar
Police	"Dil Par Yeh Kaisa Tune Khanjar Maara Re"	Hemant Kumar	Majrooh Sultanpuri	Hemant Kumar
Police	"Chhup Jaa Hamare Dil Mein"	Hemant Kumar	Majrooh Sultanpuri	Hemant Kumar
Police	"O O O Baby Mud Ke Zara"	Hemant Kumar	Majrooh Sultanpuri	Hemant Kumar
Police	"Chale Hum Kahan Kaho"	Hemant Kumar	Majrooh Sultanpuri	Hemant Kumar
Police	"Sun Le Piya, Dhadke Jiya"	Hemant Kumar	Majrooh Sultanpuri	Hemant Kumar
Raagini	"Iss Duniya Se Nirala Hu Main"	O. P. Nayyar	Jan Nisar Akhtar	Asha Bhosle
Raj Sinhasan	"Do Do Aane Chaku, Chaar Aane Kataari"	Chitragupt	Anjum Jaipuri	Mohammed Rafi
Ram Bhakti	"Paayo Ji Maine Ram Ratan Dhan Paayo"	Avinash Vyas	Meera Bai	solo
Ram Bhakti	"Koi Maange Sona Chandi"	Avinash Vyas	Bharat Vyas	solo
Sadhna	"Tora Manwa Kyun Ghabraye"	S D Burman	Sahir Ludhianvi	solo
Sair-e-Paristan	"Zaalim Tera Ishaara Hai"	Suresh–Talwar	Anjaan	solo
Savera	"Tere Bin Mora Jiya Na Maane"	Shailesh Mukherjee	Prem Dhawan	solo
Savera	"Thehro Zara Si Der Toh"	Shailesh Mukherjee	Prem Dhawan	solo
Sim Sim Margina	"Aaj Kuchh Honewala Hai"	Hansraj Behl	Asad Bhopali	solo
Sitamgar	"Humne Sapne Dekh Liye"	G Ramanathan, B N Bali	Sajan Bihari	Manna Dey
Sitamgar	"Dil Mera Le Le Piya Mere Bhole"	G Ramanathan, B N Bali	Sajan Bihari	Manna Dey
Sitamgar	"Zara Bachna Gori Se Bachna"	G Ramanathan, B N Bali	Sajan Bihari	S. Balbir
Sitamgar	"Aaj Ke Din Jhoom Le"	G Ramanathan, B N Bali	Sajan Bihari	Manna Dey, Aarti Mukherjee
Sitamgar	"Jaise Chaman Me Phul Khile"	G Ramanathan, B N Bali	Sajan Bihari	Sudha Malhotra
Sitamgar	"Kahan Jaun Man Ye Bole Kaha Jaun"	G Ramanathan, B N Bali	Sajan Bihari	solo
Sitaron Se Aage	"Dil Le Gaya, Gham De Gaya"	S. D. Burman	Majrooh Sultanpuri	solo
Son of Sindbad	"O Dilwale Zara Sambhal Ke Mehfil Mein Aana"	Chitragupt	Prem Dhawan	solo
Son of Sindbad	"Shokh Adaayen Mast Nigaahen"	Chitragupt	Prem Dhawan	Lata Mangeshkar
Son of Sindbad	"Chhedo Ji Aaj Koi Pyaar Ka Tarana"	Chitragupt	Prem Dhawan	Lata Mangeshkar
Son of Sindbad	"Kabhi Toh Haan Haan Kaho Na"	Chitragupt	Prem Dhawan	Mohammed Rafi
Son of Sindbad	"Kadmon Mein Hamara Manzil"	Chitragupt	Prem Dhawan	Mohammed Rafi
Taqdeer	"Aa Dil Se Dil Mila Le"	Dhaniram	Kuldeep Singh Chand	solo
Taxi 555	"Koi Chand Koi Tara"	Sardar Malik	Prem Dhawan	Mohammed Rafi
Taxi Stand	"Yeh Milan Ki Raina Khulte Nahin"	Chitragupt	Majrooh Sultanpuri	solo
Taxi Stand	"Neechi Nazron Se Namaste Kar Gaye"	Chitragupt	Majrooh Sultanpuri	Usha Mangeshkar
Teerth Yatra	"Bol Ri Kashi, Bol Ri Mathura"	Suresh–Talwar	Madan Mohan (Lyricist)	solo
Teesri Gali	"Ek Shola Bhadkega, Ek Patanga Tadpega"	Chitragupt	Majrooh Sultanpuri	solo
Teesri Gali	"Jaan Gaye Chori Tunharu Zaalima"	Chitragupt	Majrooh Sultanpuri	solo
Teesri Gali	"Mere Sanam Ek Kadam"	Chitragupt	Majrooh Sultanpuri	solo
Ten O'Clock	"Dhire Dhire Dil Me Sama Ke Dekh"	Ram Ganguly	Khawar Zaman	solo
Ten O'Clock	"Meri Ankhiyon Ke Dore Gulabi Jisae Chahun"	Ram Ganguly	Khawar Zaman	solo
Ten O'Clock	"Sambhal Sambhal Ke Chalna Phir Dekh"	Ram Ganguly	Khawar Zaman	solo
Ten O'Clock	"Hothon Pe Laali Hai, Aankh Bhi Kaali Hai"	Ram Ganguly	Verma Malik	solo
Ten O'Clock	"O Soniye O Soniye Jab Jeet Hui Hamari"	Ram Ganguly	Shyam	Mohammed Rafi
Yahudi	"Bechain Dil, Khoyi Si Nazar"	Shankar–Jaikishan	Shailendra	Lata Mangeshkar
Zimbo	"Yeh Raaten Aaha Yeh Baaten"	Chitragupt	Majrooh Sultanpuri	solo

=== 1959 ===
Film	Song	Composer(s)	Writer(s)	Co-artist(s)
Angan	"Sitamgar Dekh Le Najar Bar Dekh Le"	Roshan	Rajendra Krishan	Asha Bhosle
Ardhangini	"Dil Hum To Haare, Tum Kaho Pyaare"	Vasant Desai	Majrooh Sultanpuri	Mohammed Rafi
Ardhangini	"Tune Jo Idhar Dekha, Haay Maine Bhi Udher Dekha"	Vasant Desai	Majrooh Sultanpuri	Mohammed Rafi
Ardhangini	"Kal Saajna Milna Yahaan"	Vasant Desai	Majrooh Sultanpuri	Mohammed Rafi
Baap Bete	"Unchi Neechi Raahen Yeh, Pyaar Je Raste Tedhe"	Madan Mohan	Rajendra Krishan	Lata Mangeshkar
Baazigar	"Karle Pyaar Karle"	Chitragupt	Prem Dhawan	solo
Baazigar	"Laayi Hoon Raja"	Chitragupt	Prem Dhawan	solo
Baazigar	"Nazar Je Aisa Mara"	Chitragupt	Prem Dhawan	Lata Mangeshkar
Baazigar	"Do Do Hain Deewane Mere Parwane"	Chitragupt	Prem Dhawan	Mohammed Rafi, S. Balbir
Bedard Zamana Kya Jaane	"Oonchi Ediwalon Ne"	Kalyanji	Bharat Vyas	Mohammed Rafi
Bhai Bahen	"Jaate Jaate Isharon Se Mar Gayi Re"	N. Dutta	Sahir Ludhianvi	Mohammed Rafi
Bhakt Prahlad	"Meri Laagi Hai Lagan Bhagwan Se"	S. N. Tripathi	B. D. Mishra	solo
Bus Conductor	"Daav Chalne Ko Hai"	Bipin–Babul	Noor Devasi	solo
Circus Queen	"Hum Tumse Poochhte Hain, Sach Sach Humejn Bataana"	Shafi M. Nagri	Naqsh Lyallpuri	Mohammed Rafi
Commander	"Kaisa Aaya Hai Zamana"	Chitragupt	Sarshar Sailani	solo
Commander	"Machal Ke Dil Kahe Mera"	Chitragupt	Sarshar Sailani	solo
Commander	"O Mast Nazarwale Ham Hai Tere Matwale"	Chitragupt	Sarshar Sailani	solo
Commander	"Dil Lagana Tu Kya Jane"	Chitragupt	Sarshar Sailani	solo
Daaka	"Dil Phanse, Oho Deke Jhanse"	Chitragupt	Prem Dhawan	solo
Doctor Z	"Yeh Bheegi Bheegi Raat"	Manohar Arora	Akhtar Romani	Mohammed Rafi
Doctor Z	"Aasman Par Hai Jitne Sitare"	Manohar Arora	Akhtar Romani	solo
Doctor Z	"Dil Ko Laga Ke Bhul Se"	Manohar Arora	Akhtar Romani	Talat Mahmud
Doctor Z	"Main Hoon Maiya Dim Timkar"	Manohar Arora	Akhtar Romani	S. Balbir
Durga Mata (Dubbed)	"Tum Mere Man Mein"	G. K. Venkatesh	S. R. Saaz	Manna Dey
Ek Armaan Mera	"Ek Armaan Nera, Dil Toh Pehchan Nera"	S. D. Batish	Madhusudan Bhagalpuri	solo
Ek Armaan Mera	"Aaje Shamma Ka Kareeb"	S. D. Batish	Kaif Irfani	solo
Fashionable Wife	"Badal Rahi Zameen Badal Raha Aasman"	Suresh Talwar	Bharat Vyas	solo
Fashionable Wife	"Shirdi Ke Sai Baba"	Suresh Talwar	Bharat Vyas	solo
Fashionable Wife	"Jhumo Re Jhumne Ke Din Aaye"	Suresh Talwar	Bharat Vyas	Mahendra Kapoor
Fashionable Wife	"Sadak Pyaar Ki, Kadak Badi Hai"	Suresh Talwar	Bharat Vyas	Sudha Malhotra
Ghar Ghar Ki Baat	"Sab Ko Bhagwan Dekh Raha Tu"	Kalyanji	Gulshan Bawra	Suman Kalyanpur
Goonj Uthi Shehnai	"Ankhiyan Bhool Gayi Hain Sona"	Vasant Desai	Bharat Vyas	Lata Mangeshkar
Grihalakshmi	"Patle Patle Hothon Ki"	Avinash Vyas	Bharat Vyas	solo
Guest House	"Humne Dekha Pyaar Mein"	Chitragupt	Prem Dhawan	solo
Hum Bhi Insaan Hain	"Gori Teri Natkhat Naina"	Hemant Kumar	Shailendra	Subir Sen
Hum Bhi Insaan Hain	"Phoolwa Ban Mehke"	Hemant Kumar	Shailendra	Suman Kalyanpur
Insaan Jaag Utha	"Jaanu Jaanu Ri Kahin Khanake Hai Tori Kangana"	S D Burman	Shailendra	Asha Bhosle
Jaalsaz	"Jab Jab Tujhko Chhua"	N. Dutta	Majrooh Sultanpuri	Kishore Kumar
Jagga Daku	"Teri Kasam Tujhko Sanam"	S. N. Tripathi	B. D. Mishra	solo
Jagga Daku	"Laga Nazar Ka Teer"	S. N. Tripathi	B. D. Mishra	solo
Jagga Daku	"Woh Bhi Hai Aadmi"	S. N. Tripathi	B. D. Mishra	solo
Jagga Daku	"Madbhari Mastibahri Yee Raat Hai"	S. N. Tripathi	B. D. Mishra	Manna Dey
Jagga Daku	"Tu Rupnagar Ki Roop Ki Raja"	S. N. Tripathi	B. D. Mishra	Manna Dey
Jagir	"Tumse Nazar Mili! Dil Ko Khabar Mili"	Madan Mohan	Raja Mehdi Ali Khan	solo
Jai Singh	"Aaj Mere Yeh Ishaare"	Ramesh Naidu	Prem Dhawan	solo
Jawani Ki Hawa	"Kaun Jaane Re Baba"	Ravi	Shailendra	Mohammed Rafi, Asha Bhosle
Jungke King	"Ban Ke Bahaar Aayi Hoon"	Bipin Babul	Anjum Jaipuri	solo
Jungke King	"Pihu Pihu Koyal Bole"	Bipin Babul	Anjum Jaipuri	solo
Jwalamukhi	"Tum Tana Tum Tana, Balam Koi Karke Bahana"	Devraj	Dukhi Amritsari	G. M. Durrani
Jwalamukhi	"Ek Jahaan Aur Bhi Hai"	Devraj	Dukhi Amritsari	solo
Kaagaz Ke Phool	"Ek Do Teen Chaar Aur Paanch"	S. D. Burman	Kaifi Azmi	solo
Kaagaz Ke Phool	"Waqt Ne Kiya"	S. D. Burman	Kaifi Azmi	solo
Kal Hamara Hai	"Aa Aa Meri Taal Par Naach"	Chitragupt	Majrooh Sultanpuri	solo
Kangan	"Baras Baras Tak Laakh Sambhala"	Chitragupt	Rajendra Krishan	solo
Kangan	"Aag Lagana Kya Mushkil Hai"	Chitragupt	Rajendra Krishan	solo
Kangan	"Jawaab Nahin Gore Mukhde Par"	Chitragupt	Rajendra Krishan	Mohammed Rafi
Kavi Kalidas	"Sakhi Hriday Mein Halchal Si Hone Laagi"	S. N. Tripathi	Bharat Vyas	Asha Bhosle, Manna Dey
Kavi Kalidas	"Door Desh Se Koi Sapera Aaya"	S. N. Tripathi	Bharat Vyas	solo
Kavi Kalidas	"Naaye Naaye Rangon Se Likhti"	S. N. Tripathi	Bharat Vyas	Manna Dey
Kya Yeh Bombai Hai	"Nazron Mein Hai Sau Afsane"	Bipin Dutta	Noor Devasi	solo
Kya Yeh Bombai Hai	"Zaban Na Kholna"	Bipin Dutta	Noor Devasi	solo
Kya Yeh Bombai Hai	"Nazron Mein Hai Sau Afsane"	Bipin Dutta	Noor Devasi	solo
Ladki	"Chale Aa Rahe Hai Lutane Ko Jaan"	Vinod	Verma Malik	solo
Lady Robinhood	"Na Manoongi, Fight Karega"	Shardul Kwatra	Bandhu	Mahendra Kapoor
Lady Robinhood	"Sambha Sambha Rock N Roll"	Shardul Kwatra	Bekal Amritsari	solo
Love Marriage	"Kareeb Aao, Na Tadpao"	Shankar–Jaikishan	Shailendra	solo
Love Marriage	"Dil Se Dil Takraye"	Shankar–Jaikishan	Shailendra	Mohammed Rafi
Maa Ke Ansoo	"Aaja Re Sanam Main To Naachun"	Sardar Malik	Raja Mehdi Ali Khan	solo
Maa Ke Ansoo	"In Ankhon Ne Unko Mahin Dekha"	Sardar Malik	Raja Mehdi Ali Khan	solo
Madame XYZ	"O Goriye, O Poriye, O Chhoriye"	Chitragupt	Prem Dhawan	Manna Dey
Mr. John	"Tip Tip Toe, Mere Dil Hain Do"	N. Dutta	Jan Nisar Akhtar	Mohammed Rafi
Naach Ghar	"Main Hoon Mr. John"	N. Dutta	Sahir Ludhianvi	Mohammed Rafi
Nai Raahen	"Oye Teri Chulbuli Chaal Pe Kurban Hai Yeh Dil"	Ravi	Majrooh Sultanpuri	Lata Mangeshkar
Nek Khatoon	"Aayi Hoon Dar Pe Tere, Main Ban Ke Sawaali" (part 1)	Jimmy	Khawar Zaman	solo
Nek Khatoon	"Aayi Hoon Dar Pe Tere, Main Ban Ke Sawaali" (part 2)	Jimmy	Khawar Zaman	solo
Nek Khatoon	"Looot Le, Loot Le, Duniya Ke Maze"	Jimmy	Khawar Zaman	solo
Nek Khatoon	"Maula Ab Toh Sun"	Jimmy	Khawar Zaman	solo
Nek Khatoon	"Sun Le Zameen Aasman Ke Khuda"	Jimmy	Khawar Zaman	solo
O Tera Kya Kehna	"Majnu Ke Chhilke, Chor Hain Yeh Dil Ke"	Kalyanji	Gulshan Bawra	solo
Pyar Ki Rahen	"Dekho Ji Akele Aaya Jaaya Na Karo"	Kanu Ghosh	Prem Dhawan	Mohammed Rafi
Pyar Ki Rahen	"Ghar Wale Ghar Nahi, Hume Kisi Kaa Dar Nahi"	Kanu Ghosh	Prem Dhawan	Mohammed Rafi
Saahil	"Aaja Re Majhdhar Mein"	Suresh Talwar	Taaban Jhansvi	solo
Saahil	"Bas Khatam Kar De Dastaan"	Suresh Talwar	Taaban Jhansvi	solo
School Master	"Ae Hawaein Ae Dishayen Batao"	Vasant Desai	Kavi Pradeep	Lata Mangeshkar
School Master	"Hello Hello O Meri Chhammak Chhallo"	Vasant Desai	Kavi Pradeep	Mohammed Rafi
Shararat	"Dekh Aasmaan Mein Chand"	Shankar-Jaikishan	Hasrat Jaipuri	Kishore Kumar
Shararat	"Tune Mera Dil Liya"	Shankar-Jaikishan	Hasrat Jaipuri	Kishore Kumar
Sujata	"Bachpan Ke Din Bhi"	S D Burman	Majrooh Sultanpuri	Asha Bhosle
Sujata	"Nanhi Kali Sone Chali"	S D Burman	Majrooh Sultanpuri	solo
Tikdambaaz	"Yeh Duniya Dagabaaz Hai"	B. N. Bali	Khawar Zaman	solo

== 1960s ==
=== 1960 ===
Film	Song	Composer(s)	Writer(s)	Co-artist(s)
Apna Ghar	"Tum Hi Meri Zindagi"	Ravi	Prem Dhawan	Mukesh
Baghdad	"Puri Loot Gayi Mujhse Ulfat Na Chhute"	Jamal Sen	Pandit Indra Chandra	solo
Baghdad	"Bulbul Pyaar Mein Jiye"	Jamal Sen	Pandit Indra Chandra	solo
Bambai Ki Billi	"Dil Ke Paar Ho Gayi Ek Nazar"	Khayyam	Hasrat Jaipuri	solo
Bambai Ki Billi	"Dildar Tu Hai Mera Pyar"	Khayyam	Hasrat Jaipuri	solo
Banjarin	"Chhal Chhal Chhalke Neer Gagariya Bhaari Re"	Pardesi	Pandit Madhur	solo
Banjarin	"Kismat Ke Khel Tu Khel Anadi"	Pardesi	Pandit Madhur	solo
Banjarin	"Dil Tune Diya, Dil Maine Liya"	Pardesi	Pandit Madhur	Mukesh
Baraat	"Zaalim Kehna Maan"	Chitragupt	Majrooh Sultanpuri	Mohammed Rafi
Baraat	"Aji Ab Kehna Maan Jaao"	Chitragupt	Majrooh Sultanpuri	Mohammed Rafi
Bhakt Raj	"Koi Maange Sona Chandi"	Avinash Vyas	Bharat Vyas	solo
Bhakt Raj	"Paayo Re Maine Ram Ratan"	Avinash Vyas	Bharat Vyas	solo
Black Prince	"In Kaali Kaali Ankhon Mein"	Dulal Sen	Upendra	Mohammed Rafi
Black Tiger	"Parwana Kehta Hai Kya Afsana"	Bulo C. Rani	Saba Afghani	Mahendra Kapoor
Black Tiger	"O Meri Gaadi Gaadi, Kaun Jehta Hain Khatari"	Bulo C. Rani	Saba Afghani	Mohammed Rafi
Chandramukhi	"Nadi Kinare Koi Pukaare"	S. N. Tripathi	Bharat Vyas	Mohammed Rafi
Chaudhvin Ka Chand	"Balam Se Milan Hoga"	Ravi	Shakeel Badayuni	solo
Chhabili	"Yaaron Kisi Se Na Kehna"	Snehal Bhatkar	S. Ratan	Nutan
Dil Bhi Tera Hum Bhi Tere	"Aadmi Garib Ho Ya Amir Hoo"	Kalyanji–Anandji	K. L. Pardesi	Mahendra Kapoor
Do Aadmi	"Bheegi Bheegi Mehki Mehki Raat Hai"	S. N. Triapthi	Prem Dhawan	solo
Dr. Shaitan	"Main Hoon Atom Bomb"	N. Dutta	Jan Nisar Akhtar	solo
Dr. Shaitan	"Na Na Na, Ab Aake Jaa Na"	N. Dutta	Jan Nisar Akhtar	solo
Dr. Shaitan	"Tum Mile Woh Dil Chale"	N. Dutta	Jan Nisar Akhtar	Mohammed Rafi
Dr. Shaitan	"Mausam Suhana Hai Door Kahin Chal"	N. Dutta	Jan Nisar Akhtar	Mukesh
Duniya Jhukti Hai	"Gumsum Sa Yeh Jahan"	Hemant Kumar	Rajendra Krishan	Hemant Kumar
Ek Ke Baad Ek	Haath Pasare Raste Raste"	S. D. Burman	Kaifi Azmi	Sudha Malhotra
Ek Ke Baad Ek	"Batao Kya Karoongi"	S. D. Burman	Kaifi Azmi	Mohammed Rafi
Hum Hindustani	"Tu Laage Mora Balam"	Usha Khanna	K. Manohar	Usha Khanna
Jis Desh Mein Ganga Behti Hai	"Hai Aag Hamari Seene Mein"	Shankar–Jaikishan	Shailendra	Mukesh, Manna Dey, Mahendra Kapoor, Lata Mangeshkar
Kala Bazar	"Na Main Dhan Chahoon"	S. D. Burman	Shailendra	Sudha Malhotra
Kala Bazar	"Rimjhim Ke Taraane Leke Aayi"	S. D. Burman	Shailendra	Mohammad Rafi
Lady of The Lake	"Sun Re I Chhaliya, Bole Kya Paayalia"	Suresh–Talwar	Anjaan	Mahendra Kapoor
Lalach	"Shaniwar Se Itwar Achchha Rahega"	S. Kishan	Khawar Zaman	solo
Maa Baap	"Tumhi Ne Chhup Chhup Ke Dil Ko Uchhala"	Chitragupt	Rajendra Krishan	solo
Manzil	"Chupke Se Mile Pyase Pyase"	S. D. Burman	Majrooh Sultanpuri	Mohammed Rafi
Mehlon Ke Khwab	"Is Duniya Mein Sabse Achchhi Cheez"	S. Mohinder	Raja Mehdi Ali Khan	Asha Bhosle
Miss Goodnight	"Don't Say Good Night"	Hansraj Behl	Prem Dhawan	solo
Miya Bibi Razi	"Tune Le Liya Hai Dil, Ab Kya Hoga"	S. D. Burman	Shailendra	Mohammed Rafi
Mohabbat Ki Jeet	"Yeh Rut Hain Suhani, Kar Le Pyaar"	Mohammed Shafi	S. R. Saaz	solo
Mohabbat Ki Jeet	"Yeh Chand Yeh Sitare"	Mohammed Shafi	S. R. Saaz	solo
Mud Mud Ke Na Dekh	"Aao Aao Ladkiwalo"	Hansraj Behl	Prem Dhawan	Asha Bhosle
Naache Nagin Baaje Been	"Khadi Re Khadi Re Kab Se Dekh"	Chitragupt	Majrooh Sultanpuri	Mohammed Rafi
Pedro	"Liya Dil Mein Chhupa"	Bulo C. Rani	Khawar Zaman	solo
Pedro	"Ae Babu Zara Sun Sun"	Bulo C. Rani	Khawar Zaman	solo
Police Detective	"Ae Mere Dil Churannewale"	Chitragupt	Prem Dhawan	Mohammed Rafi
Rickshawala	"Pandit Ho Ya Laala, Ya Gandhi Topiwala"	N. Dutta	Jan Nisar Akhtar	Mohammed Rafi
Rickshawala	"Neeli Saadi Sunehra Jhampar"	N. Dutta	Jan Nisar Akhtar	Asha Bhosle
Road No. 303	"Dil Gaya Toh Kahan Gaya"	C. Arjun	Naqsh Lyallpuri	solo
Road No. 303	"Sun Lo Meherbaan, Jeena Mushkil Yahan"	C. Arjun	Naqsh Lyallpuri	solo
Saranga	"Tum Kitne Sundar Saajan"	Sardar Malik	Bharat Vyas	solo
Saranga	"Na Toh Priyatam Hi Mile"	Sardar Malik	Bharat Vyas	solo
Saranga	"Maa Teri Mamta"	Sardar Malik	Bharat Vyas	solo
Saranga	"Chhe Chhe Janmon Ki Samadhi Hain"	Sardar Malik	Bharat Vyas	Hemant Kumar
Shan-e-Hind	"Pehli Baar Mili Jo Ankhe"	Sudipta	Pratap	solo
Shan-e-Hind	"Dwar Pe Tere Aayi Mai"	Sudipta	Pratap	solo
Shan-e-Hind	"Mere To Jivan Naiya Ki"	Sudipta	Pratap	solo
Shan-e-Hind	"Dhire Dhire Dabe Paanv Se"	Sudipta	Pratap	solo
Shan-e-Hind	"Zindagi Zindadili Ka Nam Hai Zindagi"	Sudipta	Naqsh Lyallpuri	solo
Superman	"Thodi Thodi Gori Hai"	Nisar Bazmi	Farooq Kaiser	Mohammed Rafi
Zimbo Shehar Mein	"Mausam Bada Rangeela"	Chitragupt	Prem Dhawan	solo
Zimbo Shehar Mein	"Dil Hai Tera Deewana"	Chitragupt	Prem Dhawan	solo
Zimbo Shehar Mein	"Dekh Mera Dil Na Jala"	Chitragupt	Prem Dhawan	Mohammed Rafi

=== 1961 ===
Film	Song	Composer(s)	Writer(s)	Co-artist(s)
Bada Aadmi	"Deewane Aa Zara Nazren Mila"	Chitragupt	Prem Dhawan	solo
Bahgwan Balaji	"Chando Chandaniya Jaisi Hai Tu"	P. Nageswara Rao	Saraswati Kumar Deepak	Mahendra Kapoor
Dark Street	"Ajab Hai Is Duniya Ke Raaz"	Dattaram Wadkar	Gulshan Bawra	solo
Dekhi Teri Bombai	"Dil Ko Bachana Aji"	Vinod	Aziz Kashmiri	solo
Diamond King	"Bas Mein Nahin Ji Dil"	Bipin Dutta	Kaif Irfani	Manna Dey
Howrah Express	"Nazren Mila Ja, Dil Mein Sama Jaa"	B. N. Bali	Khawar Zaman	solo
Hum Hindustani	"Tu Laage Mora Balma"	Usha Khanna	K. Manohar	Mukesh
Hum Matwale Naujawan	"Meri Gali Chhokre Ji Aaya Na Karo"	Chitragupt	Majrooh Sultanpuri	Mohammed Rafi
Hum Matwale Naujawan	"Beete Nahin Baat Sanam"	Chitragupt	Majrooh Sultanpuri	Mukesh
Kaanch Ki Gudiya	"Aai Hun Badi Aas Liye Sharn Tumhari"	Suhrid Kar	Shailendra	solo
Kaanch Ki Gudiya	"Koi Bacha Lo Mujhko Bacha Lo"	Suhrid Kar	Shailendra	solo
Khiladi	"Hato Hato Jao Ji Jao"	Shardul Kwatra	Prem Dhawan	Mohammed Rafi
Kismet Palat Ke Dekh	"Koi Gori Gulab Si Ladki"	Gunjan	Akhtar Romani	Mohammed Rafi
Krorepati	"Kaabul Ki Main Naar"	Shankar–Jaikishan	Hasrat Jaipuri	Kishore Kumar
Matlabi Duniya	"Nahne Munhe Chalo Chalein"	Sushant Banerjee	Ramesh Gupta	solo
Miss Chalbaaz	"Rock & Rola" (female)	Jimmy		solo
Miss Chalbaaz	"Ya Jamdasra Dilbara Makwa"	Jimmy		solo
Mr. India	"Dekha Na Jaaye"	G. S. Kohli	Jan Nisar Akhtar	solo
Mr. India	"Main Maachis Ki Tili"	G. S. Kohli	Jan Nisar Akhtar	solo
Passport	"Nazar Ka Jhuk Jaana"	Kalyanji–Anandji	Qamar Jalalabadi	solo
Passport	"Tauba Tauba Ho Tauba Meri Jaan"	Kalyanji–Anandji	Qamar Jalalabadi	solo
Passport	"Ja Raha Hai Kyon Deewane"	Kalyanji–Anandji	Qamar Jalalabadi	solo
Piya Milan Ki Aas	"Picnic Mein Tiktik Karti Jhoome Maston Ki Toli"	S. N. Tripathi	Bharat Vyas	Manna Dey
Pyar Ki Dastan	"Kahan Chali Re Kahan Chali"	Shauqat Dehlvi Nashad	Agha Sarvar	Mohammed Rafi
Pyar Ki Dastan	"Chakai Ke Chakdum Aaya Diwana"	Shauqat Dehlvi Nashad	Agha Sarvar	Mohammed Rafi
Pyar Ki Pyas	"Mere Godi Mein Gopala"	Vasant Desai	Bharat Vyas	Lata Mangeshkar
Pyar Ki Pyas	"Bolo Woh Hai Kiska Desh"	Vasant Desai	Bharat Vyas	Lata Mangeshkar, Manna Dey, Baby Renu
Pyase Panchhi	"Babu Bol Kaisa Roka Humne Dhoondha"	Kalyanji–Anandji	Qamar Jalalabadi	Manna Dey
Razia Sultana	"Chali Jaati Chhabeliya"	Lachhiram Tomar	Asad Bhopali	solo
Razia Sultana	"Allah Kasam Aapse Hum Door Nahin"	Lachhiram Tomar	Asad Bhopali	Asha Bhosle
Room No. 17	"Nazar Nazar Se Bijliya Girate Aa Rahe Hain Woh"	Bulo C. Rani	Anwar Farukhabadi, Aziz Kashmiri, Sartaj Rahmani	solo
Saaya	"Dhoke Mein Na Tum Aana"	Ran Ganguly	Khawar Zaman	solo
Shola Aur Shabnam	"Agar Dil Dil Se Takraye Toh Afsana Bana Daale"	Khayyam		Manna Dey, Mohammed Rafi
Shola Aur Shabnam	"Mathura Shyam Chale"	Khayyam	Ram Murthy	Manna Dey, Kumudini
Tel Malish Boot Polish	"Lo Aaya Japanwala"	Chitragupt	Prem Dhawan	Mohammed Rafi
Warrant	"Nigahon Mein Yeh Mastiyan Kyun"	Roshan	Prem Dhawan	solo
Wazir-e-Azam	"Kahe Kya Nazar Se Nazar"	Robin Banerjee	Hairat Sitapuri	solo
Wazir-e-Azam	"Zara Dekh Sambhal Ke Chal"	Robin Banerjee	Hairat Sitapuri	solo
Zabak	"Teri Taqdeer Ka Sitara"	Chitragupt	Prem Dhawan	Mohammed Rafi, S. Balbir

=== 1962 ===
Film	Song	Composer(s)	Writer(s)	Co-artist(s)
Ankh Micholi	"Tumhi Ne Chhup Chhup Ke Dil Ko Uchhala"	Chitragupt	Majrooh Sultanpuri	solo
Baghdad Ki Raaten	"Teri Nazar Meri Nazar"	Dilip Dholakia	Prem Dhawan	solo
Baghdad Ki Raaten	"Bach Bach Ke Jao Na"	Dilip Dholakia	Prem Dhawan	solo
Baghdad Ki Raaten	"Kisi Se Pyar Ho To, Dil Bekraar Ho To"	Dilip Dholakia	Prem Dhawan	solo
Baghdad Ki Raaten	"Sun Lo Kehate Hai Kya Ye Najare"	Dilip Dholakia	Prem Dhawan	Mohammed Rafi
Dr. Vidya	"Aaye Hain Dilruba, Are Tujhko Kya"	S. D. Burman	Majrooh Sultanpuri	Asha Bhosle
Gangu	"Kya Kaha Jara Phir Kaho"	Kalyanji–	Prem Dhawan	Subir Sen
Gangu	"Mehfil Hai Aaj Rang Mein"	Kalyanji–	Prem Dhawan	Suman Kalyanpur
Gangu	"Yeh Gora Gora Mukhda"	Kalyanji–	Prem Dhawan	Mohammed Rafi
Half Ticket	"Aankhon Mein Tum"	Salil Chowdhury	Shailendra	Kishore Kumar
Neeli Aankhen	"Dekhiye Na Is Tarah Jhoom Ke"	Dattaram Wadkar	Gulshan Bawra	solo
Sachche Moti	"Arre O Deewane, Khushi Ke Zamane, Phir Nahin Aane"	N. Dutta	Sahir Ludhianvi	solo
Sachche Moti	"Mere Munne Re, Seedhi Raah Pe Chalna"	N. Dutta	Sahir Ludhianvi	solo
Sahib Bibi Aur Ghulam	"Chale Aao Chale Aao"	Hemant Kumar	Shakeel Badayuni	solo
Sahib Bibi Aur Ghulam	"Na Jao Saiyan Chhuda Ke Baiyan"	Hemant Kumar	Shakeel Badayuni	solo
Sahib Bibi Aur Ghulam	"Piya Aiso Jiya Men Samaya Gao"	Hemant Kumar	Shakeel Badayuni	solo
Shiv Parvati	"Mora Lagae Re"	S. N. Tripathi	Prem Dhawan	Asha Bhosle
Son of India	"Mujhe Huzoor Tumse Pyaar Hai"	Naushad	Shakeel Badayuni	solo

=== 1963 ===
Film	Song	Composer(s)	Writer(s)	Co-artist(s)
Aaj Aur Kal	"Takht Na Hoga, Taaj Na Hoga"	Ravi	Sahir Ludhianvi	Mohammed Rafi, Manna Dey
Awara Abdulla	"O Awara Abdullah"	N. Dutta	Asad Bhopali	Mohammed Rafi
Awara Abdulla	"O Awara Abdullah" (reprise)	N. Dutta	Asad Bhopali	Mohammed Rafi
Awara Abdulla	"Hum Hain Awara Toh Kya Hain"	N. Dutta	Asad Bhopali	Mohammed Rafi
Band Master	"Teri Nazar Mein Main Rahun"	Chitragupt	Prem Dhawan	Mohammed Rafi
Ek Tha Alibaba	"Ya Ilaahi Tauba Tauba"	Hansraj Behl	Prem Dhawan	solo
Godaan	"O Bedardi Kyun Tadpaaye Jiyara"	Ravi Shankar	Anjaan	Mahendra Kapoor
Grihasti	"Ding Dong Ding Dong Ding Lala"	Ravi	Shakeel Badayuni	solo
Jungle Boy	"Sanson Ki Mehki Hawayen"	Suresh Kumar, Talwar	Anjaan	solo
Jungle Boy	"Dagmaga Rahe Qadam Jawaani Ke"	Suresh Kumar, Talwar	Anjaan	solo
Pareeksha	"Sapnon Mein Aanewala Aaya Bahaar Ban Kar"	S. N. Tripathi	S. R. Raaz	solo
Pareeksha	"Jabse Uljhe Nainwa"	S. N. Tripathi	S. R. Raaz	solo
Pareeksha	"Badriya Chhebe Kari Koyaliya"	S. N. Tripathi	S. R. Raaz	solo
Pareeksha	"Gham Ki Aag Mein"	S. N. Tripathi	S. R. Raaz	Mahendra Kapoor

=== 1964 ===
Film	Song	Composer(s)	Writer(s)	Co-artist(s)
Chakravarty Vikramaditya	"Oh Ho Kaun Se Rang Mein Aaha Baware"	P. Nageswara Rao	Saraswati Kumar Deepak	solo
Chandi Ki Deewar	"Mohe Laa De Chunariya Laal"	N. Dutta	Sahir Ludhianvi	Suman Kalyanpur
Dooj Ka Chand	"Binati Suno Mera Avadhpur Ke Basaiya"	Roshan	Sahir Ludhianvi	Manna Dey
Haqdaar	"Agar Hum Tumhen Dekhkar Muskura De"	Bulo C. Rani	N/A	Manna Dey, Mohammed Rafi, Nirmala Devi
Mahasati Behula	"Nahin Chahiye Nagraj Mujhe"	Shivram Krishnan	Bharat Vyas	solo
Marvel Man	"Dil Ko Mere Na Jaane Kya Ho Gaya"	Robin Banerjee	Yogesh	solo
Tarzan and Captain Kishore	"O Mister Johnny Mizaaj Kaisa Hai"	Manoharlal–S. Krishnan	Akhtar Romani, Farad	Mahendra Kapoor
Ziddi	"Champakali Dekho Jhuk Hi Gayi"	S. D. Burman	Hasrat Jaipuri	Mohammed Rafi
Bidesiya	"Rimjhim Barshela Sawanwa"	S. N. Tripathi	Ram Moorti Chaturvedi	Koumudi Mazumdar

=== 1965 ===
Film	Song	Composer(s)	Writer(s)	Co-artist(s)
Aasmaan Mahal	"Ae Raat Zara Aahista Guzar"	Jag Phool Kaushik	N/A	Madhukar
Bhool Na Jaana	"Mere Humnasheen Mere Humnawaan"	Daan Singh	Hariram Acharya	solo
Chhupa Rustam	"Ek Dil Tha Mera Jo Tera Ho Gaya"	Bulo C. Rani		solo
Chhupa Rustam	"Madam Moti"	Bulo C. Rani		N/A

=== 1966 ===
Film	Song	Composer(s)	Writer(s)	Co-artist(s)
Duniya Hai Dilwalon Ki	"Zara Suno Suno O Miss Leela"	Jimmy	Noor Devasi	Minoo Purushottam
Hum Kahan Jaa Rahe Hain	"Rukh Pe Paudar, Lab Pe Surkhi"	Basant Prakash	Qamar Jalalabadi	Mahendra Kapoor
Husn Ka Ghulam	"Paseena Pochhiye Ab Na Ghabdaiye"	Robin Banerjee	Yogesh	Usha Mangeshkar
Professor X	"Aana Tha Aitwar Ko"	S. Mohinder	Anand Bakshi	Mohammed Rafi
Sushila	"Gori Milna Ho Milna"	C. Arjun	Jan Nisar Akhtar	Mohammed Rafi
Uski Kahani	"Aaj Ki Kali Ghata"	Kanu Roy	Kaifi Azmi	solo

=== 1967 ===
Film	Song	Composer(s)	Writer(s)	Co-artist(s)
Awara Ladki	"Bacha Ke NazaNazar"	Dhaniram	N/A	solo
Awara Ladki	"Zaalim Pyaar Zaalim Pyaar"	Dhaniram	N/A	solo
Awara Ladki	"Left Right, Left Right"	Dhaniram	Kaif Irfani	S. Balbir
Hamare Gam Se Mat Khelo	"Yeh Khamoshi Kyon, Yeh Madhoshi Kyon"	Jaidev	Nyaya Sharma	solo
Pyaar Ki Baazi	"Nazar Bhar Dekhat"	Jimmy	Indeevar	solo
Pyaar Ki Baazi	"Humein Pyaar Karne Na Dega Yeh Zamana"	Jimmy	Indeevar	Mohammed Rafi

=== 1968 ===
Film	Song	Composer(s)	Writer(s)	Co-artist(s)
Kaafir	"Kabhi Kabhi Mere Din Mein"	Khayyam	Sahir Ludhianvi	solo
Veer Balak	"Sona Sona Kya Karte Ho"	Kersi Mistry	Navin Shah	B. Kamlesh Kumari
Veer Balak	"Matrubhoomi Ka Aaya Bulawa"	Kersi Mistry	Navin Shah	solo

=== 1969 ===
Film	Song	Composer(s)	Writer(s)	Co-artist(s)
Hanumaan Chalisa	"Koi Keh De Re"	Ravi	N/A	solo

== 1970s ==
=== 1971 ===
Film	Song	Composer(s)	Writer(s)	Co-artist(s)
Anubhav	"Mujhe Jaan Na Kaho"	Kanu Roy	Gulzar	
Anubhav	"Mera Dil Jo Mera Hota"	Kanu Roy	Gulzar	
Anubhav	"Koi Chupke Se Aake"	Kanu Roy	Kapil Kumar	
Jwala	"Haule Haule Ek Bhi Na Ghungroo Bole"	Shankar–Jaikishan	Rajendra Krishan	Lata Mangeshkar, Sudha Malhotra
Raat Ki Uljhan	"Gul Khile Na Khile"	Salil Chowdhury	Gulzar	Mohammed Rafi

=== 1972–present ===
Year	Film	Song	Composer(s)	Writer(s)	Co-artist(s)
1972	Midnight	"Tumsa Meet Mila, Dil Ka Phool Khila"	Subir Sen	N/A	Talat Mahmud
1972	Midnight	"Teri Yaad Mein Sajan, O Sajan"	Subir Sen	N/A	solo
1977	Subah Zaroor Aayegi	"Gori Milna Ri Milna Ri"	C. Arjun	Jan Nisar Akhtar	Mohammed Rafi
1978	Insaan Aur Insaan	"Lat Uljhi Hai Suljhaa De"	Ratandeep–Hemraj	Tajdar Taj	solo
1983	Film Hi Film	"Hum Khoob Jante Hai"	Shankar–Jaikishan	Hasrat Jaipuri	Mohammed Rafi, Suman Kalyanpur
1989	Salaam Bombay!	"Mera Naam Chin Chin Chu"	O. P. Nayyar	Qamar Jalalabadi	solo
2005	Bluffmaster!	"Tadbeer Se Bigdi Hui" (Destiny Mix)	Sameeruddin, S. D. Burman	Sahir Ludhianvi	solo
2006	The Namesake	"Jhiri Jhiri Choitali Batashe"	Sudhin Dasgupta		solo

== Bengali film songs ==
Year	Film	Song	Composer(s)	Writer(s)	Co-artist(s)
1957	Harano Sur	"Tumi Je Amar"	Hemanta Mukherjee	Gauriprasanna Mazumdar	solo
1957	Prithibi Amare Chay	"Tumi Bina E Phagun"	Nachiketa Ghosh	Gauriprasanna Mazumdar	solo
1957	Prithibi Amare Chay	"Nishiraat Baaka Chand"	Nachiketa Ghosh	Gauriprasanna Mazumdar	solo
1958	Dak Harkara	"Kacher Churir Chhotay"	Sudhin Dasgupta	Tarashankar Bandyopadhyay	solo
1958	Indrani	"Durer Tumi Aaj"	Nachiketa Ghosh	Gauriprasanna Mazumdar	solo
1958	Indrani	"Ogo Sundor Jano Naki"	Nachiketa Ghosh	Gauriprasanna Mazumdar	solo
1958	Indrani	"Jhonok Jhonok Konok Kakon"	Nachiketa Ghosh	Gauriprasanna Mazumdar	solo
1958	Indrani	"Neer Chhotto Khoti Nei"	Nachiketa Ghosh	Gauriprasanna Mazumdar	Hemanta Mukherjee
1958	Joutuk	"Aha Rong Dhorechhe Phule Phule"	Hemanta Mukherjee	Gauriprasanna Mazumdar	solo
1959	Sonar Harin	"Tomar Duti Chokhe"	Hemanta Mukherjee	Gauriprasanna Mazumdar	solo
1959	Sonar Harin	"Ei Mayabi Tithi"	Hemanta Mukherjee	Gauriprasanna Mazumdar	solo
1959	Gali Thekey Rajpath	Tere Liye Aaya"	Sudhin Dasgupta	Nakshal Puri	solo
1961	Swaralipi	"Ami Notun Shopon Dekhi"	Hemanta Mukherjee	Gauriprasanna Mazumdar	solo
1961	Swaralipi	"Ami Shunechhi Tomari Gaan"	Hemanta Mukherjee	Gauriprasanna Mazumdar	solo
1961	Swaralipi	"Ei Raat Holo Koto Sundor"	Hemanta Mukherjee	Gauriprasanna Mazumdar	solo
1961	Swaralipi	"Gaaner Swaralipi"	Hemanta Mukherjee	Gauriprasanna Mazumdar	solo
1961	Swaralipi	"Ke Daake Amay"	Hemanta Mukherjee	Gauriprasanna Mazumdar	solo
1961	Swaralipi	"Se To Bolechhilo"	Hemanta Mukherjee	Gauriprasanna Mazumdar	solo
1961	Swaralipi	"Sona Ghumalo Paara Juralo"	Hemanta Mukherjee	Gauriprasanna Mazumdar	solo
1963	Palatak	"Chinite Parini Bondhu"	Hemanta Mukherjee		Ruma Guha Thakurta
1963	Palatak	"Mon Je Amar Kemon Kemon Kare"	Hemanta Mukherjee		Ruma Guha Thakurta
1966	Badhubaran	"Amra Alor Shishu"	Kamal Dasgupta	Shyamal Gupta	solo

== Bengali Non-film songs ==
Year	Film	Song	Composer(s)	Writer(s)	Co-artist(s)
N/A	Single	"Jhiri Jhiri Choitali Batashe"	Sudhin Dasgupta	solo	

== Bhojpuri Film Songs ==
Year	Film	Song	Composer(s)	Writer(s)	Co-artist(s)
1963	Bidesiya	"Rimjhim Barshela Sawanwa"	S. N. Tripathi	Ram Moorti Chaturvedii	Koumudi Mazumdar
1963	Bidesiya	"Jaan Like Hatheli Par"	S. N. Tripathi	Ram Moorti Chaturvedii	Manna Dey
1965	Ayeel Basant Bahar	Tohre Naina Me Khoi Gaile	Hemant Kumar	Rammoorti Chaturvedi.	Manna Dey
1965	Ayeel Basant Bahar	Bhauji Jaise Bhaiya Mane	Hemant Kumar	Rammoorti Chaturvedi.	
