= List of mayors of Chennai =

The city of Chennai in Tamil Nadu, India is administered by the Corporation of Chennai headed by a Mayor. The Mayor is the first citizen of the city. The person is the chief of the Chennai Municipal Corporation. The Chennai Municipal Corporation has a history of 323 years and the Office of Mayor was formed in 1933. The corporation has been served by 49 different mayors as of 2025. Priya Rajan is the current mayor of Chennai.

The city is divided into 200 wards, each of them headed by a councillors who work under the Mayor. In addition to the 200 councilors, there are Deputy Commissioners and Heads of various departments and 15 Zonal officers.

== First mayoralty ==
The Corporation of Madras, the second oldest in the British Empire and the first outside the United Kingdom, was inaugurated on 29 September 1688 based on a Charter issued by James II, King of England. As per the provisions of the charter, Nathaniel Higginson, a member of the Fort St George Council, was appointed first mayor of the city. Higginson resigned after six months and was succeeded by John Littleton. Interrupted between 1746 and 1753 by the brief French occupation of Madras, the post of mayor survived with minor amendments till 1798.

The mayoralty of Madras was amended by the Charter of George I of 1727, Charter II of 1753 and the Company's Charter of 1787. Elections to the office were held annually - from 1688 to 1726, the appointment was made on 29 September, from 1727 to 1753, on 20 December and from 1753 to 1798, on the first Tuesday of every December. From 1798 the Mayor and Aldermen sat in the Recorder's Court until 1801, when that Court was merged in the Supreme Court of Judicature. The post of mayor was revived only in 1933.

=== List of mayors ===
#	Name	Took office	Left office	Term (Note: The ordinal number of the term being served by the person specified in the row in the corresponding period)
1	Nathaniel Higginson	29 September 1688	March 1689	1
2	John Littleton	March–April 1689	1690	1
3	Thomas Wavell	1690	July 1691	1
4	William Fraser	July 1691	September 1691	1
5	William Fraser	September 1691	September 1692	2
6	John Styleman	September 1692	September 1693	1
7	John Styleman	September 1693	September 1694	2
8	John Styleman	September 1694	September 1695	3
9	Thomas Wright	September 1695	September 1696	1
10	Thomas Wright	September 1696	September 1697	2
11	Nathaniel Stone	September 1697	September 1698	1
12	Daniel Chardin	September 1698	September 1707	
13	Jeremiah Harrison	September 1707	September 1709	
14	Robert Raworth	September 1709	September 1711	
15	William Jennings	September 1711	September 1713	
16	Bernard Benyon	1713	1715	
17	Thomas Cooke	1715	1717	
18	John Legg	1717	1718	
19	Richard Horden	1718	1720	
20	Richard Benyon	1720	1721	
21	Joshua Draper	1721	1722	
22	Catesby Oadham	1721	1723	
23	George Sitwell	1722	1724	
24	James Hubard	1724	1725	
25	Francis Rous	1725	1727	
26	Captain John Powney	17 August 1727	20 December 1727	
27	Francis Rous	20 December 1727	20 December 1730	
28	Thomas Weston	20 December 1730	20 December 1731	
29	William Monson	20 December 1731	20 December 1732	
30	John Bulkley	1732	1732	
31	Paul Foxley	1732	1733	
32	Samuel Parkes	1733	1734	
33	Hugh Naish	1734	1735	
34	John Saunders	1735	1736	
35	Holland Goddard	1736	1737	
36	Captain Rawson Hart	1737	1738	
37	Edward Fouke	1738	1739	
38	Samuel Harrison	1739	1740	
39	Captain Timothy Tullie	1740	1741	
40	Sidney Foxall	1741	1742	
41	Cornelius Goodwin	1742	1743	
42	Henry Powney	1743	1744	
43	Samuel Greenhaugh	1744	1745	
44	Sidney Foxall	1745	1746	
45	Joseph Fouke	1746	September 1746	
Mayoralty suspended due to French occupation of Madras (1746-1753)
46	Cornelius Goodwin	1753	1754	
47	William Percival	1753	1754	
48	Andrew Munro	December 1753	1755	
49	John Walsh	1755	1756	
50	George Mackay	1756	1757	
51	Andrew Ross	1757	1758	
52	Samuel Ardley	1758	1759	
53	Claud Russell	1759	1760	
54	Francis Taylor	1760	1761	
55	Peter Mariette	1761	1762	
56	John Lewin Smith	July 1762	December 1762	
57	Peter Mariette	December 1762	1763	2
58	John Debonnaire	1763	1764	
59	Thomas Powney	1764	1765	
60	Captain George Baker	1765	1765	
61	Claud Russell	1765	1766	
62	Edward Raddon	1766	1767	
63	Anthony Sadleir	1767	1768	
64	Charles Smith	1768	1769	
65	Edward Stracey	1769	1770	
66	Francis Jourdan	1770	1771	
67	John Hollond	1771	1772	
68	George Smith	1772	1773	
69	John Macpherson (resigned July 1773 and replaced by George Baker)	1773	1774	
70	George Savage	1774	1775	
71	James Hodges (resigned March 1775 and replaced by George Moubray)	1775	1776	
72	John Turing	1776	1777	
73	Andrew Majendie	1777	1778	
74	James Call	1778	1779	
75	George Proctor	1779	1780	
76	Edward John Hollond	1780	1781	1
77	Benjamin Roebuck	1781	1782	1
78	Edward Garrow	1782	1783	
79	William Webb	1783	1784	1
80	Sir John Menzies and James Call	1784	1785	
81	Philip Stowey	1785	1786	
82	Robert Ewing	1786	1787	
83	James Call	1787	1788	
84	John and Edward Hollond and Edward Garrow	1788	1789	2
85	William Webb	1789	1790	2
86	Vincentio Corbett and James Call	1790	1791	
87	Josias Porcher	1791	1792	
88	Andrew Ross	1792	1793	
89	John Mitford	1793	1794	
90	Henry Chichley Michell	1794	1795	
91	Benjamin Roebuck	1795	1796	2
92	James Daly	1796	1797	
93	William Dring	1797	1798	
94	William Abbot (in Recorder's Court)	1798	1799	
95	Alexander Cockburn (in Recorder's Court)	1799	1800	
96	Richard Chase (replaced March 1800 by Henry Sewell, who died July 1800 and was in turn replaced by Benjamin Roebuck) (in Recorder's Court)	1800	1801	
97	Richard Yeldham (in Recorder's Court)	1801	1802	

== Presidents ==
Between 1793 and 1856, municipal administration was in the control of Justices of Peace who also had judicial powers in the city. In 1856, the positions were abolished as per the Madras City Municipal Act XIV of 1856. The judges were replaced with three Municipal Commissioners from the civil service. The commissioners collected municipal taxes and enacted laws for the conservancy and improvement of the city. However, the system failed due to lack of financial accountability and the Municipal Corporation was revived in 1860 by the efforts of Sir Charles Trevelyan, Governor of Madras.

From 1886 onwards, a president was appointed to head the corporation and perform the duties of a mayor. The first president of the corporation was Lieutenant-Colonel G. M. J. Moore, who was then serving as military secretary to the governor of Madras. Presidents were generally appointed for a four-year term but this was reduced to one in 1910. Civil servant T. Raghavaiah was the first Indian to act as President of the Madras Corporation. The first to be appointed as full-time president was T. Vijayaraghavacharya in 1916. P. Theagaraya Chetty of the Justice Party, appointed in 1919, was the first to represent a political party.

#	Portrait	Name	Took office	Left office	Term
1		G. M. J. Moore	1886	1902	1
2		S. D. Pears	1902	1906	1
3		E. S. Lloyd	1906	1910	1
4		N. MacMichael (acting)	1910	1910	1
5		P. L. Moore	1910	1911	1
6		T. Raghavaiah (acting)	1911	1911	1
7		P. L. Moore	1911	1913	2
8		A. Y. G. Campbell (acting)	1913	1913	1
9		P. L. Moore	1913	1914	3
10		E. S. Lloyd	1914	1914	2
11		J. C. Molony	1914	1916	1
12		T. Vijayaraghavacharya	1916	1916	1
13		J. C. Molony	1916	1917	2
14		H. H. Burkitt	1917	1918	1
15		J. C. Molony	1918	1919	3
16		Muhammad Bazullah	1919	1919	1
17		P. Theagaraya Chetty	1919	1923	1
18		V. Thirumalai Pillai	1923	1924	1
19		Mohammad Usman	1924	1925	1
20		O. Thanikachalam Chetti	1925	1925	1
21		Sami Venkatachalam Chetty	1925	1926	1
22		G. N. Chetty	1926	1928	1
23		Arcot Ramaswamy Mudaliar	1928	1930	1
24		P. T. Kumarasamy Chetty	1930	1931	1
25		T. S. Ramaswamy Iyer	1931	1932	1
26		M. A. Muthiah Chettiar	1932	1933	1

== Mayors ==
=== Madras ===
#	Portrait	Name	Took Office	Left Office	Term
1		M. A. Muthiah Chettiar	8 March 1933	7 November 1933	1
2		W. W. Ladden	1933	1934	1
3 (1)		M. A. Muthiah Chettiar	1934	1935	2
4		Abdul Hameed Khan	1935	1936	1
5		K. Sriramulu Naidu	1936	1937	1
6		J. Shivashanmugam Pillai	1937	1938	1
7		K. Venkataswamy Naidu	1938	1939	1
8		S. Satyamurti	1939	1940	1
9		C. Basudev	May 1940	May 1941	1
10		G. Janakiram Chetty	May 1941	November 1941	1
11		V. Chakkarai Chettiar	1941	1942	1
12		C. Tadulinga Mudaliar	1942	1943	1
13		Syed Niamatullah	1943	1944	1
14		M. Radhakrishna Pillai	1944	1945	1
15		N. Sivaraj	1945	1946	1
16		T. Sundara Rao Naidu	1946	1947	1
17		U. Krishna Rao	1947	1948	1
18		S. Ramaswamy Naidu	1948	1949	1
19		P. V. Cherian	1949	1950	1
20		R. Ramanathan Chettiar	1950	1951	1
21		C. H. Sibghatullah	1951	1952	1
22		T. Chengalvorayan	1952	1953	1
23		B. Parameswaran	1953	1954	1
24		R. Munusamy	1954	1954	
25		M. A. Chidambaram	1954 (?)	1955	1
26		V. R. Ramanatha Iyer	1955	1956	1
27		K. N. Srinivasan	1956	1957	1
28		Tara Cherian	December 1957	November 1958	1
29		K. Kamalakannan	November 1958	April 1959	1
30		A. P. Arasu	April 1959	December 1959	1
31		M. S. Abdul Khader	1959	1960	1
32		V. Munusamy	1960	1961	1
33		G. Kuchelar	1961	1963	
34		R. Sivasankar Mehta	November 1963	March 1964	1
35		S. Krishnamurthy	1964	1965	1
36		C. Chitti Babu	1965	1966	1
37		M. Minor Moses	1965	1966	
38		Era Sambandham	1966	1967	1
39		Habibullah Baig	1967	1968	1
40		Velur D. Narayanan	1968	1969	1
41		V. Balasundaram	1969	1970	1
42		S. A. Ganesan	1970	1971	1
43		Kamakshi Jayaraman	1971	1972	1
44		R. Arumugam	1972	30 November 1973	1

From 1 December 1973 to 25 October 1996, the Corporation and Mayoralty were suspended. Before their re-establishment, on 17 July 1996, the city's name in English and other non-Tamil languages was changed from Madras to Chennai.

=== Chennai ===
#	Portrait	Name	Took Office	Left Office	Term
45		M. K. Stalin	25 October 1996	6 September 2002	1
(45)		M. K. Stalin	September 2001	June 2002	2
46		Karate R. Thiagarajan	October 2002	October 2006	1
47		M. Subramaniam	October 2006	September 2011	1
48		Saidai Sa. Duraisamy	25 October 2011	24 October 2016	1
Corporation / Mayoralty suspended (25 October 2016 - 3 March 2022)
49		Priya Rajan	4 March 2022	Incumbent	1
