= Aiyadurai Jesudasen Appasamy =

A. J. Appasamy
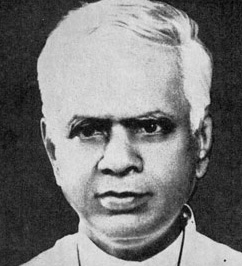
- Born: Ayyadurai Jesudasen Appasamy; 3 September 1891; Palayamkottai, Tamilnadu
- Died: 1975 (aged 84)
- Occupation: Bishop

Aiyadurai Jesudasen Appasamy (3 September 1891 – 1980) was an Indian Christian theologian, and bishop of the Church of South India in Coimbatore, Tamil Nadu. He was a member of the 'Rethinking Christianity Group', and sought to reconcile Christian with Hindu philosophies. He interpreted Christianity as 'bhaktimarga'.

== Early life and studies ==
Aiyadurai Jesudasen Appasamy was born in Palayamkottai Tamil Nadu (south India) on 3 September 1891, to Christian parents His father had been a Shaivite before coming to the Christian faith at the age of 24. A. J. Appasamy often wrote of the influence of his father and his family on him. After becoming a Christian his father studied both Christianity and Hinduism. In his 67th year he became consumed with a passion to see God, learnt meditation from a Hindu guru, began to practise yoga regularly, had mystical experiences, and emphasised the value of the prayer of dhyana (contemplation) as a method of attaining truth. His son, A.J. Appasamy, was aware of some danger but also of ‘the immense value’ of this view of prayer; he was convinced that this practice of yoga had made a profound, positive difference to his father's life.

In 1915 A. J. Appasamy went to study philosophy and religion in the U.S.A. at Harvard University, and later in Britain at Oxford University, where he received a doctorate of Philosophy. It seemed evident to Appasamy that ‘if the Christians in India are to make any impact upon national life, they must be well-educated men who are quite familiar with the literature of the country, though they may not follow the Hindu religion.’ He came to this conclusion from a comparison with the role of Christians in ancient Rome. The influence of ‘many great scholars and inspiring teachers’, such as J. N. Farquhar, B. H. Streeter, Friedrich von Hügel, William Temple, Friedrich Heiler and Rudolf Otto, led him to the conclusion ‘that we had a good deal to learn from the life and experience of the bhakti writers of India.’ Another influence which began at this time was that of the sadhu Sundar Singh, who visited Oxford in 1920. Appasamy came to know Sundar Singh well, and collaborated with B.H. Streeter in writing a book on him, The Sadhu (1921).

After returning to India in 1922 Appasamy became an editor of the Christian Literature Society. This enabled him to continue his studies, turning to Sanskrit texts as well as Tamil; for which he turned to Sanskrit pandits. He was particularly interested in ‘how Ramanuja had constructed into a theological system his deep personal experience of God.’

== Christian Ministry ==
From 1932 to 1936 Appasamy was teaching in Bishop's College in Calcutta (Kolkata). There, he made extra study of the neo-Hindu movements in India, such as the Brahmo Samaj and the Ramakrishna Mission.

After 1936 he worked several years in a village of seven hundred people at a night school for adults. He was also concerned in the IMC ( International Missionary Conference) in Tambaram in 1938. He associated himself with the ‘Rethinking Christianity Group’, of which Pandippedi Chenchiah and V. Chakkarai were leaders.

In 1946 he became an archdeacon.

From 1951 until his retirement in 1959 he served in the newly formed Church of South India as bishop in Coimbatore diocese, Tamil Nadu.

In his works Appasamy mentions all kinds of people: some as illustration, some to disagree with and some as examples to learn from. These are some people whom he admires: St. John, St. Paul, St. Augustine, Ramanuja, St. Bernard of Clairvaux, Manikkavacakar, St. Francis of Assisi, Julian of Norwich, Thomas à Kempis, Kabir, Luther, Tukaram, George Fox, John Wesley, John Henry Newman, H.A. Krishna Pillai, pandita Ramabai, M.K. Gandhi, C.F. Andrews, Albert Schweitzer, Sadhu Sundar Singh. Some with whom he often disagrees are Shankara, Eckhart, Suso, Chaitanya.

Appasamy was a forerunner of inter-faith dialogue and cooperation, and influenced theologians such as Paul D. Devanandan and M.M. Thomas. He had many Hindu, Muslim and Sikh friends.

He died in 1975.

== Select publications ==
In 1964 Appasamy listed his more important books. Here we follow his list, with some additions.

- [with B. H. Streeter] The Sadhu: a study in mysticism and practical religion (1921) [On Sundar Singh]
- An Indian Interpretation of Christianity (1924)
- Christianity as bhakti marga: a study of the Johannine doctrine of Love (1926; 2nd. ed. 1930). [Based on his Oxford University doctoral thesis of 1922, 'The Mysticism of Hindu Bhakti Literature especially in its relation to the Mysticism of the Fourth Gospel', with further study].
- Indian studies, edited by A. J. Appasamy (1926)
- Temple Bells: readings from Hindu religious literature, edited by A. J. Appasamy ... (1930) [Bhakti poems.]
- Church union: an Indian view (1930)
- What is moksa? A study in the Johannine doctrine of life (1931). [The conclusion of his enlarged thesis. He focuses on the Johannine doctrine of love and devotion with reference to Hindu bhakti literature. The Gospel and Letters of John would provide a basis for his later theology of Christian bhakti.]
- The Johannine doctrine of life. A study of Christian and Indian thought (1934)
- Christ in the Indian Church. A primer of Christian faith and practice (1935). [Explains Christianity simply for young people entering, or growing up in, the Church.]
- The cultural problem (1942) (=Oxford pamphlets on Indian affairs; 1)
- The Gospel and India's Heritage (1942). [Written for the National Christian Council, relating the Gospel to Indian traditions, especially bhakti.]
- Our main problem (1943)
- The Christian Task in Independent India (1951)
- Behold, I stand at the door and knock (1954)
- A Spiritual awakening in south India (1955)
- The Cross is Heaven. The life and writings of sadhu Sundar Singh (1956)
- Sundar Singh: a biography (1958)
- My theological quest (1964)
- Write the vision! Edwin Orr's thirty years of adventurous service (1964)
- Tamil Christian Poet: the life and writings of H. A. Krishna Pillai (1966)
- A Bishop's story (1969)
- The Theology of Hindu Bhakti (1970). [Mainly on the bhakti theology of Ramanuja and its relevance to Christian experience.]
- The Christian Bhakti of A.J. Appasamy – A Collection of his writings (1992). [Published by T.D. Francis, for the Christian Literature Society, on 1.‘Inner life’, 2. ‘Christian theology: an Indian perspective’, 3. ‘Hinduism’, 4. ‘Christ and Hinduism’.]
