= Ma. Subramanian =

Indian politician (born 1959)

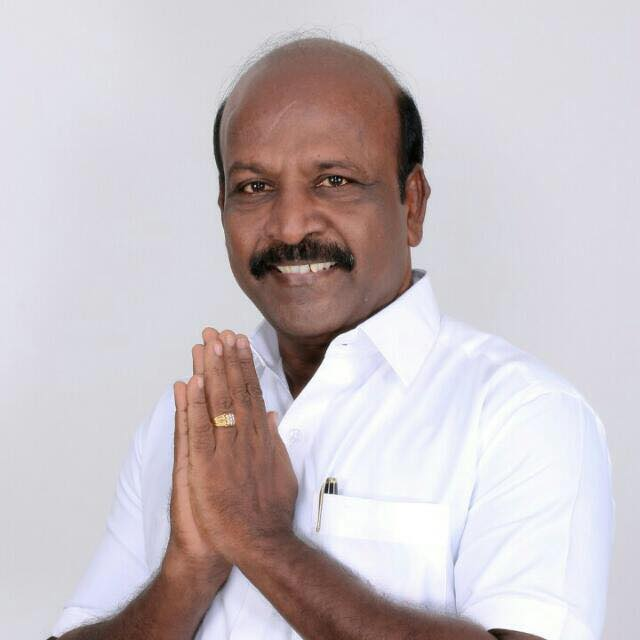

Cabinet Minister Government of Tamil Nadu
- In office 7 May 2021 – 5 May 2026
- Minister: Health, Health Education and Family Welfare
- Chief Minister: M. K. Stalin
- Preceded by: C. Vijayabaskar
- Succeeded by: K. G. Arunraj

Member of Tamil Nadu Legislative Assembly
- In office 19 May 2016 – 5 May 2026
- Preceded by: G. Senthamizhan
- Succeeded by: Arul Prakasam. M
- Constituency: Saidapet

47th Mayor of Chennai
- In office 2006 - 2011
- Preceded by: Karate R. Thiagarajan (acting)
- Succeeded by: Saidai Sa. Duraisamy

Personal details
- Born: 1 June 1959 (age 67) Vaniyambadi, Tamil Nadu, India
- Party: Dravida Munnetra Kazhagam

Ma. Subramanian (born 1 June 1959) is an Indian lawyer and politician served as the Minister for Health and Family Welfare of Tamil Nadu since 7 May 2021. He served as Mayor of Chennai from 2006 to 2011. He is a member of the Dravida Munnetra Kazhagam (DMK) party. He is a lawyer by profession.

== Early life ==
Subramanian completed his higher education in Saidapet Government Model Higher Secondary School and his bachelor's degree in an Open University course. He did his LLB from Havanur College of Law at Bangalore.

== Career ==
He joined the DMK in 1976 and became the chairman of Chennai Corporation during 1996–2006. He was elected mayor of Chennai in 2006. He is DMK's youth wing deputy general secretary and loyal to M K Stalin.

He became a practicing advocate in the Madras High Court in 1999. He is a member of Tamil Nadu Legislative Assembly, elected from Saidapet assembly constituency in the 2021 election. He beat former Chennai mayor Saidai Duraisamy.

=== Health minister ===
In 2021 he was appointed minister for Health and Family Welfare of Tamil Nadu.

In July 2021, Subramanian gave his MLA hostel and a month's supply of groceries to a couple who worked as daily wagers to treat their daughter who ate bleach powder, mistaking it for milk powder in March 2021 and lost weight gradually.

== Elections ==
2021 Tamil Nadu Legislative Assembly election: Saidapet
Party	Candidate	Votes	%	±%
DMK	Ma. Subramanian	80,194	50.38%	+3.2
AIADMK	Saidai Duraisamy	50,786	31.91%	−5.6
MNM	Snegapriya	13,454	8.45%	New
NTK	B. Suresh Kumar	10,717	6.73%	+5.11
AMMK	G. Senthamizhan	2,081	1.31%	New
NOTA	NOTA	1,158	0.73%	−1.38
Margin of victory		29,408	18.48%	8.80%
Turnout		159,169	57.05%	−2.52%
Rejected ballots		653	0.41%	
Registered electors		278,995		
DMK hold		Swing	3.20%	

2016 Tamil Nadu Legislative Assembly election: Saidapet
Party	Candidate	Votes	%	±%
DMK	Ma. Subramanian	79,279	47.18%	+3.23
AIADMK	C. Ponnayan	63,024	37.51%	−14.27
BJP	V. Kalidass	6,000	3.57%	+1.61
PMK	T. R. Sahadevan	5,913	3.52%	New
CPI	S. Elumalai	5,221	3.11%	New
NOTA	NOTA	3,541	2.11%	New
NTK	M. Manoharan	2,725	1.62%	New
Margin of victory		16,255	9.67%	1.85%
Turnout		168,018	59.57%	−10.84%
Registered electors		282,052		
DMK gain from AIADMK		Swing	-4.59%	
