= K. Saidai Kittu =

Indian politician

K. Saidai Kittu (died 4 August 2011) was an Indian politician and a Member of the Legislative Assembly of Tamil Nadu. He was elected to the Tamil Nadu legislative assembly as a Dravida Munnetra Kazhagam candidate from Saidapet constituency in the 1996 election. Although he was at first nominated to contest the constituency again for the DMK at the 2001 elections, it seems that he did not stand as the seat was won by another DMK candidate, V. Perumal.

Kittu died on 4 August 2011. He was survived by his wife, daughter and son.
