= Saidai Duraisamy =

Indian politician (born 1952)

Saidai S. Duraisamy
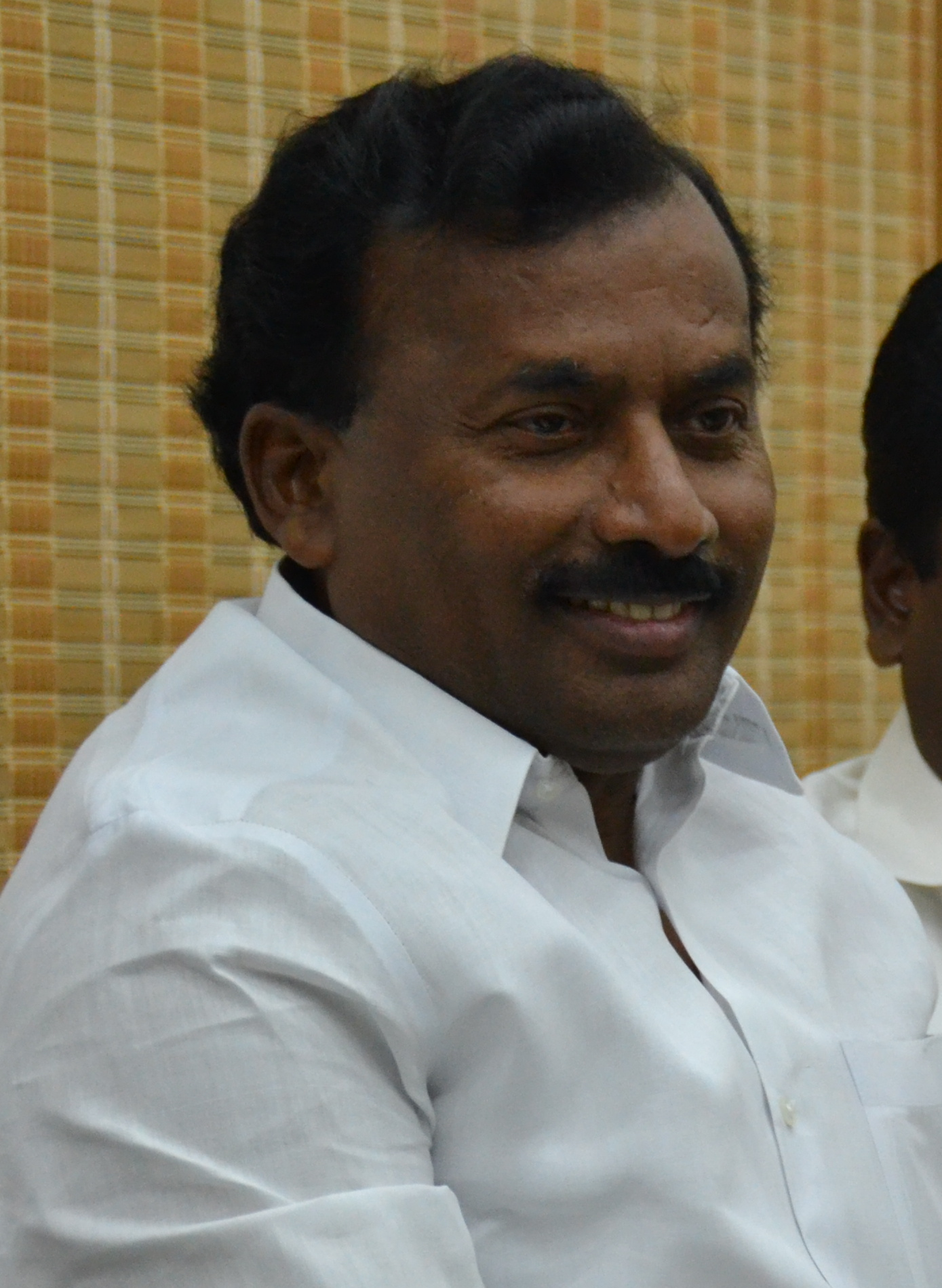

48th Mayor of Chennai
- In office 25 October 2011 – 24 October 2016
- Preceded by: M. Subramaniam
- Succeeded by: Priya Rajan

Member of the Tamil Nadu Legislative Assembly
- In office 31 December 1984 – 30 November 1989
- Preceded by: D. Purushothaman
- Succeeded by: R. S. Sridhar
- Constituency: Saidapet

Personal details
- Born: 16 February 1952 (age 74) Karur, Madras State (now in Karur District, Tamil Nadu, India
- Party: All India Anna Dravida Munnetra Kazhagam
- Spouse: Mallika Duraisamy
- Children: Vetri Duraisamy

Saidai Samiyappan Duraisamy (born 16 February 1952) is an Indian politician who served as a 48th Mayor of Chennai from 25 October 2011 to 24 October 2016. He was the first candidate from All India Anna Dravida Munnetra Kazhagam (AIADMK) to assume the role. He is the founder and chairman of Manidhaneyam IAS academy, a free coaching academy for the aspirants of the Civil Services Examination, in Tamil Nadu.

Duraisamy was elected to the Tamil Nadu Legislative Assembly in 1984 from Saidapet. He stayed away from politics after the demise of M. G. Ramachandran. He contested the 2011 assembly elections as a candidate for the AIADMK from the Kolathur constituency, which he lost. He contested the mayoral election of Chennai corporation, and became the first AIADMK mayor of the city, in October 2011, winning the election by a margin of over 5.19 lakh votes. He took the oath of office on 25 October.
