= P. Chenchiah =

Pandipeddi Chenchiah
- Born: 1886; Nellore, Andhra Pradesh, India
- Died: 19 April 1959 (aged 72–73); Madras, India
- Education: Madras Christian College
- Occupations: Theologian; jurist; writer
- Known for: Indianisation of Christianity, Interfaith dialogue, Theological writings
- Notable work: Rethinking Christianity in India
- Spouse: Matilda Raghaviah
- Children: 1 son, 4 daughters
- Relatives: Vengal Chakkarai (brother-in-law); V. Vasanthi Devi (grand-niece)

Pandipeddi Chenchiah (1886–1959), spelt also as Pandippedi Chenchiah, was a first generation indigenous convert to Christianity, a South Indian Christian theologian, a jurist, a radical thinker and part of the Rethinking Christianity in India group which worked for the Indianisation of Christianity. He published Rethinking Christianity in India, as an Indian Christian answer to the Hendrik Kraemer's The Christian Message in a Non-Christian World.

He and his brother-in-law Vengal Chakkarai were the founders of Madras Christo Samaj, influenced by Calcutta Christo Samaj which had been founded by K.C. Banerjee and J.G. Shome at the time that both Madras Presidency and Calcutta were British East India Company provinces - later part of British Raj.

== Biography ==
Chenchiah was born into a Hindu Brahmin home in Nellore, Andhra Pradesh (India), in 1886. He was the oldest of 12 children who grew up together. At the age of 15, Chenchiah converted to Christianity, along with his family and he was baptized by William Miller, a Scottish Missionary. Chenchiah went on to marry Matilda Raghaviah, and had 1 son and 4 daughters.

Chenchiah got his education from Madras Christian College which had grown enormously under William Miller, a Scottish missionary and the school principal. He received a degree in philosophy in 1906, where he received a gold medal for "proficiency in Philosophy." He then did his Bachelor of Laws degree (BL) in 1908, and a Master of Laws degree (ML) in 1913, from Madras Law College. He started his practice as an advocate of High Court of Madras, served as government servant in various offices. One source states that Chenchiah became the Judge of the district of Pudukottah, in the Madras Presidency (now Tamil Nadu), in 1928. Another source provides a later date, saying that Chenchiah became a Judge in 1935. According to V. Devasahayam, Chenchiah "retired from that position after refusing to yield to Government pressure to pass a verdict in their favor." Chenchiah rejoined the Madras High Court, and became the Chief Examiner of the Law exams for the Madras and Andhra Universities.

Chenchiah was a "voracious reader," and "it was through this interest in philosophy and ethics that Chenchiah grew in prominence in Christian circles." He pursued "active friendships with people of others faiths" and was involved in several formal and informal inter-faith discussions.

Chenchiah "wrote for two prominent Christian journals, Guardian and The Pilgrim," and served as the editor of The Pilgrim from 1949 to 1952. He was also on the editorial committee of the Christian Patriot, an Indian Christian nationalistic organ, between 1916 and 1924. He was a member of Board of Directors of YMCA, Madras(present Chennai). He also served as a member of Executive committee of the National Missionary Society. He was one of the founders of Madras Christo Samaj in Madras Presidency, and was actively associated with the Bangalore Continuation conference for the discussion association with problems of Indian Christian life. Apart from this, Chenchiah represented the South Indian Union Church at the International Missionary Conference at Jerusalem (1928) and was listed as a "Judge" at the International Missionary Conference at Tambaram (1938).

His most significant association was with the "Madras Rethinking Group," which produced the book Rethinking Christianity in India. Some have pointed out that it was William Miller, who played a major role in encouraging Chenchiah and his brother-in-law Vengal Chakkarai Chetti to rethink Christianity within the Indian context, possibly in an effort to integrate Hinduism and Christianity.

Chenchiah died on April 19, 1959, in Madras.

== Writings ==
Chenchiah was a prolific writer and wrote on several themes, but his main focus was on rethinking Christianity in the Indian context. His literary contributions are in the form of numerous articles he contributed to the periodicals, "The Patriot", "The Guardian," and two books he co-authored with others, "Rethinking Christianity in India", and "Āsramās Past and Present." Two of his most significant works are long reviews of two books. The first is his review written as an Indian reply to Hendrik Kraemer’s Barthian broadside, "The Christian Message in a Non-Christian World," appeared in 1938 on the eve of the International Missionary Council’s world conference at Tambaram, Madras, South India. This review is included in the book "Rethinking Christianity in India." His other major review of Marcus Ward’s "Our Theological Task" appeared in The Guardian 1947.

== Theology ==
Chenchiah is one of the Christian theologians featured in Robin Boyd's Introduction to Indian Christian Theology. In it, Boyd states that Chenchiah was primarily Christological in his thinking and focussed upon the integration of Hinduism and Christianity. Chenchiah was forced to resign his post as editor of ‘The Pilgrim’ after facing pressure from his promoting of Christians and Hindus praying together.

Samuel George’s 2013 book ‘’Christology’’ suggests that Chenchiah believed in an inclusive Christology.

David Muthukumar has suggested that Chenchiah’s theology was heavily influenced by his contemporary Master C. V. V. He was also seen as a successor to Brahmabandhav Upadhyay and Sundar Singh.

=== Rethinking Christianity in India ===
Chenchiah spoke against the Western Christian theology and Church practice; inspired by the teachings of Aurobindo Ghose, Teilhard de Chardin, and Master C.V.V, and also basing his thoughts on New Testament, he developed a new interpretation of Christian doctrine. He was one of the founders of Christo Samaj of Madras in 1908 with an aim of coordinating the country, the church, and the mission to the supreme purpose of Jesus Christ. Its leaders, including V. Chakkarai, S.K. George, P.A. Thangasami, and others met every year in South India to discuss political, economical, and religious issues. The members of this group later came to be known as The Rethinking Group.

He was instrumental in the formation of Rethinking Christianity Group in India, after the publication of Rethinking Christianity in India, in 1938, as Indian Christian's reply to Church-centered missiology of V.S. Azariah and Hendrik Kraemer's The Christian Message in a Non-Christian World, a Barthian theology. He led the group of Indian Christians along with G.V. Job, Vengal Chakkarai, and formed Rethinking Christianity Group in Madras that argued that Indian Christian community could not ignore the common Hindu heritage, its culture, and traditions.

In his article Rethinking Christianity in India, Chenchiah countered Kraemer's understanding of religion. He believed there are two possible realities at the core of every religion; one, a pivotal personality like Rama, Krishna, Jesus, or Budha; two, the discovery of a truth or principle as the all-inclusive nature of Brahman. According to Chenchiah, "A religion grows up around one or both of these realities, providing different means to comprehend the principle and follow and emulate the personality." [sic] Though Chenchaih agreed Kraemer's belief that religion is a human creation, both Chenchaih and Kraemer took different approaches to the study of religion; Kraemer on one hand, advocated a missionary's approach - the missionary perceives Christianity as the one means to understand God and studies other religions either out of curiosity or to affirm his conviction of Christianity's superiority - Christian revelation is the only means to understand God, an approach pivotal to the Kraemer's missiology; Chenchaiah on the other hand, being a second generation convert, seems to have grown dissatisfied with what the Church had to offer in response to the Indian context in which he lived and through which he was trying to understand the faith. He, like other Indian indigenous converts, studied other religions to rediscover the message of Christianity. In addition, Chenchiah seems to have had interest in comparing religions as systems and then showing what they have in common and where they differ.

=== New Creation ===
He considered Christianity to have represented a new stage in the evolution of man; hence, with the power of the Holy Spirit, Christians can become one with Him, and so become a "new creature." He advocated his entire life the policy of "Christian policy" - to live Christ is to preach Christ. According to him, human history has begun a new revolutionary chapter in Jesus - the fact of Christ is the birth of a new order in creation; Christianity is not primarily a doctrine of salvation but the announcement of the advent of a new creative order in Jesus - The Christian is a new creation - The Holy Spirit is the new cosmic energy - the kingdom of God is the new order - the children of God, the new type that Christ had inaugurated.

He was baptized along with his father, when he was a boy and raised as a Christian from infancy; however, he believed that the Christian faith must be open to receive new insights from Indian culture. He felt uneasy with Western concept of Church and advocated for a new indigenized Christ-ism from the gospels, using his Hindu perspective.

== Criticism ==
Critics pointed Chenchiah for giving undue weightage to the epic figures like Krishna and Rama of Hinduism. Both Chenchiah and Kraemer differed in the way Christian religion is differentiated with Christian faith. According to Chenchiah:

The Church does not teach us the mystery of a new birth. It detracts our attention from the central fact. It substitutes a new scheme to realize the Kingdom of God by a reformation of this world and of becoming the children of God by repentance and faith....Dr. Kraemer thinks that Hinduism and Buddhism differ from Christianity in that they are anthropo-centric while the latter is theo-centric ... he misses the essential point - in the practice of Christianity the Church depends on human effort as much as any other religion, though in theory the doctrine of grace is stressed.

== Works ==
=== Co-authored books ===
- Chenchiah, P., V. Chakkarai and A. N. Sudarisanam. Asramas: Past and Present. Indian Christian Book Club, 1941.
- Rethinking Christianity in India, edited by Devashayam, D. M. and A. N. Sudarisanam. Sudarisanam, 1938.

=== Select articles in newspapers and journals ===
- "Aspects of Nationalism," YMI (October 1917) 580–86.
- "The Challenge of Modern Hinduism to the Finality of the Christian Gospel." Guardian, 5 September 1940, 565–66.
- "Christ and Hinduism." Guardian, 22 March 1945, 91–92.
- "Christians and Yoga: A Study of the Technique of Realisation in Relation to the Aims and Objects of Christianity." Guardian, 23 March 1944, 136–37; 30 March 1944, 149–50; 6 April 1944, 162–63; 13 April 1944, 174–76; 20 April 1944, 186–87.
- "Christianity and Hinduism." NCCR 48 (March 1928) 119–38.
- "Conversions and Colleges." Guardian, 2 March 1944, 100–102.
- "The Cross and Resurrection." Guardian, 26 February 1959, 7; 16 April 1959, 124.
- "Dr. Kraemer, Inter-Religious Co-operation and Syncretism." Guardian, 29 March 1951. 152–53.
- "Editorial." The Pilgrim 8 (1 March 1949) 1–5.
- "Editorial Notes: I have resigned." The Pilgrim 11 (2 June 1952), 1–8.
- "Evangelism in Free India." Guardian, 16 August 1956, 326–27; 23 August 1956, 337–38.
- "The Future of Christianity in India." Guardian, 23 February 1928, 88–92; 26 June 1941, 292–93; 3 July 1941, 304–5; 10 July 1941, 316–17.
- "The Holy Spirit: Meaning and Significance of Christianity: Bible Studies." Guardian, 30 June 1932, 252; 14 July 1932, 276; 21 July 1932, 287; 28 July 1932, 300; 11 October 1932, 323.
- "Indian Christian Theological Task: Review and Restatement." Guardian, 2 January 1947, 6–7; 9 January 1947, 20–21; 16 January 1947, 29–31; 23 January 1947, 44–45; 30 January 1947, 57–58; 6 February 1947, 67–68; 13 February 1947, 77–79; 20 February 1947, 99–100; 6 March 1947. 110–12.
- "Indian Christians and Co-operation with Non-Christians." Guardian, 24 April 1958, 165–67; 1 May 1958, 175–77.
- "The Kingdom of God in India." Guardian, 4 May 1939, 260–61.
- "Master C. V. V. of Kumbakonam and Briktha Rahitha Tharaka. Raja Yoga: A Study of Recent Religious Development in India." Guardian, 14 October 1943, 484–85; 21 October 1943, 497–98; 28 October 1943, 509–10.
- "My Search for the Kingdom of God." Guardian, 8 February 1951. 65–66.
- "Problems of Conversion in New India: A Plea for Rethinking on Both Sides." Arunodayam, April 1954, 9–12; May 1954, 9–10.
- "Problems of the Indian Christian Community." Guardian, 22 January 1942, 28–30; 29 January 1942, 40–42; 5 February 1942, 52–53.
- "The Prospects of Christians in India." Guardian, 14 August 1958, 328–29; 21 August 1958, 336–37.
- "The Psychology of the Hindu Mind and the Presentation of the Christian Message." The Pilgrim 8 (March 1949) 11.
- "Religions and the World." Guardian, 27 November 1952, 383.
- "The Religious Situation in India." Guardian, 9 August 1956, 314.
- "Reviews: Professor Radhakrishnan and a Parliament of Religions." The Pilgrim 9 (4 December 1950) 20–21.
- "Revolution in Mission." Guardian, 11 July 1957, 274–75.
- "Samapada Chaturanga: Theology: Religion." The Pilgrim 9 (2 June 1950) 31–33.
- "Sri Aurobindo - His Message." Guardian, 9 September 1943, 424–25; 16 September 1943, 437–38.
- "The Theological Task in India." NCCR 63 (February 1943) 63–65.
- "Who Is Jesus? A Study of Jesus in Terms of the Creative Process." Guardian, 29 July 1943, 352–53; 5 August 1943, 364–65; 12 August 1943, 377–79; 19 August 1943, 389–92.

=== Other works ===
- A History of Telugu Literature.
- Problems of linguistic States in India.

Further bibliographic details can be found at Kumar (2013, pp. 289–291).

== See also ==
- Notable alumni - Madras Christian College - Theologians

== Sources ==
- Abraham, K. C. "Interpreting Christian Social Ethics in Modern India: A Comparative Evaluation of the Implications of the Theological Writings of Chenchiah and M. M. Thomas." [Doctoral Dissertation] PhD, Princeton Religion Research Center, 1978.
- Boyd, Robin. Introduction to Indian Christian Theology. ISPCK, 1969.
- Boyd, Robin. "The Philosophical context of Indian Christian Theology with Special Reference to P. Chenchiah." In Indian Voices in Today’s Theological Debate, edited by Horst Bürkle and Wolfgang M. W. Roth, 47–69. Lucknow, 1972.
- Devasahayam, V. (1988). Role of the Bible in the Writings of Pandipeddi Chenchiah (ThD). Senate of Serampore.
- Gurukul Theological Research Group. A Christian Theological Approach to Hinduism: Being Studies in the Theology of A. J. Appasamy, V. Chakkarai and P. Chenchiah. Christian Literature Society, 1956.
- Jathanna, Origen V. The Decisiveness of the Christ-Event and the Universality of Christianity in a World of Religious Plurality: With Special Reference to Hendrik Kraemer and Alfred George Hogg as well as to William Ernest Hocking and Pandipeddi Chenchiah. Lang, 1981.
- Kumar, Nigel Ajay (2013). What is Religion?: A Theological Answer, South Asia ed. Bangalore: SAIACS Press.
- Thangasamy, D. A. The Theology of Chenchiah: With Selections from His Writings. CISR, 1966.
- Wagner, Herwig. Erstgestalten einer einheimischen Theologie in Sudindien: Ein Kapitel indischer theologiegeschichte als kritischer Beitrag zur Definition von einheimischer Theologie. Kaiser, 1963.
