= K. Krishnamurthy =

Indian writer and publisher

- Born: 22 October 1915; Kottayam, British India
- Died: 6 March 2011 (aged 95); Chennai, Tamil Nadu
- Occupations: writer, political activist
- Spouse: Lakshmi Krishnamurti (1943–2009)

K. Krishnamurthy (22 October 1915 – 6 March 2011) was an Indian writer, publisher and political activist. He was the husband of Lakshmi Krishnamurti and son-in-law of Congress leader S. Satyamurti.

== Early life ==
Born in Kottayam on 22 October 1915, Krishnamurthy was educated in Kottayam, University College Trivandrum, Presidency College, Madras and Hertford College, Oxford. In 1940, Krishnamurthy returned to India in order to pursue a career as a writer but when his manuscript was rejected by major publishers he set up his own firm of booksellers and publishers.

== Personal life ==
Krishnamurthy married Lakshmi, the only daughter of Indian National Congress leader S. Satyamurti in 1943. The couple have three sons.
