= Saidapet Assembly constituency =

State Legislative Assembly Constituency in Tamil Nadu

Coordinates: 13.024°N 80.220°E

Saidapet
- Constituency No. 23 for the Tamil Nadu Legislative Assembly

Constituency details
- Country: India
- Region: South India
- State: Tamil Nadu
- District: Chennai
- Lok Sabha constituency: Chennai South
- Established: 1951
- Total electors: 2,04,177
- Reservation: None

Member of Legislative Assembly
- 17th Tamil Nadu Legislative Assembly
- Incumbent Arul Prakasam. M
- Party: TVK
- Alliance: TVK+
- Elected year: 2026

Saidapet is a constituency of the legislative assembly of the Indian state of Tamil Nadu. It covers the city of Saidapet in Chennai district and forms a part of Chennai South Lok Sabha constituency for elections to the Parliament of India. Its State Assembly Constituency number is 23. It is one of the 234 State Legislative Assembly Constituencies in Tamil Nadu, in India. Former chief minister M Karunanidhi represented this.

== Members of Legislative Assembly ==
=== Madras State ===
| Year | Winner | Party |
|---|---|---|
| 1952 | T. P. Elumalai and N. Ramakrishna Iyer | Indian National Congress |
| 1957 | A. S. Doraisami Reddiar | Indian National Congress |
| 1962 | Munu Adhi | Dravida Munnetra Kazhagam |
| 1967 | M. Karunanidhi | Dravida Munnetra Kazhagam |

=== Tamil Nadu ===
| Assembly | Year | Winner | Party |
|---|---|---|---|
| Fifth | 1971 | M. Karunanidhi | Dravida Munnetra Kazhagam |
| Sixth | 1977 | D. Purushothaman | Dravida Munnetra Kazhagam |
| Seventh | 1980 | D. Purushothaman | Dravida Munnetra Kazhagam |
| Eighth | 1984 | Saidai Sa. Duraisamy | All India Anna Dravida Munnetra Kazhagam |
| Ninth | 1989 | R. S. Sridhar | Dravida Munnetra Kazhagam |
| Tenth | 1991 | M. K. Balan | All India Anna Dravida Munnetra Kazhagam |
| Eleventh | 1996 | K. Saidai Kittu | Dravida Munnetra Kazhagam |
| Twelfth | 2001 | V. Perumal | Dravida Munnetra Kazhagam |
| Twelfth | 2001 by-election | Radha Ravi | All India Anna Dravida Munnetra Kazhagam |
| Thirteenth | 2006 | G. Senthamizhan | All India Anna Dravida Munnetra Kazhagam |
| Fourteenth | 2011 | G. Senthamizhan | All India Anna Dravida Munnetra Kazhagam |
| Fifteenth | 2016 | Ma. Subramanian | Dravida Munnetra Kazhagam |
| Sixteenth | 2021 | Ma. Subramanian | Dravida Munnetra Kazhagam |
| Seventeenth | 2026 | Arul Prakasam. M | Tamilaga Vettri Kazhagam |

== Election results ==
Vote share of winning candidates
| 2026 | 50.63% |
| 2021 | 50.38% |
| 2016 | 47.18% |
| 2011 | 51.78% |
| 2006 | 46.24% |
| 2001 | 48.13% |
| 1996 | 58.10% |
| 1991 | 57.37% |
| 1989 | 47.05% |
| 1984 | 49.35% |
| 1980 | 47.95% |
| 1977 | 36.70% |
| 1971 | 54.46% |
| 1967 | 60.96% |
| 1962 | 58.08% |
| 1957 | 55.14% |
| 1952 | 15.89% |

=== 2026 ===
2026 Tamil Nadu Legislative Assembly election: Saidapet
| Party | Candidate | Votes | % | ±% |
|---|---|---|---|---|
| TVK | Arul Prakasam. M | 81,205 | 50.63 | New |
| DMK | Subramanian. Ma | 52,691 | 32.85 | ▼17.53 |
| AMMK | Senthamizhan. G | 17,839 | 11.12 | ▲9.81 |
| NTK | Srividya. G | 5,918 | 3.69 | ▼3.04 |
| NOTA | NOTA | 924 | 0.58 | ▼0.15 |
| BSP | Kumaran. G.P | 571 | 0.36 | New |
| Independent | Raja. R | 258 | 0.16 | New |
| Independent | Yogaprakash. B | 158 | 0.10 | New |
| Independent | Valarmathi. P | 139 | 0.09 | New |
| NIP | Soundararajan. N | 132 | 0.08 | New |
| MGRMKKT | Parthiban. S | 131 | 0.08 | New |
| Independent | Gingston. M | 119 | 0.07 | New |
| Independent | Prithviraj. A | 93 | 0.06 | New |
| Independent | Prasad. N | 93 | 0.06 | New |
| Independent | Anand. S | 66 | 0.04 | New |
| Independent | Kandhasamy. R (alias) Babu | 64 | 0.04 | New |
| Margin of victory | | 28,514 | 17.78 | ▼0.70 |
| Turnout | | 1,60,401 | 78.56 | ▲21.51 |
| Registered electors | | 2,04,177 | | ▼74,818 |
| TVK gain from DMK | | Swing | ▲50.63 | |

=== 2021 ===
2021 Tamil Nadu Legislative Assembly election: Saidapet
| Party | Candidate | Votes | % | ±% |
|---|---|---|---|---|
| DMK | Ma. Subramanian | 80,194 | 50.38% | +3.2 |
| AIADMK | Saidai Duraisamy | 50,786 | 31.91% | −5.6 |
| MNM | Snegapriya | 13,454 | 8.45% | New |
| NTK | B. Suresh Kumar | 10,717 | 6.73% | +5.11 |
| AMMK | G. Senthamizhan | 2,081 | 1.31% | New |
| NOTA | NOTA | 1,158 | 0.73% | −1.38 |
| Margin of victory | | 29,408 | 18.48% | 8.80% |
| Turnout | | 159,169 | 57.05% | −2.52% |
| Rejected ballots | | 653 | 0.41% | |
| Registered electors | | 278,995 | | |
| DMK hold | | Swing | 3.20% | |

=== 2016 ===
2016 Tamil Nadu Legislative Assembly election: Saidapet
| Party | Candidate | Votes | % | ±% |
|---|---|---|---|---|
| DMK | Ma. Subramanian | 79,279 | 47.18% | +3.23 |
| AIADMK | C. Ponnayan | 63,024 | 37.51% | −14.27 |
| BJP | V. Kalidass | 6,000 | 3.57% | +1.61 |
| PMK | T. R. Sahadevan | 5,913 | 3.52% | New |
| CPI | S. Elumalai | 5,221 | 3.11% | New |
| NOTA | NOTA | 3,541 | 2.11% | New |
| NTK | M. Manoharan | 2,725 | 1.62% | New |
| Margin of victory | | 16,255 | 9.67% | 1.85% |
| Turnout | | 168,018 | 59.57% | −10.84% |
| Registered electors | | 282,052 | | |
| DMK gain from AIADMK | | Swing | -4.59% | |

=== 2011 ===
2011 Tamil Nadu Legislative Assembly election: Saidapet
| Party | Candidate | Votes | % | ±% |
|---|---|---|---|---|
| AIADMK | G. Senthamizhan | 79,856 | 51.78% | +5.54 |
| DMK | M. Msh Kumaar | 67,785 | 43.95% | New |
| BJP | V. Kalidass | 3,018 | 1.96% | +0.93 |
| MMKA | S. Chandrasekar | 878 | 0.57% | New |
| Margin of victory | | 12,071 | 7.83% | 4.23% |
| Turnout | | 154,225 | 70.41% | 4.29% |
| Registered electors | | 219,038 | | |
| AIADMK hold | | Swing | 5.54% | |

=== 2006 ===
2006 Tamil Nadu Legislative Assembly election: Saidapet
| Party | Candidate | Votes | % | ±% |
|---|---|---|---|---|
| AIADMK | G. Senthamizhan | 75,973 | 46.24% | New |
| PMK | C. R. Baskaran | 70,068 | 42.65% | −2.47 |
| DMDK | R. Venugopal | 11,675 | 7.11% | New |
| BJP | K. Ranganathan | 1,692 | 1.03% | New |
| Margin of victory | | 5,905 | 3.59% | 0.59% |
| Turnout | | 164,295 | 66.12% | 19.90% |
| Registered electors | | 248,483 | | |
| AIADMK gain from DMK | | Swing | -1.88% | |

=== 2001 ===
2001 Tamil Nadu Legislative Assembly election: Saidapet
| Party | Candidate | Votes | % | ±% |
|---|---|---|---|---|
| DMK | V. Perumal | 62,118 | 48.13% | −9.97 |
| PMK | C. R. Baskaran | 58,237 | 45.12% | +43.87 |
| MDMK | P. Subramani | 5,996 | 4.65% | +1.56 |
| Independent | M. Stephen Denis | 691 | 0.54% | New |
| Margin of victory | | 3,881 | 3.01% | −19.80% |
| Turnout | | 129,076 | 46.22% | −10.15% |
| Registered electors | | 279,266 | | |
| DMK hold | | Swing | -9.97% | |

=== 1996 ===
1996 Tamil Nadu Legislative Assembly election: Saidapet
| Party | Candidate | Votes | % | ±% |
|---|---|---|---|---|
| DMK | K. Saidai Kittu | 76,031 | 58.10% | +21.37 |
| AIADMK | Saidai Duraisamy | 46,178 | 35.29% | −22.09 |
| MDMK | M. R. Panneer Selvam | 4,036 | 3.08% | New |
| BJP | C. Ravindran | 1,869 | 1.43% | −0.43 |
| PMK | P. Venugopal | 1,638 | 1.25% | New |
| Margin of victory | | 29,853 | 22.81% | 2.16% |
| Turnout | | 130,871 | 56.37% | 2.90% |
| Registered electors | | 236,503 | | |
| DMK gain from AIADMK | | Swing | 0.72% | |

=== 1991 ===
1991 Tamil Nadu Legislative Assembly election: Saidapet
| Party | Candidate | Votes | % | ±% |
|---|---|---|---|---|
| AIADMK | M. K. Balan | 63,235 | 57.37% | +36.87 |
| DMK | R. S. Sridhar | 40,473 | 36.72% | −10.33 |
| PMK | P. Jayachandran | 3,038 | 2.76% | New |
| BJP | S. Nandakumar | 2,053 | 1.86% | New |
| JP | K. Krishnamoorthy | 715 | 0.65% | New |
| Margin of victory | | 22,762 | 20.65% | −5.89% |
| Turnout | | 110,216 | 53.47% | −12.64% |
| Registered electors | | 209,145 | | |
| AIADMK gain from DMK | | Swing | 10.33% | |

=== 1989 ===
1989 Tamil Nadu Legislative Assembly election: Saidapet
| Party | Candidate | Votes | % | ±% |
|---|---|---|---|---|
| DMK | R. S. Sridhar | 57,767 | 47.05% | −2.12 |
| AIADMK | Saidai Duraisamy | 25,178 | 20.51% | −28.84 |
| INC | S. M. Krishnan | 18,551 | 15.11% | New |
| AIADMK | V. J. M. Charles | 16,912 | 13.77% | −35.58 |
| Independent | K. Panchatcharam | 947 | 0.77% | New |
| Independent | Sadai V. Muthu | 919 | 0.75% | New |
| Margin of victory | | 32,589 | 26.54% | 26.36% |
| Turnout | | 122,784 | 66.11% | −0.26% |
| Registered electors | | 188,305 | | |
| DMK gain from AIADMK | | Swing | -2.30% | |

=== 1984 ===
1984 Tamil Nadu Legislative Assembly election: Saidapet
| Party | Candidate | Votes | % | ±% |
|---|---|---|---|---|
| AIADMK | Saidai Duraisamy | 52,869 | 49.35% | +3.41 |
| DMK | D. Purushothaman | 52,679 | 49.17% | +1.22 |
| Margin of victory | | 190 | 0.18% | −1.84% |
| Turnout | | 107,133 | 66.36% | 7.35% |
| Registered electors | | 166,613 | | |
| AIADMK gain from DMK | | Swing | 1.40% | |

=== 1980 ===
1980 Tamil Nadu Legislative Assembly election: Saidapet
| Party | Candidate | Votes | % | ±% |
|---|---|---|---|---|
| DMK | D. Purushothaman | 40,403 | 47.95% | +11.25 |
| AIADMK | Saidai Duraisamy | 38,706 | 45.94% | +16.37 |
| JP | A. Subramani | 4,870 | 5.78% | New |
| Margin of victory | | 1,697 | 2.01% | −5.12% |
| Turnout | | 84,261 | 59.01% | 8.73% |
| Registered electors | | 144,121 | | |
| DMK hold | | Swing | 11.25% | |

=== 1977 ===
1977 Tamil Nadu Legislative Assembly election: Saidapet
| Party | Candidate | Votes | % | ±% |
|---|---|---|---|---|
| DMK | D. Purushothaman | 27,160 | 36.70% | −17.77 |
| AIADMK | N. Kannan | 21,882 | 29.56% | New |
| JP | M. Nethaji | 16,339 | 22.08% | New |
| INC | K. Jagaveerapandian | 8,176 | 11.05% | −32.66 |
| Margin of victory | | 5,278 | 7.13% | −3.63% |
| Turnout | | 74,014 | 50.28% | −16.87% |
| Registered electors | | 148,319 | | |
| DMK hold | | Swing | -17.77% | |

=== 1971 ===
1971 Tamil Nadu Legislative Assembly election: Saidapet
| Party | Candidate | Votes | % | ±% |
|---|---|---|---|---|
| DMK | M. Karunanidhi | 63,334 | 54.46% | −6.5 |
| INC | N. Kamalingam | 50,823 | 43.70% | +6.13 |
| Independent | R. M. Annamlai | 1,034 | 0.89% | New |
| Independent | S. Krishnamurthy | 943 | 0.81% | New |
| Margin of victory | | 12,511 | 10.76% | −12.62% |
| Turnout | | 116,290 | 67.15% | −5.78% |
| Registered electors | | 177,248 | | |
| DMK hold | | Swing | -6.50% | |

=== 1967 ===
1967 Madras Legislative Assembly election: Saidapet
| Party | Candidate | Votes | % | ±% |
|---|---|---|---|---|
| DMK | M. Karunanidhi | 53,401 | 60.96% | +2.88 |
| INC | S. G. Vinayagamurthi | 32,919 | 37.58% | +0.18 |
| Independent | D. Saradambal | 665 | 0.76% | New |
| Margin of victory | | 20,482 | 23.38% | 2.69% |
| Turnout | | 87,602 | 72.93% | 6.93% |
| Registered electors | | 121,979 | | |
| DMK hold | | Swing | 2.88% | |

=== 1962 ===
1962 Madras Legislative Assembly election: Saidapet
| Party | Candidate | Votes | % | ±% |
|---|---|---|---|---|
| DMK | Munu Adhi | 37,123 | 58.08% | New |
| INC | Vinayakam | 23,902 | 37.40% | −17.74 |
| Tamilnad Socialist Labour Party | N. S. Naidu | 2,888 | 4.52% | New |
| Margin of victory | | 13,221 | 20.69% | 4.10% |
| Turnout | | 63,913 | 66.00% | 33.03% |
| Registered electors | | 99,751 | | |
| DMK gain from INC | | Swing | 2.94% | |

=== 1957 ===
1957 Madras Legislative Assembly election: Saidapet
| Party | Candidate | Votes | % | ±% |
|---|---|---|---|---|
| INC | A. S. Doraiswami Reddiar | 14,888 | 55.14% | +39.25 |
| Independent | N. P. Loganathan | 10,410 | 38.55% | New |
| Independent | A. Kamalathan | 1,703 | 6.31% | New |
| Margin of victory | | 4,478 | 16.58% | 14.25% |
| Turnout | | 27,001 | 32.97% | −52.05% |
| Registered electors | | 81,890 | | |
| INC hold | | Swing | 39.25% | |

=== 1952 ===
1952 Madras Legislative Assembly election: Saidapet
| Party | Candidate | Votes | % | ±% |
|---|---|---|---|---|
| INC | T. P. Elumalai | 19,703 | 15.89% | New |
| INC | N. Ramakrishna Iyer | 16,806 | 13.56% | New |
| RPI | R. Kannan | 11,689 | 9.43% | New |
| KMPP | M. S. Gnana Parakasam | 11,390 | 9.19% | New |
| KMPP | S. K. Govindaraja Naicker | 10,298 | 8.31% | New |
| Independent | V. Kanniappa Chetty | 9,987 | 8.06% | New |
| Socialist Party (India) | E. K. Desikan | 9,725 | 7.84% | New |
| Independent | Rathinam | 9,157 | 7.39% | New |
| RPI | S. M. Naganathanam | 8,955 | 7.22% | New |
| Socialist Party (India) | G. P. Madhavan | 7,657 | 6.18% | New |
| Independent | V. K. Palani | 3,512 | 2.83% | New |
| Margin of victory | | 2,897 | 2.34% | |
| Turnout | | 123,977 | 85.02% | |
| Registered electors | | 145,818 | | |
| INC win (new seat) | | | | |
