= Molony =

Molony may refer to:

- Alexander Molony, British actor
- Brian Molony, Canadian self-admitted compulsive former gambler from Toronto
- Brian Molony (footballer) (1932–1995), Australian rules footballer
- Damien Molony (born 1984), Irish actor now based in London
- David Matthew Molony, New Zealand cricketer active from 1985 to 1988
- David Molony (1950–2002), Irish Fine Gael politician
- Grace Molony, English actress
- Gweneth Molony (born 1932), Australian figure skater
- Helena Molony or Helena Moloney (1883–1967), Irish republican, feminist and labour activist
- Herbert Molony, DD, MA, missionary of the Anglican Church
- J. C. Molony (1877–1948), author, administrator and civil servant of the Indian civil service
- John Molony (born 1927), Australian historian, academic and author
- Martin Molony (born 1925), Irish retired jockey
- Mary Xavier Molony (1781–1865), Irish Presentation Sister, the first nun to establish Catholic schools in Newfoundland
- Patricia Molony (1926–2025), Australian figure skater
- Richard Molony (carriage maker) (1839–1938), manufacturer of carriages in 19th Century Los Angeles, California
- Richard S. Molony (1811–1891), U.S. Representative from Illinois
- Rowland Molony (born 1946), British poet and novelist
- Senan Molony, the current Political Editor for the Irish Daily Mail
- Steven Molony (born 1988), American actor, screenwriter, and film producer
- Thomas Molony, PC, QC (1865–1949), the last Lord Chief Justice of Ireland
- Trevor Molony (1897–1962), cricketer

== See also ==
- Chouteau v. Molony or Aboriginal title in the Taney Court United States v. Brooks
- Molony baronets, of the City of Dublin, is a title in the Baronetage of the United Kingdom
- Molochny
- Moloney (disambiguation)
