= C. Tadulinga Mudaliar =

Indian botanist

Rao Bahadur Chinnakavanam Tadulinga Mudaliar or C. Tadulingam (1878–1954) was an Indian botanist known for his book A Handbook of Some South Indian Grasses which he penned along with K. Rangachari. The book is considered to be the first on the subject and won Mudaliar considerable acclaim. Mudaliar served as mayor of Madras in 1942–43.

== Personal life ==
Born in Madras Presidency, in 1878, Mudaliar graduated from the Agricultural College, Coimbatore, in which he served as a principal in his later years.

Mudaliar wrote A Handbook on Some South Indian Grasses in 1921 along with K. Rangachari of the Government Museum, Chennai and won instant acclaim. He was elected Fellow of the Linnean Society and the "Rao Bahadur" title was conferred upon him.

== Politics ==
Mudaliar succeeded V. Chakkarai Chettiar as mayor of Madras city in 1942. He served till 1943 and was succeeded by Syed Niamatullah.

== Death ==
Mudaliar died in 1954 at the age of seventy-five.

== Notes ==
Preceded by V. Chakkarai Chettiar	Mayor of Madras; 1942-1943	Succeeded by Syed Niamatullah
