= Lakshmi Krishnamurti =

Indian author and politician

- Born: 24 July 1925; Madras, British India
- Died: 14 June 2009 (aged 83); Chennai, India
- Occupations: politician, author
- Spouse: K. Krishnamurthy

Lakshmi Krishnamurti (1 August 1925 – 14 June 2009) was an Indian author and politician. She is the daughter of Indian independence activist S. Satyamurti.

== Early life ==
Lakshmi Krishnamurti was born on 1 August 1925. in Madras, British India. Her father S. Satyamurti was one of the leading politicians of the Swaraj Party at that time. While in the General Hospital in Madras and in the penitentiary in Madras, Satyamurti wrote a series of letters to his daughter. These letters can be found in the book At the threshold of life

== Career ==
Lakshmi was a member of the Indian National Congress in her early days though she did not actively associate herself with the organisation. In 1964, K. Kamaraj nominated her to the Madras Legislative Council. As member of the council, Lakshmi championed educational reforms and was member of the committee which regularised private colleges.

Lakshmi played a more active political role during the Indian Emergency of 1975 and was jailed by Indira Gandhi. She co-founded the Janata Party and unsuccessfully contested from Mylapore in the 1977 Legislative Assembly election.

In her later years, Lakshmi wrote a biography of her father, The Satyamurti Letters which is considered to be the most authoritative book on the leader. She also founded the Satyamurti Centre for Democratic Studies on the occasion of Satyamurti's birth centenary in 1987.

== Death ==
Lakshmi died on 14 June 2009 after a brief illness. She was 83.
