= K. N. Srinivasan =

Indian politician

K. N. Srinivasan was an Indian politician who served as mayor of Madras city from November 1956 to December 1957. He was a member of the Indian National Congress.

== Early life ==
Born in Chingleput district on 20 September 1914, Srinivasan studied at the Madras Christian College and Madras Law College. Srinivasan enrolled as an advocate of the Madras High Court in 1945.

== Political career ==
From his early years, Srinivasan was a member of the Indian National Congress. He served as a member of the Tamil Nadu Congress Committee for ten years. He was also a member of the Chingleput District Conference. On 29 November 1956, he was nominated mayor of Madras and served till December 1957, when he was succeeded by Tara Cherian.
