= P. T. Kumarasamy Chetty =

Indian businessman

Diwan Bahadur P. T. Kumaraswamy Chetty was an Indian businessman and politician of the Justice Party who served as President of the Madras Corporation from 1930 to 1931. He also served as President of Pachaiyappa Charities from 1930 to 1931 and President of the Andhra Chamber of Commerce from 1931 to 1934. Kumaraswamy Chetty was a nephew of Justice Party founder, P. Theagaraya Chetty.
