= G. Senthamizhan =

Indian politician

G. Senthamizhan is an Indian politician and was a member of the 14th Tamil Nadu Legislative Assembly from Saidapet constituency. He represented the All India Anna Dravida Munnetra Kazhagam party.

Senthamizhan was sacked as Minister for Information, Law and Courts in November 2011 as part of the third cabinet reshuffle in a five-month period by Chief Minister Jayalalithaa. It was alleged that he had attempted to influence the police to release some AIADMK party members.

The elections of 2016 resulted in his constituency being won by Ma. Subramanian. Senthamizhan was one of thirteen AIADMK MLAs in the Greater Chennai area who were deselected by the party, apparently in an attempt to thwart a potential anti-incumbency backlash from the electorate following the recent flooding. It was felt that fresh faces would put some distance between the past and the present.

He is a law graduate and completed his M.L. degree in the Tamil Nadu Dr. Ambedkar Law University. Presently, he pursues his Ph.D. degree in the topic of Constitutional Amendments in India from 1950 till date.
