= G. Janakiram Chetty =

Gopathi Janakiram Chetty (born 13 May 1906) was an Indian merchant and politician who served as the mayor of Madras from May to November 1941.

== Early life and education ==
Janakiram Chetty was born on 13 May 1906 to Indian merchant and bureaucrat, G. N. Chetty. He studied in Madras and graduated from Pachaiyappa's College.

== Public career ==
Janakiram Chetty was elected to the Corporation of Madras in 1934 and served as Mayor from May to November 1941. Like his father, Janakiram Chetty also served as trustee of Pachaiyappa Charities from 1934 to 1949.

== Notes ==
Preceded by C. Basudev	Mayor of Madras; May 1941 – November 1941	Succeeded by V. Chakkarai Chettiar
