= C. Basudev =

Indian politician

C. Basudev was an Indian labour unionist who served as member of the Madras Legislative Council from 1930 to 1937 and mayor of Madras.

== Madras Legislative Council ==
Basudev was nominated to the Madras Legislative Council in 1930 by the Justice Party with whom he had friendly links. In the council, Basudev moved the Madras Moneylenders' Bill on 31 October 1932 in order to remove the indebtedness of farmers. This bill, with considerable changes, became the Debtors Protection Bill and was passed by the council. Basudev's speeches in the council were translated into Tamil by C. N. Annadurai for the benefit of people who did not know English. After serving two terms, Basudev was defeated in the 1937 elections by mill supervisor N. G. Ramaswamy Naidu of the Indian National Congress.

== Mayoralty ==
Basudev was elected mayor of Madras in May 1940 and served until May 1941.

Preceded by S. Satyamurti	Mayor of Madras; 1940–1941	Succeeded by G. Janakiram Chetty
