= T. Sundara Rao Naidu =

Thamarapakkam Sundara Rao Naidu (1891–1949) was an Indian lawyer and politician who served as mayor of Madras city in 1946-47. He was the first mayor of the city after India's independence.

== Early life ==
Sundara Rao Naidu was born in January 1889 to Diwan Bahadur T. Varadarajulu Naidu (1863-1930) a Padma Velamma Naidu family. He had his education in Madras and graduated in law from the Madras Law College. He practised for a short while before entering politics.

== Career ==
Sundara Rao Naidu joined the Justice Party in the 1920s and served as a member of the Madras Legislative Council. In the 1930s, he was secretary to the chief minister of Madras Presidency.

Sundara Rao Naidu was nominated mayor of Madras city in 1946 and served till 1947. It was during his period that India became independent.

== Death ==
Sundara Rao Naidu died unexpectedly in 1949. T. Sundara Rao Naidu Street in Thousand Lights, Chennai, is named after him. Sundar Rao Park is a Corporation of Chennai maintained park named after him on Marshalls Road Egmore. His statue is erected at the junction of Langs Garden Road and Pantheon Road in Egmore.

Preceded by N. Sivaraj	Mayor of Madras; 1946-1947	Succeeded by U. Krishna Rao
