= K. Venkataswami Naidu =

7th Mayor of Madras
- In office 1938 – 1939
- Succeeded by: J. Shivashanmugam Pillai

Member of the Madras State Assembly
- In office 1952–1957
- Preceded by: Sivashanmugham Pillai
- Constituency: Thousand Lights

Minister for Religious endowments and Registration
- In office 1952 - 1954

Personal details
- Party: Indian National Congress

K. Venkataswami Naidu (6 July 1896 – 8 March 1972) was an Indian lawyer and politician from Tamil Nadu, belonging to Indian National Congress. He served as the Mayor of Madras in the late 1930s. During 1952-54, he was the Minister for Religious Endowments and Registration of Madras State (in C. Rajagopalachari's cabinet).

== Early life ==
Venkataswami Naidu was born on 6 July 1896 to Bashyam Naidu, the founder of Appa & Co. Pharmaceuticals. He was a direct descendant of Beri Thimmappa, a prominent merchant and dubash from the late 17th and early 18th centuries. He was educated at the Pachaiyappa's College and studied law at Madras Law College. His family was part of a powerful Naidu lineage and was one of the wealthiest families in Madras.

In 1916, Venkataswami Naidu married Varalakshmi Bhimamma.

Preceded by J. Shivashanmugam Pillai	Mayor of Madras; 1938–1939	Succeeded by S. Satyamurti
