= Syed Niamatullah =

Indian politician and Unani practitioner

Hakim Syed Niamatullah (1900–1961) was an Indian politician and practitioner of Unani medicine who served as mayor of Madras city in 1943–44.

Preceded by C. Tadulinga Mudaliar	Mayor of Madras; 1943–1944	Succeeded by M. Radhakrishna Pillai
