= N. Sivaraj =

Indian lawyer, politician and Scheduled Caste activist

Member of Parliament, Lok Sabha
- In office 1957–1961
- Preceded by: O. V. Alagesan
- Succeeded by: A. Krishnaswamy
- Constituency: Chengalpattu

Personal details
- Born: 29 September 1892 Kadapa, Madras Presidency, British India (now Andhra Pradesh, India)
- Died: 29 September 1964 (aged 72) Chennai, Tamil Nadu, India
- Party: Madras Scheduled Castes Party, Madras Scheduled Castes Federation, All-India Scheduled Castes Federation, Republican Party of India
- Other political affiliations: Justice Party (India)
- Spouse: Annai Meenambal Shivaraj
- Education: Dr. Ambedkar Government Law College, Chennai
- Occupation: Politician, Activist

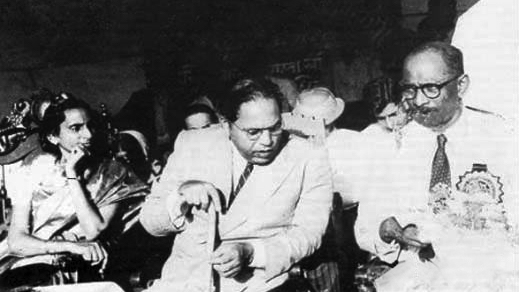
Annai Meenambal (L), Dr. Babasaheb Ambedkar (C) and Rao Bahadur N. Sivaraj (R) during "The All-India SCF women's conference" held at Bombay, on 6 May 1945

Rao Bahadur Namasivayam Sivaraj (29 September 1892 – 29 September 1964) was an Indian lawyer, social reformer and political leader and Scheduled Castes activist from the state of Tamil Nadu. He is also referred to by the honorific title "Thanthai", which means "Father" in Tamil.

== Early life and education ==
Sivaraj was born into a Tamil Buddhist family to Namsivayam, an accounts officer, on 29 September 1892 in the town of Cuddapah in the then Madras Presidency. His ancestors were from the town of Poonamallee near Madras. N. Sivaraj passed his matriculation in 1907 and did B.A. from Presidency College, Madras in 1911. In 1915 he graduated as a lawyer from the Madras Law College and practised as a junior under Sir C. P. Ramaswamy Iyer. He worked as a lecturer in the Madras Law College for a period of thirteen years.

== Family ==
Sivaraj was married to Annai Meenambal and had four children.

== Politics ==
Sivaraj was one of the founding members of the Justice Party in 1917 and supported it until 1926. In 1927, along with Rettamalai Srinivasan, he founded the Madras Provincial Depressed Classes Federation. In 1936, the Madras Provincial Depressed Classes Federation was transformed into the Madras Scheduled Castes Party. Again, it was renamed as the Madras Scheduled Castes Federation (SCF) in 1938. He was nominated to the Madras Legislative Council in 1926 and served as a member until 1937. From 1937 to 1947, Sivaraj served as a member of the Imperial Central Legislative Assembly. He was elected as the mayor of the Madras Municipal Corporation in 1945 and served until 1946. He contested the 1952, 1957 and 1962 Lok Sabha elections, and was elected to the Parliament of India from the Chengalpattu constituency in 1957.

He was an active member of Anti-Brahminism movement and Women's Rights movement in Tamil Nadu along with Periyar E.V. Ramaswamy.

In 1942, Madras SCF and Bombay and Central Provinces-based ILP were transformed into the All-India Scheduled Castes Federation. The All-India SCF was an organisation in India founded by N. Sivaraj and B. R. Ambedkar in a national convention held at Nagpur during 17–20 July 1942. It was presided by Sivaraj, and he was elected as its first President. The germs of the AISCF were to be found in the Madras Provincial Depressed Classes Federation.

When the Republican Party of India was founded in 1957, he was again elected as its first president and continued working to establish the organisation until he died in 1964.

== Notes ==
| Preceded by M. Radhakrishna Pillai | Mayor of Madras; 1945–1946 | Succeeded by T. Sundara Rao Naidu |
