= P. V. Cherian =

Indian physician and politician

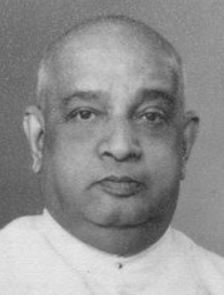

7th Governor of Bombay (Maharashtra from 1960)
- In office 14 November 1964 – 8 November 1969
- Chief Minister: Vasantrao Naik
- Preceded by: Vijaya Lakshmi Pandit
- Succeeded by: Ali Yavar Jung

Chairman of Madras Legislative Council
- In office 1952 – 20 April 1964
- Chief Minister: C. Rajagopalachari; K. Kamaraj
- Preceded by: R. B. Ramakrishna Raju
- Succeeded by: M. A. Manickavelu Naicker

Mayor of Madras
- In office 1949–1950
- Preceded by: S. Ramaswamy Naidu
- Succeeded by: R. Ramanathan Chettiar

Personal details
- Born: 9 July 1893 Alleppey, Travancore, British India
- Died: 9 November 1969 (aged 76) Bombay, Maharashtra, India

Palathinkal Varkey Cherian (or Cheriyan) (9 July 1893 – 9 November 1969) was a physician, surgeon and politician from India. He was the Governor of Maharashtra from 14 November 1964 to 8 November 1969.

== Early life and medical career ==
Cherian was born in Alleppey, Travancore, as the son of Achamma and Magistrate P. M. Varkey and to the Anglican Syrian Christian Palathinkal family. After completing schooling in Travancore, Cherian went to Madras in 1912, where he earned his MBBS degree in 1917. He then joined the Government Hospital for Women and Children as an Assistant Surgeon. He was later commissioned to the Indian Medical Service, as part of the 88th Carnatic Infantry and served in various cities in Mesopotamia.

In 1925, Cherian went to the United Kingdom to specialise in ear, nose and throat diseases and, in 1926, passed the FRCS examination from Edinburgh. R. N. Arogyasamy Mudaliar, the Minister for Medical Administration (1926–28), he was keen to "indianise" medical services. So he appointed Cherian the first Indian Superintendent of Madras Medical College. Later, Cherian became Principal of the college and was appointed the first Indian Surgeon General of Madras Presidency.

== Political career ==
After his retirement from the government medical service in 1948, Cherian became increasingly active in politics. He was an alderman of the Corporation of Madras in 1948 and, in 1950, became mayor of the city. His wife, Tara, whom he married in 1935, was elected to this office in 1956, making the Cherians the only couple to have held the office of the Mayor of Madras.

Tara Cherian, who died in November 2000, was the first woman mayor of independent India and was herself a Member of the Legislative Council during M. G. Ramachandran's government. In 1952, Cherian was elected to the Madras Legislative Council and became its Chairman. He was re-elected to both the Council and its chairmanship in 1959.

On 14 November 1964, P. V. Cherian was sworn in as the Governor of Maharashtra. He was a well known figure in that position. As a Christian, he promoted ecumenism. He was the president of the All India Conference of Indian Christians. At the same time, he was a high ranking rotarian and freemason.

In recognition of their services to the Indian Christian community, Dr. Cherian and his wife Tara were vested with the Pontifical Equestrian Order of St. Gregory the Great and the Benemerenti medal respectively, by Pope Paul VI. They are the first non-Catholic Indians to receive such Papal Orders. Tara Cherian was also awarded Padma Bhushan, the third highest civilian honour in India, for her social work. Governor Cherian died in office, on 9 November 1969, at the age of 76.

== Bibliography ==
- "Previous Governors: Raj Bhavan, Maharashtra, India". Rajbhavan Maharashtra. Government of Maharashtra. 2021.
- Sarkar, Subodh Chandra (1967). Hindustan Year-book and Who's who. Vol. 35. M. C. Sarkar.
- Nehru, Jawaharlal (1984). Selected Works of Jawaharlal Nehru: Second series. Jawaharlal Nehru Memorial Fund. ISBN 978-0-19-565275-8.
- Mooken, Mar Aprem (1983). Indian Christian who is who. Bombay Parish Church of the East.
- LBR, Team (5 May 2018). Limca Book of Records: India at Her Best. Hachette India. ISBN 978-93-5195-240-4.
- Bhatt, S. C.; Bhargava, Gopal K. (2006). Land and People of Indian States and Union Territories: In 36 Volumes. Maharashtra. Vol. 16. Gyan Publishing House. ISBN 978-81-7835-372-2.
- Legislature, Tamil Nadu (India) (1971). Debates, Official Report (in Tamil). Vol. 82. Tamil Nadu Legislative Council.

| Preceded by S. Ramaswamy Naidu | Mayor of Madras; 1949–1950 | Succeeded by R. Ramanathan Chettiar |
| Preceded by R. B. Ramakrishna Raju | Chairman of Madras Legislative Council; 1952–1964 | Succeeded by M. A. Manickavelu Naicker |
| Preceded by Vijaya Lakshmi Pandit | Governor of Maharashtra; 1964–1969 | Succeeded by Ali Yavar Jung |
