= G. Kuchelar =

Indian politician

G. Kuchelar was an Indian politician of the Dravida Munnetra Kazhagam (DMK) who served as mayor of Madras from 1961 to 1963. He belonged to the Dalit community.
