= S. Krishnamurthy =

Indian politician

S. Krishnamurthy was an Indian politician who served as mayor of Madras from 1964 to 1965. Hailing from a Brahmin family, Krishnamurthy stood as an independent candidate against K. M. Subramaniam of the Indian National Congress and was elected to power with the support of the Dravida Munnetra Kazhagam (DMK).
