= Priya Rajan =

49th Mayor of Chennai

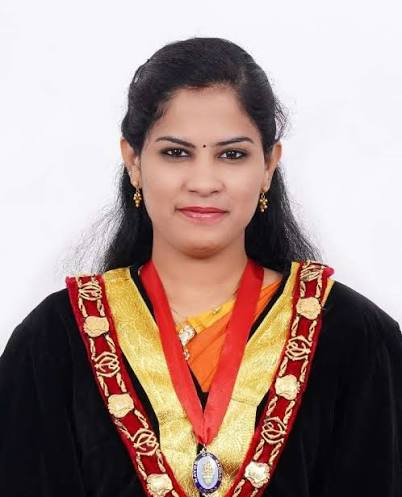

49th Mayor of Chennai
- Incumbent
- Assumed office 4 March 2022
- Deputy: Mahesh Kumar
- Preceded by: Saidai Sa. Duraisamy

Personal details
- Born: 20 November 1993 (age 32) Madras (now Chennai), Tamil Nadu, India
- Party: Dravida Munnetra Kazhagam

Priya Rajan (born 20 November 1993) is the 49th and incumbent mayor of Chennai, Tamil Nadu, India. She is a member of the Dravida Munnetra Kazhagam (DMK) and was elected on 4 March 2022 after the 2022 Tamil Nadu local elections. She is the youngest and the third woman to serve as mayor of the city.

== Early and personal life ==
Priya graduated from Sri Kanyaka Parameswari Arts and Science College for Women with a post-graduate degree in Commerce. She is the granddaughter of Chengai Sivam, former two time MLA of Perambur.

== Political career ==
Priya Rajan was elected as a councilor from 74th ward in Thiru. Vi. Ka Nagar in Chennai Corporation representing Dravida Munnetra Kazhagam (DMK) in the 2022 Tamil Nadu local elections. On 4 March 2022, she was elected as the 49th mayor of Chennai in 2022. She is the youngest and the third woman to become the mayor of the city.
