= Vasanthi Devi =

Indian academic (1938–2025)

V. Vasanthi Devi (8 November 1938 – 1 August 2025) was an Indian educationist and academic. She was the president of the Association for India's Development and a trustee of the Madras Institute of Development Studies. Devi served as the second vice-chancellor of Manonmaniam Sundaranar University between 1992–1998 and as the chairperson of the State Commission for Women in Tamil Nadu between 2002 and 2005.

== Life and career ==
Vasanthi Devi was born in 1938 in Dindigul, Madras Province, to P. V. Das who was a municipal chairman. Her maternal grandfather was Vengal Chakkarai, an Indian independence activist, trade unionist, and Christian theologian. Through Chakkarai, Devi was also related to P. Chenchiah.

At the age of 15, Devi moved to the city of Madras and enrolled in the Queen Mary's College, Chennai to complete her higher secondary education. She graduated from Presidency College, Chennai with a Master of Arts in history. Subsequently, she went to the Philippines in the 1970s for a PhD in domestic political groupings and dynamics and graduated with the doctorate at the University of the Philippines in 1980.

She became a professor at the Queen Mary's College and is noted to have led the 1987 college teacher's strike in Tamil Nadu. She was appointed the principal of the Government College for Women, Kumbakonam between 1988 and 1990. Between 1992 and 1998, she was appointed the vice-chancellor of the Manonmaniam Sundaranar University and later made the chairperson of the State Commission for Women in Tamil Nadu between 2002 and 2005.

Devi died from a cardiac arrest at her home in Velachery, on 1 August 2025, at the age of 86.
