= Annai Meenambal Shivaraj =

Indian politician

Annai Meenambal Sivaraj
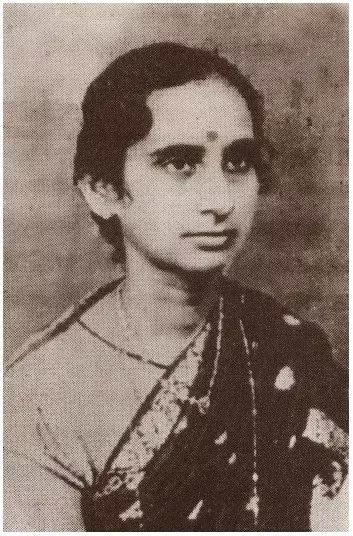
- Born: 26 December 1904; Rangoon, Burma (now Yangon, Myanmar)
- Died: 30 November 1992 (aged 87); Chennai, Tamil Nadu, India
- Occupation: Political activist
- Political party: Scheduled Castes Federation
- Movement: Ambedkarite movement
- Spouse: N. Sivaraj (1892–1964)
- Father: P. M. Madurai Pillai (1858–1913)

Annai Meenambal Sivaraj (Tamil: அன்னை மீனாம்பாள் சிவராஜ்; 26 December 1904 – 30 November 1992) was the first woman President of the South India Scheduled Castes Federation (SCF). She presided over the SCF Women's Conference held at Madras, in 1944, which was attended by B. R. Ambedkar. She also presided over the All India SCF Women's Conference held at Bombay, on 6 May 1945.

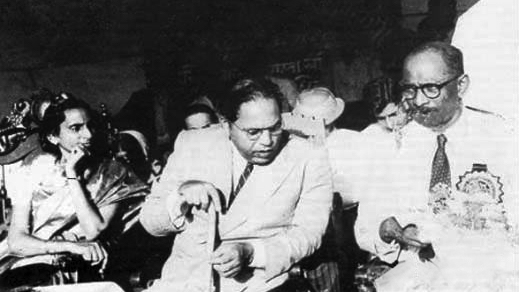
Annai Meenambal (L), Dr. Babasaheb Ambedkar (C) and Rao Bahadur N. Sivaraj (R) during "The All India SCF women's conference" held at Bombay, on May 6th, 1945

In 1937, Meenambal Sivaraj presided over the Tinnelveli District Third Adi Dravida Conference.
