= M. Radhakrishna Pillai =

Indian politician

M. Radhakrishna Pillai (1911–1974) was an Indian politician and philanthropist who served as mayor of Madras city. The Mayor Radhakrishnan Stadium in Chennai is named after him.

== Early life ==
Radhakrishna Pillai was born in 1911 to Venkatarathnam Pillai and Alarmel Mangai Thayar. His mother belonged to the affluent Thottakadu family. Venkataratnam Pillai died when Radhakrishna Pillai was young. Pillai's grandfather died in 1930.

Radhakrishna Pillai had his schooling at the Hindu Theological High School and Pachaiyappa's High School. He graduated from the Pachaiyappa's College in 1930 and studied law at the Madras Law College. Following his graduation, Pillai worked as a junior under the lawyer, V. C. Gopalratnam. He married Perundevi Thayarammal in 1936.

== As Mayor ==
Radhakrishna Pillai served as mayor of Madras city in 1944–45. As mayor, he brought about a number of reforms.

== Later life ==
Radhakrishna Pillai stayed away from politics from 1962 to 1967 and re-emerged in 1969 as a supporter of Indira Gandhi against K. Kamaraj. He died in 1974 at the age of 63.

Preceded by Syed Niamatullah	Mayor of Madras; 1944–1945	Succeeded by N. Sivaraj
