= S. Ramaswamy Naidu =

Indian politician

S. Ramaswamy Naidu (c. 1901 – 9 January 1969) was an Indian politician and former Member of the Legislative Assembly. He was elected to the Tamil Nadu legislative assembly as an Indian National Congress candidate from Sattur constituency in 1952 election, from Sivakasi constituency in 1957 and 1962 elections as Indian National Congress candidate. He was again elected from Sattur constituency as a Swatantra Party candidate in 1967 election.

He was one among the four MLAs nominated to be a member of panel of Chairmen for the first session of the 1st Legislative Assembly newly constituted under the constitution of India. He was nominated by the speaker of assembly J. Sivashanmugam Pillai.

Preceded by U. Krishna Rao	Mayor of Madras; 1948-1949	Succeeded by P. V. Cherian
