= Sundar Singh =

Christian saint from India

Saint Sundar Singh
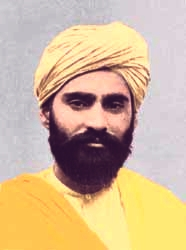
- Sadhu Sundar Singh

Sadhu, Teacher of His Believers
- Born: Sundar Singh; 3 September 1889; Ludhiana, Punjab, British India (present-day Punjab, India)
- Died: c. 1929 (aged around 39–40); Himalayas
- Venerated in: Anglican Communion Several Churches in India
- Major shrine: Churches in India
- Feast: 19 June (Anglican Communion)
- Patronage: Teacher of the Faith
- Tradition or genre: High Anglicanism
- Major works: Preaching of Jesus Christ, claimed miracle works

Sadhu Sundar Singh (3 September 1889 – 1929, believed) was an Indian Christian missionary.

== Life ==
=== Early years ===
Sundar Singh was birthed into a Sikh family in the village of Rampur (near Doraha), Ludhiana district (Punjab), in Northern India. Singh's mother took him to sit at the feet of a Hindu sadhu, an ascetic holy man, who lived in the jungle some miles away, while also sending him to Ewing Christian High School, Ludhiana, to learn English. Singh's mother died when he was fourteen. In anger, he burned a Bible page by page while his friends watched. He was also taught the Bhagavad Gita at his home.

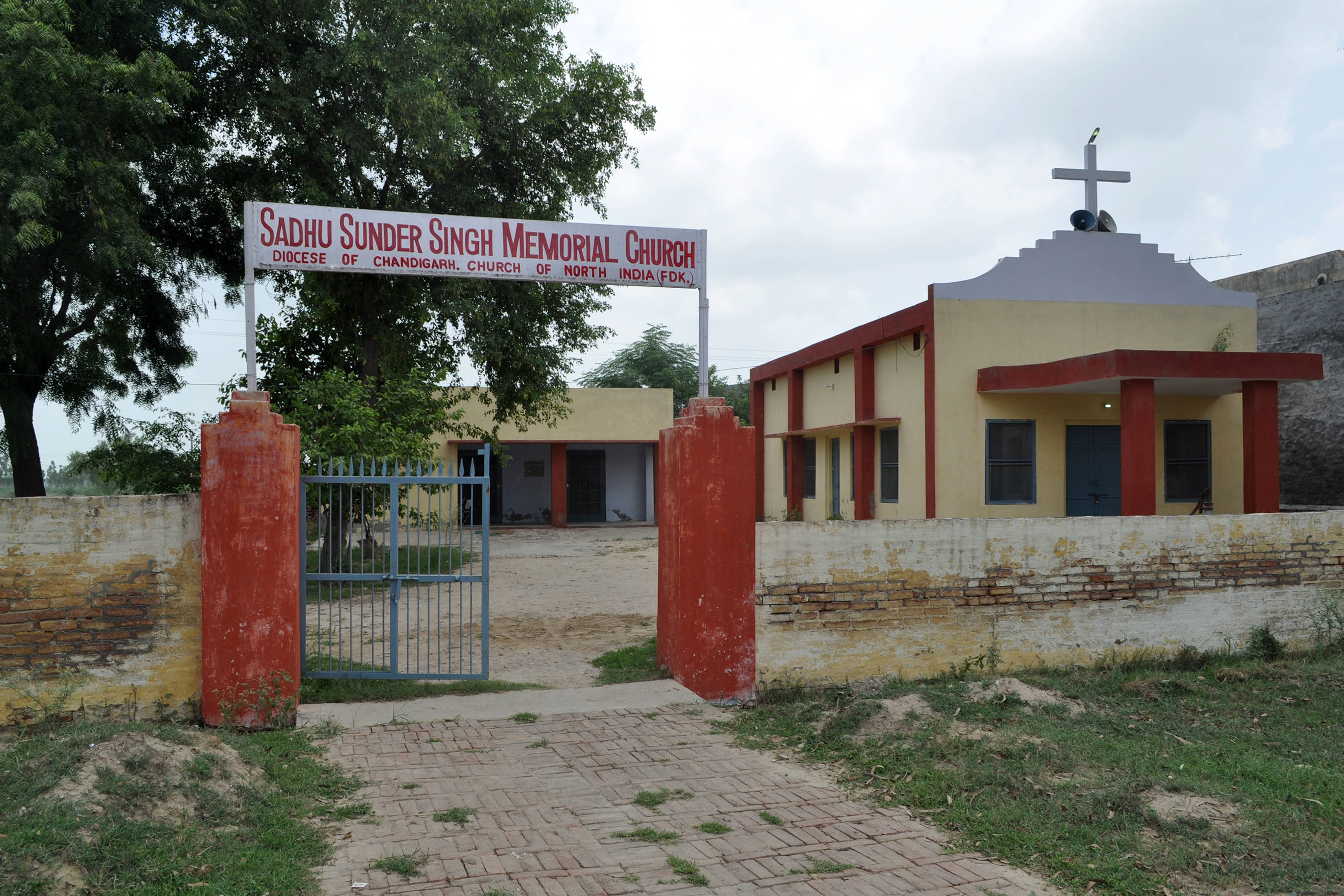
Sadhu Sundar Singh Memorial Church in Faridkot, India

Sadhu Sundar Singh CNI Church Rupnagar, India

=== Conversion to Anglican Christianity ===
Singh believed that his religious pursuits and the questioning of Christian priests left him without ultimate meaning. He resolved to kill himself by throwing himself on a railroad track. He asked that whoever is the "true God" would appear before him or else he would kill himself; that very night he had a vision of Jesus. He announced to his father, Sher Singh, that he would be converted into the missionary work of Jesus Christ. His father officially rejected him, and his brother Rajender Singh attempted to poison him. He was poisoned not just once but a number of times. People of that area threw snakes into his house, but he was rescued from mistreatment with the help of a nearby British Christian.

On his sixteenth birthday, he was publicly baptised as a Christian at the parish church in Simla, in the Himalayan foothills. Prior to this, he had been staying at the Christian Missionary Home at Sabathu, near Simla, serving the leprosy patients there.

=== Life of conversions ===
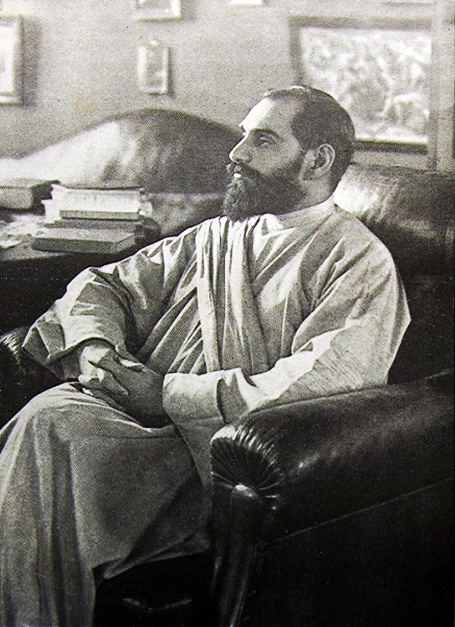

In October 1906, he set out on his journey as a new Christian, wearing a saffron turban and the saffron robe of a sadhu, an ascetic devoted to spiritual practice. Singh propagated himself as a sadhu, albeit one within Christianity, because he realised Indians could not be converted unless it was in an Indian way.

"I am not worthy to follow in the steps of my Lord", he said, "but, like Him, I want no home, no possessions. Like Him I will belong to the road, sharing the suffering of my people, eating with those who will give me shelter, and telling all men of the love of God."

After returning to his home village, where he was given an unexpectedly warm welcome, Sundar Singh traveled northward for his mission of converting through the Punjab, over the Bannihal Pass into Kashmir, and then back through Muslim Afghanistan and into the brigand-infested North-West Frontier and Baluchistan. He was referred to as "the apostle with the bleeding feet" by the Christian communities of the north. He suffered arrest and stoning for his beliefs, and experienced mystical encounters.

In 1908, he crossed the frontier of Tibet, where he was appalled by the living conditions. He was stoned as he bathed in cold water because it was believed that "holy men never washed."

In 1908 he went to Bombay, hoping to board a ship to visit Palestine, but was refused a permit, and had to return to the north.

He concluded during his stay in missions that Western civilisation had become the antithesis of original Christian values. He was disillusioned with the materialism and colonialism of Western society and tried to forge an Indian identity for the Indian church. He lamented that Indian Christians adopted British customs, literature and dress that had nothing to do with Christianity and Christ.

=== Formal Christian training ===
In December 1909, Singh began training for Christian ministry at the Anglican college in Lahore. According to his biographers, he did not form close relationships with fellow students, meeting them only at meal times and designated prayer sessions. He was ostracised for being "different".

Although Singh had been baptised by an Anglican priest, he was ignorant of the ecclesiastical culture and conventions of Anglicanism. His inability to adapt hindered him from fitting in with the routines of academic study. Much in the college course seemed irrelevant to the gospel as India needed to hear it. After eight months in the college, Singh left in July 1910.

It has been claimed by his biographers that Singh's withdrawal was due to stipulations laid down by Bishop Lefroy. As an Anglican priest, Singh was told to discard his sadhu's robe and wear "respectable" European clerical dress, use formal Anglican worship, sing English hymns and not preach outside his parish without permission. As an ardent devotee of Christ who was interested only in spreading his message, he rejected the mixing of Jesus Christ and British culture.

=== Converting others ===
Stories from those years are astonishing and sometimes incredible and full of miracles which helped in conversion. Indeed, there were those who insisted that they were mystical rather than real happenings. That first year, 1912, he returned with an extraordinary account of finding a three-hundred-year-old hermit in a mountain cave—the Maharishi of Kailas, with whom he spent some weeks in deep fellowship.

According to Singh, in a town called Rasar he had been thrown into a dry well full of bones and rotting flesh and left to die, but three days later he was rescued.

The secret missionaries group is alleged to have numbered around 24,000 members across India. The origins of this brotherhood were reputed to be linked to one of the Magi at Christ's nativity and then the second-century AD disciples of the Apostle Thomas circulating in India. Nothing was heard of this evangelistic fellowship until William Carey began his missionary work in Serampore. The Maharishi of Kailas experienced ecstatic visions about the secret fellowship that he retold to Sundar Singh, and Singh himself built his spiritual life around visions.

Whether he won many continuing disciples on these hazardous Tibetan treks is not known. One reason why no one believed his version of this story was because Singh did not keep written records and he was unaccompanied by any other Christian disciples who might have witnessed the events.

=== Travels abroad ===
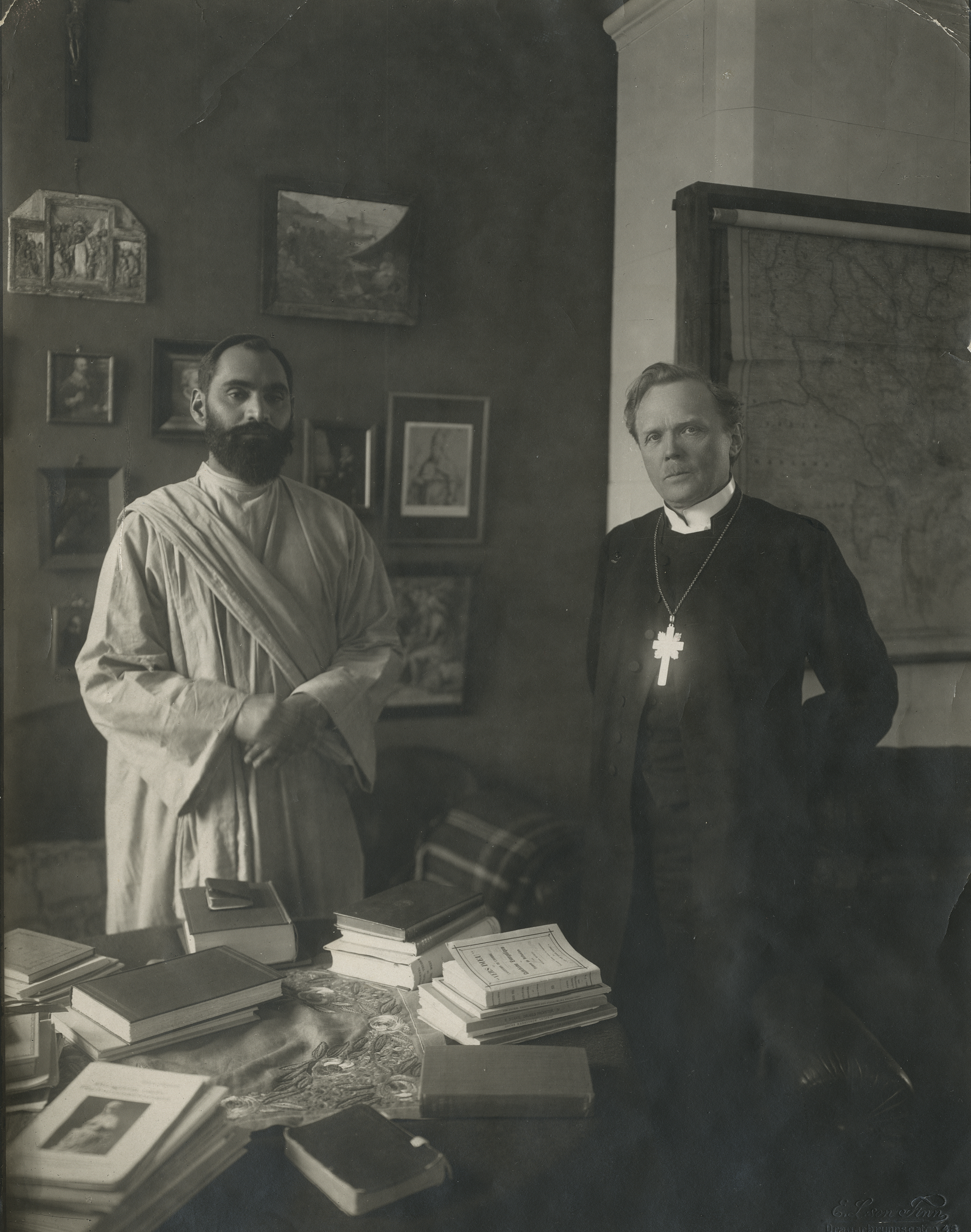
Sadhu Sundar Singh with Nathan Söderblom during a visit to Sweden in 1922.

During his twenties, Sundar Singh's gospel work widened greatly, and long before he was thirty, his name and picture were familiar all over the Christian world. He described a struggle with Satan to retain his humility, but people described him as always human, approachable and humble, with a sense of fun and a love of nature. This character, with his illustrations from ordinary life, gave his addresses great impact. Many people said, "He not only looks like Jesus, he talks like Jesus must have talked." His talks and his personal speech were informed by his habitual early-morning meditation, especially on the gospels. In 1918 he made a long tour of South India and Ceylon, and the following year he was invited to Burma, Malaya, China and Japan.

Some of the stories from these tours were as strange as any of his Tibetan adventures. He claimed power over wild things. He claimed even to have power over disease and illness, though he never allowed his presumed healing gifts to be publicised.

For a long time Sundar Singh had wanted to visit Britain, and the opportunity came when his father, Sher Singh, who was converted too, gave him the money for his fare to Britain. He visited the West twice, travelling to Britain, the United States and Australia in 1920, and to Europe again in 1922. He was welcomed by Christians of many traditions, and his words searched the hearts of people who now faced the aftermath of World War I and who seemed to evidence a shallow attitude to life. Singh was appalled by what he saw as the materialism, emptiness and irreligion he found throughout the West, contrasting it with Asia's awareness of God, no matter how limited that might be. Once back in India he continued his gospel-proclamation work, though it was clear that he was getting more physically frail.

=== Final trip ===
In 1923, Singh made the last of his regular summer visits to Tibet and came back exhausted. His preaching days were apparently over and, in the following years, in his own home or those of his friends in the Simla hills, he gave himself to meditation, fellowship and writing some of the things he had lived to preach.

In 1929, against all his friends' advice, Singh wished to make one last journey to Tibet. He was last seen on 18 April 1929 setting off on this journey. In April he reached Kalka, a small town below Simla, a prematurely aged figure in his yellow robe among pilgrims and holy men who were beginning their own trek to one of Hinduism's holy places some miles away. Where he went after that is unknown. Whether he died of exhaustion or reached the mountains remains a mystery.

In the early 1940s, Bishop Augustine Peters, another converted missionary from South India, sought out Singh's brother Rajender, led him to the Christian faith and baptised him in Punjab. Rajender Singh referred to many reputed miracles performed by Singh and people converted to Christ under his ministry.

Singh is revered by many as a formative, towering figure in the missionary conversions of the Christians in India.

=== Postmortem prophecies ===
Apocalyptic prophecies attributed to Singh about the fate of Romania are famous in that country, but are apocryphal, being written by a medium who said he was channeling Singh's spirit.

=== Recognition by other Christians ===
Singh is respected in the Malankara Orthodox Syrian Church and the Coptic Church, although neither officially recognises him as a saint. He was invited to address the Mateer Memorial Congregation (now the Mateer Memorial CSI Church) when he arrived in Travancore on 12 February 1918.

Sadhu is remembered in the Church of England with a commemoration on 19 June.

In 2022, Singh's story was dramatised as a two-part broadcast through Pacific Garden Mission's Unshackled! radio ministry, airing as programs 3725 and 3726.

=== Tendency toward Universalist beliefs ===
In 1925 Sundar wrote, "If the Divine spark in the soul cannot be destroyed, then we need despair of no sinner... Since God created men to have fellowship with Himself, they cannot for ever be separated from Him... After long wandering, and by devious paths, sinful man will at last return to Him in whose Image he was created; for this is his final destiny." In February 1929, in response to questions from theology students in Calcutta, India, he elaborated: "There was punishment, but it was not eternal... Everyone after this life would be given a fair chance of making good, and attaining to the measure of fullness the soul was capable of. This might sometimes take ages."

== In popular culture ==
Ken Anderson made Journey to the Sky, a 1967 Christian drama film which starred Indian actor Manhar Desai (Malcolm Alfredo Desai) in the lead role of Sadhu Sundar Singh.

Aldous Huxley mentions Singh in his book The Perennial Philosophy, quoting him: "The children of god are very dear but very queer, very nice but very narrow."

In C. S. Lewis' science fiction novel That Hideous Strength, there is a mention of an Indian Christian mystic who is known as the "Sura," who, like Singh, mysteriously disappears.

== Timeline ==
- 1889 – Born at Rampur Kataania, Ludhiana, Punjab
- 1903 – Conversion
- 1904 – Cast out from home
- 1905 – Baptised in Simla; begins life as a sadhu
- 1907 – Works in leprosy hospital at Sabathu
- 1908 – First visit to Tibet
- 1909 – Enters Divinity College, Lahore, to train for the ministry
- 1911 – Hands back his preacher's license; returns to the sadhu's life
- 1912 – Tours through Northern India and the Buddhist states of the Himalayas
- 1918 to 1922 – Travels worldwide
- 1923 – Turned back from Tibet
- 1925 to 1927 – Quietly spends time writing
- 1927 – Sets out for Tibet but returns due to illness
- 1929 – Final attempt to reach Tibet
- 1972 – Sadhu Sundar Singh Evangelical Association formed

== Writings ==
Sundar Singh wrote eight books between 1922 and 1929. His manuscripts were written in Urdu and later translated into English and other languages.

- At the Master's Feet (London: Fleming H. Revell, 1922)
- Reality and Religion: Meditations on God, Man and Nature (London: Macmillan, 1924)
- The Search After Reality: Thoughts on Hinduism, Buddhism, Muhammadanism and Christianity (London: Macmillan, 1925)
- Meditations on Various Aspects of the Spiritual Life (London: Macmillan, 1926)
- Visions of the Spiritual World (London: Macmillan, 1926)
- With and Without Christ (London: Cassell; New York: Harper & Brothers, 1929)
- The Real Life (published posthumously; Madras: CLS, 1965)
- The Real Pearl (published posthumously; Madras: CLS, 1966)

A number of his works were compiled and edited by others:

- The Cross Is Heaven: The Life and Writings of Sadhu Sundar Singh, edited by A. J. Appasamy (London: Lutterworth Press, 1956). – A collection of short articles by Sundar Singh.
- Life in Abundance, edited by A. F. Thyagaraju (Madras: CLS, 1980). – This is a collection of transcripts of his sermons, preached in Switzerland in March 1922, as recorded by Alys Goodwin.
- The Christian Witness of Sadhu Sundar Singh: A Collection of His Writings, edited by T. Dayanandan Francis (Madras, India: The Christian Literature Society, 1989).
