= Arul Prakasam M. =

Indian politician

Arul Prakasam M. is an Indian politician and member of Tamilaga Vettri Kazhagam (TVK). He is the elected Member of the Legislative Assembly (MLA) for the Saidapet Assembly constituency in Chennai district, Tamil Nadu, having won the seat in the 2026 Tamil Nadu Legislative Assembly election.

== Early life and education ==
Arul Prakasam completed his SSLC education from St. Joseph Higher Secondary School, Tirupapuliyur, in 1996.

He is the managing director of Tejas Builders and the Managing Trustee of Sri Arangar Arutkudil.

== Political career ==
Arul Prakasam is a member of Tamilaga Vettri Kazhagam (TVK), a political party founded by actor-politician Vijay.

=== 2026 election ===
In the 2026 Tamil Nadu Legislative Assembly election, held on 23 April 2026, Arul Prakasam contested from the Saidapet Assembly constituency in Chennai district as the candidate of Tamilaga Vettri Kazhagam.

His principal opponents included Ma. Subramanian of the Dravida Munnetra Kazhagam (DMK), Srividya G. of the Naam Tamilar Katchi (NTK), and Senthamizhan G. of the Amma Makkal Munnetra Kazhagam (AMMK).

Arul Prakasam won the election with 81,205 votes, defeating Ma. Subramanian by a margin of 28,514 votes.

The constituency was previously represented by Ma. Subramanian of the DMK, who had won the seat in the 2021 Tamil Nadu Legislative Assembly election.

== Electoral record ==
Year	Constituency	Party	Votes	Margin	Result
2026	Saidapet	Tamilaga Vettri Kazhagam	81,205	28,514	Won

== See also ==
- Tamilaga Vettri Kazhagam
- Saidapet Assembly constituency
- 2026 Tamil Nadu Legislative Assembly election
- Vijay (actor)
