= Republican Party of India =

Indian political party

- Founder: Dadasaheb Gaikwad; N. Sivaraj; Yashwant Ambedkar; P. T. Borale; A. G. Pawar; Datta Katti; Dadasaheb Rupwate; Abba P. T. Madhale
- Founded: 3 October 1957
- Preceded by: Scheduled Castes Federation
- Succeeded by: Republican Party of India (Athawale) of Ramdas Athawale; Peoples Republican Party of Jogendra Kawade; Republican Party of India (United); Republican Party of India (Gavai) of Rajendra Gavai; Vanchit Bahujan Aghadi; Rashtriya Republican Party of Annasaheb Katare; Republican Party of India (S); Bahujan Samaj Party
- Ideology: Constitutionalism; Republicanism; Ambedkarism; Progressivism; Secularism; Egalitarianism
- Colours: Blue
- ECI status: Dissolved

The Republican Party of India (RPI, often called the Republican Party or simply Republican) was a political party in India. It had its roots in the All-India Scheduled Castes Federation led by N. Sivaraj and B. R. Ambedkar. The party established by Ambedkar in 1956 was to serve as an entry point to the Republican Party of India (RPI).

== Origins ==
=== Scheduled Castes Federation ===
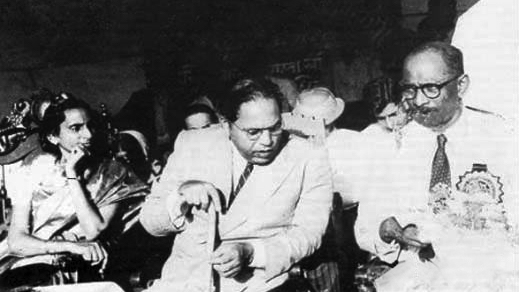
Annai Meenambal (L), B. R. Ambedkar (C) and N. Sivaraj (R) during "The All India SCF women's conference" held at Bombay, on May 6, 1945.

The origins of the AISCF can be traced to the Madras Depressed Classes Federation, established by Rettamalai Srinivasan and N. Sivaraj. This organisation was later renamed the Madras Scheduled Castes Party in 1936 and subsequently became the Madras Scheduled Castes Federation (SCF) in 1938. Meanwhile, in 1936, Ambedkar had founded the Independent Labour Party (ILP), which was primarily active in the former Bombay and Central Provinces.

In 1942, the Madras SCF and the ILP were reorganised and merged to form The All-India Scheduled Castes Federation (AISCF) in Allahabad by N. Sivaraj and B. R. Ambedkar to advocate for the rights of the Dalit community. During its founding convention, an executive body was elected, with N. Sivaraj from Madras State serving as President and P. N. Rajbhoj from Bombay State as General Secretary. Among the founding members was P. T. Madhale, along with others.

In Bengal the Scheduled Castes Federation chapter led by Jogendra Nath Mandal championed maintaining the province united, a position the party shared with the Muslim League. When Pakistan was formed, Mandal joined the first Dominion of Pakistan government as Minister of Law and Labour . In parallel Ambedkar held the post of Minister of Law in the Dominion of India. Historian Ramnarayan Rawat has noted that the SCF "created the space for an alternative to Congress-type 'nationalist' politics in post-1947 Uttar Pradesh".

=== Republican Party of India ===
On 30 September 1956, B. R. Ambedkar had announced the establishment of the "Republican Party of India" by dissolving the "Scheduled Castes Federation", but before the formation of the party, he died on 6 December 1956. After that, his followers and activists planned to form this party. A meeting of the Presidency was held at Nagpur on 1 October 1957 to establish the party. At this meeting, N. Sivaraj, Yashwant Ambedkar, P. T. Borale, A. G. Pawar, Datta Katti, Dadasaheb Rupwate, Abba P. T. Madhale were present. The Republican Party of India was formed on 3 October 1957. N. Sivaraj was elected as the President of the party.

In 1957, six members of the party were elected to the second Lok Sabha. This is the biggest achievement of Ambedkar's party so far.

== Factionalism ==
After Ambedkar's death, RPI suffered severe internal strife. Several distinct parties claim the name of RPI. There are more than 50 factions of RPI. In 2009, all factions of RPI except Prakash Ambedkar's Bharipa Bahujan Mahasangh reunited to form a united "Republican Party of India (United)". One of the main people responsible for this was Rabbi Madan. Later, Republican Party of India (Gavai) and Republican Party of India (A) led by Ramdas Athawale split again from the united party. Successors of the RPI are:

- Republican Party of India (Athawale)
- Peoples Republican Party
- Republican Party of India (United)
- Republican Party of India (Gavai)
- Bharipa Bahujan Mahasangh
- Rashtriya Republican Party
- Republican Party of India (S)
- Bahujan Samaj Party
