= V. Perumal =

Indian politician

V. Perumal was elected to the Tamil Nadu Legislative Assembly from the Saidapet constituency in the 2001 elections. He was a candidate of the Dravida Munnetra Kazhagam (DMK) party. Later he was died in 2001.
