= S. Satyamurti =

Indian politician (1877–1943)

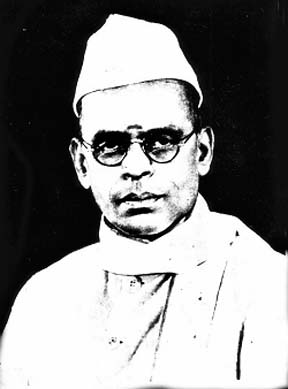
- Satyamurti c. 1940
- Born: Sundara Sastri Satyamurti; 19 August 1887; Thirumayam, Pudukkottai State, British India
- Died: 28 March 1943 (aged 55); Madras, Madras Presidency, British India
- Occupations: Politician, lawyer

Sundara Sastri Satyamurti (19 August 1887 – 28 March 1943) was an Indian independence activist and politician. He was acclaimed for his rhetoric and was one of the leading politicians of the Indian National Congress from the Madras Presidency, alongside S. Srinivasa Iyengar, C. Rajagopalachari and T. Prakasam. Satyamurti is regarded as the mentor of K. Kamaraj, the Chief Minister of Madras State from 1954 to 1962.

Born in 1887 in Thirumayam in the princely state of Pudukkottai, Satyamurti studied at the Maharajah's College, Madras Christian College and the Madras Law College. After practising as a lawyer for some time, Satyamurti entered politics at the suggestion of S. Srinivasa Iyengar, a leading lawyer and politician, who would later become his mentor.

Satyamurti participated in protests against the Partition of Bengal, Rowlatt Act and the Jallianwala Bagh massacre and the Simon Commission. Satyamurti was jailed in 1942 for his activities during the Quit India Movement. He was later released, but died on 28 March 1943, due to heart failure.

Satyamurti was the President of the provincial wing of the Swaraj Party from 1930 to 1934 and the Tamil Nadu Congress Committee from 1936 to 1939. He was a member of the Imperial Legislative Council from 1934 to 1940 and Mayor of Madras from 1939 to 1943.

== Early life ==
S. Satyamurti was born at Tirumayam in Pudukkottai state on 19 August 1887. At school he was a fine and diligent student, characteristics which he carried on into his political career. He graduated from Madras Christian College and later went on to practice law as an advocate before entering in the nationalist movement. He entered politics at an early age, winning college elections and eventually emerging as one of the foremost leaders of the Indian National Congress and a doyen of the freedom movement. In 1919, when the Congress decide to send its representative to the Joint Parliamentary Committee (of the UK) to protest the Montagu–Chelmsford Reforms and the Rowlatt Act, 32-year-old Satyamurti was chosen as a delegate. When in Britain, he functioned as the London Correspondent of The Hindu, in place of the actual Correspondent who had taken a 10-day leave of absence. He was known for his honesty, his integrity, his belief in racial, communal and religious harmony and equality, and his firm belief in constitutional government and parliamentary democracy in India, which led him to take a view opposed to Gandhi's which in the 1920s was not for participating in the colonial legislature. He was also noted to be strongly opposed to the Caste System in India.

== Political life ==
Satyamurti joined the Indian National Congress when he was a young man. At the time the party advocated racial equality between Europeans and Indians of all creeds and castes. They demanded Dominion Status within the British Empire, which the British rulers had refused to grant.

Satyamurti was one of the leaders of the Swarajist movementsists who laid the foundation for parliamentary democracy in India, the others being Chittaranjan Das and Motilal Nehru. It required extraordinary courage of conviction to take a view opposed to Gandhi, who had captivated the entire nation, which in the 1920s was not for participating in legislative politics. But, it was left to the people like Satyamurti, Das and Motilal Nehru to project the need for acquiring experience in legislature. Therefore, though Gandhi did not approve of the objective of the Swarajists, he did not stop them from pursuing their own path.

It was due to Satyamurti's efforts in the legislature that the Congress won the 1937 elections to the Madras Legislative Assembly.

When Satyamurti became the Mayor of Madras in 1939, World War II had begun. The city of Madras was in the grip of an acute water scarcity and it was left to him to impress upon the British Government and colonial Governor the importance of agreeing to the proposal of Madras Corporation for building a reservoir in Poondi, about 50 km west of the city, to augment the water supply, especially in light of catastrophic global events namely the Second World War. In those days, the tenure of Mayorship was only for a year but due to his efforts, diplomacy in dealing with the British Governor, and his administrative abilities, the foundation stone for the reservoir was laid in a matter of eight months. Though Satyamurti was not alive to see the commissioning of the reservoir in 1944, the completion of the work in four years is considered, even by today's standards, something that is difficult to match. Even now, the Poondi reservoir is the only reservoir built purely for the purpose of Madras water requirements.

== Political mentor ==
Satyamurti is also remembered today as the political mentor of Kumaraswami Kamaraj, who was the Chief Minister of the State between 1954–1963. Because of his strong devotion to Satyamurti, Kamaraj got the Poondi reservoir named after Satyamurti. Additionally, the headquarters of the Tamil Nadu Congress Committee was named Satyamurti Bhavan in his honour and in recognition for the work that he did for the Tamil Nadu Congress and for the goal of Indian independence as a parliamentary democracy.

== Champion of the arts ==
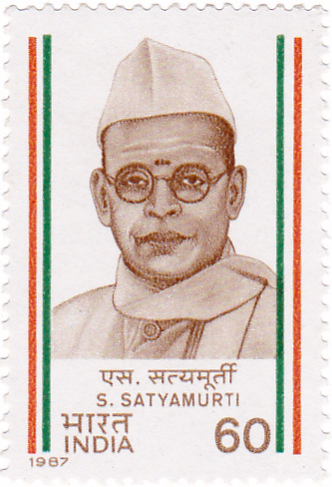
Satyamurti on a 1987 stamp of India

Satyamurti was instrumental in the setting up of the Music Academy of Madras. As President of the Faculty of Fine Arts, University of Madras, and the Chairman of the Board of Studies in Music, he was an active member of the Madras University Syndicate and was associated with the founding of the Annamalai University.

When E. Krishna Iyer championed the revival of Bharata Natyam, one of the major classic Indian dance traditions and its introduction in the Music Academy, Satyamurti supported the move. At the golden jubilee celebrations of the Congress in 1935, he arranged Bharata Natyam recitals in the Khadi and Swadeshi Exhibition. In his address at the Conference organised by the Academy in December 1935, Satyamurti praised the Academy for restoring Bharata Natyam to its "pristine place of honour".

In earlier years, he had been an accomplished stage actor in classic drama, playing the title role in Manohara, a didactic historical play. Satyamurti was elected President of South Indian Film Chambers in 1937 and 1938, and was invited to preside over the All India Motion Picture Congress at Bombay in 1939.

== Arrests and death ==
Like many other prominent Indian patriots, Satyamurti was arrested and incarcerated numerous times by the British. He was arrested in 1930 while trying to hoist the Indian flag atop Parthasarathy Temple in Madras. He was also actively involved in the Swadeshi movement and was arrested in 1942 for performing 'Individual satyagraha' at the height of the Quit India Movement. He was tried and deported to Amravathi Jail in Nagpur and endured a spinal cord injury during the journey. He succumbed to his injuries at General Hospital, Madras on 28 March 1943, two years before the end of WWII (15 August 1945) and four years before India's Independence (15 August 1947). He was a highly regarded politician of rare abilities, deeply mourned by his colleagues and the people of Madras Presidency, to whom he had dedicated his life to bringing freedom and justice. The prominent Madras paper The Hindu dedicated a column to Satyamurti under the caption "Tribune of the people". It said, "He was a born freedom-fighter, a leadmine fighter as the Scots say, to whom the fight was the thing."

Satyamurti is the uncle of Professor Bala V. Balachandran, founder and Dean of Great Lakes Institute of Management, a business school located in Chennai. Satyamurti's daughter Lakshmi Krishnamurti (1925–2009) was a popular politician and author who served in the Madras Legislative Council.

== Honours ==
Satyamurti's work led to him being called Dheerar. A stamp commemorating him was released in 1987. On 1 October 2002, a statue of him was unveiled in the Parliament House by A.P.J. Abdul Kalam. This statue was donated by former Union minister Subramanian Swamy.

| Preceded by K. Venkataswami Naidu | Mayor of Madras; 1939–1940 | Succeeded by C. Basudev |
