= D. Purushothaman =

Indian politician

D. Purushothaman 1933-2023 was an Indian politician and former Member of the Legislative Assembly of Tamil Nadu. He was elected to the Tamil Nadu legislative assembly from Saidapet constituency as a Dravida Munnetra Kazhagam candidate in 1977, and 1980 elections.
