= S. D. Pears =

British civil engineer

- Born: Steuart Durand Pears; 24 February 1859; Ootacamund, British India
- Died: 2 February 1953 (aged 93); Kersbrook Cottage, Lyme Regis, Dorset, England
- Education: Clifton College
- Occupations: civil engineer and administrator
- Known for: served in the Public Works Department (PWD) of the Madras Government
- Notable work: in charge of the Mullaperiyar Dam project
- Father: Colonel Arnold Christian Pears

Steuart Durand Pears (24 February 1859 – 2 February 1953) was a British civil engineer and administrator who served as President of the Madras Corporation from 1902 to 1906.

== Biography ==
Born in Ootacamund, British India to Colonel Arnold Christian Pears, Pears was educated at Clifton College and left for India in July 1877. His younger brother was Sir Edmund Radcliffe Pears.

He died at Kersbrook Cottage, Lyme Regis, Dorset, aged 93.

== Career ==
Pears served in the Public Works Department (PWD) of the Madras Government from 1877 to 1896. From 1893 to 1896, he was in charge of the Mullaperiyar Dam project.
