= Vengal Chakkarai =

Vengal Chakkarai Chettiar
- வெங்கல் சக்கரைச் செட்டியார்

11th Mayor of Madras
- In office November 1941 – 1942
- Preceded by: G. Janakiram Chetty
- Succeeded by: C. Tadulinga Mudaliar

President of All India Trade Union Congress (Tamil Nadu unit)
- In office 1943–1945

President of All India Trade Union Congress
- In office 30 May 1954 – 29 Dec 1957
- Preceded by: S.A. Dange
- Succeeded by: S.S. Mirajkar

Personal details
- Born: 12 December 1878 or 17 January 1880 Madras, Madras Presidency, British India (now Chennai, Tamil Nadu, India)
- Died: 14 June 1958 (aged 78-79) Madras, Madras State (now Chennai, Tamil Nadu), India
- Party: Indian National Congress Justice Party
- Relations: P. Chenchiah (brother-in-law); V. Vasanthi Devi (granddaughter)
- Parent(s): Andal Ammal (mother); Kesavalu Chettiar (father)
- Education: B.A., Law degree
- Alma mater: Madras Christian College; Madras Law College
- Occupation: Lawyer, trade unionist, politician, social activist, theologian
- Known for: Founder of Chennai Labour Union, Indian independence activist

Vengal Chakkarai Chettiar (17 January 1880 – 14 June 1958) was an Indian Christian theologian, missionary, independence activist, politician and trade unionist. He was president of AITUC from 1954 to 1957.

== Early life ==
Chakkarai was born to a Hindu Chettiar family. He was educated at the Scottish Mission School, Madras Christian College, graduating in 1901 after majoring in philosophy. He then studied at Madras Law College, and practiced for some time as a lawyer.

== Career ==
In 1913, Chakkarai joined the Danish Mission Room as a Christian preacher and worked as a missionary for twenty years. During these years, he also became a disciple of Mahatma Gandhi and participated in the Indian independence movement. He served as the Mayor of Madras from 1941 to 1942. He was the president of the Tamil Nadu unit of All India Trade Union Congress (AITUC) from 1943 to 1945, and as the all-India president of AITUC from 30 May 1954 to 29 December 1957.

== Theology ==
Chakkarai was baptised as a Christian on February 22, 1903.

He was a member of the Rethinking Christianity group along with his brother-in-law,Pandipeddi Chenchiah. He believed in the Indianisation of Christianity, although the anti-colonial feeling of the time led many people to feel that an Indian could not be a Christian without abandoning their Indian culture. Instead he suggested that Christians should refuse allegiance to earthly states and overcome their nationalistic behaviour.

He tried to explain the Christian faith through the Hinduism point of view. This can be seen when he tried to find the meaning of the Christian cross for the followers of Christianity in how it could bring moksha.

Some of the Chakkarai's views about Christianity included:

- Jesus is truly human (sat purusa).
- The Holy Spirit is Christ himself, who continues to exist and work until now.
- God cannot be seen as the creator of sin.
- Humans themselves are responsible for the sins that they commit.
- Knowledge of God is not something that is intellectual (jnana), but a personal experience of God (anubhava).
- Sin is seen as the handcuffs (pasa), which prevents the human soul (pasu) to reach God.
- The essence of sin is the desire to find "the mystery of the forbidden".

== Publications ==
- Jesus the Avatar (1927)
- The Cross and Indian Thought (1932)
- A selection (Library of Indian Christian theology)

== Death ==
He died on 14 June 1958.

== Descendants ==
His daughter's daughter, V. Vasanthi Devi is an educationist and social activist. She served as Vice-Chancellor of Manonmaniam Sundaranar University (1992–98) and as Chairperson of the Tamil Nadu State Commission for Women (2002–05).

Preceded by G. Janakiram Chetty	Mayor of Madras; 1941-1942	Succeeded by C. Tadulinga Mudaliar
