= Master C. V. V. =

Indian philosopher, yogi, and guru (1868–1922)

Master C.V.V.
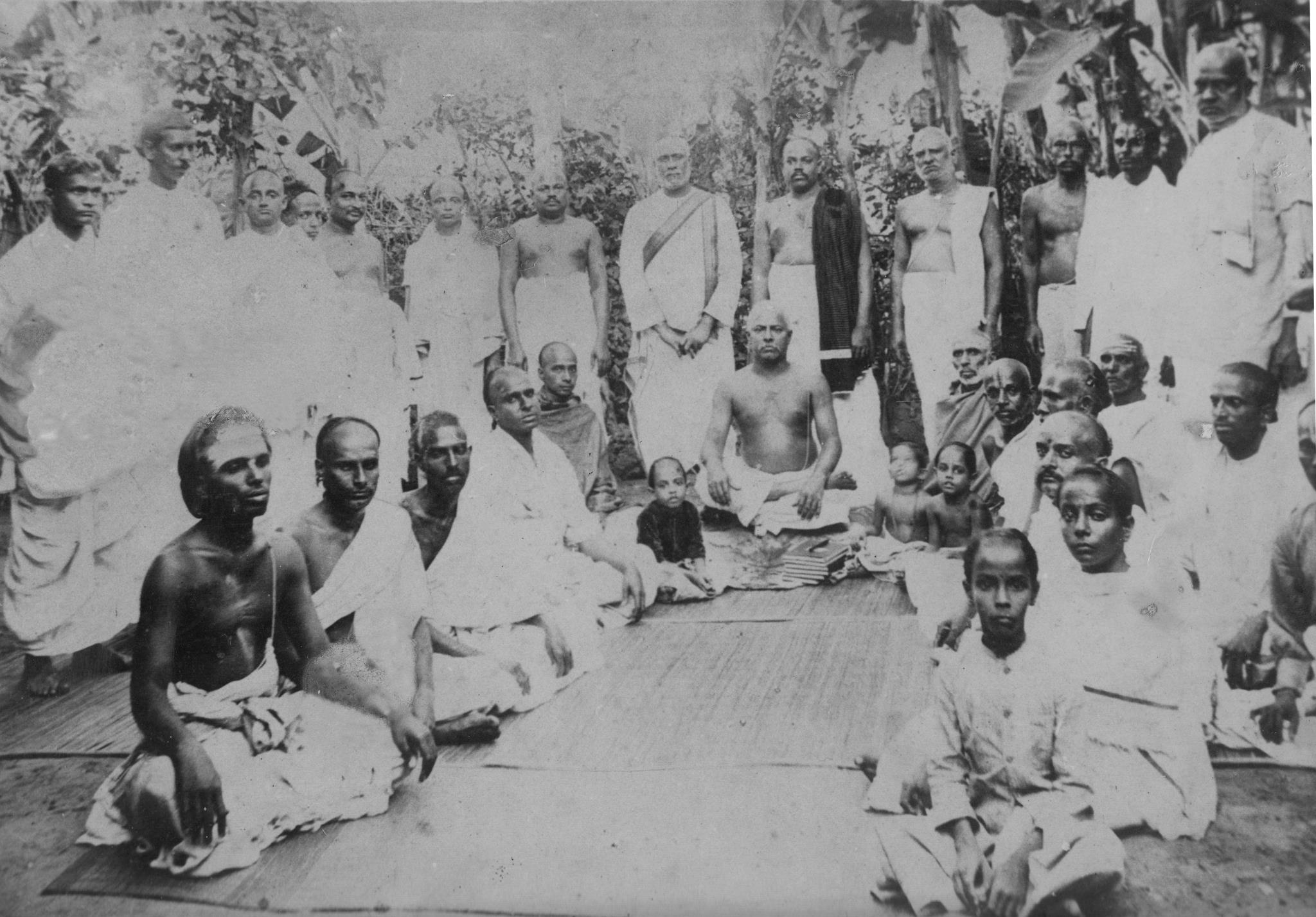
- Master C.V.V with his disciples in December 1912

Personal life
- Born: Canchupati Venkatarao Venkaswami Rao; August 4, 1868 Kumbakonam, British India (now part of Tamil Nadu, India)
- Died: May 12, 1922 (aged 53) Kumbakonam, British India
- Spouse: Rukmini (m. 1880; died 1904) Venkamma (m. 1906; died 1922) (until his death)

Religious life
- Religion: Hinduism
- Founder of: Yoga Line ( called by others as Bhrikta Rahita Taraka Raja Yoga)
- Philosophy: Yoga (To improvise common human format)

Religious career
- Disciples: 751 members till 31.1.1922
- Website: www.mastercvv.com

Canchupati Venkatarao Venkaswami Rao(4 August 1868 – 12 May 1922), referred as Master C.V.V. in his own handwritten original writings, was an Indian philosopher, yogi, and guru. Master C.V.V. served as the Chairman of Kumbakonam Municipal Council for some time and later carried out successful spiritual experimentations on changes in human format design. He wrote of such experiments in Tamil and thousands of pages of such hand written notes provide the details of the complexities involved in this process.

== Biography ==
Master C.V.V. was born on 4 August 1868 in Kumbakonam, Tamil Nadu, India (then part of British India) into a middle class Telugu Brahmin family. His family name was Canchupati. His parents are Sri Kuppuswamy Iyyengar and Smt. Kamamma. During the reign of the Vijayanagar dynasty, their family moved from the regions of Andhra Pradesh to Tamil Nadu. His Upanayana took place at the age of five. He was given in adoption to his paternal aunt Srimathi Kanchupati Subbamma, who educated him. His elementary education took place in Kumbhakonam itself and his higher education in Srirangam.

== Personal life ==
Master C.V.V. married Rukmini in 1880 when he was 12 years old and they had three sons and a daughter. His wife Rukmini died in 1904 when she was 36 years old, supposedly due to spiritual processes taking place in Master C.V.V. physical and metaphysical bodies. This was documented by him in the notes volume 'Memory, Memorandum'. At the age of 38 in 1908 he married Venkamma with whom he had another three daughters and a son.

== Philosophy and spiritual ideas ==
Master C.V.V. founded a yoga system called the "Yoga Line" (also called "Bhrikta Rahita Taraka Raja Yoga", among other names) in 1910 with a goal to make changes to human format and to cosmic forces that influence the human format in order to give eternal life to humanity.

Master C.V.V. called his disciples “mediums”. At present Master C.V.V. yoga is found in divergent forms. His followers claim that his original literature is the authentic source of the information on this Yoga Line.

During his lifetime, Master C.V.V. developed several courses that aim to regulate the planets and rectifications. Several “creation forces”, and souls that supposedly attained certain spiritual height can be found in his writings. He wrote of these under the initials MTA.

Master C.V.V. did not release this line for others to practice after he died. Master C.V.V. closed admissions to this line on January 31st, 1922 as found in his diary published by the followers.

However, some people continue to recite a prayer he created.

=== Master C.V.V. Namaskaram ===
During the prayer, one must hold the following thoughts:

"Please make the entire Universe and myself happy.

The past and present karmic effects be evaporated.

Atom is the cause of my birth.

Any defects in this atom shall be rectified.

I must stand as physically eternal with flesh and

blood in this birth only, but not in the next birth.

Namaskaram."

Note: The mantra "Master C.V.V. Namaskaram" should not be repeated more than once or twice. It should not be chanted in the manner of other mantras.

== Books ==
1. Master C.V.V's Yoga Basic Information - Telugu & English based on Original writings (https://archive.org/details/master-cvvs-yoga-basic-information)
