= R. Sivasankar Mehta =

Indian businessman and politician

Ramanatha Sivasankar Mehta was an Indian businessman and politician who served as mayor of Madras city from 1963 to 1964 and as member of the Madras Legislative Council.

== Personal life ==
Sivasankar Mehta was born in Madras to T. Ramanatha Mehta. The family's ancestors had migrated to Thanjavur from Gujarat in the 17th century. Ramanatha Mehta's grandfather T. Balakrishna Mehta had founded the jewellery firm T. B. Mehta and Sons in 1871–72.
