= Muhammad Bazullah =

Indian civil servant and administrator

Khan Bahadur Muhammad Bazullah Sahib Bahadur was an Indian civil servant and administrator who served as Chairman of the Corporation of Madras from 1920 to 1923 and as president and Mayor in 1919.

He also served as Member of First Madras Public Services Commission from 1930 to 1932 (Now Tamil Nadu Public Service Commission), then become its chairman from 1932 to 1935.
