= K. Kamalakannan =

Indian businessman and politician (1912–1981)

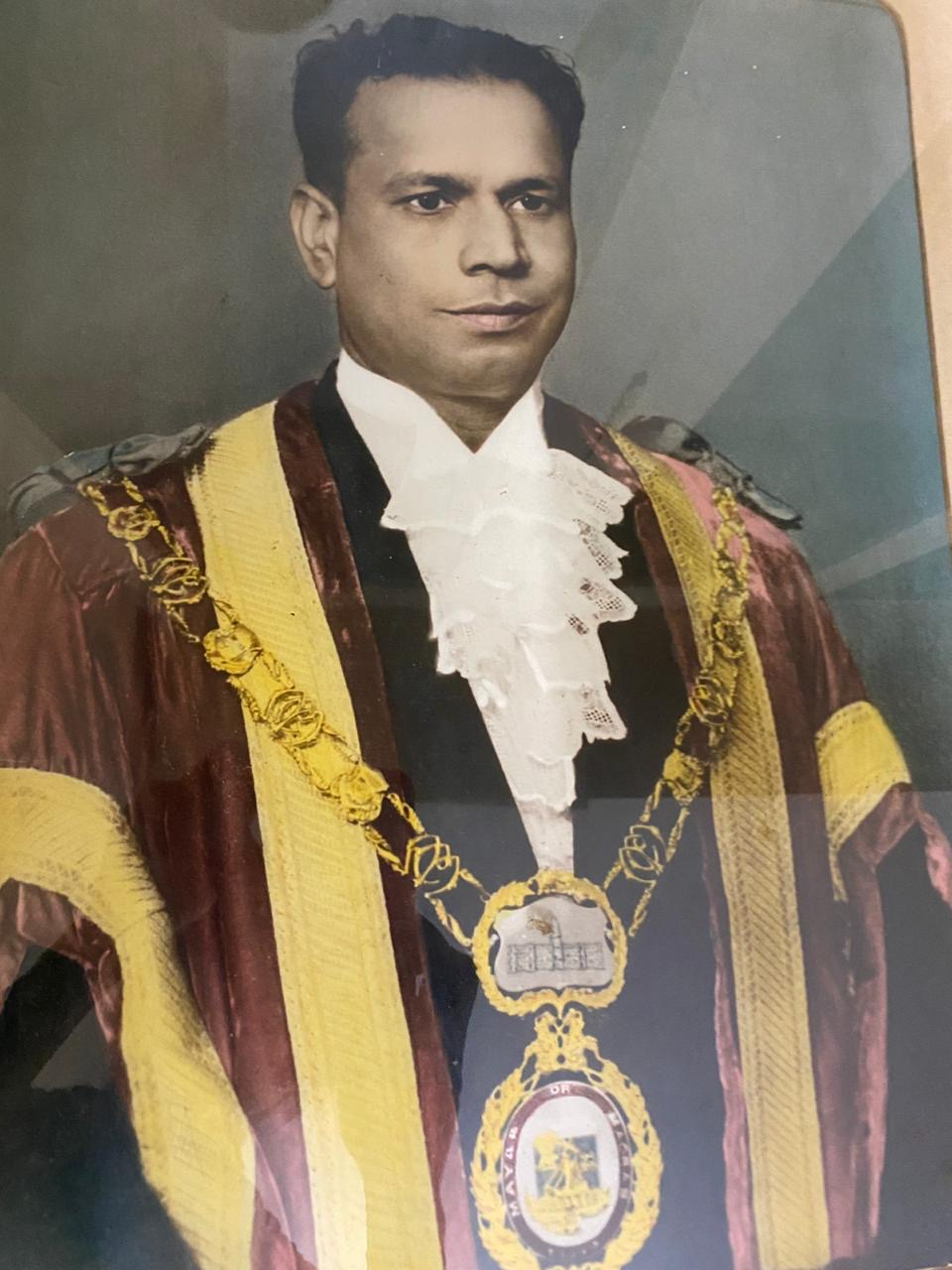

K. Kamalakannan (born 11 August 1912 – 24 March 1981) was an Indian politician, engineering contractor, agriculturist, and landowner who was mayor of Madras from November 1958 to April 1959. He was a member of the Indian National Congress. He was born in a Tuluva vellala Mudaliar family and a native of Arungal village in Guduvancheri and was educated at Pachaiappa's College. He was married to the late K.Nethrambigai, and is survived by his two children, K. Vivekanandan and D. Shanthi, and several grandchildren.
