= Kamakshi Jayaraman =

Indian politician

Kamakshi Jayaraman is the first woman mayor of the city corporation of Chennai, Tamil Nadu.

== Mayor of Chennai ==
Kamakshi Jayaraman belongs to the party of Dravida Munnetra Kazhagam. She was elected as the first woman mayor of Chennai Corporation in history in the year of 1971.
