= V. R. Ramanatha Iyer =

Indian politician

Mayor of Madras

Personal details
- Born: 1896
- Died: 1965 (aged 68–69)

V. R. Ramanatha Iyer served as mayor of Madras.
