= G. M. J. Moore =

British Army officer and administrator

Lieutenant-Colonel Sir George Montgomerie John Moore CIE (22 November 1844 – 5 April 1911) was a British army officer and administrator who served as President of the Corporation of Madras from 1886 to 1902. Moore is remembered for the creation of Moore Market which was later named after him.

Moore was born in British India, the son of Capt. Thomas Palmer Moore and his wife, Janet. He was baptised in Berhampore, Madras.

Moore was District Grand Master for Madras in the Masonic United Grand Lodge of England.
