= Tara Cherian =

Indian social activist and politician

Tara Cherian (May 1913 - 7 November 2000) was an Indian social activist and politician. She was the first woman mayor of Madras city. The Government of India awarded her the civilian honour of the Padma Bhushan in 1967.

== Early life ==
Tara was born in May 1913 and graduated from the Madras University. On completion of her studies, Tara plunged into social activism and joined the Guild of Service.

== As Mayor ==
Like her husband P. V. Cherian, Tara was nominated mayor of Madras in November 1957. She was the first woman to hold the post. Her tenure is notable for the introduction of the mid-day meals scheme in the city.
