= J. C. Molony =

John Chartres Molony (27 February 1877 – 5 September 1948) was an administrator and civil servant of the Indian civil service.

== Early life ==
Molony was born on 27 February 1877 at Ennis in County Clare, Ireland to James Barry Molony and Ellen Greene. Molony had his schooling at Portora Royal School, Enniskillen and graduated from Trinity College Dublin. Molony passed the Indian civil service examination in 1899.

== Career ==
Molony arrived in India in 1900 and was appointed Assistant Collector and Magistrate in the Madras Presidency and later rose to become District Collector. From 1908 to 1910, Molony served as Assistant Political Agent to the state of Banganapalle. Molony was the Census Commissioner for the Madras Presidency during the 1911 India census.

Molony served as president and Mayor of the Madras Corporation from 1914 to 1919 and City Commissioner in 1920. Molony retired from the Indian civil service in 1925 and returned to the United Kingdom

== Death ==
Molony died on 5 September 1948 at the age of 71.

== Works ==
- As "Civilian" (1921), The Civilian's South India: Some Places and People in Madras, London: Lane Bodley, ISBN 9788120616844.
- A book of South India. London: Methuen. 1926.
- The riddle of the Irish. Methuen. 1927.
- Ireland. Arrowsmith. 1936.
