= 2026 in Indian public domain =

Public Domain Day 2026 in India
- Nickname: Public Domain Day
- Date: January 1, 2026
- Frequency: Annually
- Country: India
- Previous event: 2025
- Next event: 2027

When a work's copyright expires, it enters the public domain, becoming free for anyone to use, adapt, and share without restriction. The following is a comprehensive list of creators and works whose copyrights expire in India on January 1, 2026, as per the Copyright law of India.

== Background on Indian Copyright Law ==
The Indian Copyright Act of 1957 governs copyright protection in India. Key provisions include:

- Literary, dramatic, musical, and artistic works: Protected for the lifetime of the author plus 60 years
- Cinematograph films, sound recordings, photographs: Protected for 60 years from first publication
- Government works: Protected for 60 years from first publication
- Anonymous and pseudonymous works: Protected for 60 years from first publication

== Public Domain Day 2026 Overview ==
Public Domain Day 2026 marks the entry of numerous significant works into the public domain in India, including:

- Works by authors who died in 1965
- Films first published in 1965
- Photographs, sound recordings, and government publications from 1965
- Anonymous and pseudonymous works from 1965

This represents a significant cultural heritage becoming freely accessible to the public, researchers, educators, and creators.

== Works Entering Public Domain in 2026 ==
=== Literary Works (Author-based) ===
These works enter the public domain 60 years after the author's death (or, in the case of a multi-author work, the death of the last surviving author), counted from the beginning of the following calendar year

==== List of Authors and their works entering Public Domain ====
Name	Date of birth	Date of death	Occupation	Notable Works Entering into Public Domain	Original Language of works
G. N. Balasubramaniam	6 January 1910	1 May 1965	Carnatic vocalist	Composed over 250 kritis and invented new ragas (Chandrahasita, Sivasakti). Known for renditions like "Brochevarevarura". Acted in films like Sakuntalai (1940).	Tamil
Satinath Bhaduri	27 September 1906	30 March 1965	Novelist	"Jagari" (1946, Rabindra Puraskar winner), "Dhorai Charita Manas" (1949/1951), "Gananayak" (1948), "Chitragupter File" (1949)	Bengali
Dhumketu (Gaurishankar Joshi)	1 January 1892	1 January 1965	Short story writer, novelist	"Post Office" (short story), "Tankha" (short story collection), historical novels like "Chauladevi" (1940) and "Aamrapali" (1954).	Gujarati
Zinda Kaul	1 August 1884	1 January 1965	Poet	"Sumran" poetry collection (first Kashmiri work to win Sahitya Akademi Award in 1956).	Kashmiri
Balwantrai Mehta	19 February 1900	19 September 1965	Politician, Chief Minister of Gujarat	Chaired the committee that recommended the three-tier Panchayati Raj system, earning him the title "Architect of Panchayati Raj."	Gujarati
Ardeshir Darabshaw Shroff	1 January 1899	1 January 1965	Industrialist, economist	Co-author of the "Bombay Plan" (1944), a plan for India's post-war economy, and represented India at the Bretton Woods Conference.	English
Swami Madhavananda	5 December 1888	6 October 1965	Religious leader, writer	Translations of Hindu scriptures, including the "Brihadaranyaka Upanishad" with Shankara's commentary, and "Vivekachudamani".	English, Bengali
Ullaskar Dutta	16 April 1885	17 May 1965	Revolutionary, writer	Memoir "Amar Karajiban" ("Twelve Years of Prison Life") on his imprisonment for revolutionary activities, including his role in the Alipore Bomb Conspiracy.	Bengali
Thanjai N. Ramaiah Dass	5 June 1914	15 January 1965	Tamil writer	Wrote dialogues and lyrics for over 100 films, including "Missiamma" (1955) and the popular song "Jaalilo Jimkhaanaa".	Tamil
Godabarish Mohapatra	10 January 1898	25 November 1965	Writer, humorist	Award-winning poetry collections "Kanta O Phula" and "Banka O Sidha". Famous short story "Magunira Shagada". Edited the satirical magazine "Niankhunta".	Odia
Sundaram Seshu	1 June 1926	1 January 1965	Electrical Engineer & Professor	Co-authored "Linear Network Analysis" (1959) and "Linear Graphs and Electrical Networks" (1961).	English
Ganesh Bodas	1 January 1880	1 January 1965	Theatre artist	Known for roles like Phalgunrao in "Samshaykallol". Author of autobiography "Majhi bhumika" (1940).	Marathi
Muhammad Yusuf Kandhalawi	22 March 1917	1 January 1965	Islamic scholar	"Hayat Al-Sahaba" and "Muntakhab Ahadith".	Urdu, Arabic
Abinash Chandra Ghoshal	1 January 1898	1 January 1965	Writer	"Mrittika" (poetry collection), "Nabajug" (essays), edited "Bharati" literary journal	Bengali
Abdul Hameed Khan	1 January 1894	1 January 1965	Politician	Member of Madras Legislative Council (1927-1936) and editor-in-chief of The Deccan Times.	English, Urdu
Braja Mohan Panda	1 January 1890	1 January 1965	Educator & Poet	Founder of Larambha High School (1938) and Larambha College (1964).	Odia
Ashok Guha	1 January 1911	1 January 1965	Writer	"Shesh Parikalpana" (novel), "Nayan O Nandini" (short stories), "Ekti Banshi Batas" (poetry)	Bengali
Somanchi Vasudeva Rao	1 January 1902	1 January 1965	Writer	"Shivanandalahari", "Stutiratnamalika" (1961), "Sri Nirvachana Sundarakanda" (1961).	Telugu, Sanskrit
Chaudry Mohammad Aslam	1 January 1900	1 January 1965	Mathematician & Cartographer	Surveyor General of Pakistan; Mapped North West Frontier province, demarcated borders for East and West Pakistan and with Persia.	English
C. Tadulinga Mudaliar	1 January 1878	1 January 1965	Botanist	Co-authored "A Handbook of Some South Indian Grasses" (1921) and "A Handbook of Some South Indian Weeds" (1932).	English, Latin
Rameshwar Prasad Sinha		1 January 1965	Politician, writer	Political writings	English, Hindi
Rajalakshmi	2 June 1930	18 January 1965	Writer	"Oru Sylluvinte Kadha" (short story collection), "Njanenna Bhavam" (novel), award-winning story "Thrihasikha"	Malayalam
Tamil Oli	21 September 1924	24 March 1965	Writer	"Kadaloram" (poetry collection), "Thenmazhai" (short stories), social reform essays in "Tamil Murasu"	Tamil
Kedarnath Chattopadhyay	12 December 1891	16 May 1965	Writer	"Bharater Swadhinata Sangram" (freedom movement history), "Bangla Sahitya Parichay" (literary guide), historical biographies	Bengali
Ibrahim Raza Khan	1 January 1907	12 June 1965	Religious scholar	"Tafseer-e-Quran" (Quranic exegesis), "Seerat-un-Nabi" (Prophet's biography), Islamic jurisprudence treatises	Urdu, Arabic
Jyotirmoy Ghosh	1 January 1896	19 June 1965	Writer	"Shahitya Charcha" (literary criticism), "Bangla Kavita" (poetry analysis), editor of "Prabasi" journal	Bengali
Prabodhendunath Tagore	1 January 1907	28 June 1965	Writer	"Rabindranath: A Biography" (biographical work), "Tagore Family Chronicles", translated Tagore's poems to English	Bengali, English
P. J. Thomas, Parakunnel	25 February 1895	26 July 1965	Economist, writer	"The Economic Development of India", "Agricultural Problems of India", "Indian Economic Policy" analysis	English
Ishwar Chand Nanda	30 September 1892	3 September 1965	Writer	"Likhari" (play), "Punjab Di Lokdhara" (folklore studies), "Jagat Tamasha" (dramatic works)	Punjabi
Malladi Ramakrishna Sastry	16 June 1905	12 September 1965	Writer	"Andhra Vignana Sarvasvam" (encyclopedia), "Telugu Kavula Charitra" (poets' history), classical translations	Telugu
Mirza Basheer-ud-Din Mahmood Ahmad	12 January 1889	7 November 1965	Religious leader	"Haqiqat-ul-Wahi" (revelation theology), "Tafseer-e-Kabeer" (Quranic commentary), "A Message of Peace"	Urdu, Arabic, English
Durga Mohan Bhattacharyya	13 October 1899	12 November 1965	Academic, writer	"Indian Philosophy" (textbook), "Logic and Epistemology" research papers, "Sanskrit Literary Tradition"	English, Bengali
Taher Saifuddin	4 August 1888	12 November 1965	Religious leader	"Nasuhat al-Zahira" (spiritual guidance), "Al-Majalis al-Saifiyyah" (sermons collection), Dawoodi Bohra theological treatises	Arabic, Gujarati
Gunvantrai Acharya	9 September 1900	25 November 1965	Writer	"Dariyalal" (novel), "Saurashtra Ni Rasdhara" (cultural history), "Gujarati Sahityano Itihas" (literary history)	Gujarati
Asamanja Mukhopadhay	4 June 1882	1 December 1965	Writer	"Bichitra" (short story collection), "Kolkata Rajniti" (political essays), "Banger Sanskriti" (cultural studies)	Bengali
Ambalal Purani	26 May 1894	11 December 1965	Writer	"Sri Aurobindo: A Biography", "Yoga and Spiritual Life" essays, Gujarati literary criticism collections	Gujarati, English
Badri Datt Pandey	15 February 1882	13 February 1965	Historian, writer	"Kumaon Ka Itihas" (comprehensive history of Kumaon region), "Kumaoni Folklore" collection, editor of "Almora Akhbar"	Hindi, Kumaoni
Pio Gama Pinto	31 March 1927	25 February 1965	Journalist, activist	Editor of "The Daily Chronicle", "Kenya Freedom Struggle" columns, anti-colonial activist writings	English
Kartik Chandra Dasgupta	6 August 1884	27 February 1965	Writer	"Palliter Parikatha" (village chronicles), "Sambad Parichay" (literary criticism), edited "Bangashri" magazine	Bengali
Sabitri Prasanna Chattopadhyay	6 July 1898	23 March 1965	Writer	"Jhorer Dhoop" (novel), "Mukh O Mukhosh" (short stories), women's rights essays in "Sahitya Patrika"	Bengali
Hira Singh Dard	30 september 1889	22 June 1965	Writer		Punjabi

==== List of Feature Films entering Public Domain ====
Pursuant to the Indian Copyright Act of 1957, cinematograph films in India are protected for a duration of 60 years from the date of their first publication. Consequently, on January 1, 2026, a total of 387 films first published in 1965 will officially enter the public domain, becoming free for anyone to use, adapt, and share without restriction. This transition encompasses a vast array of Indian regional cinema, including the entire production catalogs for that year across multiple languages. According to archival data, the largest language-specific contributions to this cohort include 114 Hindi films, 51 Tamil films, and 51 Telugu films. The list further includes 35 Bengali films, 31 Malayalam films, 21 Kannada films, and 15 Marathi films, as well as Odia productions from 1965. This release of nearly 400 titles represents a significant expansion of accessible cultural heritage, providing a wealth of material for researchers, educators, and creators to preserve and repurpose.

- List of Indian Bengali films of 1965
- List of Kannada films of 1965
- List of Hindi films of 1965
- List of Odia films of 1965
- List of Malayalam films of 1965
- List of Marathi films of 1965
- List of Tamil films of 1965
- List of Telugu films of 1965
