= 2025 in Indian public domain =

- Nickname: Public Domain Day
- Date: January 1, 2025
- Frequency: Annually
- Country: India

When a work's copyright expires, it enters the public domain. The following is a list of creators whose works enter the public domain in 2025 as per Copyright law of India.

== List of works that are entering into public domain in India ==
=== Works Entering Public Domain After 60 Years from Author's Death ===
These works enter the public domain 60 years after the author's death (or, in the case of a multi-author work, the death of the last surviving author), counted from the beginning of the following calendar year

Name of the person	Date of birth	Date of death	Occupation	Notable Works
Jawaharlal Nehru	14 November 1889	27 May 1964	writer, politician, barrister, trade unionist, autobiographer, freedom fighter	The Discovery of India, Glimpses of World History, An Autobiography, Letters from a Father to His Daughter
Mehboob Khan	9 September 1907	28 May 1964	film director, film producer, film actor	Mother India, Andaz, Aan
Bhargavaram Viththal Varerkar	1883	1964	writer	Viththal Yashodai, Gajanan Vijay
Guru Dutt	9 July 1925	10 October 1964	screenwriter, choreographer, film director, film producer, film editor, film actor	Pyaasa, Kaagaz Ke Phool, Chaudhvin Ka Chand
J.B.S. Haldane	5 November 1892	1 December 1964	biologist, university teacher, physiologist, biochemist, geneticist, philosopher	The Causes of Evolution, Possible Worlds, On Being the Right Size, Daedalus, or Science and the Future, The Marxist Philosophy and the Sciences, The Inequality of Man, A Dialectical Account of Evolution
Amrit Kaur	2 February 1887	6 February 1964	politician, activist, freedom fighter	The Political Biography of an Indian Woman
Bastiampillai Anthonipillai Thomas	7 March 1886	26 January 1964	Catholic priest	History of Christianity in Sri Lanka
Benoytosh Bhattacharyya		1964	writer, Indologist	History of Indian Literature, Vedic Literature
Maithili Sharan Gupt	3 August 1886	12 December 1964	writer, poet, politician, translator, linguist	Rangabhoomi, Bharat-Bharati, Saket
Michael Rodrigues		1964	Catholic priest, Catholic bishop	History of Christianity in Goa
Sheikh Fattelal		1964	cinematographer, film director, production designer, film producer	Madhavpura, Kashinath
Pasupuleti Kannamba	5 October 1911	7 May 1964	actor, singer	Seetha Kalyanam, Maya Bazaar
Verrier Elwin	29 August 1902	22 February 1964	ethnologist, anthropologist, autobiographer	The Tribal World of Verrier Elwin, The Baiga
Aluru Venkata Rao	12 July 1880	25 February 1964	journalist	History of Andhra Movement
Asit Kumar Haldar	10 September 1890	13 February 1964	writer, teacher, painter	Chaya Samhita
Attoor Krishna Pisharody	29 September 1875	5 June 1964	teacher, author, musicologist	Bharatiya Sangeet
Baselios Geevarghese II	16 June 1874	3 January 1964	presbyter	Religious Teachings of Saint Thomas Christians
Biren Nag	1922	1964	art director, film director	Chandralekha, Ram Rajya
Birinchi Kumar Barua	10 November 1908	30 March 1964	poet, university teacher, literary scholar, Indologist	Shakuntala, Indology and Sanskrit Literature
Dwaram Venkataswamy Naidu	8 November 1893	25 November 1964	musician, violinist	Violin Recitals
Bhatt Mathuranath Shastri	23 March 1889	4 June 1964	poet	Brahmanand Kavya
Louisa Durrell	16 January 1886	24 January 1964	novelist	The Garden of the Gods, The Durrells of Corfu
Gajanan Madhav Muktibodh	13 November 1917	11 September 1964	writer, poet, journalist, literary critic	Bhagavad Gita aur Hindu Dharma, The Serene Walk
Gali Penchala Narasimha Rao	1903	25 May 1964	composer	Vandemataram, Deva Kanya
Komarraju Atchamamba	6 September 1906	20 October 1964	politician, gynecologist, obstetrician	Women in Society
M. H. Douglas	2 October 1910	30 March 1964	actor, stunt performer	Stunt Techniques in Cinema
N. Sivaraj	29 September 1892	29 September 1964	politician	Social Welfare and Politics in India
Naresh Chandra Sengupta	17 May 1882	19 September 1964	writer, lawyer, novelist	The People of India
Nawal Kishore Dhawal	11 November 1911	17 April 1964	writer	My Life in Literature
P. T. Chacko	9 April 1915	31 July 1964	lawyer, politician	Constitutional Law in India
Pammal Sambandha Mudaliar	9 February 1873	24 September 1964	theatrical director	Swaraj and National Drama
Phakirappa Gurubasappa Halakatti	2 July 1880	29 June 1964	writer	Makkalabharathi, Brahmanandavijay
Premankur Atorthy	1 January 1890	13 October 1964	screenwriter, actor, writer, film director, film producer	Pather Panchali, Apu Trilogy
Rajendrasinhji Jadeja	1 April 1955	14 May 1955	military personnel	Jadeja Dynasty
Samarendra Nath Roy	11 December 1906	23 July 1964	mathematician, statistician	The Statistical Theory of Probability
Shashibhusan Dasgupta	1911	21 July 1964	writer, academic	Indian Literature and Culture
T. Mariappa	1904	1964	politician	Politics in Post-Independence India
T. P. Rajalakshmi	11 November 1911	20 August 1964	film director, film actor	Sundara Kanda
Vangal Thiruvenkatachari Krishnamachari	8 February 1881	14 February 1964	politician, civil servant	The Politics of Public Service
Vaikunthbhai Mehta	26 October 1891	27 October 1964	politician, economist	Economic Development in India
Eugeniusz Banasiński		1964	diplomat	The Diplomacy of India in the 20th Century
Parvati Prasad Baruva	19 August 1904	7 June 1964	writer, poet, playwright, lyricist, film director	The Lamb of God, Vandana
Ghanshyamsinhji Daulatsinhji Jhala	23 October 1902	10 November 1964	cricketer	Cricket at Its Best
Duvvuri Subbamma	15 November 1880	31 May 1964	activist	Feminist Writings in India
Jatindranath Dowara	4 March 1892	5 July 1964	writer, poet	Dharmayudhha
Surya Kumar Bhuyan	27 January 1892	5 July 1964	poet, politician	Bengal and its People
Namdeo Jadav	18 November 1921	2 August 1984	military personnel	The Jadav Dynasty
Amritlal Hargovinddas	29 August 1889	12 December 1964	businessperson	Entrepreneurship in Colonial India
Bhargavram Vitthal Warerkar	1883	1964	politician	Political Leadership in Maharashtra
Vishwanathbuwa Jadhav	5 October 1885	1 September 1964	composer	Classical Music of India, Music Director to first sound film of India Gangavataran (directed by Phalke)
G. Ayling	14 November 1919	9 October 1964	cricket umpire, cricketer	The Role of Umpires in Cricket
Sonthi Venkata Ramamurthy	1 August 1888	19 January 1964	scientist	Theories of Science and Nature
Jogendranath Gupta	22 March 1883	31 May 1964	writer, children's writer	Stories of India
Shanta Apte	1916	1964	film actor	Maya, Pahili Mangalagaur
H. C. Dasappa	5 December 1894	16 November 1964	lawyer, politician	Indian Constitution and Social Change
Nitish Chandra Laharry	1892	21 July 1964	lawyer, film director, film producer, social worker, president of a non-profit organisation, film distributor	The Struggle for Equality
Samuel Fyzee-Rahamin	19 December 1880	1 January 1964	painter	Indian Art: The Tradition and Modernity
Ram Narayan Singh	1885	1964	politician, social worker	Social Work in India
Jibeswar Baruah	1906	1964	sculptor	Sculpture of Assam
Biswanath Pasayat		1964	writer	Indian History and Culture
Joseph Vithayathil	23 July 1865	8 June 1964	Catholic priest	Christianity in Kerala
Banarsi Prasad Sinha	7 November 1899	1964	politician	Indian Politics and Independence
Ishwar Chandra Nayak		1964	politician	The Politics of Rural India
Anandrao Krishnaji Tekade		1964	writer, singer, publisher	Songs of Maharashtra
Jadumani Mangaraj		1964	politician	History of Odisha
Ardhendu Prasad Bandopadhyay		1964	painter	The Colors of India
Janina Stroka		1964	poet, painter, mystic, diarist	The Journey of the Soul
Jahangir Edalji Sanjana	14 May 1880	17 January 1964	translator, literary critic, literary scholar	Persian Influence on Indian Literature
Narendra Nath Law		1964	writer, historian	History of India from Early Times
Narendranath Basu	6 July 1866	11 October 1938	writer	Life and Culture in Ancient India
Jaladhar Chattopadhyay		1964	lawyer, playwright	Indian Legal System
Naseeruddin Hashmi		1964	historian, archivist, biographer, researcher, travel writer, cataloger	Travels in South Asia
Kali Krishna Bhattacharya		1964	writer, lawyer	The Legal System in India
Bhudeb Sen		1964	poet	The Poems of Bhudeb Sen
Apurba Krishna Bhattacharya		1964	writer	In Search of the Past
Abaninath Mitra		1964	writer	The People of Bengal, Stories from the Himalayas
Professor Muhammad Ahmed Usmani		1964	poet, university teacher	Poems of the Soul
Abdullah Ropari	1895	20 August 1964	Islamic scholar, historian, mufti	

=== Works Entering Public Domain After 60 Years from Publication ===
These works enter the public domain 60 years after the date of first publication, counted from the beginning of the following calendar year:

- Anonymous works
- Photographs
- Cinematographic works (aka movies/films)
- Sound recordings
- Government works
- Works of corporate authorship or of international organizations

==== Movies ====
Title	Original Language	Director
Dosti	Hindi	Satyen Bose
Kashmir Ki Kali	Hindi	Shakti Samanta
Aap Ki Parchhaiyan	Hindi	Mohan Kumar
Dulha Dulhan	Hindi	Ravindra Dave
Dheiva Thaai	Tamil	P. Madhavan
Andavan Kattalai	Tamil	K. Shankar
Poompuhar	Tamil	P. Neelakantan
Karnan	Tamil	B. R. Panthulu
Bharthavu	Malayalam	M. Krishnan Nair
Ayee Milan Ki Bela	Hindi	Mohan Kumar
Bhargavi Nilayam	Malayalam	A. Vincent
Apne Huye Paraye	Hindi	Ajit Chakraborty
Kaadhalikka Neramillai	Tamil	C. V. Sridhar
Devatha	Telugu	Hemambharadhara Rao K.
Aayisha	Malayalam	Kunchacko
Anna	Malayalam	K. S. Sethumadhavan
Atom Bomb	Malayalam	P. Subramaniam
Ganga Ki Lahren	Hindi	Devi Sharma
Sangam	Hindi	Raj Kapoor
Althaara	Malayalam	P. Subramaniam
Aadya Kiranangal	Malayalam	P. Bhaskaran
Woh Kaun Thi?	Hindi	Raj Khosla
Devaalayam	Malayalam	S. Raamanathan
Charulata	Bangla	Satyajit Ray
Mr. X in Bombay	Hindi	Shantilal Soni
Yaadein	Hindi	Sunil Dutt
April Fool	Hindi	Subodh Mukherjee
Bireswar Vivekananda	Bangla	Madhu
Leader	Hindi	Ram Mukherjee
Ramadasu	Hindi	Chittoor Nagaiah
Jatugriha	Bangla	Tapan Sinha
Mangala Muhurta	Kannada	M. R. Vittal
Arunagirinathar	Tamil	T. R. Ramanna
Pachai Vilakku	Tamil	A. Bhimsingh
Prabhater Rang	Bangla	Ajoy Kar
Muriyada Mane	Kannada	Y. R. Swamy
Aathma Balam	Telugu	V. Madhusudhan Rao
Char Dervesh	Hindi	Homi Wadia
Vazhkai Vazhvatharke	Tamil	R. Krishnan, S. Panju
Kalai Kovil	Tamil	C. V. Sridhar
Swarga Hotey Biday	Bangla	Manju Dey
Prathigne	Kannada	B. S. Ranga
Veera Sankalpa	Kannada	Hunsur Krishnamurthy
Chandavalliya Thota	Kannada	T.V. Singh Thakore
Alli	Tamil	S. S. Rajendran
Sri Tirupatamma Katha	Telugu	B. S. Narayana
Marmayogi	Telugu	B. A. Subba Rao
Pathiye Daiva	Kannada	R. Nagendra Rao
School Master	Malayalam	Puttanna Kanagal
Bommai	Tamil	S. Balachander
Sadhana	Hindi, Odia	Prabhat Mukherjee
Pratinidhi	Bangla	Mrinal Sen
Mane Aliya	Kannada	S.K. Ananthachari
Dagudu Moothalu	Telugu	Adurthi Subba Rao
Aggi Pidugu	Telugu	B. Vittalacharya
Badshah	Hindi	Chandrakant Gaur
Vaarasatwam	Telugu	Tapi Chanakya
Sabhash Suri	Telugu	I. N. Murthy
Thozhilali	Tamil	M. A. Thirumugam
Aarohi	Bangla	Tapan Sinha
Naandi	Kannada	N. Lakshminarayan
Chinnada Gombe	Kannada	B. R. Panthulu
Chitralekha	Hindi	Kidar Sharma
Phoolon Ki Sej	Hindi	Inder Raj Anand
Geet Gaya Patharon Ne	Hindi	V. Shantaram
Oral Koodi Kallanayi	Malayalam	P. A. Thomas
Ramudu Bheemudu	Telugu	Tapi Chanakya
Omanakuttan	Malayalam	K. S. Sethumadhavan
Panakkara Kudumbam	Tamil	T. R. Ramanna
Manavatty	Malayalam	K. S. Sethumadhavan
Server Sundaram	Tamil, Telugu	R. Krishnan
Rajkumar	Hindi	K. Shankar
Kutti Kuppayam	Malayalam	M. Krishnan Nair
Jahan Ara	Hindi	Vinod Kumar
Gudi Gantalu	Telugu	V. Madhusudhan Rao
Mera Qasoor Kya Hai	Hindi	Krishnan–Panju
Navarathri	Tamil	A. P. Nagarajan
Navakoti Narayana	Kannada	S.K. Ananthachari
Kalanju Kittiya Thankam	Malayalam	Puttanna Kanagal
Pazhassi Raja	Malayalam	Kunchacko
Karutha Kai	Malayalam	M. Krishnan Nair
Kudumbini	Malayalam	J. Sasikumar
Sindoore Megh	Bangla	Sushil Ghosh
Gazal	Hindi	Madan, Ved
Kai Koduttha Dheivam	Tamil	K. S. Gopalakrishnan
Main Bhi Ladki Hoon	Hindi	A. C. Tirulokchandar
Kohra	Hindi	Biren Nag
Pooja Ke Phool	Hindi	A. Bhimsingh
Jagga	Punjabi	Jugal Kishore
Padagotti	Tamil	Tatineni Prakash Rao
Murali Krishna	Telugu	P. Pullaiah
Babruvahana	Telugu	Samudrala Raghavacharya
Thacholi Othenan	Malayalam	S.S. Rajan
Shabnam	Hindi	Aspi Irani
Nalvaravu	Tamil	Charle
Mooga Manasulu	Telugu	Adurthi Subba Rao
Post Master	Kannada	G. V. Iyer
Vettaikaaran	Tamil	M. A. Thirumugam
Door Ki Awaaz	Hindi	Devendra Goel
Daal Me Kaala	Hindi	Satyen Bose
Pooja phalam	Telugu	Bommireddy Narasimha Reddy
Ziddi	Hindi	Pramod Chakravorty
Muradan Muthu	Tamil	B. R. Panthulu
Thaayin Madiyil	Tamil	Adurthi Subba Rao
Door Gagan Ki Chhaon Mein	Hindi	Kishore Kumar
Beti Bete	Hindi	L. V. Prasad
Cha Cha Cha	Hindi	Chandrashekhar
Vazhi Piranthadu	Tamil	A. S. A. Sami
Suhagan	Hindi	K. S. Gopalakrishnan
Manchi Manishi	Telugu	Kotayya Pratyagatma
Dooj Ka Chand	Hindi	Nitin Bose
Aayiram Roobai	Tamil	K. S. Gopalakrishnan
Zindagi	Hindi	Ramanand Sagar
Ishaara	Hindi	K. Amarnath
Rishyasringar	Tamil	Mukkamala
Hamara Ghar	Hindi	Khwaja Ahmad Abbas
Pasamum Nesamum	Tamil	Dasari Yoganand
Shagoon	Hindi	Nazir
Shehnai	Hindi	S.D. Narang
Sanjh Aur Savera	Hindi	Hrishikesh Mukherjee
Awara Badal	Hindi	B. R. Ishara
Pratidhwani	Assamese	Bhupen Hazarika
Vivaha Bandham	Telugu	P. S. Ramakrishna Rao
Ek Tuku Chhonya Lage	Bangla	Kamal Majumdar
Shree Guruvayoorappan	Malayalam	S. Raamanathan
Kaise Kahoon	Hindi	Atma Ram
Pathlaag	Marathi	Raja Paranjape
Deivath Thirumagaal	Tamil	Sandow M. M. A. Chinnappa Thevar
Aao Pyar Karen	Hindi	R. K. Nayyar
Haqeeqat	Hindi	Chetan Anand
Benazir	Hindi	S. Khalil

== Kerala ==
On 1st January 2025, M. P. Parameswaran gave his formal consent to release a selection of his works under a free license, making them available to the public domain via Wikimedia Commons. A ceremony was held at his residence where the first batch of books marked for digitization to the Wikimedia community. The digitisation process was undertaken by the Sahya Digital Conservation Foundation, with representatives from the Kerala Sasthra Sahitya Parishad, the Wikimedians of Kerala User Group, and other volunteers in attendance.

== See also ==
- Public domain in India
- 2025 in public domain
- Copyright law of India
- 1964 in India
