= Lahanda, Bargarh =

Lahanda
- Village
- Location of Lahanda in Odisha, India Lahanda (India)
- Coordinates: 21.4503°N 83.8505°E
- Country: India
- State: Odisha
- District: Bargarh
- Named for: Lohanda
- Elevation: 1,972 m (6,470 ft)

Population (2011)
  - Total: 6,183

Languages
  - Official: Odia
  - Local: Sambalpuri
- Time zone: UTC+5:30 (IST)
- PIN: 768111
- Vehicle registration: OD-17
- Nearest city: Burla, Sambalpur, Bargarh, Belpahar
- Vidhan Sabha constituency: Attabira
- Lok Sabha constituency: Bargarh
- Website: www.lahandagp.odishapr.gov.in

Lahanda is a village in Odisha, India. It is located in the Attabira block of Bargarh district.

== History of the village ==
There is a story behind the naming of the village Lahanda. According to the villagers the village is named so because in this village there has been huge production of iron handas earlier which led to such naming.

== Educational institutions ==
The village has one primary school known as Lahanda Primary School Established well back in the year 1901. The village has also a high-school with the name Lahanda Government High School established in the year 1981. The village has no college for which students rely upon Saraswat Degree Mahavidyalaya, Godbhaga which is about 05 km away,Larambha College which is about 12 km away , Attabira College which is about 12 Km away and Panchayat College, Bargarh about 25 km away.

== Nearby places ==
Lahanda is boarded by Godbhaga at north as well as N.H-6 which run across the middle of the Godbhaga chowk at a distance of approximately 5 km from the center of the village hub, The mighty and famous earthen water reservoir and the life line of Odisha The Hirakud Dam situated at a distance of nearly 3 km at South, at the west side of the village Silat the neighbouring village share the border with Lahanda, and at the eastern side there is a very beautiful and picturesque hill famously known as Chandali Dungri, to the other side of it the educational hub of western Odisha Burla sits on, Paharsrigida, Larambha, Kadobahal, Kumelsingh. Lahanda village contains many localities or sub villages like Nileipali, Jogipali, Badmal, etc.

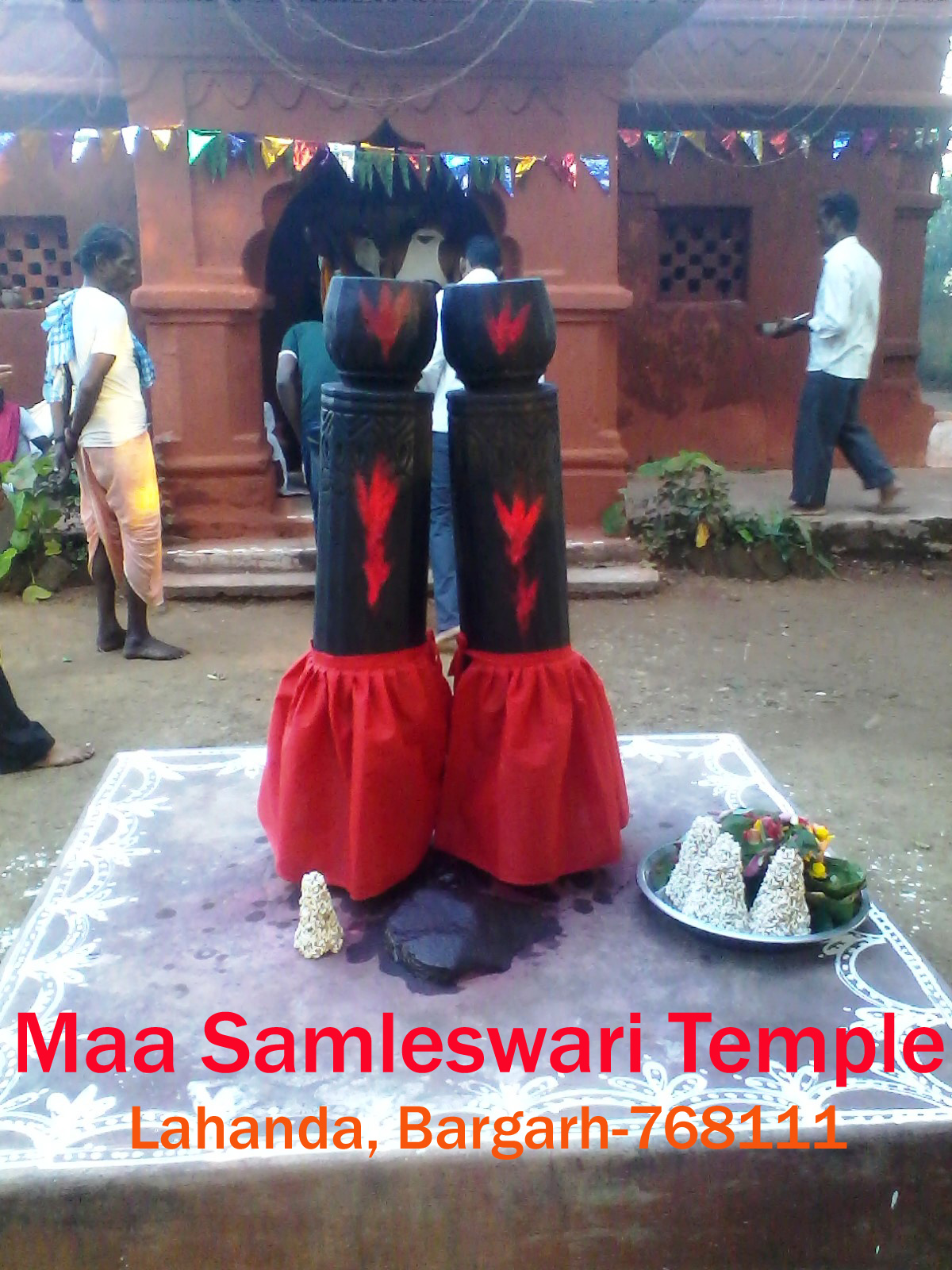

== Religious and cultural organizations ==
There are varieties of sociology-cultural and religious organization in the village. There are three clubs, namely Radhamadhab club, Jayadurga club and Kissan Jubak Sangh. One Sanskrutika kala parisad, one seva samabaya samiti, one GP Office, one animal wealth centre, one cooperative society, One UCO Bank 25 Swayansebak Gosthi (SHG), One R.I.office, 8 Anganwadi Centers are there for small kids and one post office in the village. The villagers have also organized the farmers group to develop their farming technique and to discuss on farmers problems of their area. The problems are solved by village meetings through village panchayats.

In the village there are four temples namely, Shri Shri Baba Vishwanath Temple, Jagannath Temple, Samaleswari Temple and Hanuman Temple. The village entry point is marked by a Samaleswari temple, established in the year 1939. A Jagannath temple stands tall in the middle of the village, which was established in the year 1929. Also a Mahadeva temple graces the village, established in the year 1926. Besides, other temples like Naga temple and Hanuman Temple enriches the worship atmosphere in the village. There are also three Bhagawat Tungi and Kirtan Mandali in the village.

Kirtan Party: Kirtan party is one of the oldest institutions in the area. The committees are primarily religious/ cultural in function and they take up the Kirtan/ Astha prahari where important local religious celebration where in nonstop religious chanting takes place for a specific period of time. The party consists of individuals who are interested in participating and who are good at singing or playing musical instruments. The chief singer co-ordinates the overall activity.

Temple committee: Temple committee is primarily responsible for temples, and temple land management. It consists of priests and elderly members of the village. There is no fixed tenure and a member continues according to his will. The temple has separate fund i.e. Kotha panthi (community fund) for management of temple. The flows to this fund are through individual house hold contributions, income from temple lands and contribution made by people to the deity.

== Fairs and festivals ==
The festivals may be broadly divided in to two categories, domestic and public festivals. The domestic festivals are confined to the worship of family deities. Public festivals are usually attended by a large number of people. Some of the important puja/festivals are Kumarotsava (Dashahara purnnima), Chaitra Purnima, Ratha Yatra, Bahuda Yatra, Hanuman Jayanti, Shivaratri, Bolbom, Holi, Dipawali. Besides in the month of April and May Chaubish Prahari Namayajna are observed by villagers with an elevated spirit and devotion.

Nuakhai: Nuakhai or ‘Nabarnna’ is the most important and popular festival of the area. Before the production of upland rice the people observe this festival in the bright fortnight of Bhadraba. They worship paddy in honour to their first production as agriculture is the main occupation of people. It is necessary to use flattened rice made of new paddy. On this day the village deity and goddess Laxmi are worshipped by offering Nua (mixture of new flattened rice, sugar and milk), then the Nua is distributed among all the family members in a special leaf called ‘Kurei Patar’. All of them accept Nabarnna having sat in a row in eastern direction. All members of family wear new clothes and enjoy the festival by taking cake and rice pudding.
