= Daughter of Sindbad =

- Directed by: Ratilal
- Starring: Nadira; Jairaj; Pran; Kamal Kapoor; S. N. Tripathi
- Music by: Chitragupta; Lyrics: Prem Dhawan; Anjum Jaipuri
- Release date: 1958
- Country: India
- Language: Hindi

Daughter of Sinbad or Sindbad ki Beti is a 1958 Indian Hindi-language film directed by Ratilal. It stars Nadira, Paidi Jairaj, Pran, Kamal Kapoor, S. N. Tripathi, Jeevankala. It had music by Chitragupta, with lyrics penned by Prem Dhawan and Anjum Jaipuri. It was produced by Starland Productions.

== Plot ==
As Sinbad the Sailor was returning home with a shipload of treasures, he vanished and was presumed to be lost in the wilderness. His daughter Shabnam (Nadira) set out to search for him, and when she reached the "Island of Halem Alah", she ran befoul of the island's King who was himself under control of his own Vizier. She and the king's heir fall in love as it develops that Sinbad was a captive of the Vizier. The Vizier had been torturing Sinbad to learn the secrets of his treasure.

== Cast ==
- Nadira
- Jairaj
- Pran
- Kamal Kapoor
- S. N. Tripathi
- M. H. Douglas
- Heera Sawant
- Jeevan Kala
- Maqbul
- Maruti

== Soundtrack ==
#	Title	Singer(s)	Duration
1	"Leher Chup Hain"	Mohammed Rafi, Usha Mangeshkar	
2	"Yeh Jaaneman Jaaneman"	Geeta Dutt	
3	"Jidhar Bulaye Jawan Nigahein"	Geeta Dutt	
4	"Dil De Baithe Jahan"	Geeta Dutt	
5	"Ek Dil Liya"	Mohammed Rafi, Geeta Dutt	
6	"Bheegi Bheegi Shaam"	Geeta Dutt	
7	"Suniye Suniye Fasana Humara"	Mohammed Rafi, Geeta Dutt	
8	"Yeh Dil Deewana Hua"	Geeta Dutt	
