= Abdul Hameed Khan (mayor) =

Indian politician (1892–1965)

- Born: 1892
- Died: 1965 (aged 70–71)
- Occupation: Politician
- Years active: 1927–1951

Abdul Hameed Khan (1892–1965) was an Indian merchant and politician who served as a member of the Madras Legislative Council, Madras Legislative Assembly and Diwan of the Carnatic state. In 1935–36, he served as the first Muslim mayor of Madras city. He lived in Amir Mahal in Chennai, India

== Early life ==
Hameed Khan was born in 1894 to Dhadha Khan, a rich merchant and philanthropist. His ancestors had migrated to Madras from Afghanistan generations ago.

== Political career ==
Hameed Khan entered politics by participating in the Khilafat Movement in Madras Presidency. In 1921, Hameed Khan, then a member of the Indian National Congress, quit the Congress to join the Swaraj Party and was elected to the Madras Legislative Council in 1927. He served in the council from 1927 to 1936 and was elected to the Madras Legislative Assembly in 1937 serving till 1951.

Hameed Khan served as Secretary of the Tamil Nadu Congress Committee, All India Congress Committee and the Madras Province Muslim League. In 1937, he broke away from the Indian National Congress to join the Muslim League and supported the Partition of India. Following India's independence in 1947, Hameed Khan returned to the Congress.

== As Diwan ==
Hameed Khan served as the Diwan of the Carnatic state. He was the editor-in-chief of the Deccan Times.

| Preceded by M. A. Muthiah Chettiar | Mayor of Madras; 1935–1936 | Succeeded by K. Sriramulu Naidu |
