= K. Sriramulu Naidu =

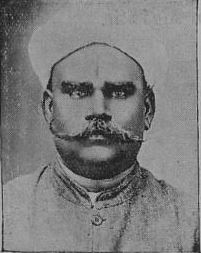
K. Sriramulu Naidu in 1920s

Kamalumpundi Sriramulu Naidu was a leader in the Justice Party, contemporary of Periyar and the first Mayor of Madras in the 1930s and 1940s, the capital of the Indian state of Tamil Nadu. He belonged to the Velama caste. His father was the chief translator of the Madras Presidency for the British and was knighted the Rao Bahadur by King George VI, for his service to the crown. He was a philanthropist who donated Kandappa Chetty Street, George Town, to the use for marriages and other auspicious functions, that is, for the marriages, collecting only lighting and utility charges. He also donated hundreds of acres of land to the government on which the Chennai International Airport is currently situated.

He was a great believer of God. As part of his belief, he donated No.13 Kandappa chetty street, shall out of the landed properties, be set apart for Kainkaryam of Sri Prasanna Seetharamanjaneya Sannadhi located at No.5 Thatha Muthiappan Street, George Town, Chennai.

Preceded by Abdul Hameed Khan	Mayor of Madras; 1936-1937	Succeeded by J. Shivashanmugam Pillai
