= The Tribal World of Verrier Elwin =

1964 autobiography by Verrier Elwin

- The Tribal World of Verrier Elwin book cover
- Author: Verrier Elwin
- Language: English
- Genre: Autobiography
- Publisher: Oxford University Press
- Publication date: May 1964
- Publication place: India
- Media type: Print
- ISBN: 978-0-19-562314-7
- OCLC: 1576037
- Dewey Decimal: 923.654
- LC Class: DS430 .E52 1964

The Tribal World of Verrier Elwin is an autobiography of anthropologist Verrier Elwin published by Oxford University Press. The book was published posthumously in May 1964, three months after the death of Elwin. It was awarded the Sahitya Akademi Award in 1965.

== Publication ==
Jonathan Cape and Hutchinson were interested in publishing Elwin's autobiography and had sent letters to Elwin but he decided to approach Oxford University Press. For book's title, Elwin requested his publisher R. E. Hawkins of Oxford University Press for suggestions and Hawkins put forward twenty-five different alternatives including Pilgrim's Way to NEFA, From Merton to Nongthymai, Khadi, Cassock, and Gown, Into the Forests, Over the Hills, Anthropologist at Large, Philanthropologist, No Tribal Myth, and My Passage to Tribal India. But they finalized the title The Tribal World of Verrier Elwin, "to make evident [Elwin's] primary loyalty and identification". The book was sent to press for the publication on 9 August 1963. When Elwin asked Hawkins for comments, Hawkins mentioned that the book does not reveal much about Elwin's personal life like "the struggle with Christianity, the rejection of civilization, the marriage to a tribal life, the final adoption of Indian citizenship." He wrote to Elwin that the Western readers "would like to know far more than you tell him here about the reasons which led you to take these steps, and the mental anguish that must have accompanied many of them".

However, Elwin died on 22 February 1964 at the age of 61, before his autobiography could be published. The book was published posthumously in May 1964.

== Awards ==
The autobiography was awarded the Sahitya Akademi Award in 1965. The citation for the award mentioned that the book is written "with sincerity, courage and charm, revealing a mind in which Western and Indian idealism were uniquely blended" and called it an "outstanding contribution to contemporary Indian writing in English".

== Reception and review ==
Indian historian and writer Ramachandra Guha mentioned that after reading two of Elwin's books, The Tribal World of Verrier Elwin and Leaves from the Jungle: Life in a Gond Village, inspired him to do Ph.D. in sociology. Poet and critic Nissim Ezekiel noted that the autobiography is written with "great charm and persuasion" and further mentioned that "[Elwin's] final position on all matters is made absolutely clear. There is not a single ambiguous sentence in [the book] and yet [no] dogmatic pronouncement in it". Kirkus Reviews mentions that "the descriptions of the Indian tribes are interesting enough, but the dose of home-spun personal philosophy is rather heavy". It was also noted that Elwin's personal life is not much discussed in the book and there are larger gaps in the narrative.

== Bibliography ==
- Guha, Ramachandra (30 October 2014). Savaging the Civilized: Verrier Elwin, His Tribals, and India. Penguin Books Limited. ISBN 978-81-8475-756-9.
- Guha, Ramachandra (2006). "Verrier Elwin". In Mehrotra, Arvind Krishna (ed.). An illustrated history of Indian literature in English. Orient Blackswan. p. 406. ISBN 978-8-178-24151-7.
