= Larambha =

Coordinates: 20°51′N 83°11′E

Larambha is a village in the Bargarh district in Odisha. India. It belongs to Attabira block. It consists of the hamlets of Larambha, Amastala, Karnatikra, and Garmuda. Its population is about 10,000. It is about 6 km from National Highway-6; State Highway-54 also touches the village. Cultivation is the main occupation of the people. It is irrigated by the Hirakud Dam.

== Education ==
Larambha is famous for its educational institutions. Larambha High School is one of the oldest high schools in undivided Sambalpur district. It was established in 1938 by the late Braja Mohan Panda. Initially it was a residential high school.

Larambha College (Braja Vihar) was established in 1964 by Mr B.M. Panda. It was started in the model of Shanti Niketan. Now it is a full-fledged college with Arts, Science and commerce streams.
