= Hira Singh Dard =

Sikh writer

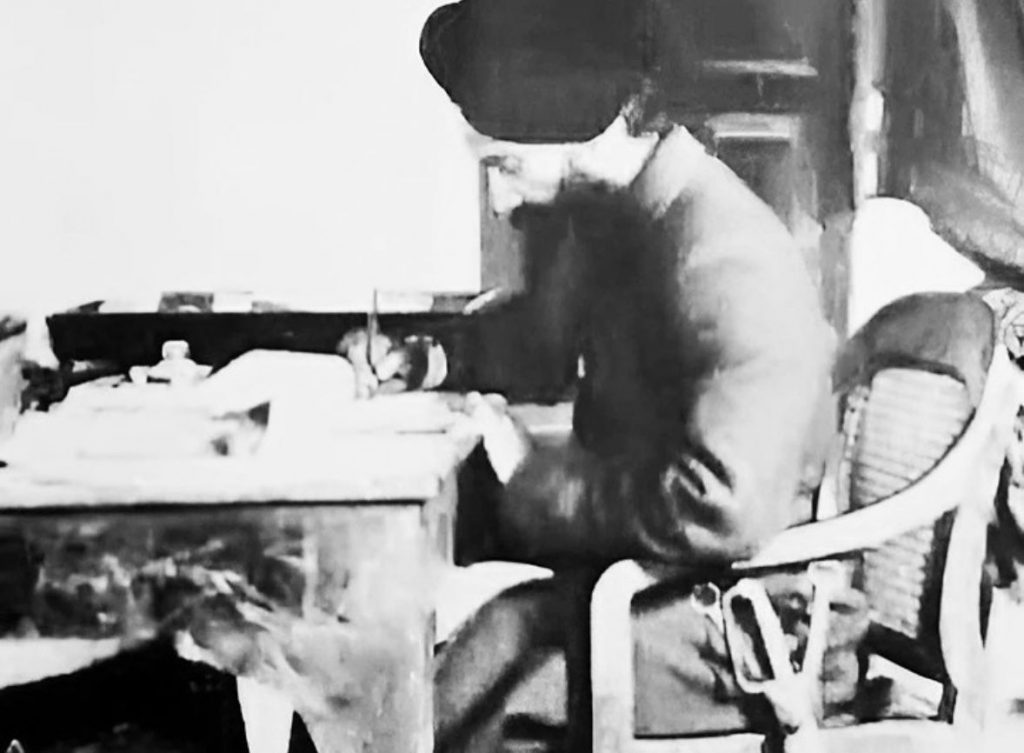
Photograph of Hira Singh Dard in his office, ca.1920

Giani Hira Singh Dard (30 September 1889 – 22 June 1965) was a Punjabi journalist and writer. He had begun to write religious and patriotic poetry in his early youth under the pseudonym of "Dard". He was among the founders of Kendri Punjabi Likhari Sabha (Central Punjabi Writers Association). Hira Singh Dard was a revolutionary and his writings depict his revolt against the social evils.

== Life and work ==
Giani Hira Singh Dard was born at village Ghaghrot (district Rawalpindi). His father's name was Bhai Hari Singh.

He was the founder and editor of Punjabi monthly magazine called phulwari launched in 1924 and was a prominent platform for academic and political debate in the Punjabi language during the colonial era. It was published from Amritsar (1924–1930) and then moved to Lahore until 1942. Following the Partition in 1947, Dard revived the magazine in Jalandhar.Under Dard’s editorship, Phulwari became a critical platform for anticolonial sentiment, often defending the cause of complete independence and swadesh (self-reliance).The magazine was known for its "Anks" (dedicated volumes) on specific themes.While early issues were rooted in Sikh reformism, Dard's later years—and the revived magazine post-1947—reflected his increasingly leftist and Marxist views.

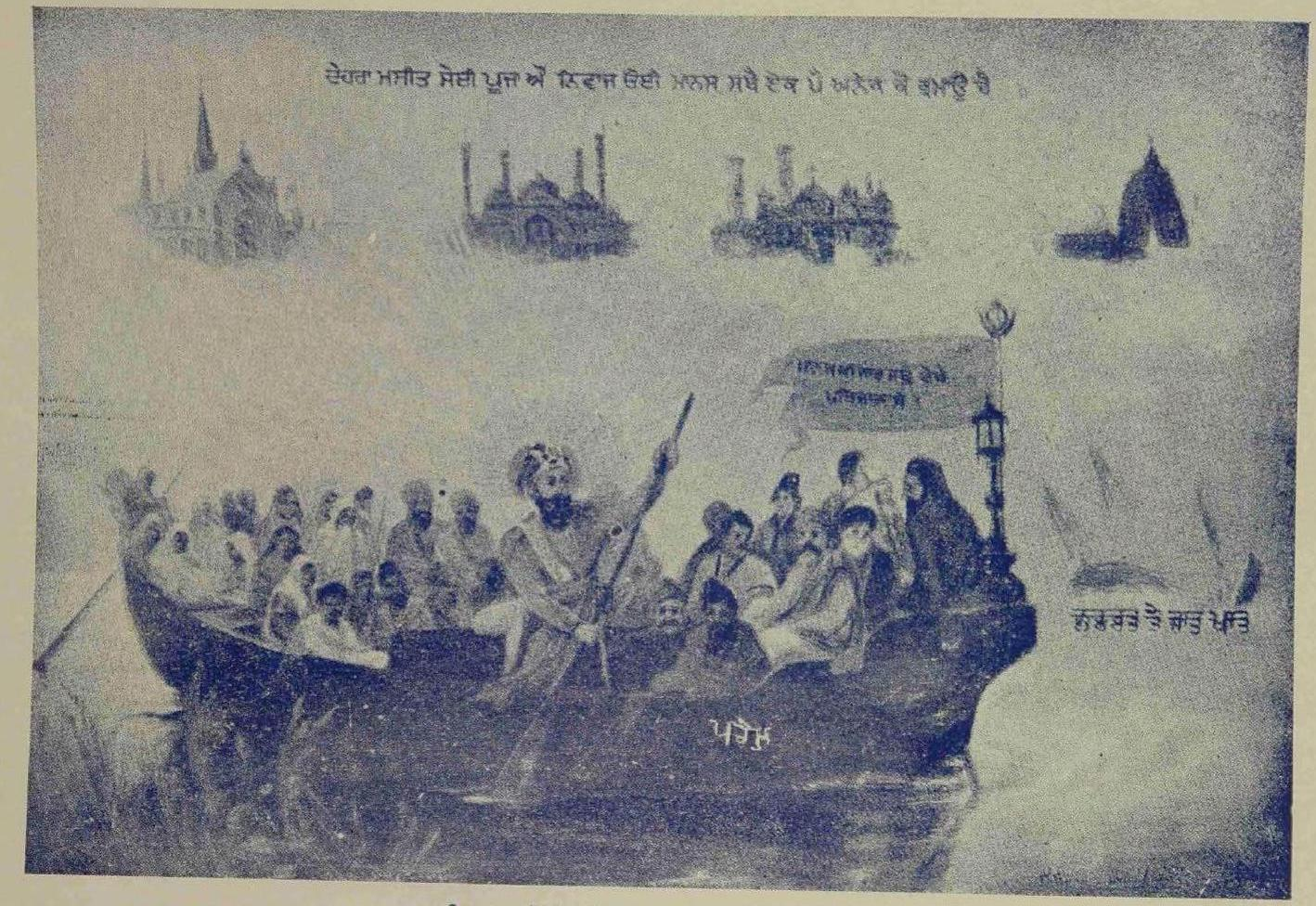
April 1928:Chhut Todak Ank,focused on the eradication of untouchability.

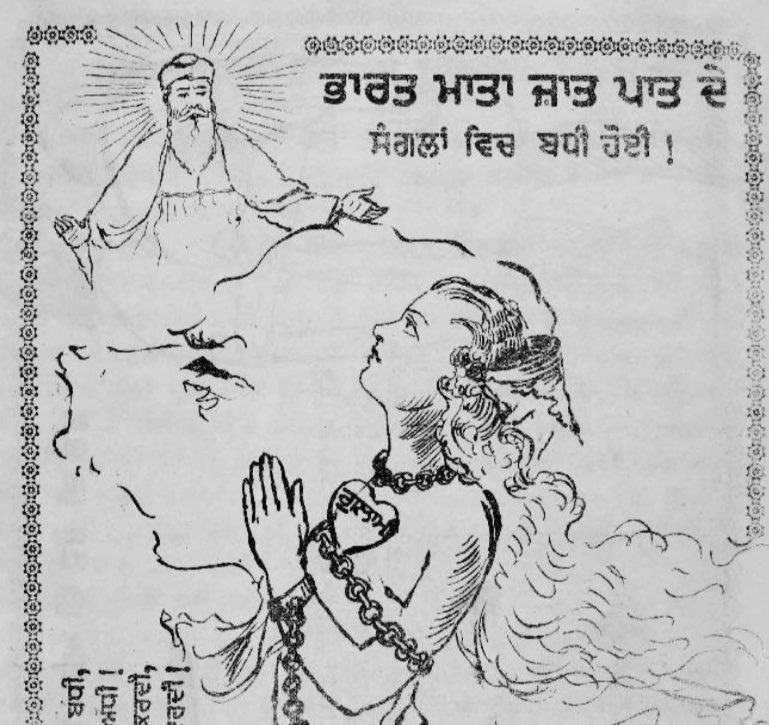
April 1928:Chhut Todak Ank

He also took part in the Gurdwara Reform Movement and was the assistant editor of the Akālī, Akhbar.

After the partition of the Punjab in 1947, he settled in Jalandhar (Punjab, India)

== Works ==
=== Poetry-Collections ===
- ਦਰਦ ਸੁਨੇਹੇ (In three parts)
- ਹੋਰ ਅਗੇਰੇ
- ਚੋਣਵੇਂ ਦਰਦ ਸੁਨੇਹੇ

=== Story-Collections ===
* ਪੰਜਾਬੀ ਸੱਧਰਾਂ (Punjabi Desires/Longings)

This is a collection of patriotic and socio-political poetry.It captures the "longings" of the Punjabi people for freedom from British colonial rule and emphasizes cultural pride and the need for communal harmony to achieve national independence.Written under his pseudonym "Dard" (meaning pain), the poems reflect the suffering of the masses under imperialist occupation.

=== * ਕਿਸਾਨ ਦੀਆਂ ਆਹੀਂ (The Sighs of the Peasant) ===
This work is a poignant reflection on the economic struggles of the farming community.It highlights the exploitation of farmers by both the colonial state and local moneylenders. Dard, influenced by Marxist ideology later in his life, used this work to voice the "sighs" (suffering) of the rural poor and advocate for land reforms and economic justice.It is considered a key piece of progressive Punjabi literature that shifted the focus from religious themes to class struggles.

=== * ਆਸ ਦੀ ਤੰਦ (The Thread of Hope) ===
Published in 1953, this is a collection of short stories (including the title story). The stories explore the resilience of the human spirit despite poverty and social upheaval. "The Thread of Hope" specifically deals with the aftermath of the Partition of Punjab, focusing on the hope for a better future and the rebuilding of lives in a new, independent India.Unlike his earlier revolutionary poetry, these stories provide a more intimate, psychological look at the lives of ordinary people.
