= Kadobahal =

Village in Bargarh, Odisha, India

Coordinates: 21°19′N 83°51′E

Kadobahal is a village in Attabira tehsil, Bargarh District, Odisha, India. This village is situated on a side of State Highway No. 54. The Jhaun rivulet, which is a tributary of the Mahanadi, flows on the west and south sides of it. Kadobahal is the panchayat headquarters of Kadobahal Grampanchayat, which comprises Kadobahal, Naikenpali, Barahamunda, Jhankabahal and Podbadi. https://naveenpatnaik.com/MLA-Ms-Snehangini-Chhuria-of-ATTABIRA-constituency-1363.html

== Facilities ==
As a rural area it has a well developed social infrastructure. There has been a government PHC since 1951/52. There is also a private nursing home which provides general surgical facilities. There are a primary school (Estd.- 1862), a High school (Estd.- 1965), a junior college and a private English medium school which provide basic educational facilities to local students.The British Indian government had established a girls' school near the weekly market yard of this village in 1919 but it was abolished after a few years of its establishment. Every Wednesday, a vegetable market and a cattle market is held in the RMC market yard premises. Long ago, this weekly market was considered to be the second or third biggest weekly market in Bargarh subdivision. There are a veterinary hospital, a cooperative society, a post office, a branch of state bank of India, a branch of Utķal bank, a canal supervisor's office and a revenue office on which people of nearby villages have to depend on.The Odia film director and playwright Late Bijaya Mahapatra once worked here as canal supervisor (junior Engineer).

== History ==
Once, Kadobahal was famous for the brass utensil work of Khaduras and wooden toys made by the Maharanas. The Maharanas of this village are entitled to repaint the idols of Jagannath temples in nearby districts and some temples of Chhattisgarh during the Anavasar period. Three weavers of this village, Daya Meher, Bishnubhakt Meher and Girigobardhan Meher, have received national awards for their skill in weaving Sambalpuri sarees. PatraNaresh

This village was founded by Chakradhar Dash in 1822. He was also the man who had built the biggest water reservoir(51 acres) in this village to facilitate irrigation. That water reservoir is named after him: the Chakar Kanta. There are also more than 13 small and medium size ponds for various purposes. The Dash family (Gauntia family—the founding family of Kadobahal), Acharya family, Patra family, Bhaena family, Satpathy family, Kahara family, and Teli family are the first inhabitants of Kadobahal. There was a Dumbal Para around the spot where the Krishnaguru temple stands now. But there is no Dumbal family now. There was also a crowded Sunari para, a street of goldsmiths where gold and silver ornaments were made. But only two families of goldsmiths are there now. Most of them have migrated elsewhere.

The chief deities of Kadobahal are Lord Madanmohan, Grampati, Demulien and Champadei. There is a legend behind the idol of Lord Madanmohan. The idol was discovered inside a Neem tree trunk while it was being cut down by the servants of Gauntia. Initially that idol was installed in a Kutcha temple and was worshipped as the chief village deity of Kadobahal. Later, in March 25, 1956, his descendant Haradhan Dash consecreted the present concrete temple. Haradhan Dash was also the promoter of the famous Gobardhan Puja, which was first observed here in 1938. His son Bipin Bihari Dash got the glory to be the first MLA of Attabira constituency. His nephew Bharat Kishore Dash was also fortunate to become the first chairman of Attabira panchayat samiti. There are many common temples dedicated to common Hindu gods and goddesses all over Bargarh district, but one can find a Saraswati temple only in Kadobahal. This temple is owned by the Kahara family of Kadobahal and it has been maintained by them for the last three generations. There is a Krushnaguru temple which is also supposed to be the first concrete temple dedicated to Krushnaguru in Bargarh region. There are also one Durga temple, one Hanuman temple, one Shiv temple, one Shakambhari temple and two Bhagavat temples in various parts of the village.

In 1932, during British rule, a freedom fighter from Kulunda, Attabira and some of his allies distributed pamphlets against British government in the crowded weekly Market of Kadobahal. After being informed of the incident the British sepoys rushed here and apprehended all of them and kept them for some hours inside the rooms of primary school and later released them.

The village was governed by the Gauntias on behalf of the British. To coordinate with the Gauntia administration there was an office of the British at the place where the panchayat office stands now. That office was called the Liaison Office (Dera kudia in the local language).

== Residents ==
Name of some villagers or family who have sacrificed their properties or wealth for the village welfare.

1. Late Motilal Padhan, padhiari family (extinct now) Patra family, Panigrahi family were the donor of the land on which High school, kadobahal college, Gyanodaya Public School stands.
2. The plot of land on which the Kadobahal Government Hospital is established was either acquired by government from some KHADURA family or donated by some KHADURA families.
3. The plot of land on which the veterinary hospital exists was either acquired by government from any DINGRA FAMILY or donated by any DINGRA FAMILY.
4. Gusein Dumbal (whose descendants have migrated elsewhere) has donated approximatedly one acre of land for the maintenance of Bhagbat Tungi of Udiapara.
5. Old people say that there were two ladies i.e. BALMATI DINGREN and PADHIARI BUDHI who were issueless had donated their agriculture land for the welfare of the village. However we have no legal record on this matter
6. DAUD MADRASI whose descendants are now living in Tamil Nadu had donated money for the construction of Agragami Yuvak Sangh building.
7. Satyavati Pandhren had donated an acre of land for the maintenance of Agragami yuvak Sangh.
