= M. H. Douglas =

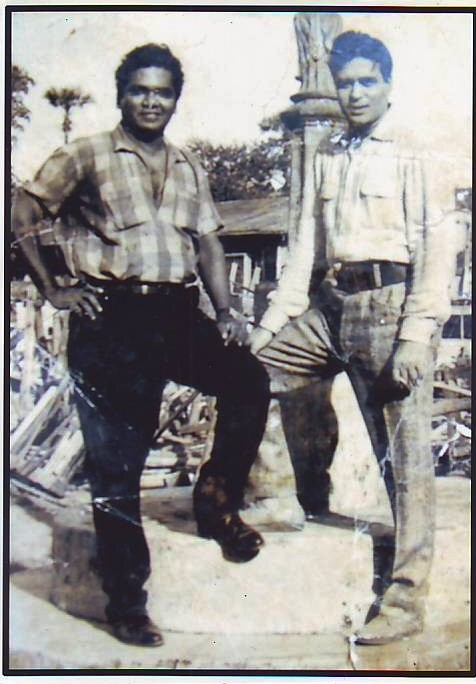
- M. H. Douglas (left) with Rajendra Kumar on the sets of Ayee Milan Ki Bela in 1963
- Born: Muhammad Hussain Khan; 2 October 1910; Hyderabad, Princely State Of Hyderabad
- Died: 30 March 1964; Bombay, Maharashtra, India
- Resting place: Disused Muslim Cemetery, Bombay, India (now in Mumbai, India)
- Other names: Douglas, Ustad, Fight Master Sando, Abba
- Occupations: Actor, action director
- Children: 3

M. H. Douglas (born Muhammad Hussain Khan) was an Indian actor, director, action director, and fight composer in the Hindi film industry. He choreographed fight and action scenes for many Bollywood hits. He is also one of the founding member of the Fight and Cine artist Association based in Mumbai.

As an actor, Douglas appeared in many silent films in the 1940s and 1950s.

== Early life and background ==
It is believed that Douglas was born to prominent Muslim parents in Hyderabad State, India, though his exact birth date remains unknown. His father, Nawab Kale Khan, was a Nawab in the Princely State Hyderabad. Little is known about his early childhood and family background. Douglas's father moved to Bombay before the Independence of India and the integration of the Princely State of Hyderabad into the Indian Union. Douglas grew up as Muhammad Hussain and used the stage name "M. H. Douglas" after entering the Hindi film industry. From a very young age, Douglas had a keen interest and was trained in Aerobics, Fencing, Swordsmanship, and Martial Arts.

== Career ==
Douglas started his career as a background actor in many silent movies. He appeared as a lead actor in several silent films most of which are now Lost films. Several attempts have been made to search those films in the Film archives.

== Death ==
On the afternoon of 30 March 1964, Douglas suffered a heart attack and died before reaching the hospital.

== Selected filmography ==
As an actor
Year	Film	Role	Director	Cast	Notes
1958	Daughter of Sindbad	Actor	Ratilal	Pran, Nadira	
1956	Samundari Daku	Actor	A.R. Zamindar	Nasir Khan, Nadira, Johnny Walker	
1956	Qismet	Actor	Nazir Ajmeri	Musarrat Nazir	Pakistani Film
1948	Diler Detective	Actor	Mohd. Hussain	Rajkumari Dubey	
1947	Sher-e-Bengal	Actor	Mohd. Hussain, Ranjibhai Arya	Rajkumari Dubey	
Unknown	Sher-e-Punjab (silent film)	Actor			

As a director
Year	Film	Role	Cast	Notes
1961	Aflatoon	Director	Krishna Kumari	Co-directed with Basu Bhattacharya

As a fight composer
Year	Film	Role	Director	Cast
1966	Alibaba Aur 40 Chor (1966 film)	Action Director	Homi Wadia	Sanjeev Kumar, L. Vijaylakshmi
1966	Phool Aur Patthar	Fight Composer	O. P. Ralhan	Dharmendra, Meena Kumari
1965	Bedaag	Action Coordinator: Fire Sequences	R. Bhattacharya	Manoj Kumar, Nanda
1965	आधी रात के बाद	Actions	[Nanabhai Bhat]	अशोक कुमार, रागिनी
1964	Ayee Milan Ki Bela	Fight Composer	Mohan Kumar	Rajendra Kumar, Saira Banu, Dharmendra
1964	Badshah	Action Director	Chandrakant Gaur	Dara Singh, Nishi
1964	Ek Sapera Ek Lutera	Fight Composer	Naresh Kumar (film director)	Feroz Khan, Kumkum
1964	Samson	Fight Composer		
1963	Cobra Girl	Fight Composer / Action Director		
1961	Teen Ustad	Stunt Director		
1960	Kohinoor	Action Director	S U Sunny	Dilip Kumar, Meena Kumari
1956	Sheikh Chilli	Stunt Coordinator	Ramchandra Thakur	Shyama, Mahipal
1955	Bara-Dari	Action Co-ordinator: Tipu Sultan Club		
1955	Teerandaz (1955 film)	Action Co-ordinator: Tipu Sultan Club		
1952	Aan	Fencing Fight Coordinator	Mehboob Khan	Dilip Kumar, Nimmi
1952	Saqi	Action	H. S. Rawail	Premnath, Madhubala
