= Verrier Elwin =

British-Indian anthropologist (1902–1964)

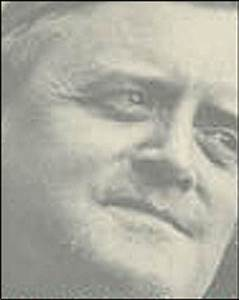
- Verrier Elwin
- Born: 29 August 1902; Dover, England, United Kingdom of Great Britain and Ireland
- Died: 22 February 1964 (aged 61); Delhi, NCT of Delhi, India
- Citizenship: United Kingdom (1902–1947); India (1947–1964)
- Education: Merton College, Oxford
- Occupations: anthropologist, ethnologist
- Known for: Study of Tribes of India
- Notable work: The Baiga (1939); The Muria and their Ghotul (1947)
- Spouse(s): Kaushalaya (Kosi), Lila.
- Awards: Padma Bhushan (1961)

Harry Verrier Holman Elwin (29 August 1902 – 22 February 1964) was a British-born Indian anthropologist, ethnologist and tribal activist. He is best known for his early work with the Baigas and Gonds of Orissa and Madhya Pradesh in central India. He later also worked on the tribals of several North East Indian states especially North-East Frontier Agency (NEFA).

Elwin served as the deputy director of the Anthropological Survey of India upon its formation in 1945. Prime Minister Jawaharlal Nehru later appointed Elwin as an adviser on tribal affairs for north-eastern India, and went on to become the Anthropological Adviser to the Government of NEFA. He was awarded the third highest civilian honour of the Padma Bhushan.

Elwin was a prolific researcher and writer. His autobiography, The Tribal World of Verrier Elwin, posthumously won him the 1965 Sahitya Akademi Award in English Language.

== Early life and education ==
Harry Verrier Holman Elwin was born on 29 August 1902 in Dover. He was the son of Edmund Henry Elwin, then the Anglican bishop of Sierra Leone. Harry was educated at Dean Close School and Merton College, Oxford, where he received his degrees of BA First Class in English Language and Literature, MA, and DSc. He also remained the President of Oxford Inter-Collegiate Christian Union (OICCU) in 1925. At Oxford, he also took a Double First in English and in Theology, before being ordained a priest in the Church of England.

== Career ==
In 1926 Elwin was appointed Vice-Principal of Wycliffe Hall, Oxford and in the following year he became a chaplain at Merton College, Oxford. However, at the age of 25, he went to India as a missionary to undertake humanitarian work. For this, he joined the Christa Seva Sangha (CSS), an austere missionary society of the Anglican Franciscans then headquartered in Poona. Historian Ramachandra Guha notes that the CSS hoped to 'indigenize' Christianity, with its members wearing khadi, eating vegetarian food, and devising a liturgy which incorporated elements of Indian music, art, and architecture.

Over the years, he was influenced by the philosophies of Mahatma Gandhi and Rabindranath Tagore. He quickly threw in his lot with the Congress, winning Gandhi's affection and becoming a camp follower and occasional cheerleader to the popular movement against British rule. Seeking fuller immersion in the toil, the sufferings, the poverty of India, he resolved to make his home among the Gonds. He first joined Christian Service Society in Pune. The first time he visited the central India, now the states of Madhya Pradesh, Chhattisgarh, and parts of eastern Maharashtra, was with an Indian from Pune, Shamrao Hivale. For the first time, he visited a remote village in the forests of Mandla district. Hivale and he were to spend some twenty years in Central India, living with and fighting for tribal rights. Their studies on the tribes are some of the earliest anthropological studies in the country. In 1954, he was appointed anthropological adviser to the Indian Government, with the special reference to the hill tribes of the north east. Moving to Shillong, he served for a decade as a leading missionary of what he liked to call 'Mr Nehru's Gospel for tribes'. He participated in the Indian independence movement, and in 1930 Gandhi said he regarded Elwin as a son.

He first abandoned the clergy, to work with Mahatma Gandhi and the Indian National Congress, then converted to Hinduism in 1935 after staying in a Gandhian ashram, and split with the nationalists over what he felt was an overhasty process of transformation and assimilation for the tribals. Verrier Elwin is best known for his early work with the Baigas and Gonds of Orissa and Madhya Pradesh in central India, and he married a 13 year old member of one of the communities he studied.

He came out with numerous works on various tribal groups in India, the best acclaimed being those on Maria and Baigas.

After India attained independence in 1947, he was asked by Nehru to find solutions to the problems that emerged among the tribal peoples living in the far northeastern corner of India, the North East Frontier Agency (NEFA). He was also a Fellow of the Indian National Science Academy.

In time he became an authority on Indian tribal lifestyle and culture, particularly on the Gondi people. He served as the deputy director of the Anthropological Survey of India upon its formation in 1945. Post-independence, he took up Indian citizenship. Prime Minister Jawaharlal Nehru appointed him as an adviser on tribal affairs for north-eastern India, and later he was Anthropological Adviser to the Government of NEFA (now Arunachal Pradesh. His philosophy towards the north-east was partially responsible in its disconnect from the modern world.

The Government of India awarded him the third highest civilian honour of the Padma Bhushan in 1961. His autobiography, The Tribal World of Verrier Elwin won him the 1965 Sahitya Akademi Award in English Language, given by the Sahitya Akademi, India's National Academy of Letters.

== On Ghotul ==
Verrier Elwin wrote – "The message of the ghotul – that youth must be served, that freedom and happiness are more to be treasured than any material gain, that friendliness and sympathy, hospitality and unity are of the first importance, and above all that human love – and its physical expression – is beautiful, clean and precious, is typically Indian."

== Personal life ==
On 4 April 1940 Elwin married Kaushalaya (Kosi) from the Gond tribe, living in Raythwar (Raithwar) village of present-day Dindori district in Madhya Pradesh, with whom he lived and worked. While he was 37 then, she was 13 years old. Within few months of their first meeting, Elwin proposed for marriage to her parents who refused due to existing tribe-based traditions. Elwin married Kosi under the Special Marriage Act, 1872 by what he called 'love marriage by capture.' The colonial law was aimed for inter-religious and inter-racial marriages. This was followed by a four-day Gond wedding. They had two sons, Jawahar Singh, born in 1941, and Vijay. Elwin had an ex-parte divorce in 1949, at the Calcutta High Court, writing in his autobiography, "I cannot even now look back on this period of my life without a deep sense of pain and failure"

Elwin remarried a woman called Lila, belonging to the Pardhan Gond tribe in nearby Patangarh, moving with her to Shillong in the early 1950s. They had three sons, Wasant, Nakul and Ashok. His marriage to Lila connected Verrier to Jangarh Singh Shyam, the Gond artist.

In January 1954, Elwin became the first foreigner to become an Indian citizen.

After a long illness, Elwin died in Delhi on 22 February 1964 after a heart attack. His widow Lila died in Mumbai in 2013, aged about 80, shortly after the demise of their eldest son, Wasant.

In 2006, Kosi was still living in a hut in Raythwar, their son Jawahar having died. Vijay, also died young.

== Legacy ==
Many of Elwin's books were subsidised and not profitable for publishers. In the late 1980s, his wife provided the North-Eastern Hill University with funds in his memory to encourage reading and revisiting his works. Bureaucrat Nari Rustomji compiled the first anthology of Elwin's writings to 'revive interest in one of the most outstanding champions of tribal people.' Verrier Elwin, Philanthropologist: Selected Writings, edited by Rustomji was jointly published by North-Eastern Hill University Publications and Oxford University Press in 1989. The latter had previously published many of Elwin's works. The historian Ramachandra Guha's biography Savaging the Civilized: Verrier Elwin, His Tribals, and India (1999) brought renewed attention in India to Elwin's life and career.

== Works ==
- Christian Dhyana. Society for Promoting Christian Knowledge, 1930.
- The Dawn of Indian Freedom, with Jack Copley Winslow. G. Allen & Unwin, 1931.
- Truth about India: can we get it?, G. Allen & Unwin, 1932.
- Mahatma Gandhi: sketches in pen, pencil and brush, with Kanu Desai. Golden Vista Press, 1932.
- Gandhi: the Dawn of Indian Freedom, with John Copley Winslow. Fleming H. Revell company, 1934.
- Songs of the Forest: the folk poetry of the Gonds, with Shamrao Hivale. London: G. Allen & Unwin, 1935.
- Leaves from the Jungle: Life in a Gond Village (first edition), John Murray Publishers Ltd, 1936.
- The Agaria, H. Milford, Oxford University Press, 1942.
- The Aboriginals. H. Milford, Oxford University Press, 1944.
- Folk-songs of the Maikal Hills, with Shamrao Hivale. H. Milford, Oxford University Press, 1944.
- Folk-songs of Chhattisgarh, G. Cumberlege, Oxford University Press, 1946.
- The Muria and their Ghotul, Oxford University Press, 1947.
- Myths of Middle India, Indian Branch, Oxford University Press, 1949.
- Bondo Highlander, Oxford University Press, 1950.
- Maria Murder and Suicide, Oxford University Press, 1950.
- The Tribal Art of Middle India: a personal record, Indian Branch, Oxford University Press, 1951.
- Tribal Myths of Orissa, Indian Branch, Oxford University Press, 1954.
- The Religion of an Indian Tribe, Oxford University Press, 1955.
- Leaves from the Jungle: Life in a Gond Village (second edition), Oxford University Press, 1958.
- Myths of the North-east Frontier of India, North-East Frontier Agency, 1958.
- India's North-east Frontier in the Nineteenth Century, Oxford University Press, 1959.
- The Art of the North-east Frontier of India, North-East Frontier Agency, 1959.
- A Philosophy for NEFA, Shillong, 1959.
- A Philosophy for NEFA. S. Roy on behalf of the North-East Frontier Agency (NEFA), 1960.
- When the World was Young: folk-tales from India's hills and forests. Publication Div., Ministry of Information & Broadcasting, Govt. of India, 1961.
- A New Deal for Tribal India. Abridgement of the tenth Report of the Commissioner for Scheduled Castes and Scheduled Tribes for the year 1960–61. Ministry of Home Affairs, 1963.
- The Tribal World of Verrier Elwin: An Autobiography. Oxford University Press, 1964.
- Religious and Cultural Aspects of Khadi. Sarvodaya Prachuralaya, 1964.
- Democracy in NEFA. North-East Frontier Agency, 1965.
- Folk Paintings of India. Inter-national Cultural Centre, 1967.
- The Kingdom of the Young, Oxford University Press, 1968.
- The Nagas in the Nineteenth Century, Oxford University Press, 1969.
- A New Book of Tribal Fiction. North-East Frontier Agency, 1970.
- Folk-tales of Mahakoshal. Arno Press, 1980. (including the tale The Fisher-Girl and the Crab)
- The Baiga. Gian Pub. House, 1986.
- Verrier Elwin, Philanthropologist: Selected Writings. Ed. Nari Rustomji. North-Eastern Hill Univ. Publications, and Oxford University Press, 1989, ISBN 0-19-565801-9.

== See also ==
- Christoph von Fürer-Haimendorf

== Sources ==
- Linebaugh, Peter (2008). The Magna Carta manifesto: liberties and commons for all. University of California Press. ISBN 978-0-520-24726-0.
