= Braja Mohan Panda =

Indian writer (1890–1965)

- Born: 1890; Larambha, Odisha, British India
- Died: 1965 (aged 74–75)
- Occupations: Educator, Poet, Philanthropist
- Era: 20th century
- Known for: Founder of Larambha High School and Larambha College
- Notable work: Contributions to Odia literature and rural education

Braja Mohan Panda (1890 in Larambha – 1965) was an Indian educator and poet.

== Early life ==
He was born in Larambha in the undivided district of Sambalpur, Odisha, in 1890.

Panda's father was a land owner. Returning to Larambha after graduating from Presidency College in Calcutta, Panda realised that his native area may not develop without education; this prompted him to start a high school in Larambha in 1938, donating his own land for the school site.

In 1964, Panda established Larambha College, working at both educational institutions until his death in 1965.
