= Jyotirmoy Ghosh =

Indian mathematician

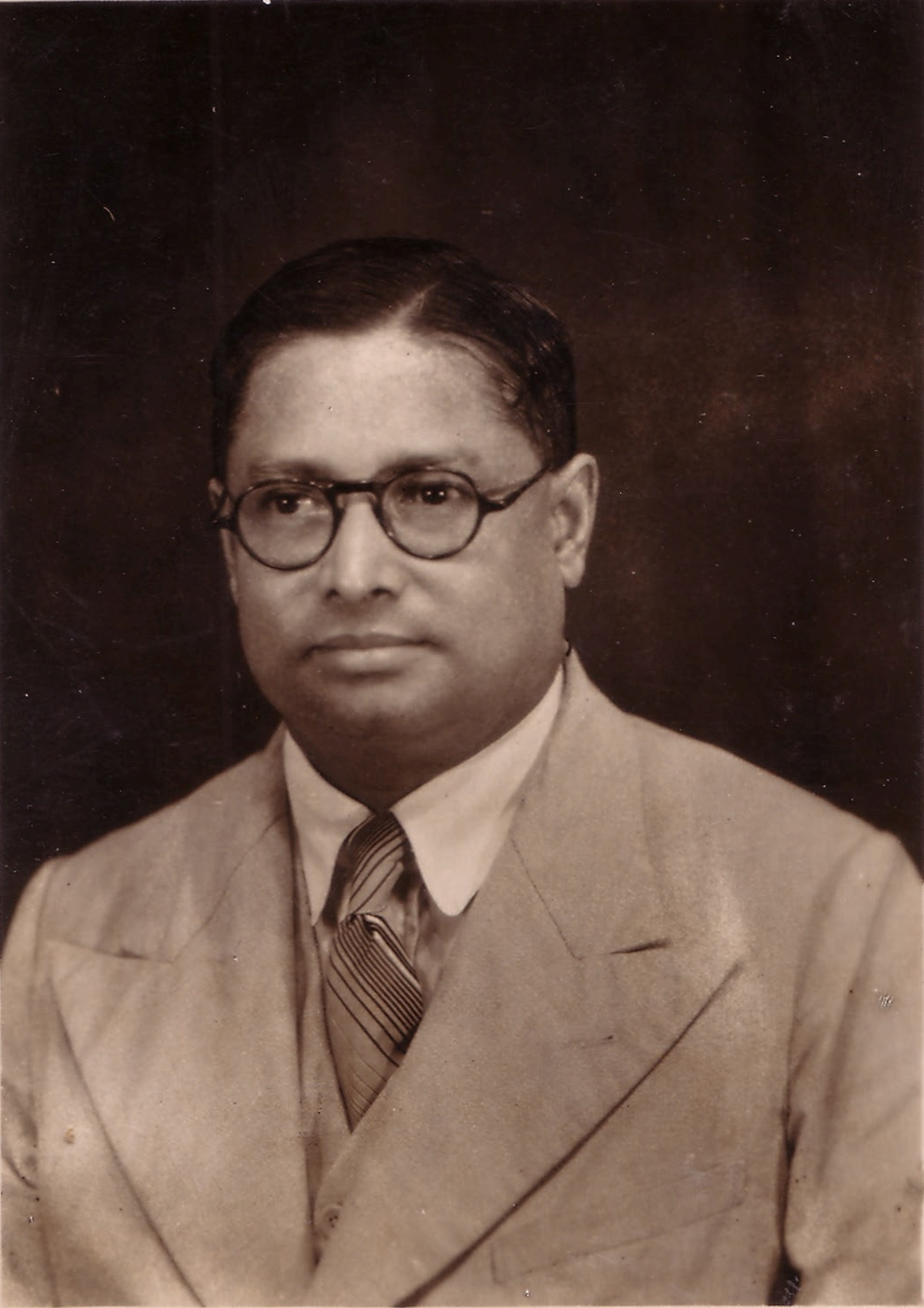
- Born: 1 January 1896; Ghasiara, India
- Died: 19 June 1965 (aged 69); Calcutta
- Other names: Jyotirmay Ghosh, Jyotirmaya Ghosh
- Education: Presidency College; The University of Edinburgh
- Awards: Fellow Indian National Science Academy; Fellow of the National Institute of Sciences of India; Life member of the Calcutta Mathematical Society
- Scientific career
- Workplaces: Presidency College, Calcutta

Jyotirmoy Ghosh (Jyotirmay, Jyotirmaya) (1896–1965) was an Indian mathematician, physicist, academic, writer, and a practitioner of homeopathic medicine. He frequently published non-academic works under the alias Bhaskar (Bhaskara, Baskar) Ghosh.

== Early life and education ==
Ghosh was born on January 1, 1896, in the village of Ghasiara (now in Sreepur Upazila, Bangladesh) in the Magura then-subdivision of Jessore District in India. He was the eldest of four children. Ghosh graduated (matriculated) from Narail Victorian Collegiate School in Jessore, India in 1912. In 1914, he earned his B.A. at Narail Victoria College, Jessore. In 1916, he earned a B.A. in mathematics at Presidency College, Calcutta. In 1918, he earned an M.A. in Applied Mathematics, coming in First Class Second. Following this, he traveled to the United Kingdom in 1925, and received his Ph.D. in mathematics at the University of Edinburgh, where he studied with Albert Einstein. Later, Ghosh was one of a few Indian physicists who corresponded with Einstein. His dissertation was entitled "On some problems in elasticity and on radially symmetric gravitational field in continuous matter".

== Career ==
Ghosh started his academic career as a professor of mathematics at the University of Dacca in 1921. Upon receiving his doctorate, he was appointed as a reader in Mathematics at the University of Dacca. In 1930, he founded the Indian Physico Mathematical Journal, and also served as its editor for several years. In 1930 and 1931, he served as Professor of Mathematics at Presidency College in Calcutta, and from 1939 to 1942, served as Senior Professor of Mathematics and officer-in-charge at the Astronomical Observatory. Following this appointment, he joined Presidency College as the Vice-Principal, and in 1943 assumed the position of Acting Principal. From 1944 to 1948, he was appointed as Principal at Hooghly Mohsin College in Chinsurah. In 1948, he was appointed as the Principal of Presidency College in Calcutta and in 1951, he retired and started practicing as a homeopath.

== Research ==
Ghosh authored several publications in mathematics, and over sixteen non-academic works under the alias Bhaskar (Bhaskara, Baskar) Ghosh. He also wrote Ganiter Bhitti and Banglay Ganit Siksa in his name, which were published by the University of Calcutta. His research was primarily focused on the case of strain in a gravitation sphere, problems of vibrations including the torsional vibrations of a tube, longitudinal vibrations of a hollow cylinder, and transverse vibrations of a thin rotating rod, and of a rotating circular ring.

Ghosh was one of the few Indian physicists who communicated with Albert Einstein. He sent Einstein a short paper discussing certain types of radially symmetric solutions of the new equations of gravitation, while highlighting Einstein's work published in the Mathematische Annalen. He worked over 6 years to solve the problem. Nature wrote that on June 2, 1935, it received a short letter from Ghosh "To make it intelligible to a wider range of readers it seems advisable to incorporate it with some reference to Einstein’s own work." The gravitational equations (R_{pq} - 1/2 g_{pq} R = -8 Π E_{pq}) originally proposed represent a law of conservation of momentum or mass and energy.

Ghosh has worked on the theory of elasticity and theory of relativity. He also obtained solutions of the gravitational equations for fluid mass in which the radial and transverse stresses are linearly related. He found that the solutions in these general forms included, as special cases, the solutions of Einstein, De Sitter and Schwarzschild.

== Awards and honors ==
Ghosh was a Fellow of Indian National Science Academy, and the National Institute of Sciences of India, a Life member of the Calcutta Mathematical Society, a Member of the Indian Physical Society, and the Indian Science News Association, and was also associated with the Board of Higher Studies, University of Calcutta.

== Selected works ==
- Banglay Ganit Siksa, essay on mathematics, 1937, Calcutta University Press
- Ganiter Bhitti, book on mathematics, 1942, Calcutta University Press
- Pub. Lekha, 1940 (short story collection)
- Mojleesh, 1941 (essay collection)
- Kathika (as Bhashkar Ghosh), 1942 (short story collection)
- Bhojhori (as Bhashkar Ghosh), 1952 (short story collection)
- Shikshar Katha, (as Bhaskar Ghosh),1954 (essay collection)
- Bhaskarer Shreshtha Byanga Galpa (as Bhaskar Ghosh ),1954 (short story collection)
- Banglar Ekti Extraordinary Jewel, 1954
- Bhagerathi, 1954 (poetry collection)
- Rule of Three (as Bhaskar Ghosh), 1955 (short story collection)
- Purnima (as Bhaskar Ghosh), 1955 (novel)
- Koler Goru (as Bhaskar Ghosh), 1956 (play)
- A German Word Book
- A French Word Book
- Matriculation Algebra

== Personal life ==
Ghosh died on June 19, 1965, in Calcutta.
