= Dhumketu (writer) =

Indian writer (1892–1965)

- Born: Gaurishankar Govardhanram Joshi; 12 December 1892; Virpur, Virpur State, British India
- Died: 11 March 1965 (aged 72)
- Occupations: Short story writer, novelist
- Spouse: Kashiben
- Writing career
- Pen name: Dhumketu
- Language: Gujarati
- Notable work: Post Office (1923)
- Notable awards: Ranjitram Suvarna Chandrak (1935; declined); Narmad Suvarna Chandrak (1949)

Gaurishankar Govardhanram Joshi (1892–1965), better known by his pen name Dhumketu, was an Indian Gujarati-language writer, who is considered one of the pioneers of the Gujarati short story. He published twenty-four collections of short stories, as well as thirty-two novels on social and historical subjects, and plays and travelogues. His writing is characterised by a dramatic style, romanticism and powerful depiction of human emotions.

== Early life ==
Gaurishankar was the third son of Govardhanram Joshi and was a Baj Khedawal Brahmin by birth. He was born on 12 December 1892 at Virpur, a place near Rajkot and Gondal (now in Gujarat, India). Gaurishankar served at Virpur School drawing a salary of four Rupees per month. During this period he was asked to read biographies, historical novels etc. before Khatijabibi, who was the wife of Ishan. This habit made Guarishankar take a deep interest in literature. He has also written famous English poems, chapters including The Letter which is still popular.

In 1908, he went to Bilkha, a place close to Junagadh. He married Kashiben, the daughter of Gaurishankar Bhatt. There was Nathuram Sharma's Ashram in Bilkha. It had a large library which helped him graduate with Sanskrit and English in 1920. He served as a clerk at Gondal in railway for a year. In 1923, he left the government job and went to Ahmedabad and started teaching at the private school run by Ambalal Sarabhai, father of Vikram Sarabhai. During this period his literary activities blossomed. His pen name Dhumketu (Nom – de – plume) became well known in Gujarati literature. He died on 11 March 1965.

== Works ==
He is considered one of the pioneers of the Gujarati short story. He wrote 492 short stories. A collection of his short stories with the title Tankha was published in 1926. The four volumes of Tankha are considered as a milestone in Gujarati literature. His writing is characterised by a poetic style, romanticism and powerful depiction of human emotions. Through his short story, he gave a new dimension of experience, created characters drawn from different status and professions of life; and introduced a variety of locales and psychological moods. His first short stories collection Tankha (Sparks) was published in 1926, followed by Tankha-2 (1928), Tankha-3 (1932) and Tankha-4 (1935). His other short stories collections include Avashesh (1932), Pradeep (1933), Mallika Ane Biji Vartao (1937),Tribheto (1938), Aakashdeep (1947), Parivesh (1949), Anamika (1949), Vanchhaya (1949), Pratibimba (1951), Vanrekha (1952), Jaldeep (1953), Vankunj (1954), Vanrenu (1956), Mangaldeep (1957), Chandrarekha (1959), Nikunj (1960), Sandhyarang (1961), Sandhyatej (1962), Vasantakunj (1964) and Chhello Jhabakaro (1964).

He wrote novels, drama, biographies, reflective essays, satires and books for adults and children. He published more than 250 books in the various fields. He wrote 29 historical and 7 social novels. His historical novels are grouped in two series namely Chalukya Yuga Granthavalis and Gupta Yuga Granthavalis. He has freely adapted Kanaiyalal Munshi's dramatic devices in his historical novels. His historical novels include Chauladevi (1940), Rajsanyasi (1942), Karnavati (1942), Rajkanya (1943), Vachinidevi (1945), Jaysinha Siddharaj: Barbarjishnu (1945), Jaysinha Siddharaj: Tribhuvan Khand (1947), Jaysinha Siddharaj: Avantinath (1948), Gurajareshwar Kumarpal (1948), Rajarshi Kumarpal (1950), Nayikadevi (1951), Rai Karan Ghelo (1952), Ajit Bhimdev (1953), Aamrapali (1954), Nagari Vaishali (1954), Magadhpati (1955), Mahaamatya Chanakya (1955), Chandragupta Maurya (1956), Samrat Chandragupta (1957), Priyadarshi Ashok (1958), Priyadarshi Samrat Ashok (1958), Magadhsenapati Pushpamitra (1959), Kumardevi (1960), Gurjarpati Moolrajdev: 1-2 (1961), Paradhin Gujarat (1962), Bharatsamrat Samudragupta: 1, 2 (1963, 1964), Dhruvdevi (1966). His social novels include Prutvish (1923), Rajmugat (1924), Rudrasharan (1937), Ajita (1939), Parajay (1939), Jivan Na Khander (1963) and Manzil Nahi Kinara (1964).

Kalikalsarvagnya Hemchandracharya (1940) is the biographical work written by him on the life of Hemachandra, a Jain scholar and poet. Jivanpanth and Jivanrang are two of his autobiographies which provided a vivid glimpse of his past life and an idea of how he became a writer.

== Recognition ==
In 1935, he was awarded Ranjitram Suvarna Chandrak, the highest award in Gujarati literature, which he refused to accept. He received Narmad Suvarna Chandrak for literary activities in 1949. He served as an adviser to the Sahitya Akademi, Delhi for Gujarati in 1957. He won the rare honour to represent India in a book published in the US with the title Stories From Many Lands. This was a collection of the best stories from sixty countries. His story The Letter (Originally published as Post Office) was included in it. Sahitya Akademi, Delhi published this story in Contemporary Indian Short Stories and Penguin Books published in The Best Loved Indian Stories of The Century (volume II).

== Bibliography ==
=== Historical novels ===
- Dhumketu (2016) [1954]. Aamrapali. Gupta Yuga Granthavali:1. Ahmedabad: Gurjar Granth Ratna Karyalaya. ISBN 978-93-5162-283-3.
- Dhumketu (2016) [1954]. Nagari Vaishali. Gupta Yuga Granthavali:2. Ahmedabad: Gurjar Granth Ratna Karyalaya. ISBN 978-93-5162-284-0. OCLC 22662239.
- Dhumketu (2016) [1955]. Magadhapati. Gupta Yuga Granthavali:3. Ahmedabad: Gurjar Granth Ratna Karyalaya. ISBN 978-93-5162-285-7. OCLC 22662256.
- Dhumketu (2016) [1955]. Mahaamatya Chanakya. Gupta Yuga Granthavali:4. Ahmedabad: Gurjar Granth Ratna Karyalaya. ISBN 978-93-5162-286-4. OCLC 22662233.
- Dhumketu (2016) [1956]. Chandragupta Maurya. Gupta Yuga Granthavali:5. Ahmedabad: Gurjar Prakashan. ISBN 978-93-5162-295-6. OCLC 22662226.
- Dhumketu (2016) [1958]. Priyadarshi Samrat Ashok. Gupta Yuga Granthavali:8. Ahmedabad: Gurjar Granth Ratna Karyalaya. ISBN 978-93-5162-289-5. OCLC 9080792.
- Dhumketu (2016) [1959]. Magadhsenapati Pushyamitra. Gupta Yuga Granthavali:9. Ahmedabad: Gurjar Granth Ratna Karyalaya. ISBN 978-93-5162-290-1. OCLC 22453001.
- Dhumketu (2016) [1960]. Kumardevi. Gupta Yuga Granthavali:10. Ahmedabad: Gurjar Prakashan. ISBN 978-93-5162-291-8.
- Dhumketu (2016) [1963]. Bharat Samrat Samudragupta - 1. Gupta Yuga Granthavali:11. Ahmedabad: Gurjar Granth Ratna Karyalaya. ISBN 978-93-5162-292-5.
- Dhumketu (2016) [1964]. Bharat Samrat Samudragupta - 2. Gupta Yuga Granthavali:12. Ahmedabad: Gurjar Granth Ratna Karyalaya. ISBN 978-93-5162-293-2.
- Dhumketu (2016) [1966]. Dhruvdevi. Gupta Yuga Granthavali:13. Ahmedabad: Gurjar Prakashan. ISBN 978-93-5162-294-9. OCLC 279263294.
- Dhumketu (2016) [1945]. Vachinidevi. Ahmedabad: Gurjar Granth Ratna Karyalaya. ISBN 978-93-5162-212-3. OCLC 38033786.
- Dhumketu (2016) [1940]. Chauladevi. Ahmedabad: Gurjar Granth Ratna Karyalaya. ISBN 978-93-5162-270-3. OCLC 56533987.
- Dhumketu (2015) [1942]. Rajsanyasi. Ahmedabad: Gurjar Granth Ratna Karyalaya. ISBN 978-93-5162-214-7.
- Dhumketu (2015) [1942]. Karnavati. Ahmedabad: Gurjar Granth Ratna Karyalaya. ISBN 978-93-5162-215-4. OCLC 7945605.
- Dhumketu (2016) [1943]. Rajkanya. Chaulukya Yuga Granthavali:6. Ahmedabad: Gurjar Granth Ratna Karyalaya. ISBN 978-93-5162-275-8.
- Dhumketu (2015) [1945]. Barbarak-jishnu Jaysinha Siddharaj. Ahmedabad: Gurjar Granth Ratna Karyalaya. ISBN 978-93-5162-276-5. OCLC 28293586.
- Dhumketu (2015) [1947]. Jaysinh Siddharaj: Tribhuvankhand. Ahmedabad: Gurjar Prakashan. ISBN 978-93-5162-277-2.
- Dhumketu (2015) [1948]. Avantinath Jaysinha Siddharaj. Ahmedabad: Gurjar Granth Ratna Karyalaya. ISBN 978-93-5162-278-9. OCLC 85479661.
- Dhumketu (2015) [1948]. Gurjareshwar Kumarpal. Ahmedabad: Gurjar Granth Ratna Karyalaya. ISBN 978-93-5162-279-6. OCLC 56533988.
- Dhumketu (2016) [1950]. Rajarshi Kumarpal. Ahmedabad: Gurjar Granth Ratna Karyalaya. ISBN 978-93-5162-280-2.
- Dhumketu (2015) [1951]. Nayikadevi. Ahmedabad: Gurjar Granth Ratna Karyalaya. ISBN 978-93-5162-281-9. OCLC 225497714.
- Dhumketu (2015) [1952]. Rai Karan Ghelo. Ahmedabad: Gurjar Granth Ratna Karyalaya. ISBN 978-93-5162-282-6. OCLC 28293579.
- Dhumketu (2016) [1953]. Ajit Bhimdev. Ahmedabad: Gurjar Granth Ratna Karyalaya.
- Dhumketu (2016) [1957]. Samrat Chandragupta. Ahmedabad: Gurjar Granth Ratna Karyalaya. ISBN 978-93-5162-287-1. OCLC 22662215.
- Dhumketu (2016) [1961]. Gurjarpati Moolrajdev - 1. Ahmedabad: Gurjar Granth Ratna Karyalaya. ISBN 978-93-5162-210-9.
- Dhumketu (2016) [1961]. Gurjarpati Moolrajdev - 2. Ahmedabad: Gurjar Granth Ratna Karyalaya. ISBN 978-93-5162-211-6.
- Dhumketu (2016) [1962]. Paradhin Gujarat. Ahmedabad: Gurjar Granth Ratna Karyalaya. ISBN 978-93-5162-209-3. OCLC 23538240.

== See also ==
- List of Gujarati-language writers
