= Nawal Kishore Dhawal =

Indian poet, writer and journalist (1911–1964)

- Born: 11 November 1911; Sasorh, Sarmera, Nalanda, Bihar
- Died: 17 April 1964 (aged 52); Arrah, Bhojpur, Bihar
- Resting place: Patna
- Occupations: Poet; Writer; Journalist; Editor; Freedom Fighter
- Spouse: Ladli Devi Ambastha
- Writing career
- Language: Hindi, English

Nawal Kishore Dhawal was born on 11 November 1911 in Sasorh village, Sarmera, in Nalanda district, Bihar. He was raised in Munger (formerly Monghyr). Dhawal was well educated, with a strong grounding in literature, politics, and social reform-qualities that shaped both his activism and literary output.

Participation in the Indian Freedom Struggle

Dhawal joined the Indian independence movement in 1932, and was an active member of the Congress Socialist Party. He was jailed ten times by British authorities for participating in protests, satyagrahas, and peasant mobilizations.

In 1936, he helped organize the District Kisan Conference in Munger and led 300 satyagrahis in a symbolic protest march to block the gate of the District Magistrate's office. This act of defiance was one of many that underscored his commitment to India's liberation.

Literary and Editorial Contributions A renowned figure in Hindi literature, Dhawal worked as a writer, poet, editor, critic, journalist, and proofreader. He served as a Literature Officer in the Song and Drama Section of the Public Relations Department, Government of Bihar, where he continued to write and promote cultural education through drama and literature.

Between 1946 and 1952, he edited several influential Hindi periodicals from Jamalpur, Munger, including:

Arunodaya (Weekly)

Veer Balak (Monthly)

Mashal (Weekly)

Kar Aur Vyaapar (Monthly)

Chetavani (Weekly)

Aadmi (Weekly)

He also served as editor of a prominent Hindi newspaper published in Monghyr.where he voiced opinions on social justice, independence, and postcolonial development.

== Spouse ==
Ladli Devi, the wife of Nawal Kishore Dhawal, was herself a formidable figure. A committed freedom fighter and political leader, she actively participated in the independence struggle and later became involved in the political sphere during the early formation of the Bharatiya Janata Party (BJP). She was also a key participant in the Jai Prakash Narayan-led movement in Bihar, advocating for democratic reforms.

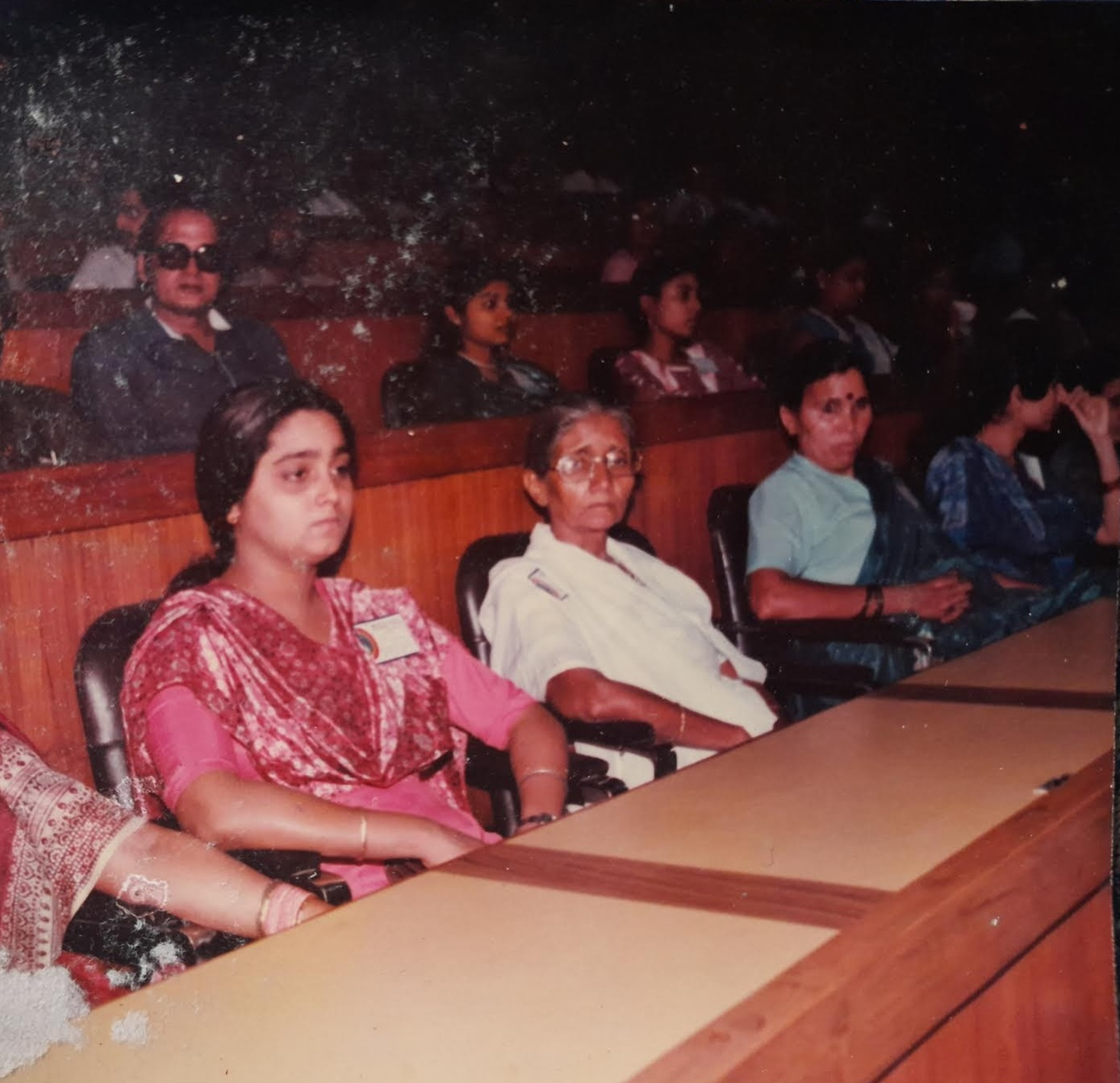
Ladli Devi

In 2017, on the 100-year anniversary of the Champaran Satyagraha, she was honored for her contributions to the freedom struggle. As part of the centennial commemorations, she received a special award from the District Magistrate, recognizing her lifelong service and sacrifices during India's fight for independence.

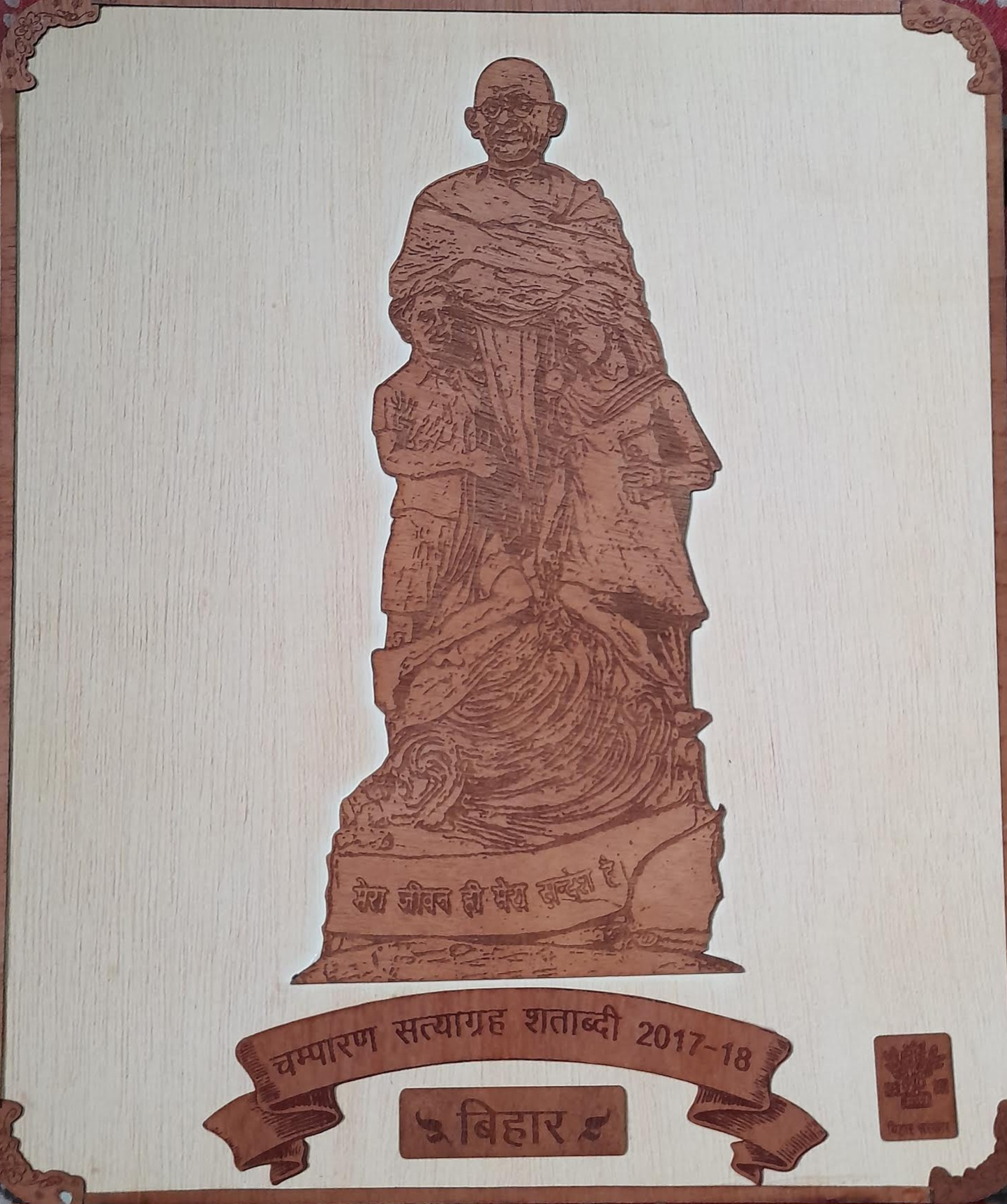
Champaran Satyagraha Award 2017

== Political Views and Legacy ==
Dhawal initially advocated cooperation with Panchayati Raj institutions based on Dr. Rajendra Prasad's vision, but over time he leaned toward direct mass action. His politics reflected a blend of socialist ideals, democratic values, and commitment to rural empowerment.

== Death ==
Nawal Kishore Dhawal died on 17 April 1964, at the age of 52, while delivering a stage speech in Arrah, Bhojpur district, Bihar. His sudden death in public service underscored his lifelong dedication to social and cultural causes.

== Children and Legacy ==
Nawal Kishore Dhawal and Ladli Devi had a large family, many of whom carried forward their legacy of public service, literature, and activism:

Sons:

Late Dr. Kumar Indubhushan Nehru – Resided in Bhagalpur, Bihar. He was the editor of Priyalok Samachaar, recipient of the President's Award (twice) and the Sahitya Akademi Award.

Prabhat Kumar Desai

Nishikant Patwardhan

Arun Kumar Mehta

Rajani Ranjan

Mrigendra Kumar

Daughters:

Late Usha Gandhi Chandraprabha Naidu

Mrinalini Chattopadhyay

Sharad Sharvari Rani

Many members of the family are based in Kankarbagh, Patna, and continue to be active in social and cultural initiatives.

== Legacy ==
Dhawal is remembered as a prominent figure in Bihar's political and literary history-a man who bridged the worlds of resistance literature, grassroots journalism, and freedom struggle. Together with his wife Ladli Devi, he helped shape the intellectual and political fabric of modern Bihar. His writings and activism remain a lasting tribute to the power of words in service justice and nation-building.

== Works ==
- Baandh Aur Dhara (drama)
- Vibhishan Ka Beta (drama)
- Mann ka Pher (drama)
- Ek Baat Ghar Haat Ka (Poetry)
