= Andhra Kavula Charitramu =

Biographical anthology of Telugu poets compiled by Kandukuri Veeresalingam

Andhra Kavula Charitramu (Telugu: ఆంధ్ర కవుల చరిత్రము; meaning Chronicle of Telugu Poets) is a compilation of the life histories of Telugu poets by Kandukuri Veeresalingam (1848-1919). It was published in three parts by Hitakarini Samajam, Rajahmundry. It is a history of Telugu literature, though the author dealt more with the lives of the poets than their poetry.

The first part has details of about 40 biographies of Telugu poets of Early period starting from Nannayya, adikavi (first poet) of Telugu language. It was dedicated to Sri Rajah Rao Venkata Kumara Mahipati Surya Rau Bahadur, Maharajah of Pithapuram. The author himself wrote in his Sweeyacharitramu (autobiography) that the first part was published by himself in 1897. It was published in 1917 again. After his death, it was published in 1937 and 1949.

The second part consists of about 60 biographies of Telugu poets of Middle period starting from Krishnadevaraya. It was published in 1940.

The third part enumerated short profiles of about 140 Telugu poets of Modern period starting from Haribhattu.
