= Durga Mohan Bhattacharyya =

Sanskrit scholar from India

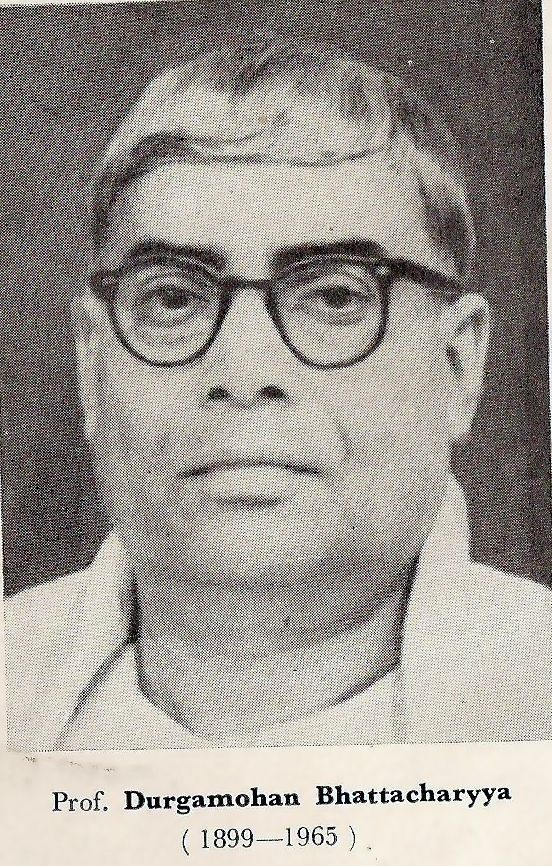
- Born: 13 October 1899; Dhaka, Bengal Presidency, British India (present-day Bangladesh)
- Died: 12 November 1965 (aged 66); Kolkata, West Bengal, India
- Occupations: Writer, Reformer, Professor
- Known for: Paippalāda-Saṃhitā
- Spouse: Bhavani Bhattacharya
- Children: Sukumar Bhattacharya; Lila Chakraborty; Amalendu Bhattacharya; Chhaya Chakraborty; Bani Chakraborty; Dipak Bhatacharya; Dilip Bhattacharya

Durga Mohan Bhattacharyya was an Indian scholar of Sanskrit. He had served as a professor of Sanskrit at the Scottish Church College in Calcutta.

He was a key figure in reviving many manuscripts of the Paippalāda-Saṃhitā and its ancillary literature like the Āṅgirasakalpa after painstaking search over years in Orissa and south-west Bengal. Durgamohan Bhattacharyya’s discovery of a living tradition of the Paippalāda-Saṃhitā, unknown until then, was hailed in the Indological world as epoch making. Ludwig Alsdorf went so far as to say that it was the greatest event in Indology. Bhattacharyya died in 1965 leaving his edition of the text incomplete. This task was completed by his son Dipak, whose critical edition of the first 18 kāṇḍas was published by the Asiatic Society, Calcutta came out in three volumes in 1997, 2008 and 2011.

== Early life ==
In the early 1900 he with other members of his family, migrated to Sahanagar, Lalbag in the district of Murshidabad. The family was poor and could not send its young children to an English medium school. His early education was derived from tols and chatuspathis, where the main subjects taught were Bengali and Sanskrit, the medium of education primarily being Bengali. Durgamohan was an exceptionally brilliant student and by the year 1915 he had appeared at several Sanskrit Upadhi examinations and topped the list of candidates for the several examinations on Sanskrit conducted by the Government of Bengal. He acquired the highest degrees in Kavya, Sankhya and Purana and got the title of Bhagavataratna.

Durgamohan with his widowed mother (Sarada) and only younger brother moved to his maternal uncle's house in Calcutta. Coming to know about the keen desire of Durgamohan to study English, his senior maternal uncle took him to Suresh Chandra Kundu, then the headmaster of Town School, Calcutta, an institution of great reputation. It was an immense task for Durgamohan to achieve as he had already reached the age of 16 and he was required to complete the normal course of ten years in a single year. He successfully completed the task and in 1917 he sat for the Entrance Examination of the University of Calcutta and was declared successful, obtaining a place in the First Division of successful candidates.

The Intermediate Examination (F.A.) was achieved in 1919 at the Vidyasagar College, the B.A. Examination with a First Class honours Degree in Sanskrit from the Scottish Church College was gained in 1921 and the master's degree in Sanskrit was obtained in 1923 from the University of Calcutta.

== Career ==
=== Early career ===
After completing his studies in the University, Durgamohan decided to take up the educational line as his field of activities. Having served as a Professor of Sanskrit in the Narasinha Dutt College of Howrah for some time, he joined the Scottish Church College as a professor of Sanskrit and Bengali and eventually became the head of the department of Sanskrit in the early thirties. In 1952 he was inducted in the West Bengal Senior Educational Service as Professor of Vedic Language, Literature and Culture in the Postgraduate Training and Research Department of the Sanskrit College, which position he occupied till the date of his death.

He used to be invited by learned societies like the Asiatic Society of Bengal, the Asiatic Society of Bombay, the Bhandarkar Oriental Research Institute, and others to deliver talks on specific topics particularly the Vedas. He was awarded gold medals by the Asiatic Societies for his services in the field of Sanskrit.

=== Work on Paippalāda-Saṃhitā ===
He had come to infer from many sources that of the four Vedas, the Atharva Veda and its practice had not become extinct in India as many scholars of repute used to hold and propagate. To prove his conviction in this regard he visited a large number of places all over India, and, ultimately a few years before his death, he was able to locate a place in Orissa, Guhiapal to be precise where he found the Atharva Veda to be actively practiced and there he discovered several Oriya manuscripts in which the Paippalāda-Saṃhitā, one of the nine versions of the Atharva Veda was faithfully reproduced. The discovery was made known to the world and the belief about the extinction of the practice of Atharva Veda was proved incorrect. He was hailed for his painstaking effort and perseverance in the unearthing of the Paippalāda-Saṃhitā as an epoch making discovery.

He started serious work on the Paippalāda-Saṃhitā, and publications also started which received acclamations from scholars all over the world. But unfortunately Durgamohan fell ill with cancer and died on 12 November 1965. His task was completed by his son Dipak Bhattacharya whose critical edition of the first 18 kāṇḍas published by the Asiatic Society, Calcutta came out in three volumes in 1997, 2008 and 2011.

(Input source Mrs Lila Chakraborty, Mr Joy Bhattacharya)

== Personal life ==
Durgamohan had five sons and four daughters. His wife Bhavani Bhattacharya died in 1992.
