= Post Office (short story) =

Short story by Dhumketu

- Short story by Dhumketu
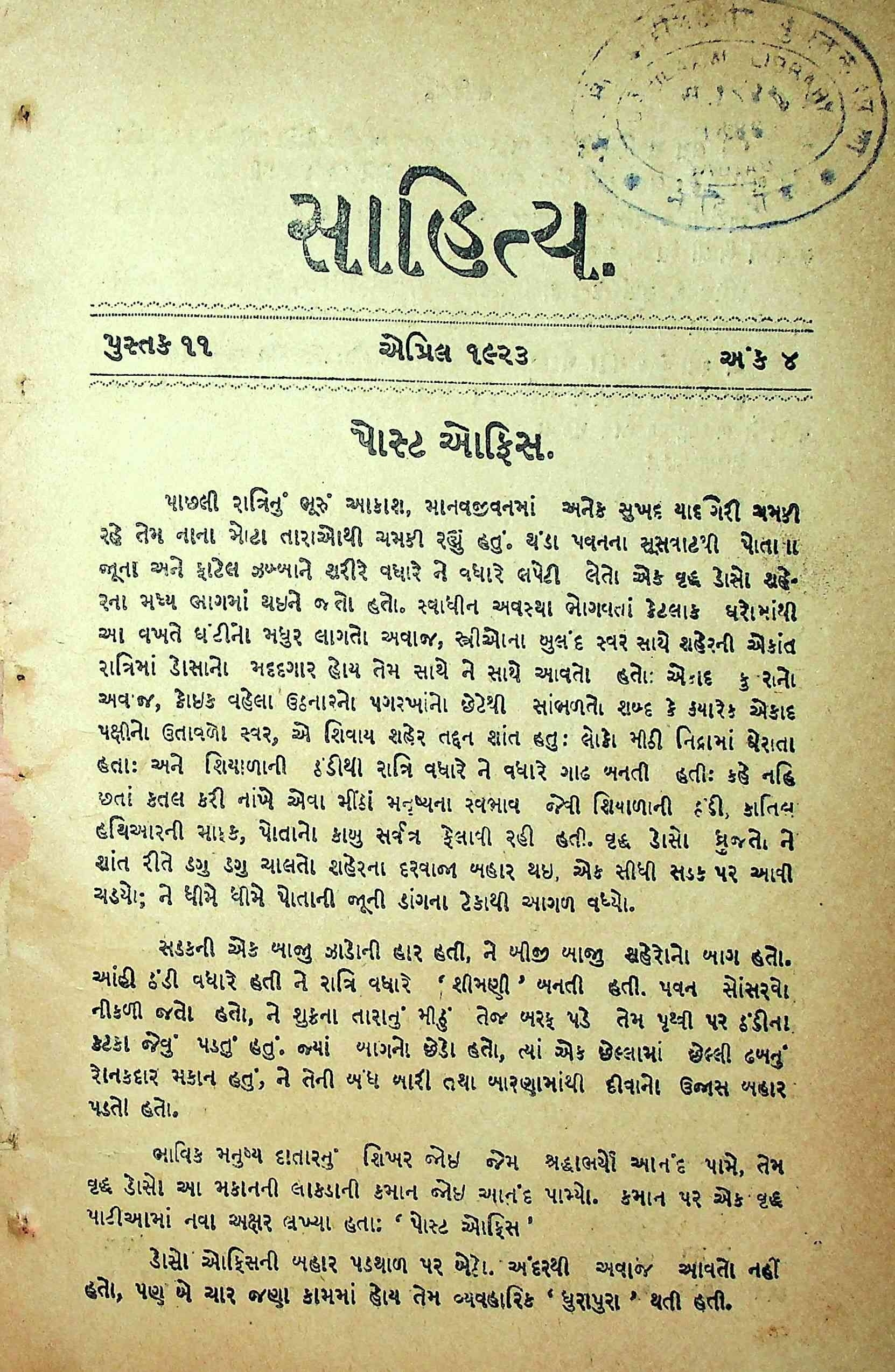
- April 1923 issue of Sahitya, where the story first appeared
- Original title: પોસ્ટઑફિસ (Post Office)
- Translator: Dhumketu
- Country: India
- Language: Gujarati

Publication
- Published in: Sahitya
- Publication type: Magazine
- Publication date: April 1923

"Post Office" is a Gujarati short story written by Indian writer Dhumketu (1892–1965). It was first published in 1923 and is considered Dhumketu's most famous and frequently anthologized short story. The story is about a father's affection for his daughter, and the apathetic bureaucracy of the local post office. It is notable for its description, narrative, and dialogues.

== Publication ==
"Post Office" was first published in the literary journal Sahitya in April 1923. It was later published in Dhumketu's first short story collection, Tankha (lit. 'The Sparks') Vol. 1, in 1926.

== Plot ==
The story takes place during wartime. The protagonist, Ali Coachman, was a legendary hunter in his early life, but he gives up hunting after his daughter Mariyam marries a soldier. Mariyam leaves her father and moves to Punjab with her husband. After that, Ali waits for a letter from Mariam and goes to the local post office every day before sunrise for five years. One day, when he realizes that he might die soon, he gives five gold coins to the post office clerk Lakshmi Das and asks him to deliver Mariyam's letter to his grave if it comes after his death. The postmaster and his staff make fun of Ali's daily routine. One day Ali stops coming to the post office, and the postmaster starts waiting for his daughter's letter. One day he notices a letter from Mariyam addressed to Ali. He goes to Ali's grave with Lakshmi Das and places Mariam's letter on it.

== Reception ==
Considered to be a landmark in Gujarati literature, "Post Office" is notable for its description, narrative and dialogues. It is the most famous and frequently anthologised short story of Dhumketu. The story was first translated into English by Dhumketu himself under the title "The Letter". Another English translation was done by Mira Naik under the title "Miriam's Letter".
