= The Deccan Times =

Defunct weekly newspaper in India

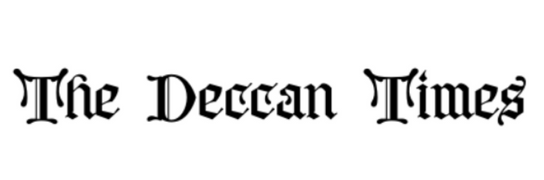
- Founded: 1938
- Ceased publication: December 1950
- Language: English
- Headquarters: Madras, Madras Presidency

The Deccan Times was an English-language weekly newspaper published from Madras (now Chennai) in the Madras Presidency. It was founded in 1938 by Naganachiketh Chinnamuttevi.

== History ==
The Deccan Times was established in 1938 in Madras during the late colonial period of British India. It was part of the English-language press that developed in urban centres such as Madras, which served as an important administrative and cultural hub.

The newspaper operated as a weekly publication and contributed to the regional print media landscape of the time.

== Publication ==
The newspaper was published in English and circulated from Madras in the Madras Presidency. As a weekly publication, it formed part of the periodical press that catered to English-reading audiences in South India.

== Closure ==
The Deccan Times ceased publication in December 1950. The closure came during a period of transition in India's media landscape following independence in 1947, when many smaller publications faced challenges in sustaining operations.

== Legacy ==
A modern digital platform using the name The Deccan Times has been launched in the 21st century. According to its official website, the platform states that it is an independent initiative inspired by the historical newspaper and has no official connection with the original publication (1938–1950).
