= Maloney =

Maloney is a surname of Irish origin. The name 'Maloney' is derived from the Irish Ó Maoldhomhnaigh.

Notable people with the surname include:

- Anna Maloney, British screenwriter
- Bill Maloney, (born 1958), American businessman and politician from West Virginia; co-founder of North American Drillers
- Brian Maloney, Irish Gaelic football player
- Carolyn B. Maloney (born 1948), American politician
- Charles Garrett Maloney (1913–2006), American Roman Catholic bishop
- Christopher Maloney (disambiguation), several people
- Dan Maloney (1950–2018), Canadian professional ice hockey player
- Dave Maloney (born 1956), Canadian professional ice hockey player
- David Maloney (1933–2006), British television director and producer
- David Maloney (musician), of the American folk duo Reilly & Maloney
- Don Maloney (author) (1926–2007), American author on Japanese subjects
- Don Maloney (born 1958), Canadian professional ice hockey player and manager
- Edward Maloney, American politician
- Edward T. Maloney, American aviation historian and museum curator
- Evan Coyne Maloney (born 1972), American blogger and web chat developer
- Francis T. Maloney (1894–1945), American politician
- Franklin J. Maloney (1899–1958), American politician
- Gary Maloney (born 1958), American political consultant
- James Maloney (rugby league) (born 1986), Australian rugby league player
- James H. Maloney (born 1948), American politician
- Jack Maloney (born 1994), English professional football player
- Jim Maloney (born 1940), American professional baseball player
- Joe Maloney (1934–2006), English professional football player
- John David Maloney (born 1945), Canadian politician from Ontario; member of the House of Commons
- John F. Malony (1857–1919), American lawyer, businessman, and politician
- Julia Faye Maloney (1892–1966), American actress
- Kellie Maloney (born 1953), British boxing promoter
- Kevin P. Maloney (born 1958), American real estate developer
- Kristen Maloney (born 1981), American Olympic gymnast
- Lennard Maloney (born 1999), German-American soccer player
- Leo D. Maloney (1885–1929), American actor and film director of the silent era
- Martin Maloney (disambiguation), several people
- Marv Maloney (1942–2011), American politician from Missouri
- Matt Maloney (born 1971), American professional basketball player
- Matt M. Maloney, American entrepreneur and business executive
- Michael Maloney (born 1957), English actor
- Patty Maloney (1936–2025), American actress
- Paul H. Maloney (1876–1967), American politician
- Rich Maloney (born c. 1964), American college baseball coach at University of Michigan
- Robert S. Maloney (1881–1934), American politician from Massachusetts, U.S. representative
- Samantha Maloney (born 1975), American musician and drummer
- Seamus Maloney, Australian rules footballer and coach
- Sean Patrick Maloney (born 1966), American lawyer and politician from New York; adviser to President Clinton
- Shafiqua Maloney (born 1999), Saint Vincent and the Grenadines athlete
- Shane Maloney, Australian author of the Murray Whelan series of novels
- Shaun Maloney (born 1983), Scottish footballer
- Stephen Maloney (1960–2021), Australian tennis player
- Steve Maloney, English rock bassist with the band The Blood Divine
- Tim Maloney, American filmmaker and animator
- Virginia Maloney, American politician
- William F. Maloney, economist
- William Maloney (politician) (1854–1940), Australian politician from Melbourne; member of the House of Representatives
- Zane Maloney, Barbadian motorsport pilot

== See also ==
- Maloney, Kentucky, an unincorporated community
- Boulevard Maloney (Gatineau), road in Quebec, Canada
- Maloney Elementary School, Fremont, California, USA
- Maloney Gardens, Trinidad and Tobago
- Maloney Hall, chemistry building at The Catholic University of America
- Maloney House (Lockport, New York), historic home in Niagara County
- Moloney (disambiguation)
