= Birrarung Marr, Melbourne =

Public park in Melbourne, Australia

Birrarung Marr
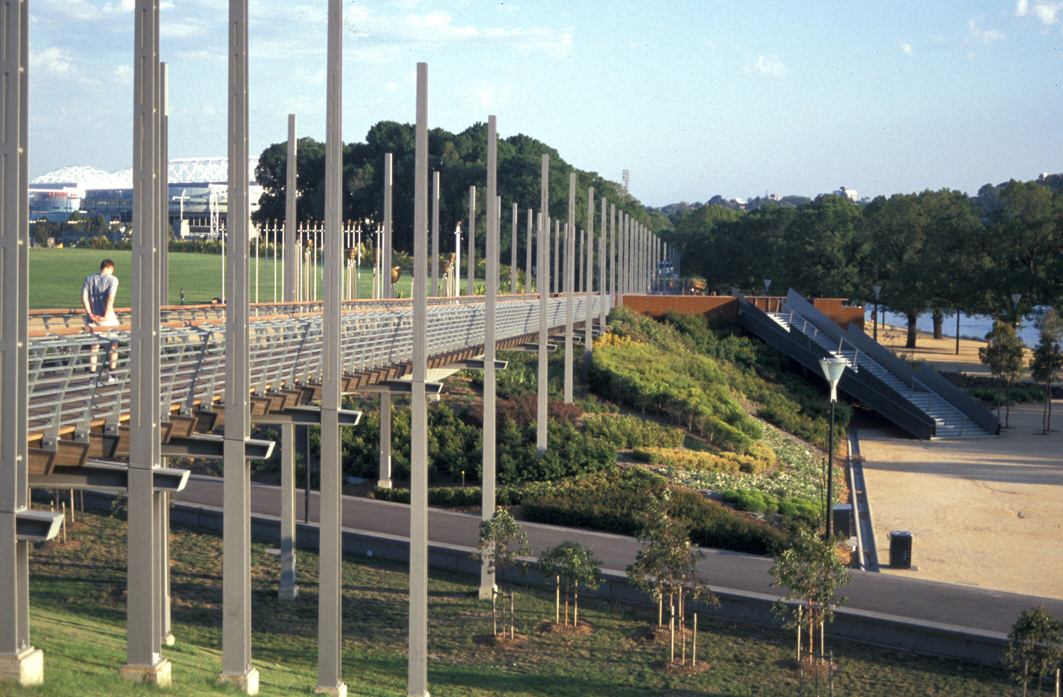
- Pedestrian bridge in Birrarung Marr

- Location within Melbourne
- Interactive map of Birrarung Marr
- Type: Urban park
- Location: Melbourne, Victoria, Australia
- Coordinates: 37°49′6″S 144°58′21″E
- Area: 8 ha (20 acres)
- Created: 2000
- Opened: 26 January 2002; 24 years ago
- Operator: City of Melbourne
- Open: All year
- Status: Open
- Awards: Walter Burley Griffin Award for Urban Design (2004); AILA (Vic) (2003 x2)
- Paths: Pedestrian and bicycle access throughout
- Terrain: Floodplain with built-up terraces
- Water: Yarra River
- Vegetation: Contemporary formal gardening featuring Australian native plants
- Public transit: – Flinders Street, Anzac; –; – 340, 479; – Federation Square, Yarra River Trail, Capital City Trail, William Barak Bridge
- Landmarks: Speakers' Corner; William Barak Bridge; ArtPlay; Federation Bells; Angel and other sculptures
- Facilities: Barbecues; drinking fountains; playground; toilets
- Website: melbourne.vic.gov.au

Victorian Heritage Register
- Official name: Yarra Bank (Speakers Corner)
- Type: Registered place
- Designated: 23 October 1997
- Reference no.: H1363
- Heritage overlay no.: HO394
- Categories: Community Facilities; Parks, Gardens and Trees

Birrarung Marr is an eight-hectare (20-acre) urban park located between the city centre of Melbourne and the Yarra River, in Victoria, Australia. Opened in 2002 on the traditional lands and waterways of the Wurundjeri, the park is operated by the City of Melbourne.

Contained with the park is the Speakers' Corner, added to the Victorian Heritage Register on 23 October 1997 as a place of historic and social significance.

== Location ==
Situated on the northern bank of the Yarra River between Federation Square and Melbourne Park, Birrarung Marr features a range of native flora and sculpted terraces. It is also the location for the children's arts centre, ArtPlay, and provides space for many events held throughout the year.

The park lies immediately to the south-east of the central business district, between Flinders Street and the north bank of the Yarra River, east of Flinders Street station, and west of Exhibition Street, Batman Avenue and the Rod Laver Arena.

== Etymology ==
The name, Birrarung Marr, comes from the Woiwurrung language of the Wurundjeri, meaning "beside the river", where Birrarung is the Woiwurrung word for the Yarra River. The name was applied to the park after the design was adopted.

== History ==
The park is located on the traditional lands and waterways of the Wurundjeri.

=== 19th century ===
In 1856 the Colonial government indicated that the marshy site of Birrarung Marr was intended for park or ornamental purposes. However, several institutions including a morgue had already been established there, more still were developed, and facilities including the old State Swimming Centre remained until the late 20th century. The first rail line crossed the area in 1859 and railways eventually occupied most of the parkland between Melbourne's central business district and the Yarra River. At the 19th century's end, these impacts were outstripped by reconstruction of the Yarra River itself, which was straightened, widened and deepened, with tree-lined avenues formed along the built-up banks.

The heritage-listed Speakers' Corner was established on this site in 1889.

=== 20th century ===
In 1992, Premier Jeff Kennett initiated a development program focused on central Melbourne. For the centrepiece of this program, the Victorian Government and City of Melbourne jointly sponsored an architectural design competition for Federation Square. The creation of Birrarung Marr resulted from the reorganisation of infrastructure and land uses near Federation Square, including clearance of the Jolimont railyards, and diversion of Batman Avenue away from the river bank to connect to Exhibition Street. These works enabled reclamation of land from the former rail yards and roadway to create Melbourne's first significant new inner city park in one hundred years.

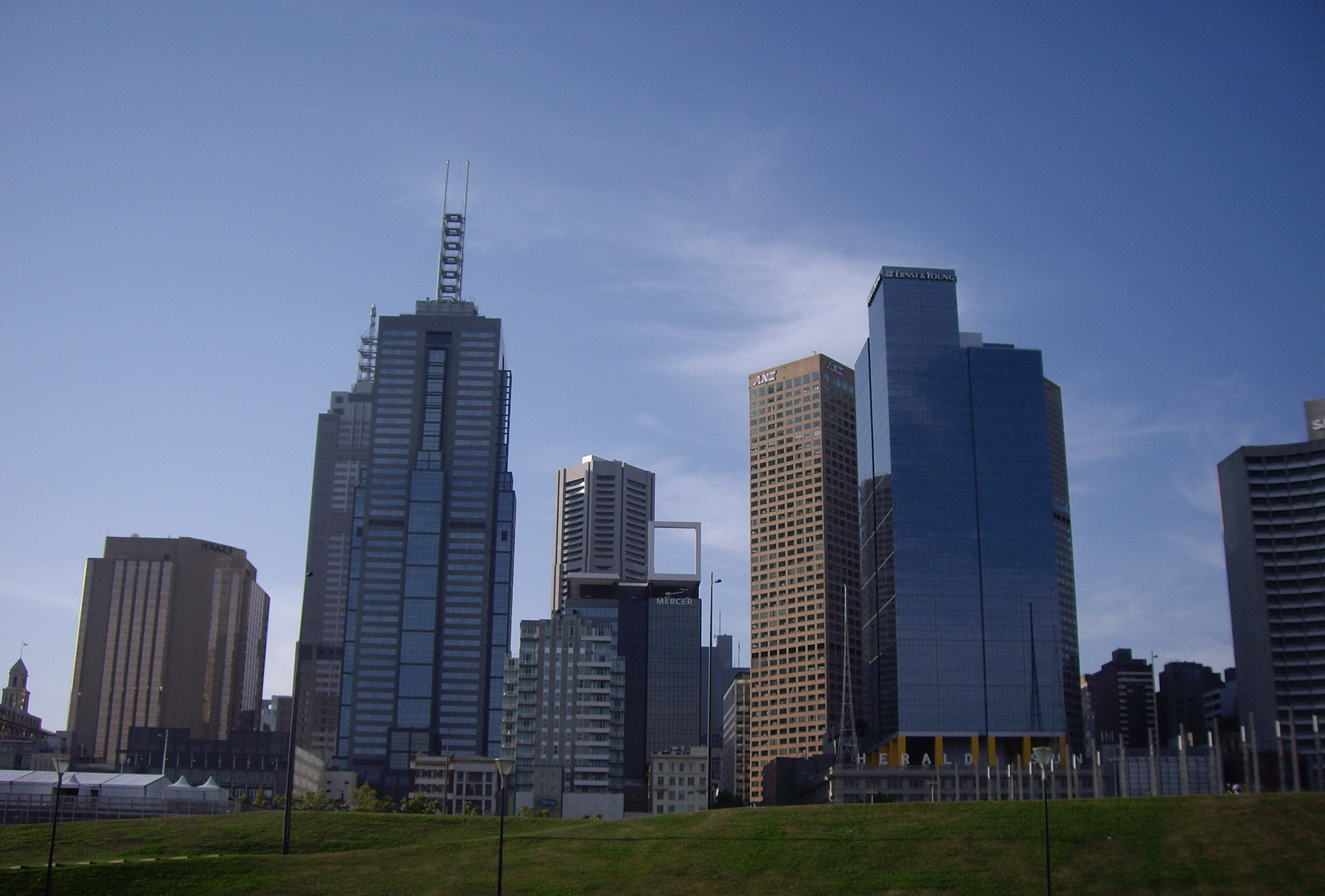
View of Melbourne from Birrarung Marr.

=== 21st century ===
Construction of Birrarung Marr began in 2000. The project was a joint venture by the City of Melbourne, which provided A$15.6 million to design and build the park, and the Victorian Government, which funded the railway rationalisation and clearance of the site. The park was opened to the public on Australia Day, 26 January 2002.

==== The park design ====
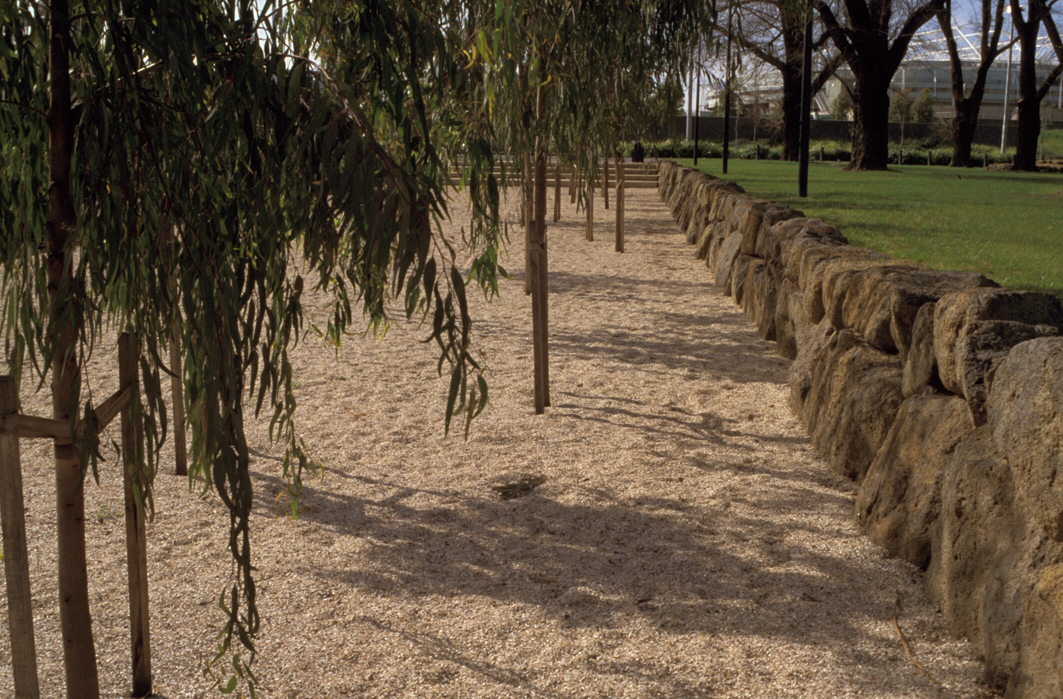
The shell-grit surface in the south channel, near Speakers' Corner

The initial schemes for Birrarung Marr proposed a 'festival park', a largely commercial venue supporting the State's use of sporting and cultural events such as the Australian Grand Prix to position Melbourne in the international marketplace. However, the City emphasised a broader role as social venue supporting individual and community activities as well as major events. From either viewpoint, Birrarung Marr was envisaged as an active, urban space, more like beachside promenades than the older public gardens in other parts of Melbourne, such as the Fitzroy Gardens. The intent was to provide a robust setting for events such as Circus Oz and the Moomba Waterfest, changing sculpture exhibitions, and community festivals while providing an attractive setting for passive recreation at other times. The park also provides walking and cycle access between the city centre and the sporting precinct to the south-east, and forms a link in the Capital City Trail, which provides continuous bike access along the Yarra River.

Birrarung Marr was therefore designed as a series of level open terraces. The lower terrace, next to the river, has a gravel surface. The middle terrace is on the east side of the park, adjacent to Batman Avenue, and has a grassed surface. The upper grassed terrace on the north side of the park is at the same level as Flinders Street, about 10 metres above the river bank. (The upper terrace was intended to link to the top deck of the Federation Square carpark, which was ultimately not built to the agreed brief although its extension is now being considered.) The massive terraces were formed on the level railyard site using spoil generated by works on the adjoining rail lines, Federation Square, and construction of the nearby Melbourne Arena. Basalt boulders from these excavations were also re-used in the park to form retaining walls.

The layout of the park emphasises lines of sight to various Melbourne landmarks such as the spires of the Victorian Arts Centre and St Paul's Cathedral and the Rialto office tower. The shaping of the terraces and the drainage channels between them lined with river red gums evoke the billabongs once found on the site, and the linear paths and bridge structures also suggest the railways that dominated the site through much of Melbourne's history. The park's open spaces are largely shielded from nearby traffic, and the park is remarkably quiet and peaceful given its proximity to major roads and railways.

Awards

The design has received various awards including the Royal Australian Institute of Architects' Walter Burley Griffin Award for Urban Design in 2004, and the Australian Institute of Landscape Architects (Victoria) Awards for Excellence in Planning and Excellence in Design in 2003.

== Features and facilities ==
A long ramping footbridge within the park, designed by architects Swaney Draper, links the three terrace levels and provides disabled access.

=== Speakers' Corner ===
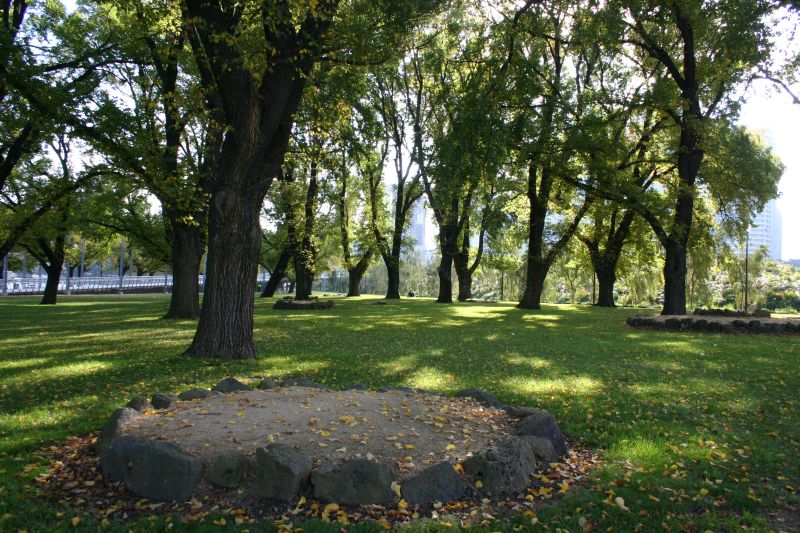
Speakers' Corner

The heritage-listed Speakers' Corner, also known as Yarra Bank, in the south-eastern corner of Birrarung Marr, was a remnant of Yarra Park between the Jolimont Rail Yards and Yarra River that was used as a location for public lectures, protests and demonstrations. Modelled on similar spaces in London and Sydney and elsewhere, Dr William Maloney campaigned successfully in 1889 to have a place set aside for the purpose of "holding public meetings and discussing questions - religious, educational and others". In 1916, an estimated 50,000 people came to protest against conscription and heard from Vida Goldstein and Adela Pankhurst. These activities had been moved to the north bank of the Yarra River after construction of the Queen Victoria Monument at their earlier venue on the south bank. The site was one of the few public spaces in Melbourne where large public assemblies and speeches were allowed without a prior permit. The mounds that speakers used to stand on to address these crowds can still be seen in this corner of Birrarung Marr, set in a grove of 36 mature elm trees.

There are barbecue facilities, as well as public toilets near Speakers' Corner. The Yarra River Trail traverses the park on its south side.

=== ArtPlay ===
One of the railway buildings remaining from the Jolimont railyards was converted into a children's art centre and cultural centre, called ArtPlay. ArtPlay opened in 2004 and runs a range of workshops where children and families can undertake creative arts workshops alongside artists of all disciplines. ArtPlay is open to the public on weekends and during school holidays and works with schools during weekdays. In 2006 ArtPlay worked with over 20,000 children, offering nearly 300 different workshops, performances and events. A children's playground has been developed next to this building and a series of creative arts workshops often extend into this space from ArtPlay. Following the success of ArtPlay, The City of Melbourne has developed a similar arts program in the heart of the city for teenagers called Signal, located adjacent to Flinders Street station.

=== Sculptures and other structures ===
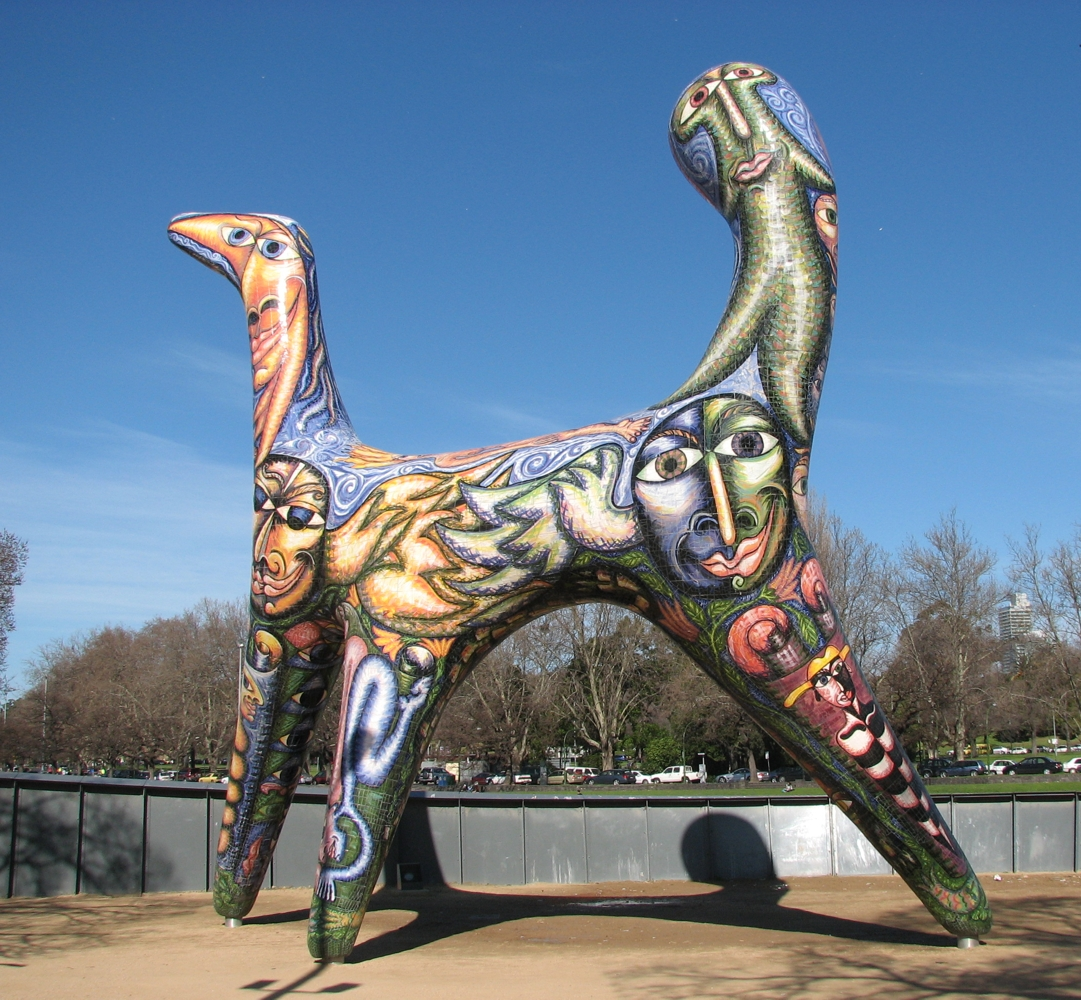
Angel by Deborah Halpern

The ten-metre-high (33 ft), three-legged Angel was installed along the river bank in 2006. The sculpture was commissioned from Melbourne mosaic artist Deborah Halpern for installation in the 'moat' in front of the National Gallery of Victoria in 1985, and off-loaded by the Gallery when major renovations were undertaken in 1999.

The William Barak Bridge was opened in December 2005 for the 2006 Commonwealth Games and provides pedestrian access between the middle terrace of Birrarung Marr over the CityLink toll road and railways to the vicinity of the Melbourne Cricket Ground.

Federation Bells

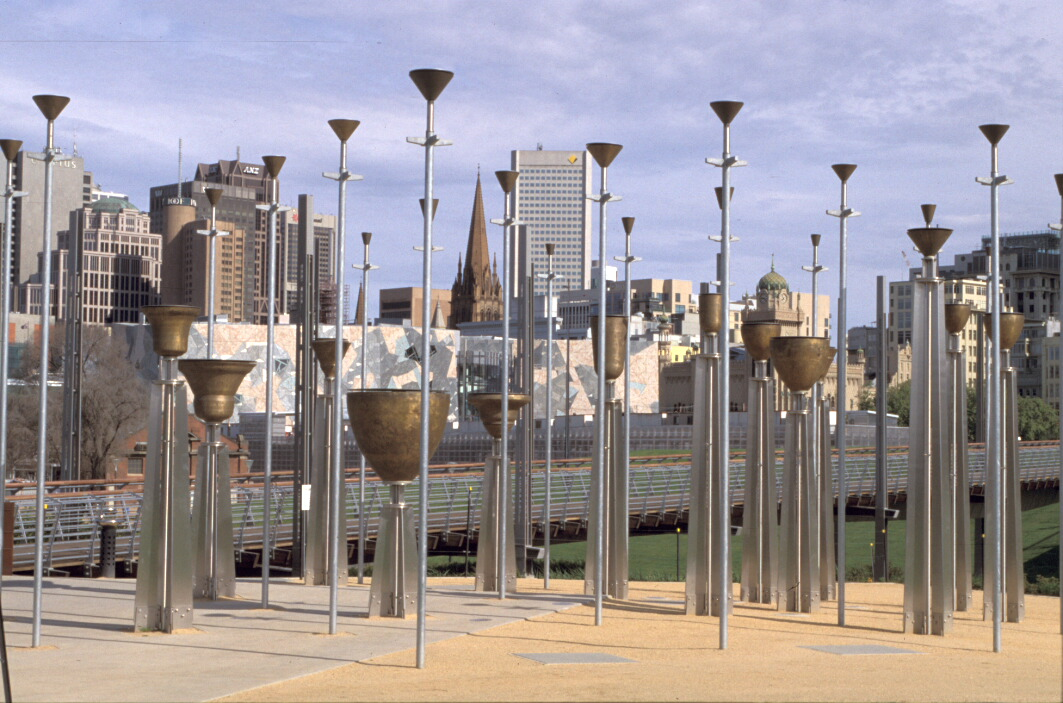
The Federation Bells

The Federation Bells on the middle terrace, commissioned in 2001, are a collection of inverted bells comprising nine different design types of various sizes from half a kilogram to 1.2 tonnes mounted on steel poles. The result is not unlike a collection of church bells, however they are spread through an open space rather than being confined to a tower, allowing people to walk between them. There are thirty-nine bells in total, spanning 3 octaves. Tuned in the just intonation system, the bells are controlled by computer, and play an ever increasing range of compositions, some commissioned, some submitted by the public. This sound sculpture plays three times a day. The bells were designed by Neil McLachlan and Anton Hassel. In 2010, Spring Innovations were asked to design a new dynamic playing system that was publicly launched on 1 April 2012. Since then the bells have played over 11 million times annually with near complete reliability. They now monitor themselves and report on their playing status daily.

=== Horticulture ===
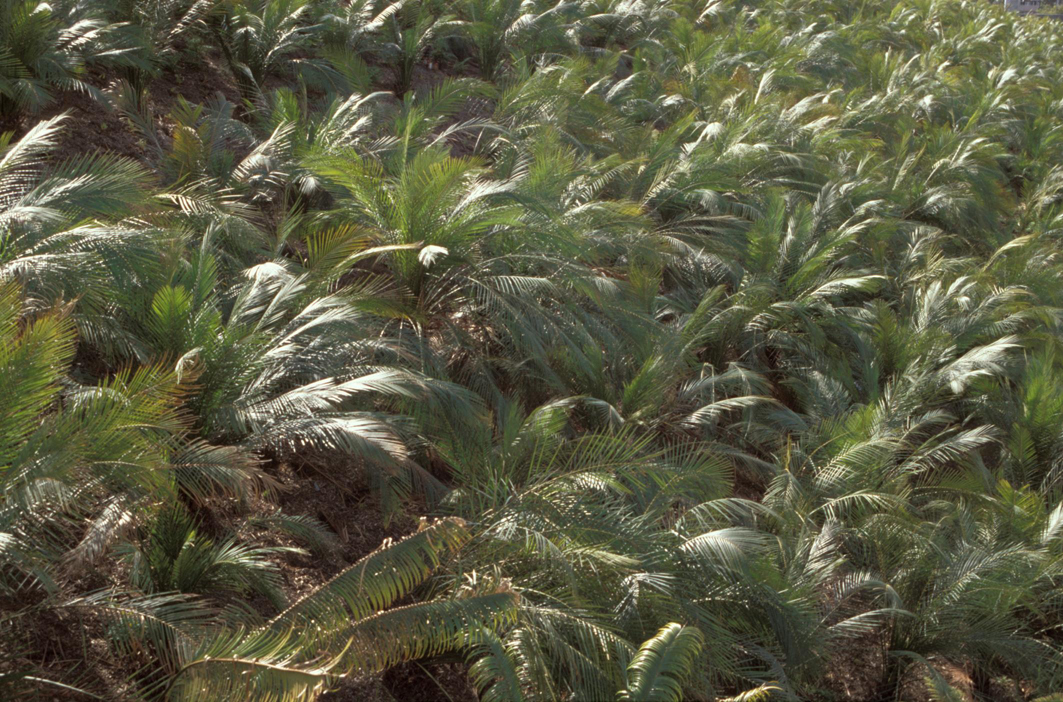
Macrozamia communis on the embankment of the middle terrace

In addition to the mature elms along the river bank and at Speakers' Corner, about 200 new trees were planted in the park during its construction. The new plantings focus on Australian species including a mass planting of Macrozamia communis (cycads) on the embankment overlooking Speakers' Corner. Also in this area are several Doryanthes excelsa (gymea lilies) and Lepidozamia peroffskyana (pineapple zamia, another cycad). Hundreds of smaller Australian native plants are also present although construction of the William Barak Bridge, which was not part of the original design for the park, destroyed one of the major display plantings on the north-facing embankment of the middle terrace.

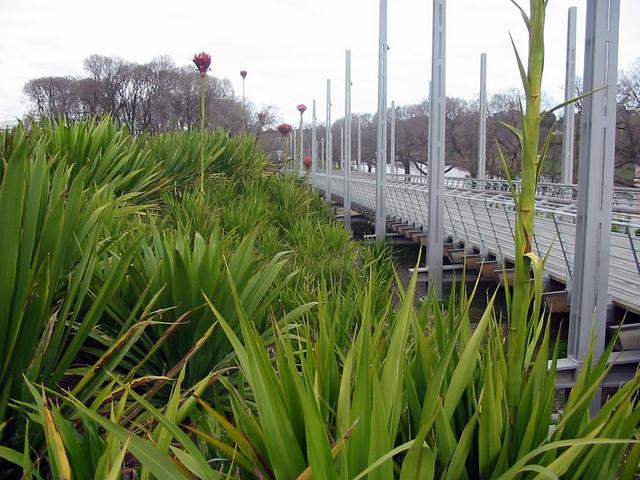
Doryanthes excelsa near the middle terrace.

Additional tree planting for shade and shelter was envisaged for the level areas of the upper and middle terraces, but has not yet been implemented.

== Gallery ==
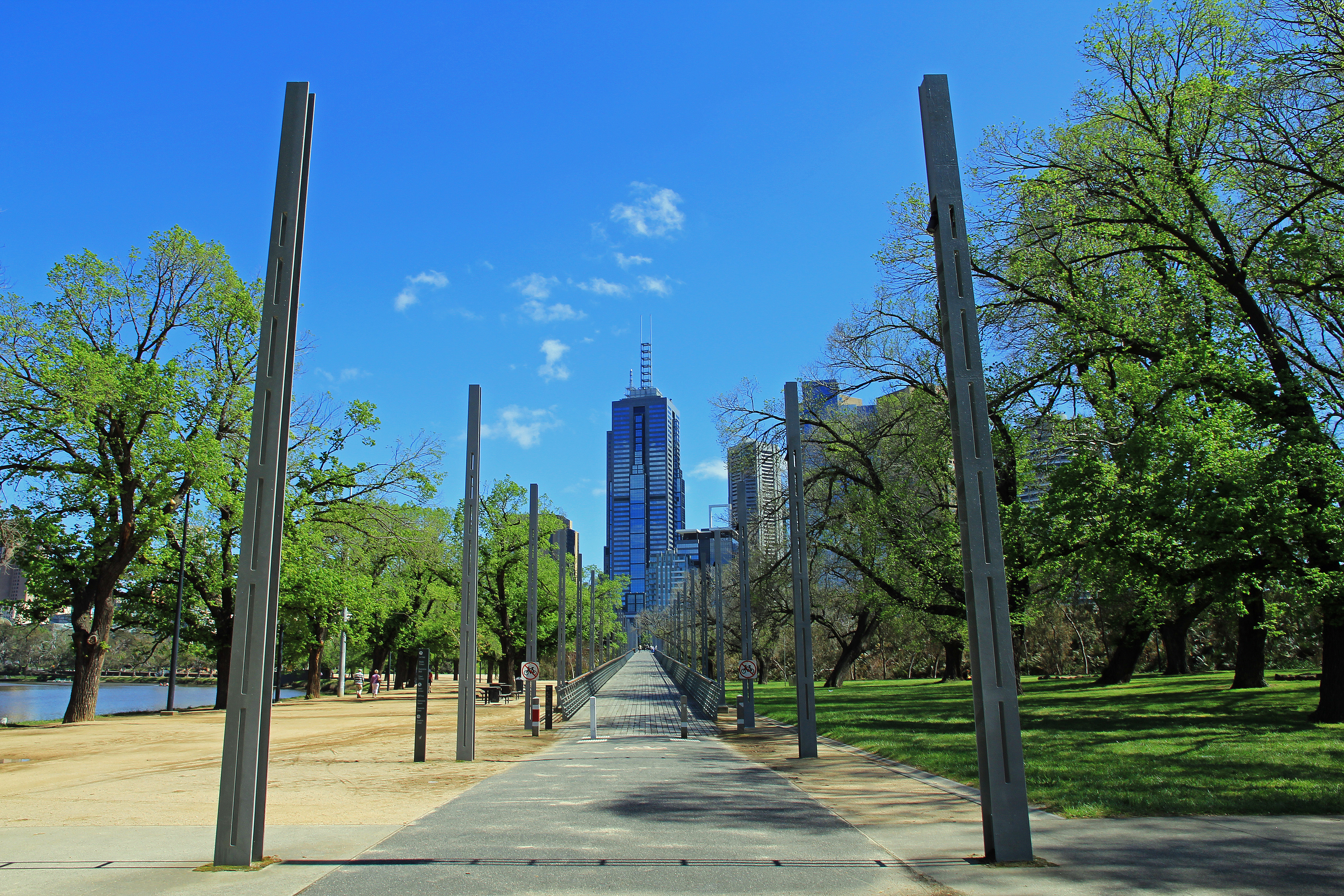
River of Mists and river bank architecture

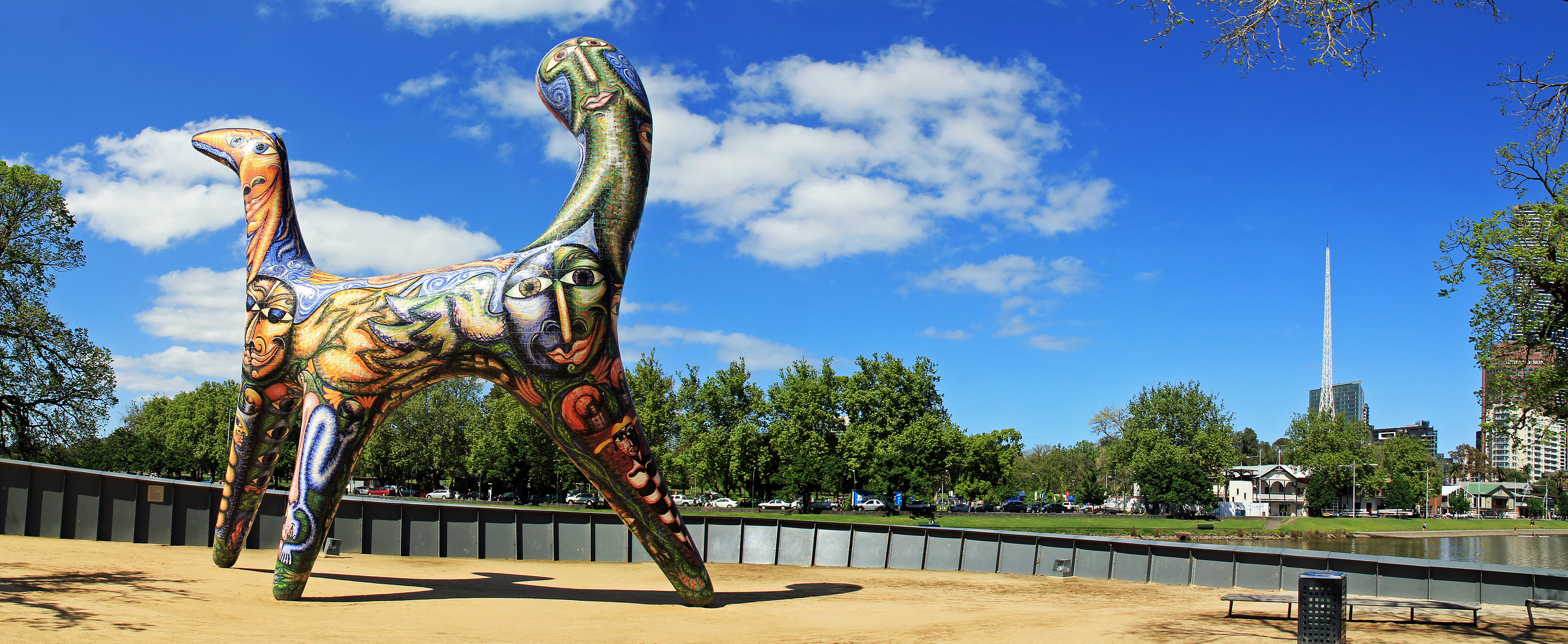
Deborah Halpern art sculpture

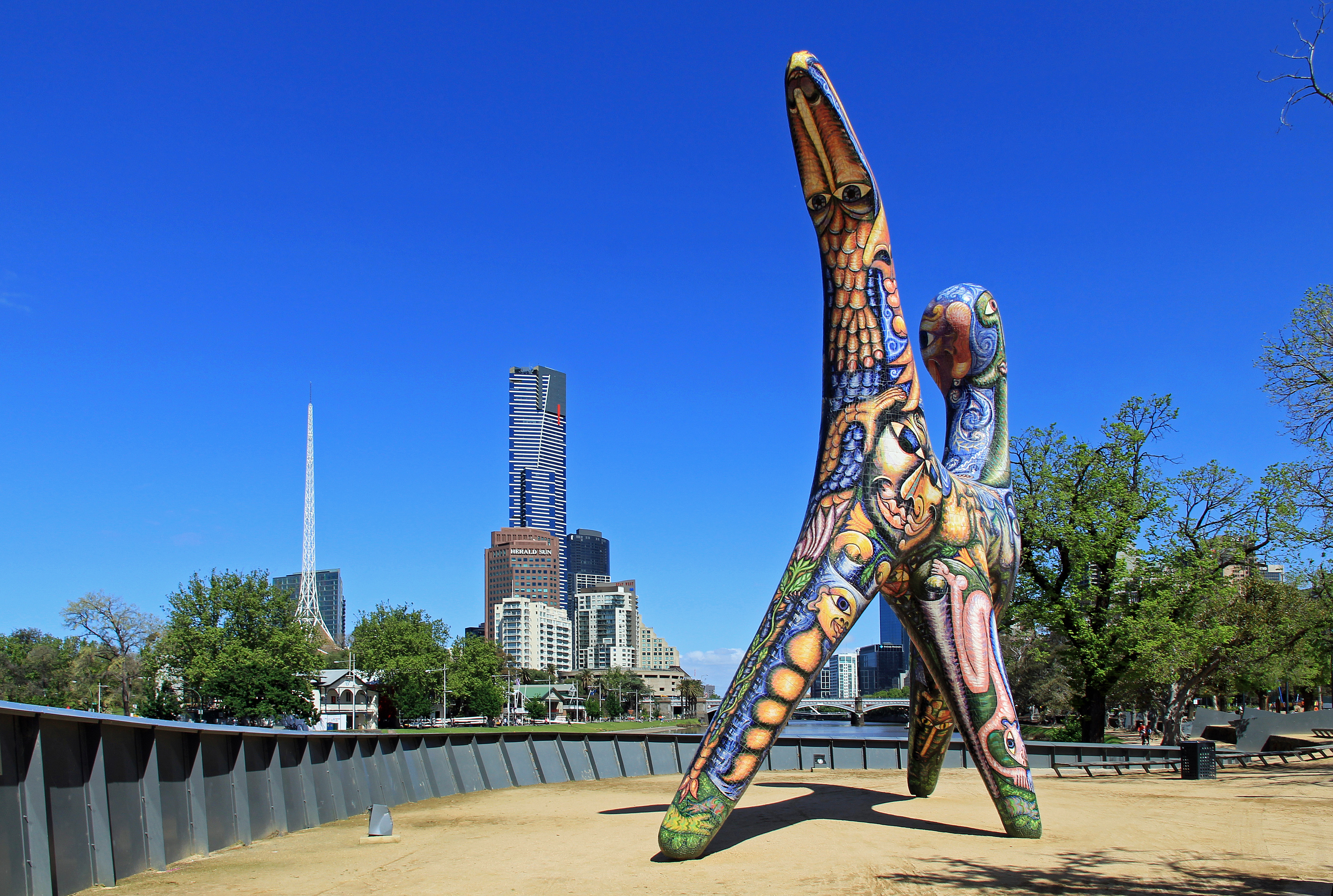
Deborah Halpern art sculpture and city skyline

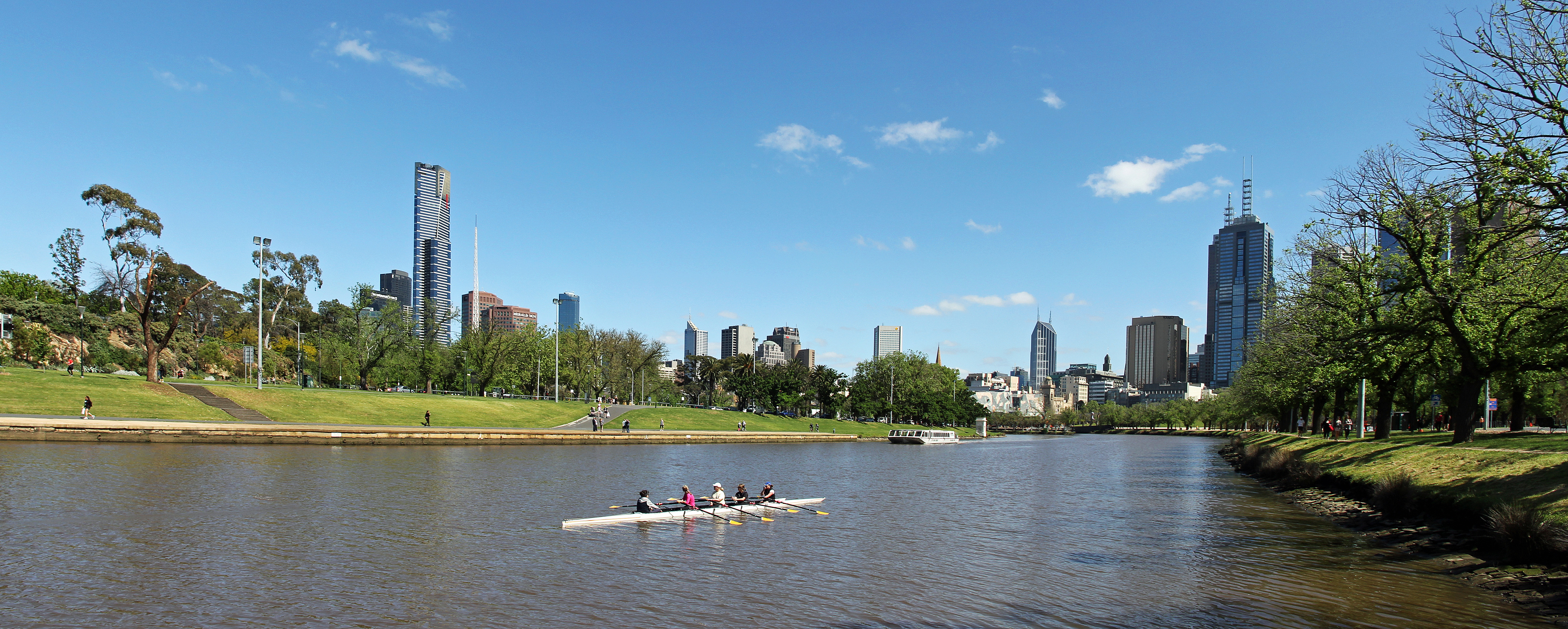
Yarra River flows along the northbank

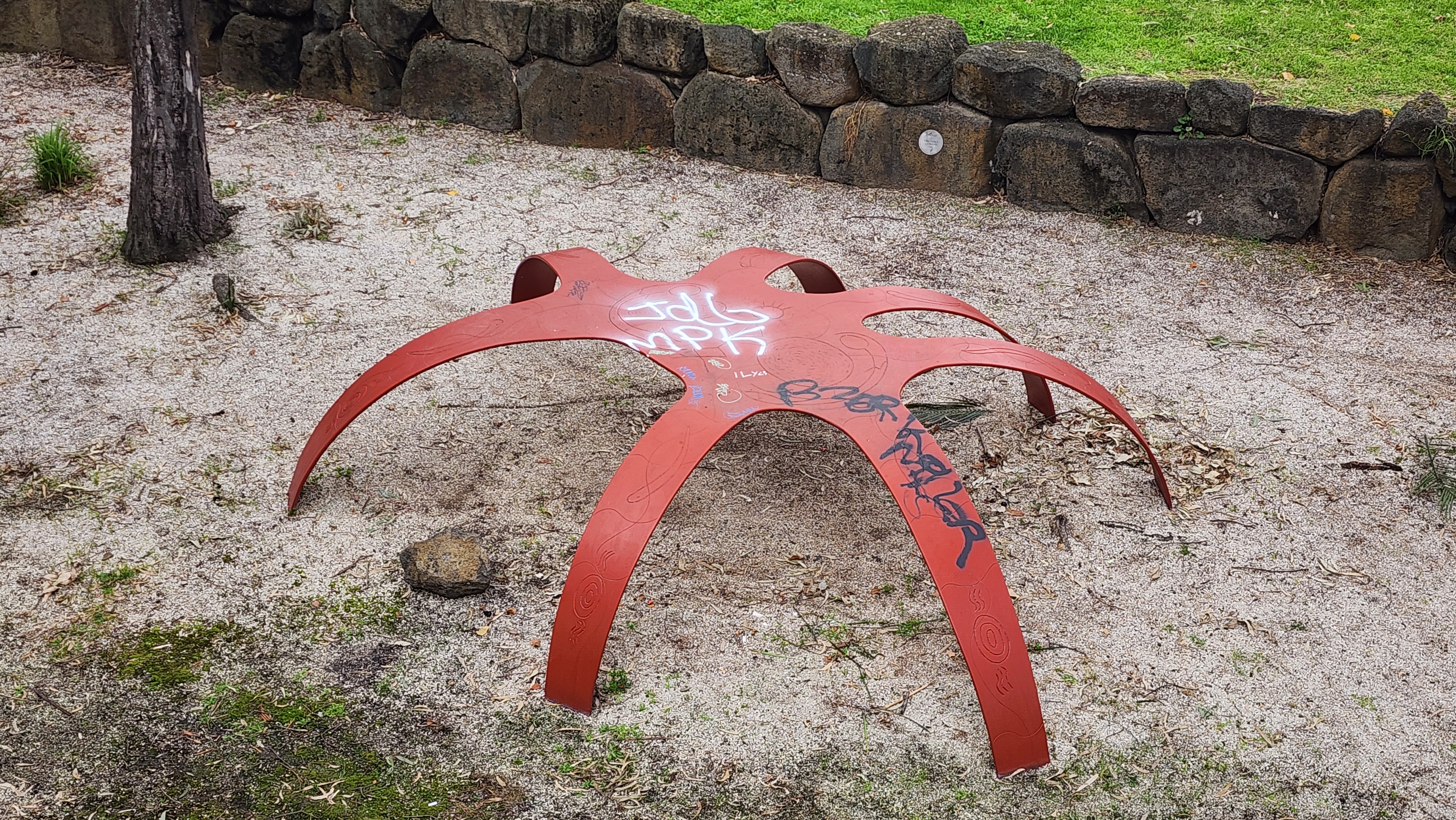
Eel Trap by Fiona Clarke and Ken McKean

== See also ==
- Parks and gardens of Melbourne
- List of public art in Melbourne
