= Moloney (surname) =

Moloney is a surname of Irish origin. Its Irish translation is Ó Maoldomhnaigh (for males) of Ni Mhaoldomhnaigh (female). This Irish surname is of true Gaelic stock and is seldom found with the original prefix 'O'. According to historian C. Thomas Cairney, the O'Molonys were one of the chiefly families of the Dal gCais or Dalcassians who were a tribe of the Erainn who were the second wave of Celts to settle in Ireland between about 500 and 100 BC. They were a powerful Dalcassian sept who were Chiefs of Kiltanon near Tulla in County Clare, spreading to the adjoining counties of Limerick and Tipperary, where today they are to be found in their greatest numbers.

== Derivation theories ==
=== Maol ===
The family history of the ancient name Moloney was found in a book written in the 6th century by Saint Colum Cille; the psalter known as the Cathach or "Book of Battles". The name in its original form is Ó Maoldomhnaigh, translating into English as "descendant of Sunday's servant".

Some sources suggest that "maol" in this context means "bald", and refers to the distinctive tonsure common in the early Irish church, while domhnach means "Sunday", and was used by extension to refer to the place of worship on that day.

=== Molua ===
Other sources and local historians point to an origin that the family are descendants of Saint Molua as rumours of him fathering children was often talked of in the region. Killaloe was most likely named after him (Cill-a-loe or 'church of Lua'). He was from a sept associated with the Ui Fidgenti from the Limerick area, themselves descendants of the Corca Oíche, an ancient tribe, possibly of Pictish origin, existing since pre-Christian times in Ireland. As such, some sources claim that they descended from the semi-legendary hero Dubthach Dóeltenga, or more commonly that they are descended from Oíche or Óchae, the daughter of Cronn Badhraoi of the Dál nAraidi, and her son Fergus Foga last king of the Ulaid to rule at Emain Macha.

== Spelling variations ==
The version of this surname that spread to Ulster as the Gaelic 'Mac Giolla Dhomnaigh', ( McEldowney in English) which is found principally in counties Antrim and Londonderry, both were sometimes used for the illegitimate offspring of clergymen.

Variants of Moloney include O'Maloney, Moloney, Molony, Malone, Melaney and Muldowney. Two Maloneys of the Kiltanon sept were successive Bishops of Killaloe for a period of more than seventy years. The younger John O'Moloney, 1617–1702, was known both for his intellectual attainments as a university professor in Paris, and later for his resistance to the persecution of Catholics in Ireland.

In addition O Maolfhachtna, a north Tipperary name, is now generally found as Moloney, perhaps reflecting the proximity of the Clare family. Other, rare, anglicisations of this name include Loughney and MacLoughney.

O Maolanfaidh, a Cork name usually rendered Molumby, is also on occasion found as Moloney.

The Moloney family are represented in the placenames of their home territory, with Ballymoloney in Killokennedy parish in Clare and Feenagh (Moloney) in Feenagh parish in the same county

== Notable people with this name ==
- Ann Moloney, American politician
- Cliodhna Moloney (born 1993), Irish rugby union player
- Cornelius Alfred Moloney (1848–1913), British colonial administrator
- Daniel Moloney (1909–1963), Irish Fianna Fáil Party politician; representative for Kerry North
- David Molony (1950–2002), Irish Fine Gael Party Senator and TD
- Denis Moloney (contemporary), Northern Ireland solicitor, advocate and notary public
- Ed Moloney (contemporary), Irish journalist and author
- Frederick Moloney (1882–1941), American Olympic athlete in the hurdles
- Helena Molony (1883–1967), Irish republican, Easter Rising veteran and trade unionist
- Janel Moloney, American actress
- John Moloney (disambiguation), several people
- Joseph Moloney (1857–1896), Irish-born British explorer
- Maurice Moloney (b. 1952?), Irish-born research biologist and businessman
- Maurice T. Moloney (1849–1917), American lawyer
- Mike Moloney (Gaelic footballer)
- Mike Moloney (politician), American politician
- Mick Moloney (contemporary), Irish musician of traditional Irish music
- Niamh Moloney, Professor of Law
- Paddy Moloney (1938–2021), Irish musician; founders of the Irish musical group The Chieftains
- P. J. Moloney (1869–1947), Irish Sinn Féin politician
- Parker Moloney (1879–1961), Australian politician
- Peter Joseph Moloney (1891–1989), Canadian biochemist and medical researcher
- Raymond Moloney (1900–1958), American inventor, founder of Balley Manufacturing
- Robert Moloney, Canadian actor
- Ryan Moloney (b. 1979), Australian soap opera actor
- Susie Moloney (b. 1962), Canadian author of horror fiction
- Tom Moloney (businessman) (b. 1962), British businessman

== See also ==
- Maloney
- Irish clans
