= Mike Moloney =

Mike Moloney may refer to:

- Mike Moloney (Gaelic footballer) (born 1988), Gaelic footballer for Kerry
- Mike Moloney (politician) (born 1941), American politician in Kentucky

== See also ==
- Mick Moloney (born 1944), Irish musician and scholar
- Michael Joseph Moloney (1912–1991), Irish-born priest in Gambia
