= Moloney =

Moloney may refer to:

- Moloney (surname), people with the surname Moloney
- Moloney (TV series), 1996–97 American television police drama

== See also ==
- Maloney
- Moloney's Mimic Bat
