= Tom Moloney =

Tom or Thomas Moloney may refer to:

- Tom Moloney (businessman), British businessman
- Tom Moloney (rugby union) (born 1994), Australian rugby union player
- Thomas W. Moloney (1862–1917), American politician and lawyer from Vermont

== See also ==
- Thomas Molony
- Thomas Maloney (disambiguation)
