= Kendell Kardt =

American singer-songwriter

- Born: Kendell Rudolph Bernard Kardt; February 27, 1943 (age 83); Brooklyn, New York, United States
- Occupations: Songwriter, poet, author, singer, pianist, guitarist, organist, composer, arranger
- Years active: 1962–present
- Spouse(s): Lynne Charles, Carla May Richardson, Sandra Savino, Margaret Krautschneider
- Parent(s): Henry Otto Kardt, Imgard Sophie Louise Muller
- Website: kendellkardt.com

Kendell Kardt (born February 27, 1943) is an American songwriter, poet, author, composer, arranger, recording artist, and performer whose career spans 1962 to the present. He has recorded albums for Capitol Records (1969) with the group Rig, as well as solo albums for Columbia Records (1972) and for Bill Graham Productions (1971). In addition, his original songs have been recorded by artists including Jim Post, Ronnie Montrose, and Reilly & Maloney.

== Early life ==
Kardt was born in Ridgewood, Queens, New York, in 1943, and he grew up in Brooklyn and Queens, where he attended public schools and later, Queens College, City University of New York. Because Kardt's religious parents discouraged his “worldly” interest in music, he left home at age nineteen. He received his Bachelor of Arts Degree with a major in music in 1967. After attending college, he abandoned classical pursuits in favor of popular music, inspired by the rock bands of the 1960s.

== Career ==
=== Early career ===
While still in college Kardt joined his first rock band, a quartet, The Frozen Flowers, who performed locally in Queens at a storefront nightclub in Jackson Heights. They released one single, “Are You in Love,” written by band member Bob Zaidman (an acetate of the song can be heard on YouTube here: https://www.youtube.com/watch?v=48XFpokc8M8). After the breakup of the Frozen Flowers, Kardt performed briefly as a founding member of The Fugs in the mid-1960s. Meanwhile, Kardt began to pursue songwriting, at first with collaborator Matt Fried, and then on his own. He focused on developing a rock ensemble as a vehicle for his new songs. He took up the guitar and worked at developing rudimentary skills, leaving aside his early attempts as a pianist. Kardt had no formal training on either instrument.

=== Band collaboration ===
In 1967 Kardt formed a power trio, Black Betty, in which he was the bassist and lead vocalist. Additional members included Jack McNichol on guitar. Black Betty performed in Manhattan for a year, occasionally at trendy night spots, including Steve Paul's Scene and the Village Gate where they opened for acts such as the Siegel-Schwall Band and Steve Winwood. The group attracted the attention of record company entrepreneur Jac Holzman, whose Elektra Records label was still based in New York. Holzman agreed to record Black Betty if the band found a replacement for McNichol. Kardt refused and the deal fell through. This would be the first of several incidents where Kardt's self-described “stubborn independence” clashed with record industry “pressure.” Ironically, McNichol would quit Black Betty shortly thereafter to join a Top 40 cover band.

The following year Kardt formed the quartet Rig, which also included guitarist Artie Richards, bassist Don Kerr, and drummer Rick Schlosser. After playing the New York club scene for 2 years, the group recorded a first album for Capitol Records, under the auspices of new manager, Bill Graham, on March 25, 26, 28, and 29, 1970 in New York City. The album, produced by Elliot Mazer and Adam Mitchell, appeared in 1970. (cite BY) The group played often at the Fillmore East and then toured nationally for a year booked through Herb Spar's Millard Agency, opening for acts such as The Who, Alice Cooper, Delaney & Bonnie and The New Riders of the Purple Sage.

At the end of 1970, Rig broke up and Kendell relocated to northern California with co-manager Mark Spector in order to be closer to Graham's San Francisco operation. In 1971, Kardt recorded a solo album scheduled for release on Capitol called "Buddy Bolden," which featured musicians such as Jerry Garcia, Ronnie Montrose, Spencer Dryden and Pamela Polland. Unfortunately, the album was shelved after an A&R shakeup at Capitol.

In 1972, Clive Davis signed Kardt to Columbia Records, where he recorded an unnamed album featuring the Memphis Horns and arrangements by Bill Pursell. That album was also shelved before completion in 1973.

=== Solo artist ===
On his own now, Kardt slowly achieved recognition through the 1970s as a songwriter and performer in the Chicago folk music scene, where his songs like “Buzzy and Jimmy,” “Dance, Gypsy Dance,” “Bicycle Wheel”, “Silver Engine and “Walk on the Water” became repertoire staples for singers such as Jim Post, Reilly & Maloney, and others.

Kardt continued to write and perform his compositions nationally as a solo artist until 1984. At that time he retired from performing and writing to devote himself to his family and other projects. Now living in rural New Hampshire, he married Carla Richardson.

=== Post-retirement ===
He joined three local amateur musicians, Watson Reid, Robin Reid, and Liza Hill to form a trio called Heartsong. This project was dedicated to performing well-known standards from the American songbook for local audiences. In 1985 the Reids relocated and Kardt re-formed the group as a quintet on a more professional footing. The permanent members included Terry landis, Carol Raynsford and David Lord. Kardt created a number of elaborate vocal arrangements for five singers who were now accompanied in concert by a bassist, drummer and pianist. Kardt played lead guitar. The group released one CD in 1987 before disbanding.

By 1987 Kardt had enlisted as accompanist and music director for a children's dance instruction program in the Cheshire County schools, called New Hampshire Dance Institute. As part of his responsibilities he wrote various numbers for their year-end showcase performances. In 1990, his final year with the program, he created lyrics and music for a full-scale musical entitled Let Your Light Shine, which was based on the life and work of inventor Thomas A. Edison.

In the summer of 1990, feeling that he had exhausted his creative possibilities in southern New Hampshire, Kardt decided to move on to greener - and warmer, pastures. After much consideration, he chose the city of Nashville, Tennessee as his new home. He had no immediate plans except to put his keyboard skills to good use to earn his living. After several false starts, peripherally connected to ‘country’ music, he happened upon a job as accompanist for the Nashville City Ballet Company. Although he had no experience whatever with either classical dance or its attendant musical repertoire he discovered that his improvisational talent served him well until he was able to acquire the requisite background. In short, what he thought would be a temporary expedient became the start of a new career, which would serve as his primary source of income for the next 19 years. After 2 years in Nashville he decided to relocate once more, which eventually found him in northern New Jersey, where he still resides. He continued to work with major ballet companies and dance studios in New York and New Jersey until his retirement in 2009. These include:

- American Ballet Theatre
- New York University Tisch School of Dance
- David Howard Studios
- Broadway Dance Center
- Northern Westchester Arts Center
- New Jersey Ballet

Princeton Ballet

== Contemporary projects ==
Once Kardt had established himself with gainful employment in the NYC metro area he turned his attention to various creative projects that have occupied him to the present time.

Poetry: Beginning in 1998, he began to attend and perform at a series of ‘alternative’ readings by local poets in New York's Lower East Side literary scene. For these venues he created an extensive body of work, about 200 poems, a few of which were published. These are available on his website at kendellkardt.com

Website: Around 2005, Kardt created his website, kendellkardt.com, to serve as a repository for his creative output. Its primary content was to be an archive of recorded performances, some live, some from studio recordings, made between 1969 and 1984. This was eventually expanded to include other material as well.

Memoir: Among these is an extended memoir detailing his life and career in a sometimes whimsical literary format with comments from his imaginary alter ego, Bernard Rudolph. The memoir concludes in January 2006 and is followed by a long epilogue, completed in 2014.

Other items on the website include a short story for children, titled The Pearl, a series of ‘Christmas’ pages containing his recording of Johann Sebastian Bach's keyboard pieces and assorted other works, a photo gallery, video and audio recordings of his live performances since 2009, as well as a complete catalog of lyrics to all his original songs with notes and annotations. In 2017, Kardt published The Pearl, with illustrations by Czech artist, Pavla Hovorkova, available on Amazon. com.

== Voluntary work ==
Since 2008 Kardt has worked as a volunteer teacher of English as a Second Language at the public library in Lodi, NJ, his hometown. In 2012 Kardt was given the Tutor of the Year award by the Pascack Valley Assn. of Literacy Volunteers. Among his students is Margaret Krautschneider, a Polish exchange student, who has completed her first book in English, published in Poland in 2017. Kendell and Margaret were married in May, 2019.

Beginning in 1980, Kardt, in anticipation of his retirement from performing, began to supplement his income with work as a church musician. He gradually adapted his piano skills to the organ. Over many years, until 2015, he served as organist in a number of churches in New Hampshire, Tennessee, and New Jersey.
