= William Maloney =

William Maloney may refer to:

- William Maloney (politician) (1854–1940), member of the Australian House of Representatives
- William R. Maloney (1929–2018), United States Marine Corps general
- William F. Maloney, economist
- Billy Maloney (1878–1960), American baseball outfielder

== See also ==
- Bill Maloney (born 1958), American businessman and politician
