= Thomas Maloney =

Thomas Maloney may refer to:

- Thomas J. Maloney (judge) (1925–2008), corrupt judge in Illinois, imprisoned 1994–2007
- Thomas J. Maloney (representative), Pennsylvania politician
- Thomas A. Maloney (1889–1986), politician in the state of California
- Thomas Francis Maloney (1903–1962), auxiliary bishop of Providence, Rhode Island

== See also ==
- Thomas Moloney (disambiguation)
