= Federation Bells =

Installation in Melbourne, Australia

Coordinates: 37°49′7″S 144°58′27″E

Federation Bells is an installation comprising 39 upturned bells. Located in Birrarung Marr, Melbourne, they were created for celebrations of the centenary of Australia's federation in 2001. They were designed by Anton Hasell and Neil McLachlan in collaboration with Swaney Draper Architects. To achieve the acoustical tuning of the bells, Behzad Keramati Nigjeh, an aerospace engineer, also cooperated in this project. The bell's vibration modes were modelled and optimised using a sophisticated Finite Element software developed by Dr Joe Tomas.

Federation Bells.com.au allows the public to compose music for Melbourne's Federation Bells. Using an intuitive drag-and-drop timeline, would be composers can create original compositions for the bells and submit them for playing to the curator. During special events the bells are also hooked up to a MIDI keyboard the allow passersby to play the bells in real time.

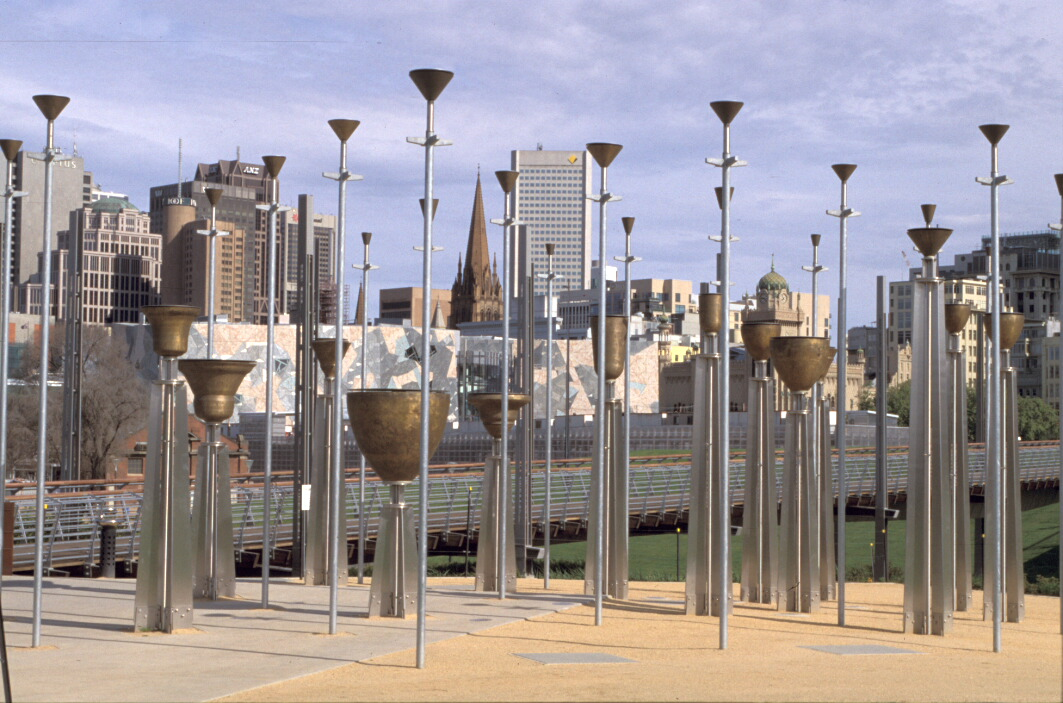
The 'Federation Bells'

== Location ==
The Federation Bells are located on the middle terrace of Birrarung Marr, Melbourne's newest park. They play several times daily: between 8 and 9 am, 12.30–1.30 and 5–6 pm. At 5 am they play a slow set of sequences and evaluate and log their performance based on analysis of the sound.

== History ==
The State Government of Victoria, through the Melbourne festival, commissioned the Federation Bell project in 1998. They were located as a central feature in Birrarung Marr, a new Melbourne parkland located alongside the Yarra River, between Federation Square and Melbourne's sporting precinct. Both the Federation Bells and Birrarung Marr were opened on 26 January 2002. Sir Gustav Nossal launched the installation and the Federation Bells played seven Australian pieces commissioned especially for the Federation Bells. The upwardfacing cone design is echoed throughout Melbourne in the conical streetlights that have the same proportions as the steep coned bells.

The original composers and the names of their compositions are:

- Neil McLachlan – "Opening"
- Terry McDermott – "Rhyme"
- Anne Boyd – "St. Donat's Morning Bells"
- Brenton Broadstock – "Jagged Tears"
- Constantine Koukias – "Pentekostarion – Prayer Bells"
- Anne Norman – "Sylvia's Chalice"
- Garth Paine – "Klangfarben"

In 2005 the Federation Bells underwent a structural upgrade to ensure the structural integrity of the poles. In late 2006, the City of Melbourne entered into an agreement with Arts Victoria to manage the Federation Bells for four years. The City of Melbourne plans include expanding the number and range of compositions that are played on the Federation Bells, special events and greater public access.

== Website ==
In late 2007 the City of Melbourne launched FederationBells.com.au, a website that lets its visitors compose music for Melbourne's Federation Bells by using an intuitive drag-and-drop timeline. The compositions can then be heard on the Federation Bells installation in Birrarung Marr. In 2013, the website underwent a complete redesign featuring many new and real-time features.

== Refurbishment ==
In 2010 Spring Innovations was asked to design and build a completely new type of playing system that replaced the original. The novel system mimics the human touch, with a large dynamic range, precise repeatability, swift action (less than 15 milliseconds, repeatable 12 times a second for the small bells) and measurable high reliability. Every day the system plays a test sequence and 'listens' to the result, comparing the sound with standard recordings. It then generates a daily email report that details how well the carillon is functioning. In 2012 The refurbished system was launched on 1 April with live synchronised concerts of music specially composed for the Bells, ranging from Opera, to acoustic, to Rock and Dance. The bells have become an integrated flexible instrument.

== Design ==
The installation is a set of musical bells like a carillon, but dispersed across a small field rather than hidden in a tower. Our primary impetus is that the bells are also sculptural forms to be seen and approached. Being able to see the different shapes and hear how they sound is fundamental to the aural-visual aesthetic of the project and the underlying concept of integrating the various traditional bell forms. Naturally the bells sound very different when one is standing in the middle of the installation to when you are 100 metres away at the edge of the park.

The installation is a public musical instrument. The bells are struck by a variety of hammers controlled by a specially designed smart controller, which in turn plays MIDI compositions. On a daily basis (8–9 am 12.30–1.30 and 5–6 pm) selections of over 200 pieces play, allowing people to wander amongst the bells for an exhilarating experience or sit nearby and enjoy their clear and gentle musicality. While bells were once amongst the loudest sounds people would normally hear, they are now often drowned out by traffic and amplified music. These bells can usually be heard within about 100 metres in the relatively quiet riverside park. The sequencing of the bells uses specially developed musical software and the bell sounds can be downloaded from www.federationbells.com.au, allowing composers from anywhere in the world to write works for the bells and send them as MIDI files over the internet for performance.

== Sources ==
- City of Melbourne, www.federationbells.com.au, September 2007
- City of Melbourne, Federation Bells Management Agreement, 8 August 2006 (unpublished).
- Australian Bell, "Federation Bell Commosions", August 1998
- N. McLachlan, B. Keramati Nigjeh and A. Hasell, "The Design of Bells with Harmonic Overtones", accepted for publication in Journal of the Acoustical Society of America, April 2002.
- N. McLachlan, B. K. Nigjeh, and P. Trivailo, "Application of Modal Analysis to Musical Bell Design", AAS 2002 Conference, Adelaide University, Australia, November 2002.
- Georgina Whitehead, Civilising the City: A History of Melbourne’s Public Gardens. State Library of Victoria, 1997.
