= Deborah Halpern =

Australian sculptor, artist (born 1957)

Deborah Halpern OAM
- Born: 1957 (age 68–69)
- Education: Caulfield Institute of Technology
- Style: Sculpture, mosaic, ceramic

Deborah Halpern OAM (born 1957) is an Australian sculptor, mosaic artist and ceramic artist, notable for her public artworks in Melbourne.

== Life ==
Halpern was born in 1957. Her parents, Sylvia and Arthur Halpern, were ceramists and artists and two of the founding members of Potters cottage in Warrandyte. She began work in ceramics as an apprentice in 1975. She studied painting, printmaking and sculpture at the Caulfield Institute of Technology (now Monash University) in 1979. In 1981 she had her first solo exhibition at the Blackwood Street Gallery and her work was selected to be shown at Meat Market Craft Centre; Gryphon Gallery; apart from having her work showcased at numerous other group exhibitions. She was then represented by the Christine Abrahams Gallery in Melbourne, Victoria, for the next 25 years; and Arthouse Gallery in Sydney, NSW. In 1987–89, she graduated with a Diploma of Visual Arts, from the Gippsland Institute of Advanced Education (now Monash University).

== Work ==
Inspired by the free spirit of Pablo Picasso, and Niki de Saint Phalle, Halpern's famous works include the surreal sculpture Angel, commissioned by the National Gallery of Victoria to stand in the south moat of the gallery, and now relocated to Birrarung Marr and Ophelia commissioned by the Southgate development project and situated in the riverside promenade in front of the main Yarra river entrance. Ophelia was named as the official Face of Melbourne by Tourism Victoria during the 1990s. She did printmaking with master printer Bill Young, which was published by Chrysalis Publishing. In 2006, the National Gallery of Victoria's Ian Potter Gallery at Federation Square held a survey exhibition of Halpern's career to coincide with the relocation of Angel to Birrarung Marr. In 2012 Halpern was invited to participate in the JingAn International Sculpture Project (JISP), in Shanghai, China.

== Notable works ==
- 1987–89 "Angel" (Bicentennial sculpture) at Birrarung Marr (since 2006) formerly at the National Gallery of Victoria moat (1987–2002)
- "Family", at Highpoint Shopping Centre, Maribyrnong
- "Portal to Another Time and Place", at Port Leo Sculpture Park
- "Mr Big", at Northland Shopping Centre
- "Spirit of Enquiry", at Union Court, Australian National University
- "Queen of the Shire" at Shire of Nillumbik
- "Water Creature", 'Big Cat", "Small Cat", at City of Manningham
- "Power of the Community", at Beauty Park, Frankston South, Victoria
- "Dove of Peace", at Luther College, Croydon, Victoria
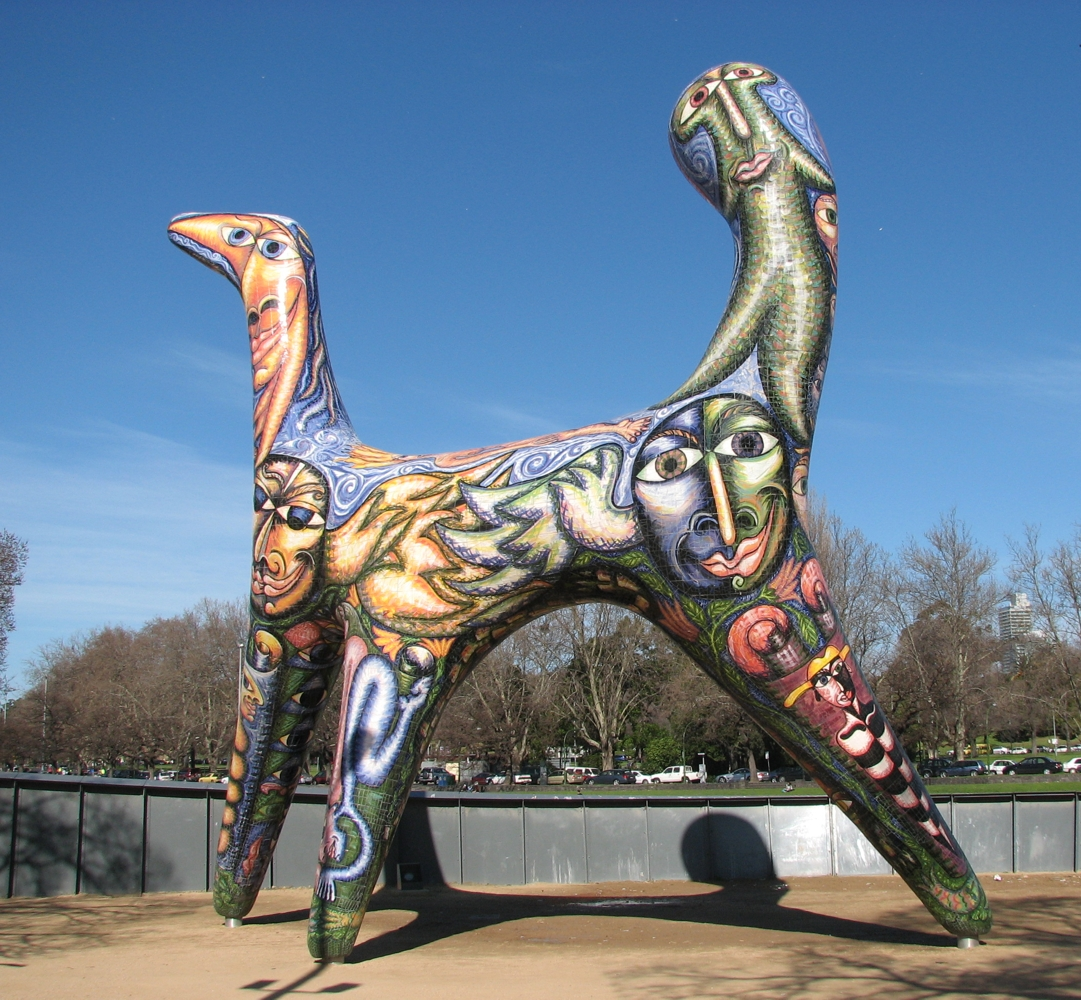
"Angel"

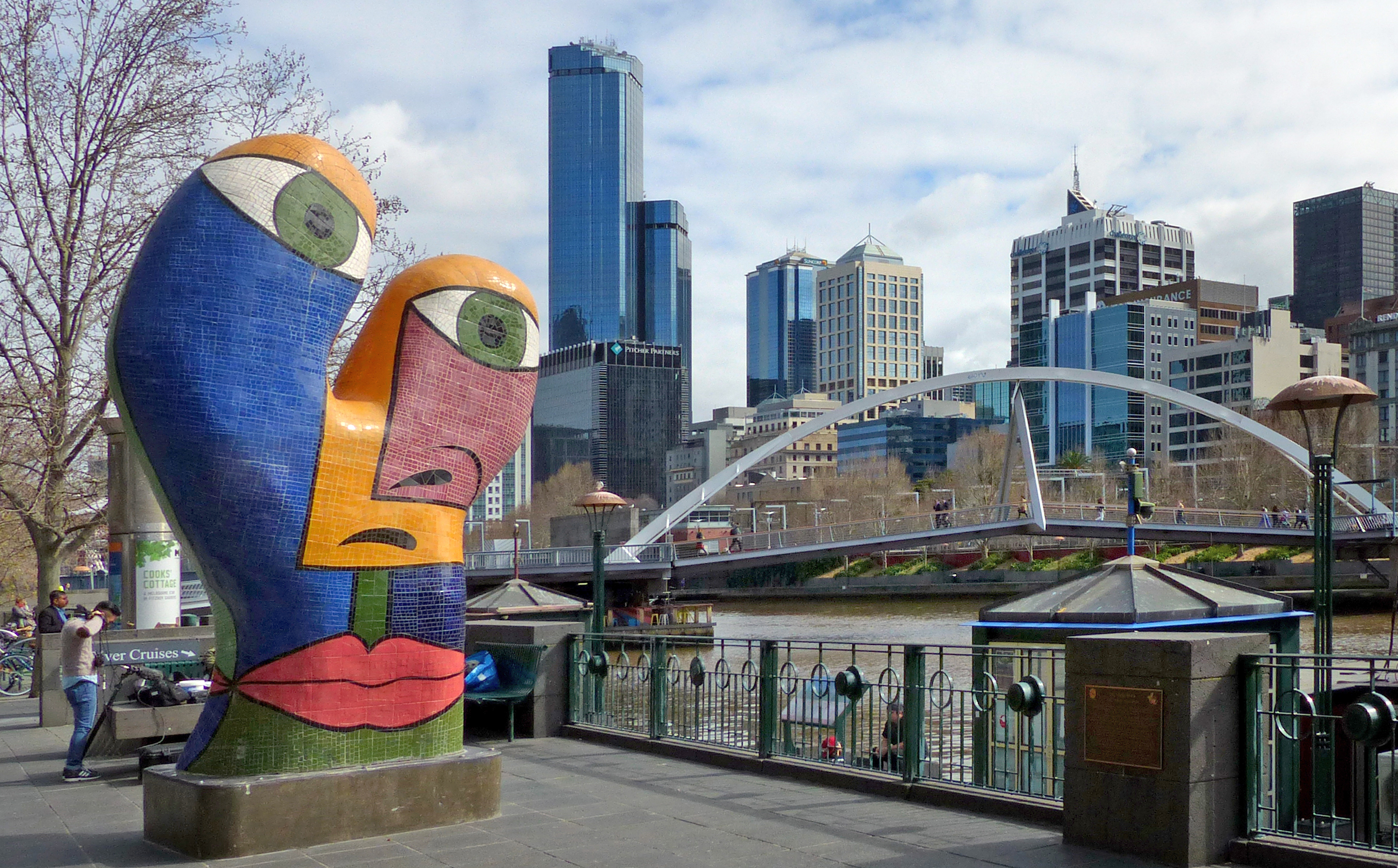
"Ophelia"

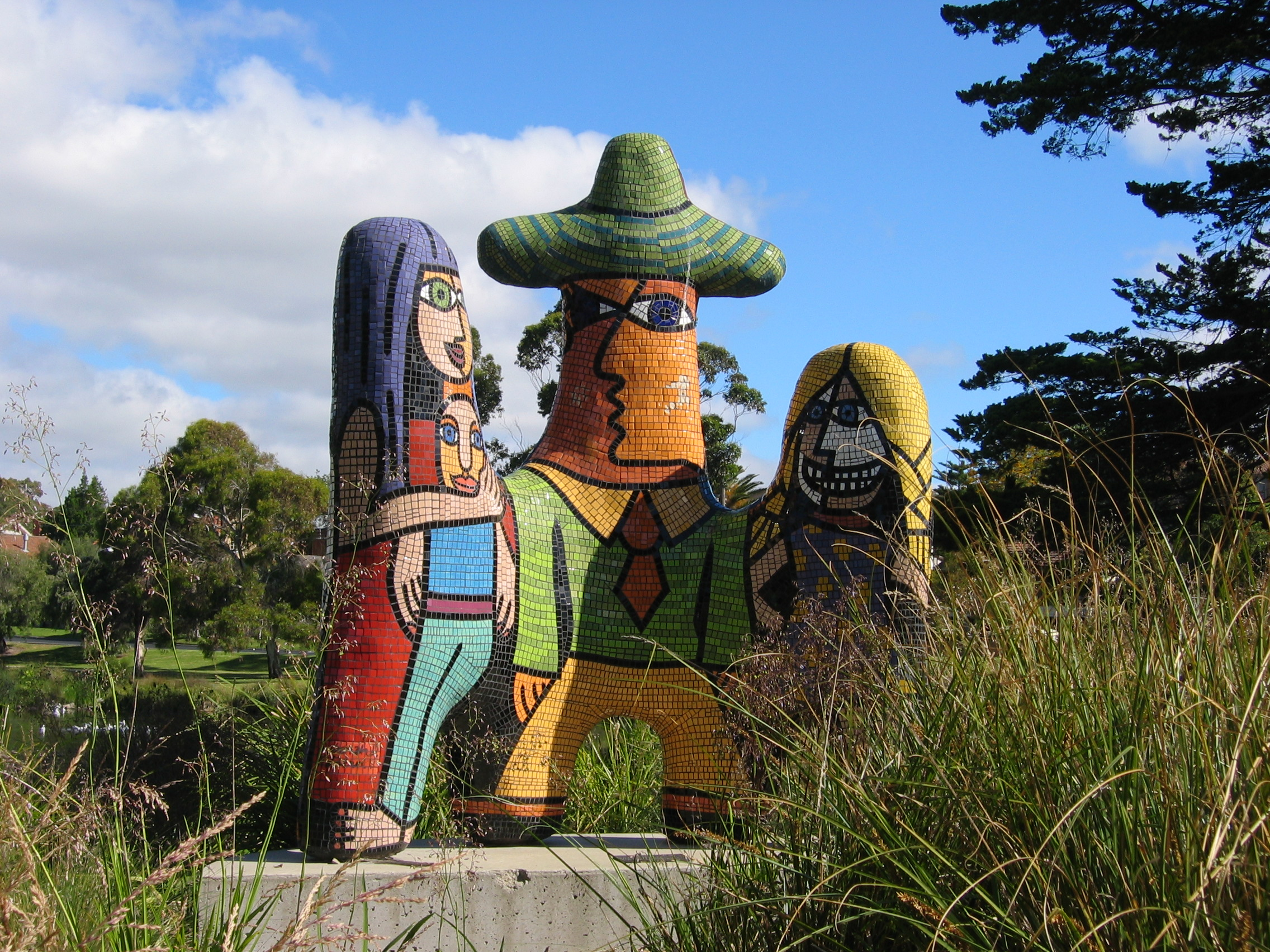
"Power of Community"

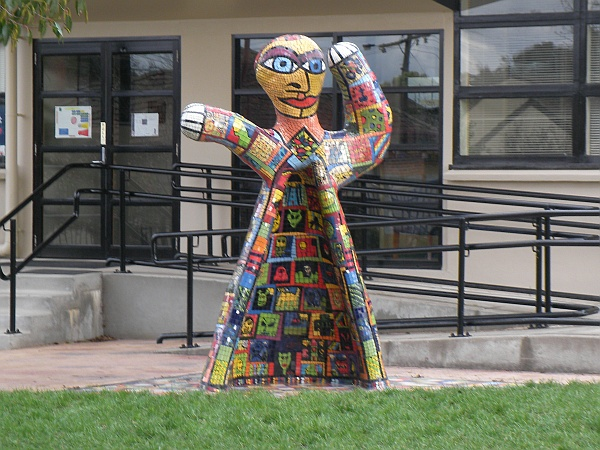
"Beautiful Angel"

== Awards ==
- 1981 Professional Development Grant, Crafts Board, Australia Council
- 1982 Artist in Residence, Croydon Community School, Artists in Schools Program
- 1984 Arts and Crafts Society of Victoria's Fifth Annual Award, Joint Winner Artist in Residence, Narre Warren North Primary, Artists in Schools Program
- 1985 Crafts Board, Australia Council Grant to work and research in France
- 1987 Assistant's Grant, Craft Board, Australia Council
- 1988 The Myer Foundation; The Art Foundation, NGV; The Readymix Group
- 1989 Special Projects Grant, Visual Arts/Craft Board, Australia Council
- 1990 Gold Prize, 'Double Figure', Japan Ass'n for International Garden & Greenery Exposition, Osaka Expo
- 1993 Sidney Myer, Australia Day Ceramic Award, Shepparton Art Gallery
- 1994 Golden Threads Award, Australian Wool Board, Sydney
- 1996 Atom Award for 'Angel' (see Electronic Media section)
- 1996 'Ophelia', the sculpture at Southgate, is chosen to become the new face of Melbourne
- 2005 Highly Commended Award, The Helen Lempriere National Sculpture Award, Werribee Park, Victoria
- 2021 Medal of the Order of Australia, "for service to the arts", Queen's Birthday Honours
