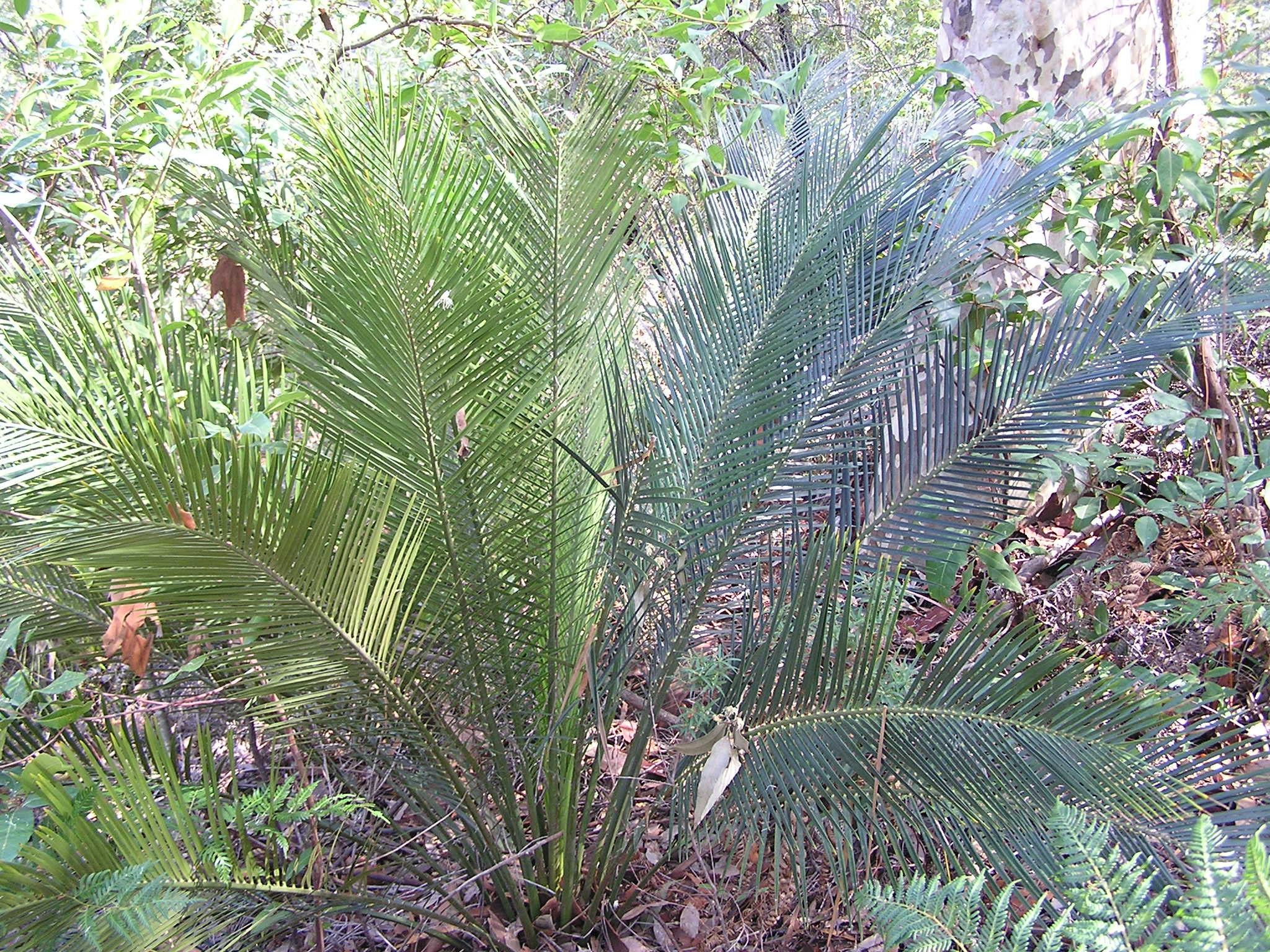
- Macrozamia communis
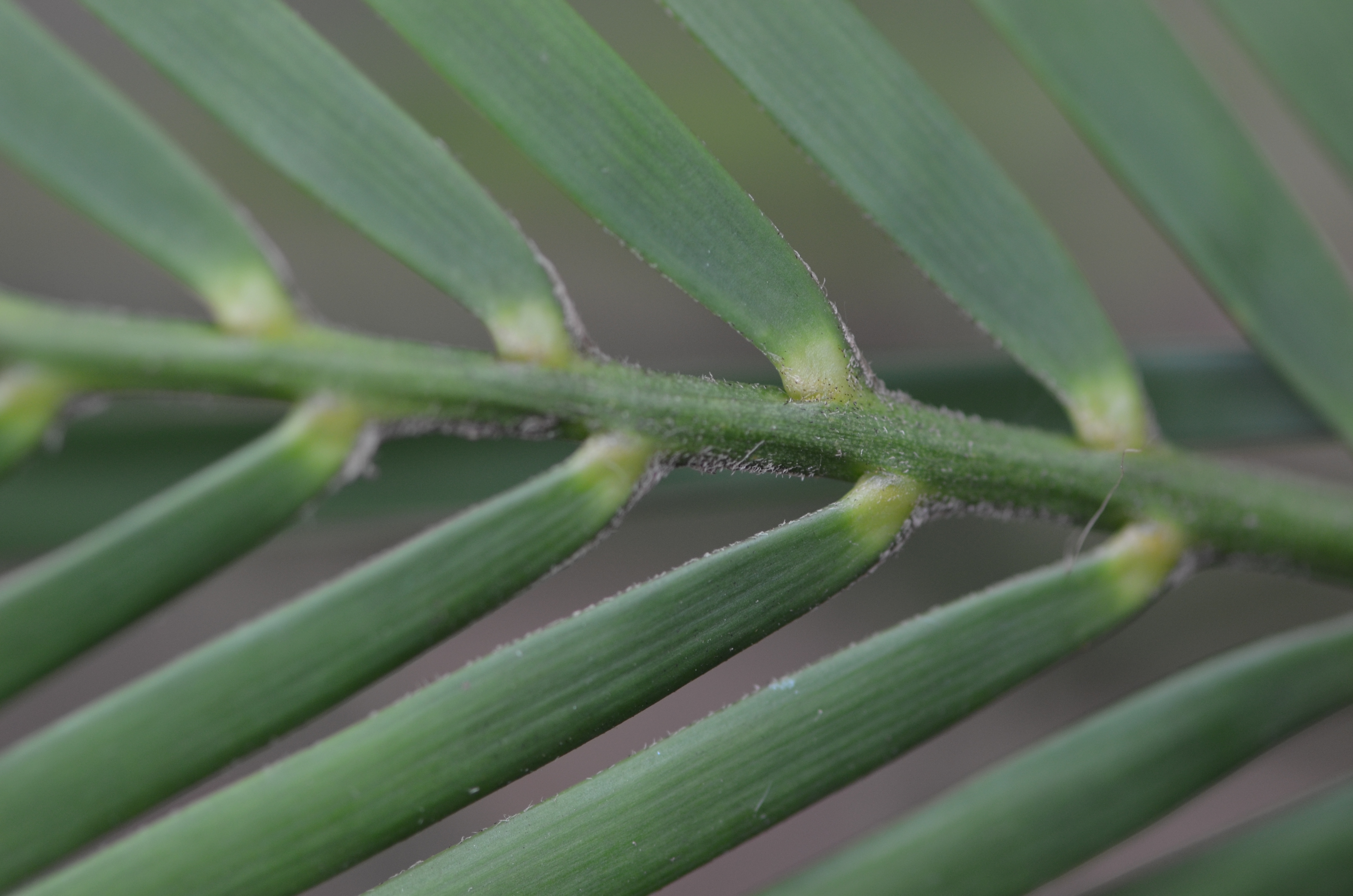
- Showing lack of veins in the pinnae, and yellowish colour at the attachment

Conservation status
- Least Concern (IUCN 3.1)

Scientific classification
- Kingdom: Plantae
- Clade: Tracheophytes
- Clade: Gymnospermae
- Division: Cycadophyta
- Class: Cycadopsida
- Order: Cycadales
- Family: Zamiaceae
- Genus: Macrozamia
- Species: M. communis

Binomial name
- Macrozamia communis L.A.S.Johnson, 1959
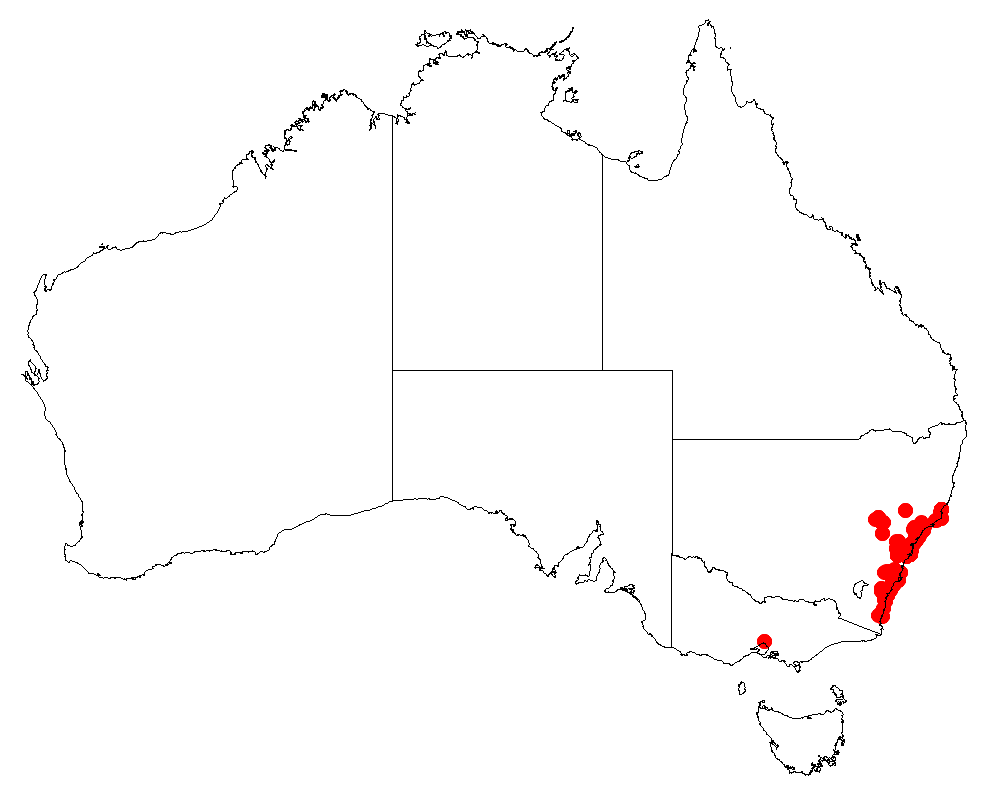
- Occurrence data from AVH

= Macrozamia communis =

Species of cycad

Macrozamia communis is an Australian cycad found on the east coast of New South Wales. The common name for the species is burrawang, a word derived from the Daruk Australian Aboriginal language; this name is also often applied to other species of Macrozamia.

The burrawang has the most extensive distribution of any cycad in New South Wales and is found along the coast from the district around Armidale, New South Wales to Bega 700 km south and on the coastal slopes of the Great Dividing Range with some instances on the inland slopes of the range; as far west as the Mudgee district. It is most abundant on the south coast of the state.

The plants grow in open forests.

Seed cones are formed after fire. Male and female seed cones are on separate plants and the large female seeds are ripe when red or yellow.

Individual specimens take 10–20 years to mature and may live for up to 120 years.

Seedlings of Macrozamia communis have a tuber and coralloid roots that rise up above the ground containing cyanobacteria. These exist in a symbiotic relationship with the cycad by nitrogen fixation. In maturity, the roots contract, pulling the top of the stem level with the ground, while the tuber becomes as much as 1.8 metres (5 ft 11 in) thick, the largest tuber of any cycad.

The seeds of the burrawang are a good source of starch but are poisonous to eat unless treated. The Cadigal people pounded and soaked the seeds in water for a week, changing the water daily. The pulp was then made into cakes and roasted over hot embers.

The conservation status of the species is "not considered to be at risk". The plant has been planted as an ornamental in California.

== Gallery ==
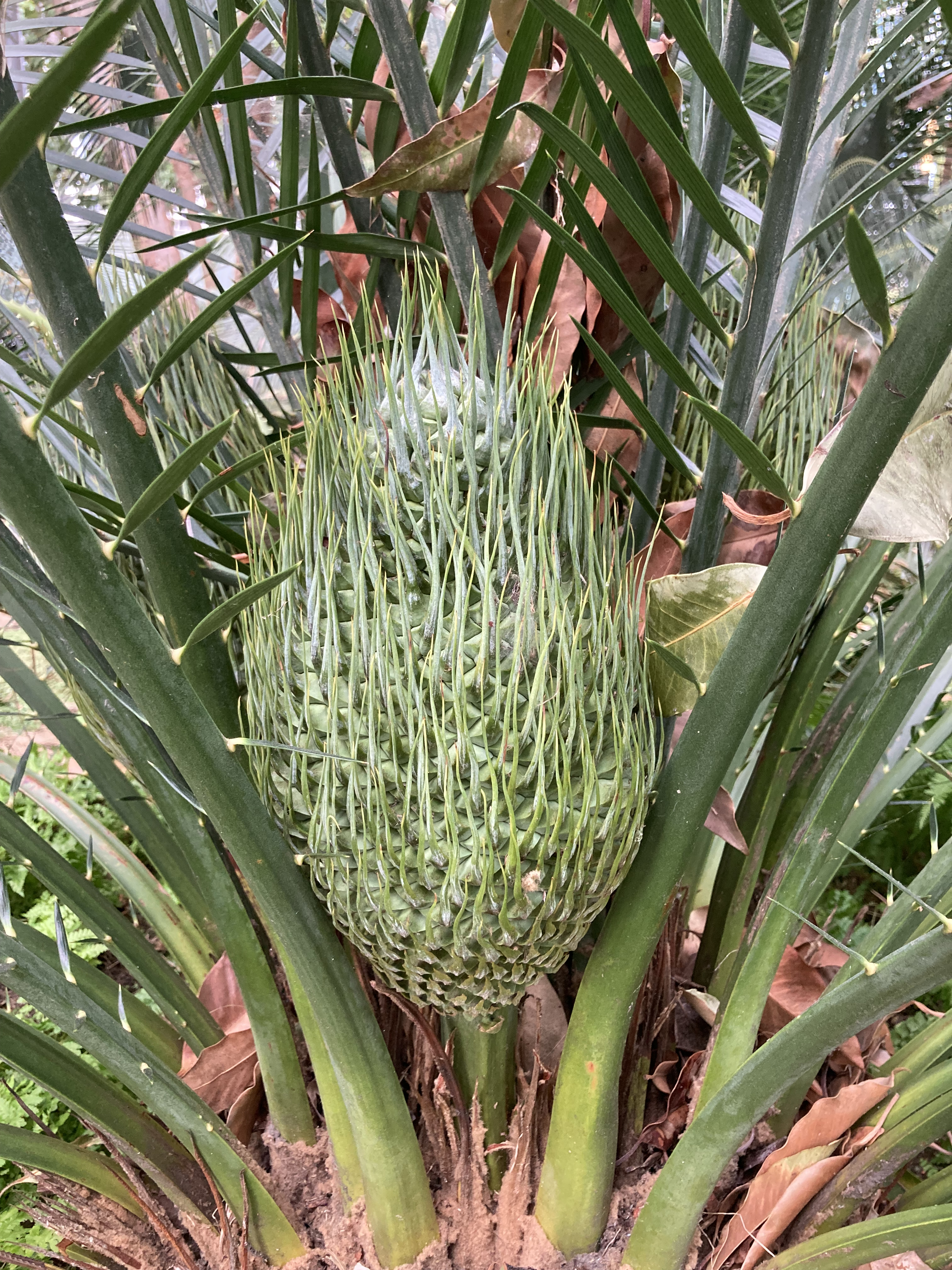
Macrozamia communis cone at Salesforce park.

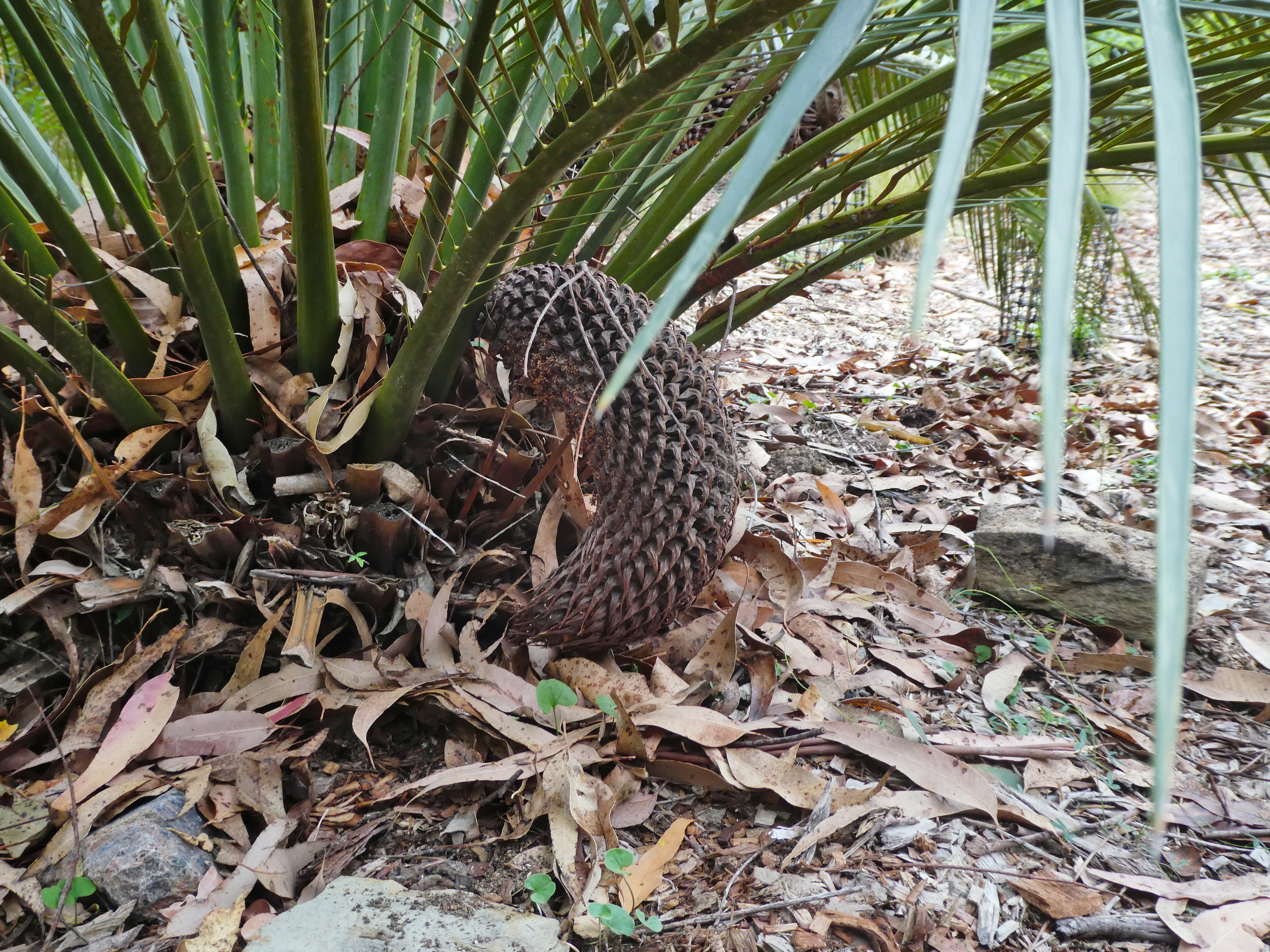
Burrawang in the wild.

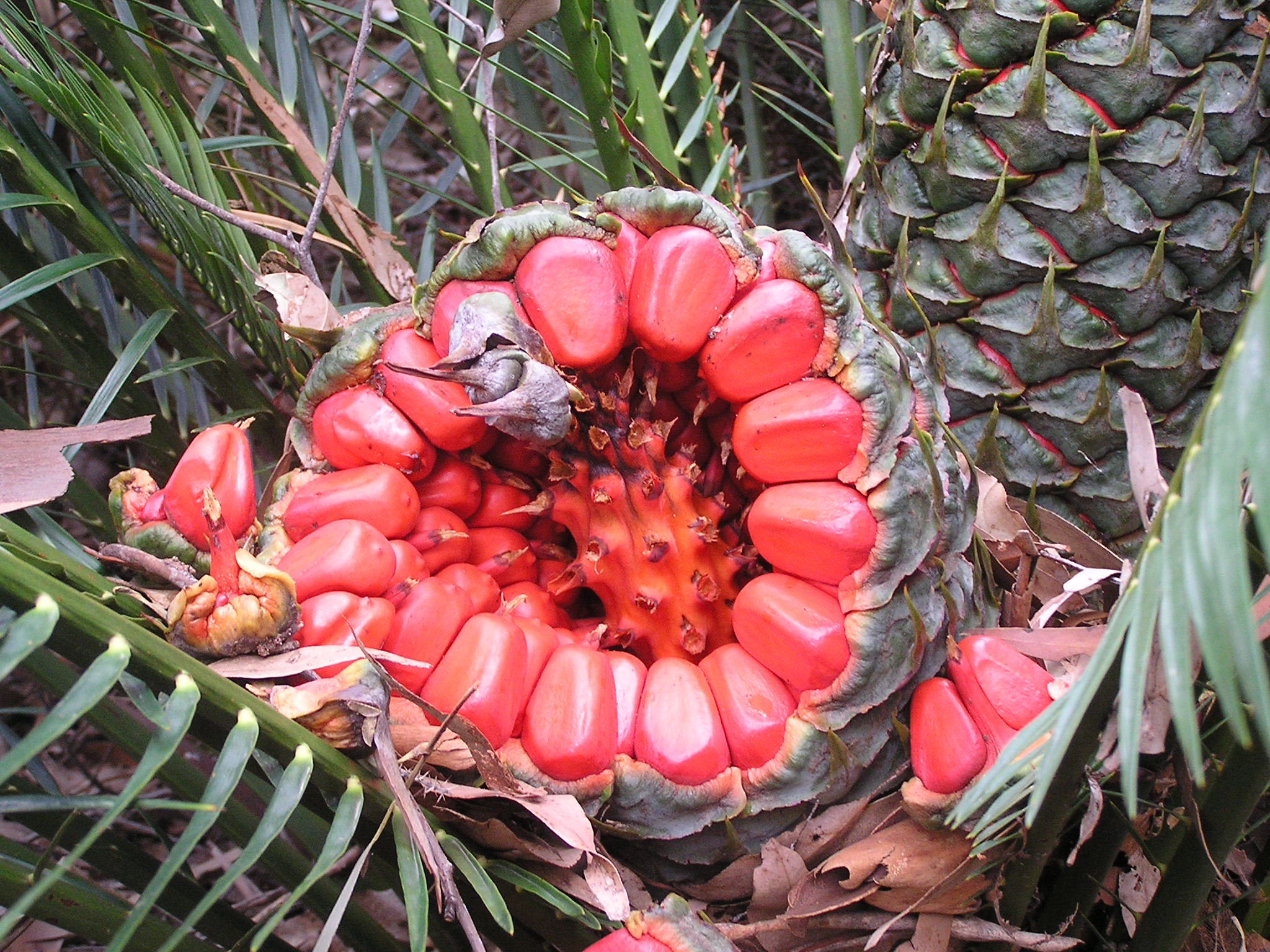
Burrawang seeds, Batemans Bay, New South Wales, Australia
