= Christopher Maloney (disambiguation) =

Christopher Maloney or Chris Maloney may refer to:

- Christopher Maloney (born 1969), American singer-songwriter
- Chris Maloney (born 1961), American baseball coach
- Christopher Maloney (English singer) (born 1977)

== See also ==
- Christopher Meloni (born 1961), American actor
- Chris Malone (born 1978), Australian rugby union coach
- Christopher Malone (born 1990), Scottish footballer
