= Martin Maloney =

Martin Maloney may refer to:

- Martin Maloney (artist), English artist
- Martin Maloney (philanthropist), Philadelphia businessman, philanthropist and papal marquis
- Martin James Maloney, member of the House of Commons of Canada
