= Marv Maloney =

American politician

Member of the U.S. House of Representatives from Missouri's 45th district

Missouri House of Representatives

Personal details
- Born: 1942 Pleasant Hill, Missouri, US
- Died: 2011 (aged 68–69)
- Party: Democratic
- Spouse: Dorine R. Brening
- Children: 2 daughters
- Occupation: private attorney

Marvin L. "Marv" Maloney (March 6, 1942 – August 21, 2011) was an American Democratic politician who served in the Missouri House of Representatives. He was born in Pleasant Hill, Missouri, and was educated at Smithton High School and at William Jewell College in Liberty, Missouri. On June 3, 1962, he married Dorine R. Brening in Warrensburg, Missouri. In later life, he lived near Pittsburg, Texas.
