= Tom Moloney (businessman) =

Tom Moloney (born 1960) was the CEO of Emap where he headed a multi-billion pound media empire. After working there for 26 years he was ousted in 2007 by the board of directors after a decline in advertising revenue. As of 2008 he works for healthcare information publisher Dr Foster Intelligence (DFI) in the same position.
