= Reilly & Maloney =

Reilly & Maloney was an American folk music duo that were formed in the 1970s, composed of Ginny Reilly and David Maloney. Based in Seattle and in the San Francisco Bay Area, they performed for two decades. They toured nationally, appearing with artists such as Judy Collins and Tom Paxton. Together they issued seven vinyl LPs, before breaking up in the late 1980s and each going on to solo careers.

They began playing together again in the early 2000s, after a ten-year hiatus. 2016 was their "45th Anniversary Farewell Tour", ending on December 11 with a concert at the Tim Noah Thumbnail Theater in Snohomish, Washington.

Dave Maloney died on March 10, 2023.

== Discography ==
=== Reilly & Maloney ===
Date	Title	Format
1976	at last	LP
1978	alive (live)	LP
1979	Good Company	LP
1980	Everyday	LP
1983	Profiles	LP
2000	A Collection	CD
2003	Together Again	CD
2004	Backstage (live, 1986)	CD
2005	Reilly & Maloney Concert (live, 1988)	DVD
2005	at last & alive	CD
2006	Hello My Heart: Collection II	CD
2008	brighter light: a tribute to Tom Dundee	CD
2012	A Christmas Album	CD

=== Ginny Reilly ===
DATE	TITLE	FORMAT
1988	Doodle Lee Do'n	CD & LP
2005	Oh, Reilly!	CD
2013	the Blues of BESSIE SMITH	CD

=== David Maloney ===
DATE	TITLE	FORMAT
1981	The Harvest Is In	LP
1985	Listen to the Pipes	LP
1989	One Voice	CD & Cassette
1990	I'm Glad I'm a Kid!	Cassette
1993	An Ordinary Day	CD & Cassette
1996	Goin' to Town...	CD
1996	"Angels Bending Near the Earth": A Christmas Album	CD
2002	My Big Green Hat	CD
2006	One Voice (1989) & An Ordinary Day (1993)	2 CDs
2010	One Day More	CD
2013	Davy Joe Malone ...a little homespun wobble	CD
