= William F. Maloney =

Chief economist for Latin America and Caribbean region in World Bank Group

William F. Maloney is chief economist for the Latin America and Caribbean region in the World Bank Group. Previously he was chief economist for Equitable Growth, Finance and Institutions, and Trade and Competitiveness; he was also Global Lead on Innovation and Productivity. Prior to the Bank, he was an assistant professor of economics at the University of Illinois, Urbana-Champaign (1990–1997) and then Lead Economist in the Office of the Chief Economist for Latin America until 2009. From 2009 to 2014, he was Lead Economist in the Development Economics Research Group. From 2011 to 2014, he was visiting professor at the University of the Andes and worked closely with the Colombian government on innovation and firm upgrading issues.

Maloney received his PhD in economics from the University of California Berkeley (1990), his BA from Harvard University (1981), and he studied at the University of the Andes in Bogota, Colombia (1982–83).

He has published in general academic journals on issues related to international trade and finance, developing country labor markets, and innovation and growth including The Review of Economic Studies, American Economic Review: Insights, The Review of Economics and Statistics, The Economic Journal, and The Journal of the European Economic Association as well as the leading field journals in development and trade. He has also written several flagship publications of the Latin American division of the Bank, including Informality: Exit and Exclusion; Natural Resources: Neither Curse nor Destiny and Lessons from NAFTA, Does What you Export Matter: In Search of Empirical Guidance for Industrial Policy.

As part of the World Bank Productivity Project that he directs he published The Innovation Paradox: Developing Country Capabilities the Unrealized Potential of Technological Catch-Up, Harvesting Prosperity: Technology and Productivity Growth in Agriculture as well as Place, Productivity, and Prosperity: Spatially Targeted Policies for Regional Development.

His work has been referenced in the New York Times, the Financial Times, The Economist as well as in press throughout Latin America and Asia. He has appeared on CNN en Español, National Public Radio, Vietnamese National Television among other venues. According to Research Papers in Economics (RePec), Maloney is ranked among the top 10% of economists worldwide, based on publications and scholarly citations.
