= Mike Moloney (Gaelic footballer) =

Irish Gaelic footballer

Michael Moloney
Personal information
- Native name: Micheál Ó Maoldomhnaigh (Irish)
- Born: 7 January 1988 (age 38) Killarney, Republic of Ireland

Sport
- Sport: Gaelic Football
- Position: Full Back
Club
- Years: Club
- 2005-: Dr Crokes
Club titles
- Kerry titles: 6
- Munster titles: 2
- All-Ireland Titles: 1
Inter-county
Years	County	Apps (scores)
2011	London	3 (0-0)

Mike Moloney is a Gaelic footballer from Killarney, County Kerry. He plays with the Dr Crokes club and the Kerry intercounty team.

He won a Munster Minor Championship medal in 2006 and played in the All Ireland final with Kerry lost out to Roscommon. In 2008, he was full back on the Kerry team that won the All Ireland Under 21 title. In 2011 he was part of the London team that picked up their first championship win since the 1970s.

With Dr Crokes he won a County Championship medal in 2010 and a Munster Championship in 2006 and played in the 2007 All Ireland Club final. In London, he played with the Kingdom Kerry Gaels club.
