= Rama Subbaiah =

Indian politician (1908-1997)

Member of Tamil Nadu Legislative Council
- In office 20 April 1972 – 19 April 1978
- Chairmen: C. P. Chitrarasu (1970-76); M. P. Sivagnanam (1976-86)

Personal details
- Born: 14 November 1908 Arimalam, Pudukkottai State, British India (now in Tamil Nadu, India)
- Died: 21 May 1997 (aged 88) Tamil Nadu, India
- Party: Dravida Munnettra Kazhagam (1949-1997; his death)
- Other political affiliations: Self Respect Movement (1930-1944); Dravidar Kazhagam (1944-1949)
- Spouse: Visalatchi (m. 1933; d. 1987)
- Children: Lenin (1934-38/39); S. P. Muthuraman (1935-); Kanagalakshmi (1936-); Selvamani (1939-); Indhira (1942-74); Swaminathan (1946-); Suba Veerapandian (1952-)
- Parent: Pazhaniyappan (father)
- Occupation: Social activist Politician

Karaikudi Rama Subbaiah (14 November 1908 - 21 May 1997) was an Indian politician and a forerunner of the Dravidian movement. He served as a member of the erstwhile Tamil Nadu Legislative Council from 1972 to 1978.

== Early life ==
Subbaiah was born on 14 November 1908 in a Nattukottai Nagarathar family in Arimalam (in Pudukkottai district). Despite his family's religiousness, he was attracted by the rationalist thoughts of "Periyar" E.V. Ramasamy, to whom he got introduced during 1924–25.

== Politics ==
=== Self-Respect Movement (1930-44) ===
Subbaiah joined the Self-Respect Movement in 1930 and was instrumental in developing the movement in Karaikudi region. He became a close confidant of Tamil poet Bharathidasan, who had joined the Self-Respect movement the same time as he did. Others who were close to Subbaiah's family included Kunjitham Gurusamy, Pattukkottai Alagiri, N. D. Sundaravadivelu, Moovalur Ramamirtham and Poovalur Ponnambalanar.

In the 1930s Subbaiah successfully conducted "Adi Dravidar Welfare Conference". He also gained the friendship of communist icons like M. Singaravelu, P. Jeevanandham and P. Ramamurthi. In 1935, Singaravelu suggested that Subbaiah name his house as "சமதர்ம விலாஸ்" (translit. "camatarma vilās"; meaning "Socialist Villa"), and even provided a marble plaque with the name etched on it. From that point, some of Subbaiah's friends called him as "Samadharmam Subbaiah".

In 1932, amidst much opposition, Subbaiah conducted "Ramanathapuram district's "Self-Respect Movement Conference" in Karaikudi.

During the 1937-40 Anti-Hindi agitation, Subbaiah mobilized hundreds of people into participating, though he himself did not partake (Periyar advised him not to get arrested but to strengthen the agitations as an outside participant).

On 27 December 1938, the Self-Respect movement held the Madras Province's fourth "Tamils Conference", during which 28 people got elected as members of the organisation's state working committee. Subbaiah was one of them, along with two others from Ramanathapuram - namely M. Kasi Viswanatham and W. P. A. Soundarapandian.

=== Dravidar Kazhagam (1944-49) ===
Subbaiah stayed with the Self-Respect movement as it metamorphosed into the Dravidar Kazhagam (DK) on 27 August 1944. The DK held its first state conference (called "Blackshirt Conference") in Madurai during 11–12 May 1946. On 12 May, some miscreants set fire to the conference pandal set up in the sandy banks of Vaigai River, as part of a few other violent incidents (which the DK later claimed happened at the behest of A. Vaidyanatha Iyer). Following the chaos, Subbaiah, K. Anbazhagan and a few other participants fled Madurai. After crossing Manamadurai and Thirukoshtiyur, they reached Karaikudi. On 14 May, Subbaiah arranged a meeting in a village near Karaikudi. There too, some unidentified people pelted stones.

=== Dravida Munnetra Kazhagam (1949-97) ===
Subbaiah left the DK in 1949 along with C.N. Annadurai as the latter had differences with Periyar. Subbaiah joined Annadurai's new party Dravida Munnetra Kazhagam (DMK). He then gained the friendship of M. Karunanidhi, then a second rung leader in the party. Karunanidhi introduced poet Kannadasan to Subbaiah.

Subbaiah also played an important role in drawing many youth to the DMK in the Karaikudi region. Those mentored by him include R. M. Veerappan (later founder of MGR Kazhagam) and poet Sami Palaniappan (Tamil lyricist Palani Bharathi's father).

In 1953, Subbaiah became involved in the protests against the Rajagopalachari government's Modified Scheme of Elementary education, a short-lived initiative that gained notoriety as the "Kula kalvi thittam (Hereditary/Caste Education Scheme)". Around the same time, he led the second batch of protesters against the renaming of Kallakudi as Dalmiapuram, the first and third batch being led by Karunanidhi and Kannadasan respectively. He was arrested and sentenced to three months of imprisonment at Tiruchirappalli Central Prison. Karunanidhi was among his prison-mates. After release, Subbaiah became a member of the DMK's general council. In the 1957 Madras Assembly election, he unsuccessfully contested against M. A. Muthiah Chettiar (of the INC) in Karaikudi constituency.

On 20 April 1972, Subbaiah was appointed by Karunanidhi (then Chief Minister of Tamil Nadu) as a member of Tamil Nadu Legislative Council (MLC). He served in that position till 19 April 1978.

== Personal life ==
Subbaiah married Visalatchi, who was also a member of the Self Respect Movement since 1930. They had seven children. Owing to his interest in socialist ideals, Subbaiah named his eldest child (b. 17 January 1934) after Lenin. The boy died of fever when he was just four or five years old. Indhira (Subbaiah's daughter; b. September 1942) too died early aged 32, leaving behind two sons. Visalatchi died on 19 September 1987 due to chronic diabetes. Selvamani (b.1939), one of Subbaiah's sons, died sometime between 2015 and 2024.

As of 2025, four children of Subbaiah were alive: Tamil film director S. P. Muthuraman (b.1935), Kanagalaksmi (b. December 1936), Swaminathan (b.1946) and Dravidian ideologue Suba Veerapandian aka Subavee.(b.1952).

== Death ==
Subbaiah died at 17:00 IST on 21 May 1997. His body was first garlanded by the then Chief Minister Karunanidhi as per the former's wish. Later, the body was cremated without any orthodox Hindu rituals as per Subavee's suggestions. As a defiance of customs, women too participated in the funeral. Advocate and Dravidian ideologue Arulmozhi delivered the condolence speech. Tamil scholar "Silamboli" Su. Chellappan was present among the mourners.

== Legacy ==
In 1985, Subbaiah's biography titled நானும் என் திராவிட இயக்க நினைவுகளும் [translit.Nāṉum eṉ Tirāviṭa Iyakka niṉaivukaḷum; meaning Me and my Dravidian Movement Memories] came out after being edited by Subavee. Kanimuthup Pathipagam (Chennai) was the publisher. It was launched by Karunanidhi (then an MLC) at Periyar Thidal.

Translation of Subavee's preface to Nāṉum eṉ Tirāviṭa Iyakka niṉaivukaḷum

"Dear Father,

I have some reasons for pride.

That I'm your child is the chief one among them.

You are the eldest in our house;

You're the last child too!

I still remember your shoulders that lifted me towards the thinnai pallikkoodam.

I have a regret that you have not beaten me since the day I remember.

Had it not been for mother's sternness, waves would have gone astray.

I have often heard my mother tell stories of you disappearing and returning home five or six months later.

It is because of the work you have done that all of us children are well today.

You plucked [fruits]; we quenched our appetites.

You walked; we rested.

Few are the days in which I saw money in your pockets. You never hid wealth in a box.

My little pen could not measure the 78-year-journey of your feet.

But still

It was only when I finished writing this book that a meaning came to my writing skill.

As I have written this book in colloquial tongue just as you spoke to me, I have recorded in it not only your opinions, but also your voice.

Your opinion, your work, your voice, your appearance, your handwriting can all be seen in this book.

I have been careful not to let any of my opinion and language style come in.

It is a shortfall that old photos and letters could not be added more. This shortfall will vanish in the next edition !

I will always be thankful to Mr. Subasundaram and Mr. Govindan who helped me [to write this book] upon mentioning your name.

This book

We think is a property you and Mother are leaving to us.

Love,

- Suba Veerapandian "

" Have you ever seen the miraculous sight of 'Toil' taking a shape and working [enthusiastically]? If you haven't seen it, see Rama Subbaiah!...

...The one with a motherly heart, the one who speaks so [eloquently] that even a diabolic heart may be moved. He has impressed not only me, but the frontline warriors of the movement, not today or yesterday, but [since the very beginning]...

The force under his command fought a virtuous battle just like us on the field and was captured by the ruling class. "

— M.Karunanidhi, writing about Subbaiah in his autobiography Nenjukku Needhi

Karunanidhi held the birth centenary celebration of Subbaiah on 10 May 2008, during his fifth term as Chief Minister. The event was held at Kalaivanar Arangam in Chennai.

In a statement dated 8 September 2021, Dravidar Kazhagam president K.Veeramani requested Chief Minister M.K.Stalin to name a proposed college in Karaikudi after Subbaiah.
