= Anti-Hindi agitation of 1937–1940 =

Protests in Madras, British India

1937–40 Anti-Hindi agitations of Madras
- Part of Anti-Hindi agitations of Tamil Nadu
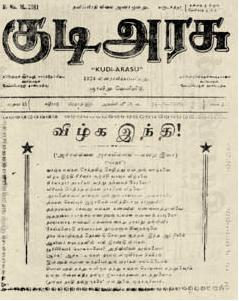
- Front page of Periyar E. V. Ramasamy's periodical Kudiyarasu (3 September 1939). The headline reads "Veezhga Indhi" (Down with Hindi)
- Date: 11 August 1937 - 21 February 1940 (2 years, 6 months and 11 days)
- Location: Tamil-speaking areas of Madras Province, British Raj (present-day Tamil Nadu, India)
- Caused by: A policy statement and a government order (G.O) issued by the Madras Provincial Government to make the teaching of Hindi language compulsory in secondary schools
- Goals: To make the government withdraw the order
- Methods: Non-violent - Conferences, fasts, marching, picketing, rallying; Violent - Riots, Stone throwing
- Result: Resignation of the Government (1939); Withdrawal of the order by Madras Governor Lord Erskine (1940)

Parties
Electoral parties Justice Party All-India Muslim League; Communist Party of India (partially) Non-electoral organizations Self-Respect Movement; Tamilar Padai (rallying); Karanthai Tamil Sangam Tamil scholars, Saivite scholars, industrialists and general public	Government of Madras (1937-39): Madras Police; Electoral parties Indian National Congress (partially); Communist Party of India (partially) Non-electoral organizations * Hindustani Seva Dal * Hindustani Hitashi Sabha

Lead figures
A. T. Panneerselvam; M. A. Muthiah Chettiar; N. V. Natarajan P. Khalifulla Sahib M. Singaravelu: "Periyar" E. V. Ramasamy; C. N. Annadurai; Moovalur Ramamirtham; S. Dharmambal; Pattukkottai Alagiri; Meenambal Shivaraj; Rama Subbaiah; M. S. Purnalingam; Maraimalai Adigal; Somasundara Bharathiar; T. V. Umamaheswaran; K. A. P. Viswanatham; K. Appadurai; Sivananda Adigal; K. Vellaivaarananaar; Kanchi Manimozhiar; K. M. Annal Thango; K. M. Balasubramaniam; S. Ilakkuvanar; Mudiyarasan; W. P. A. Soundarapandian; G. D. Naidu; Karumuttu Thiagarajar; L. Natarajan †; Thalamuthu †; Palladam Ponnusamy; Stalin Jagadeesan; Pulavar K. Govindan; N. Sankaraiah; M. Karunanidhi; Nagore E. M. Hanifa	C. Rajagopalachari P. Subbarayan T. S. S. Rajan S. Satyamurti P. Jeevanandham

Casualties
- Deaths: 2 (Natarajan and Thalamuthu)
- Arrested: 1,198
- Detained: Periyar (1 year; released in 6 months); Annadurai (4 months); Palladam Ponnusamy (6 weeks)
- Fined: Periyar fined ₹.1,000
- † = died in detainment

The anti-Hindi imposition agitation of 1937–1940 refers to a series of protests that happened in Madras Province of British India during 1937–1940. It was launched in 1937 in opposition to the introduction of compulsory teaching of Hindi in the schools of the province by the Indian National Congress government led by C. Rajagopalachari (Rajaji). This move was immediately opposed by E. V. Ramasamy (Periyar) and the opposition Justice Party (later Dravidar Kazhagam). The agitation, which lasted for about 30 months, was multifaceted and involved fasts, conferences, marches, picketing and protests. The government responded with a crackdown resulting in the death of two protesters and the arrest of 1,198 persons including women and children. The mandatory Hindi education was later withdrawn by the British governor of Madras Lord Erskine in February 1940 after the resignation of the Congress government in 1939.

== Background ==
The Republic of India has hundreds of languages. According to the Census of 2001, there are 1,635 rationalized mother tongues and 122 languages with more than 10,000 speakers. During the British Raj, English was the official language. When the Indian Independence Movement gained momentum in the early part of the 20th century, efforts were undertaken to make Hindustani as a common language to unite various linguistic groups against the British Government. As early as 1918, Mahatma Gandhi established the Dakshin Bharat Hindi Prachar Sabha (Institution for the Propagation of Hindi in South India). In 1925, the Indian National Congress switched to Hindustani from English for conducting its proceedings. Both Gandhi and Jawaharlal Nehru were supporters of Hindustani and Congress wanted to propagate the learning of Hindustani in non-Hindi speaking Provinces of India. The idea of making Hindustani or Hindi the common language was not acceptable to Periyar, who viewed it as an attempt to make Tamils subordinate to North Indians.

The Indian National Congress won the 1937 elections in Madras Province. Rajaji became the Chief Minister on 14 July 1937. He was a supporter of propagating Hindi in South India. Even before the elections, he had expressed support for Hindi in a newspaper article (Sudesamithran, 6 May 1937): "Government employment is limited. All cannot get it. Therefore one has to search for other jobs. For that and for business, knowledge of Hindi is necessary. Only if we learn Hindi, the south Indian can gain respect among the others." On 11 August 1937, within a month of coming to power, he announced his intention to introduce Hindi language teaching in secondary schools by issuing a policy statement. This move followed lobbying by pro-Hindi organisations like Hindustani Seva Dal and Hindustani Hitashi Sabha. These organisations had earlier convinced many Justice Party led local governments to introduce compulsory Hindi in schools in the early 1930s. Periyar and the opposition Justice Party led by A. T. Panneerselvam immediately opposed the move. An Anti-Hindi conference was organised on 4 October 1937 to protest the announcement. On 21 April 1938, Rajaji went ahead and passed a government order (G.O) making the teaching of Hindi compulsory in 125 Secondary schools in the Province. Rajaji's persistence was viewed by Hindi's opponents as an attempt to destroy Tamil and promote Hindi. They started statewide protests against Rajaji and Hindi. The agitation was marked by protest marches, anti-Hindi conferences, observing an anti-Hindi day (1 July and 3 December 1938), fasts against government policies, black flag demonstrations and picketing of government offices and institutions. It was active in Tamil speaking districts of the Province - Ramnad, Tirunelveli, Salem, Tanjore and North Arcot. The agitation lasted till the order was withdrawn in February 1940. Two persons -Natarajan and Thalamuthu- lost their lives. Around 1,200 people including Periyar were imprisoned.

== Support for the agitation ==
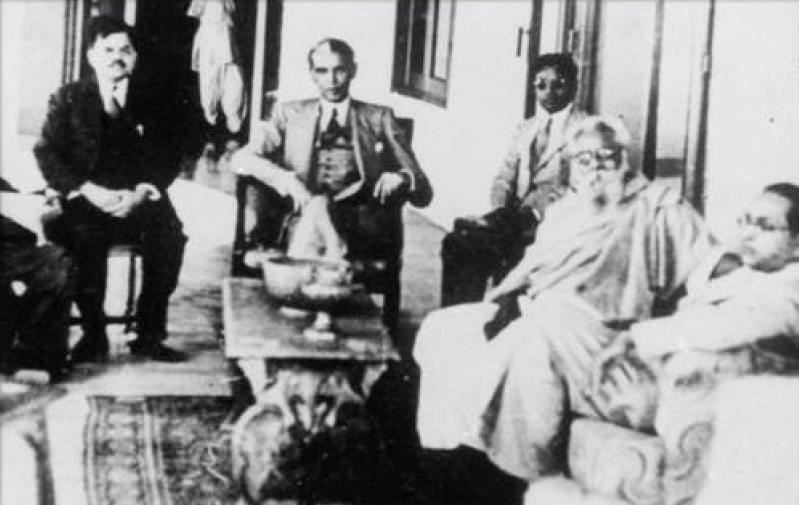
(From right to left) : B. R. Ambedkar, Periyar and Jinnah at Jinnah's residence in Bombay (8 January 1940)

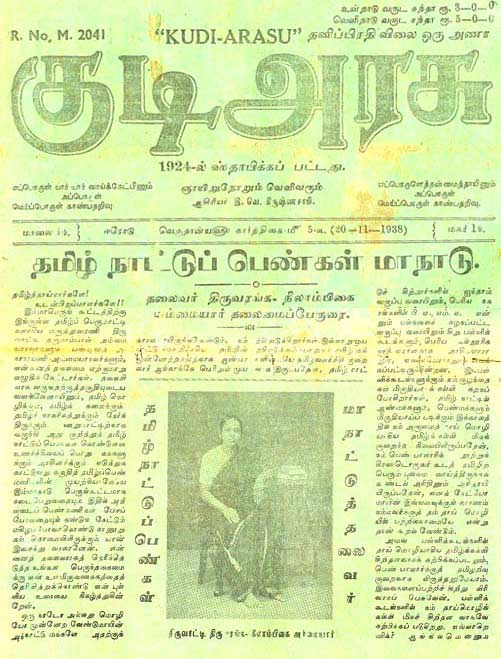
Frontpage of Kudiyarasu dated 20 November 1938. The story is about the Tamil Nadu Women's Conference

The anti-Hindi agitation was backed by Periyar's Self-Respect Movement and Justice Party. The Justice party was led by older, established leaders like Kurma Venkata Reddy Naidu and Pannirselvam, who did not have reputations as agitators and derived their power from patronage. Their representatives in the Madras Legislature demanded that the Hindi teaching be made optional. The more militant agitators led by Periyar did not have any patronage, but derived their influence from activism and politics of agitation. Periyar eventually became the president of the Justice Party during the course of the agitation. The agitation was also supported by Tamil scholars like Maraimalai Adigal, Somasundara Bharathi, K. Appadurai, Mudiyarasan, K. A. P. Viswanatham and Ilakkuvanar. In December 1937, Tamil Saivite scholars were among the first to announce their opposition to the Hindi teaching in the Saiva Sidhandha Maha Samaja conference at Velur. Women also participated in the agitation in large numbers. Moovalur Ramamirtham, Narayani, Va. Ba. Thamaraikani, Munnagar Azhagiyar, Dr. S. Dharmambal, Malar Mugathammaiyar, Pattammal and Seethammal were some of the women who were arrested for participating in the agitation. On 13 November 1938, the Tamil Nadu Women's Conference was convened to demonstrate women's support for the movement. Despite the anti-Brahmin sentiments of the backers of the agitation, a few Brahmins like Kanchi Rajagopalachari also participated in the movement. The Tamil speaking Muslims in Madras Province supported the agitation (in contrast to the Urdu speaking Muslims, who supported the propagation of Hindi, since Hindi–Urdu was technically a single language called Hindustani). P. Khalifulla Sahib, a Muslim League member representing Trichy in the Legislative Assembly, declared "I may at once say that I am a Rowther myself; my mother tongue is Tamil and not Urdu. I am not ashamed of it; I am proud of it.. We have not been told why Hindi after all has been chosen as the common language of India". Financial support for the agitation was provided by industrialists and landlords like W. P. A. Soundarapandian Nadar and G. D. Naidu. Acknowledging the agitation's popular support, Lord Erskine, the then Governor of Madras wrote to Viceroy Linlithgow in July 1938 that "Compulsory Hindi has been the cause of great trouble in this province and is certainly contrary to the wishes of the bulk of the population..."

== Fasts ==
On 1 May 1938, a young man named Stalin Jagadeesan went on a fast demanding the withdrawal of compulsory Hindi teaching. He became a symbol for the anti-Hindi agitators. In an interview published in Periyar's magazine Viduthalai he declared that his fast was to prove that Tamil Thai (lit. Mother Tamil) still had loyal sons. On 1 June, another man named Ponnusamy began a fast in front of Rajaji's house. Periyar did not approve of fasting as a form of protest. But other leaders of the agitation like C. N. Annadurai used Jagadeesan as an example. Annadurai declared in an anti-Hindi meeting that "If Jagadeesan dies, I am ready to take his place, and die along with ten others. As soon as Jagadeesan dies, you should also be prepared to die". Jagadeesan's fast was called off after ten weeks.

== Picketing and processions ==
A major feature of the agitation was the picketing of government offices and the schools where Hindi was being taught compulsorily. A boycott committee was formed on 1 June 1938 to coordinate the picketing. Rajaji's house in Mambalam, the Board High School at Tiruvarur and the Hindu Theosophical School at Triplicane, Madras became popular targets for the picketers. In that month Periyar started playing an active role in the agitation and the movement heated up. In November an anti-Hindi procession in Madras city turned violent and developed into a riot with protesters stoning the offices of Indian Express, Ananda Vikatan, Dina Mani and Tamil Mani. With Periyar's fiery speeches motivating them, the agitators gained response from the Police. The agitation which started relatively small, began to gain momentum.

== Tamil brigade ==
In August–September 1938, a protest march was jointly organised by the Self-Respect movement and the Muslim league. It was flagged of by Periyar and Khaliffullah. The marchers who called themselves Tamilar Padai (lit. Tamil brigade), started from Trichy on 1 August 1938. They were led by Pattukkottai Alagiri, Kumarasamy Pillai and Moovalur Ramamirtham. In the next 42 days, the marchers covered 234 villages and 60 towns. They addressed 87 public meetings and received widespread coverage in the press. They reached Madras on 11 September 1938 and were arrested for picketing government offices. The march succeeded in raising anti-Hindi and pro-Tamil support in smaller towns and villages they covered.

== Natarajan and Thalamuthu ==
Two persons died during the agitation and were claimed as martyrs by the agitators. Their deaths fueled the protests further. L. Natarajan was arrested On 5 December 1938. He was admitted to the hospital on 30 December and died on 15 January 1939. On 13 February 1939, Thalamuthu was arrested with others for picketing the Hindu Theological High School in Madras. While imprisoned, he fell ill on 6 March and died on 11 March. The government claimed that his death was due to Cellulitis and Amoebic dysentery and he was already in poor health when he died.

When the issue was raised in the Assembly, Rajaji dismissed it casually. The agitators were incensed by the government attitude and turned the dead men into martyrs. Their funeral processions in Madras were attended by hundreds of mourners and witnessed fiery speeches denouncing the government. Annadurai proclaimed that Natarajan's name and deeds should be inscribed in gold in the history of the world. The agitators praised their sacrifices and claimed that the dead men had refused early release in exchange for ending their activities. In an interview given to the Sunday Observer on 27 January 1939, Natarajan's father K. Lakshmanan said when his son was hospitalized he refused to apologize to get an early release.

== Anti Brahminism ==
The anti-Hindi movement viewed the Hindi legislation as an attempt by Brahmins to impose Hindi and Sanskrit over Tamil. Rajaji's earlier attempt to translate an English Language Physics book into Tamil using Sanskrit words was viewed as proof of his preference of Sanskrit over Tamil. The anti-Hindi movement portrayed the Brahmin-dominated Tamil Nadu Congress party as a stooge of "Hindi Imperialists" from the North. The resistance of the Brahmin Tamil scholars for removing Sanskrit words from Tamil was viewed by some in the agitation as proof of Brahmin complicity in the attempt to destroy Tamil. Rajaji was identified as an enemy of Tamil. Dravidian movement newspapers carried cartoons depicting Rajaji hurling a dagger at Tamil Thai and disrobing her. Similar banners were displayed in the processions taken out by anti-Hindi agitators. In an anti-Hindi meeting organised in August 1938, Pavalar Balasundaram accused the Brahmin community of "killing Tamil Thai". Rajaji's dismissal of Natarajan's death in the Assembly was denounced as "Aryans laughing while Tamils shed tears for their hero". Rajaji complained that the agitators were describing their opponents "by caste, by their sacred thread, by the tuft of the hair on their head".

Periyar, who had been arrested in November 1938, sent an address from jail which was read out in a rally organised on 29 December 1938. In it he called the Brahmins 'mosquitos', 'bugs' and 'Jews', and said that the abolition of the reign of priests was more urgent than the abolition of zamindari. Kumararajah Muthiah Chettiar, the leader of the opposition, claimed at the rally that Periyar's arrest had "awakened the masses"; Panneerselvam called Brahmins interlopers in the Tamil land, separating them from Tamils. The Hindu referred to "a hymn of hate" in their report of the rally.

== Government response ==
The ruling Congress Party was divided on the Hindi issue. While Rajaji and his supporters stuck to their position, Sathyamurti and Sarvepalli Radhakrishnan were against it. They wanted Rajaji to make Hindi optional or to provide a conscience clause for allowing parents to withhold their children from Hindi Classes. Satyamurti also disagreed with the use of Criminal Law Amendment Act of 1932 against the anti-Hindi agitators. In a letter written to Mahatma Gandhi on 7 July 1938, he wrote:

I personally believe that where a parent or guardian swears an affidavit before a magistrate stating his reasons that it is against his conscience that his boy or girl should learn Hindustani compulsorily, the child may be exempted. I personally believe very few parents or guardians will claim this exemption. This will expose the hollowness of the agitation and kill it. I wish you to write to Sri. C. Rajagopalachari suggesting this to him. Moreover, I am not very happy over the use by the Madras Government of the Criminal Law Amendment Act against these picketers.

Rajaji defended his action in another G.O. issued on 14 June 1938:

The attainment by our Province of its rightful place in the national life of India requires that our educated youth should possess a working knowledge of the most widely spoken language in India. Government have therefore decided upon the introduction of Hindustani in the secondary school curriculum of our province. Government desire to make it clear that Hindi is not to be introduced in any elementary school whatsoever, the mother tongue being the only language taught in such schools. Hindi is to be introduced only in secondary schools and there too only in the 1st, 2nd and 3rd forms, that is to say in the 6th, 7th and 8th years of school life. It will not therefore interfere in any way with the teaching of the mother tongue in the secondary schools....Hindi will be compulsory only in the sense that attendance in such classes will be compulsory and pupils cannot take Hindi as a substitute for Tamil, Telugu, Malayalam or Kannada, but must learn Hindi only in addition to one of these languages.

He refused to give in to the demands of the agitators. He claimed they were motivated by their "prejudices of anti-aryanism" and "hatred of the Congress". The police response to the agitation grew progressively brutal in 1939. Rajaji used the Criminal Law Amendment Act against the agitators, so that they could be charged of "non-bailable" criminal offenses. Displeased by his high handedness, Governor Erskine complained: "..[Rajaji] was too much of a Tory for me, for though I may want to go back twenty years, he wishes to go back two thousand and to run India as it was run in the time of King Ashoka". During the agitation, a total of 1,198 protesters were arrested and out of them 1,179 were convicted (73 of those jailed were women and some of them went to jail with their children; 32 children accompanied their mothers to prison). Periyar was fined 1,000 Rupees and sentenced to one year of rigorous imprisonment for inciting "women to disobey the law" (he was released within six months on 22 May 1939 citing medical grounds) and Annadurai was jailed for four months. On 7 June 1939, all those arrested for participating in the agitations were released without explanation. Rajaji also organised pro-Hindustani meetings to counter the agitators.

== Cancellation ==
On 29 October 1939, Rajaji's Congress Government resigned protesting the involvement of India in the Second World War. Madras provincial government was placed under Governor's rule. On 31 October, Periyar suspended the agitation and asked the Governor to withdraw the compulsory Hindi order. On 21 February 1940, Governor Erskine, issued a press communique withdrawing compulsory Hindi teaching and making it optional.

== Impact ==
The anti-Hindi agitations of 1937-40 led to a change of guard in the Madras Province. The main opposition party to the Indian National Congress in the state, the Justice Party, came under Periyar's leadership on 29 December 1938. In 1944, the Justice Party was renamed as Dravidar Kazhagam. The political careers of many later leaders of the Dravidian Movement, such as C. N. Annadurai, started with their participation in these agitations. The agitations stopped the compulsory teaching of Hindi in the state. The agitations also reshaped the Dravidian Movement and broadened its political base, when it shifted from its earlier pro-Tamil stance to a more inclusive one, which was both anti-Hindi and pro-English. In the words of Sumathi Ramaswamy (Professor of History at Duke University),

[The anti-Hindi agitations knit] together diverse, even incompatible, social and political interests... Their common cause against Hindi had thrown together religious revivalists like Maraimalai Atikal (1876-1950) with avowed atheists like Ramasami and Bharathidasan (1891-1964); men who supported the Indian cause like T.V. Kalyanasundaram (1883-1953) and M. P. Sivagnanam with dravidian movement supporters like Annadurai; university professors like Somasundara Bharati (1879-1959) and M.S. Purnalingam Pillai (1866 -1947) with uneducated street poets, populist pamphleteers and college students.

== See also ==
- Anti-Hindi agitations of Tamil Nadu
- Dravidian parties
- Rise of Dravidian parties to power in Tamil Nadu
