= Suba Veerapandian =

Indian political activist (born 1952)

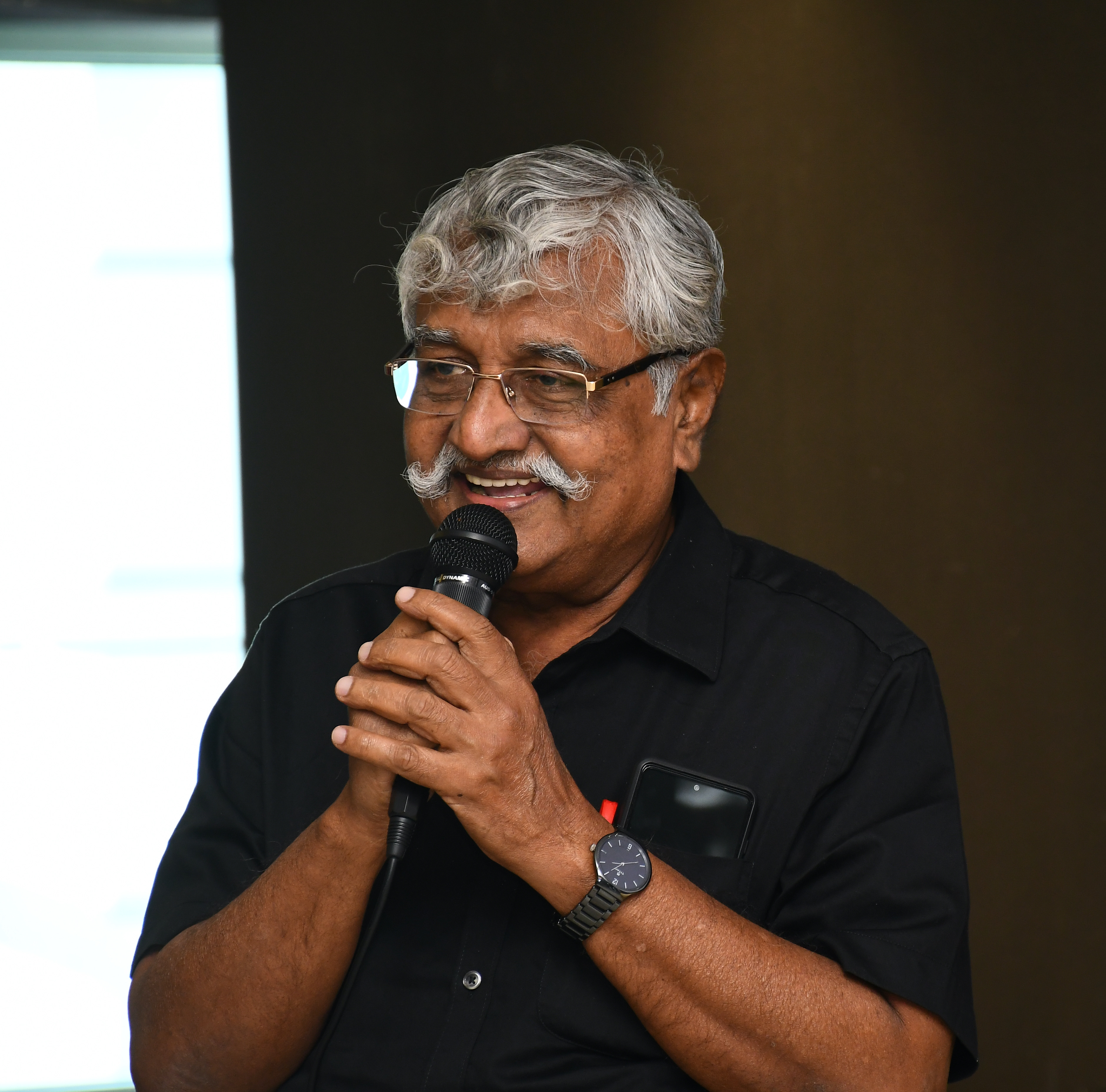

Chairperson of Social Justice Monitoring Committee of Tamil Nadu
- Incumbent
- Assumed office 22 October 2021

Member of the Advisory Committee for Tamil Nadu Text Book and Educational Services Corporation
- Incumbent
- Assumed office 27 July 2021

General Secretary of Dravida Iyyakka Tamilar Peravai
- Incumbent
- Assumed office 22 January 2007
- Preceded by: Post established

Personal details
- Born: 22 April 1952 (age 74) Karaikudi, Madras State (now Tamil Nadu), India
- Spouse: Vasantha (m. 1973)
- Children: Lenin (b.1974); Indhira (b.1978); Bharatidasan (b.1980)
- Parent(s): Rama Subbaiah (1908–1997); Visalatchi (d.1987)
- Relatives: S. P. Muthuraman (b.1935) (elder brother)
- Education: M.A., Ph.D.
- Alma mater: University of Madras
- Occupation: Author; Social worker
- Awards: 'Iyal Selvam' (2012) (given by Muthamizh Peravai)

Subbaiah Palaniappan Veerapandian (born 22 April 1952), known popularly as Suba Veerapandian or Subavee, is an Indian political activist, author, orator, former Tamil-language professor and former film artist. Since 2007, he has been serving as the general secretary of the Dravida Iyyakka Tamilar Peravai, a Tamil Nadu-based political organisation that aims to promote Ambedkarite, Dravidian and Marxist ideals in the State and elsewhere.

In 2021, Subavee was appointed to two posts – Member of the Advisory Committee for Tamil Nadu Text Book and Educational Services Corporation, and as chairperson of the newly constituted Social Justice Monitoring Committee of Tamil Nadu.

== Early life and career ==
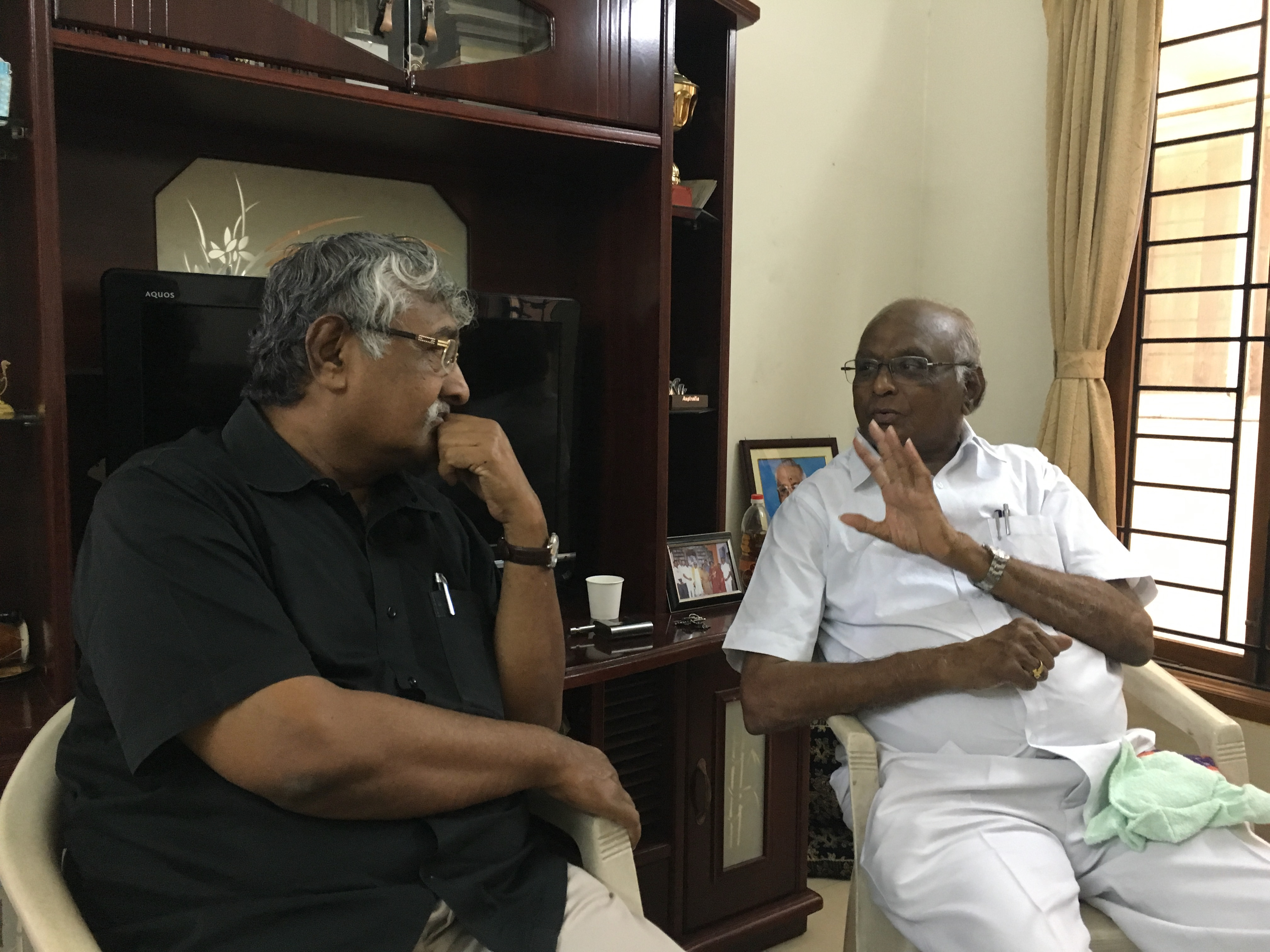
Subavee with his brother S. P. Muthuraman, in 2016

Subavee was born in Karaikudi on the early morning of 22 April 1952 as the youngest of seven children to Rama.Subbaiah (1908–1997) and Visalatchi (d.19 September 1987). His eldest living brother is Tamil film director S. P. Muthuraman. As per the norms in their region, Subavee's parents gave him another name – Pazhaniyappan (name of his paternal grandfather) – which became obsolete over time.

After his Pre-university course. Subavee pursued a B.Sc. degree in physics at Alagappa Government Arts College (1967–71). During this period, his classmate in language classes was V. V. Rajan Chellappa, who was then studying for a bachelor's degree in Political Science.

Subavee joined Pachaiyappa's College, Chennai to do a master's degree in Tamil literature. In 1973, he graduated from Madras University with a gold medal in Tamil Literature. His classmates included Tamil poet Vairamuthu. From 1982 to 1986, Subavee was also a part-time PhD scholar at the Department of Tamil, Presidency College, Chennai.

After completing his education, he joined as a typist-cum-clerk in Madras University on 16 August 1971. In 1976, he joined as a tutor of Tamil at S.I.V.E.T College in Chennai, as a lecturer of Tamil at Sentamil College, Thiruppanandal (14 September 1982 – February 1984) and then in P. M.T. College in Tirunelveli district (Feb- Dec 1984). On 5 December 1984, he rejoined S.I.V.E.T College.

Following the Madras High Court's dismissal of an order (which caused a break in his career), Subavee resumed teaching at S.I.V.E.T College from February 1997. On 15 September, he submitted his letter for voluntary retirement and was relieved on the evening of 15 December.

== Political activism ==
Subavee has been an atheist right from his early years. He developed an early interest in politics, owing to his father Rama.Subbaiah's status as an ardent supporter of the Dravidian movement, a member of the DMK's general council, and as a Member of Tamil Nadu Legislative Council from the party. Rama.Subbaiah was also housed in Tiruchirappalli Central Prison in 1953 for participating with DMK leader M. Karunanidhi in the Kallakudi demonstration, a part of the Anti-Hindi agitations.

Subavee was greatly influenced and motivated by the speeches of "Periyar" EV Ramasamy, C.N. Annadurai, M. Karunanidhi, "Navalar" V. R. Nedunchezhiyan, E. V. K. Sampath, K. Kalimuthu and P. Seenivasan. Apart from campaigning for his father in the Karaikudi seat during the 1957 Madras Legislative Assembly election, Subavee also participated in the 1965 phase of the Anti-Hindi agitations as a Class IX student.

While working in college, he formed an organisation named Tamilar Iyakkam (Tamils Movement).

In 1979, Subavee was imprisoned along with others including professor-poet Kuruvikkarambai Shanmugam for a week in connection with a protest organised by the Association of University Teachers (AUT), in which he was serving as Secretary for Zone II. The protest was against the first MGR ministry's decision to shift the Pre-university course (PUC) in Tamil Nadu's higher education institutions to schools (as classes XI and XII). The protesters feared that the government's decision will affect existing staff in PUCs. Eventually, the government announced that PUC teachers will be transferred to colleges with vacant posts.

In 1980, he befriended poet Inkulab and gained an interest in Communism. During the years of work in Thiruppanandal, Subavee began to participate in public events. This enabled him to gain friendship with writers Pothiya Verpan and Kudanthai Geethalayan, who enhanced his inclination towards Marxism.

From 1983, Subavee began to support the Tamil Eelam struggle. Though he initially supported all Tamil militant groups, he exclusively became an LTTE supporter in 1987 when Thileepan, a prominent LTTE militant, died after a 12-day-long hunger strike. At this point, Subavee also became familiar with Tamil nationalism as a political rhetoric. In the same year, he was elected as the organiser of the Federation for the Protection of Rights of Eelam Tamils, in which personalities such as Perunchitiranar, Salai Elanthiraiyan, Mu. Metha, Gnani Sankaran, Inkulab and Arulmozhi Kuganathan were members. Subavee recollected his appointment as an "accident" and his "first entry into politics".

On 12 May 1990, Subavee became the founder-secretary of a newly found organisation named Viduthalaikuyilkal (Liberation Cuckoos). In June, he was imprisoned for 20 days along with about 100 others in Tiruchirappalli Central Prison for participating in a rally against a ban on "Tamil Nation's Self Determination Conference" held in Thanjavur by Pazha Nedumaran (president of Tamilar Desiya Iyakkam). His prison-mates included Perunchithiranar, Pozhilan (Perunchithiranar's son), Ki. Venkatraman, Salai Elanthiraiyan, and Salini Elanthiraiyan. During the imprisonment, Venkatraman repeatedly said to Subavee: "At a point, quit the teaching job and become a full-time cadre for serving people through politics". Subavee later recollected "The seed that he [Venkatraman] sowed that day could be said of as the chief reason for my transformation as a full-time [political] worker seven years later... As far as I am concerned, that imprisonment was one which moved me towards full-time politics".

On 5 March 1992, Subavee (then general secretary of Viduthalaikuyilkal) was arrested and later imprisoned in Madras Central Prison. The charge against him was that of forcing shops in Thana Street (in Purasawalkam, Chennai) to shut in order to show solidarity with the Eelam Tamils. The arrest came just before the planned "Tamils Unity Conference" that was to be held on 8 March by Viduthalaikuyilkal. On the scheduled day, Nedumaran and 96 others were arrested (for trying to rally towards the conference pandal) and brought to the same prison. Subavee came out on bail five days later and so did the others, gradually.

In September 1992, Subavee spent 15 days in prison for his pro-LTTE speech at "Tamilar Vaazhvurimai Maanaadu" organised by PMK. His prison-mates included S. Ramadoss (PMK founder), Nedumaran, Panruti S. Ramachandran, Nellikkuppam V. Krishnamurthy, Professor Dheeran, P. Maniyarasan and Thozhar Thiyagu.

In January 1993, Subavee, Nedumaran and functionaries from the PMK and Dravidar Kazhagam planned for a mass rally in Madras condemning the "assassination" of Kittu, an LTTE commander, on the 16th. On the same day of their discussion, Subavee was arrested along with Nedumaran and Pulamaipithan. It was alleged in court that these three, along with Professor Saraswathi, conspired to blow up the Jawaharlal Nehru Stadium in Madras that was to be inaugurated by the then Prime Minister P. V. Narasimha Rao on 19 January. Saraswathi was released on bail, while the three men were sentenced to 15 days of judicial custody.

On 1 January 1994, he merged his Tamilar Iyakkam with Thozhar Thiyagu's Thileepan Mandram (Thileepan Forum) to form the "Tamil-Tamilar Iyakkam" (Tamil-Tamils Movement). In November, he was imprisoned for a week, in connection with his pro-LTTE speech in a meeting.

In 1995, Subavee also became a member of Tamilchandror Peravai (Assembly of Tamil Scholars) in which he showed additional involvement.

In December 1996, Subavee was briefly jailed along with Maniyarasan in Vellore Central Prison for another speech in support of LTTE, which by then had become an officially proscribed organisation. During this imprisonment, he was suspended from his job as professor. He got bail in late December, a year before his voluntary retirement as a professor in late 1997.

From 1998, he began to accept the Eelam Tamil diaspora's calls to travel abroad and to gather international support for the "rationales behind the struggle of the LTTE". The National Television of Tamileelam (NTT), the Tigers' official television channel, reported Prabhakaran's statement: "Father Gaspar and Subavee are campaigning for us all over Europe. [The Tamil diaspora] should receive them and utilize them for meetings".

In 2001, Subavee quit the Tamil-Tamilar Iyakkam due to differences with Thiyagu, and worked solely with Tamilchandror Peravai.

" [People like Thiyagu and Maniyarasan] gradually created the impression that Tamil nationalism was more correct than Dravidian nationalism. They instilled in me the idea that Dravidian nationalism was also a factor in the obstruction of Tamil nationalism. I also believed this to be true. I criticized all other Dravidian leaders except Periyar. Among the leaders who came under my severe criticism are Kalaignar [Karunanidhi] and Asiriyar Ayya Veeramani
[ Dravidar Kazhagam president ] ".

— Subavee.

In 2002, he joined Pazha Nedumaran's Tamilar Desiya Iyakkam (Tamils National Movement) and became its general secretary.

In August 2002, Tamil Nadu Police booked Subavee along with Nedumaran, Pudukottai Paavanan and Dr. Thayappan Azhagirisamy under Section 21 of the Prevention of Terrorism Act (POTA) for making speeches in support of LTTE. Earlier, on 11 July 2002, the same section was used to book MDMK general secretary Vaiko under similar charges. On 29 March 2003, the Government of India submitted in the Supreme Court that Vaiko's speech constituted an act of terrorism under the POTA. This meant that Vaiko, Subavee and others were likely to get up to 10 years of imprisonment. On the early morning of 30 March 2003, DMK president M. Karunanidhi asked his party MP and the then Union minister T. R. Baalu to pressurise the Union government into changing their statement. On the same day, the ruling National Democratic Alliance held a discussion meet in New Delhi, during which Baalu criticised the government's statement. He also conveyed Karunanidhi's stand to Deputy Prime Minister L. K. Advani and Minister of Law & Justice Arun Jaitley. The next day, Jaitley announced that there were some errors in the government's statement that were corrected by redacting paragraphs 12 and 13. He added that some junior lawyers had erroneously written in the statement that even verbal support to a proscribed organisation amounts to terrorism. Jaitley clarified that the Union government did not endorse the said statement. As a result, Subavee, Paavanan and Thayappan were released under bail on 22 December 2003 (Vaiko received bail on 7 February 2004). This was the point from which Subavee started to consistently wear a black shirt.

On the same day of their release, Subavee and Thayappan went to Anna Arivalayam (the DMK's headquarters) and met Karunanidhi to thank him for his involvement in their release. This was not received well by some members of the Tamilar Desiya Iyakkam. However, Nedumaran himself met Karunanidhi with Subavee on 9 January 2004, a day after being released. Both Subavee and Nedumaran campaigned all over Tamil Nadu for the DMK-led Democratic Progressive Alliance during the 2004 Indian general election. However, during the 2006 Tamil Nadu assembly election, Tamilar Desiya Iyakkam refused to campaign for the alliance. Protesting this decision, Subavee quit as the organisation's general secretary and primary member on 15 April. On Nakkeeran Gopal's arrangement, he met Karunanidhi on 17 April. From 19 April onwards, he began to speak in pro-DMK meetings. After Karunanidhi returned as Chief Minister of Tamil Nadu in 2006, he withdrew the POTA cases that his predecessor J. Jayalalithaa filed against Subavee, Nedumaran, Paavanan and Thayappan.

During Karunanidhi's rule, Subavee was able to bring to his direct attention much news pertaining to the Eelam issue. He arranged a 70-minutes-long meeting on 20 December 2006, in which five Sri Lankan Tamil MPs – R. Sampanthan, Mavai Senathirajah, Suresh Premachandran, Selvam Adaikalanathan and G. G. Ponnambalam – spoke with Karunanidhi, M. K. Stalin and M. K. Kanimozhi. The topics of the discussion included the sufferings undergone by the Eelam Tamils, state terrorism, and the Supreme Court's ruling against former Lankan President J. R. Jayewardene's 1988 proclamation of merging the Northern and Eastern Provinces. Promising the MPs of all possible help, Karunanidhi sent Subavee to accompany the MPs to Delhi on 22 December to meet the then Prime Minister Manmohan Singh.

On 22 January 2007, Subavee launched the Dravida Iyyakka Tamilar Peravai (Dravidian Movement's Tamils' Assembly) at Kalaivanar Arangam, in the presence of K. Anbazhagan (then Tamil Nadu's Minister of Finance). The motto of the organisation is "ஆரியத்தால் வீழ்ந்தோம், திராவிடத்தால் எழுந்தோம், தமிழியத்தால் வெல்வோம்" ("(We) fell by Aryanism, arose by Dravidianism, and will win by Tamilism"). Subavee has been serving as its general secretary ever since.

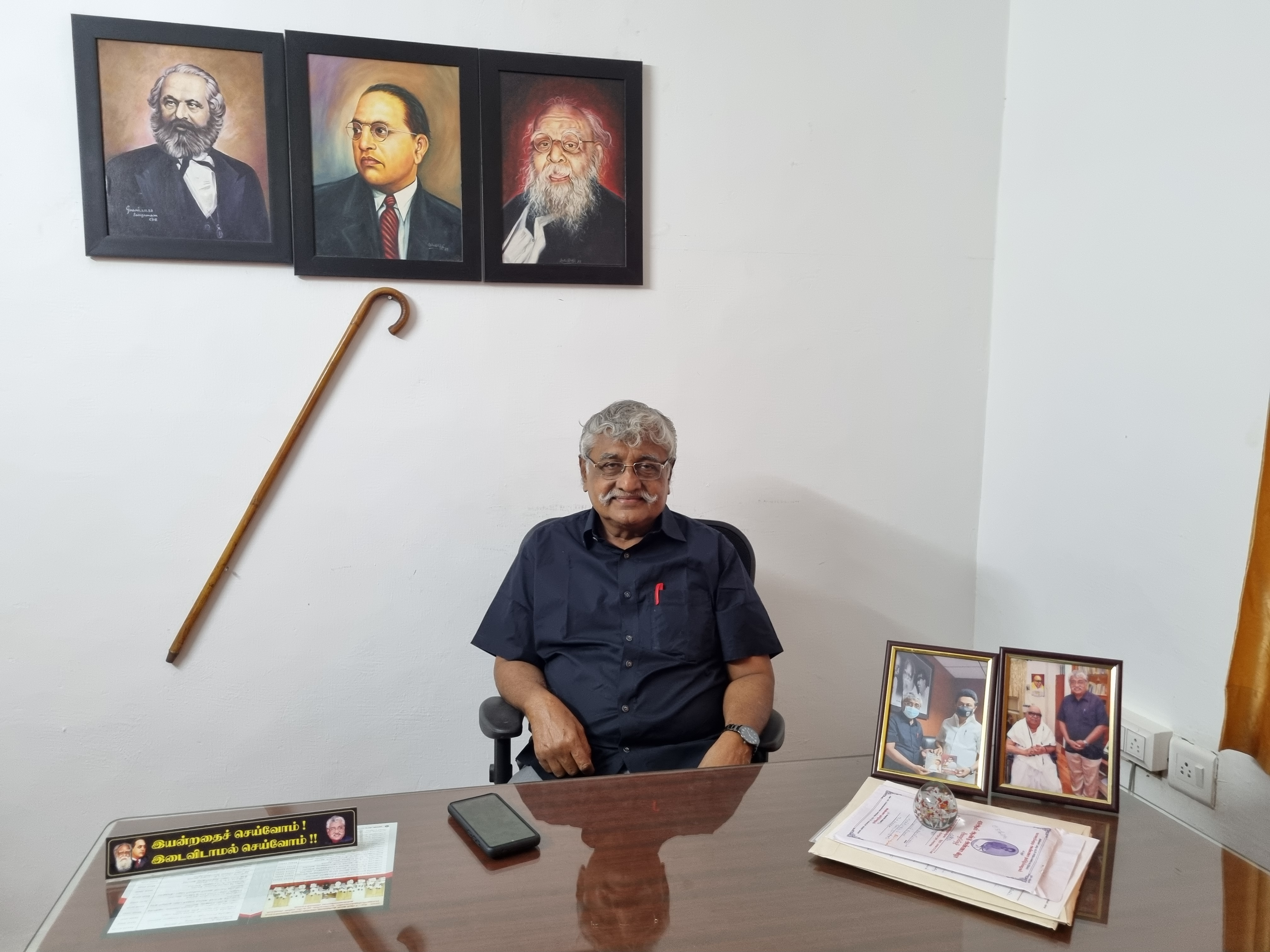
Subavee's Dravida Iyakka Thamizhar Peravai office

Subavee campaigned for the DMK alliance during the 2011 Tamil Nadu Legislative Assembly election. His campaign began on 23 March in Thiruvarur and ended on the evening of 11 April in Neyveli.

On 12 August 2012, he participated in the "Eelam Tamils Rights Protection Conference" organised by the DMK, in which many other luminaries from outside Tamil Nadu were present.

On 2 January 2022, Ka. Su. Nagarajan's Tamil Nadu Dravidar Kazhagam (not to be confused with the Dravidar Kazhagam) merged with the Dravida Iyyakka Tamilar Peravai. The merger ceremony was held at the Corporation Kalaiarangam in Coimbatore. The event was attended by V. Senthil Balaji (then Tamil Nadu Minister for Electricity, Prohibition and Excise) and M. Kannappan (former Union Minister for Non-conventional energy sources). At the ceremony, Subavee appointed Nagarajan as the Peravai's state organisation secretary. The latter's predecessor Pulendran was appointed as the Peravai's state principal secretary. Subavee indicated that many other Periyarist organisations would come to work with the Peravai. Furthermore, he said that the Peravai would hold protests for abolishing National Eligibility cum Entrance Test and for State Rights.

Subavee has advocated for progressive reforms pertaining to caste abolition and women's rights.

== Positions held ==
On 27 July 2021, Tamil Nadu Chief Minister M.K. Stalin appointed Subavee as a member of the Advisory Committee for Tamil Nadu Text Book and Educational Services Corporation (TNTBESC).

On 22 October 2021, Subavee also became Chairperson of the Social Justice Monitoring Committee of Tamil Nadu.

== Journalism ==
During his career as a professor, Subavee wrote articles and poems for several journals, including Chutti, Viduthalai, Unmai, and Thenmozhi (owned by Perunchithiranar). In 1984, he published the தமிழீழச் சிவப்பு மலர் (translit.Tamiḻīḻac civappu malar; meaning Red Flower of Tamil Eelam) exposing the anti-Tamils violence in Sri Lanka. Later, he served as editor-in-chief for Ini (Hereafter; 26 November 1992 -December 1995), Nandan Vazhi (Nandan's Way; 1 May 1997 – 28 March 2000), and Thaayagam (Homeland).

He is currently the editor of the fortnightly magazine Karunchattai Tamilar (Blackshirt Tamils) since July 2007.

== Works ==
Subavee began to keep a diary right since 1963. He has written nearly 40 books on Tamil literature, politics and history. He also has written and published 11 short stories as of 2012.

Year	Tamil title (Transliteration)	Meaning	Type	Publisher
1972	புதுத் தென்றல் (Putut teṉṟal)	New Breeze [co-authored with Sembai Xavier]	Poetry	Paari Nilayam, Chennai
1985	இந்தக் காலக் கவிதை உத்திகள் (Intak kālak kavitai uttikaḷ)	Poetic Techniques of This Age	Poetry	Kanimuthup Pathipagam, Chennai
1987	பகத்சிங்கும் இந்திய அரசியலும் (Pakatciṅkum intiya araciyalum)	Bhagat Singh and Indian Politics	Political critique	Tamil Farm (1995) 3rd ed.
1990	மண்டல் அறிக்கையால் மாறும் அரசியல் (Maṇṭal aṟikkaiyāl māṟum araciyal)	The Politics That's Changing due to Mandal Commission Report	Political critique	Viduthalaikuyilkal
1992	தடா தடா தடா : அடக்குமுறைச் சட்டங்களைத் துரத்தியடிப்போம் (Taṭā taṭā taṭā: Aṭakkumuṟaic caṭṭaṅkaḷait turattiyaṭippōm)	TADA TADA TADA: Let's Chase Away Repressive Laws	Political critique (co-authored with Ki. Venkatraman)	அடக்குமுறைச்சட்ட எதிர்ப்புக் கூட்டியக்கம் (Aṭakkumuṟaiccaṭṭa etirppuk kūṭṭiyakkam) [Coalition Against Repressive Laws]
1994	இந்த விதை முளைக்கும் (Inta vitai muḷaikkum)	This Seed Will Sprout	Novel	Aadhi Pathippagam, Chennai
2001	உடையும் சித்திரங்கள் (Uṭaiyum cittiraṅkaḷ)	Breaking Paintings	Political critique	Tamil Mulakkam, Chennai
2004	குடும்பமும் அரசியலும் (Kuṭumpamum araciyalum)	Family and Politics	Political critique	Tamil Mulakkam, Chennai
2005	பெரியாரின் இடதுசாரித் தமிழ்த்தேசியம் (Periyāriṉ iṭatucārit tamiḻttēciyam)	Periyar's Left-wing Tamil Nationalism	Political critique	Tamil Mulakkam, Chennai
2008	அது ஒரு பொடா காலம் (Atu oru poṭā kālam)	That Was A POTA Period	Autobiography	Vaanavil Puthakalayam, Chennai
2012	குறள்வானம் (அறத்துப்பால்) [Kuṟaḷvāṉam (aṟattuppāl)]	Kural-sky ([a critique on] Book of Virtue)	Prose	Vaanavil Puthakalayam, Chennai
2012	கவிதா (Kavitā)	–	Novel	Vaanavil Puthakalayam, Chennai
2012	வந்ததும் வாழ்வதும் (Vantatum vāḻvatum)	(My) Arriving and Living	Autobiography	Vaanavil Puthakalayam, Chennai
2012	திராவிடத்தால் எழுந்தோம் (Tirāviṭattāl eḻuntōm)	We arose by Dravidianism	Political critique	Vaanavil Puthakalayam, Chennai
2012	ஒன்றே சொல் நன்றே சொல் (Oṉṟē col naṉṟē col)	Say One Thing, Say It Good (in six volumes)	Political critique	Vaanavil Puthakalayam, Chennai
2013	ஈழம் தமிழகம் நான் : சில பதிவுகள் (Īḻam tamiḻakam nāṉ: Cila pativukaḷ)	Eelam, Tamil Nadu, and I: Some Thoughts	Political critique	Sixthsense Publications, Chennai
2013	இளமை எனும் பூங்காற்று (Iḷamai eṉum pūṅkāṟṟu)	Youthhood, the Flowery Breeze	Political critique	Nakkheeran Publications, Chennai
2013	சிங்களன் முதல் சங்கரன் வரை (Ciṅkaḷaṉ mutal caṅkaraṉ varai)	From Sinhala to Sankara	Political critique	Sixthsense Publications, Chennai
2014	அறிந்தும் அறியாமலும் (Aṟintum aṟiyāmalum)	Knowingly and Unknowingly	Political critique	Sixthsense Publications, Chennai
2015	திராவிடம் வளர்த்த தமிழ் (Tirāviṭam vaḷartta tamiḻ)	The Tamil that Dravidianism Nurtured	Political critique	Sixthsense Publications, Chennai
2015	தீட்டும் புனிதமும் (Tīṭṭum puṉitamum)	Uncleanness and Holiness	Collection of Speeches	Sixthsense Publications, Chennai
2017	எதுவாக இருக்கும்? (Etuvāka irukkum?)	What Could It Be?	Poetry	Sixthsense Publications, Chennai
2017	வலி (Vali)	Pain	Travelogue	Sixthsense Publications, Chennai
2017	காற்றை கைது செய்து... : (மேடை இலக்கியம் ) (Kāṟṟai kaitu ceytu...) (Mēṭai ilakkiyam)	Arresting the Wind.... (Stage Literature)	Collection of Speeches	Sixthsense Publications, Chennai
2017(?)-21(?)	ஒரு நிமிடம் ஒரு செய்தி (Oru nimiṭam oru ceyti)	One Minute One Message (in four volumes)	Political critique	Vaanavil Puthakalayam, Chennai Karunchattai Pathippagam
2018	இதுதான் ராமராஜ்யம் (Itutāṉ rāmarājyam)	This is What Kingdom of Rama is	Political critique	Dravida Iyakka Tamizhar Peravai
2021(?)	நாயக்கர் காலம் ஓர் அறிமுகம் (Nāyakkar kālam ōr aṟimukam)	The Nayaka Period: An Introduction	Political critique	Karunchattai Pathippagam
2021(?)	மானுடம் திராவிடம் சமத்துவம் (பாகம் 1) (Māṉuṭam tirāviṭam camattuvam (pākam 1)	Humanism, Dravidianism and Equality (Part 1) [co-authored with Prof. Karunanandan, Kolathur Mani, Pollachi Ma Umapathy and Udayakumar]	Political critique	Karunchattai Pathippagam
2021	ஒரு நூற்றாண்டில் தமிழகம் கண்ட போராட்டங்கள் (Oru nūṟṟāṇṭil tamiḻakam kaṇṭa pōrāṭṭaṅkaḷ)	The struggles faced by Tamil Nadu in a Century	Political critique	Karunchattai Pathippagam
2021	கருப்பும் காவியும் (Karuppum kāviyum)	Black and Saffron	Political critique	Karunchattai Pathippagam
2021	திராவிட இயக்கமும் இந்துக்களும் (Tirāviṭa iyakkamum intukkaḷum)	Dravidian Movement and Hindus	Political critique	Karunchattai Pathippagam
2021	வால்டேரும் ரூசோவும் (Vālṭērum rūcōvum)	Voltaire and Rousseau	Political critique	Karunchattai Pathippagam
2021	ஸ்டீபன் ஹாக்கிங் பார்வையில் கடவுள் உண்டா? (Sṭīpaṉ hākkiṅ pārvaiyil kaṭavuḷ uṇṭā?)	Is there God in Stephen Hawking's viewpoint?	Philosophical Essays	Karunchattai Pathippagam
2021	நாங்கள் திராவிடக் கூட்டம் (Nāṅkaḷ tirāviṭak kūṭṭam)	We Belong to Dravidian Stock	Political critique	Karunchattai Pathippagam
2021	நீங்கள் எந்தப் பக்கம்? (Nīṅkaḷ entap pakkam?)	Which Side Are You On?	Political critique	Karunchattai Pathippagam
	இடைவேளை (Iṭaivēḷai)	Intermission	Novel	
	என் நாட் குறிப்பிலிருந்து... (Eṉ nāṭ kuṟippiliruntu...)	From My Diary	Travelogue	
	ஈழம் காப்போம் (Īḻam kāppōm)	Let's Save Eelam	Political critique	
	தமிழகப் பண்பாட்டு வரலாறு (சுருக்கம்) (Tamiḻakap paṇpāṭṭu varalāṟu)	History of Tamil Nadu's Culture	Political critique	

== Radio, television and film career ==
Right from his college years, Subavee began to write plays, inspired by (and imitating) Karunanidhi's style as seen in films like Raja Rani (1956). He also used to mono-act the exchange between Cheran Senguttuvan and his wife Venmal as found in the aforementioned film. His interest to work in the film industry was discouraged by his brother. Later, during his career as a clerk in Madras University, he founded a theatrical troupe named Kalaivanar Kalaimanram (in memory of actor-comedian N. S. Krishnan). Actress Kutty Padmini performed in one of the troupe's play, titled Aval oru Navarasam.

From 1972 to 1978, Subavee worked as a radio-play actor. He produced a serial show for Makkal TV, titled Kalloori Vaasal (College Gate). It did not give the expected success.

Subavee made his film debut as dialogue writer (uncredited) for Mudhal Kural (1992) directed by V.C. Guhanathan (who became a friend to Subavee's family after introducing his brother into Kollywood as a director). Subavee paired with his colleague Peer Muhamad and in about two weeks, wrote dialogues for about 60 scenes. At a point, Subavee and Guhanathan differed over the portrayal of the female lead after she becomes a widow. Being a rationalist, Subavee argued that the heroine has revolutionary ideals and therefore need not be portrayed in a white saree (attire of a traditional Hindu widow). Guhanathan said "There are some sentiments when it comes to cinema. Women [in the audience] will not accept if we do as you say". As it was Guhanathan's project, Subavee chose not to stress on his opinion. This was the point at which both decided to end their film partnership and collaborate only in pro-Eelam activities. Subavee also insisted on not being named in the film credits, as only 10 of the 60 scenes he wrote made their way into the final script.

Subavee appeared as a magazine editor in the film Ilakkanam (2006) directed by Chandraseyan.

Starting from 17 September 2008, Subavee appeared in an eight-minute speech programme titled ஒன்றே சொல் நன்றே சொல் (Say One Thing, Say It Good) in Kalaignar TV.

He also wrote lyrics for the song Achamenna Achamenna Aasai Thamizhey from the film Vengayam (2011) directed by Sankagiri Rajkumar.

When approached by director K. V. Anand for acting as a newspaper editor in Ko (2011), Subavee declined that role. Later, director Suseenthiran approached him for offering a role as a rebel leader in a film (unreleased as of 2021). Citing his socio-political commitment, Subavee declined that role as well.

When asked about his favourite actor, Subavee said that he once liked M. G. Ramachandran and that his present favourite was Suriya, whom he valued for the latter's "sense of social responsibility". He also commended Siddharth along the same lines.

== Awards ==
- 2006: Received title of Kalaimamani Award by the Government of Tamil Nadu, which is the highest state honour in the field of Arts.
- 2012: Received the Iyal Selvam award from Karunanidhi, at the Muthamizh Vizha organised by the Muthamizh Peravai.

== Personal life ==
Subavee married Vasantha (granddaughter of his aunt) on 8 February 1973. Their wedding was presided over by K. Rajaram, then minister in the second Karunanidhi ministry.

The couple has three children – Lenin (b.1974), Indhira (b.1978) and Bharatidasan (b.1980). Lenin was named after Subavee's eldest (deceased) brother who himself was named after Vladimir Lenin. Indhira was named after Subavee's second eldest sister (deceased). Bharatidasan got his name from the Tamil poet of the same name.

Lenin married Vijayalakshmi (daughter of Subavee's brother-in-law Ramasamy) at a wedding held at Hotel Palmgrove, Chennai in May 2000. The couple has a daughter named Oviya and a son named Kumaran.

Indhira married Suresh in December 2001. The couple has two sons – Naveen (b. 30 August 2002) and Nithin.

Bharatidasan married Vidya in September 2005. The couple has two sons named Shravan and Samaran.

Indhira's and Bharatidasan's were inter-caste marriages. All three weddings were presided over by Nedumaran. Karunanidhi also took part in Indhira's wedding.
