= Ariyanayagiamman Temple =

Temple in Keezhanilaikkottai

Ariyanayagiamman Temple is situated at Keezhanilaikkottai in Tirumayam taluk in Pudukkottai district in Tamil Nadu, India.

== Location ==
It is located at a distance of 14 km in Arantangi-Pudukkottai road near Arimalam

== Presiding deity ==
The presiding deity is known as Ariyanayagiamman.

== Speciality ==
The deity is considered as the clan deity of the village. During the last Tuesday of the Tamil month of Aadi, 'Madhu Eduppu Thiruvizha', bringing liquor in pots by the devotees and offering them to the deity took place.

== Worshipping time ==
Pujas are held four times daily at Kalasanthi (8.00 a.m.), Uttchikkalam (noon 12.00), Sayaratchai (5.30 p.m.) and Arthajamam (8.00 p.m.). The temple is opened for worship from 6.00 a.m. to 12.30 p.m. and from 4.30 p.m. to 8.30 p.m. During the Tamil month of Ani 11 day festival is held and during Purattasi nine day navaratri festival is held. On the 11th day of Ani festival, the processional deity of the Amman comes around the temple.

== Kumbhabhishekham ==
The Kumbhabhishekham of the temple was held in June 2023.
