= Mudhal Kural =

- VCD cover
- Directed by: V. C. Guhanathan
- Screenplay by: V. C. Guhunathan; Suba Veerapandian (dialogues)
- Produced by: V.C. Nellai Anandan; V.C. Varathananthan
- Starring: Sivaji Ganesan; Arjun Sarja; Kanaka
- Cinematography: Ranga
- Edited by: R.T Annadurai
- Music by: Chandrabose
- Production company: Victory Movies
- Release date: 14 August 1992
- Running time: 127 minutes
- Country: India
- Language: Tamil

Mudhal Kural (transl. First Voice) is a 1992 Indian Tamil-language action drama film directed by V. C. Guhanathan and produced by Nellai Anandan and Varadanandan. The film stars Sivaji Ganesan, Arjun Sarja and Kanaka. It was released on 14 August 1992.

== Plot ==
Veluthambi, a popular rebel in Puliyampatti constituency, is considered a threat a threat by the ruling party, particularly by senior leader and minister Mohanamba (Mohana), who plans to contest the upcoming election from the same seat. Mohana's attempts to remove him from the political scene are unsuccessful. Her relative, "Salpatta" Vasu, a wealthy businessman, hires henchmen to eliminate Veluthambi and his comrades. Although Veluthambi manages to fend off the henchmen, his comrades are burned alive in a hut. Later, the local police inspector, who colludes with the attackers, shoots Veluthambi dead, leading to widespread outrage among the public.

Jeeva, a senior journalist from Dina Madal, begins investigating Veluthambi's murder to expose the truth. Mohana tries to suppress Jeeva's efforts but fails. Subsequently, Jeeva is dismissed from his job at Dina Madal but joins another newspaper to continue his work. His reports lead to threats from Vasu's men, who attack Jeeva's home. Jeeva's son, Kumaran, intervenes and repels the attackers.

Kumaran, a third-year B.A. English Literature student, romantically involved with Vasu’s daughter, Vaani. Upon discovering Vasu’s role in the attack on Jeeva, Kumaran distances himself from her. Vaani visits Jeeva under the pretense of learning journalism, and Jeeva agrees to mentor her. Believing their relationship would endanger his father, Kumaran sends Vaani away. Jeeva attempts to seek Vasu’s approval for their relationship, but Vasu insults him and arranges a marriage for Vaani. Vasu confines her, but Kumaran rescues her, and they marry in a temple.

Jeeva is fired from his new job after his reporting implicates Mohana in Veluthambi's murder. Realizing Vasu's has bought this newsagency, he vows to expose both Vasu and Mohana.

Rekha, another tenant, shows interest in Karan, a fellow resident. While traveling to meet her mother, Rekha is abducted by Vasu's men, but she escapes. During her escape, she encounters Karan. Tragically she falls off a cliff while fleeing from one of Vasu's henchmen, despite Karan's attempts to save her.

Rekha, another tenant, shows interest in Karan, a fellow resident. While traveling to meet her mother, Rekha is abducted by Vasu’s men, but she escapes. During her escape, she encounters Karan. Tragically, she falls off a cliff while fleeing, despite Karan’s attempt to save her.

Jeeva files a lawsuit against Mohana for Veluthambi's murder, and the case is brought to court. Vasu arranges for a bomb to be planted in Jeeva's car, intending to kill him before he can reach the courthouse. However, Jeeva forgets the crucial audiotape evidence, and his wife asks Kumaran to deliver it to him. Kumaran, along with Karan, catches up with Jeeva’s car, but when the bomb explodes, Kumaran is killed. Devastated, Jeeva allows Vaani to keep Kumaran’s ashes instead of dispersing them as per custom.

The police claims Kumaran's death was accidental. karan, captures two of the perpetrators and brings them to Jeeva, urging him to expose the truth. Jeeva, disillusioned by systematic corruption, initially refuses but is reinvigorated by Karan’s determination. Together, they establish a new newspaper, Mudhal Kural, to challenge the establishment.

As Vaani and Karan go out together, Vasu spots them. He becomes angry and confronts Jeeva, accusing him of misleading Vaani. Both Vaani and Jeeva cold shoulder him. Jeeva tries to bring Vaani in marriage with Karan. But Vaani appears in traditional widow's garb before Jeeva, his wife, and Karan's younger paternal uncle and aunt as they discuss the marriage. She fears that her ties with Jeeva and his wife will be severed if she remarries. The couple accept her decision with grief.

Vaani and Karan secretly record a conversation between Vasu and Mohana, revealing a ship scam. Vasu's men chase them, but they escape. Vinoth, their companion, takes only the camera as a distraction for Vasu's men and asks Vaani and Karan to bring the tape to Jeeva. Vinoth arrives at Jeeva’s office with bullet wounds, explaining that he allowed himself to be captured while Vaani and Karan fled into the forest. He urges Jeeva to save them. Jeeva approaches the inspector, who directs him to Mohana. Jeeva confronts her, offering to destroy the evidence in exchange for Vaani and Karan’s safety. Mohana mocks him and tells him to bring a petition. After a tense exchange, she orders her men to assault him.

Meanwhile, Vaani and Karan are captured by more henchmen, who torture them for the tape's location. While recovering in the hospital, Jeeva learns that his office was set on fire, and his wife is killed. He seeks out the inspector and kills him in retaliation. In the forest, Vaani manages to escape and attempts to rescue Karan from his torturers. She falls into the water, but Karan saves her, urging her to get the tape to the court. Jeeva calls Dina Madal from a phone booth and informs the sub-editor that, due to his ongoing confrontation with Mohana, he must remain undercover. This message is later published in the paper.

Mohana's partymen invite her for a wedding, and despite fearing Jeeva’s retaliation, she agrees to attend with heavy security. Meanwhile, Vasu, unaware that Vaani's and Karan's have escaped, orders one of his men to kill them for refusing to reveal the location of the tape.

Mohana arrives at the wedding under tight security. As she ascends the dais, the policemen assigned to protect her spot a suspicious man disguised as a godman. When they approach him, he flees but assaults a server, taking his place. After the wedding feast, Jeeva confronts Mohana and shoots her. Moments later, he is shot by the chief security officer in the ensuing chaos. Despite his injury, Jeeva sees Mohana attempting to escape through a glass exit. He throws an axe-like tool at the door, shattering the glass, which falls on Mohana, killing her. Jeeva is later brought to court, where the judge asks if he is responsible for the deaths of the inspector and Mohana. Jeeva asks the judge if responds by asking if figures like Krishna, Vanchinathan and Bhagat Singh can be considered murderers.

Meanwhile, Karan finds Vasu and strangles him. The film ends with Karan being arrested and taken to jail.

== Cast ==
- Sivaji Ganesan as Jeeva
- Arjun Sarja as Karan
- Kanaka as Vaani
- Vijayakumar as Veluthambi
- Anand as Kumaran
- Manjula as Mohanamba
- Jayabharathi
- Sreeja as Rekha
- Jai Ganesh as "Salpatta" Vasu
- Chinni Jayanth as Vinoth
- Charle
- Thennavan
- M. S. Bhaskar

== Production ==
To write dialogues for the film, V. C. Guhanathan approached Suba Veerapandian, his colleague in pro-Eelam activism and the younger brother of director S. P. Muthuraman, whom Guhanathan had introduced to Tamil cinema as director. Veerapandian initially hesitated but accepted the offer. He then partnered with his colleague, Peer Muhamad, and within about two weeks, wrote dialogues for approximately 60 scenes. At one point, Veerapandian and Guhanathan disagreed over the portrayal of the female lead after she becomes a widow. As a rationalist, Veerapandian argued that the heroine, who holds revolutionary ideals, need not be depicted in a white sari, the traditional attire of a Hindu widow. Guhanathan, however, maintained that "There are some sentiments pertaining to cinema. Women [in the audience] will not accept if we do as you say". Since Guhanathan was in charge of the production, Veerapandian chose not to press his point. However, in the film, Jeeva's character is seen questioning the relevance of widowhood rituals. This disagreement led to Veerapandian and Guhanathan ending their film partnership, deciding to collaborate only on pro-Eelam activities. Veerapandian also insisted on not being credited in the film, as only 10 of the 60 scenes he had written made it into the final script. After watching Kanaka's performance in Karakattakkaran (1989), Guhanathan and Veerapandian selected her to play the female lead, Vaani.

== Soundtrack ==
The soundtrack was composed by Chandrabose, with lyrics by Pulamaipithan.

Track listing
No.	Title	Singer(s)	Length
1.	"Unnaithan Azhaikkiren"	K. J. Yesudas, K. S. Chithra
2.	"Aaduvom"	K. J. Yesudas
3.	"Vachukka"	Malaysia Vasudevan, Lalitha Sagari
4.	"Thambi Paattukatti"	Malaysia Vasudevan
5.	"Uyiraithanthum"	K. J. Yesudas
6.	"Vettaikaranthane"	Malaysia Vasudevan

== Bibliography ==
- Veerapandian, Suba (2012). Vandhadhum Vaazhvadhum (in Tamil). Vaanavil. ISBN 9788192465814.
