= Meenakshi Sundaresvarar Temple, Arimalam =

Shiva temple in Tamil Nadu, India

Meenakshi Sundaresvarar Temple is a Hindu temple dedicated to the deity Shiva located at Arimalam of Pudukkottai district in Tamil Nadu, India.

== Location ==
This temple is located at Arimalam in Pudukkottai district. Ari means Chandra and mala means child. Due to a curse, the size of Chandra started reducing. After losing everything when Chandra came to this place, which was found with many umber of vilva trees, the deity of this place took and put the Chandra on his head. Then he got rid of the curse. Later he requested the deity that this place be called as Arimalam and so this place got the name. There is also another opinion that 'Arumpallam' became Arimalam in due course. In the shrine of Vilangiamman many number of Eralinji fruits were found and so this place was called as Arimalam.

== Presiding deity ==
The presiding deity of the temple is known as Sundaresvarar and the goddess is known as Meenakshi. From 19 to 21 March the rays of Sun fell on the presiding deity. Vidyavathi, the daughter of Gandharavan, started worshipping Shyamaladevi as her daughter. Due to her continuous worship she as a daughter of Surasenan came into existence. Later she married Malaiyatthuvaja Pandyan. As they did not have children, he conducted a yagna in which a three-year-old girl appeared. The king gave her the right to rule the country. She got the name of Meenakshi, as she satisfied the needs of the devotees. She also got the rare chance of seeing Shiva at Kailash. To marry her Shiva came to Madurai. After her marriage, she got the right of ruling Madurai and to satisfy the devotees she gave darshan to them in Arimalam also.

== Festivals ==
During the Tamil month of Chithirai, the float festival is held in a grand manner.

== Kumbhabhishekham ==
The Kumbhabhishekham of the temple was held during December 2018. Later special abhiseka was held to the presiding deity and the goddess. Annadanam was offered to the devotees. Celestial marriage of the deities and the procession of deities was held later.
