= Rise of Dravidian parties to power in Tamil Nadu =

1960s events in India politics

Dravidian parties rose to power and prominence in the political stage of Tamil Nadu, a state in India, in the 1960s. The rise in power and political support was gradual until Dravida Munnetra Kazhagam (DMK), a Dravidian party, formed the government in the state in 1967. Although since the 1970s the Dravidian parties have met with many break-aways and have taken rival stances against each other, the seat of power in Tamil Nadu has been with one or another Dravidian party. The increase in popularity of the Dravidian parties in the 1960s is attributed to several factors, including the fall of popularity of the Congress Government in the centre and the north–south disparity, as claimed by the Dravidian politics. The series of events climaxed with anti-Hindi agitation which led to the downfall of popularity of the then Indian National Congress government in the state and the eventual rise of Dravidian parties to power.

== Background ==
Dravidian parties include an array of regional political parties in the state of Tamil Nadu, which trace their origins and ideologies either directly or indirectly to the Dravidian movement of Periyar E. V. Ramasamy. The Dravidian parties have traditionally associated themselves with the Dravidian community and thus their primary goal was to achieve social equality and end the domination of North India on politics and economy of Tamil Nadu (a south Indian state). Although most Dravidian parties are offshoots of Dravidar Kazhagam (DK), there are a few other parties in Tamil Nadu that did not arise from DK directly. Nevertheless, both the former and the latter are considered as Dravidian parties because of the similarities of their ideals and goals. Dravida Munnetra Kazhagam (DMK) and its political rival All India Anna Dravida Munnetra Kazhagam (AIADMK) have been the major players of the Dravidian parties.

== Decline of Congress Party’s popularity ==
Immediately after Indian independence, the Congress party was popular and thus was electorally very successful, forming governments in most of the states including the Madras State. However, the popularity of the Congress government in Madras started to decline with its head Rajagopalachari proposing the Hereditary Education Policy, which the opposition parties saw as an attempt to perpetuate the social hierarchy of the caste system. Congress gained back some ground when K. Kamaraj, who was seen as a "man of the soil", took over. However, his resignation to assume the presidency of the All-India Congress Committee was detrimental to the state Congress since Kamaraj was much respected by the people, and even by political opponents of Congress including Periyar E. V. Ramasamy.

The resignation of Kamaraj was a cause of deeply declining popularity of Congress all over India and especially in Madras State. Kamaraj sensed that DMK was rapidly gaining popularity in the state and coupled with his fear of the fall of Congress-governments in several other states of India as well as the center instigated many other Congress leaders to relinquish cabinet positions. At one point even Jawaharlal Nehru volunteered to resign to strengthen the party, but was advised not to, given the sensitivity of the issue. After Nehru's death the Indian National Congress had weakened nationally. More than half of the population by then were under age 35 and represented the post-Gandhian era. Nevertheless, the reasons for the resentment found within the Indian masses were more to do with everyday life rather than just the political turmoil. There were food shortages in several parts of the country, and the state of Bihar was close to a famine. After Kamaraj's resignation, the next Chief Minister of Madras State, Bhakthavatchalam, didn't have the charm of his predecessor. Persistent charges of ministerial corruption tarnished the image of the Congress. The food scarcity in the state was seen as an artificial scarcity, the mixed product of administrative bungling and private hoarding. The scenario in Madras State, as observed by political analysts, was "frustration without coherence or direction, a revolutionary situation without revolutionists".

== North-South divide ==
The differences between North and South India, both as in languages as well as in social structure, were compounded in Tamil Nadu through the feeling that the nation was dominated by the North and that the South had been both neglected and exploited. The antipathy towards the North developed as the animosity against Sanskrit, which were twofold as hostility towards Hindi (a Sanskritic language) as well as Brahmin (as a proponent of Sanskrit). Brahminism was seen as the instrument of this "tyranny". Ritually and socially superior to the non-Brahmin masses, a Brahmin commanded a dominant political and economic position in Tamil Nadu. With the rise of Dravidar Kazhagam and birth of DMK, along with the ascent of Kamaraj in the Congress, the Brahmin dominance was already in the process of being displaced in the Madras State.

The north–south divide in India was more prominent in the 1960s with both the masses and the politicians of the North looking at English as a foreign language that has usurped the rightful place of indigenous languages, whereas the South feared that English would be replaced by Hindi, which is equally foreign to its tongues.

== Tamil renaissance and nationalism ==
Tamil had undergone a cultural renaissance in the 20th century shedding off Sanskrit influence on its language. This language revival had exposed the Tamils to the richness of their literature and more than two thousand years of history. It was seen by Tamils that Hindi, an undeveloped language, was being imposed on them. This renaissance, coupled with the new-found awareness of its uniqueness when compared to the Northern Indian languages, led to suspicion of anything that was Northern. Anti-Brahminism sentiments that had arisen further complicated the antipathy to the North, since it was seen by leaders like Periyar as an import from the North. Periyar and his DK, as did the DK's predecessor Justice Party, saw the British Raj as the only alternative to Brahmin dominance. The resultant Tamil nationalism had until then not been expressed as violence. Both under the British and in independent India the Tamils have had a somewhat privileged position, since they were much sought after as labour, partly because the standard of education and knowledge of English have been to some extent higher than elsewhere in India; consequently Tamils have secured a large share of appointments in government service and education. Perhaps because of this, Tamil linguistic feelings had never turned against English. As Tamils saw English not as a threat, but a tool for advancement and protection of their interest, replacing English with Hindi, even as a suggestion, provoked violently adverse reactions, in particular, amongst students. Thus the introduction of Hindi as a national language was seen as direct measure of the North to dominate the South culturally, economically, and politically. For them the use of English as an official language meant social equality where a Northerner and a Southerner start at a same point in English.

== Anti-Hindi agitations ==
=== Background ===
The major driving force of the anti-Hindi agitation was not the questioning of protecting Tamil, but questions of the future of Tamils. Hindi as a suitable candidate for the official language of India after independence was first proposed by the Motilal Nehru Report of 1928. An Official Language Commission appointed under the terms of the Constitution in 1955 to review the situation supported Hindi as the sole official language, although members from Bengal and Madras dissented in favour of English. As of the 1961 census, there were 1652 languages. Hindi as an official language was opposed for two reasons: the first because the numbers of people with knowledge of English were fairly evenly spread, and also that imposition of Hindi would give a major advantage in terms of job and educational possibilities to those who had Hindi as their mother tongue. In effect a Tamil who would desire to pursue union civil service would have to learn three languages, Tamil, Hindi and English, which are members of three different language families and each is written in a different script. Therefore, a three-language formula proposed was seen as a great educational burden imposed on non-Hindi-speaking states. Nehru promised in 1959 that the interests of the non-Hindi speakers would be safeguarded, and so did Lal Bahadur Shastri later, but those promises didn't put the fears of non-Hindi speakers to rest.

=== Rise of anti-Hindi sentiments ===
The support on opposition of Hindi as a national language by the education elite was well evident by the early 1960s where DMK, a champion of this cause, controlled corporations of all the major towns in the Madras State. As the time clocked down to 26 January 1965, the threshold for the end of use of English as official language, neither Nehru's promise nor the constitutional amendments of 1963 could calm the Tamil population, as it was obvious for them that moves to publicise Hindi as a language for civil service examinations were underway by the central government.

=== Three-language formula ===
The other southern states, Mysore State (now Karnataka), Andhra and Kerala, adopted a three-language formula where the students would be expected to study English, Hindi, and their regional language. While the north was keen on getting the southern curriculum with compulsory Hindi, it was demanded from the south that northern states take on a three-language policy for themselves too, with one of them being a Dravidian language. The northern states either refused to adopt a three-language formula, or wherever a three-language formula was implemented in the north, an option for taking Sanskrit was implemented, defeating the purpose of the policy itself.

=== Inaction of the state's Congress party ===
With the surging fears haunting the people of Madras, the Congress party of the state would do nothing bigger than a small demonstration and insisted to the people that there were no grounds for alarm. In contrast, DMK held an Anti-Hindi Conference in Trichirapalli on 17 January 1965. The conference was supported by all major opposition parties and funded by major wealthy industrialists – the industrialists who themselves feared of losing to influence of the North if Hindi were made the official language. The conference decided to hold 26 January (the fifteen anniversary of India's republic day) as a Day of Mourning. Madras State's Chief Minister Bhakthavatchalam declared a warning that the state government would not tolerate the sanctity of the Republic day blasphemed. Hence DMK advanced the day of mourning by two days, id est. on 24 January. Although no longer a day of mourning, plans of demonstration on the 26th were still underway. DMK and its then ally, Swatantara Party had asked its members to fly black flags in their homes on that day. Bhakthavatchalam declared that such acts would be considered traitorous.

=== Further North-South divide ===
Annadurai, who by now was trying hard to erase his party's secessionist image, proclaimed that the official slogan of the agitation would be "Down with Hindi; Long live the Republic" – in Tamil, "Hindi Ozhiga; Kudiyarasu Vāzhga". With tensions tightening in the South, some Northern states, such as Bihar, Madhya Pradesh, Rajasthan and Uttar Pradesh organised anti-English riots involving violence and lawlessness against government properties. Thus as the north–south divide further deepened, the stage was set for conflict between the Congress-led government and the opposition parties, but the scale and development of the conflict were expected by none.

=== Unfolding of events ===
24 January 1965, the day of mourning, would pass more peacefully than anticipated. Since Bhakthavatchalam had warned the students that their participation in politics wouldn't be tolerated, student associations had planned a day of demonstration throughout the state on 25 January, a day after the DMK's day of mourning. On the morning of the 25th, college students in Madurai assembled at the college gate, shouted slogans against Hindi imposition and burnt an effigy of "Hindi demoness". As they left in procession chanting slogans they were joined by students of other colleges. When the students approached the Congress Party district office, which lay on the route, some Congress volunteers who had arrived in a Jeep shouted insults and obscenities at the students. A volley of sandals from the students returned the insult. The provoked Congress volunteers, who ran back into the Party's office, returned with knives and attacked the students, wounding seven. As the riot broke out, students set fire to the pandal in the Congress office, constructed for the Republic day celebrations. A procession which should have been an otherwise peaceful demonstration, sparked into two-month-long riots throughout the state. Some unofficial reports place figures on the number of deaths close to three hundred. Some students poured gasoline and immolated themselves. The brutality of police firing and lathi-charges only deepened the resentment. Two policemen were beaten to death by a mob near Coimbatore, and in the state capital, Madras, a mob set fire to railway cars and looted stores.

Robert Hardgrave Jr, professor of humanities, government and Asian studies, suggests that the elements contributing to the riots were not majorly instigated by DMK or leftists or even the industrialists, as the Congress government of the state suggested, but were genuine frustrations and discontentment which lay beneath the surface of the people of the state. While some industrialists funded student movements and the opposition parties (DMK and Swatantara party) helped move it politically, it is well observed that agitation was a spontaneous reaction, which directly reflected the anger of the common people, especially the students.

As if the embarrassment of high involvement of the commoner in the agitations were not enough for the Congress, Baktavatsalam further added fuel to fire by claiming that he possessed documents proving the involvement of DMK in instigating violence, the documents which he could never publish.

== DMK's involvement in anti-Hindi agitation ==
Although Annadurai had asked students to return to classes and leave the agitation, some high-profile leaders in DMK were still active and popular among the students. One of them was Karunanidhi, who was later arrested and attained a status of "martyred hero". However, although the party did not instigate the violence directly, it had prepared the scene rather by accident, by nurturing the antipathy of the South to the North. Nevertheless, the Anti Hindi agitation and the popularity gained through it aided DMK to a great extent to win the 1967 general elections.

== Dravidian parties in power ==
=== Dravida Munnetra Kazhagam ===
When the fourth General Elections (1967) were announced in India, the nation was in a severe state of crisis, both politically and economically. Some, according to reports, suggested that the election be postponed or even abandoned. The Times (London) had referred to the election as "the fourth – and surely last – general election". Although the political elite would counter the critics by calling it the "first true general elections that India witnessed", the wheel of fortune in the political scenario in India was rapidly changing. It can be noted that the DMK was one of the two parties (the other being the Muslim League) to win all the seats it contested in the national elections, winning 25 of 25 (the Muslim League won 3 of 3) and emerged as the third major opposition party in the Indian Parliament. Kamaraj, who was the President of the Congress party then, himself lost to a little known "student leader" in his home constituency. The DMK had garnered more than 6 million votes in the state assembly, winning 138 out of 173 seats it contested. The electoral victory in 1967 is also attributed to an electoral fusion among the non-Congress parties to avoid a split in the opposition votes. Rajagopalachari, a former senior leader of the Congress party, had by then left the Congress and launched the right-wing Swatantra Party. He played a vital role in bringing about the electoral fusion among the opposition parties to align themselves against the Congress.

=== All India Anna Dravida Munnetra Kazhagam ===
The All India Anna Dravida Munnetra Kazhagam is an Indian regional political party with great influence in the state of Tamil Nadu and the union territory of Puducherry. It is a Dravidian party founded by the former chief minister of Tamil Nadu M. G. Ramachandran (M.G.R.) at Madurai on 17 October 1972 as a breakaway faction from the Dravida Munnetra Kazhagam after M. Karunanidhi expelled him from the party for demanding an account as the party treasurer. The party is adhering to the policy of socialism and secularism based on the principles of C. N. Annadurai (Anna) collectively coined as Annaism by M.G.R.
