= Thozhar Thiyagu =

Social activist, politician, writer

Thiyagu
- Born: 30 January 1950 (age 75); Thiruvarur, Madras State (now Tamil Nadu), India
- Occupation: Poet; Social Activist; Political activist
- Spouse: Thamarai

Krishnasami Thiagarajan (born 30 January 1950), popularly known as Thozhar Thiyagu, is a socio-political activist and writer from Tamil Nadu, India. He is also the General Secretary of Tamil National Liberation Movement and is well known for his proficiency in Marxist ideology.

== Early life ==
The native of Thiyagu is Nallampur, near Chandrasekarapuram. His father worked as a teacher at Thiruvarur, where Thiyagu was born and brought up. He grew up listening to the speeches of "Periyar" E.V. Ramasamy, C.N. Annadurai, P. Jeevanandham and K. Kamaraj at the general meetings held at Thiruvarur. He had a habit of reading all the DMK, Congress and Tamil National journals.

== Introduction to politics ==
In 1965 his family moved to Valangaiman. There, Thiyagu joined a typing school where he met Mr. Ameerjohn, who ran the typing school. Ameerjohn, who was against the caste system not only changed Thiyagu into an Atheist but also influenced his way of thinking. At that time, leaders like Kuthusi Gurusamy who had split up from Periyar's self-respect movement. When Thiyagu attended the first convention organised by them with Mr. Ameerjohn, they bought books written by Karl Marx and Lenin. It was at this time when, Thiyagu was first introduced to Marxism.

== Congress experience ==
While Thiyagu was getting impressed by the thoughts of communist books he was reading, he delivered his first speech at the Indian National Congress general meeting in 1965. Since Congress lost the election held in 1967, National Students’ Tamil Development Team was formed under the motivation from Kamaraj. To speak in its general meeting, Thiyagu went to Madras for the first time. In that meeting, he spoke out his ideas with clarity and without any fear even though Kamaraj, Kannadasan, Jayakandan and other popular people were present on the stage. This incident impressed Kamaraj and he ordered Thiyagu to deliver introductory speech wherever the convention was held thereafter.

== Communist orientation ==
Thiyagu who was completely impressed by communist ideology realized that Congress is a bourgeois party and it would never allow communism or equal rights. In an interview published in Liberation, the leader of Naxalite movement and the General Secretary of Communist Party of India (Marxist–Leninist), Charu Mazumdar had said "Students have to quit studies, renounce family, and move to villages to create an armed revolution. Annihilation is our only slogan". The annihilation policy of the Communist party of India(Marxist–Leninist), which rejected by the Communist Party of India and Communist Party of India (Marxist), impressed Thiyagu. At that time, the Keezhvenmani massacre also made a big impact on him. In order to destroy the oppressors who were upper caste zamindars, he quit his college and left his home in 1969 to join the Naxalite movement.

== Imprisonment ==
Thiyagu was involved in annihilation activities together with the comrades and was imprisoned at the age of 19. In 1971, before the release of a court ruling, he tried to escape the prison with his comrades. Their aim was to send a message to the party that they were not tired even though they were in jail. His death sentence was later reduced to life imprisonment. Even when he was in jail, he joined other comrades and continued to fight for their rights. He continued many activities through "Prisoners Welfare Rights Union" and "Literacy Movement". During his time in prison, Thiyagu began to read more of Lenin’s writings and started to realize the failure of the impractical annihilation policy of the Communist Party of India(M-L).

== Translation of Das Kapital ==
Thiyagu while in jail translated the first part of the book Das Kapital, written by Karl Marx. In accordance with the request of Balasubramaniam, he started translating the remaining two parts of Das Kapital in January, 1980 which he completed in the month of November. The entire translation was published by NCBH and got a good response. In 1983, when the Eelam struggle became stronger, there were major upheavals in jail as well. At that time, Thiyagu incarcerated at the Trichy jail, held a procession with 1500 prisoners supporting the Eelam struggle. Thiyagu, who joined the Communist Party of India (Marxist) while in prison was released at the end of November 1985.

== Political activities ==
Thiyagu courageously pointed out Communist Party of India (Marxist)'s wrong policies related to Eelam. On 15 September 1987, Thileepan began his hunger strike in Eelam. Thiyagu and some of his friends began "Thileepan Forum" to support him. At the meeting held on that day, Thiyagu explained about Eelam struggle in detail to the people. He did not hesitate to critique his party’s wrong views about the Eelam struggle. The next day, he was expelled from the Communist Party of India (Marxist). In January 1994, Thiyagu and Suba. Veerapandian began the "Tamil Tamilar Movement". Later, Tamil National Liberation Movement emerged from it. Four organisations including Tamil Tamilar Movement, and Tamil National Communist Party formed Tamil National Front. This movement had vigorously carried out various protests on Tamil Nadu’s key issues like Cauvery river water dispute issue and Mullai Periyar issue. When Tamil National Liberation movement was formed, "Social justice Tamil Nation" was proposed as the slogan. The aim of the organisation was to carry out Tamil National Politics inclusive social justice.

== After genocide ==
In 2009, at the end of Eelam war, after Mullivaikal massacre, when most of the movements and parties believed that Prabhakaran would come back and Eelam war would move to the next phase, Thiyagu was the one who realized and published that the LTTE’s role is over in Eelam war and Eelam struggle had moved to the next phase. At the peak of the Eelam war, Thiyagu realized that Tamil Nadu was not able to strangle the Indian government to stop the war, due to the lack of a strong Tamil National Movement with a mass following.

== Thaai Tamil School ==
As an initiative to build Tamil National feeling among people, Thiyagu started the first Thai Tamil School on 7 June 1993 and such schools are functioning all over Tamil Nadu and have a good reputation among people. The principal political purpose of these schools is to feed in Tamil sentiment among the children, thereby configuring the base for the Tamil National sentiment.

== Success or martyrdom ==
In the Eelam post-war period, when various political movements are stuck in identity forms of protests, Thiyagu has begun fast unto death, to bring uprising among Tamils, from 1 October 2013 emphasizing requests that include Sri Lanka should be removed from commonwealth organisation, commonwealth convention should not be held in the soil of genocide; if it happens, India should not be part of that, with the slogan "Success or Martyrdom".

== See also ==
- Pazha Nedumaran
- Senthamizhan Seeman
