= Thunive Thunai =

- Theatrical release poster
- Directed by: S. P. Muthuraman
- Written by: Panchu Arunachalam
- Produced by: P. V. Thulasiraman
- Starring: Jaishankar; Jayaprabha; S. A. Ashokan; Rajasulochana; Vijayakumar
- Cinematography: Babu (S. I. C. A)
- Edited by: R. Vittal
- Music by: M. S. Viswanathan
- Production company: P. V. T. Productions
- Release date: 13 April 1976
- Running time: 137 minutes
- Country: India
- Language: Tamil

Thunive Thunai (transl. Fortitude is protection) is a 1976 Indian Tamil-language action thriller film, directed by S. P. Muthuraman and written by Panchu Arunachalam. The film stars Jaishankar, Jayaprabha and Rajasulochana, with S. A. Ashokan, Suruli Rajan and S. V. Ramadas in supporting roles. It was released on 13 April 1976, and became a box office hit.

== Plot ==
The Movie starts with the police asking help from CID officer Vijaykumar(Vijaykumar) to visit Ponvayal village, to investigate a mystery happening around the village. During his train journey, a stranger boards the train and warns him to go back since the village ponvayal is dangerous and anyone apart from the villagers who go there will face the wrath of the village goddess. The stranger fights with him and jumps from the train.

Upon arrival, he visits the station master room in which an old man who wears the station master uniform welcomes him and repeat the same dialogue said by the stranger. And he tells a story about his late son (who is the stranger), how he died during a train journey placing a bet and that he roams the place as a ghost as said by people of the village. Hearing this story Vijaykumar is terrified and hurries off, when he come across another station master he enquires about the old station master to him, who says the old master is dead and heard the people say his ghost roams here since he died by suicide in that room, he gets scared.

Even though horrified Vijaykumar sets to the village in a bullock cart, when a woman in white saree crosses them singing a song "aagayathil thotil ketti" he tries to follow the women, but she disappears mysteriously. Whilereturning, he finds the bullock cart driver lying dead on the ground, seeing that he gets petrified and dies of shock. Hearing the death news of his brother Vijaykumar, Anandh also a fellow CBI officer decides to visit the village himself since he is doubtful that there's uncertainty in his brother's death. The same events follow during Anandh's arrival. He avoids all the attempts to scare him smartly, being cautious.

Finally when he arrives to the village some goons try to scare him off, which he doesn't mind and carries off. Hungry he visits a restaurant, where they refuse to serve him food and instead insult and send him back. No shop owner gives him anything, even the kids don't give him water for thirst. At the verge of hunger, he begs the goons, but they don't mind his pleas, a girl Prabha (Jayaprabha) daughter of the village head Singaram gives him food.

At night Anandh visits Prabha and seeks her help in building a tent. All the attempts of the goons trying to scare him fail. Anandh tries hard and gains help from one of the henchmen Babu from the goons gang. Through his help, he escapes from the near-death attempt made on him by the goons, after he learns the gang does illegal business by selling statues of god. Everyone believes he is dead. Taking advantage of this he arrives to the village as Dhayal, an international gangster, and announces to the goons, that he came in search of Anandh to avenge him for his arrest. The goons tell him he is dead, but Dhayal refuses to believe them and ask them to show his dead body. Seeing the body missing the goons believe he has escaped. Before the whole village, he stages a drama which he and Anandh are two different people and kill him. Later it is revealed that the one who acted as Anandh is his fellow officer helping him.

Seeing Dhayal killing a CBI officer, the gang, inspired by his boldness, takes him to their cave where they introduce him to their leader (Raja Sulochana) whom they address as Thalaivi. She keeps some tests to check his originality, in which he succeeds.

After some turns of events Dhayal marries Prabha, which she initially opposes but later accepts, learning he is Anandh imposing as Dhayal. Seeing her sudden change in acceptance of Dhayal, Thalaivi is impressed by Dhayal falls for him, and trying to woo him. Later that night, Anandh informs the police about the illegal activities done by the gang and asks them to arrive immediately.

However, Thalaivi finds out that he is not the original Dhayal and imprisons Anandh, Prabha, Babu, and flees the village along with all the people from the village. Anandh escapes and with the help of some people chases the whole gang.

The movie ends with the arrest of the whole gang by Anandh with the help of the police.

== Cast ==
- Jaishankar as CID Anand and Dhayal
- Jayaprabha as Prabha (debut)
- Vijayakumar as CID Vijaykumar
- Rajasulochana as Madam, Smuggler's Head
- S. A. Ashokan as Coffin Maker, Madam's Henchman
- S. V. Ramadoss as Hotel Manager, Madam's Henchman
- K. Kannan as Coffin Maker's Younger Brother, Madam's Henchman
- Senthamarai as landlord Singaram, Madam's Henchman
- Suruli Rajan as Babu
- Vennira Aadai Moorthy as Forest Ranger, Madam's Henchman
- Aparna as Radha
- Kallapart Natarajan as Smuggler, Madam's Henchman
- Pakoda Kadhar as Villager
- Peeli Sivam as Station Master
- P. S. Venkatachalam as Old Man

== Production ==
P. V. Thulasiraman, a silk merchant from Salem approached Muthuraman to make a film for which Muthuraman agreed and chose Jaishankar as the protagonist which eventually became Thunive Thunai. Panchu Arunachalam wrote the film's story and dialogues, he called this the first Tamil film revolving around an underworld don. Jaishankar insisted that this film should be made completely in colour, thus it became the first colour film directed by Muthuraman.

For the climax scene involving helicopter chase, the crew bought a helicopter used for spraying pesticides from Southern Aviation Corporation. The scene which was shot in Kovalam Beach and near Mamallapuram took two days to be completed. Some scenes were shot at Modern Theatres, Salem.

== Soundtrack ==
Soundtrack was composed by M. S. Viswanathan and lyrics were by Kannadasan.

Song	Singer	Length
"Agayathil Thottil Katti"	Vani Jayaram	03:34
"Aranga Nayaki"	Vani Jayaram, B. S. Sasirekha	05:24
"Acham Ennai Nerungathu"	T. M. Soundararajan, S. P. Balasubrahmanyam	05:42
"Kaiyil Poo Eduppom"	L. R. Eswari, L. R. Anjali	04:26

== Release and reception ==
Thunive Thunai was released on 13 April 1976. Kanthan of Kalki praised the performance of Jaishankar, Babu's cinematography and added although there are many incidents that happen as told, the film is enjoyable to watch and called it a boldly made film. Naagai Dharuman of Navamani praised the acting, dialogues, cinematography and direction.

== Bibliography ==
- Muthuraman, S. P. (2017) [2005]. AVM Thandha SPM (in Tamil) (3rd ed.). Vikatan. OCLC 607342391.
