= Pattukkottai Alagiri =

Indian social reformer (1900–1949)

- Born: Pattukkottai Alagiri; 23 June 1900; Karukkakurichi, Pudukkottai State, British India (now in Pudukkottai district, Tamil Nadu, India)
- Died: 28 March 1949 (aged 48); Thanjavur, Madras Province, Dominion of India (now Tamil Nadu, India)
- Other names: Thalapathy; Anjanenjan
- Occupation: Social reformer
- Known for: Anti-Hindi agitations of Madras (1937–1940)
- Spouse: Ethirajamma (m. 1927)
- Children: 5

Pattukkottai Alagiri (23 June 1900 – 28 March 1949), popularly known as Anjanenjan Alagiri, was an Indian social reformer. He was a prominent leader in Self-Respect Movement and Dravidar Kazhagam.

== Early life ==
Pattukkottai Alagiri was born on 23 June 1900 to Vasudeva Naidu and Kannamma, in Karukkakurichi, Keeramangalam in the Pudukkottai State. He belonged to the Gavara Naidu community. His father served in the British Indian Army. He was a descendant of the Royal Family of Kandy. He attended American College Higher Secondary School in Madurai. He had participated in World War I.

== Personal life ==
Alagiri was married to Ethirajamma in 1927. The couple had two sons, Ramamoorthy, Dilip Alagiri and three daughters, Diana, Baby and Pushparani. His brother in law K. G. Sukku Rajasinha was a great-grandson of Sri Vikrama Rajasinha, the last king of Kandy.

== Politics ==
On 3 June 1938, the first anti-Hindi protest was held in Saidapet, Madras, led by Maraimalai Adigal. Pattukottai Azhagirisamy, the chief propagandist of the Self-Respect Movement, led a march all over the state in protest against the imposition of Hindi.

He conferred the title of "Kalaignar" on Karunanidhi and conferred the title of "Nadigavel" on M. R. Radha.

== Honours ==
Pattukkottai Alagiri statue

Pattukkottai Alagiri Memorial

- The Tamil Nadu Government constructed a memorial hall for Pattukkottai Alagiri.
- Tamil Nadu State Transport Corporation, Vellore Division is named the Pattukottai Azhagiri Transport Corporation after him.
- A statue has been erected in Pattukkottai in his honour which is often used as a focal point for public.
- Karunanidhi named his son M. K. Alagiri after him.
- Pattukkottai Alagiri's birth anniversary is celebrated as a government function.
- The Tamil Nadu Government has named a bus stand after him.
- The Tamil Nadu Government has named Alagiri Nagar, Thiruvarur after him.
- Pattukottai Alagiri Matriculation Higher Secondary School, Papanasam, is named after him.
- S. A. Ganesan named his son Alagiri after him.

== Death ==
He died of tuberculosis on 28 March 1949.

On 30 March 1949, Periyar wrote a tribute to Pattukkottai Alagiri on Viduthalai newspaper.
