= S. P. Muthuraman =

Indian film director

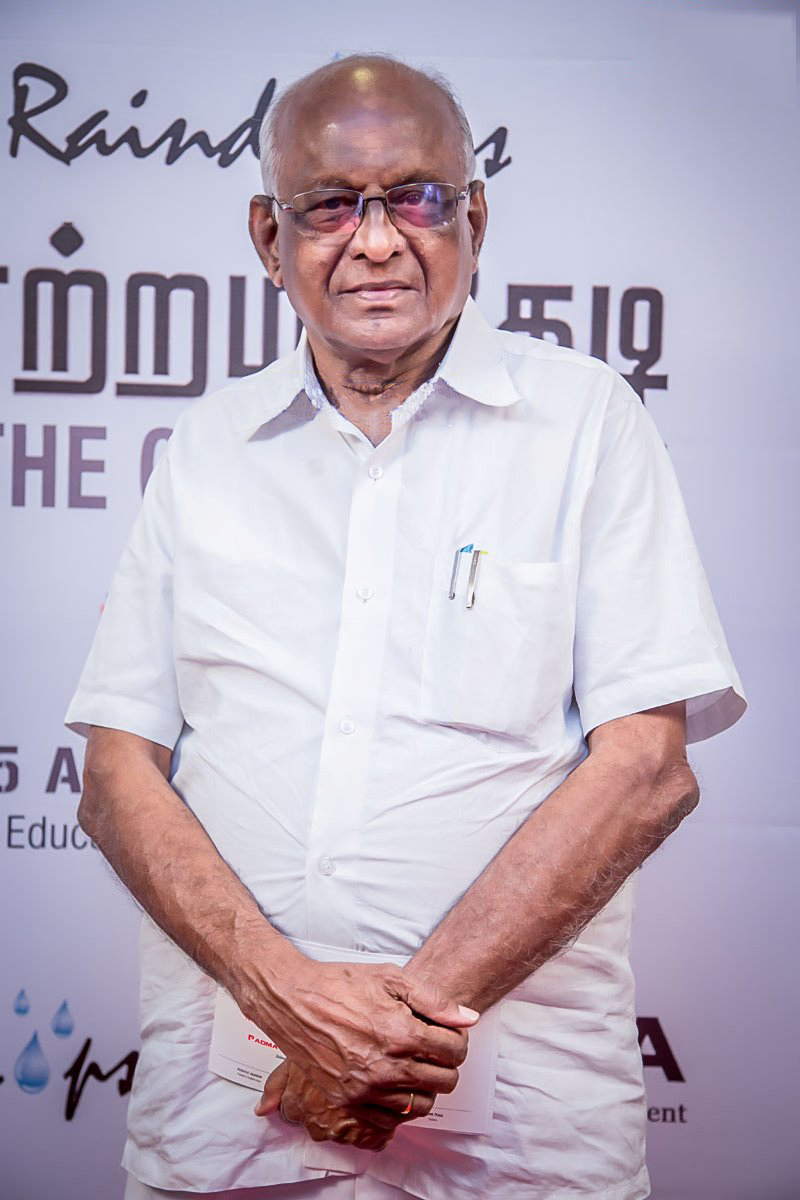
- Born: 7 April 1935 (age 91); Karaikudi, Pudukkottai State, British India, (now in Tamil Nadu, India)
- Occupations: Film Director, Producer
- Years active: 1972–1995 (Movies); 1997 (TV Series)
- Spouse: Kamala (m. 1957; died 1992)
- Children: 3
- Parent(s): Rama Subbaiah; Visalatchi
- Relatives: Suba Veerapandian (younger brother)

Subbiah Palaniappan Muthuraman, also referred to as SPM, is an Indian film director who works in the Tamil film industry. He has directed 72 films in Tamil. He was one of the most successful commercial directors in Tamil cinema. Initially he worked mainly with R. Muthuraman, Jaishankar, Sivaji Ganesan and went on to direct successful films with Rajinikanth and Kamal Haasan.

S. P. Muthuraman debuted as an assistant director in the film Kalathur Kannamma (1960). He has received two South Filmfare Awards and a Best Director award from the Tamil Nadu State Government.

Since 1977, his association with Rajinikanth proved to be extremely successful, as they went on work together in 25 films. Muthuraman was mainly responsible for moulding Rajini's career and turning him into a commercial star. He was also the associate producer of the Rajinikanth starrer Sivaji.

== Early life and family ==
Muthuraman was born on 7 April 1935 as the second of seven children in a family in Karaikudi. As per the norms in their region, Muthuraman's parents gave him another name - Rajaram Mohan - which became obsolete over time. His father Karaikudi Rama. Subbaiah was one of the forerunners of the Dravidian Movement and a member of the erstwhile Tamil Nadu Legislative Council during 1972-78. Muthuraman's youngest brother is the Dravidian ideologue Suba Veerapandian.

== Career ==
After working as office boy to assistant editor for Thendral magazine owned by Kannadasan, Muthuraman initially dreamt of becoming a screenwriter and expressed his interest to join story department in AVM Productions but Meiyappan insisted him to join editing department to learn the craft of filmmaking thus he started his film career through AVM Productions as an assistant editor, then an assistant director to the duo Krishnan–Panju, eventually working with A. Bhimsingh, D. Yoganand, Puttanna Kanagal, M. Krishnan Nair and A. C. Tirulokchandar.

== Personal life ==
He married Kamala in 1957. The couple have 3 children. His wife Kamala died on 15 October 1992 before the release of his 70th film, Pandiyan.

== Other works ==
Muthuraman wrote a weekly column for The Hindu Tamil named Cinema Eduththu Paar; all articles were later published as a single book in paperback format.

== Awards ==
Filmfare Awards South

- 1977 – Best Director – Tamil for Oru Oodhappu Kan Simittugiradhu
- 1978 – Best Director – Tamil for Bhuvana Oru Kelvi Kuri

Tamil Nadu State Film Awards

- 1979 – Best Director for Aarilirunthu Arubathu Varai
- 2012 – Lifetime Achievement Award – South
- 2018 - Lifetime Achievement Award - South

== Filmography ==
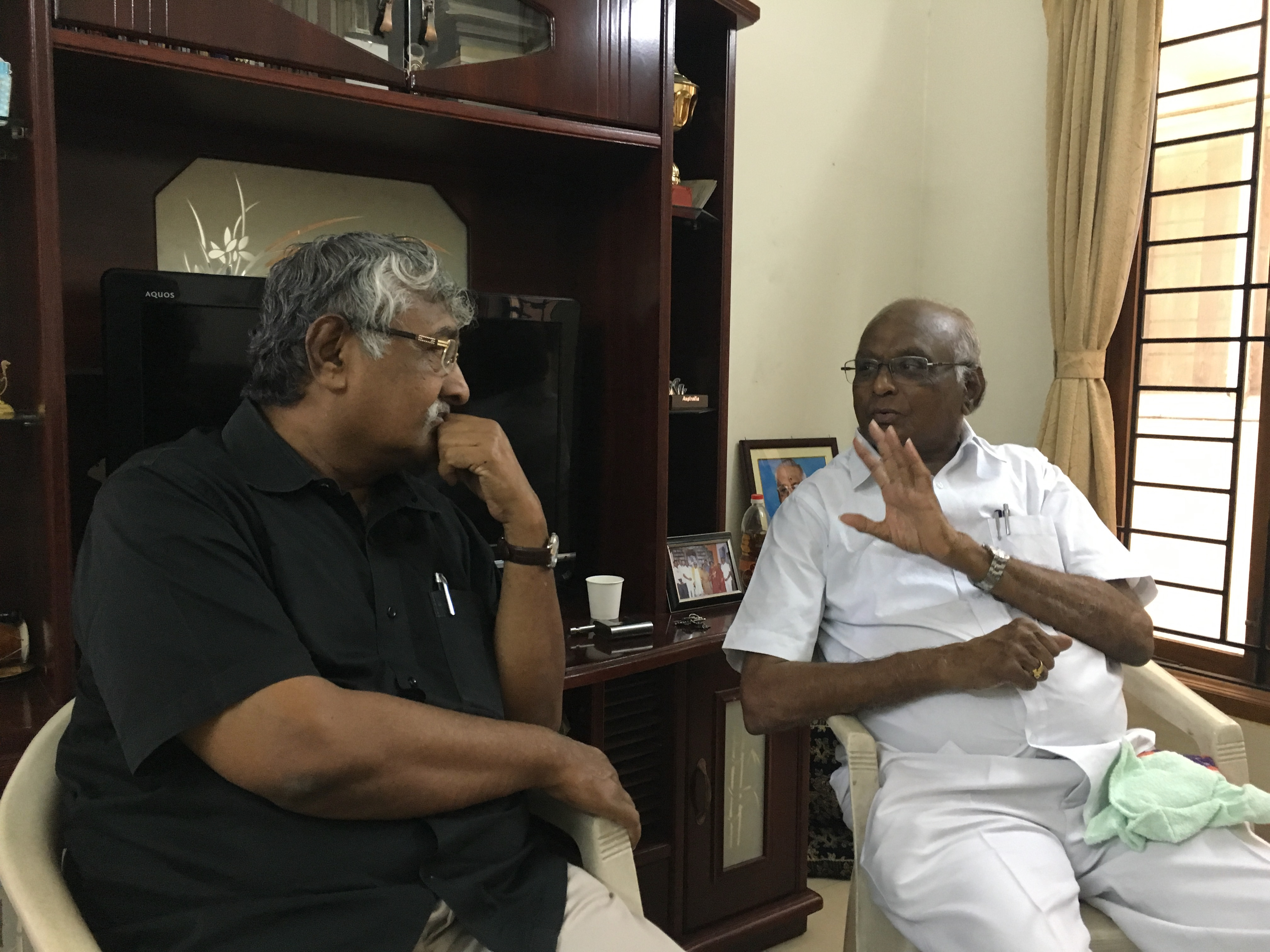
Muthuraman with Suba Veerapandian (left) in 2016.

=== As director ===
Year	Film	Notes
1972	Kanimuthu Paappa	
1973	Petha Manam Pithu	
1973	Kasi Yathirai	
1973	Deiva Kuzhandhaigal	
1974	Engamma Sapatham	
1974	Anbu Thangai	
1975	Yarukku Mappillai Yaro	
1975	Mayangukiral Oru Maadhu	
1975	Aan Pillai Singam	
1976	Thunive Thunai	
1976	Kaalangalil Aval Vasantham	
1976	Oru Oodhappu Kan Simittugiradhu	Filmfare Award for Best Director – Tamil
1976	Oru Kodiyil Iru Malargal	
1976	Mogam Muppadhu Varusham	
1977	Sonthamadi Nee Enakku	
1977	Pennai Solli Kutramillai	
1977	Bhuvana Oru Kelvi Kuri	Filmfare Award for Best Director – Tamil
1977	Aadu Puli Attam	
1977	Aalukkoru Aasai	
1978	Kaatrinile Varum Geetham	
1978	Vattathukkul Chaduram	25th Film
1978	Sakka Podu Podu Raja	
1978	Priya	Made simultaneously in Kannada as Priya
1979	Kavari Maan	
1979	Kadavul Amaitha Medai	
1979	Oru Koyil Iru Dheebangal	
1979	Aarilirunthu Arubathu Varai	Tamil Nadu State Film Award for Best Director
1979	Vetrikku Oruvan	
1980	Rishi Moolam	
1980	Murattu Kaalai	
1981	Kazhugu	
1981	Netrikkan	
1981	Ranuva Veeran	
1981	Kudumbam Oru Kadambam	
1982	Pokkiri Raja	
1982	Pudukavithai	
1982	Enkeyo Ketta Kural	
1982	Sakalakala Vallavan	
1983	Paayum Puli	
1983	Oru Kai Pappom	
1983	Adutha Varisu	
1983	Thoongathey Thambi Thoongathey	
1984	Naan Mahaan Alla	
1984	Oorukku Upadesam	
1984	Nallavanukku Nallavan	
1984	Enakkul Oruvan	
1985	Nalla Thambi	
1985	Ammavum Neeye Appavum Neeye	
1985	Uyarndha Ullam	50th Film
1985	Sri Raghavendrar	
1985	Japanil Kalyanaraman	
1986	Mr. Bharath	
1986	Dharma Devathai	
1987	Samsaram Oka Chadarangam	Telugu film
1987	Velaikaran	
1987	Per Sollum Pillai	
1987	Manithan	
1988	Guru Sishyan	
1988	Nallavan	
1988	Dharmathin Thalaivan	
1989	Raja Chinna Roja	
1990	Guru Sishyulu	Telugu film
1990	Ulagam Pirandhadhu Enakkaga	
1990	Athisaya Piravi	
1990	Thiyagu	
1991	Thaiyalkaran	
1991	Jeevana Chadarangam	Telugu film
1992	Kaaval Geetham	
1992	Pandian	70th Movie
1995	Thottil Kuzhandhai	Last film

=== TV series ===
1997	Nimmadhi Ungal Choice

== Bibliography ==
- Muthuraman, S. P. (2017) [2005]. AVM Thandha SPM (in Tamil) (3rd ed.). Vikatan.
