= Moovalur Ramamirtham =

Tamil social reformer

- Born: 1883; Thiruvarur, Madras Presidency, British India (now Tamil Nadu, India)
- Died: 1962 (aged 78–79)
- Organisation: DMK
- Movement: Dravidian movement, Tamil Nationalism

Moovalur Ramamirtham (1883–1962) was a Tamil social reformer, author, and political activist of the Dravidian Movement, who worked for the abolition of the Devadasi system in the Madras Presidency.

== Early life ==
Ramamirtham was born in 1883 in Thiruvarur, Madras Presidency, to a poor family. Father was Krishnaswamy, from Tiruvarur. Mother's name was Sinnamal. After Krishnaswamy had deserted the family, Sinnamal moved to Moovalur (a village near Mayuram (now Mayiladhuthurai), when child Ramamirtham was aged three. The young child was sold to a devadasi woman, by Sinnamal, for an old cloth and ten rupees. Ramamirtham was brought up in the devadasi household, and when she reached her teens opted to 'marry' her young music-dance teacher, against her adopted family wishes. As a consequence, Ramamirtham was falsely accused of killing a young woman, in a murder case. To retrieve her dignity, Ramamirtham did search and find the 'killed young woman' on her own, and made her to file a case against her oppressors. By exhibiting such a courage, Ramamirtham came to be noticed and recognized in the locality.

== Activism ==
Originally a supporter of the Indian National Congress (INC), she became a member of 'Periyar' E. V. Ramasamy's Self-Respect Movement after the latter left the Congress in 1925.

In 1930, she supported Muthulakshmi Reddi's failed attempt to abolish the Devadasi system in the Presidency through legislation.

In 1936, she authored a novel Dasigalin Mosavalai alladhu madhi pettra minor (lit. The Dasis' Web of Deceit, or The Playboy Grown Wise) which exposed the plight of the Devadasis.

She took part in the Anti-Hindi agitations of 1937-40 and in November 1938, was jailed for six weeks for participating in the agitations.

In 1949, she parted ways with Periyar, and became a supporter of the Dravida Munnetra Kazhagam (DMK) party started by Periyar's protégé C. N. Annadurai. She remained a DMK supporter till her death in 1962.

== Legacy ==
The public awareness created by her novel and her continuous campaign to abolish the Devadasi system, were instrumental in the passage of the Madras Devadasi (Prevention of Dedication) Act or the Devadasi Abolition Bill, which outlawed the practice in 1947.

In her memory, the Government of Tamil Nadu in 1989 instituted the "Moovalur Ramamirtham Ammal Ninaivu Marriage Assistance Scheme," a social welfare scheme to provide financial assistance to poor women.

== In popular culture ==
Ramamirtham is portrayed by Vennira Aadai Nirmala in the biopic Periyar (2007).
