= S. Ilakkuvanar =

S. Ilakuvan (1910–1973) was a Tamil college professor, principal. He has written many books including Tolgaphiam (translation to English) and (Tamil: என் வாழ்கைப்போர், Eṉ Vālkkaippōr, "My Life's War") in 1971.

Ilakuvan, who Tamilized his given Sanskritic name, states: "They may ask what’s in a name. One’s name is everything. Tamilians should only bear Tamil names. Those who refuse this cannot be devotees of Tamil" (Ilakuvanar 1971: 4). Today, of course, many Tamil speakers, and not just those overtly devoted to the language, bear personal names containing the word "Tamil," such as Tamilcelvi, "daughter of Tamil" Tamilanban, "lover of Tamil" Tamilarasi, "Queen Tamil" even Tamilpitthan, "mad about Tamil."

He gave Tamil the appraisal of (Tamil: உயர்தனிச்செம்மொழி, uyartaṉic cemmoḻi, "The higher and unuique classical language"). He also coined the phrase Tamil: தமிழ்ப்போரே எனது வாழ்கை போர், tamiḻppōr enatu wāḻkai pōr, "The war for Tamil is the war for my life").
