= Tiruchirappalli Central Prison =

Prison in Tiruchirappalli, India

- Location in Tamil Nadu Tiruchirappalli Central Prison (India)
- Location: Tiruchirapalli; 10.779565°N 78.708447°E
- Security class: Central Prison
- Capacity: 2,517
- Managed by: Tamil Nadu Prison Department

Tiruchirapalli Central Prison is located in Tiruchirapalli, India. The prison was built during 1865. The prison complex occupies an area comprising 289.10 acres (1.1699 km^{2}). It is authorised to accommodate 2517 prisoners.

== Notable prisoners ==
- Subhash Kapoor
