= Shamiana =

Tent or place for function or event

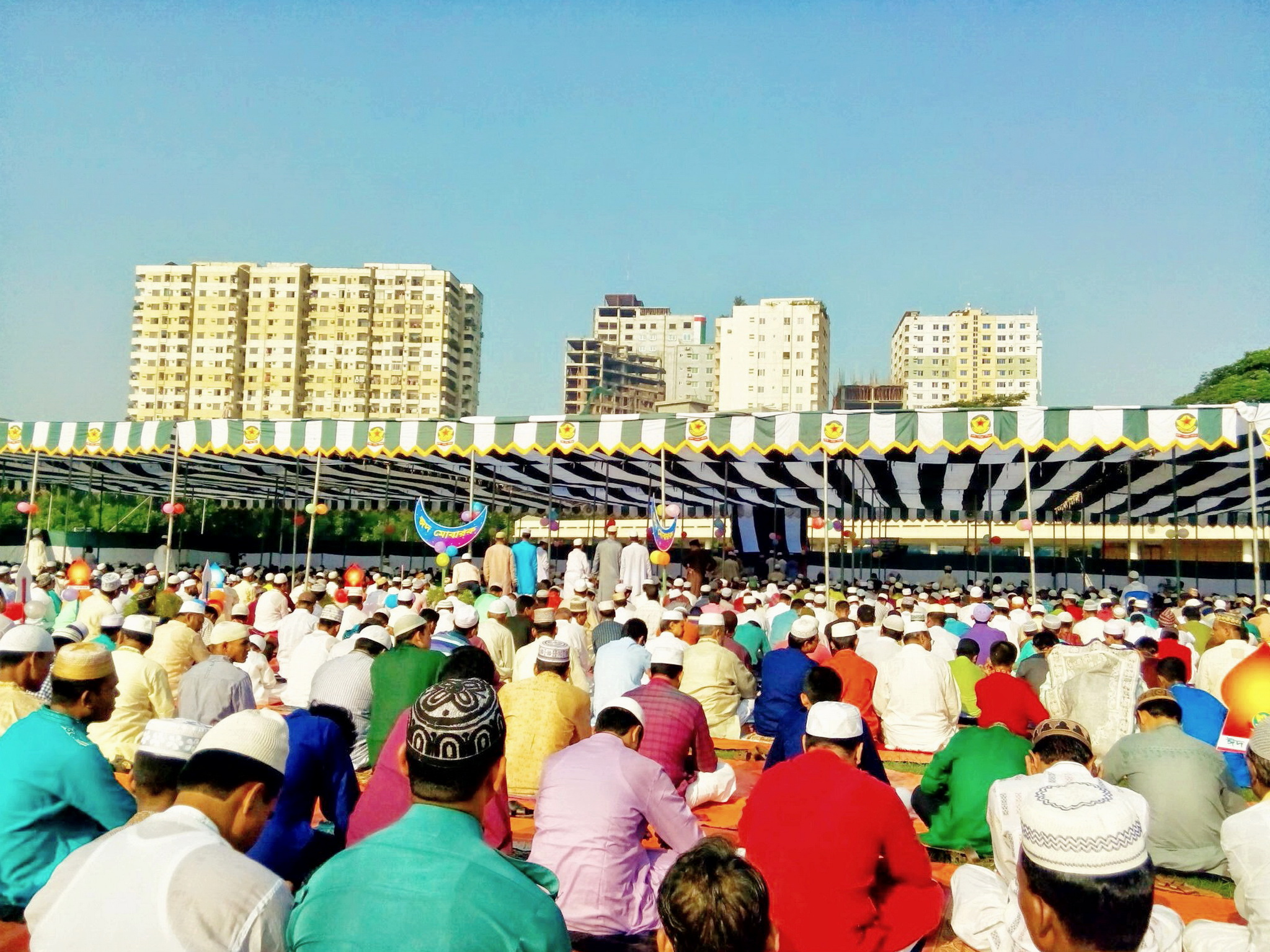
Traditional Shamiana decorated in the occasion of Eid prayers and Celebration in Bangladesh

A shamiana (Bengali: শামিয়ানা, Urdu: شامیانہ) is a South Asian ceremonial tent, shelter or awning, commonly used for outdoor parties, weddings, feasts etc. Its side walls are removable. The external fabric can be plain, multicolored or patterned. The four corners are supported by wooden poles. The history of the shamiana dates back to the Mughal era.

As per Government of India service tax rules under the Finance Act 1997, the definition of a shamiana is given under clause 77A of section 65: "pandaal or shamiana means a place specially prepared or arranged for organizing an official, social or business function".

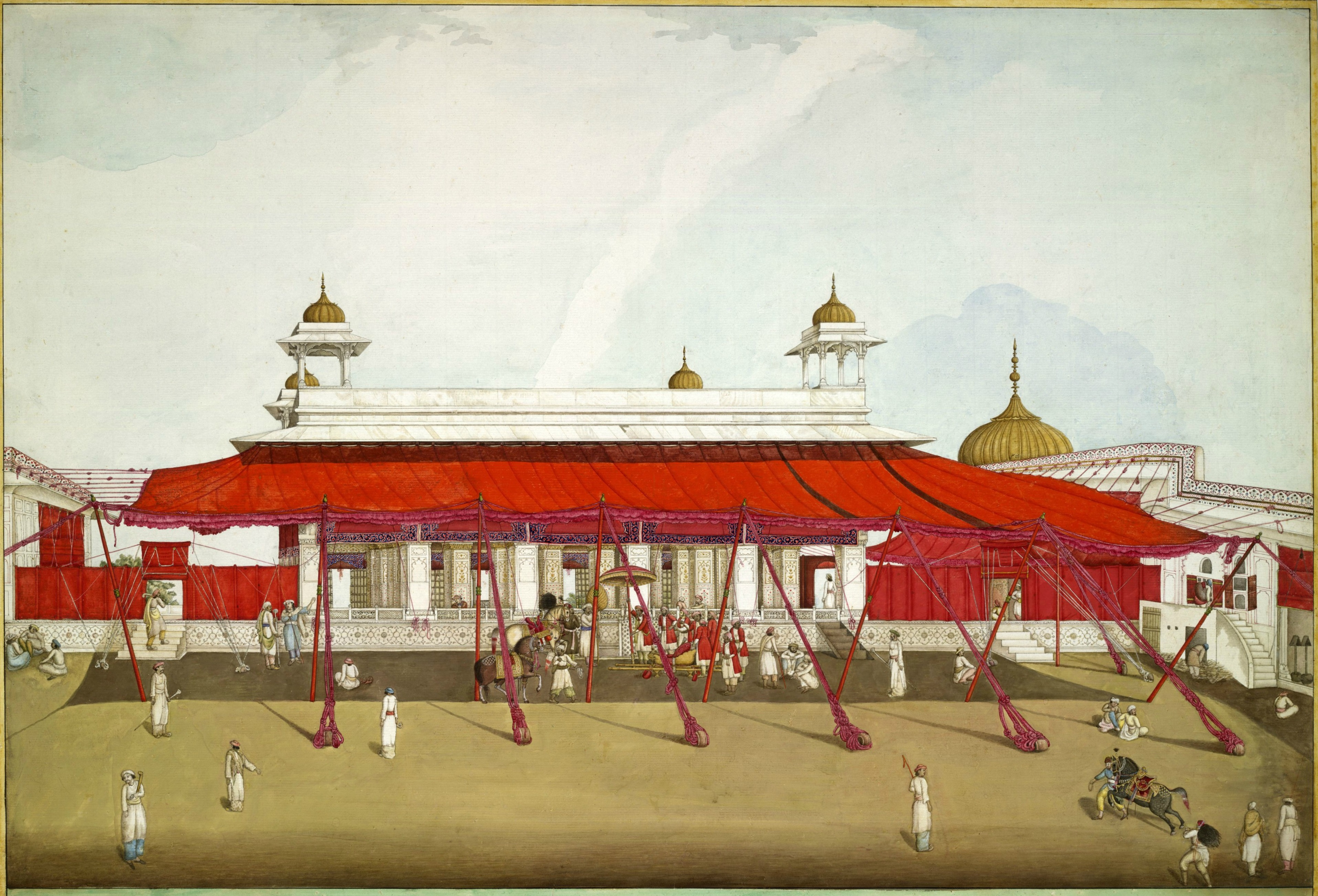
Red shamiana awnings on the Diwan-i-Khas, Red Fort, Delhi, in 1817

== See also ==
- Pandal, Indian and Hindu counterpart
