= Arimalam =

- Town panchayat
- Location in Tamil Nadu, India
- Coordinates: 10.257434°N 78.889371°E
- Country: India
- State: Tamil Nadu
- District: Pudukkottai
- Elevation: 66 m (217 ft)

Population (2001)
  - Total: 7,811

Languages
  - Official: Tamil, English
- Time zone: UTC+5:30 (IST)
- PIN: 622201
- Telephone code: 04333
- Vehicle registration: TN 55
- Website: www.arimalam.in

Arimalam is a town panchayat in the district of Pudukkottai, in the state of Tamil Nadu, India.

== Geography ==
Arimalam is located at 10.257434°N 78.889371°E. It has an average elevation of 66 metres (216 feet). It is 22 kilometers away from Pudukkottai.
