= Dravidian movement =

Political movement in British India

The Dravidian movement started in British India with the formation of the Justice Party on 20 November 1916 in Victoria Public Hall in Madras by C. Natesa Mudaliar along with T. M. Nair and P. Theagaraya Chetty as a result of a series of non-Brahmin conferences and meetings in the presidency.

Communal division between Brahmins and non-Brahmins began in the presidency during the late-19th and early-20th century, mainly due to caste prejudices and disproportionate Brahmins representation in government jobs. The Justice Party's foundation marked the culmination of several efforts to establish an organisation to represent the non-Brahmins in Madras Presidency.

== Background ==
=== Brahmin/non-Brahmin divide ===
The Brahmins in Madras Presidency held a higher position in social hierarchy. By 1912, Telugu Brahmins and Tamil Brahmins, who made up only 3.2% of the population, had increased their political power by filling most of the jobs then open to Indian men. They dominated the administrative services and the newly created urban professions in the 19th and early 20th centuries. Their higher literacy and English-language proficiency were instrumental in this ascendancy. The political, social, and economical divide between Brahmins and non-Brahmins became more apparent in the beginning of the 20th century, and Annie Besant's Home Rule for India movement further exacerbated it. The following table shows the distribution of selected jobs among caste groups in Madras Presidency in 1912.

Caste group	Deputy collectors	Sub judges	District Munsifs	% of total male population
Brahmins	77	15	93	3.2
non-Brahmin Hindus	30	3	25	85.6
Muslims	15	nil	2	6.6
Indian Christians	7	nil	5	2.7
Europeans and Eurasians	11	nil	3	.1

During 1910–20, eight out of the nine official members (appointed by the Governor of Madras) were Brahmins. Apart from the appointed members, Brahmins also formed the majority of the members elected to the council from the district boards and municipalities. During this period the Madras Province Congress Committee (regional branch of the Indian National Congress) was also dominated by Brahmins. Of the 11 major newspapers and magazines in the presidency, two (The Madras Mail and Madras Times) were run by Europeans sympathetic to the crown, three were evangelical non–political periodicals, four (The Hindu, Indian Review, Swadesamithran and Andhra Pathrika) were published by Brahmins while New India, run by Annie Besant was sympathetic to the Brahmins. This dominance was denounced by the non-Brahmin leaders in the form of pamphlets and open letters written to the Madras Governor. The earliest examples of such pamphlets are the ones authored by the pseudonymous author calling himself "fair play" in 1895. By the second decade of the 20th century, the Brahmins of the presidency were themselves divided into three factions. These were the Mylapore faction comprising Chetpet Iyers and Vembakkam Iyengars, the Egmore faction led by the editor of The Hindu, Kasturi Ranga Iyengar and the Salem nationalists led by C. Rajagopalachari. A fourth non-Brahmin faction rose to compete with them and became the Justice party.

== Telugu power struggle angle ==
Formation of the Dravidian movement took place against discussions on the issues of caste representation, politics, and language in the Madras Presidency. Struggles for political domination between the Brahmin and non-Brahmin factions were just one such example.

The Vijayanagara Empire used Telugu Balija generals and Telugu Niyogi Brahmins to control Tamil regions. Native Tamil Brahmins and Vellalars were also used .

The Madurai Balija Nayak administrators of Tanjore broke free from the empire and independently ruled Tamil regions for over 200 years in the 16th and 17th centuries. They were then defeated by the Marathas. Nayak descendants were the last dynasty to rule the Sri Lankan kingdom of Kandy (Nayaks of Kandy).

The Telugu Nayaks would appoint Telugu families as rulers and zamindars. This made these families very rich and powerful. One example is the PSG Group of Coimbatore.

These Telugu zamindars enjoyed power in the British period too. Out of 10 Chief Ministers of the Madras Presidency, 6 were from Telugu non-Brahmin families and 2 were from Telugu Brahmin families.

The infamous Keezhvenmani massacre's chief perpeterator was Gopalakrishnan Naidu, a Telugu zamindar.

E V Ramaswamy Naicker of the Dravidian movement himself was a Kannada Balija from a rich zamindar family.

M. Karunanidhi was also of Telugu ancestry.

Vijayakanth, the famous Tamil actor and politician, too was a Telugu Balija.

Telugu Brahmins too wielded much influence.

Gopanna, the Vijayanagara general who defeated the Madurai Sultanate, was a Niyogi Brahmin.

Keshav Baliram Hegdewar was a Telugu Brahmin. Sarvepalli Radhakrishnan and P. V. Narasimha Rao too were Niyogi Brahmins.

Subramaniam Swamy has Telugu origins.

Even the powerful Namboodiris of Kerala are said to have split off from the Telugu Brahmins.

=== History and Caste Reconfiguration within the Dravidian Movement ===
The Dravidian movement, originating in the early 20th century, emerged as a rationalist, anti-caste, and anti-Brahmin socio-political initiative. Influenced by figures such as Iyothee Thass, E. V. Ramasamy (Periyar), and Singaravelu Chettiar, the movement critiqued the Vedic-Brahminical order as a form of religious and cultural domination over the indigenous Dravidian population. Its early support base included marginalized castes—particularly Scheduled Castes and Backward Classes—seeking educational access, social equality, and temple rights.

The formation of the Justice Party in 1916 marked the political foundation of the movement, followed by the launch of the Self-Respect Movement in 1925 and later the Dravidar Kazhagam (DK). These organizations promoted atheism, Tamil linguistic pride, and the abolition of caste and religion.

By the mid-20th century, however, as the movement transitioned into electoral politics via the Dravida Munnetra Kazhagam (DMK) and its offshoots, dominant non-Brahmin landlord castes such as the Balija Naidu, Reddy, Nair, Mudaliyar, Vellalar, communities increasingly came to control its leadership and material networks. While these castes had historically positioned themselves against Brahminical dominance, they retained significant socio-economic privilege and often reproduced caste hierarchies in their own image.

This led to a transformation in the movement’s social justice framework. Scholars describe it as a shift toward graded inequality—where anti-Brahmin rhetoric was retained but hierarchical privilege was preserved by newly dominant castes. As electoral pragmatism took priority, radical anti-caste ideals were moderated in favor of caste-based patronage politics. Dalit and most MBC communities remained underrepresented in leadership and state power structures.

Transition of Power within the Dravidian Movement
Period	Dominant Ideology	Key Leaders	Dominant Castes in Control	Political Outcome
1916–1944	Anti-Brahminism, Rationalism, Anti-Hinduism	Periyar, Iyothee Thass	Broad non-Brahmin base including Dalits	Justice Party, DK formation
1944–1967	Anti-casteism, Tamil nationalism, Atheism	Periyar, C. N. Annadurai	Vellalars, Mudaliars, Naidus rise	Birth of DMK; electoral transition
1967–present	Welfare populism, Soft Dravidianism	M. Karunanidhi, M. G. Ramachandran, M. K. Stalin	Dominant intermediary castes retain power	Consolidation of DMK/AIADMK rule

Though the Dravidian movement began as a radical project for caste annihilation, its institutionalization led to the entrenchment of new elites. Critics argue that the movement, while discursively anti-Brahmin, ultimately enabled the rise of a new caste elite under the guise of Dravidian secularism and social justice.
