= Self-Respect Movement =

Social movement for lower-caste equity

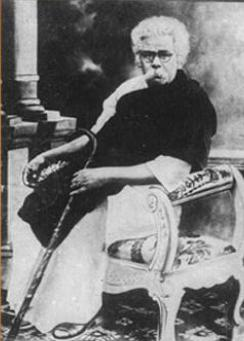
Periyar, a head of the Movement in Tamil Nadu

The Self-Respect Movement is a popular human rights movement originating in South India aimed at achieving social equality for those oppressed by the Indian caste system, advocating for lower castes to develop self-respect. It was founded in 1925 by S. Ramanathan, who invited E. V. Ramasamy (also known as Periyar) to head the India against Brahminism movement in Tamil Nadu. The movement was extremely influential not only in Tamil Nadu, but also overseas in countries with large Tamil populations, such as Sri Lanka, Burma, and Singapore. Among Singapore Indians, groups like the Tamil Reform Association, and leaders such as Thamizhavel G. Sarangapani were prominent in promoting the principles of the Self-Respect Movement among the local Tamil population through schools and publications.

A number of political parties in Tamil Nadu, such as Dravida Munnetra Kazhagam (DMK) and All India Anna Dravida Munnetra Kazhagam (AIADMK) owe their origins to the Self-Respect Movement; the latter had a breakaway from the DMK in 1972. Both parties are populist with a generally social democratic orientation.

== Principles of Self-Respect ==
Ramasamy was convinced that if man developed self respect, he would automatically develop individuality and would refuse to be led by the nose by schemers. One of his most known quotes on Self-Respect was, "we are fit to think of 'self-respect' only when the notion of 'superior' and 'inferior' caste is banished from our land".

Ramasamy did not expect personal or material gain out of this movement. He used to recall in a very casual manner that as a human being, he also was obligated to this duty, as it was the right and freedom to choose this work. Thus, he opted to engage himself in starting and promoting the movement.

Periyar declared that the Self-Respect Movement alone could be the genuine freedom movement, and political freedom would not be fruitful without individual self-respect. He remarked that the so-called 'Indian freedom fighters' were showing disrespect of self-respect, and this was really an irrational philosophy.

He observed that political freedom as conceived by nationalists such as Gandhi and Jawaharlal Nehru and others did not cover individual self-respect. To him, neither revival of the original spirit of Hindu religion and ancient traditions which formed part of Gandhi's conception of freedom, nor complete liberation from the British rule which was considered by Nehru to be the meaning of freedom, nor both of them together, could ensure individual self-respect or the eradication of social ills from Indian society. In his opinion, the task of fulfilling the need for self-respect would have to be faced whatever be the extent of political freedom gained. Pointing out that even the British monarch in a sovereign independent nation had no freedom to marry a person of his choice and had to abdicate his kingdom, Ramasamy raised a question whether Gandhi's vision of freedom or Nehru's concept of independence contained even an iota of individual self-respect.

Ramasamy believed that self-respect was as valuable as life itself and its protection is a birthright and not swaraj ('political freedom'). He described the movement as Arivu Vidutalai Iyakkam, that is, a movement to liberate the intellect.

The terms tan-maanam or suya mariyadai meaning 'self-respect' are traceable in ancient Tamil literature considered a virtue of high valor in Tamil society. Ramasamy once claimed that to describe the ideology of his movement, no dictionary or language in the entire world could provide a word better than or equal to suya mariyadai.

Started as a movement (iyakkam in Tamil; Dravida Iyakkam) to promote rational behavior, the Self-Respect Movement acquired much wider connotation within a short period of time. Periyar, speaking with M.K. Reddy at the First Self-Respect Conference held in 1929, explained the significance of self-respect and its principles. The main principles of the Self-Respect Movement in society were to be: no kind of inequality among people; no difference such as rich and poor in economic life; men and women to be treated as equals in every respect without differences; attachments to caste, religion, varna, and country to be eradicated from society with a prevalent friendship and unity around the world; with every human being seeking to act according to reason, understanding, desire, and perspective, and shall not be subject to slavery of any kind or manner.

Equality with stress on economic and social equality formed the central theme of the Self-Respect Movement and was due to Ramasamy's determination to fight the inequalities ingrained in the caste system as well as certain religious practices. Working on the theme of liberating the society from the baneful social practices perpetrated in the name of dharma and karma, Ramasamy developed the idea of establishing this movement as the instrument for achieving his objective.

== Anti-Brahminism ==
Ramasamy was an advocate of anti-Brahminism. Ramasamy's ideology of anti-Brahminism was radical to such an extent that a non-Brahmin who upheld the integrity of the caste system was seen as a supporter of Brahminism. Ramasamy called on both Brahmins and non-Brahmins to cast out brahmanism.

Ramasamy also claimed, on several occasions, that to eliminate the caste system, driving away the Brahmins was crucial. In 1957, he called for the killing of Brahmins and burning of their houses on more than one occasion; prompting the then Prime Minister of India, Jawaharlal Nehru to write to K. Kamaraj who was the Chief Minister of Madras State (Tamil Nadu) at that time, urging him to deal with this matter without delay. The Dravidian nationalist's call to "kill Tamil Brahmins" at a 1973 speech in Karaikudi is still echoed in the 21st century by regional parties. He would make a number of genocidal statements such as, "If you see a snake and a Brahmin, hit the Brahmin first". The reasoning for those statements is given as such.

In 1920, when the Justice Party came to power, Brahmins occupied about 70 percent of the high level posts in the government. After reservation was introduced by the Justice Party, it changed this trend, allowing non-Brahmins to rise in the government of the Madras Presidency. Ramasamy spoke against the unbalance of the domination of Brahmins who were only 3 percent of the population, over government jobs, judiciary and the Madras University. He continued this line of thought despite the fact that by the 1930s, the majority of students in both arts and professional colleges were not Brahmins. On the employment front, the total number of Brahmin gazetted officers were 620 in 1928. Overall, there were about 15,000 Brahmins out of about 80,000 government employees.

Ramasamy, in regard to a DK member's attempt to assassinate Rajagopalachari, "expressed his abhorrence of violence as a means of settling political differences". But many suggest that the values of the non-Brahmin movement were explicitly anti-Brahmin.

== Anti-Hinduism ==
In addition to his hatred against his perceived oppressors in the minority, Ramasamy was also anti-Hindu. In 1953, Periyar organised agitations for the desecration of Ganesha idols. He stated in a speech in 1953, “We have to eradicate the gods who are responsible for the institution which portrays us as sudras, people of low birth, and some others as brahmins of high birth… We have to break the idols of these gods. I start with Ganesha because it is he who is worshipped before undertaking any task.” Paula Richman details the events leading up to his activities: “On the first day of August in 1956, E. V. Ramasami (henceforth E.V.R.) set out for the Madras Marina to lead his followers in burning pictures of Lord Rama, hero of the Ramayana. This symbolic action would represent a reversal of the culmination of north Indian performances of the Ramayana, in which images of the epic’s villain, Ravana, are put to the flames as spectators watch in delight.” The account goes on to detail how political leaders implored Periyar to cancel the event so as not to offend orthodox Hindu Tamils, but Periyar remained unmoved, noting that “there was bound to be a difference of views regarding any measure aimed at bringing social reform”. The act of burning Rama pictures by Ramasamy was to celebrate Ravana Leela to counter the Ram Leela in Delhi during the Dussehra festival, his argument being that Ramayana sought to perpetuate the Aryan domination over the Dravidian ‘sudran’, Ravana of Tamil origin.

== Self-Respect marriages ==
One of the major sociological changes introduced through the self-respect movement was the self-respect marriage system, whereby marriages were conducted without being officiated by a Brahmin priest. Periyar had regarded the then conventional marriages as mere financial arrangements and often caused great debt through dowry. The Self-Respect movement encouraged inter-caste marriages, replacing arranged marriages by love marriages that are not constrained by caste.

It was argued by the proponents of self-respect marriage that the then conventional marriages were officiated by Brahmins, who had to be paid for and also the marriage ceremony was in Sanskrit which most people did not understand, and hence were rituals and practices based on blind adherence.

Self-respect movement promoters argue that there was no reference to Thaali in the Sangam literatures like Tirukkuṛaḷ or Akanaṉūṟu, which describe the Tamils' lifestyle during the Sangam era. The Hindu marriage ceremonies involving Brahmins are argued to be practices introduced relatively recently to increase the influence of Brahminism on Tamils' lives.

Even though self-respect marriages have been practiced since 1928, initially these marriages just lacked a priest while the Hindu marriage events and ceremonies were followed. The first self-respect marriage that was totally devoid of any Hindu ceremony was the marriage of the prominent self-respect movement writer Kuthoosi Gurusamy with another prominent leader, Kunjidham, under the presiding of Periyaar on 8 December 1929. The self-respect movement encouraged widow remarriage as well. Due to the prevalent practice of child marriage and very poor health facilities, there were a high number of widows in then society. Women like Sivagami Ammaiyar, who could be widowed at 11 years, were given a new lease on life by the widow remarriage principles of the self-respect movement. Consequently, the self-respect movement attracted a lot of women.

Tamil Nadu became the first state (followed by U.T. of Puducherry in 1971) to legalize Hindu marriages conducted without a Brahmin priest. This was the first file signed by CM Annadurai when the DMK gained power in the 1967 Madras assembly elections. Annadurai sent the rule draft to Periyar and at his suggestion changed "and" to "or" in the law text which made the thaali/mangalsutra optional in marriages. This was implemented as Hindu Marriage Act (Madras Amendment) Act, 1967, introducing Section 7A, permitting Suyamariyathai (self-respect) and Seerthiruttha (reformist) marriages as legal when solemnised in the presence of friends, relatives or any other person by exchanging garlands or rings or by tying of a mangalsutra or by a declaration in language understood by both parties that they accept each other to be their spouse. The law was passed by the Tamil Nadu assembly on 27 November 1967, and was approved by the President on 17 January 1968. This was officially announced in the gazette on 20 January 1968. The number of inter-caste and inter-religious marriages has increased in the state as a result of the self-respect movement.

== Women of the Self-Respect Movement ==
In addition to many of the anti-Caste and Tamil nationalist ideologies of the Self-Respect Movement, it is also widely regarded that the Self-Respect Movement, held as core, deeply feminist values. Gender relationships were actively divorced from Brahminical patriarchy and women's rights over their physical, sexual and reproductive choices were celebrated. In Periyar's model of society, women were to be allowed access to contraception and even permanent birth control measures. This came at a time when the broad national discourse on birth control through influenced by the thoughts of leaders like Gandhi, was an almost unanimous condemnation of birth control. Women were given the right to choose partners as well as divorce them and remarry. Widowhood was not penalized through religious beliefs. Heterosexual partnerships were radically transformed by advocating for the erasure of gender hierarchies and roles; the sharing of domestic work, child-rearing were all paths to love through equality and service to society.

These ideas attracted several women from all walks of life to the movement. Women included former prostitutes, former devadasis, wage labourers, doctors and teachers. Women in the movement worked on issues most closely affecting women like advocating for alcohol prohibition, supporting survivors of domestic violence and the anti-temple prostitution (devadasi system). However, these were not the issues they were restricted to. For example, the anti-Hindi agitations of 1930s were heavily represented by women of the movement. On 11 September 1938 in Madras, several women including Ramamritham Ammaiyar, Narayani Ammaiyar, Va. Ba. Thamaraikanni Ammaiyar, Munnagaara Azhagiyar and a total of 73 women were arrested for protesting. 37 of these women went to jail with their infants.

Two Dalit women, Veerammal and Annai Meenambal Shivraj were key to the sustenance of the movement and close advisors and friends of Periyar. Annai Meenambal was the person who first gave E.V. Ramasamy, the title "Periyar" meaning the elder or wise one and Veerammal is said to have provoked Periyar to think more critically about how the movement could do better not just for non-Brahmin castes, but also for Dalits and Adivasis.

== See also ==
- Anti-Brahminism
- Anti-Hindi agitations
- History of the Indian caste system
- Namantar Andolan
