= Tamil cinema and Dravidian politics =

Tamil cinema has played a vital role in Dravidian politics in the South Indian state of Tamil Nadu. Films have been influential in Indian politics since the days of the British Raj, when movies were used for anti-British propaganda. Nevertheless, the leaders of the Indian National Congress viewed movie media with contempt. It was the Dravida Munnetra Kazhagam (DMK), a Dravidian party, that made extensive use of this media for propaganda purposes. Adversaries of Dravidian parties despised the use of films and screen popularity for political gain, and Congress leaders like K. Kamaraj questioned the possibility of movie stars forming governments.

C. N. Annadurai, the first Chief Minister of Tamil Nadu from a Dravidian party, was the forerunner in introducing Dravidian ideologies into movie scripts. Of the movies made by Dravidian politicians Parasakthi (1952) was a turning point, as it was a huge box office hit and made radical comments against the social hierarchy set by the caste system and glorified the Dravidian movement. M. Karunanidhi, former Chief Minister, scripted the screen play for Parasakthi, in which Sivaji Ganesan and S.S.Rajendran, two founding members of the DMK, made their screen debuts.

Movies produced by the DMK Party received severe censorship from the then ruling Congress government. According to Murasoli Maran, a former Union Minister from DMK, the censors would remove parts of the movies, so that the coherence of the screen play was lost, making the movies a box office failure. The script writers used equivocating phrases and words to evade the censorship.

Five out of seven chief ministers from Dravidian parties were actively involved in Tamil cinema either as writers or as actors. M. G. Ramachandran, J. Jayalalithaa was the most successful. He launched his own Dravidian party after personal differences with the leaders of DMK, and rose to power as Chief Minister of Tamil Nadu mostly with the help of his movie fans and low level cadres. The legacy of politics in Tamil filmdom still continues, though less prominently than in the 1950s to 1970s.

== Background ==
=== Dravidian movement ===
The Dravidian movement was founded in 1925 by Periyar E. V. Ramasamy (popularly known as Periyar). The movement aimed to achieve a society where backward castes have equal human rights, and encouraging them to have self-respect in the context of a caste-based society that considered them to be at the lower end of the social hierarchy. In Tamil Nadu an array of regional parties, termed Dravidian parties, owe their origin either directly or indirectly to the Dravidian movement. Dravida Munnetra Kazhagam (DMK) and its political rival All India Anna Dravida Munnetra Kazhagam (AIADMK) have been the major Dravidian parties. One of the major platforms of the Dravidian movement was to achieve political change by means of awareness within the society in everyday life. Thus Dravidian politicians viewed film media as an apt vehicle to promote such a revolution.

=== Tamil cinema ===
Tamil cinema, like its counterparts in other languages in India, is known as a melodramatic entertainment form plotted around twists of fate set in exaggerated locales, and filled with songs and dances.

Although a few stars from other southern states have tried to use film popularity as a stepping stone in politics, such as N. T. Rama Rao (Andhra Pradesh), Rajkumar (Karnataka) and Prem Nazir (Kerala), it was in Tamil Nadu that it was most prominent, with five of the seven Chief Ministers from Dravidian parties hailing from the Tamil film industry. In a state such as Tamil Nadu, where no single caste is predominant, film stars were considered people with wide acceptability to lead. According to emeritus professor K. Sivathamby, the movie halls themselves acted as a symbol of social equality. He states

The Cinema Hall was the first performance centre in which all Tamils sat under the same roof. The basis of the seating is not on the hierarchic position of the patron but essentially on his purchasing power. If he cannot afford paying the higher rate, he has either to keep away from the performance or be with 'all and sundry'.

== Politicizing Tamil cinema ==
"They (Congress party) decried the cinema. We (DMK) used it." — Kannadasan, a Tamil film song writer

—

Early Tamil films were mainly based on mythological stories, and movies based on contemporary society started only in 1936. With the end of the era of silent movies in the 1930s many stage actors joined the Tamil cinema, and brought the ideologies of Gandhian philosophies with them.

Although the Congress party made use of movie stars such as K. B. Sundarambal to appear at political meetings, some congressmen of that era looked upon movie media with contempt. Tamil Congress leaders like C. Rajagopalachari considered movie media to be a source of moral corruption. K. Kamaraj, then president of the All India Congress, mocked DMK's desire to get into power in this statement:

How can there be government by actors?

== DMK and cinema ==
"The DMK films served an audience the party could never have reached by other means." — Professor Robert Hardgrave

—

Attempts made by some Congress leaders to use stars of Tamil cinema, however minimal, were limited since this media remained inaccessible to the rural population (who were in the majority). The politicising of movies by the Congress virtually stopped soon after Indian Independence in 1947. With the introduction of electricity to rural areas in the 1950s Dravidian politicians could implement movies as a major political organ.

In post colonial India, Dravida Munnetra Kazhagam (DMK) was the first – at the time the only – party to take advantage of visual movie media. Actors and writers of guerrilla theatre, who were inspired by the ideologies of Periyar, brought the philosophies of Tamil nationalism and anti-Brahminism to celluloid media. The movies not only made direct references to the independent Dravida Nadu that its leaders preached for but also at many times displayed party symbols within the movie. Murasoli Maran, former central minister from DMK, considered that the DMK movies reflected the faces of both the past (demonstrating the rich language and culture of Tamils) and the future (with social justice). The DMK films espoused Dravidian ideologies through use of lengthy dialogues in its initial movies. Nevertheless, as the party's political aspirations grew, the movies based on Dravidian social reformation themes were replaced with stories that would enhance star popularity.

== Censorship in DMK movies ==
The initial DMK movies were not victims of censorship since the party was little known to the censors, but as the party gained popularity in mid-1950s censorship became stronger. According to Murasoli Maran one of the techniques followed by the censors was to make sure that the coherence of the movie was lost so that it was a box office failure. At one point DMK, having had been a target of high censorship, had to move back to stage dramas. But the Dramatic Licensing Act brought censorship to stage plays as well, and two of Karunanidhi's plays were banned.

To evade censorship DMK scriptwriters chose to use puns and equivocal phrases. The most commonly used pun was Anna which is the word for older brother in Tamil and also was the popular name for DMK chief C. N. Annadurai. When Anna was praised on screen the audience would break into applause.

== Script writers of DMK ==
=== C. N. Annadurai ===
"With a view to educating the people of Tamilnad. All my stories and screenplays have, therefore, been on themes of social purpose" – Annadurai, on his screen scripts

—

The use of movie media as a major propaganda vehicle of Dravidian ideologies was first introduced by Annadurai, the founder chief of DMK, through his scripts. During his initial days with Dravidar Kazhagam, Annadurai wrote dramas which promoted social reforms and non-Brahmin self-respect ideologies. After the formation of DMK, Annadurai, along with E. V. K. Sampath (Periyar's nephew and one of the founders of DMK) and actor K. R. Ramasamy, staged several plays promoting Dravidian ideologies. The DMK party's head office was purchased using the money raised through these plays. Annadurai scripted six screen plays in total.

His first movie was Nallathambi (Good Brother, 1948), which starred N. S. Krishnan. It promoted cooperative farming and the abolition of the zamindari system of taxation. His movies such as Velaikaari (Servant Maid, 1949) and Or Iravu carried the hallmarks of propaganda for Dravidian politics. On Velaikari, Annadurai said that the movie

made it clear that greed and avarice of the rich did not pay in the long run.[...] Some of the elementary principles of socialism and stressed that we should depend upon our own labor for our progress and well being and not some unknown factor.

Velaikari made direct criticisms of suppressive landlords who were traditionally allied with Jawaharlal Nehru and Gandhi. When DMK won the elections in 1967, Annadurai served as its first Chief Minister until his death in 1969.

=== Karunanidhi ===
"intention was to introduce the ideas and policies of social reform and justice […] and bring up the status of the Tamil language as they were called for in DMK politics" — Karunanidhi, on Parasakthi

—

Karunanidhi, the other major leader from DMK, started his propaganda efforts with Parasakthi (1952). Parasakthi was a turning point in Tamil cinema, as until then most movies contained up to 55 songs and were mostly based on mythologies. Parasakthi was initially banned. When it was finally released in 1952 it emerged as a huge box office hit.

To create havoc. Of course it did. We were challenging the social law itself, the basic Constitution itself.

— S. Punju, the director of Parasakthi, on the movie.,

Like that of his political mentor Annadurai, Karunanidhi's movies carried elements of Dravidian political ideologies such as anti-Brahminism and anti Congress Party messages. Two of the movies that contained such messages were Panam and Thangarathinam. The overall themes of the movies were remarriage of widows, untouchability, self-respect marriages, abolition of zamindari and abolition of religious hypocrisy.

Until 1949-50 Tamil film dialogues were in a Brahminical slang of the Tamil language. Annadurai and Karunanidhi introduced Tamil close to formal language and void of Sanskrit influence. According to Professor Robert Hardgrave Jr, the popularity of their movie dialogues made both Annadurai and Karunanidhi "stars in their own right." After the death of Annadurai, Karunanidhi assumed the office of the Chief Minister in Tamil Nadu, and with intermediate periods of in and out of power, he served his 5th term as the chief minister from 2006 to 2011.

== Actors from Dravidian parties ==
=== K. R. Ramasamy ===
K. R. Ramasamy was an actor of both stage and screen in the 1940s and 50s. He was one of the founding leaders of the DMK and it was his earnings that initially financed the party. A talented singer and actor, he was called a Nadipisai Pulavar (acting and singing poet) by the popular masses. Improvements in technology in the film industry, including playback singing, along with personal problems ended the career of Ramaswamy. Nevertheless, he was nominated as a member of the Legislative Council (upper house of the State) by Annadurai in recognition of his service to the party.

=== N. S. Krishnan ===
N. S. Krishnan, or NSK as he was popularly known, was a Tamil comic actor and, as the times then required, a talented singer. He was never officially a member of any Dravidian party, but served the DMK to a great extent. He was one of the few non-Brahmins of his era to be popular in a Brahmin-dominated Tamil film industry. His favourite character to play in the movies was a Brahmin buffoon, which he would also enact in DMK meetings. NSK was highly influenced by the ideologies of Periyar and sowed the seeds of anti-Brahmanism in his scripts. NSK served the cause of DMK so much that the last public gathering Annadurai ever attended was to unveil a statue of NSK at a busy intersession in Chennai.

=== M. R. Radha ===
M. R. Radha was a stage actor and was popular through his roles as villain on screen. He was an ardent follower of Periyar and was close to most DMK leaders before they split from Dravidiar Kazhagam. Both Annadurai and Karunanidhi were part of M. R. Radha's troupe at different times and had even acted in his plays.

=== Sivaji Ganesan ===
Sivaji Ganesan is a veteran actor of Tamil cinema. He started his acting career at the age of six and toured with various drama troupes including that of M. R. Radha. The actor himself was named Shivaji by Periyar E. V. Ramasami after his role portraying the Maratiya king in a play named Chandra Mohan. In Chandra Mohan the Maratiya king triumphs over Brahmins and the role of the villainous Brahmin was played by Annadurai himself.

Sivaji Ganesan made his movie debut in 1952 with Parasakthi, which opens with a song that glorifies Dravidian culture. Sivaji was a Tamil, whereas at the time he entered the film industry most other major actors were Telugus. He later became one of the founding members of DMK. Although it was DMK movies that brought Sivaji to the limelight he found that the responsibilities that the party threw at him limited his acting career. His association with DK and with DMK gave him an atheistic reputation that acted as a barrier between him and the religious segment of the audience. Realising that DMK was no longer an asset to his career, he attacked it as a glamour party and broke party protocol by his pilgrimage to Tirumala Venkateswara Temple. With the growing popularity of MGR in the party, Sivaji left DMK and aligned with the Tamil Nationalist Party of E. V. K. Sampath. When the Tamil Nationalist Party was dissolved he joined the Congress Party. Although Congress itself lost in the elections in the 1967, Sivaji's fans kept the party alive. In spite of being an active member of the Congress party, he made sure his movies were free of political references. After differences with party leaders he launched his own party, Thamizhaga Munnetra Munnani, in 1989 but with little success, even losing his security deposit in the 1991 assembly election.

=== S. S. Rajendran ===
S. S. Rajendran (known popularly as SSR) was initially a theatre artist like Shivaji who starred in many plays for Dravidar Kazhagam. Like Sivaji, he debuted in Parasakthi. Being one of the most popular stars of Tamil cinema in the 1950s and 60s, he raised funds for DMK and acted in movies glorifying Dravidian ideologies.SSR was the first elected member of legislative assembly among actors in India in 1962.Personal problems led to a fall in his film career and in politics. Having spent most of his earnings for the party he found himself in a deep financial crisis. His movie career brought another star of DMK, M. G. Ramachandran, to cross swords with him, and his political ambitions brought Karunanidhi against him. Sensing trouble in all quarters SSR made a highly political movie, Thangarathinam, to coincide with the 1967 election campaign to prove his loyalty to the party. The party won a landslide victory in the 1967 general elections, but soon after the elections the animosity between SSR and Karunanidhi deepened. SSR complained of threats to his life and eventually left DMK to join AIADMK along with his old friend MGR. His aspirations as a political stalwart and as a film superstar were overshadowed by M. G. Ramachandran.

=== M. G. Ramachandran ===
M. G. Ramachandran (popularly known as MGR) was the foremost star for DMK propaganda during its peak and was politically the most successful of any film stars in India. MGR had a simple beginning in stage plays at the age of six. MGR was first invited by Annadurai to star in one of his movies in the 1950s. From then on MGR actively participated in the party's meetings. His films such as Nadodi Mannan (Vagabond King, 1958), Enga Vitu Pillai (Son of our House, 1965), Nam Nadu (Our Nation, 1969), Adimai Penn (Slave Girl, 1969) and Engal Thangam (Our Gold or Our Precious, 1970) displayed a stereotypical image of a philanthropic, mundane hero made out of a vagrant who becomes a king.

Unlike other DMK actors, MGR used his screen popularity in social works as well, which included financing the poor, running orphanages and participating in disaster relief. MGR's movies portrayed him as a friend of the poor and downtrodden. MGR himself commented

My roles have been to show how a man should live and believe.

MGR always acted as a hero and made sure that he was always portrayed in a good light on screen. With the departure of Sivaji Ganesan from DMK, MGR's position within the party grew stronger. In contrast to Parasakthi, MGR's movies made less reference to social justice but dwelled more on contemporary political scenarios. The movies typically included references to Dravida and MGR would be clad in red and black (the DMK flag colours). In sharp contrast with earlier DMK movies where the overall theme was used for propaganda, in MGR's movies the protagonist was shown as a representative of the party ideology, who would fight against evil and support the poor. Thus he played roles that were directly relevant to the filmgoers and displayed himself as a symbol of the fulfilment of their own dreams. MGR, however, made sure that his social image, which he gained by independent charity and social works, did not get merged with that of DMK.

With his rising popularity with the common man MGR fell into controversy by referring to K. Kamaraj, the Congress leader, as My leader. MGR resigned as a Member of Legislative Council. Soon after, the attendance of his then newly released movie dropped, with DMK supporters boycotting the movie.

"When we show his (MGR's) face, we (DMK) get 40,000 votes; when he speaks a few words, we get 4 lakhs" — Annadurai, on M. G. Ramachandran

—

Just before the 1967 general elections MGR was shot by M. R. Radha in a personal dispute. This incident gained support of sympathising voters for DMK in the days leading up to the elections. Professor Hardgrave claims that at the time of the shooting incident MGR's popularity was slowly declining and the incident helped him regain his stature with the masses as well as the party. Whether DMK gained with MGR's popularity or MGR gained popularity with the rise of DMK remains a question for debate.

Although MGR's charisma probably played a significant role in DMK's success, his popularity also cost the party much. When the party leaders tried to neutralise his powers, MGR launched his own party in 1972, the All India Anna Dravida Munnetra Kazhagam, with support of the lower cadres alone. According to Professor Hardgrave one of the reasons for antipathy between MGR and the DMK leadership was Karunanidhi's attempt to bring his son M. K. Muthu into the party to replace MGR and to convert MGR fan clubs into Muthu fan clubs. The fictionalised account of the troubled relationship between Karunanidhi and MGR was later portrayed in the Tamil film Iruvar (The Duo) in 1997.

When MGR formed his own party, Karunanidhi underestimated MGR's popularity and commented on AIADMK as "a successful movie's 100-day run". However, with the support from his fans and low cadres alone, MGR won the 1977 state elections with a landslide victory and continued to rule the state until his death in December 1987.

=== J. Jayalalithaa ===
Jayalalithaa was one of the main leading ladies to pair with MGR on screen. She was inducted into AIADMK by MGR himself and frequently accompanied him to party rallies until MGR left for the United States for medical treatment in 1984. After his return, MGR was always accompanied by V. N. Janaki Ramachandran, his wife of forty years, until his death in 1987.

Soon after MGR's death, AIADMK was split between Jayalalithaa and Janaki Ramachandran . Although both factions had lost the elections, Jayalalithaa's AIADMK won 27 seats when compared to just two won by Janaki's party. Following the election defeat, Janaki retired from active politics and the two party factions rejoined. Although a successful film star of yesteryear, according to Professor Sara Dickey, Jayalalithaa's popularity in politics comes from MGR rather than her own success on screen. She served six terms as the Chief Minister of Tamil Nadu.

== Later years ==
In post MGR years, political reference in Tamil cinema had been less sporadic. Rajinikanth, one of the highest paid actors in India, supported the DMK and its ally Tamil Maanila Congress in the 1996 elections. His movie Muthu (1995) makes an indirect reference to the then AIADMK head and Chief Minister of Tamil Nadu, Jayalalithaa. His movies such as Mannan and Padayappa had characters which were politically identified with Jayalalithaa. He later moved his allegiance to the Bharathiya Janata Party (BJP) in the Indian general election of 2004. He briefly made an entry into politics in 2020 with the intention of contesting the 2021 TN assembly election, eventually withdrawing due to his poor health. Rajinikanth is no longer active in politics, but is known to be sympathetic to the BJP and its ideology. Another leading actor in Tamil cinema, Kamal Hasan, is a well known follower of Periyar. He started his own political party called Makkal Needhi Maiam in 2018. Yet another leading Tamil film actor Vijay campaigned for the AIADMK in the 2011 TN assembly election and speculations have been rife over his potential future entry into politics, with his fan club contesting the Rural Local Body elections in Tamil Nadu in 2021. Later in 2024, Vijay officially announced his political entry and formation of his own political party known as Tamilaga Vetri Kazhagam.

Two contemporary celebrities have launched their own parties. Of them, T. Rajendar was a well known supporter of DMK for a long time, although he did not incorporate its ideas into films. After a personal feud with the DMK leadership he launched his own party All India Latchiya Dravida Munnetra Kazhagam in 2004. Vijayakanth, a mainstream lead actor who was active in films between the 1980s and 2000s, had earlier converted his fan clubs into social service organisations, initially in a "typical, Dravidian, for-the-Tamils" fashion. His party, Desiya Murpokku Dravida Kazhagam is now placing itself as an alternative to mainstream Dravidian parties. In 2011, his party became the official opposition in the Tamil Nadu Legislative Assembly. Vijayakanth himself is from a pro-Congress family.

== See also ==
- Dravidian parties
- Chief ministership of C. Joseph Vijay
