= List of things named after C. N. Annadurai =

Several places are named after Conjeevaram Natarajan Annadurai (15 September 1909 – 3 February 1969), popularly called Anna ("elder brother"), or Perarignar Anna (Anna the scholar). He was a former Chief Minister of the South Indian state of Tamil Nadu. He was the first member of a Dravidian party to hold that post and was also the first non-Congress leader to form a majority government in independent India.

However, he died of cancer just two years into office. Several institutions and organisations are named after him. An Indian regional political party founded by former chief minister of Tamil Nadu M. G. Ramachandran (M.G.R.) at Madurai on 17 October 1972 was named after him as All India Anna Dravida Munnetra Kazhagam

== Chennai ==
- Anna International Terminal - T2
- Arignar Anna Alandur Metro
- Anna Nagar, a neighbourhood in Chennai
- Anna Salai, formerly Mount Road
- Anna Flyover
- Anna University
- Arignar Anna Zoological Park
- Anna Centenary Library
- Anna Square
- Anna Memorial
- Anna Arivalayam, headquarters of the DMK

== Coimbatore ==
- Anna University of Technology, Coimbatore

== Thoothukkudi ==
- Perarignar Anna Bus Terminus
- Anna Nagar
- Arignar Anna Marriage Hall

== Tiruchirappalli ==
- Anna University BIT-Campus
- Anna Nagar
- Anna Stadium

== Tirunelveli ==
- Anna Stadium

== Nagercoil ==
- Anna Town Bus Stand, Nagercoil
- Anna Sports Stadium, Nagercoil

== Pondicherry ==
- Anna Nagar
- Anna Thidal
