= C. N. Annadurai =

Former chief minister of Tamil Nadu (1909–1969)

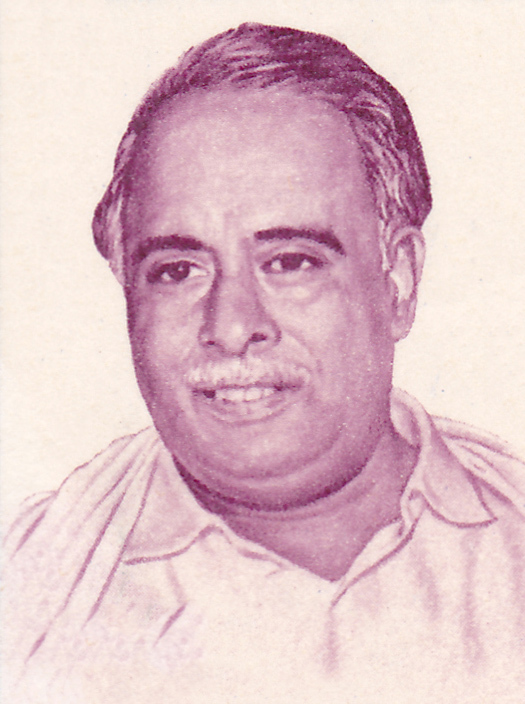

1st Chief Minister of Tamil Nadu
- In office 14 January 1969 – 3 February 1969
- Governor: Ujjal Singh
- Preceded by: Position established Himself (of Madras State)
- Succeeded by: M. Karunanidhi; V. R. Nedunchezhiyan (acting)
- Constituency: Leader of the State Legislative Council

5th Chief Minister of Madras State
- In office 6 March 1967 – 13 January 1969
- Governor: Ujjal Singh
- Preceded by: M. Bhakthavatsalam
- Succeeded by: Position abolished Himself (of Tamil Nadu)
- Constituency: Leader of the State Legislative Council

Member of Parliament, Rajya Sabha
- In office 3 April 1962 – 25 February 1967
- Prime Minister: Jawaharlal Nehru
- Constituency: Madras State

Member of the Madras State Legislative Assembly
- In office 1 April 1957 – 18 March 1962
- Chief Minister: K. Kamaraj
- Preceded by: Deivasigamani
- Succeeded by: S. V. Natesa Mudaliar
- Constituency: Kancheepuram

1st General Secretary of the Dravida Munnetra Kazhagam
- In office 25 September 1960 – 3 February 1969
- President: Vacant
- Preceded by: V. R. Nedunchezhiyan
- Succeeded by: V. R. Nedunchezhiyan
- In office 17 September 1949 – 23 April 1955
- President: Vacant
- Preceded by: Position established
- Succeeded by: V. R. Nedunchezhiyan

Member of the Tamil Nadu Legislative Council
- In office 14 January 1969 – 3 February 1969
- Leader of House: Himself
- Preceded by: Position established
- Succeeded by: Rani Annadurai

Member of the Madras Legislative Council
- In office 6 March 1967 – 14 January 1969

Leader of the Tamil Nadu Legislative Council
- In office 16 January 1969 – 3 February 1969
- Preceded by: Position established
- Succeeded by: M. Karunanidhi

Leader of the Madras Legislative Council
- In office 17 March 1967 – 14 January 1969
- Preceded by: R. Venkatraman
- Succeeded by: Position abolished

Personal details
- Born: Conjeevaram Natarajan Annadurai; 15 September 1909 Conjeevaram, Madras Presidency, British India (present-day Kanchipuram, Tamil Nadu, India)
- Died: 3 February 1969 (aged 59) Madras, Tamil Nadu, India (present-day Chennai)
- Resting place: Anna Memorial
- Party: DMK (1949–1969)
- Other political affiliations: Dravidar Kazhagam (1944–1949); Justice Party (until 1944)
- Spouse: Rani Annadurai (m. 1930)
- Awards: Chubb Fellowship (1968)
- Nicknames: Peraringar; Anna

Conjeevaram Natarajan Annadurai (15 September 1909 – 3 February 1969), also known as Perarignar Anna, was an Indian politician who was the founder and first general-secretary of the Dravida Munnetra Kazhagam (DMK). He served as the fourth and last chief minister of Madras State from 1967 until 1969, and then as the first chief minister of Tamil Nadu for 20 days before his death in office. He was the first member of a Dravidian party to hold either post.

He was well known for his oratorical skills and was an acclaimed writer in the Tamil language. He scripted and acted in several plays. Some of his plays were later made into movies. He was the first politician from the Dravidian parties to use Tamil cinema extensively for political propaganda. Born in a middle-class family, he first worked as a school teacher, then moved into the political scene of the Madras Presidency as a journalist. He edited several political journals and enrolled as a member of the Dravidar Kazhagam. As an ardent follower of Periyar, he rose in stature as a prominent member of the party.

Due to looming differences with Periyar on issues regarding a separate independent state of Dravida Nadu and the union with India, he crossed swords with his political mentor. The friction between the two finally erupted when Periyar married Maniammai, who was much younger than him. Angered by this action of Periyar, Annadurai with his supporters parted from Dravidar Kazhagam and launched his own party, Dravida Munnetra Kazhagam (DMK). The DMK initially followed the same ideologies as its parent, Dravidar Kazhagam. But with the evolution of national politics and the constitution of India after the Sino-Indian War in 1962, Annadurai dropped the claim for an independent Dravida Nadu. Various protests against the ruling Congress government took him to prison on several occasions; the last of which was during the Madras anti-Hindi agitation of 1965. The agitation itself helped Annadurai to gain popular support for his party. His party won a landslide victory in the 1967 state elections. His cabinet was the youngest at that time in India. He legalised Self-Respect marriages, enforced a two-language policy (in preference to the three-language formula in other southern states), implemented subsidies for rice, and renamed Madras State to Tamil Nadu.

However, he died of cancer just two years into office. His funeral had the highest attendance of any to that date. Several institutions and organisations are named after him. A splinter party launched by M. G. Ramachandran in 1972 was named after him as All India Anna Dravida Munnetra Kazhagam.

== Early life ==
Annadurai was born in a Tamil Sengunthar family on 15 September 1909 in Conjeevaram, Madras Presidency, in a lower-middle-class family. His father Natarajan Mudaliar was a weaver and his mother was Bangaru Ammal, a temple servant. He was raised by his sister Rajamani Ammal.

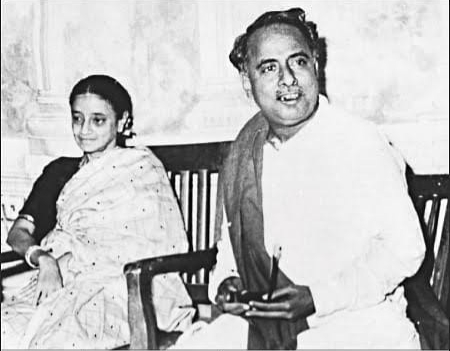
Annadurai with his wife

At the age of 21, he married Rani while he was still a student. The couple had no children of their own, so they later adopted and raised Rajamani's grandchildren. He attended Pachaiyappa's High School, but left school to work as a clerk in the town's Municipal office to assist with the family finances.

In 1934, he graduated with a B.A. degree from Pachaiyappa's College in Madras. He then earned an M.A degree in economics and politics from the same college. He worked as an English teacher in Pachaiyappa High School. Later he left teaching job and began involving himself in journalism and he served as an editor in few weekly magazine and then he indulged into politics.

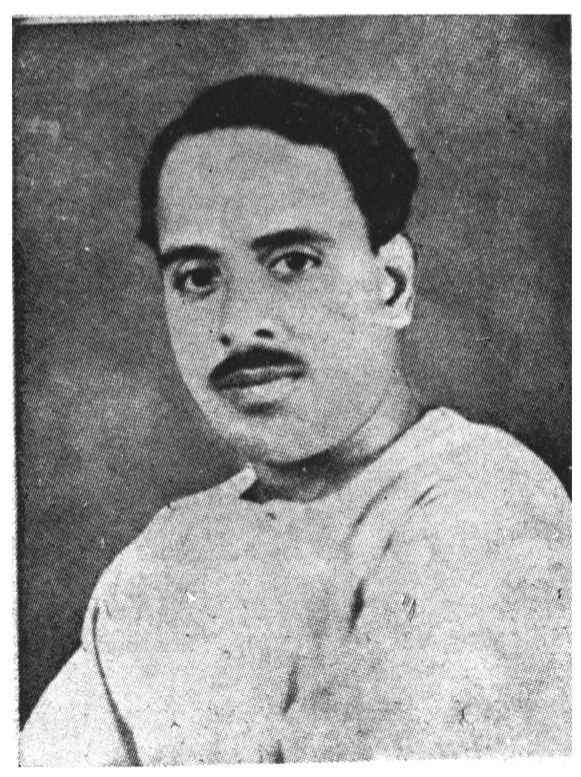
Annadurai in younger times

== Religion ==
Though Annadurai was an atheist in his personal life as he took oath as the Chief Minister of the state in the 'name of conscience' rather than in the 'name of god', he proclaimed as "Only one race, Only one God" (Ondre Kulam Oruvanae Devan) from the Tamil work Tirumantiram penned by Tirumular in order to unify the people of Tamil Nadu. Though secular to the core, he later described himself as a Hindu sans the sacred ash, a Christian minus the holy cross, and a Muslim without the prayer cap.

Annadurai stated he would attack superstitions and religious exploitation but would never fight against the spiritual values of society. He once explained his stance towards God and religion as "I do not break coconuts for Pillaiyar, (a form of worship) neither do I break his idols." (Nan Thengayum udaipathillai; Pillaiyarum Udaipathillai)

== Political career ==
=== Entry into politics ===
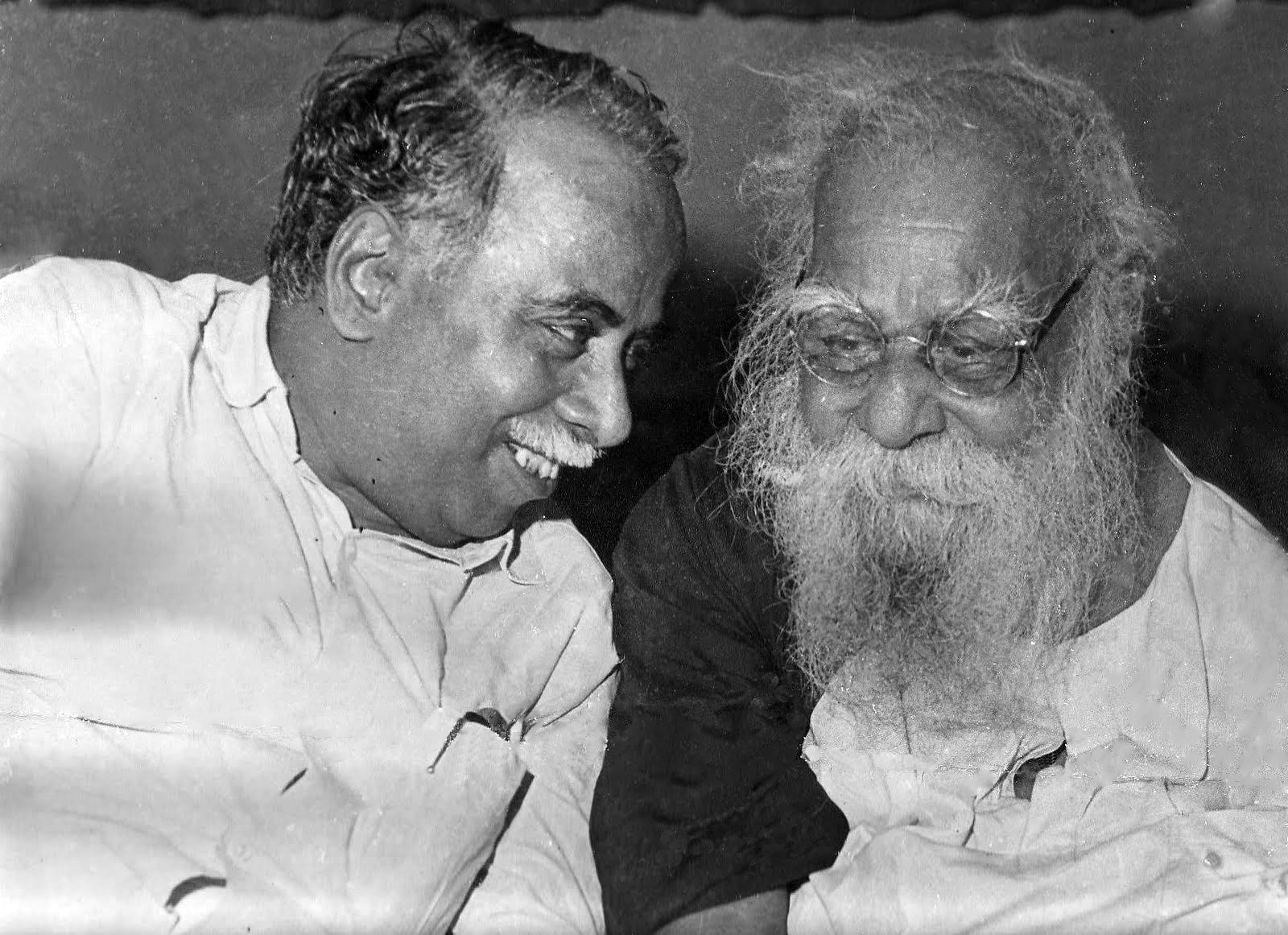
Annadurai and Periyar

Annadurai's interest in politics made him join the Justice party in 1935. The Justice party was formed by non-Brahmin elites in 1916. The Justice party originated with the Madras United League which was initially started as a work group that helped non-Brahmin students in Madras with accommodation and later grew into a political party under the efforts of leaders like C. Natesa Mudaliar, P. Theagaraya Chetty and T. M. Nair. The party was named South Indian Liberal Federation (S. I. L. F.) – popularly known as Justice party. The party had been in power in Madras Presidency since self-governance was introduced in 1920, until it was defeated by the Indian National Congress in 1937. By the time Annadurai joined the Justice party, Periyar was the party president. Annadurai served as the sub-editor of the Justice magazine. He later became the editor for Viduthalai (Freedom in English) and was also associated with the Tamil weekly paper, Kudi Arasu. He started his own journal Dravida Nadu (named after the Dravida Nadu – an independent state that the party called for). In 1944, Periyar renamed the Justice party to Dravidar Kazhagam and gave up contesting in the elections.

=== Differences with Periyar and birth of DMK ===
The Indian National Congress, which had been fighting for the independence of India from colonial British rule, was dominated by Brahmins. Periyar assumed that independent India would bring South Indians, especially Tamils, under the dominance of Brahmins and North Indians. For these reasons Periyar called for 15 August 1947, the day of Indian independence, to be a day of mourning. Annadurai opposed this move and the schism between his supporters and Periyar widened. He saw the gaining of independence as an overall achievement of India rather than solely that of Aryan North. Moreover, Periyar's decision on giving up participating in democratic elections was also opposed by Annadurai, in reaction to which he walked out of a party meeting in 1948. Periyar considered that candidates in elections must compromise their ideologies. Moreover, it was Periyar's idea that social reformation can be better achieved outside politics, through education and canvassing the masses, rather than governments. Eventually, when Periyar married Maniammai, who was 40 years younger than him, the personal differences between Annadurai and Periyar split their supporters. Annadurai launched his own party with his party fragment, along with E. V. K. Sampath (Periyar's nephew and until then considered his political heir). The new party was named Dravida Munnetra Kazhagam. DMK's presence was initially restricted to urban centres and its surrounding areas. But by appealing to the urban lower, lower middle and working classes, students, Dalits and lower castes, Annadurai was able to accelerate its growth and spread. He fought for the social justice of the lower castes and thus rapidly gained popular support.

=== Protests in 1953 ===
In 1953, Annadurai directed the DMK to undertake three protests:

- Condemning Jawaharlal Nehru, the then Prime Minister of India, for describing the damaging Hindi letters in railway station boards by DK and DMK activists as "childish nonsense"
- Against C. Rajagopalachari (or Rajaji), the then chief minister of Madras State, for introducing a new educational system that indirectly encouraged traditional caste-based occupations called Kula Kalvi Thittam
- Against renaming Kallakkudi, Dalmiyapuram as the name Dalmiyapuram symbolised north Indian domination. He was eventually sentenced to three months imprisonment in this protest.

=== Dravida Nadu ===
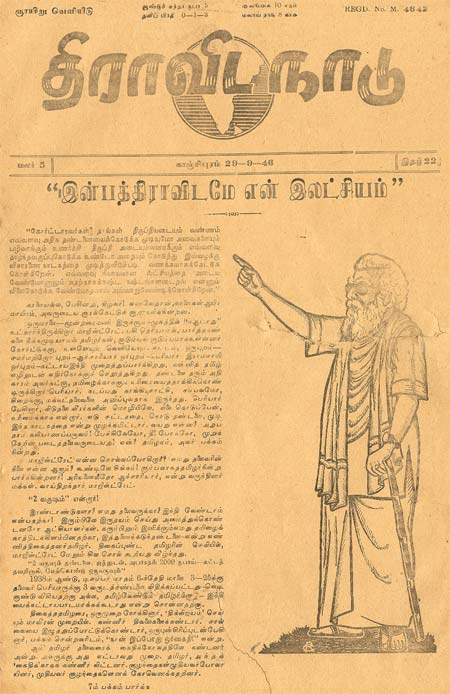
Dravida Nadu magazine owned and edited by Annadurai

During his days in Dravida Kazhagam, Annadurai had supported Periyar's call for an independent Dravida Nadu. The claim for such an independent state stayed alive in the initial days of DMK. E. V. K. Sampath, who had earlier forfeited his inheritance from Periyar to join DMK, saw the call for Dravida Nadu as an unrealistic goal. Responding to Sampath's concern, Annadurai said

We must contest more elections, win more seats and that way, win the confidence of the people; and when it is hot, we can strike and strike hard

Sampath's opposition to using film stars made him cross swords with many other members of the party. Eventually, with looming differences with Annadurai and other leaders on Dravida Nadu, Sampath left the DMK and formed his own party, the Tamil Nationalist Party, in 1961. In 1962, Annadurai said in the Rajya Sabha that Dravidians want the right of self-determination ... We want a separate country for southern India.

However, the reorganisation of states in India on linguistic basis removed Kannada, Telugu and Malayalam speaking regions from the Madras Presidency leaving behind a predominantly Tamil Madras State. Giving in to realities, Annadurai and his DMK changed the call of independent Dravida Nadu for Dravidians to independent Tamil Nadu for Tamils. Annadurai felt that remaining in the Indian Union meant accepting linguistic domination and economic backwardness. Nevertheless, the Sino-Indian war brought about changes in the Indian constitution. The Sixteenth Amendment (most popularly known as the Anti-Secessionist Amendment) banned any party with sectarian principles from participating in elections. When this amendment was presented in the Parliament of India, Annadurai was one of its members. He vehemently debated against the amendment, but eventually could not stop it from being passed. Faced with the new constitutional changes, Annadurai and his DMK left the call for an independent Tamil homeland on the back burner. From then on Annadurai and his DMK aimed at achieving better co-operation between the southern states and claimed more autonomy for Tamil Nadu.

On the party's position, Annadurai said

To make the Dravidian state a separate state was our ideal. A situation has arisen where we can neither talk nor write about this ideal. Of course we can destroy the party by undertaking to violate the prohibition. But once the party itself is destroyed there will not be any scope for the ideal to exist or spread. That is why we had to give up the ideal.

== Anti-Hindi agitations ==
Hindi was first recommended to be an apt language for official purposes in India by a committee headed by Motilal Nehru in 1928. This move was opposed by people and politicians of Tamil Nadu, since they considered that it would make them second class citizens when compared to that of native Hindi speaking North Indians.

== Protests of 1938 ==
In 1938, the Congress government in Madras Presidency headed by C. Rajagopalachari (popularly known as Rajaji) proposed the use of Hindi language as a compulsory language in schools. This move was opposed by Tamil leaders. Annadurai, along with other Tamil scholars including the poet Bharathidasan, held demonstrations. Annadurai participated in the first Anti Hindi imposition conference held in Kanchipuram on 27 February 1938. Two members of the protest, Thalamuthu and Natarajan, died as a consequence of police beating the same year. With overwhelming opposition, the government of Madras Presidency finally withdrew the order in 1940. he stated that "you learn English for world communication and learn Hindi for communication in India, it seems like big door for big cat and small door for small cat, why not let the small cat also enter in big door".

== Madras Anti Hindi agitation, 1965 ==
When India became a republic with its own constitution in 1950, the constitution had given special status to the Hindi language, which was to gain official status after 15 years in 1965. This move was regarded with anxiety by students in Tamil Nadu. Speaking of making Hindi as official language of India, Annadurai said It is claimed that Hindi should be the common language because it is spoken by the majority. Why should we then claim the tiger as our national animal instead of the rat which is so much more numerous? Or the peacock as our national bird when the crow is ubiquitous?. In view of continued threat to impose Hindi, the DMK held an open-air conference against Hindi imposition at Kodambakkam, Chennai in August 1960, which Annadurai presided over. He gave black flags to leading functionaries, to be shown to the President of India during his visit to the state. Sensing an uprising, Prime Minister Jawaharlal Nehru assured in the Parliament that English would continue to be the official language of India, as long as non-Hindi speaking people desire. DMK gave up the plan of showing black flags and Annadurai appealed to the Union Government to bring about a constitutional amendment incorporating the assurance.

With no constitutional amendment done, Annadurai declared 26 January 1965, the 15th Republic Day of India and also the day the Constitution, which in essence enshrined Hindi as the official language of India, came into practice, as a day of mourning. This move was opposed by the then Chief Minister of Madras State, Bhakthavatchalam, as blasphemous. Hence Annadurai, who by then had been trying to shake off the secessionist image of his party, declared 24 January as a day of mourning. He also replaced the slogan of the protests to Down with Hindi; Long live the Republic. Nevertheless, violence broke out on 26 January, initially in Madurai which within days spread throughout the state. Robert Hardgrave Jr, professor of humanities, government and Asian studies, suggests that the elements contributing to the riots were not instigated by DMK or Leftists or even the industrialists, as the Congress government of the state suggested, but were genuine frustrations and discontentment which lay beneath the surface of the people of the state.

With violence surging, Annadurai asked the students to forfeit the protests, but some DMK leaders like Karunanidhi kept the agitations going. Nevertheless, Annadurai was arrested for instigating the agitation. Although the violence were not directly instigated by the DMK, the agitation itself aided DMK to win the 1967 elections and Annadurai became the new Chief Minister of Madras State.

=== Literary contributions ===
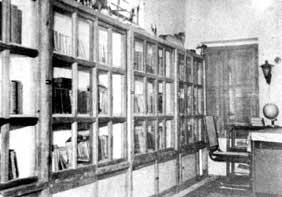
Annadurai, known for his excellent oratorical skills, was fond of books. This image shows his private library.

Annadurai was known as one of the best Tamil orators during his time. He developed a style in Tamil public speaking using metaphors and pleasing alliterations, both in spoken and written language. Annadurai was also best known for his extempore speaking ability being very well affluent on rhetoric skills.

He has published several novels, short stories and plays which incorporate political themes. He himself acted in some of his plays during his time in the Dravidar Kazhagam. He introduced movie media as a major organ for propaganda of Dravidian politics. In total Annadurai scripted six screen plays.

His first movie Nallathambi (Good Brother, 1948) which starred N. S. Krishnan promoted cooperative farming and abolition of zamindari system. His novels such as Velaikaari (Servant Maid, 1949) and Or Iravu, which were later made into movies, carried the hallmarks of propaganda for Dravidian politics. On Velaikari, Annadurai said that the movie

made it clear that greed and avarice of the rich did not pay in the long run.[...] Some of the elementary principles of socialism and stressed that we should depend upon our own labour for our progress and well being and not some unknown factor.

Velaikari made direct references against the suppressive landlords who were traditionally allied with Jawaharlal Nehru and Gandhi. His movies had some elements of Dravidian political ideologies like anti-Brahminism and messages differing against Congress with detailed reasons and scenarios behind. Popular stage and cine actors who stood by Annadurai in early years were D. V. Narayanasamy, K. R. Ramasamy, N. S. Krishnan, S. S. Rajendran, Sivaji Ganesan and M. G. Ramachandran.

Some of his books had a social approach and its content were debatable, such as "Arya Mayai" (Aryan Illusion) in which he highlighted the view point of bringing an equal living society regardless of any caste dominance and especially drawing similarities which existed by then of the upper-caste Brahmin (Aryan) people. He was fined INR 700 for sedition and was also sent to prison.

Some of his well-known works are his books Annavin Sattasabai Sorpolivukal (Anna's speeches at the state legislative, 1960), Ilatchiya varalaru (History of Ideals, 1948), Valkkaip puyal (Storm of life, 1948) and Rankon rata (Radha from Rangon). His work Kambarasam criticises Ramayana of Kamban. His works of fiction such as Kapothipura kathal (Love in the city of Blind), Parvathy B.A., Kalinga rani (Queen of Kalinga) and Pavayin payanam (Travels of a young lady) carried elements of political propaganda.

At times when Dravida Munnetra Kazhagam was extensively using movies for its propaganda, censorship crippled the process. To evade censorships, DMK movies used Annadurai's popular nickname Anna, which also means elder brother in Tamil, as a pun. When praises were bestowed on the Anna on screen, the crowd would break into applause. Kannadasan has criticised Anna's works that apart from Sivaji Kanda Hindu Rajyam and Needhi Devan Mayakkam, the rest lacked even a plot.

== Posts held ==
The provincial conference of the DMK was held at Tiruchirappalli in May 1956. Annadurai stepped down from the General Secretaryship of the party, and Nedunchezhian was elected to that position. It was at the Tiruchirappalli conference that the party decided to contest free India's second general elections which were to be held in 1957. The DMK secured 15 Assembly seats and two parliamentary seats. Annadurai was elected from his home constituency, Kanchipuram for the first time to the Madras Legislative Assembly. In that election, the DMK won 15 seats and Annadurai became the de facto leader of the opposition in the state. In 1962, the DMK emerged as the major political party in the state outside the Congress, winning 50 seats in the Assembly. Although Annadurai himself lost the elections, he was nominated as a member of parliament to the upper house (Rajya Sabha).

== As chief minister ==
In 1967, the Congress lost nine states to opposition parties, but it was only in Madras state that a single non-Congress party majority was achieved. The electoral victory of 1967 is also reputed to an electoral fusion among the non-Congress parties to avoid a split in the Opposition votes. Rajagopalachari, a former senior leader of the Congress party, had by then left the Congress and launched the right-wing Swatantra Party. He played a vital role in bringing about the electoral fusion among the opposition parties to align against the Congress. At that time, his cabinet was the youngest in the country.

Annadurai legalised self-respect marriages for the first time in the country. Such marriages were void of priests to preside over the ceremony and thus did not need a Brahmin to carry out the wedding. Self-respect marriages were a brainchild of Periyar, who regarded the then conventional marriages as mere financial arrangements which often caused great debt through dowry. Self-Respect marriages, according to him, encouraged inter-caste marriages and caused arranged marriages to be replaced by love marriages. Annadurai was also the first to use subsidising of the price of rice for election victory. He promised one rupee a measure of rice, which he initially implemented once in government, but had to withdraw later. Subsidising rice costs are still used as an election promise in Tamil Nadu.

It was Annadurai's government that renamed the Madras State to its present-day form declaring officially as Tamil Nadu. The name change itself was first presented in the upper house (Rajya Sabha) of the Parliament of India by Bhupesh Gupta, a communist MP from West Bengal, but was then defeated. With Annadurai as chief minister, the state assembly succeeded in passing the bill renaming the states.

Annadurai was instrumental in organising the World Tamil Conference under the aegies of UNESCO in 1967. Another major achievement of Annadurai's government was to introduce a two language policy over the then popular three language formula. The three language formula, which was implemented in the neighbouring states of Karnataka, Andhra Pradesh and Kerala, entitled students to study three languages: the regional language, English and Hindi. It was during the period of his Chief Ministership that the Second World Conference was conducted on a grand scale on 3 January 1968. Nevertheless, when a commemorative stamp was released to mark the Tamil conference, Annadurai expressed his dissatisfaction that the stamp contained Hindi when it was for Tamil. Annadurai also issued an order for the removal of the pictures of gods and religious symbols from public offices and buildings. He proceeded on a world tour as an invitee of the Yale University's Chubb Fellowship Programme and was also a guest of the State Department in the US in April–May 1968. He was awarded the Chubb Fellowship at Yale University. The same year he was awarded an honorary doctorate from Annamalai University.

== Death ==
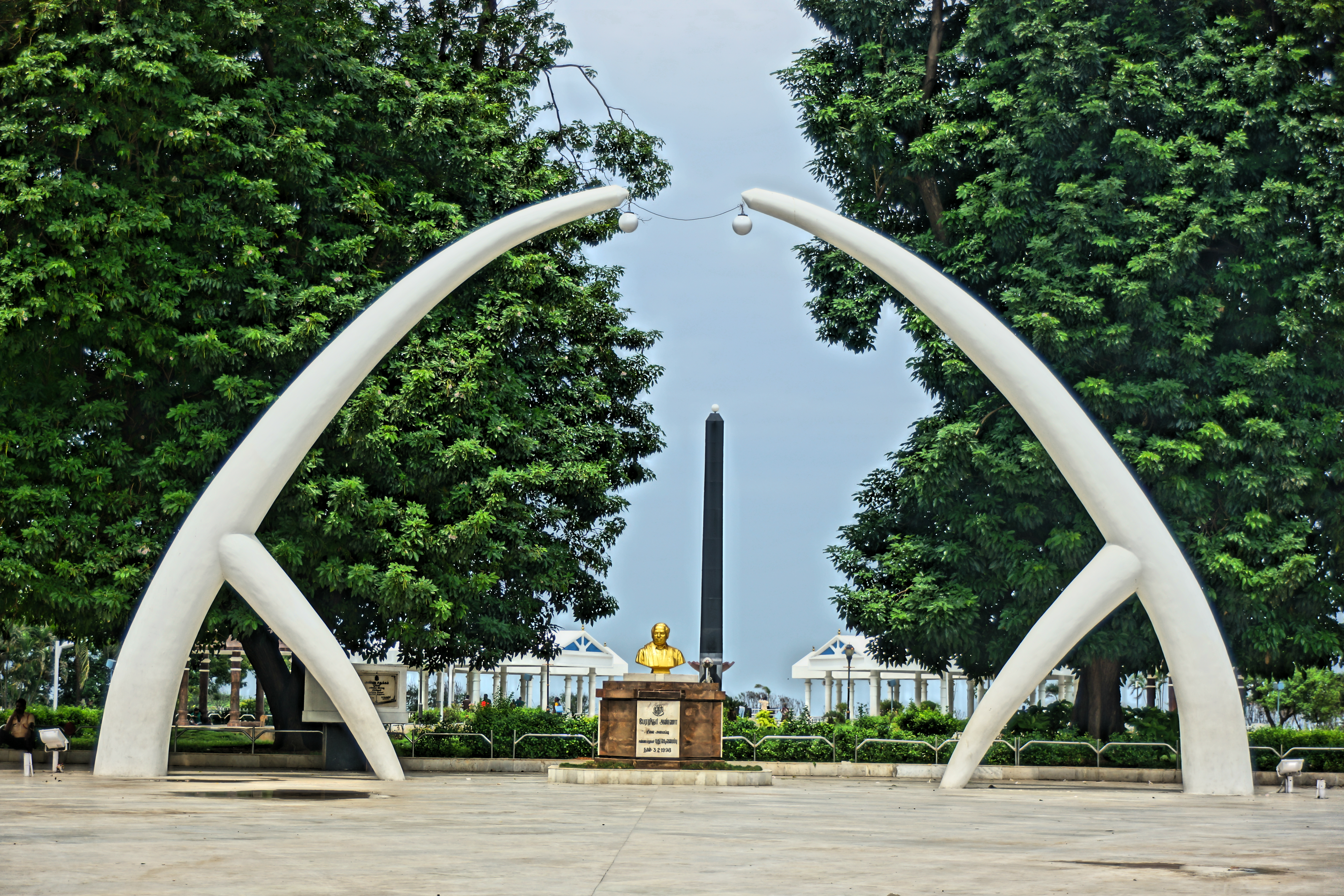
Annadurai memorial

On 10 September 1968 Annadurai travelled to New York for medical treatment and he was operated for cancer in the gullet at the Memorial Sloan Kettering Cancer Center. He returned to Chennai in November and continued to address several official functions against medical advice. His health deteriorated further and he died on 3 February 1969. His cancer was attributed to his habit of chewing tobacco. His funeral holds the record for highest number of attendees, as registered with The Guinness Book of Records. An estimated 15 million people attended it. His remains were buried in the northern end of Marina Beach, which is now called Anna Memorial.

== Legacy ==
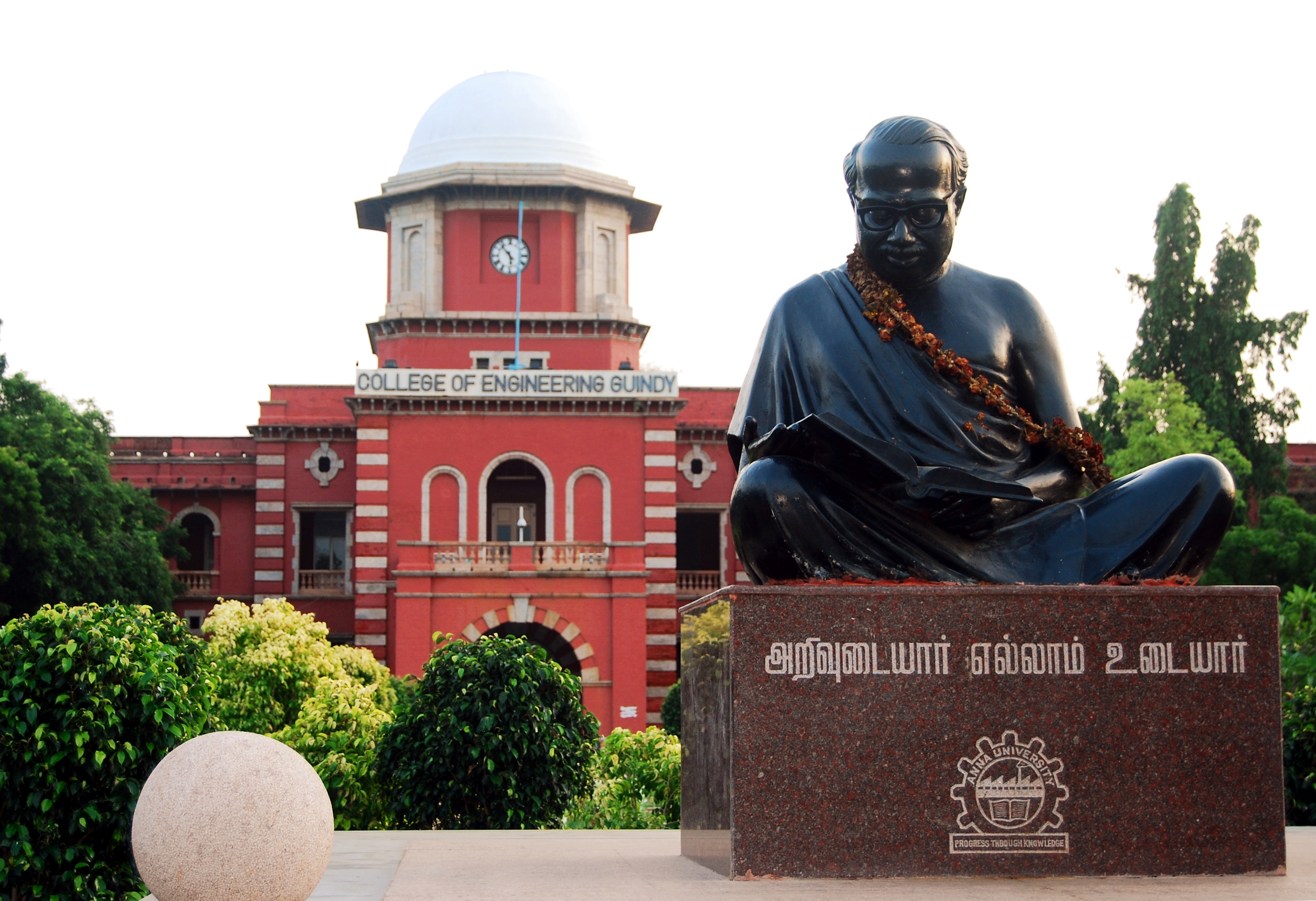
The statue of Annadurai at the College of Engineering, Guindy campus of Anna University which is named after him

After his electoral success with his DMK in 1967, the Congress has not yet returned to power in Tamil Nadu. His government was the first in the country to be from a non-Congress party with full majority. When the DMK later split, with M. G. Ramachandran forming his own Dravidian party, the rebel fragment was named after Annadurai as Anna DMK. Anna Nagar, a residential neighbourhood in Chennai is named after him. Sri Lankan Tamil nationalist leaders and writers are considered to be influenced by Annadurai's chaste Tamil movement. Anna University, a premier institution in science and technology was named after him. DMK's current head office built in 1987 is named after him as Anna Arivalayam. One of the major roads in Chennai was named in his honour, Anna Salai—it was previously called Mount Road, and a statue of Annadurai now stands there. The central government issued a commemorative coin of ₹ 5 denomination to mark the centenary celebrations of him on 15 September 2009 in Chennai. Jawaharlal Nehru hailed him as one of the great parliamentarians for speeches in Rajya Sabha. Selig Harrison, a US-based analyst of South Asian and East Asian politics and journalism commented,

There is no doubt that this powerful orator is the single-most popular mass figure in the region

The magazine India Today has listed Annadurai in its "Top 100 people who shaped India by thought, action, art, culture and spirit". In 2010, Anna Centenary Library was established in Chennai in remembrance of Annadurai.

A life-size statue of Annadurai was unveiled on 1 October 2002 in the Parliament House by then President of India, A.P.J. Abdul Kalam in his honour and the function was attended by notable politicians.

On 31 July 2020, Alandur metro station in Chennai has been renamed as Arignar Anna Alandur Metro by Government of Tamil Nadu to honour him.

His wife Rani Annadurai did not enter active politics after his death. She contested from Bangalore North Lok Sabha constituency in 1977 Indian general election and lost. She died in 1996 at Chennai. They never had any children and hence they have adopted the four sons of Annadurai's elder sister namely Parimalam, Ilangovan, Gowthaman and Rajendra Babu. The granddaughter of Parimalam is Prithika Rani, an Indian Foreign Service officer of 2019 batch.

== Filmography ==
Year	Film	Credits
1949	Velaikaari	Story, Screenplay and Dialogues
1949	Nallathambi	Story, Screenplay and Dialogues
1951	Or Iravu	Story and Dialogues
1954	Sorgavasal	Story and Dialogues
1956	Rangoon Radha	Story
1959	Thaai Magalukku Kattiya Thaali	Story
1961	Nallavan Vazhvaan	Story
1962	Edhayum Thangum Idhayam	Story
1970	Kadhal Jothi	Story
1978	Vandikaaran Magan	Story

Annadurai's first movie script, of his play Velaikkari, fetched him a fee of ₹ 12,000, a considerable sum at that time (worth ₹ 1 crore in 2015 prices)

Apart from his stories, the names of some of Annadurai's works were used as film titles for Panathottam (1963), Valiba virundhu (1967), Kumarikottam (1971), Rajapart Rangadurai (1973), Needhi devan mayakkam (1982).

== Bibliography ==
=== Fiction ===
Year	Type	Work	First appeared in
1939	Novella	Komalathin Kobam	Kudi arasu
1939	Novella	Kabothipura Kadhal	Kudi arasu
1942	Novella	Kumasthavin penn or	Dravida Nadu
1942	Novella	Kalingarani	Dravida Nadu
1943	Novella	Parvathi B.A	Dravida Nadu
1943	Play	Chandrodhayam	
1945	Novella	Dasavatharam	Dravida Nadu
1945	Play	Sivaji kanda Hindu samrajyam	
1946	Play	Velaikaari	
1946	Novella	Kumari kottam	Dravida Nadu
1946	Novella	Rangoon Radha	Dravida Nadu
1947	Play	Needhidevan mayakkam	
1947	Parable	Kadhiravan Kaneen	Dravida Nadu
1948	Play	Nallathambi	
1948	Play	Or iravu	
1948	Novella	En vazhvu	Dravida Nadu
1953	Play	Sorgavasal	
1953	Play	Kadhal jothi	
1955	Parable	Kumari Surya	Dravida Nadu
1955	Parable	Nangai Nagaithaal	Dravida Nadu
1955	Parable	Oru muttalin kadhai	Dravida Nadu
1955	Play	Pavayin payanam	
1956	Novella	Pudhiya polivu	Dravida Nadu
1957	Novella	Kadaisi kanavu	Dravida Nadu
1965	Novella	Thazhumbukal	Kanchi
1965	Novella	Vandikaaran magan	Kanchi
1968	Novella	appodhae sonnen	Kanchi
1970	Play	Inba oli	Kanchi and Dravida nadu
	Novella	Romapuri Raanigal	Kanchi and Dravida nadu

=== Nonfiction ===
Year	Title
1947	Kambarasam
1948	Ariyamayai

== In popular culture ==
A scene from the film Thangarathinam (1960) shows real footage of Annadurai and other DMK leaders speaking at the Tirāviṭa camutāya cīrtirutta mānāṭu (Dravidian Community Reform Conference) held in Palani on 17 September 1960. A group of protagonists in the film are seen attending the conference. The group is shown as belonging to a reformist organisation named Thirukkural Munnanik Kazhagam (Tamil: திருக்குறள் முன்னணிக் கழகம்). Its acronym in Tamil is an allusion to the DMK (திமுக).

In a scene from the film Iru Kodugal (1969), District Collector Janaki (Sowcar Janaki), meets the Chief Minister of Tamil Nadu. The Chief Minister is not seen directly. Instead, C.N.Annadurai's voice (as imitated by Sivagangai Sethurajan) is heard. Also, a pair of glasses on the table and a pen in the foreground are seen.

The song sequence "Nee mannavana chinnavana" from the film Rudra Thandavam (1978) shows real footage of Annadurai's funeral.

In the film Walter Vetrivel (1993), Vijayakumar played Viswanathan (Tamil Nadu Minister for Home Affairs as per the plot). The actor's countenance in the film strongly resembles Annadurai.

In the film Iruvar (1997), Nassar played Ayya Veluthambi, a character whose role is reminiscent of Annadurai.

Annadurai is portrayed in the film Kamaraj (2004).

S. S. Stanley played Annadurai in the film Periyar (2007). Directed by Gnana Rajasekaran, the film had Sathyaraj in the lead role of Periyar, Annadurai's mentor. After Annadurai's death (not shown in the film), his real life photo is seen in the table of M. Karunanidhi, who succeeded him as Chief Minister of Tamil Nadu.

The song sequence "Nee kondru kuvithatu" from the film Indiralohathil Na Azhagappan (2008) shows real footage of Annadurai.

Bharathi Kannan played Annadurai in the film Thalaivii (2021).

== See also ==
- List of places named after C. N. Annadurai
- Annadurai ministry

Party political offices
New creation	General Secretary of the Dravida Munnetra Kazhagam; 1949–1969	Succeeded by V. R. Nedunchezhiyan
Assembly seats
Preceded by Deivasigamani	Member of Madras State Legislative Assembly; 1957–1962	Succeeded by S. V. Natesa Mudaliar
Preceded by Himself as Chief Minister of Madras State	Chief Minister of Tamil Nadu; 1969–1969	Succeeded by V. R. Nedunchezhiyan (acting)
