= Thamizhaga Munnetra Munnani =

Defunct political party in India

Thamizhaga Munnetra Munnani (transl. Tamil Nadu Progressive Front) was a short-lived political party founded by veteran Tamil film actor Sivaji Ganesan that existed from 10 February 1988 to December 1989. Sivaji Ganesan had a long running relation with many political parties, with his first movie itself being a movie of Dravida Munnetra Kazhagam (DMK).This party also contested on ladder symbol in 1989 election.

The party was born on 10 February 1988 after a split in the Tamil Nadu faction of the Indian National Congress. The split itself was after another party All India Anna Dravida Munnetra Kazhagam (ADMK) broke into two fragments one led by J. Jayalalithaa and other by V. N. Janaki and R. M. Veerappan. Ganesan and his supporters left the Congress on differences in opinion on which fragment of ADMK to ally with in 1989 state elections.

Thamizhaga Munnetra Munnani backed V. N. Janaki Ramachandran's fragment of the party and lost in all seats it competed for. Ganesan eventually regretted his decision to float his own party and merged the party with Janata Dal in December 1989.

== History ==
Sivaji Ganesan was one of the foremost stars of Tamil film industry. Born as V. C. Ganesan, he was christened Sivaji by Periyar, who was then leading the Dravidar Kazhagam and the Self-respect movement, in the 1940s. He debuted in the Tamil movie Parasakthi in 1952, a movie which heavily contained elements of Dravidian politics. Although Ganesan was a member of the Dravida Munnetra Kazhagam he found that atheistic outlook of the party to cost him his movie fame. He was also frustrated with importance given to M. G. Ramachandran, another movie star, in the party. But yet he stayed on in the party until his visit to Tirumala Venkateswara Temple became a center of controversy within the DMK. Responding to the controversy Ganesan called the DMK "a glamour party" and moved to Tamil National Party. The Tamil National Party was itself formed by former members of DMK such as E. V. K. Sampath and Kannadasan. Later Ganesan joined the Indian National Congress when Tamil National Party was merged with it.

== Birth of Thamizhaga Munnetra Munnani ==
M. G. Ramachandran had been heading the All India Anna Dravida Munnetra Kazhagam (ADMK) as its founder after his feud with M. Karunanidhi in 1972. He had been the Chief Minister of Tamil Nadu since 1977 until his death in 1987. Soon after his death the party broke into two, one headed by Tamil movie star J. Jayalalithaa and other by MGR's wife V. N. Janaki Ramachandran. Election Commission of India refused to accept either of them as the original ADMK. Tamil Nadu Congress decided to ally with only united AIADMK.

This move was opposed by Sivaji Ganesan and hence he left the party along with his supporters to form the new party Thamizhaga Munnetra Munnani on 10 February 1988. To popularise the party Ganesan produce a movie titled En Thamizh En Makkal (My Tamil language and my people). At the time the party was created it was considered to be pro-Liberation Tigers of Tamil Eelam (LTTE) along with ADMK faction led by R. M. Veerappan. The party opposed the presence of Indian Peace Keeping Force in Sri Lanka stating that the force was trying to wipe out the LTTE and its leader V. Prabhakaran. The party also urged the Government of India to hold talks with the LTTE without any pre- condition.

== Merger with Janata Dal ==
The party lost every seat it contested for in the 1989 elections. Sivaji himself lost at Thiruvaiyaru to a DMK candidate by a margin of 10,643 votes. Soon after the election he dissolved the party and asked his party cadres to join Janata Dal which he himself did after an invitation from V. P. Singh. Sivaji made as state president of Janata Dal. Later in his life Sivaji Ganesan regretted to have ever floated his own party and reportedly said:

Many of the people with me were professional politicians. They had to remain in politics necessarily to make a living. I was compelled to start a party for their sake, although I did not require it.

On other occasion he added:

The votes that I secured came from people of another party. It is true that I was defeated. This was a big disappointment and a very difficult situation that I faced. What could one do? When we take wrong decisions, we have to face disappointments.

== See also ==
- Indian National Congress breakaway parties
