= Dravidian parties =

Political parties in Tamil Nadu, India

Dravidian parties include an array of regional political parties in the state of Tamil Nadu, India, which trace their origins and ideologies either directly or indirectly to the Justice Party and the Dravidian movement of C. Natesanar and Periyar E. V. Ramasamy. The Dravidian movement was based on the linguistic divide in India, where most of the Northern Indian, Eastern Indian and Western Indian languages are classified as Indo-Aryan, whereas the South Indian languages are classified as Dravidian. Dravidian politics has developed by associating itself to the Dravidian community. The original goal of Dravidian politics was to achieve social equality, but it later championed the cause of ending the domination of North India over the politics and economy of the South Indian province known as the Madras Presidency.

Most Dravidian parties are offshoots of Dravidar Kazhagam (DK). There are also a few other parties in Tamil Nadu that did not arise from DK directly. Nevertheless, both the former and the latter are considered as Dravidian parties because of the similarities of their ideals and goals. Dravida Munnetra Kazhagam (DMK) and its political rival All India Anna Dravida Munnetra Kazhagam (AIADMK) have been the major players among the Dravidian parties since the mid-1960s. Since the 1967 legislative assembly elections, only the DMK and the AIADMK have formed governments in Tamil Nadu. These two parties are political rivals. Barring political alliances with the DMK or AIADMK, since the 1990s no other political party has won more than a few seats in the Indian parliament or state legislative assembly of Tamil Nadu. Since 1996, members of the DMK and AIADMK have held portfolios in the cabinet of the central Indian government. Another Dravidian party is Marumalarchi Dravida Munnetra Kazhagam.

Political media is pervasive in Dravidian politics, with five of the seven chief ministers from these parties being directly involved in Tamil cinema, either as script writers or actors. Recently television channels owned by these parties have been used for political propaganda purposes.

== Rise of Dravidian politics ==
=== Background ===
Most of the population of India are classified as Aryans and Dravidians. Based on language families, most northern Indian languages are classified as Aryan, whereas most southern Indian languages are Dravidian languages. One of the first European scholars to expound the concept of "Aryans" as a race was German philologist and Orientalist Max Müller, who claimed that a group of people called Aryans had invaded the Indian subcontinent c. 1500 B.C. Sanskrit, a classical language of the Aryan group, was considered to be a sacred language, whereas in the Madras Presidency of British India, it was a commonly held opinion in that the Dravidian tongues were inferior. The linguistic divide was even more pronounced given the political dominance of Brahmins in South India.

The Brahmins, who occupied the highest strata in the society, accounted for 3% of the population in Madras Presidency, but held 60 to 79% of the positions in major government departments in the early 20th century. It was observed by some non-Brahmin leaders from the south that Brahmins were Aryans, and hence non-natives, who had taken positions in the government that should rightfully be filled by people indigenous to the area. The antipathy towards Sanskrit compounded with the animosity against the hegemony of Brahmins paved the way for the rise of Dravidian politics in Madras Presidency.

=== Early Dravidian politics ===
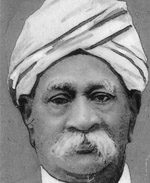
Sir P. Theagaroya Chetty was one of the founders of Justice Party in 1916.

An early pioneer in Dravidian politics was Iyothee Thass in the late 19th century. His efforts brought together the non-Brahmin caste Dravidians with the establishment of the Dravida Mahajana Sabha organisation in 1891. A major leap in Dravidian politics was the formation of the Madras United League by non-Brahmin intellectuals, who considered the dominance of Brahmins in civil administration a threat to the non-Brahmin majority. The League was initially started as a workgroup that helped non-Brahmin students in Madras with accommodation by Dr C. Natesan. It later grew into a political party under the efforts of leaders like C Natesa Mudaliar, Sir Pitti Theagaroya Chetty and Dr. T. M. Nair. The party was named South Indian Liberal Federation (S. I. L. F.) – popularly known as the Justice party.

=== Justice Party era ===
A limited form of self governance was introduced in British India after World War I. While the Justice Party saw this as an opportunity to displace Brahmin dominance, the British colonial government considered it favourable, since the Indian National Congress, which spearheaded the Indian independence movement was dominated by Brahmins. The Justice party emerged as a winner in the 1920 general elections and brought about the reforms it had campaigned for, including establishing communal reservation through affirmative action for the first time in the country, and brought temples under state control. Soon after their electoral success the animosity between Tamil and non-Tamil members deepened, thus weakening the party. Nevertheless, the Justice Party electorally dominated the presidency for 17 years until it was defeated by the Indian National Congress party in 1937. Although out of power, the Justice Party was involved in demonstrations across the Province against the introduction of Hindi as a compulsory subject of study in schools by a Congress-led government, which led to the detainment of scores of Tamil scholars, academics and Justice Party leaders. This and other struggles for social justice helped create the social base of what emerged as the Dravidian Movement.

=== Dravidar Kazhagam ===
The next few years saw a decline in the Justice Party's popularity. In 1938, the by then badly weakened party sought the leadership of Periyar E. V. Ramasamy, a leader of the Dravidian Movement, who became its president. In 1944, Periyar changed the name of the party to Dravidar Kazhagam ("Dravidian Organisation" in English). This move was opposed by some members of the Party who continued contesting elections as the Justice Party under the leadership of P. T. Rajan until 1957. Periyar as the president of Dravidiar Kazhagam considered that contesting in elections would lead to compromises in principles and withdrew Dravida Kazhagam from parliamentary politics.

== Dravida Munnetra Kazhagam ==
=== Birth of DMK ===
In 1947, when India attained independence, Periyar called for members of the Dravidar Kazhagam to boycott the celebrations. According to him, the Indian National Congress was dominated by Brahmins. He predicted that an independent India would bring South Indians, especially Tamils, under the dominance of Brahmins and North Indians. In other words, according to Periyar, independence would lead to the replacement of British dominance with Brahmin and North Indian dominance. He felt an independent nation called Dravida Nadu for the South Indians would be the best solution. Periyar declared 15 August 1947, the day of Indian independence, as a day of mourning. This move was opposed by other leaders within the party, including C. N. Annadurai. Annadurai viewed independence as an achievement for all of India rather than solely of the North. On 9 July 1948 Periyar married a woman 40 years his junior, leading to a split in the party. The leaders of the splitting faction eventually formed a new party, Dravida Munnetra Kazhagam or DMK (Progressive Dravidian Organisation in English), in 1949.

=== Independent Dravida Nadu ===
Although initially both DK and DMK sought an independent Dravida Nadu, DK later moved on to work on bringing social changes whereas DMK leaders such as C. N. Annadurai and E. V. K. Sampath endeavoured to achieve their goals through parliamentary election processes. Sampath, who had earlier forfeited his seniority with Periyar's party to join DMK, saw the call for an independent Dravida Nadu was turning out to be an unrealistic goal. Sampath expressed concerns over using film stars to increase the popularity of the party. His views led him to cross swords with the major leaders of the party and eventually caused the first split in DMK. Sampath left DMK to begin his own party called the Tamil National Party. Although leaders like Annadurai were firm in their separatist stance, the reorganisation of states in India on a linguistic basis removed Kannada, Telugu and Malayalam speaking regions from Madras Presidency, leaving behind a predominantly Tamil Madras State. Giving in to political realities, Annadurai and his DMK changed their call for an independent Dravida Nadu for Dravidians to an independent Tamil Nadu for Tamils. Annadurai saw that remaining in union with India meant accepting linguistic domination and economic backwardness. However, the Sino-Indian war brought about changes in the Indian constitution. The Sixteenth Amendment (also known as the Anti-Secessionist Amendment) banned any party with sectarian principles from contesting elections. Consequently, DMK preferred to keep the issue of Dravida Nadu on the backburner. From then on DMK's main focus targeted the dominance of North Indians in the Union Government of India.

=== DMK government ===
After dropping the demand for an independent Dravida Nadu, DMK changed its focus to the problems arising out of the disparity between North and South India. The DMK considered that the south was neglected by delays in sanctioning development projects and allotment of funds. Thus the Congress-led Central government became its major target for calls for reform. Immediately after Indian independence the Congress Party was popular throughout India and thus formed the government in many states including Madras Presidency. Even so, the Congress Party failed to obtain an absolute majority in the presidency in the state's first election. By the 1960s the popularity of the Congress party was in a steady decline.

DMK leaders also perceived that the attempts to declare Hindi as the sole national language of India was an attempt impose an Aryan language unwilling people in the South. According to the terms of the Indian constitution dated 26 January 1965, English as an official language of India would come to an end and Hindi would become the sole official language. However, the Madras Anti-Hindi agitation in 1965 compelled the Central Government in India change its language policy, allowing English to continue as an official language. Although DMK was not directly involved in the violence that marred the agitation, the protest itself catapulted DMK to political power in the State in the 1967 legislative elections. Annadurai became the first non-Congress Chief Minister of the post-1950 Madras state as a result.

The electoral victory in 1967 led to an electoral fusion among the non-Congress parties to avoid a split in the Opposition votes. Rajagopalachari, a former senior leader of the Congress Party, had by then left the Congress and launched the right-wing Swatantra Party. He played a vital role in bringing about the electoral fusion amongst the opposition parties to align against the Congress.

== Split in DMK and birth of AIADMK ==
=== M. G. R. and the split from DMK ===
M. G. Ramachandran, popularly known as M. G. R., was an actor in Tamil cinema and a well-known propagator of Dravidian ideologies in his movies since 1953. In the 1970s, as the then treasurer of DMK, he played a vital role in popularizing the party, bringing many of his fans as supporters.

A political feud between M. G. R. and the party's president M. Karunanidhi has been ongoing since the death of Annadurai in 1969. M. G. R. helped Karunanidhi to become Chief minister. It arose from Karunanidhi calling himself the "Mujib of Tamil Nadu". Soon after the electoral victory of the DMK in 1971, some senior members expressed concern that M. G. R.'s popularity was growing strong within the party cadres.

Karunanidhi made several attempts to weaken M. G. R.'s position within the party. M. G. R. retaliated with corruption charges and a call for a boycott of the party's General Council. DMK's General Council suspended M. G. R. from the party stating that he had involved himself in "anti-party activities". Although M. G. R. had lost support from top-ranking leaders within the DMK, the strong public reaction following his suspension demonstrated his popular support among the party's volunteers. Inspired by this support from the party's lower cadres and his fans, M. G. R. launched his own party, the All India Anna Dravida Munnetra Kazhagam (AIADMK). It was named after his mentor C. N. Annadurai fondly known as Anna.

=== AIADMK government ===
M. G. R. presented his new party to Indira Gandhi as the regional equivalent of her Congress (I) party. Indira Gandhi was the head of her party, which she split from the Indian National Congress with the support of lower cadres and opposition from senior party leaders. Thus AIADMK could show itself as an equally strong alternative to that of DMK with which Congress (I) could ally. From then on, the Congress (I) Party fought elections in the State in alliance with one of the two parties. Ever since then the Dravidian parties have helped the Congress (I) sustain itself in the State, but with limited ambitions.

In 1976, the DMK government, led by Karunanidhi, was dismissed under corruption charges by the Central government of India, led by Congress (I), which had by then allied with AIADMK.

== Further divisions ==
=== Further offshoots of DMK ===
Sivaji Ganesan, a veteran actor of Tamil Cinema, was a founding member of DMK party. The actor himself was nicknamed Sivaji by Periyar E. V. Ramasami after his role portraying the Maratha king. Nevertheless, differences between the party leadership and the actor widened since he perceived that M. G. Ramachandran, his acting contemporary, was given more prominence than himself. Furthermore, he started distancing himself from the party's anti-religious atheistic stance to satisfy his religious fans. Hence when E. V. K. Sampath launched his own splinter from DMK (in the name of Tamil National Party), Sivaji left DMK and joined Sampath. However, Tamil National Party itself was short-lived and was merged into Congress. Sivaji, although a member of Congress party, maintained distance from the party activities and concentrated more on his film career. After the death of M. G. Ramachandran in 1987, Sivaji re-launched his political career with his own party Thamizhaga Munnetra Munnani ("Tamil Nadu Development Front" in English). The party lost every single seat it contested for in the 1989 elections. Sivaji dissolved the party, asked his party cadres to join the Janata Dal and openly regretted his decision to have ever launched his own party.

The Marumalarchi Dravida Munnetra Kazhagam ("Progressive Dravidian Renaissance Organisation" in English, or MDMK) is yet another offshoot of the DMK. It was formed in May 1994, after V. Gopalswamy (popularly known as Vaiko), a senior leader and Member of Parliament from DMK, was expelled from the party. Barring, perhaps, their more radical support for an independent Tamil Eelam in the Sri Lankan crisis, the MDMK do not have major ideological differences with the other Dravidian parties. MDMK shares its goals with the DMK and AIADMK in respect to State autonomy, constitutional protection for the reservation formula and making Tamil an official language of the Indian Union. In 2004, Tamil film director and actor T. Rajendar who was earlier expelled from DMK launched the All India Latchiya Dravida Munnetra Kazhagam ("All India Principled Dravida Munnetra Kazhagam" in English).

=== Offshoots of AIADMK ===
Soon after MGR's death in 1987, his wife V. N. Janaki Ramachandran took over as Chief Minister of Tamil Nadu. This appointment was opposed by former actress and politician J. Jayalalithaa. The resistance from Jayalalithaa eventually led to the dismissal of the AIADMK government, the shortest lived government in the history of Tamil Nadu, by the Central Government of India then led by Rajiv Gandhi. The antagonism built up and the AIADMK split into two fragments.

The Election Commission of India refused to accept either of them as the successor of the original party and separate electoral symbols were allocated. The faction led by MGR's widow chose to use two doves, with a large dove holding leafy branch in its beak, as if feeding the smaller dove. Jayalalithaa's faction was represented by a crowing cock. Although both factions lost the 1989 state elections, Janaki's AIADMK won 2 seats when compared to 27 won by Jayalalithaa. Following the election defeat, Janaki retired from active politics and the two party factions rejoined into one party.

Other breakaways in AIADMK were witnessed in 1990s, when R. M. Veerappan and S. Tirunavukkarasu, due to personal differences with Jayalalithaa, formed MGR Kazhagam (MGR's Organisation) and MGR ADMK (MGR's and Anna's DMK) respectively.

=== Factions and reunification genealogy of contemporary Dravidian parties ===
Justice Party; 1917
Self-respect movement 1925
Dravidar Kazhagam; 1944	Justice Party (PTR)
Dravida Munnetra Kazhagam; 1949
Tamil National Party; 1962
Merger with Indian National Congress; 1964
All India Anna; Dravida Munnetra Kazhagam; 17 October 1972
Thazhthapattor Munnetra Kazhagam; 1974
Makkal Dravida Munnetra Kazhagam; 1977
Merger with AIADMK; 1977
M.G.R.'s death on 24 December 1987
AIADMK; Jayalalithaa faction	AIADMK; Janaki faction
Thamizhaga Munnetra Munnani; 1988
Merger with Janata Dal; 1989	AIADMK unifies again Janaki's faction dissolved and merged with Jayalalithaa's faction 1989
Marumalarchi; Dravida Munnetra Kazhagam; 1994
MGR Kazhagam; 1995
MGR Anna; DMK; 1996
Merger with Bharatiya Janata Party; 2002
Major Dravidian parties that are currently active	Dravidar Kazhagam	All India Anna; Dravida Munnetra Kazhagam	Marumalarchi; Dravida Munnetra Kazhagam	Dravida Munnetra Kazhagam

== Dravidian parties in central government ==
Although the DMK and the AIADMK started playing a minimal role in the decision-making process in the Central government in the late 1960s, their actual participation in coalition governments came only in 1979, when two AIADMK Members of Parliament, Sathiavani Muthu and A. Bala Pajanor, joined the short-lived Chaudhary Charan Singh Ministry, which followed the Morarji Desai-led Janata Party government (1977–79). The DMK's Murasoli Maran joined the V. P. Singh Ministry in 1989. The DMK shared power with the subsequent United Front governments led by H. D. Deve Gowda and I. K. Gujral. In the Atal Bihari Vajpayee Ministry (1998–99), three parties from Tamil Nadu, the AIADMK, the Marumalarchi Dravida Munnetra Kazhagam (MDMK) were represented. In the BJP-led National Democratic Alliance (NDA) Ministry, headed by Vajpayee (1999–2004), the DMK, the MDMK and the PMK all had representatives. In fact, it was in this Ministry that Tamil Nadu had the largest representation. At one stage there were 10 Ministers from Tamil Nadu, seven of them from the Dravidian parties. In the Vajpayee Ministry (1998–99), the AIADMK's presence lasted only a few months. The Manmohan Singh-led central government included cabinet members from DMK.

== Ideology ==
=== Dravidianism and Tamilism ===
The principal ideals and goals of Dravidian parties at their incipience, which were borrowed from Dravidar Kazhagam, were social reforms such as ending religious beliefs, ending caste distinction, empowerment of women, ending Brahmin dominance in Tamil Nadu educational institutions and government, ending northern domination of the politics and economy of Tamil Nadu, opposition to Hindi as India's official language, and independence for Dravida Nadu from India. The call for Dravida Nadu in the initial days during the British Raj meant a "Dravidian state under the British Raj". Although Annadurai defended his party's demand for Dravida Nadu in his maiden speech in the Rajya Sabha in 1962 and recorded his protest against a ban on demanding separation, a year later the demand had to be abandoned following the Sino-Indian War. This paradigm shift is often attributed to the Sixteenth Amendment to the Indian Constitution or Anti-sectionist amendment, as it is usually called. In the 1960s, the formation of Tamil Nadu as a Tamil language state carved out of the erstwhile Madras Presidency fulfilled the goal of an encompassing Dravidian state.

Since then, state autonomy and social justice through reservation for the underprivileged in education and employment have been the main political planks of the DMK.

The Dravidian political ideology has evolved through the years and is now varied between parties.

Starting from an initial atheistic inclination with the strict anti-Brahmin outlook of the DK, the DMK moved on to a strong ethnic identity – initially that of "the Dravidian" and later of "the Tamilian" or "the common Tamil man". In fact it is considered that Dravidian politics developed into an inclusive Tamil nationalism since it associated the Dravidian community with the non-Sanskritic Tamil language and cultural tradition.

The AIADMK however, never adopted the anti-Brahminism of the DK and DMK and did not have a strict ideology. After MGR's death, the dispute over whom should head the AIADMK was led by Janaki and Jayalalithaa, who were both Brahmins. The latter headed the AIADMK and served as the Chief Minister of Tamil Nadu for multiple terms. The party's position on issues such as reservation, Hindi, federalism, Sri Lankan Tamils etc. is common with that of the other Dravidian parties.

=== Leftist inclination ===
The Self-respect movement, which is at the root of Dravidian politics, was initially forged in the mid-1920s in emulation and in critique of the Gandhian Congress Party, but by the 1930s it was heavily influenced by Leninist socialism, atheism and Bertrand Russell's inspired rationalism. C. N. Annadurai, the first Chief Minister of Tamil Nadu from the Dravidian parties, declared that the DMK (and hence its offshoots) are "genuinely communist by principle". MGR's AIADMK adopted Annaism, a political philosophy which in MGR's own words, was "a proper amalgam of capitalism, socialism and communism".

== Political use of media ==
=== Newspaper ===
Mass media have been widely used by Dravidian politicians from the early days of the parties. Initially propaganda was spread through newspapers owned by benefactors or by the organisations themselves and through public gatherings. One early example of media use was the magazine Justice, which carried strong non-Brahmin viewpoints, after which the Indian Justice Party was named. A later example is Kudi Arasu (The Republic in English). DMK had Murasoli (Drum Beat in English) as its party organ, and Similarly, from 1988 to 2017 AIADMK published Namadhu Dr. M.G.R. (Our Dr. M.G.R. in English). Currently, it uses Namadhu Puratchi Thalaivi Amma (Our Revolutionary Leader Mother in English) for its propaganda. Dinakaran, a Tamil Daily owned by Marans, was earlier considered as an unofficial organ of DMK until the family feud within the family of Karunanidhi.

=== Tamil cinema and politics ===
Tamil cinema first became politicized during the Non-cooperation movement. With the advent of sound in films, large numbers of theater personnel were attracted, many of whom were already active in politics. Annadurai was a writer, director, and producer of many films that were used as a means of propagation of Dravidian ideologies.

Sivaji Ganesan was a member of DK but later moved to DMK as one of its founding members. Nevertheless, he was expelled from the DMK following his comments on the party being a "glamour party", a reaction which is attributed to his frustration over lack of recognition.

M. G. Ramachandran was reputedly the most famous star of any Dravidian party. Former Chief Minister of Tamil Nadu Karunanidhi has continued be active both in film script writing and politics until recent times. Former Chief Ministers of Tamil Nadu V. N. Janaki Ramachandran and J. Jayalalithaa were both film stars who paired with M.G.R. in many of his movies. Other stars within the Dravidian parties include S. S. Rajendran, K. R. Ramasamy and S. S. Chandran.

=== Television ===
DMK initially used Sun TV Network for its propaganda which eventually led to the birth of the alternate Tamil Channel Kalaignar TV. Similarly, in 1991 AIADMK earlier owned JJ TV (J. Jayalalithaa Television), which was later dissolved. It used Jaya TV From 1999 to 2017. Currently, It uses News J for its propaganda.

== Impact ==
=== Regional ===
One of the major impacts of the Dravidian parties is said to be the lack of or limited support to the Hindutva movement, which swept the Hindi heartlands of India, in Tamil Nadu. The announcement in 1990 by the then Prime Minister V.P. Singh that the Mandal Commission's recommendation to extend reservation in employment in the Union government to the Other Backward Classes would be implemented was "in accordance with the resolution to that effect, passed in the State Assembly" is claimed by DMK to be one of its achievements. Listing the benefits accruing to the State from sharing power at the centre, the DMK stated that "the presence of the DMK Minister (Murasoli Maran) in the National Front Cabinet and the resolution passed in the (Tamil Nadu) Assembly during the DMK regime (1996–2001) resulted in a Tribunal being appointed to adjudicate the Kaveri River Water Dispute in the case filed by the Thanjavur farmers in the Supreme Court". The success of the efforts of Prime Minister Vajpayee in persuading Karnataka to accept the Tribunal's Interim Award ensuring 205 tmc.ft. of Kaveri river water to Tamil Nadu has been seen as one of the benefits of the DMK's presence in the BJP-led government.

According to the DMK, the "creation" of 11 Navaratnas and 97 Mini-Ratnas companies in the public sector, (blue-chip companies which invest 30 per cent of their surplus funds in public sector mutual funds) "with administrative and financial autonomy", during the United Front government at the centre (1996–98) was because of the party's presence in the Cabinet.

Another benefit cited by DMK is the substantial profits the State has received from foreign investments since the start of the liberalisation process. According to a party statement, of the total investment of Rs.13,150,170 millions that has flowed into the country since liberalisation began, Tamil Nadu has received 1,511,870 millions, which is 11.5 per cent of the total investment in the country.

It is the DMK chief Karunanidhi who played a vital role in the then central government declaring Tamil a classical language.

=== National ===
Between 1996 and 2014, either DMK or AIADMK has been part of the central governments of India. The inclusion of DMK in the United Front government, led by I. K. Gujral, in 1997 came under crisis with the interim report of Jain Commission, which was appointed to oversee the assassination of Rajiv Gandhi, said that the then DMK government was responsible for abetting Rajiv Gandhi's murderers. In 2007 DMK chief Karunanidi sparked controversy with his remarks on Lord Rama, causing political unrest and resulting in the filing of a First Information Report against him.

=== International ===
The Dravidian parties have played a pivotal role in the past Sri Lankan civil war. M. G. Ramachandran, then AIADMK chief, is said to have donated 110 million Indian Rupees to the LTTE. It was also reported by the Jain Commission that the DMK regime was aligned with the LTTE between 1989 and 1991. S. Ramadoss, party chief of PMK, has recently called for the Central Government of India to help work towards an "early political solution in Sri Lanka." In 2007 DMK, AIADMK and MDMK expressed their concerns over the arrest of Tamil Malaysians following a protest.

== Electoral symbols of the Dravidian parties ==
Electoral symbol of the Dravida Munnetra Kazhagam

Electoral symbol of the All India Anna Dravida Munnetra Kazhagam

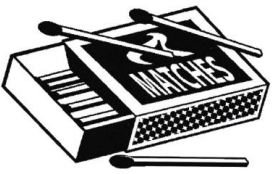
Electoral symbol of the Marumalarchi Dravida Munnetra Kazhagam

Electoral symbol of the Desiya Murpokku Dravida Kazhagam

== Flags ==
Each Dravidian party is represented by its own flag. Black and Red are the usual colours used, a feature which traces its origin to Periyar's visit to Axis countries and Soviet Russia. On his arrival back home, he declared that his party members would wear black shirts whenever and wherever possible "as a symbol of the present down-trodden condition of Dravidians". The design of the DMK flag consists of two colour rectangles, with the top half black and the bottom half red. The black color reflects the dark political, economical and social situation of Dravidians. Red is used to signify "rising sunlight" that removes the darkness. The red rises from the bottom and is expected to slowly remove all the darkness. Years later, when DMK contested elections, it would take the "rising sun" as the party symbol. AIADMK uses the black and red combination with a picture of Annadurai in white in the middle and hence it is sometimes characterised as being a tricoloured flag: black and red with white in the middle. The MDMK flag consists of two red stripes with a black stripe in the center.

Flag of DK

Flag of DMK

Flag of AIADMK

Flag of MDMK

== See also ==
- Dravidar Kazhagam
- Dravida Munnetra Kazhagam
- All India Anna Dravida Munnetra Kazhagam
- Marumalarchi Dravida Munnetra Kazhagam
- Desiya Murpokku Dravida Kazhagam
- Sri Lankan Tamil nationalism
