= Three-language formula =

Indian language learning policy

The three-language formula is a language learning policy first formulated in 1968 by the Ministry of Education of the Government of India in consultation with the states. The 1968 formula was supplanted in 2020 by the implementation of the National Education Policy 2020.

== History ==
The first recommendation for a three-language policy was made by the University Education Commission in 1948/1949, which did not find the requirement to study three languages to be an extravagance, citing the precedents of other multilingual nations such as Belgium and Switzerland. While accepting that Modern Standard Hindi was itself a minority language, and had no superiority over others such as Kannada, Telugu, Tamil, Marathi, Bengali, Punjabi, Malayalam, Assamese and Gujarati all of which had a longer history and greater body of literature, the commission still foresaw Hindi as eventually replacing English as the means by which every Indian state may participate in the Federal functions.

The Education Commission of 1964–1966 recommended a modified or graduated three-language formula. Following some debate, the original three-language formula was adopted by the India Parliament in 1968. The formula as enunciated in the 1968 National Policy Resolution which provided for the study of "Hindi, English and modern Indian language (preferably one of the southern languages) in the Hindi speaking states and Hindi, English and the Regional language in the non-Hindi speaking States". The formula was formulated in response to demands from non-Hindi speaking states of the South, such as Karnataka and mainly Tamil Nadu. The three language system was never implemented in Tamil Nadu due to efforts of former Chief Minister C. N. Annadurai, with the state using a two language policy (Tamil and English). The 1986 National Policy on Education reiterated the 1968 formula.

In 1972 the government launched a committee for promotion of Urdu under the chairmanship of I. K. Gujral. The committee's 1975 report recommended safeguards for significant (i.e. greater than 10 percent) Urdu-speaking minorities which included the use of Urdu for official purposes and as a medium of instruction. Following consideration of the report by the Cabinet in 1979, and by the Taraqqui-e-Urdu Board from 1979 to 1983, modified proposals from the Gujral committee were passed on to the state governments in 1984.

A new committee of experts was launched in 1990 under the chairmanship of Ali Sardar Jafri to examine implementation of the Gujral committee recommendations. This committee recommended modifying the three-language formula to "In Hindi speaking States: (a) Hindi (with Sanskrit as part of the composite course); (b) Urdu or any other modern Indian language and (c) English or any other modern European language. In non-Hindi speaking States: (a) the regional language; (b) Hindi; (c) Urdu or any other modern Indian language excluding (a) and (b); and (d) English or any other modern European language".

In 2020 the cabinet of Narendra Modi approved and released the "National Education Policy 2020" under the Ministry of Human Resources. The new policy emphasized that no language was made mandatory, pushing away significantly from the English-Hindi approach in 1968.

=== Evolution of Three-language formula ===
Time Period	NEP Year (Clause)	Hindi speaking states	Non-Hindi speaking states	Notes
1968–2020	1968; 3(b)	Hindi; English; modern Indian language (preferably one of the southern languages)	Regional language; Hindi; English	Implementation unsatisfactory in the Hindi states as per NEP 1986 and 1992; Not applicable in Tamil Nadu due to Official Languages Rules, 1976
2020–present	2020; 4(13)	Prescribed language formats removed; Choice of languages left to the State; Two of the three languages should be native to India		

== Criticism ==
C. N. Annadurai, the Chief Minister of Tamil Nadu during 1967–1969, opposed the requirement to learn Hindi in Tamil Nadu, "What serves to link us with the outside world is certainly capable of rendering the same service inside India as well. To plead for two link languages is like boring a smaller hole in a wall for the kitten while there is a bigger one for the cat. What suits the cat will suit the kitten as well." He was willing to adopt the formula in Tamil Nadu only on the condition that all other states of India too would adopt it.

Academics have noted the failure of the formula. Harold F. Schiffman, an expert on Dravidian culture at the University of Pennsylvania, observed that the formula "has been honored in the breach more than in reality" and that due to the lack of a national language, there is a tendency "for English to take over as the instrumental language" in India. Political scientist Brian Weinstein of Howard University said that "neither Hindi nor non-Hindi speaking states followed the (1968) directive".
