= Rani Annadurai =

Indian politician

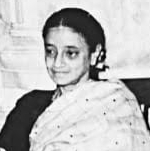

Member of the Tamil Nadu Legislative Council
- In office 1969–1974
- Chief Minister: M. Karunanidhi
- Preceded by: C. N. Annadurai

Spouse of Tamil Nadu Chief Minister
- In office 14 January 1969 – 3 February 1969
- Preceded by: position established
- Succeeded by: Dhayalu and Rajathi Ammal (Note: Visalakshi Nedunchezhiyan served for 8 days.)

Personal details
- Born: 1910
- Died: 6 May 1996 (aged 86)
- Spouse: C. N. Annadurai (m. 1930)

Rani Annadurai (1910 − 6 May 1996) was born in Thirumullaivoyal and the wife of C N Annadurai, founder of the Dravida Munnetra Kazhagam (DMK) and former Chief Minister of Tamil Nadu.

== Early life ==
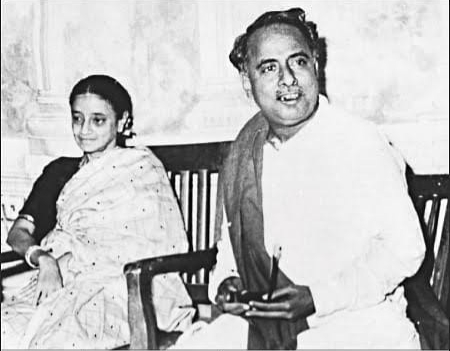

Rani married C N Annadurai in 1930, while Annadurai was a student in Pachaiyappa's College, Chennai. They had a traditional Hindu style marriage.

Rani and Annadurai did not have any children of their own. They adopted Annadurai's elder sister's children. His sister, Rajamani Ammal, lived with them and looked after their home. Rajamani Ammal had four sons, and Annadurai and his wife Rani adopted all of them.

== Public life ==
Rani was very supportive of Annadurai's work and political career. In the biography of C N Annadurai, written by Kannan R, it is mentioned that she would never disturb him while he was studying late at night, since she realised that his work was in the service of the nation. Even though she was frightened when he was arrested in 1938 for his role in the anti-Hindi agitation, she visited him frequently in jail.

When Annadurai became the Chief Minister, he found it necessary to create a home office at his residence to carry out his duties more efficiently. The government allowed him to furnish the office, and among the furniture he received was a sofa set. Rani wanted to keep the sofa set in the home and not the office room, but he did not allow her to do so – even though his office was in the same building as his home at this time.

After Annadurai's death, Rani Annadurai continued to be active in politics, for the A-DMK, DMK and also as an independent. She even contested elections for the Lok Sabha seat in Bangalore North constituency as an independent in 1977. She won 924 votes, but eventually lost to the Congress candidate.

She also took part in many cultural activities, and was honoured by the Tamil Isai Sangam in 1969.

Rani Annadurai died in Madras on 6 May 1996 at the age of 82.
