= Anna Nagar, Tiruchirappalli =

Anna Nagar is a neighbourhood in the city of Tiruchirappalli in Tamil Nadu, India. It adjoins the residential locality of Thillai Nagar.
