= E. V. K. Sampath =

Indian politician

Personal details
- Born: 5 March 1926 Erode, Tamil Nadu, British Raj
- Died: 23 February 1977 (aged 50)
- Party: Indian National Congress
- Spouse: Sulochana
- Children: E. V. K. S. Elangovan; Iniyan Sampath

Erode Venkatappa Krishnasamy Sampath (c. 5 March 1926 – 23 February 1977), usually referred to as E. V. K. Sampath was a prominent politician from Tamil Nadu, India. He was an advocate of the Dravidian Movement of Periyar E. V. Ramasamy and was considered by some as his political heir. He later split from Periyar's Dravidar Kazhagam to form Dravida Munnetra Kazhagam (DMK) along with C. N. Annadurai. In spite of being one of the founders of DMK he later left and formed his own party, by the name, Tamil National Party. Nevertheless, he later merged his party with the Indian National Congress. He is a former Member of Parliament from the constituency of Namakkal.

He belonged to a politically active family. He was nephew of Periyar and his father was an active politician himself. He is also the father of other prominent politicians of Tamil Nadu, namely, E. V. K. S. Elangovan and Iniyan Sampath and his wife Sulochana Sampath too was in active politics, holding high ranks within the Tamil Nadu government.

== Family ==
Sampath was born in the town of Erode, Madras Presidency as the son of E. V. Krishnasamy, the elder brother of Periyar E. V. Ramasamy in 1926. Krishnasamy had extended extensive support to Periyar in his struggle for self-respect and social justice, and was one of the publishers of the journal Kudiarasu (Republic), the party organ for Justice party.

In the year 1946 Sampath married Sulochana the daughter of Thirupathur G. Samy Naidu who was one of the pillars of the Justice party. Much later in life Sulochana Sampath held various high positions in the Tamil Nadu State Government including member of social welfare board, syndicate member of Annamalai University, Chairperson of Tamil Nadu Slum Clearance Board, Chairperson of Tamil Nadu Industrial Development Corporation, Chairperson of Tamil Nadu Text Book Society and Chairperson of Tamil Nadu Small Scale Industries Development Corporation. Sulochana was the organisation secretary of All India Anna Dravida Munnetra Kazhagam (AIADMK) and an AIADMK veteran for several years. She died in June 2015, aged 86.

== Entry into politics ==
He was attracted to Periyar's self-respect movement since early days of his life. The movement aimed at achieving a society where backward castes have equal human rights, and encouraging backward castes to have self-respect in the context of a caste based society that considered them to be a lower end of the hierarchy. As a student of the Intermediate Course in Pachaiyappa's College in Chennai, he participated in the programmes and agitations of DK. In the year 1944 he was declared as the Commander-in-chief of the Black Shirt Brigade of Periyar's movement.

== In DMK ==
In 1949, he along with Annadurai split from the DK and formed their own party DMK. The breakaway is attributed to the marriage of Periyar to a lady much younger. The DMK picked up the Tamil Nationalistic ideologies from its parent organisation but upheld the principles of democratic party organisation. In the inaugural function they had kept one empty chair on the head of the dais for Periyar, saying that he was their permanent leader. However, faced with the reality of an independent India setting in motion the democratic process under a new Constitution, DMK preferred to keep the separatist issue on the backburner.

== Breakaway from DMK ==
In 1961 along with Tamil poet Kannadasan and Pazha Nedumaran he found a new party Tamil National Party. The break away is variably attributed to be caused by personal difference that arose because of ascendency of M. Karunanidhi in the party and also to the differences in DMK's call for independent nation of Dravida Nadu. Sampath's ideologies varied from those of Annadurai. The latter preferred constitutional means in pursuing a Tamil state and was keen on contesting in elections for the same. Sampath found Annadurai too moderate and pressed for more radical policies, direct actions and militant methods. Moreover, Annadurai was politically inclined towards Rajagopalachari’s Swatantra Party, whereas Sampath was keen to ally with the Communist Party of India. Later one more founder members of DMK, actor Sivaji Ganesan would move to Sampath's TNP, after his feud with the DMK leadership and calling it a glamour party.

== Merger into Congress ==
In 1964 Sampath, with invitation from Kamaraj merged his party with the Congress. Sampath later started Congress journals namely Tamil Cheithi, Jayaberigai (Dailies) and Alaigal (Weekly), but incurred heavy financial losses. To ensure the victory of the Congress Parliament candidates in Tamil Nadu, Indira Gandhi entrusted the entire election responsibility in the hands of Sampath in the year 1977. Sampath was made secretary of the Tamil Nadu Congress Committee and later appointed as the vice-president of the TNCC. It was Sampath who translated the speeches made by Indira Gandhi into Tamil. Sampath donated his property, 'Jawahar Illam', at Erode, to be used as the Erode District Congress Committee headquarters. Till date the headquarters functions there. Sampath died on 23 February 1977. A road in Vepery, Chennai and a government building complex in College Road, Chennai are named after him.

== See also ==
- Dravidian parties
- Dravidian movement
- Dravida Munnetra Kazhagam
- E. V. K. S. Elangovan
- Anti-Hindi agitations
