= Tamil National Party =

Political party in Tamil Nadu, India

The Tamil National Party was a short-lived political party formed in 1961 in Tamil Nadu, India. The party finds its roots with the split in Dravidar Kazhagam after which Dravida Munnetra Kazhagam (DMK) was formed. E. V. K. Sampath, a founding member of the Dravida Munnetra Kazhagam, left the party following differences with the party leadership. The differences arose due to the DMK's stance on achieving an independent nation called Dravida Nadu. Nevertheless, within years the Tamil National Party was merged with Indian National Congress. 1995, the founder Balasubramaniam was the founder of the Coimbatore Chezhiyan as the general secretary of the party.

After the demise of Balasubramaniam in 2018, the party stepped into soil, language and ethnic politics, and Mr.Subramanian sworn in as the president, Mr.K.Tamilarasan as the General Secretary and Erode Kongu N. Ravichandran as the Deputy General Secretary from April 2025 onwards.

== E. V. K. Sampath and DMK ==
E. V. K. Sampath was nephew of Periyar E. V. Ramasamy and for a long time considered his political heir. He entered into a feud with Periyar after the latter married a woman much younger to him. Periyar soon after the marriage declared his new wife as his political heir and thus upsetting Sampath's aspirations. The marriage itself had caused opposition within the Dravidar Kazhagam, the social organisation that Periyar was heading. E. V. K. Sampath along with C. N. Annadurai broke away from Dravidar Kazhagam and formed their own party Dravida Munnetra Kazhagam.

== Differences on using movie media ==
Tamil cinema has been used extensively for propaganda for Dravidian politics. Although the Indian National Congress in the region did use movies and stars for propaganda, it was shunned upon by major Congress leaders. DMK to the contrary used the Tamil film industry as a major political organ. Thus movie stars held high ranks in the party. Sampath vehemently opposed the importance given to film stars in the party.

== Birth of Tamil National Party ==
The differences between E. V. K. Sampath and Annadurai finally gave way on their stands on Dravida Nadu. Dravida Nadu was envisaged by Periyar E. V. Ramasamy as an independent nation that included South India. Periyar and later Annadurai considered that remaining in the Union meant accepting linguistic domination of the North and backwardness of the South. Nevertheless, after touring the Soviet Union, E. V. K. Sampath opposed the call for Dravida Nadu and declared that the idea of independent Dravida Nadu was an impossible task to achieve. With this difference E. V. K. Sampath and his supporters left DMK and formed their own party. Thus Tamil National Party was born in 1961. Some of the well known members of the party included Kannadasan, M. P. Subramaniyan, Pazha Nedumaran, Vazhapadi Ramamoorthy and Sivaji Ganesan.

== Policies of the party ==
The policies of the party were:

- Autonomous National linguistic regions with the freedom to secede from the federation based on the free will of the peoples.
- Establishing a society sans inequalities by Industrialisation of Tamil Nadu.
- Eradication of superstitions, castes, religions and all atrocities against humanity to usher in a just society based on rationalism.

== Merger with Congress ==
Soon after the departure from DMK Tamil National Party members closely associated with that of the Congress party. At that time Periyar and his Dravidar Kazhagam was close with Kamaraj the leader of the Congress party. Thus when Kamaraj invited Sampath to join the Congress, Sampath merged Tamil National Party with the Congress party in 1964.
