= Thangarathinam =

- Poster
- Directed by: S. S. Rajendran
- Screenplay by: K. G. Radhamanalan
- Produced by: T. V. Narayanasamy
- Starring: S. S. Rajendran; C. R. Vijayakumari
- Cinematography: M. Karnan
- Edited by: R. Devan
- Music by: K. V. Mahadevan
- Production company: S. S. R. Pictures
- Release date: 25 November 1960
- Running time: 2 hrs. 56 mins. (15891 ft.)
- Country: India
- Language: Tamil

Thangarathinam is a 1960 Indian Tamil-language drama film directed by S. S. Rajendran starring himself and Vijayakumari.

== Plot ==
Thangam is a young man from a rich family studying in Chennai. When he goes to his village during holidays, he meets a poor girl, Rathinam and they becomes lovers. He returns to Chennai before his father Mirasudhar Nallamuthu Pillai learns of his love affair. Selvam is Thangam's friend. Two girls, Seethai and Meena are in love with Selvam, but Selvam loves Seethai. Meena is frustrated and receives a telegram that her mother is not well. When she goes to the village, her mother has already died and her father Vadivelu is unable to settle his debts. Mirasudhar Nallamuthu Pillai offers to help them and in return he weds Seetha. Thangam learns that his aged father has married a young girl. He returns home to find Seetha as his step mother. He thinks that Seetha has cheated his friend Selvam. He leaves home and gets involved in social reform activities. He works as a labourer for his living. He learns that his girl friend Rathinam and her father Veerasamy were ill-treated by his father. He consoles them and promises Veerasamy that he will marry Rathinam. Selvam comes to the village in search of Thangam. When he goes to Thangam's home, he finds Seetha there and thinks Thangam has married her. Mirasudhar attacks Selvam and chases him out. Selvam thinks Thangam has cheated him and searches for him with a knife. How these problems are settled forms the rest of the story.

== Cast ==
The following lists are compiled from the database of Film News Anandan and from the film's song book.

- S. S. Rajendran
- Vijayakumari
- K. A. Thangavelu
- M. N. Rajam
- Prem Nazir
- V. K. Ramasamy
- Nagesh
- P. Hemalatha
- Pushpamala
- Meenakshi
- V. Nagayya (cameo appearance)
- T. V. Narayanasamy
- S. S. Sivasooriyan
- P. S. Thedchanamoorthy
- K. R. Rathinam
- K. R. Seetharaman
- T. N. Krishnan
- K. G. Archunan
- K. T. Rajagopal
- S. S. Subburam
- S. A. G. Sami
- Krishnan
- Perumal Raju
- Thangappan
- Rangaraju

== Soundtrack ==
The music was composed by K. V. Mahadevan. A folk song also was included in the film.

| Song | Singer/s | Lyricist | Length |
|---|---|---|---|
| "Edhaiyum Thaangum Manasu" | T. M. Soundararajan & K. Jamuna Rani | Thanjai N. Ramaiah Dass | 03:14 |
| "Thunbam Theeraadho, Thuyaram Maaraadho" | T. M. Soundararajan & K. Jamuna Rani | S. S. Rajendran | 02:23 |
| "Jaalamellaam Theriyudhu Aahaa" | T. M. Soundararajan & K. Jamuna Rani | A. Maruthakasi | 04:45 |
| "Innoruvar Thayavedharku" | P. Susheela | A. Maruthakasi | |
| "Enakku Nee Unakku Naan" | P. Susheela | A. Maruthakasi | 02:33 |
| "Sandana Podhigaiyin Thendralenum" | C. S. Jayaraman | Kudanthai Krishnamoorthi | 03:14 |
| "Maamarathu Solaiyile" | S. S. Rajendran | Folk song | |
