= Dravida Nadu =

Dravidian separatist movement in South India

The proposed flag of Dravida Nadu

The Dravida Nadu movement was a separatist movement seeking to create a homeland for the Dravidians by establishing a sovereign state in the predominantly Dravidian-speaking southern regions of British India consisting of Andhra Pradesh, Tamil Nadu, Southern Karnataka (Mysore) and Kerala. It was started by the Justice Party under Periyar and later the Dravida Munnetra Kazhagam (DMK) led by C. N. Annadurai.

Initially, the demand of Dravida Nadu proponents was limited to Tamil-speaking regions, but it was later expanded to include other Indian states with a majority of Dravidian-speakers (Andhra Pradesh, Kerala and Karnataka). Some of the proponents also included parts of Ceylon (Sri Lanka), Orissa and Maharashtra. Other names for the proposed sovereign state included "South India", "Deccan Federation" and "Dakshinapath".

The movement for Dravida Nadu was at its height from the 1940s to 1960s, but due to fears of Tamil hegemony, it failed to find any support outside Tamil Nadu even though the largest ethnic group would have been Telugus. The States Reorganisation Act 1956, which created linguistic States, weakened the demand further. In 1960, the DMK leaders decided to withdraw their demand for a Dravida Nadu from the party programme at a meeting held in the absence of Annadurai. In 1963, the Government of India led by Jawaharlal Nehru, declared secessionism as an illegal act. As a consequence, Annadurai abandoned the "claim" for Dravida Nadu – now geographically limited to modern Tamil Nadu – completely in 1963.

== Background ==
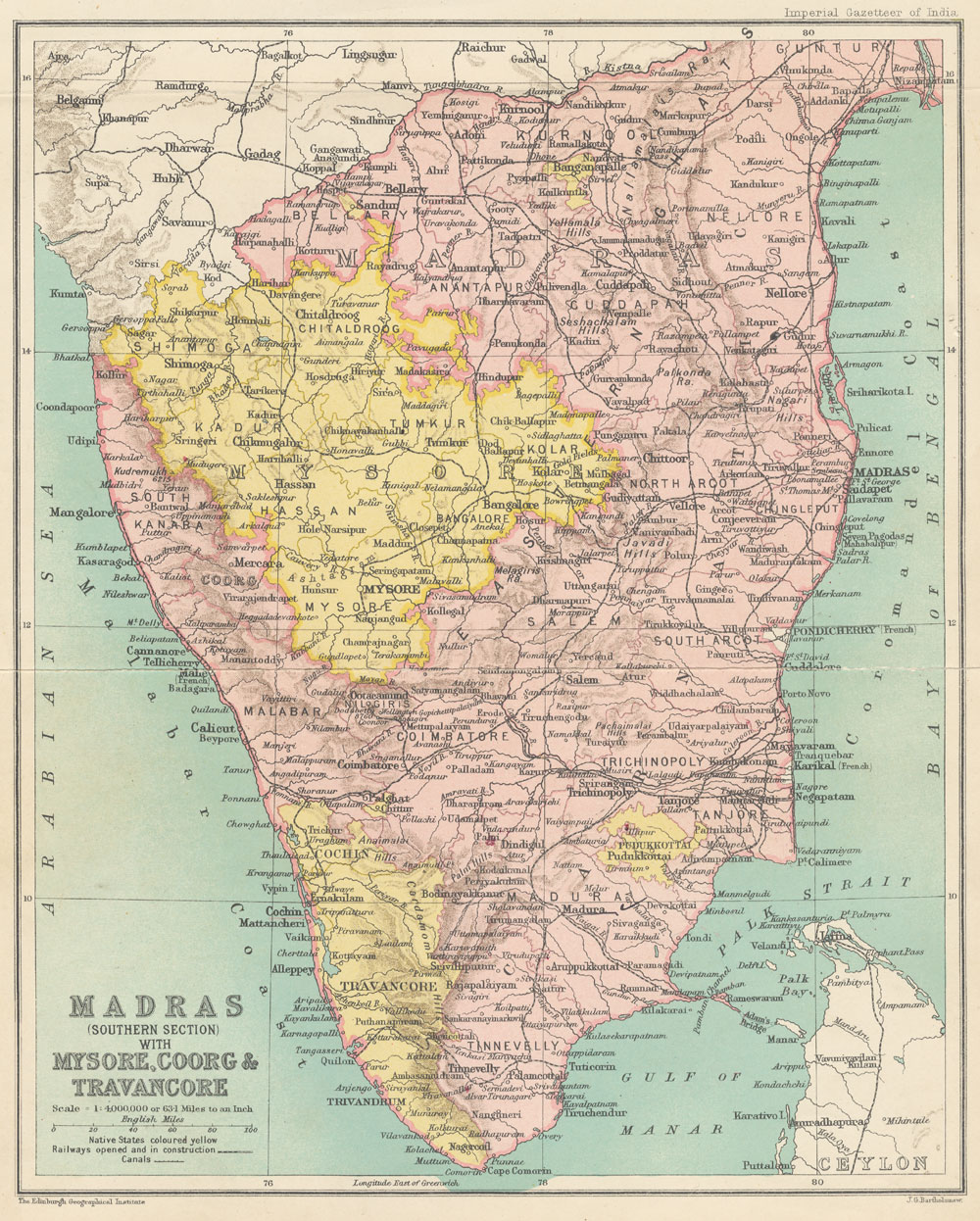
Southern portion of the Madras Presidency in 1909

The concept of Dravida Nadu had its root in the anti-Brahminism movement in Tamil Nadu, whose aim was to end the Brahmin dominance in the Tamil society and government. The early demands of this movement were social equality, and greater power, and control. However, over the time, it came to include a separatist movement, demanding a sovereign state for the Tamil people. The major political party backing this movement was the Justice Party, which came to power in the Madras Presidency in 1921.

Since the late 19th century, the anti-Brahmin Tamil leaders had stated that the non-Brahmin Tamils were the original inhabitants of the Tamil-speaking region. The Brahmins, on the other hand, were described not only as oppressors, but even as a foreign power, on par with the British colonial rulers.

The prominent Tamil leader, E. V. Ramasamy (popularly known as "Periyar") stated that the Tamil society was free of any societal divisions before the arrival of Brahmins, whom he described as "Aryan invaders". Ramasamy was an atheist, and considered the Indian nationalism as "an atavistic desire to endow the Hindu past on a more durable and contemporary basis". Ramasamy notably remarked that upon seeing a Brahmin and a snake, he would encourage people to attack the Brahmin.

The proponents of Dravida Nadu fabricated elaborate historical anthropologies to support their theory that the Dravidian-speaking areas once had a great non-Brahmin polity and civilisation, which had been destroyed by the Aryan conquest and Brahmin hegemony. This led to an idealisation of the ancient Tamil society before its contact with the "Aryan race", and led to a surge in the Tamil nationalism. Ramasamy expounded the Hindu epic Ramayana as a disguised historical account of how the Aryans subjugated the Tamils ruled by Ravana. Some of the Dravidians also posed Saivism as an indigenous, even non-Hindu religion.

The Indian National Congress, a majority of whose leaders were Brahmins, came to be identified as a Brahmin party. Ramasamy, who had joined Congress in 1919, became disillusioned with what he considered as the Brahminic leadership of the party. The link between Brahmins and Congress became a target of the growing Tamil nationalism.

In 1925, E.V. Ramasamy launched the Self-respect movement, and by 1930, he was formulating the most radical "anti-Aryanism". The rapport between the Justice Party and the Self-Respect movement of E.V. Ramasamy (who joined the party in 1935) strengthened the anti-Brahmin sentiment. In 1937–38, Hindi and Hindustani were introduced as new subjects in the schools when C. Rajagopalachari of Congress became the Chief Minister of Madras Presidency. This led to widespread protests in the Tamil-speaking region, which had a strong independent linguistic identity. Ramasamy saw the Congress imposition of Hindi in government schools as further proof of an Aryan conspiracy.

=== Characteristics and precursors ===
At the 14th Confederation of the Justice Party held in Madras in 1938, rules and regulations, or precursors of a Dravida Nadu were adopted. The objectives were defined as: to attain Purna Swaraj and complete control for Dravida Nadu in social, economic and industrial, and commercial fields; to liberate Dravida Nadu and Dravidians from exploitation and domination by aryan foreigners; to acquire for the citizens of Dravida Nadu without discrimination on account of caste and class and inequalities arising there from, in law and society, equal rights and equal opportunities; to remove from the Dravidian people the sense of difference and superstitious beliefs existing in the name of religion, customs, and traditions and unite them as a society of people with a liberal outlook and intellectual development, and to get proportionate representation in all fields till the achievement of these objectives and until the people who have a sense of caste, religious and class differences cooperate with the party in full confidence and goodwill. Thus, Ramasamy also stated that "Self Respect should come before self-rule".

The characteristics of the separate Dravida Nadu was described by E.V. Ramasamy as: the area then comprising Madras Presidency; passport system to enter the state; duty on goods from other provinces and entry with permit; demarcation of boundaries according to the needs and convenience of Dravida Nadu; and continuing an existing system of defence till grant of full independence. He also assured religious freedom to Muslims, Christians, Buddhists and others within this area. On the same accord, the separation of religion and politics was a part of this leaving religion as a matter of individual belief. It was made clear that the political movement should not be used for religious propaganda.

== Justice Party ==
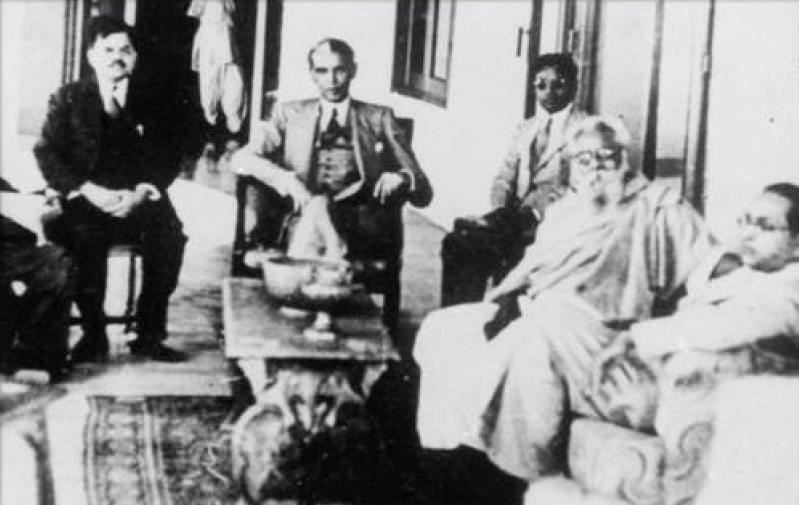
E.V. Ramasamy with Jinnah and Ambedkar. Mumbai, 6 January 1940

In December 1938, the Justice Party Convention passed a resolution stressing Tamil people's right to a separate sovereign state, under the direct control of the Secretary of State for India in London.

In 1939, E.V. Ramasamy organised the Dravida Nadu Conference for the advocacy of a separate, sovereign and federal republic of Dravida Nadu. In a speech on 17 December 1939, he raised the slogan "Dravida Nadu for Dravidians", which replaced the earlier slogan "Tamil Nadu for Tamils". In 1940, the South Indian Liberal Federation (Justice Party) passed a resolution demanding a sovereign state of Dravida Nadu.

E.V. Ramasamy was clear about the concept of a separate multi-linguistic nation, comprising Tamil, Telugu, Malayalam and Kannada areas, that is roughly corresponding to the then existing Madras Presidency with adjoining areas into a federation guaranteeing protection of minorities, including religious, linguistic, and cultural freedom of the people.

The proposition was made with a view to safeguarding the national self-respect of Dravidians threatened by Indo-Aryan culture, language, political leadership, and business interests. A separatist conference was held in June 1940 at Kanchipuram when Ramasamy released the map of the proposed Dravida Nadu. With the promised grant of full self-government after World War II, and posed another threat to the Indian Freedom Movement However, it failed to get British approval. On the contrary, Ramasamy received sympathy and support from people such as Bhimrao Ramji Ambedkar and Muhammad Ali Jinnah for his views on the Congress, and for his opposition to Hindi. They then decided to convene a movement to resist the Congress. By the 1940s, E.V. Ramasamy supported Muslim League's claim for a separate Pakistan, and expected its support in return.

In an interview with the Governor of Madras, Jinnah, the main leader of Muslim League, said that India should be divided into four regions: Dravidistan, Hindustan, Bangalistan and Pakistan; Dravidistan would approximately consist of the area under the Madras Presidency. Jinnah stated "I have every sympathy and shall do all to help, and you establish Dravidistan where the 7 per cent Muslim population will stretch its hands of friendship and live with you on lines of security, justice and fairplay."

In July 1940, a secession committee was formed at the Dravida Nadu Secession Conference held in Kanchipuram. On 24 August 1940, the Tiruvarur Provincial Conference resolved that Dravida Nadu should be an independent state (thani-naadu). The proponents of Dravida Nadu also sought to associate and amalgamate Tamil Islam within a supposedly more ancient Dravidian religion, which threatened the Islamic identity of Tamil Muslims, some of whom had earlier supported the demand for a sovereign Dravida Nadu movement.

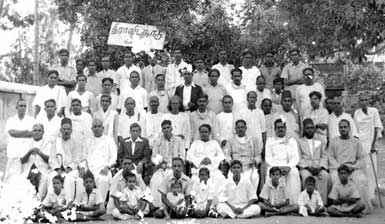
Dravida Nadu – Tamil magazine founded in 1942 by C. N. Annadurai

In August 1941, E.V. Ramasamy declared that the agitation for Dravida Nadu was being temporarily stopped. The reason cited was that it was necessary to help the government in its war efforts. The agitation would be renewed after the conclusion of the war. Even though the agitation for Dravida Nadu was being stopped, the demand was very much intact. When the Cripps Mission visited India, a delegation of the Justice Party, comprising E.V. Ramasamy, W. P. A. Soundarapandian Nadar, Samiappa Mudaliar and Muthiah Chettiar, met the members of the Cripps Mission on 30 March 1942, and placed before them the demand for a separate Dravidian nation. The demand was rebuffed by Cripps, who told them that such a demand would be possible only through a resolution in the Madras legislature or through a general referendum.

In August 1944, E.V. Ramasamy created a new party called Dravidar Kazhagam out of the Justice Party, at the Salem Provincial Conference. The creation of a separate non-Brahmin Dravidian nation was a central aim of the party. In 1944, when E.V. Ramasamy met the Dalit leader B. R. Ambedkar to discuss join initiatives, Ambedkar stated that the idea of Dravidistan was applicable to entire India, since "Brahminism" was "a problem for the entire subcontinent".

At the Dravidar Kazhagam State Conference in Tiruchi in the 1940s, prominent Tamil leader C. N. Annadurai stated that it was necessary to divide India racially to prevent "violent revolutions" in future, that according to him, had been prevented due to the British occupation of India.

On 1 July 1947, the separatist Tamil leaders celebrated the "Dravida Nadu Secession Day". On 13 July 1947, they passed a resolution in Tiruchirapalli demanding an independent Dravida Nadu. On 16 July, Mahatma Gandhi expressed his opposition to the demand. Also in 1947, Jinnah refused to help E.V. Ramasamy to help create a Dravidastan.

When India achieved Independence in August 1947, Ramasamy saw it as a sad event that marked the transfer of power to "Aryans", while Annadurai considered as a step towards an independent Dravida Nadu, and celebrated it. Over the time, disputes arose between the two leaders. They fell out after Ramasamy anointed his young wife as his successor to lead the party, superseding senior party leaders.

== Dravida Munnetra Kazhagam ==
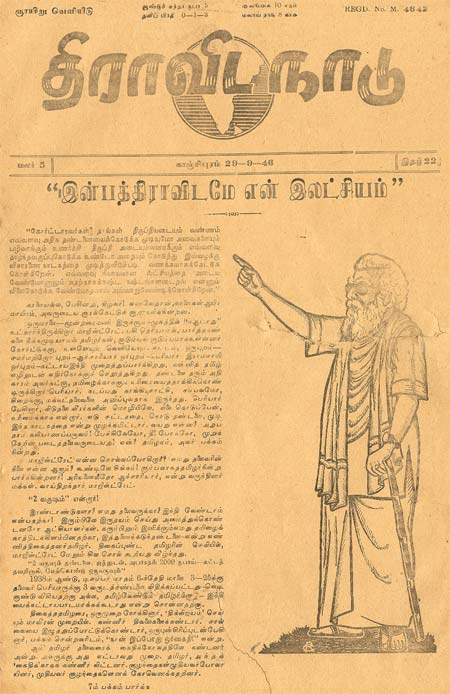
Front page of the Dravida Nadu magazine dated 29 September 1946. It depicts Ramasamy E. V. Ramasamy and his speech in the court during the Anti-Hindi Agitations of 1937–40

In 1949, Annadurai and other leaders split up and established Dravida Munnetra Kazhagam. Annadurai was initially more radical than Ramasamy in his demand for a separate Dravida Nadu. In highlighting the demand for Dravida Nadu, the economics of exploitation by the Hindi-speaking, Aryan, Brahminical North was elaborated upon. It was contended that Dravida Nadu had been transformed into a virtual marketplace for north Indian products. And, thus, Annadurai explained that to change this situation, a separate Dravida Nadu must be demanded. Throughout the 1940s, E.V. Ramasamy spoke along the lines of a trifurcation of India, that is dividing the existing geographical region into Dravida Nadu, Muslim India (Pakistan), and Aryan Land (Hindustan). In public meetings that he addressed between March and June 1940, he projected the three-nation doctrine as the only solution which could end the political impasse in the country.

In 1950, E.V. Ramasamy stated that Dravida Nadu, if it comes into being, will be a friendly and helpful state to India. When the political power in Tamil Nadu shifted to the non-Brahmin K. Kamaraj in the 1950s, EVR's DK supported the Congress ministry. In the late 1950s and early 1960s, the Dravida Nadu proponents changed their demand for an independent Dravida Nadu to an independent Tamil Nadu, as they did not receive any support from the non-Tamil Dravidian-speaking states. Ramasamy changed the banner in his magazine Viduthalai from "Dravida Nadu for Dravidians" to "Tamil Nadu for Tamils".

The reorganisation of the Indian states along linguistic lines through the States Reorganisation Act of 1956 weakened the separatist movement. In June–July 1956, the founder of Kazhagam, E. V. Ramaswamy, declared that he had given up the goal of Dravidistan.

However, by this time, DMK had taken over from DK as the main bearer of the separatist theme. Unlike Khalistan and other separatist movements in Republic of India, DMK never considered violence as a serious option to achieve a separate Dravida Nadu.

While Periyar's idea of Dravida Nadu was vague and ambiguous, C.N. Annadurai clearly defined Dravida Nadu as the federation of four autonomous self-governing linguistic states (Tamil, Kannada, Telugu, Malayalam) who will also have the freedom to secede in the future as another separate nation if the federation doesn't work. Annadurai held that Dravidians were divided by linguistic ethnicities (rightfully so) but united by race, thus belonging to the same stock.

DMK's slogan of Dravida Nadu found no support in any state of India other than Tamil Nadu. The non-Tamil Dravidian speakers perceived the ambitions of the Tamil politicians as hegemonic, ultimately leading to the failure of the Dravida Nadu concept. C. Rajagopalachari, the former Chief Minister of Madras State and a Tamil Brahmin, stated that the DMK plea for Dravida Nadu should not be taken seriously.

== Decline ==
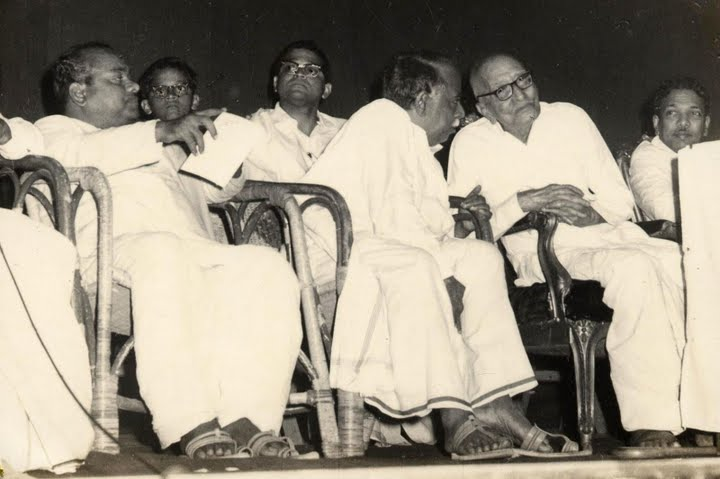
DMK leaders K. A. Mathialagan, V. P. Raman, C. N. Annadurai and M. Karunanidhi with Rajaji

The decline in support for the Dravida Nadu within the DMK can be traced back to as early as the Tiruchi party conference in 1956, when the party decided to compete in the Tamil Nadu state assembly elections of 1957. E.V.K. Sampath, who was leading a faction within DMK, argued that Dravida Nadu was "not feasible". However, the party did state Dravida Nadu as a "long-range goal" during the elections. The political observers doubted the seriousness of their demand for a sovereign state, and stated that the demand for a separate Dravida Nadu was just a side issue, and a slogan to catch the imagination of an emotional public. In the 1957 elections, DMK managed to win only 15 of the 205 seats in the state assembly.

In 1958, V. P. Raman, a Brahmin leader, joined the party and became a strong opponent of the Dravida Nadu concept. In November 1960, the DMK leaders, including Raman, decided to delete the demand of Dravida Nadu from the party programme at a meeting held in absence of Annadurai. Political scientist Sten Widmalm writes, "It seems that the more the party distanced itself from the demand for Dravida Nadu, the more it was supported." In the 1962 election, DMK more than tripled its seats, winning 50 seats to the State Legislative Assembly, but still could not displace the Congress from power.

On 17 September 1960, a "Dravida Nadu Separation Day" was observed, which resulted in arrests of Annadurai and his associates. The demand for a sovereign Tamil state was considered as a threat of Balkanization to India, and also raised concerns among the Sinhalese politicians in Sri Lanka. In 1962, a Sinhalese M.P. stated in the Parliament: "The Sinhalese are the minority in Dravidistan. We are carrying on a struggle for our national existence against the Dravidistan majority."

Annadurai, who had been elected to the upper house of Indian parliament (Rajya Sabha) in 1962, reiterated DMK's demand for independence for Dravida Nadu in his maiden speech on 1 May 1962. However, at the time of Sino-Indian War of 1962, he proclaimed that his party would stand up for the integrity and unity of India. A faction of DMK contended that the party should publicly abandon the demand for Dravida Nadu.

In 1963, on the recommendation of the Committee on National Integration and Regionalism of the National Integration Council, the Indian parliament unanimously passed the Sixteenth Amendment to the Constitution, which sought to "prevent the fissiparous, secessionist tendency in the country engendered by regional and linguistic loyalties and to preserve the unity, sovereignty, and territorial integrity" of India. This was essentially in response to the separatist movement demanding a sovereign Dravidistan.

At a party conference in 1963, DMK formally dropped the secessionist demand, but also asserted that it would continue to address the issues that led it to frame its demand for separation earlier. The Sino-Indian war does not seem to be a decisive factor in dropping the demand for Dravida Nadu; prominent DMK leaders Era Sezhiyan and Murasoli Maran have stated that the demand for Dravida Nadu had been dropped in practice before 1962. Maran explained that there was not really enough support for Dravida Nadu in Tamil Nadu at the time, and it was concluded that there was no use pursuing the demand. He declared "I am Tamil first but I am also an Indian. Both can exist together provided there is space for cultural nationalism." Era Sezhiyan declared that it was impossible to continue to demand Dravida Nadu when the policy lacked support even in the Tamil-speaking areas, let alone Kannada, Telugu and Malayalam-speaking areas. Sezhiyan was a member of the committee that wrote the new party programme, which omitted the demand for Dravida Nadu. Sezhiyan stated that it was more practical to demand a higher degree of autonomy for Tamil Nadu instead.

After DMK decided to relinquish its demand for Dravida Nadu, it devoted more attention to the language issue (anti-Hindi agitations), and the 1962 election figures were almost exactly reversed in the subsequent 1967 elections. In 1962, the Congress had won the majority of seats, while DMK managed to win only 50 seats. In 1967, DMK won a clear majority of 138 seats, while Congress won only 50 seats. DMK came to power with Annadurai as the Chief Minister of Tamil Nadu.

== Resurgence ==
In the 1980s, a minor militant organisation called Tamil Nadu Liberation Army revived the demand for Dravida Nadu, when the Indian Peacekeeping Force (IPKF) was sent to Sri Lanka.

In 2017, when the Indian Ministry of Environment, Forest and Climate Change issued a notification banning the sale of cattle for slaughter, Twitter users from the Kerala state (where beef dishes are popular) protested by trending the hashtag #DravidaNadu. The hashtag also received support from Twitter users in Tamil Nadu. The major national political parties refused to support secessionist sentiments. Several heads of South Indian states and politicians expressed dismay over the Union Government's arrangements of tax revenue distribution to various states. Dravida Munnetra Kazhagam leader and former Tamil Nadu Chief Minister M. K. Stalin expressed his support for a sovereign Dravida Nadu state, should all the other South Indian states ever share the same notion.
