= Anti-Brahminism =

Opposition to Brahminism

Anti-Brahminism is a term used in opposition to Brahminism, the caste based hierarchal social order which places Brahmins at its highest position. (Note: Bhargava (2019): "Anyone who consents to, endorses or justifies this hierarchical order, regardless of his caste, creed or gender, is then a ‘Brahmanist’.") Initial expressions of Anti-Brahminism emerged from instances of pre-colonial opposition to the caste system in India, ideological influences during the colonial period, and from a colonialist Protestant Christian understanding of religion in the 19th century, which viewed "Brahminism" as a corrupted religion imposed on the Indian population.

Ambedkar and some Hindu Reformists structured their criticism along similar lines following the 19th century criticism of "Brahminism," opposing the dominant position (Note: Dominant position: Lodrick: "It was almost inevitable, given their control of ritual sacrifice and claim to be the exclusive guardians of sacred knowledge, that Brahmans should rise to a dominant position in the life of the Hindu people [...] The modernization of India, especially in economic terms, has eroded the traditional power and prestige of the Brahmans [...] Political movements among the lower castes, such as the Dalit Panthers of Maharashtra State, often are based on a rejection of Brahmanism [...] It is perhaps no accident that a militant Hindu nationalism (Hindutva), supported in part by Brahmans, has recently emerged as a major force on the Indian political scene. The Bharatiya Janata Party (BJP) is an example of this."; Duignan: "Brahman, highest ranking of the four varnas, or social classes, in Hindu India [...] Since [the late Vedic period] there has been no fundamental change in their relative position, and the Brahmans still enjoy great prestige and many advantages, though their claim to tangible privileges is no longer officially admitted.") Brahmins had acquired by the time of British rule in the 19th century.

However, anti-Brahminism has also manifested as an anti-Brahmin sentiment, notably during the Dravidian movement and the Self-Respect Movement in the 20th century, and even in the 21st century among some followers of Periyar.

== Definitions ==
Historically, and still by some modern authors, the word "Brahminism" was used in English to refer to the Hindu religion, or that part of it following brahmin priests and their writings, as opposed to the wide range of popular cultic activity with little connection with them. In the 18th and 19th centuries, Brahminism was the most common term used in English for Hinduism, and "Hindu" meant "Indian" when applied to people. The term "Brahmanism" has also been used for Brahmanical tradition and ideology of the late Vedic period (ca.1100-500 BCE).

"Anti-Brahminism" or "Non-Brahminism" is a movement in opposition to caste based discrimination and hierarchical social order which places Brahmins at its highest position, and excludes the "untouchable" non-caste or Dalit-communities from society and power. According to Bhargava, anti-Brahminism is

...a sociopolitical ideology that encodes a memory of an ideal past and a vision of society in the future, one in which Brahmins occupy the highest place [...] their superior position in society and their superior knowledge stems from birth. This makes them naturally, intrinsically superior to all other humans [...] Brahmanism then is the most perfect form of conservatism, a status quoist ideology par excellence, entirely suitable to elites who wish to perpetuate their social status, power and privilege.

According to Sikand, Brahminism is

...the birth-based mythological, metaphysical, structural, and everyday exclusionary claims, institutions and practices of transgenerational caste power of those who self-identify as brahmins by their birth, names, markers, and other accroutments".

B. R. Ambedkar stated:

By Brahmanism, I do not mean the power, privileges and interests of Brahmins as a community. That is not the sense in which I am using the word. By Brahmanism, I mean the negation of the spirit of Liberty, Equality and Fraternity.

According to Kancha Ilaiah, referring to Ambedkar, Brahminism appears as Hindutva, Arya Dharma, Sanatana Dharma and Hinduism, and "has no organic link with Dalit-Bahujan life, world-views, rituals and even politics.

== History ==
=== Pre-Colonial times ===
According to Novetzke, initial expressions of Anti-Brahminism emerged from instances of pre-colonial opposition to the caste system, ideological influences during the colonial period.

=== 19th century colonialism ===
According to Gelders and Delders, the structure of present-day anti-Brahminism has its roots in 19th century India and colonial views on the position and influence of Brahmins. 19th century colonial rulers viewed India's culture as corrupt and degenerate, and its population irrational. In this view, derived from a Protestant Christian understanding of religion, rooted in the Protestant opposition against the Catholic Church, the original "God-given religion" was corrupted by (Catholic) priests, which was extended by comparison to the Brahmins in India, and the Brahmin-dominated type of Hinduism, for which the term "Brahminism" was used, was supposedly imposed on the Indian population.

=== 20th century ===
In the late 19th and early 20th century, with the rise of nationalist and rationalist movements, criticism against Brahminism came from both Brahmins and from low-caste Hindu communities. Ambedkar along with Hindu Reformists, structured their criticism along similar lines following the 19th century criticism of "Brahminism."

According to Beteille, in Tamil Nadu the traditional position of Brahmins had been enforced with the beginning of British rule, profiting from western education and turning to an urban lifestyle. They monopolized the new urban jobs and entered the Indian Civil Service, gaining strongholds in government and bureaucracy, and also dominated the Congress Party. This widened the gap between Brahmins and non-Brahmins, but opposition quickly mounted. Anti-Brahminism became organized with the formation of the Justice Party in late 1916 in Tamil Nadu. This party was composed of non-Brahmins (who were typically part of either the feudal castes, land-owning agricultural castes, or merchant castes) and was committed to enhancing the opportunities for non-Brahmins. With the dawn of the 20th century, and the rapid penetration of western education and western ideas, there was a rise in consciousness amongst the lower castes who felt that rights which were legitimately theirs were being denied to them. In 1920, when the Justice Party came to power, Brahmins occupied about 70 percent of the high level posts in the government. After reservation was introduced by the Justice Party, it reversed this trend, allowing non-Brahmins to rise in the government of the Madras Presidency. In the 1930s, anti-Brahmanism was disseminated among the masses by the Self-Respect Movement.

One of the most prominent proponents of Anti-Brahminism was Dalit leader B. R. Ambedkar. Another prominent proponent was Dravidian leader Periyar E. V. Ramasamy.

Periyar called on both Brahmins and non-Brahmins to shun Brahminism. However, Ramaswamy did make incendiary statements towards the encouragement of violence against the Brahmin community: "Pambaium parpanaium partha parpanai adi" — If you see a snake and a Brahmin, beat the Brahmin. Ramasamy also claimed, on several occasions, that to eliminate the caste system, driving away the Brahmins was crucial.

In October 1957, he supposedly called upon his followers to kill Brahmins and set fire to their houses. On 3 November 1957, Dravidar Kazhagam held a convention in Thanjavur under Ramasamy's leadership and demanded that the Government of India delete provisions from the Constitution dealing with religious freedom (which, they believed, gave protection to the caste system and particularly to Brahmins), and if they failed to do so the copies of the Constitution would be burnt, and portraits and statues of Mahatma Gandhi would be broken; if it produced no results, the Dravidar Kazhagam members would be asked to kill Brahmins and burn their residential localities. These statements prompted the then Prime Minister of India, Jawaharlal Nehru to write to K. Kamaraj who was the Chief Minister of Madras State (Tamil Nadu) at that time, urging him to deal with this matter without delay. The Dravidian nationalist's call to "kill Tamil Brahmins" at a 1973 speech in Karaikudi is still echoed in the 21st century by regional parties.

== See also ==
- Ambedkarism
- Self-Respect Movement
- Caste-related violence in India
- Reserved political positions in India
- Caste politics
- Reservation in India
- Śramaṇa

== Sources ==
- Ayyathurai, Gajendran (2025). Tamil Buddhism and brahminism in Modern India: Deep Resistance against Caste. Oxford University Press.
- Béteille, André (1969), Caste, Class and Power: Changing Patterns of Stratification in a Tanjore Village, University of California Press
- Bhargava, Rajeev (2019). "What does it mean to oppose Brahmanism?". The Hindu. ISSN 0971-751X.
- Clothey, Fred W. (2006), Ritualizing on the Boundaries: Continuity and Innovation in the Tamil Diaspora, Univ of South Carolina Press
- Duignan, Brian. "Brahman". Encyclopedia Britannica.
- Gelders, Raf; Delders, Willem (2003), "Mantras of Anti-Brahmanism: Colonial Experience of Indian Intellectuals", Economic and Political Weekly, 38 (43): 4611–4617, JSTOR 4414197
- Lodrick, D. O. "Brahmans". Worldmark Encyclopedia of Cultures and Daily Life. Gale.
- Novetzke, Christian Lee (23 March 2011). "The Brahmin double: the Brahminical construction of anti-Brahminism and anti-caste sentiment in the religious cultures of precolonial Maharashtra". South Asian History and Culture. 2 (2): 232–252. doi:10.1080/19472498.2011.553494. ISSN 1947-2498. S2CID 144806307.
- Omvedt, Gail (2006). Dalit Visions: The Anti-caste Movement and the Construction on an Indian Identity. Orient Longman. ISBN 978-81-250-2895-6.
- Rao, Anupama (2009). The Caste Question: Dalits and the Politics of Modern India. University of California Press. ISBN 978-0-520-25761-0.
- Sikand, Yoginder (2002). "Hindutva Is Nothing But Brahminism". Outlook, 5 April 2002.
