= Periyar (2007 film) =

- Poster
- Directed by: Gnana Rajasekaran
- Written by: Gnana Rajasekaran
- Starring: Sathyaraj; Jyothirmayi; Khushbu Sundar; Swarnamalya; Vennira Aadai Nirmala
- Cinematography: Thangar Bachan
- Edited by: B. Lenin
- Music by: Vidyasagar
- Production company: Liberty Creations Limited
- Release date: 4 May 2007
- Running time: 188 minutes
- Country: India
- Language: Tamil

Periyar is a 2007 Indian Tamil-language biographical film, written and directed by Gnana Rajasekaran, about the life of the social reformer and rationalist Periyar E. V. Ramasamy, with Sathyaraj who plays the lead role. This movie was partly funded by the then Tamil Nadu government headed by Karunanidhi. The film was dubbed in Telugu and released as Periyar Ramaswamy Naicker.

== Plot ==
The film follows Periyar right from childhood to his marriage to Nagammal to his pilgrimage to Kashi. The pilgrimage exposes him to the cruelty of the caste system, particularly after witnessing choultries that exclusively fed Brahmins, forbidding other Hindu castes. Having starved severely, Periyar found no better way than to enter a choultry by disguising himself with the appearance of a Brahmin wearing a thread on his bare chest. However, he is caught, and becomes disgusted with life in Kashi. Periyar returns and joins his father's business and later becomes the Chairman of the Erode Municipality. Later, he resigns from this post and joins the freedom struggle. He becomes the President of Madras Presidency Congress Committee and participates in the Vaikom struggle. Later, he quits the Congress party on failing to introduce reservations, and joins the Justice Party. He would go on to transform the Justice Party as Dravidar Kazhagam. His role in the Anti-Hindi agitation, his second marriage, the formation of the Dravida Munnetra Kazhagam (DMK) by his lieutenant C. N. Annadurai, until Periyar's death are the subject of the rest of the film.

== Cast ==
- Sathyaraj as Periyar E. V. Ramasamy
- Chandrasekhar as S. Ramanathan, Periyar's friend
- Jyothirmayi as Nagammai
- Khushbu Sundar as Maniammai
- Aarthi Kumar as C. Rajagopalachari ('Rajaji')
- Manorama as Chinnathayamma, Ramasamy's mother
- Kaikala Satyanarayana as Venkatappa Nayakkar, Ramasamy's father
- S. S. Stanley as C. N. Annadurai
- Mohan Ram as B. R. Ambedkar
- Vasu Vikram as M. R. Radha
- Vijay Adhiraj as K. Veeramani
- Vennira Aadai Nirmala as Moovalur Ramamirtham
- Swarnamalya as a Thanjavur Dancer
- Typist Gopu as a reporter
- Madhan Bob as a musician performing Kathakalakshepam
- Lavanya as Kannamma
- Nizhalgal Ravi as Ayyamuthu
- Ajay Rathnam as Subramaniyam
- Ilavarasu

== Production ==
Gnana Rajasekaran revealed he prompted to do Periyar due to the "enormous pressure" from audience after the success of Bharathi. It took four years for him to complete the script. The film's budget was funded by ₹95 lakh (worth ₹3.9 crore in 2021 prices) grant by Government of Tamil Nadu. The filming was held at various locations in Tamilnadu and also at Malaysia and Russia.

== Music ==
The music for the film has been scored by Vidyasagar.

No.	Title	Lyrics	Singer(s)	Length
1.	"Kadavul Ulagathai Padaichaar"	Vairamuthu	Mathu Balakirushnan, Guru Charan, Muralitharan, Surya Prakash
2.	"Idai Thazhuvi Kola Jadai"	Vairamuthu	Priya Subramaniyan
3.	"Kadavula Ni Kallaa Melor"	Vairamuthu	Manicka Vinayagam, J.K.V.Roshini, Mathu Balakirushnan, Chandran
4.	"Thai Thai Thakka Arul Seiy"	Vairamuthu	Vijayalakshmi Subramaniam
5.	"Thaayum Yaaro Thanthai Yaaro"	Vairamuthu	K. J. Yesudas

== Reception ==
Rediff wrote "Whether it is well-received or not, just as the last line of the film says, this film will hopefully help the spirit of Periyar live forever and ever". Filmy South wrote "Overall, Gnana Rajashekharan has done a commendable job in depicting a legendary leader’s life.Though there are some inadequacies in the narration the bold attempt should be appreciated and encouraged so that more such efforts would be made.". Sify wrote "Rajasekharan has done a decent job in presenting the majestic life and times of Periyar, with a brilliant performance from Sathyaraj in the title role. What makes it convincing is that the director has conveyed dramatic tension and an underlining of the humane moments in a very subtle manner".

== See also ==
- Kamaraj (film)
- Bharathi (2000 film)
