= Periyar (disambiguation) =

Periyar (E. V. Ramasamy, 1879–1973) was an Indian social reformer.

Periyar or Periyaar may also refer to:

== Places ==
- Periyar River, in Kerala, India
- Periyar district, now Erode district, in Tamil Nadu, India
- Periyar National Park, in Kerala, India
- Mullaperiyar Dam, a dam in Idukki district, Kerala, India
- Vandiperiyar, a village in Idukki district, Kerala, India

== People ==
- Periyar Dasan (1949–2013), actor from Tamil Nadu, India

== Organisations ==
- Periyar Maniammai University, in Thanjavur, Tamil Nadu, India
- Periyar University, in Salem, Tamil Nadu, India

== Media ==
- Periyar (1973 film), an Indian Malayalam-language film
- Periyar (2007 film), an Indian Tamil-language film about the social reformer

== See also ==
- Periyar Dravidar Kazhagam, a former political party in Tamil Nadu, India
