= Dravidar =

Dravidar may refer to:

- Dravidar Kazhagam, social movement in India
- Dravidar Viduthalai Kazhagam, social movement in India
- Periyar Dravidar Kazhagam, political party in India
