= Kuthoosi Gurusamy =

Tamil writer (1906-1965) associated with the Self-Respect Movement

- Born: 23 April 1906; Kuruvikkarambai, Tanjore District, Madras Presidency, British India (now Thanjavur district, Tamil Nadu, India)
- Died: 11 October 1965 (aged 59)
- Spouse: Kunjitham (m. 1929; died 1961)
- Relatives: Kuppu Ammaiyar (mother); Saminathan (father); Gandhamma (younger sister); N. D. Sundaravadivelu (brother-in-law); Saroja (niece); Poondi Kumaraswamy (nephew-in-law)
- Writing career
- Pen name: Esji

Saminathan Gurusamy (23 April 1906 – 11 October 1965), commonly known as Kuthoosi Gurusamy, was an Indian writer and journalist closely associated with the Self-Respect Movement led by Periyar E.V. Ramasamy.

== Life ==
Gurusamy was born on 23 April 1906 in Kuruvikkarambai (a village near Peravurani in present-day Thanjavur district, Tamil Nadu), to Saminathan and Kuppu Ammaiyar. He completed his undergraduate studies at National College, Trichy.

Gurusamy became involved in the Self-Respect Movement through Kudiyarasu, a magazine founded by Periyar. In 1928, after meeting Periyar, he formally joined the movement. His contributions included articles and editorials advocating rationalism, social equality, and opposition to caste-based discrimination and superstition. He later served as editor-in-chief of Viduthalai, a prominent publication associated with the movement. Gurusamy also worked with Revolt, an English magazine founded by Periyar, and contributed to Tamil publications such as Puduvai Murasu, Dravidan, and Pagutharivu, facilitating the dissemination of the movement's principles.

Gurusamy presided over the first Self-Respect Volunteers Conference held in Pattukkottai on 25 May 1929. On December 8 of the same year, he married Kunjitham, a fellow advocate of the Self-Respect Movement. The marriage became the first recorded self-respect marriage conducted without Hindu rituals. The ceremony, presided over by Periyar, marked a significant departure from traditional practices. Gurusamy also advocated ending the centuries-old practice of barring people from lower castes from entering temples.

Gurusamy's contributions to Tamil literature included translations and original works. He translated Bertrand Russell's Why I Am Not a Christian into Tamil, introducing readers to rationalist thought, and Jean Meslier's Testament as Marana Sasanam. Under the pseudonym Kuttusi, he wrote satirical columns, some of which were published as Palasarakku Moottai and Puthiya Kuthoosi Thogupu.

S. Gurusamy died on 11 October 1965.
