= Periyar and social reform =

Indian social reformer

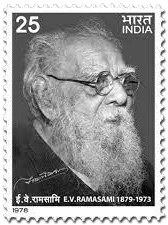
Periyar

Periyar E. V. Ramasamy (17 September 1879 – 24 December 1973), also known as Ramaswami, EVR, Thanthai Periyar, or Periyar, was a Dravidian social reformer and politician from India, who founded the Self-Respect Movement and Dravidar Kazhagam. He wanted thinking people to realize that their society was far from perfect and that it is in urgent need of reform. Periyar wanted the Government, the political parties and social workers to identify the evils in society and boldly adopt measures to remove them.

== Philosophy ==
Periyar's philosophy did not differentiate social and political service. According to him, the first duty of a government is to run the social organization efficiently, and that the philosophy of religion was to organize the social system. Conditions appeared to him such that the government was not for the people, but, in a "topsy-turvey" manner, the people were for the government. He attributed this situation to the state of the social system contrived for the advantage of a small group of people.

Therefore, Periyar was of the view that for the progress of the people in the country, great social changes were necessary and a good government could be formed only after making those changes. He thought that under the existing social system, there was and there could be no means of removing the hardships of the people even to a small extent, regardless of who came to power. In his real life he was a victim of caste discrimination.

== Rural Upliftment ==
One of the areas of focus was in the upliftment of villages. In a booklet called Village Uplift, Periyar plead for rural reform. It should be stressed in this context that rural India still forms the largest part of the Indian subcontinent in spite of the ongoing process of urbanization. Thus, the distinction between rural and urban has meant an economic and social degradation for the rural inhabitant. Periyar wanted to eradicate the concept of "village" as a discrimination word among places just as the concept outcast among social groups. Periyar advocated for a location where neither the name nor the situation or its conditions imply differences among people.

With the same aim in view, Periyar wanted farm laborers to be called "partakers in agriculture" and be paid 60 percent of the income, while 40 percent would go to the landowner. In his booklet on rural uplift of 1944, Periyar gave an action program for modernizing villages which mentioned: mechanization of agriculture, that is, ploughing, sowing, digging wells, and harvesting by machines; reformulation of agricultural land to facilitate mechanization and separation of land unsuitable for this for growing other crops; marketing of agricultural products, through farmers' cooperative so that the proceeds would go to the agriculturists; combining villages as a small town for provision of a school, hospital, park, cinema, drama, reading room, library, radio station, roads, bus transport, police station, an educated judge, and shops; organizing mobile exhibitions; establishing appeals courts and providing for field camp of officers for redressal of grievances; and establishing small industries.

Periyar and the Self-Respect Movement wanted to reduce Government salaries because they spoiled men's purity. He explained that they want industries producing things necessary for public welfare to be state-owned. Furthermore, cooperative societies should be introduced to remove the brokers and moneylenders that come between farmers and consumers. Farmers must be helped to get rid of their debts. Litigation and conflicts on account of rules should be reduced and death taxes fixed. Periyar also believed that local boards, municipalities, and cooperative managements must be given more power.

In his rural uplift, he puts every stress on education as the sure way to rational thinking and action which would lead to the abolishment of injustices in society, economic as well as social. Periyar came up with a fourteen-point program which were as follows: "the landless agriculturists should be safeguarded from exploitation by landlords and money lenders, where the government should do everything to see that agricultural workers are not deprived of their scroll land holdings for defaulting payment of rent; co-operative societies and banks should be formed to save the farmers from the exorbitant rate of interest collected by pawnbrokers and money lenders; to reduce the number of cases arising out of the dispute of the ownership of land the Government should itself possess all clear land documents; the laws pertaining to agriculture should be so framed that the actual agricultural laborers get reasonable returns for their labor, and to prevent landlords and middle-men from cornering away the bulk of the agricultural products; like railways, post and telegraphs, waterways and electricity which are now under the control of Government, the other public utilities and services should be taken over by the Government; insurance schemes should be undertaken by the Government itself and to be extended to workers as in the case of other people; legislation should be so framed as to increase the income of public as well as the workers with a view to upgrade their standard of living under income ratio; children should be given facilities for education within the target period; considering the baneful influence of toddy and other kinds of drink, the government should work towards total prohibition before a specified period of time; the evils of untouchability, discrimination based on birth, superstition and blind belief should be done away with; State Government appointments should be apportioned according to the percentage of population of people and political aspirations; land tax should be levied progressively taxing the rich more and leaving the poor from the rigorous clutches of tax; opportunities to get revenue in the case of local bodies and co-operatives should be enlarged and the management should be vested with the Government servants; and the motto of the public administration should aim at efficiency and a good administration with reasonable expenditure.

Periyar sent a copy of these resolutions to the government and political parties, including the Congress. The Congress ignored these resolutions because they had come from Periyar and his party. But the Justice Party accepted the resolutions and assured Periyar that it would implement those resolutions, when administrative power came into its hands. The acceptance of the resolutions by the Justice Party was indeed a victory for Periyar's Self-Respect Movement.
