= Viduthalai (newspaper) =

Indian Tamil newspaper

- Type: Daily newspaper
- Owner: Dravidar Kazhagam
- Editor: K. Veeramani
- Founded: 1 June 1935 (91 years ago)
- Political alignment: Dravidianism
- Language: Tamil
- Headquarters: Vepery, Chennai, Tamil Nadu, India
- Website: https://www.viduthalai.in/

Viduthalai (Tamil: விடுதலை) (transl. Liberation) is a Tamil newspaper published from Chennai, Tamil Nadu, India.

== History ==
Viduthalai was first launched on 1 June 1935, by the Justice Party as a bi-weekly, published at the address 14 Mount Road, Chennai and priced at 1/4 Indian annas. It was converted into a daily in 1937 under the charge of Periyar E. V. Ramasamy who priced it at 1/2 Indian annas. Later, the paper was published from its office at the depot of another Dravidian daily named Kudi Arasu in Erode. Later, the office was shifted to Balakrishna Pillai Street in Chintadripet, Chennai. From November 1965 onwards, Viduthalai started to be published from Vepery, Chennai.

Viduthalai also served as testing ground for Periyar's Tamil alphabet reform. During Veeramani's tenure, new formats were developed to reduce the number of letters in the உ and ஊ vowel family. These reforms were published as a separate column in the newspaper.

Viduthalai was one of the few newspapers that faced the consequences of the 1975-77 Emergency in India. It also pressed for the implementation of the 27% reservation quota as recommended by Mandal Commission.

Following the breakout of the Sri Lankan Civil War in 1983, Viduthalai advocated for the rights of Eelam Tamils who began to arrive in Tamil Nadu as refugees, while also exposing the violence perpetrated against those in Sri Lanka. The office of Viduthalai was also frequented by Tamil militants. The office enabled processions, conferences, and other pro-Eelam activities.

Following the 1992 Babri Masjid demolition, Viduthalai has shown a strong stance against Hindutva politics.

== Anniversary ==
The 85th anniversary of the newspaper was held at Periyar Thidal in Chennai on 3 June 2019. Speaking at the event, Communist Party of India (CPI) senior leader D. Pandian praised the daily's contribution in spreading the ideology of Periyar. He also requested the party to release a book on Periyar like Knowing Mandela. K Veeramani released a special issue marking the 85th year of the daily.

== Editors ==
T. A. V. Nathan (1 June 1935 - 31 December 1936)

Pt. S. Muthusamy Pillai (1 January 1937- ?)

A. Ponnambalanar (9 January 1939-?)

N. Karivaradhasamy

K.A. Mani aka. Annai E. V. R. Maniammai

K. Veeramani (21 March 1978 – present)

== Editors-in-Chief ==
C. N. Annadurai (1939- 21 December 1941)

Kuthoosi Gurusamy (20 June /12 September 1943 - 30 September 1945/ 2 January 1962)

Sami Chidambaranar

K. Veeramani

Kali Poongundran
