= Viduthalai =

Viduthalai (transl. Liberation) may refer to:

== Films ==
- Viduthalai (1954 film), a 1954 Indian Tamil-language film directed by K. Ramnoth
- Viduthalai (1986 film), a 1986 Indian Tamil-language film directed by K. Vijayan
- Viduthalai Part 1, a 2023 Indian Tamil-language film directed by Vetrimaaran
  - Viduthalai Part 2, the 2024 sequel to Viduthalai Part 1, directed by Vetrimaaran

== Other ==
- Viduthalai (newspaper), a Tamil newspaper
- Viduthalai Virumbi (born 1939), former Member of the Parliament of India representing Tamil Nadu in the Rajya Sabha (upper house); member of Dravida Munnetra Kazhagam (DMK)
- Viduthalai Rajendran (born 1947), author and General Secretary of Dravidar Viduthalai Kazhagam (DVK)
- Viduthalai Chiruthaigal Katchi (VCK) a political party in Tamil Nadu, India

== See also ==
- April 1 Vidudala, a 1991 Indian Telugu-language film directed by Vamsy
