= Thirudi =

Thirudi may refer to:

- Thirudi (1974 film)
- Thirudi (2006 film)
