= Kamaraj (film) =

2004 Indian film by A. Balakrishnan

- DVD cover
- Directed by: A. Balakrishnan
- Written by: Chembur Jayaraj, J. Francis Krupa
- Produced by: Ramana Communications Shakthi International (P.Loganathan)
- Starring: Richard Madhuram; Sambathraj Sumant; Mahendran; Vijayan
- Cinematography: M. M. Rengasamy
- Edited by: V. T. Vijayan
- Music by: Ilayaraja
- Release date: 13 February 2004
- Running time: 121 minutes
- Country: India
- Language: Tamil

Kamaraj is a 2004 Indian Tamil-language biographical film directed by Balakrishnan made about the life of the Indian politician and former chief minister K. Kamaraj from Tamil Nadu, widely acknowledged as the "Kingmaker" in Indian politics during the 1960s. He was the chief minister of Tamil Nadu during 1954-1963 and a Member of Parliament during 1952-1954 and 1969–1975.

Music was composed by Ilaiyaraaja and the film was produced by Ramana Communications and co- produced by Shakthi International (P.Loganathan). The film had a theatrical release across India in February 2004.

== Plot ==
The narration is divided into four phases. The pre-Independence period, depicting Kamaraj's childhood, the influence of Satyamurthy, Kamaraj's growth as a politician and his prison life.

The second phase depicts his taking over as the Congress Chief Minister of the state, the reforms he tries to bring in, especially in education, his largesse and his bending the rules for a good cause-like for the urgent eye-operation of a kid. It also displayed his sense of humour (like his response when his mother in the village sends word that she needed a fan and a blanket), his refusal to take advantage of his position (asking for the newly installed tap to be removed from his village-house).

The third phase where he puts forth the Kamaraj Plan, resigns from the post of CM, involves himself in party work; his influence on national politics, his emergence as a kingmaker and finally his disillusionment with the emerging non-ethics in political life.

The closing scene (taken from the record files of the actual funeral), show swarms of humanity mourning the death of their beloved leader.

== Cast ==
- Richard Madhuram as K. Kamaraj (Voice dubbed by M. S. Baskar)
- Sambathraj Sumant as young Kamaraj
- Mahendran as Minister K. Rajaram
- Vijayan as Kamaraj's friend
- V. S. Raghavan
- A. K. Veerasamy
- Kovai Ramaswamy
- S. Sathyendra
- Rajesh
- Anandi Dhalwani as Prime Minister Indira Gandhi
- Vijayakumar as Periyar E. V. Ramasamy
- Rangammal as Sivakami Ammal
- Charuhasan

== Production ==
Balakrishnan had previously made a television serial on K. Kamaraj and wanted to make a feature-length film on the politician. Richard Madhuram, a retired duty manager (Indian Airlines), was selected for the film after Charuhasan had spotted him and recommended him to the director as a lookalike of the political leader in 1995. After pre-production, the film was launched on 23 August 2002 with several politicians in attendance at the launch event. M. S. Bhaskar has lent his voice for Richard Madhuram in the film. The film was shot in 20 days on a budget of Rs 50 lakh.

== Release ==
The film gained positive reviews prior to release, with a critic from Sify.com noting that it was a "class act" and that "Balakrishnan has been faithful to the subject and has come out with a mature form of cinema." Visual Dasan of Kalki praised Balakrishnan for portraying Kamaraj's life with realism without adding any cinematic elements. Malini Mannath of Chennai Online wrote "Though it’s naturally impossible to cover the entire life-time of a legend in a capsule lasting about two hours, the director should be commended for his sincere attempt to bring to celluloid the life of a great politician and to tell the new generation of Kamaraj’s greatness and simplicity". The film was released across Tamil Nadu in February 2004, but took a low key opening at the box office. A year after release, the makers chose to dub the film into English and release it in 2007 as Kingmaker in attempt to increase financial gains from the project.

In 2013, Balakrishnan revealed that the film would have a re-release with fifteen extra scenes edited into the film. Richard Madhuram's death in 2005 meant that his son Pradeep Madhuram essayed scenes which needed the protagonist while Vijayakumar was featured as Periyar. Scenes were later digitalised and extra portions featuring actor Samuthirakani were filmed in June 2014. The updated version of the film was re-released in July 2015.

== Soundtrack ==
The film featured five songs composed by Ilaiyaraaja. Song lyrics were by Mahakavi Subramania Bharati, Vaali and Ilaiyaraaja.

- "Naadu Paarthathunda" - Tippu, Ganga
- "Oorukku Uzhaithavane" - Ilayaraja
- "Senthamil Naadenum" - Tippu, Ganga - (Lyrics: Subramania Bharati)
- "Kamaraj Speech"

== See also ==
- Bharathi (2000 film)
- Periyar (2007 film)
