= N. D. Sundaravadivelu =

Ex Vice Chancellor of University of Madras, India

Padma Shri N. D. Sundaravadivelu
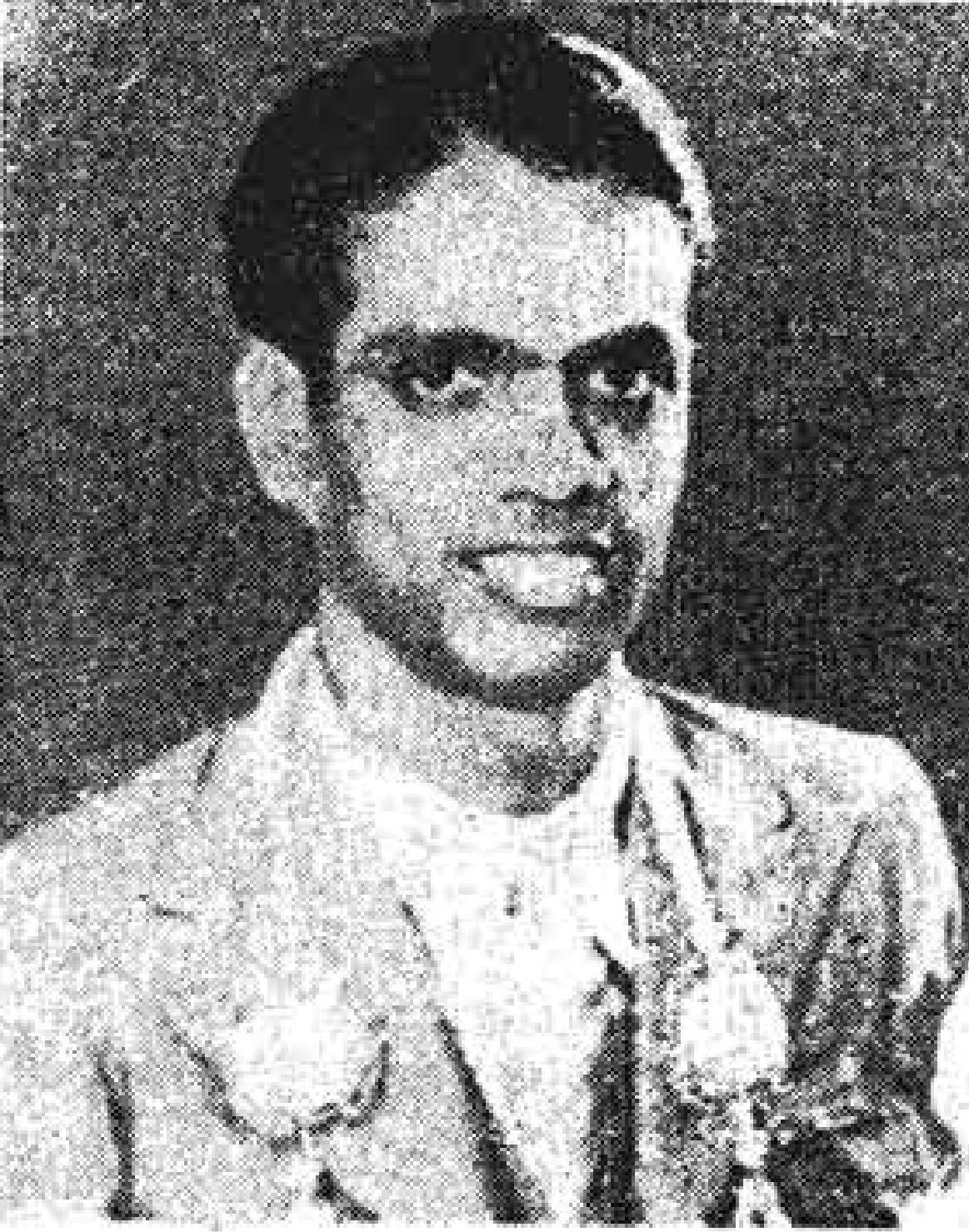

Vice Chancellor University of Madras
- In office 1969–1975
- Chancellor: Ujjal Singh (1969–71); K. K. Shah (1971–76)
- Preceded by: A. Lakshmanaswami Mudaliar
- Succeeded by: Malcolm Adiseshiah

Personal details
- Born: 12 October 1912 Neyyadupakkam, Madras Presidency, British India (now Tamil Nadu, India)
- Died: 12 April 1993 (aged 80) Madras (now Chennai), Tamil Nadu, India
- Spouse: Kanthamma (m. 1940)
- Relations: Kuthoosi Gurusamy (brother-in-law); Poondi Kumaraswamy (nephew-in-law / son-in-law)
- Children: K.S. Thiruvalluvan (1949–59)
- Parent(s): Saradhambal (mother); Duraiswamy (father)

Neyyadupakkam Duraiswamy Sundaravadivelu (12 October 1912– 12 April 1993), known as N. D. Sundaravadivelu, from a Kondaikatti Vellalar family, was an Indian academic who served as the Vice Chancellor of the University of Madras, Tamil Nadu, from 1969 to 1975, serving for two terms.

== Birth ==
Sundaravadivelu was born on 12 October 1912 to Saradhambal and Duraiswamy in Neyyadupakkam, a village in present-day Kanchipuram district, Tamil Nadu, India.

== Legacy ==
Earlier he served as educational adviser to the government of Tamil Nadu and was Director of Public Instruction for several decades. He was the main architect of the midday meal scheme for schoolchildren introduced during K. Kamaraj's chief ministership. He brought in an "educational revolution" in Tamil Nadu for which he was awarded the Padma Shri by the Government of India.

== Personal life ==
On 15 October 1940, Sundaravadivelu married Kanthamma (younger sister of Dravidian movement writer Kuthoosi Gurusamy). The couple had a son named Thiruvalluvan (December 1949 - December 1959).

== Death ==
He died on 12 April 1993 in Madras (now Chennai).
