= B. S. A. Swamy =

Indian former social activist

- Born: Bokka Sri Achuthananda Swamy; July 11, 1942; Mukteshwaram, East Godavari district, Andhra Pradesh
- Died: July 24, 2008 (aged 66)
- Occupation: social activist

Bokka Sri Atchuthananda Swamy (11 July 1942 – 24 July 2008), well known as B.S.A. Swamy, was an Indian judge and social justice activist who advocated for uplifting the downtrodden sections of Andhra Pradesh, particularly Backward Classes, Scheduled Castes and Scheduled Tribes through reservations in politics, judiciary, jobs and education.

Swamy was a judge of Andhra Pradesh High Court between 1995 and 2004. He founded the Andhra Pradesh Backward Castes, Scheduled Castes, and Scheduled Tribes Advocates Association, and was instrumental in implementing rule of reservation in appointment of Law Officers in Andhra Pradesh.

He was also the editor of Mana Patrika magazine, and through this he spread the importance of social justice and reservations for backward castes, scheduled castes, and scheduled tribes of Andhra Pradesh. To spread the message of social justice, and the importance of reservations in education, politics and judiciary he procured a specific vehicle and toured the entire Andhra Pradesh state to reach the weaker sections of the society.

He was also the founder of B.R.M. Memorial Education Society in memory of his father B. Rama Murthy (B.R.M) to give opportunities for poor and weaker sections of the society for getting educated.

He was a disciple of Gouthu Latchanna, an Indian freedom fighter who also fought for the upliftment of oppressed and weaker sections of society, and involved with the establishment of the Gouthu Latchanna Organization for Weaker Sections (GLOW). He was also influenced by Narayana Guru, Periyar, Kanshi Ram, Mahatma Jyotirao Phule, and B. R. Ambedkar which led to the launch of Mahatma Jyotirao Phule Institute for Social Justice. Though they were rationalists and were not closely associated with Hindu religion, Swamy remained and worked within the boundaries of Hindu religion until he died.

== Personal details ==
Swamy was born on 11 July 1942 at Mukteshwaram village of the Ainavalli Mandal in East Godavari, Andhra Pradesh, India.

He did his Bachelor of Science (BSc) from S.K.B.R college at Amalapuram and Bachelor of Law (B.L) from Andhra University at Waltair.

He died of a heart attack at Nizam institute of Medical Sciences on 24 July 2008, having earlier undergone heart bypass surgery.

== Career summary ==
- After finishing his law degree in 1976 at Hyderabad, Andhra Pradesh, he served under a former chief justice of Andhra Pradesh High Court, Alladi Kuppu Swamy. He later worked in the chambers of P. Shiv Shanker (former judge of the High Court of Andhra Pradesh and also the governor and union minister of India).
- He began independent practice in the high court in 1974, involving himself in a wide range of legal issues.
- Founder and President of Andhra Pradesh Young Advocates Association between 1970 and 1975, and instrumental in improving their working conditions in the profession.
- Member of Andhra Pradesh High Court Legal Aid Committee since August 1992.
- Judge of Andhra Pradesh High Court from 2 May 1995 to 11 July 2004.
- General secretary of Bahujan Samaj Party political party in 1990 influenced by Kanshi Ram and B. R. Ambedkar. Later on, he kept himself away from active politics and started Mahatma Jyotirao Phule Institute for Social Justice to move forward as social justice activist to seek and strive for the empowerment of the poor and the weak belonging to backward castes, scheduled castes, and scheduled tribes.
- Advisor of the National Union of Backward Classes.
- Member of Weaker Sections empowerment forum.

After he retired as High Court judge in 2004, he was a frequent participant and speaker at various seminars or protestations related to social justice and reservations.

In 2008 Swamy asked that there be a greater representation in the Indian legal system. He said that

We want statutory and mandatory provisions to give reservation to the unrepresented classes. The present scenario is such that the judicial system is working like a family tree. It is like a dynasty where the judges appoint the other employees of the court of the same upper class. Hierarchy has been built up not only for judges but in their ministerial services too.

He was a member of a people's court jury which found George W. Bush, President of the United States of America, guilty in perpetrating terrorism in the name of fighting terrorism and attacking and threatening other countries using the issue of nuclear weapons as a pretext and resorting to human rights violation and large-scale killings of people, including women and children, especially in Afghanistan and Iraq and creating a sense of insecurity in the world. Other members of the jury included human rights activists namely Professor Hargopal and Rama Melote.

He was an active speaker and member of Joint Action Committee for Backward Castes in Andhra Pradesh which demands for 50% reservation for backward castes in the coming elections for Legislative Assembly of Andhra Pradesh and members of Parliament of India.

He expressed concerns in discriminating Scheduled Castes in law by denying equal rights to them in law.

He opposed the deliberate inclusion of the Kapu caste in backward castes by the state government. He criticised the action, quoting "Constituent Assembly had made it clear that economic backwardness was not the only criteria [sic] to consider castes as backward castes. The caste groups should be identified by trades to qualify as backward castes. The principle of shudras and non-shudras should form the basis of dividing the castes". He believed that castes should be recognised as backward castes based on parameters such as poor hygiene, adherence to superstitious beliefs, lack of education, and isolation from village communities.

He complained when a person whom he considered to be inappropriate was appointed as a Supreme Court judge.

== Awards ==
- He was conferred with K.Veeramani award for social justice instituted by Periyar International(USA) for propagating the message of social justice tirelessly throughout his career.
- He was also conferred with the Kalaimamani award by the state government of Tamil Nadu for his efforts in upliftment of the weaker sections of society through social justice and awareness programmes.
