= A. R. Akela =

Indian author, poet, folk singer and publisher

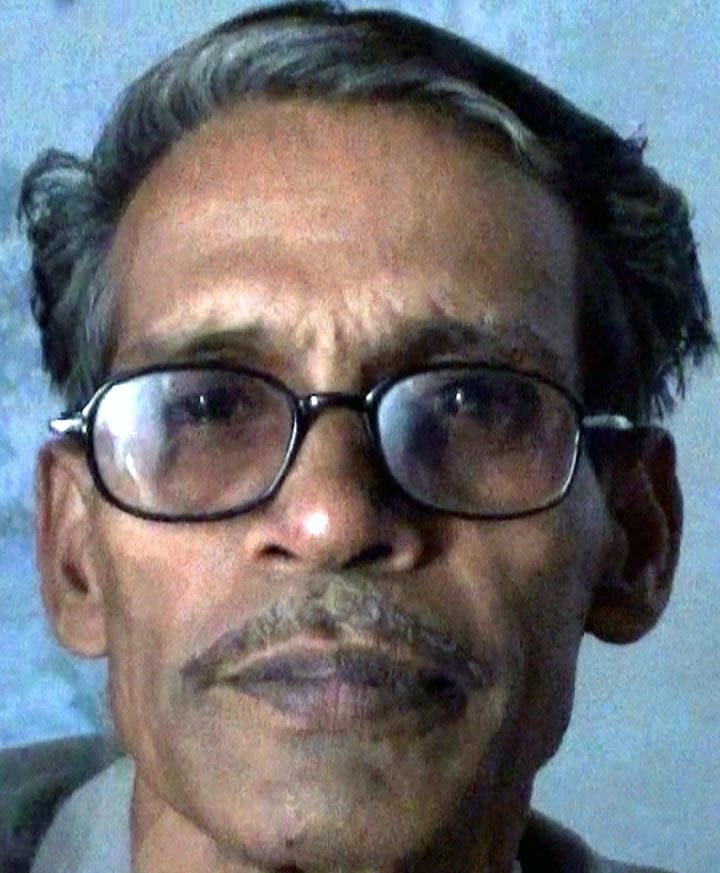
- Born: 30 September 1960 (age 66); Aligarh, Uttar Pradesh, India
- Occupation: Writer
- Years active: 1980 – present

Anant Rao Akela (born 30 September 1960) is an Indian Dalit author, poet, folk singer and publisher.

== Publication ==
Akela owns the publishing business Anand Sahitya Sadan.

== See also ==
- Dalit literature
- Lalai Singh Yadav
