= Viduthalai Rajendran =

K. Rajendran
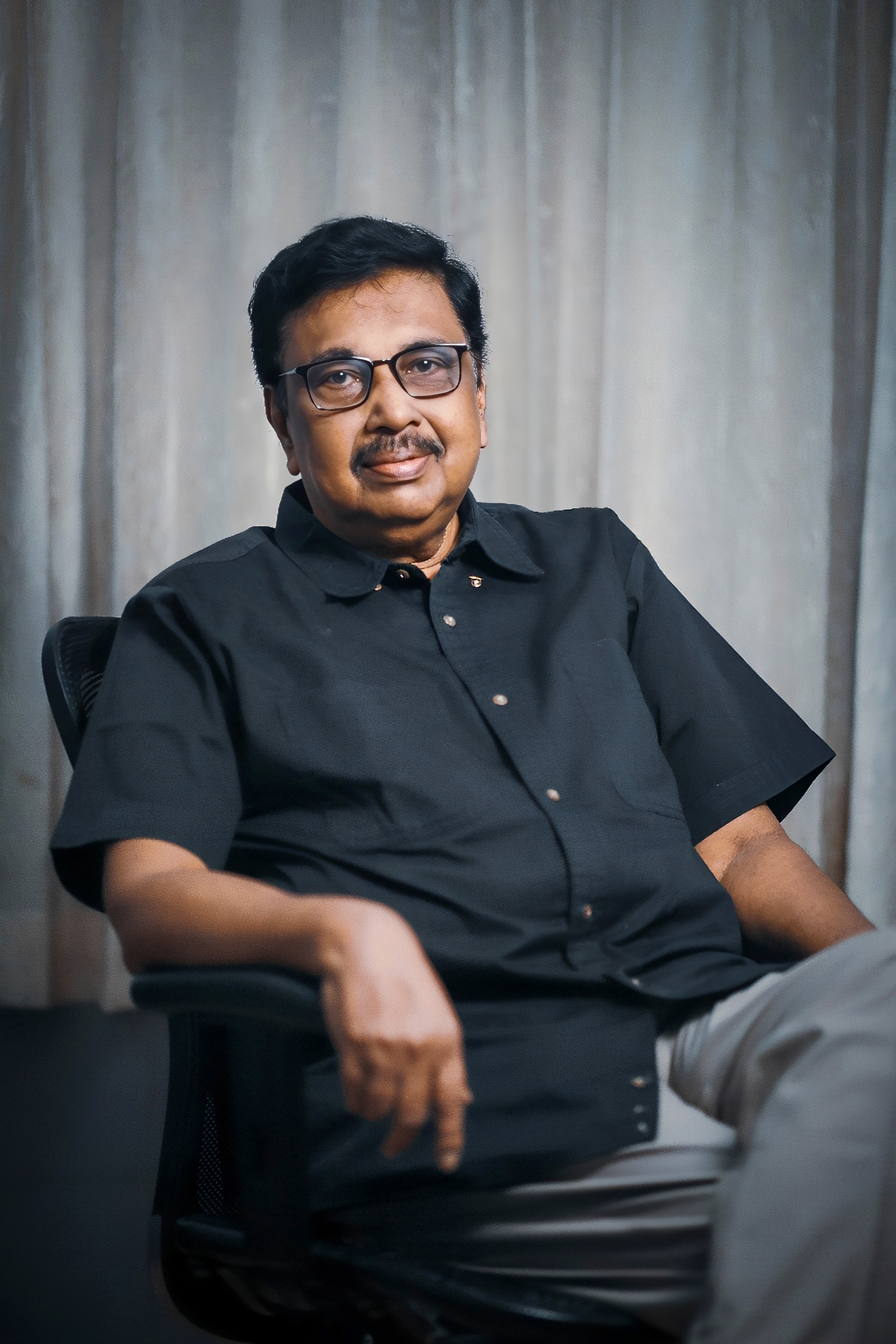

General Secretary of Dravidar Viduthalai Kazhagam
- Incumbent
- Assumed office 12 August 2012
- President: Kolathur Mani
- Preceded by: Post established

Personal details
- Born: 16 October 1947 (age 78) Mayuram, Madras Province, Dominion of India (later Mayiladuthurai, Tamil Nadu, India)
- Citizenship: Indian
- Party: Dravidar Viduthalai Kazhagam (2012-present)
- Other political affiliations: Dravidar Kazhagam (1969-96) Periyar Dravidar Kazhagam (1996-2001; 200?-2012) Thanthai Periyar Dravidar Kazhagam (2001-200?)
- Spouse: Saraswathy (m. 1979)

Kandhasamy Rajendran, commonly known as Viduthalai Rajendran, is the General Secretary of the Dravidar Viduthalai Kazhagam party. He is the founder and editor-in-chief of the weekly Puratchi Periyar Muzhakkam.
