= Periyar and Tamil grammar =

Dravidian social reformer (1879–1973)

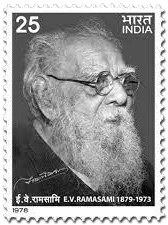
Periyar

Periyar (17 September 1879 – 24 December 1973) was a Dravidian social reformer and politician from India, who founded the Self-Respect Movement and Dravidar Kazhagam. Periyar placed great importance on the Tamil language for its benefit and upliftment to the Tamil people and advocated for its preservation..

In the wake of the imposition of Hindi throughout the Indian sub-continent and in Tamil Nadu, Periyar stated that "the love of one's tongue is the foremost of all loves that are required of the people born in our land. He said that has no love for his tongue has no love for his land. A nation functions on the basis for the love of one's language. So it is my prayer that Tamils love for their tongue should grow. I affirm again and again that love of the mother-tongue is a must for those born in Tamil Nadu. The Bengalis love Bengali. The Maharashtrians love for the Marathi language. The Andhras love the Telugu language. But the Tamils have no love for the Tamil-tongue. The Tamils will never progress unless they bestow love on their mother-tongue. If I love Tamil, it is not merely because it is the mother-tongue or the language of the Tamil Nadu State. Nor am I attached to Tamil by reason of its uniqueness or its antiquity. If I love Tamil, it is because I am aware of the advantages I expect through it and the measure of loss that will occur by the absence of it".

== Critique of the Tamil language ==
Periyar raised praises and criticisms of Tamil and other Dravidian languages by stating "as I am aware of the disadvantages of another language being imposed on our country, I am intolerant of it and oppose it, I do not resist it merely because it is new or it belongs to another land. It is my opinion that the Tamil language is capable of contributing to the progress and freedom of the people in all fields, and will be conductive to a life of dignity and reason. However, people may ask whether all such resources are available in Tamil. Even if all these qualities are not found, I am aware that Tamil has arts, customs, traditions, and an appropriate vocabulary, which can contribute to a greater advancement than most other languages in India. Therefore, other languages that are likely to cause disadvantage to Tamil is unwelcome".

Periyar claimed that Tamil, Telugu, Malayalam, and Kannada came from the same tongue, or same mother language of Old Tamil. He explained that the Tamil language is called by four different names since it is spoken in four different Dravidian states, and thus she has four different names. With relation to writing, Periyar stated that using the Tamil script about the arts which are useful to the people in their life and which foster knowledge, talent and courage, and propagating them among the masses, thereby will enlighten the people. Further, he explained that it will enrich the language, and thus it can be regarded as a zeal for Tamil. Periyar believed that Tamil language will make the Dravidian people unite under the banner of Tamil culture, and that it will make the Kannadigas, Andhras and the Malayalees be vigilant. With regards to a Dravidian alliance under a common umbrella language, Periyar stated that "a time will come for unity. This will go on till there is an end to the North Indian domination. We shall reclaim an independent sovereign state for us".

Periyar was also known to have issued controversial remarks on Tamil language and Tamil people from time to time. On one occasion, he referred to Tamil people as "barbarians" and Tamil language as the "language of barbarians". However, Anita Diehl explains that Periyar made these remarks on Tamil because it had no respective feminine verbal forms.

== Tamil alphabet reform ==
Periyar took the Tamil reformation ideas suggested by Tamil scholars and implemented in his Viduthalai journal on Tamil alphabet reforms and his reasons were for the following such as the vowel 'ஈ' (i), having a cursive and looped representation of the short form, 'இ' (I). In stone inscriptions of 400 or 500 years ago, many Tamil letters are found in other shapes. As a matter of necessity and advantage to cope with the printing technology, Periyar thought that it was sensible to change a few letters, reduce the number of letters, and alter a few signs. He further explained that the older and the more divine a language and its letters were said to be, they need reform. Because of changes brought about by means of modern transport and international contact, and happenings that have attracted words and products from many countries, foreign words and their pronunciations have been assimilated into Tamil quite easily. Just as a few compound characters have separate signs to indicate their length as in ' கா ', ' கே ' (kA:, kE:), Periyar argued why should not other compound characters like ' கி ', ' கீ ', 'கு ', ' கூ ' (kI, ki:, kU, ku:) (indicated integrally as of now), also have separate signs. Further, changing the shape of letters, creating new symbols and adding new letters and similarly, dropping those that are redundant, were quite essential according to Periyar. Thus, the glory and excellence of a language and its script depend on how easily they can be understood or learned and on nothing else".
