= Dravidar Viduthalai Kazhagam =

Indian social movement

- Abbreviation: DVK (தி.வி.க.)
- Predecessor: Periyar Dravidar Kazhagam (PDK)
- Formation: 12 August 2012 (14 years ago)
- Purpose: Dravidianism; Tamil nationalism
- President: Kolathur Mani
- General Secretary: Viduthalai Rajendran
- Publication: Puratchi Periyar Muzhakkam (weekly)
- Website: http://dvkperiyar.com/

Dravidar Viduthalai Kazhagam (DVK) is a social movement in the state of Tamil Nadu. It is a splinter group of Periyar Dravidar Kazhagam. Its policy is to bring out social reform along the lines envisaged by Periyar E. V. Ramasamy.

It was founded on 12 August 2012. The party president is Kolathur Mani and Viduthalai Rajendran is the general secretary.
