= Samathuvapuram =

Samathuvapuram (transl. Equality Village) officially Periyar Ninaivu Samathuvapuram (Periyar Memorial Equality Village) is a social equality scheme of the Government of Tamil Nadu to improve social harmony and to reduce caste discrimination. Under the scheme, villages of 100 houses each are being created to accommodate the various castes, with one community hall and burial ground to be shared by all. The scheme is named after the social reformer Periyar E. V. Ramasamy.

== Background ==
In 1997, the Government of Tamil Nadu decided to change the name of a transport corporation in the Virudhunagar district to the Sundaralingam Transport Corporation, in honour of 18th-century general Veeran Sundaralingam. The name change was the long-time demand of the Dalit Pallar community, which considered Sundaralingam the icon of their community. However, backward caste Thevars opposed the decision since the transport corporation would bear a Dalit name. Thevars torched the transport buses and attacked the drivers. In response, Dalits vandalised U. Muthuramalingam Thevar's statue. Incidents by both castes sparked violence in the southern districts of Tamil Nadu.

== Scheme ==
The scheme aims to ease the situation and to integrate the Dalits segregated by the caste system to begin using the wells and temples of the dominant communities. The Chief Minister of Tamil Nadu M. Karunanidhi introduced the housing scheme to create villages of 100 houses each. Each village is subdivided into 40 houses for Dalits, 25 houses for backward caste, 25 houses for most backward caste, and 10 for other communities. To avoid caste discrimination, the Samathuvapuram would have one community hall for all communities, as well as a common burial ground. The first samathuvapuram inaugurated by M. Karunanidhi on 17 August 1997 in the Melakottai village near Tirumangalam, Madurai. The Scheme was introduced in FY 1997-98 by Government of Tamil Nadu. By 2001, 145 samathuvapurams were opened across Tamil Nadu.

Following the change in the state government in 2001, the scheme was abandoned. In 2006, the scheme was revived after M. Karunanidhi came to power. During his tenure, 95 samathuvapurams were opened state-wide.
