= Thirudi (1974 film) =

- Theatrical release poster
- Directed by: Madurai Thirumaran
- Screenplay by: Madurai Thirumaran
- Story by: Mahendran
- Produced by: N. P. Ramu
- Starring: Jaishankar; K. R. Vijaya
- Cinematography: N. S. Varma; P. B. Masilamani
- Edited by: S. P. S. Veerappan
- Music by: M. S. Viswanathan
- Production company: M. S. Kasi
- Distributed by: Jayaraman Pictures
- Release date: 29 March 1974
- Running time: 167 minutes
- Country: India
- Language: Tamil

Thirudi (transl. Lady thief) is a 1974 Indian Tamil-language film written and directed by Madurai Thirumaran, from a story by Mahendran. The film stars Jaishankar as a pathological liar and K. R. Vijaya as the titular thief. It was released on 29 March 1974, and became a success.

== Plot ==
Rani, after being separated from her brother, lives as a thief. She later meets a man who lives by pathological lying.

== Cast ==
- Jaishankar
- K. R. Vijaya as Rani
- V. K. Ramasamy
- Nagesh
- S. A. Ashokan
- Thengai Srinivasan
- S. V. Ramadas
- Sasikumar
- Suruli Rajan
- R. S. Manohar
- Oru Viral Krishna Rao
- A. Sakunthala
- Kumari Padmini
- M. Bhanumathi
- Sridevi

== Soundtrack ==
The music was composed by M. S. Viswanathan, with lyrics by Kannadasan.

Track listing
| No. | Title | Singer(s) | Length |
|---|---|---|---|
| 1. | "Kelungal" | L. R. Eswari, T. M. Soundararajan |
| 2. | "Poga Mudinthal" | P. Susheela |
| 3. | "Nilavu Vanthu" | P. Susheela, S. P. Balasubrahmanyam |
| 4. | "En Paadal" | S. Janaki |

== Critical reception ==
Kanthan of Kalki felt despite Vijaya's good performance, the screenplay completely wasted her but praised the acting of other actors, humour and direction but panned the cinematography and concluded one needs to find out what kind of message this film conveys.
