= E. V. R. Nagammai =

Indian women's rights activist

Annai E. V. R. Nagammai
- Born: 1885; Thathampatti, Salem, Madras Presidency
- Died: 11 May 1933 Erode
- Occupations: Social activist and women's rights activist

Erode Venkatappa Ramasamy Nagammai (1885 – 11 May 1933) was an Indian social activist and women's rights activist. She was known for her participation in the Temperance movement in India and the Vaikom Satyagraha. She was the first wife of Periyar E. V. Ramasamy who headed the Self-Respect Movement.

== Early life ==
Nagammai was born in 1885 to Rangasamy and Ponnuthai in Thathampatti, Salem, Madras Presidency. She had no formal education. She was the cousin of Ramasamy and married him at the age of thirteen in 1898. The couple had a daughter who died when she was five months old.

== Activities ==
In 1919, Ramasamy joined the Indian National Congress. Nagammai actively supported his political career. When Mahatma Gandhi called for the Temperance movement, she organised the women to picket the toddy shops in Erode. As the movement turned violent in some parts of the country, the Congress leaders requested Gandhi to stop the agitations. Gandhi replied that the matter was "not in his hands, but in the hands of two women at Erode", referring to Nagammai and her sister in law, Kannamal.

As untouchability prevailed in the Travancore region, low caste people were prohibited from entering the temple and the streets around it. Congress started the Vaikom Satyagraha, a protest to allow access for all to the prohibited places. Nagammai and Ramasamy joined the protest on 14 April 1924. She led the women during the protests and was arrested in May 1924.

When Ramasamy started the Self-Respect Movement in 1925. Nagammai encouraged women to participate in the movement. She conducted several widow remarriages and Self-Respect marriages. She was the editor of Kudi Arasu magazine when Ramasamy went on tour to Europe.

== Legacy ==
Nagammai died on 11 May 1933 in Erode. There are several schools in Tamil Nadu named after her. The Government of Tamil Nadu introduced Periyar EVR Nagammai Free Education scheme to fund free higher education for girls in the state.
