= Periyar Dravidar Kazhagam =

Political party of Tamil Nadu, India

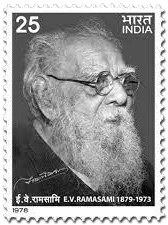
Periyar Erode Venkatappa Ramasamy, also called Periyar after whom the party is named

Periyar Dravidar Kazhagam was a political party in the Indian state of Tamil Nadu. It split from Dravidar Kazhagam in 1996. The president of the party is 'Kolathur' Mani and its general secretary is 'Viduthalai' Rajendran. In August 2012, Periyar Dravidar Kazhagam split into two factions: Dravidar Viduthalai Kazhagam, led by Kolathur Mani and Thanthai Periyar Dravidar Kazhagam, led by K. Ramakrishnan.
