= Lalai Singh Yadav =

Indian social activist, publisher, and former policeman (1911–1993)

Chaudhary Lalai Singh Yadav
- Born: 1 September 1911; Kathara, Kanpur Dehat district, Uttar Pradesh, India
- Died: 7 February 1993 (aged 81)
- Writing career
- Language: Hindi

Periyar Lalai Singh Yadav (1 September 1911 – 7 February 1993) was a policeman who became a social justice activist and play writer. He wrote plays like Shambhuk Vadh. He translated Periyar E. V. Ramasamy's The Key To Understanding True Ramayan from Tamil to Hindi as Sachi Ramayan Ki Chabi. In 1962, he wrote a book entitled Baman Vadi Rajya Mein Shoshito Par Rajnaitik Dakaiti. He fought a free speech case against the UP Government on his book ban.

== Early life ==
Periyar Lalai Singh Yadav was born on 1 September 1911 in Kanpur, Uttar Pradesh, into a Yadav family. His father, Chaudhari Gajju Singh, was a farmer who owned agricultural land and a mango orchard, and was associated with the Arya Samaj movement. Singh received formal education up to the middle level (equivalent to class seven) before briefly serving as a forest guard in 1929. In 1931, he was married, and two years later, in 1933, he enlisted as a constable in the army of the princely state of Gwalior.

== Career ==
Lalai Singh is most recognized for translating E.V. Ramasamy Periyar's controversial work The Ramayana: A True Reading into Hindi as Sachchi Ramayana in 1968. The publication provoked significant public and governmental outrage, resulting in its ban by the Uttar Pradesh government on grounds of inciting religious sentiments. Nevertheless, following a sustained legal challenge led by his counsel, the Allahabad High Court lifted the ban in 1971—a judgment subsequently affirmed by the Supreme Court of India in 1976. He wrote plays on Shambuka and Ekalavya and provided alternate subaltern readings of myths and mythologies. Dharmveer Yadav Gagan has compiled Lalai Singh's writings and speeches in five volumes.

Lalai Singh renounced Hinduism and embraced Buddhism in 1967, along with thousands of other Dalits and OBCs. He removed the surname 'Yadav' from his name and replaced it with the surname Buddh. He died on 7 February 1993 at the age of 81.

== See also ==
- Triveni Sangh
- Arjak Sangh
