= Poondi Kumaraswamy =

Indian hydrologist (1930–1988)

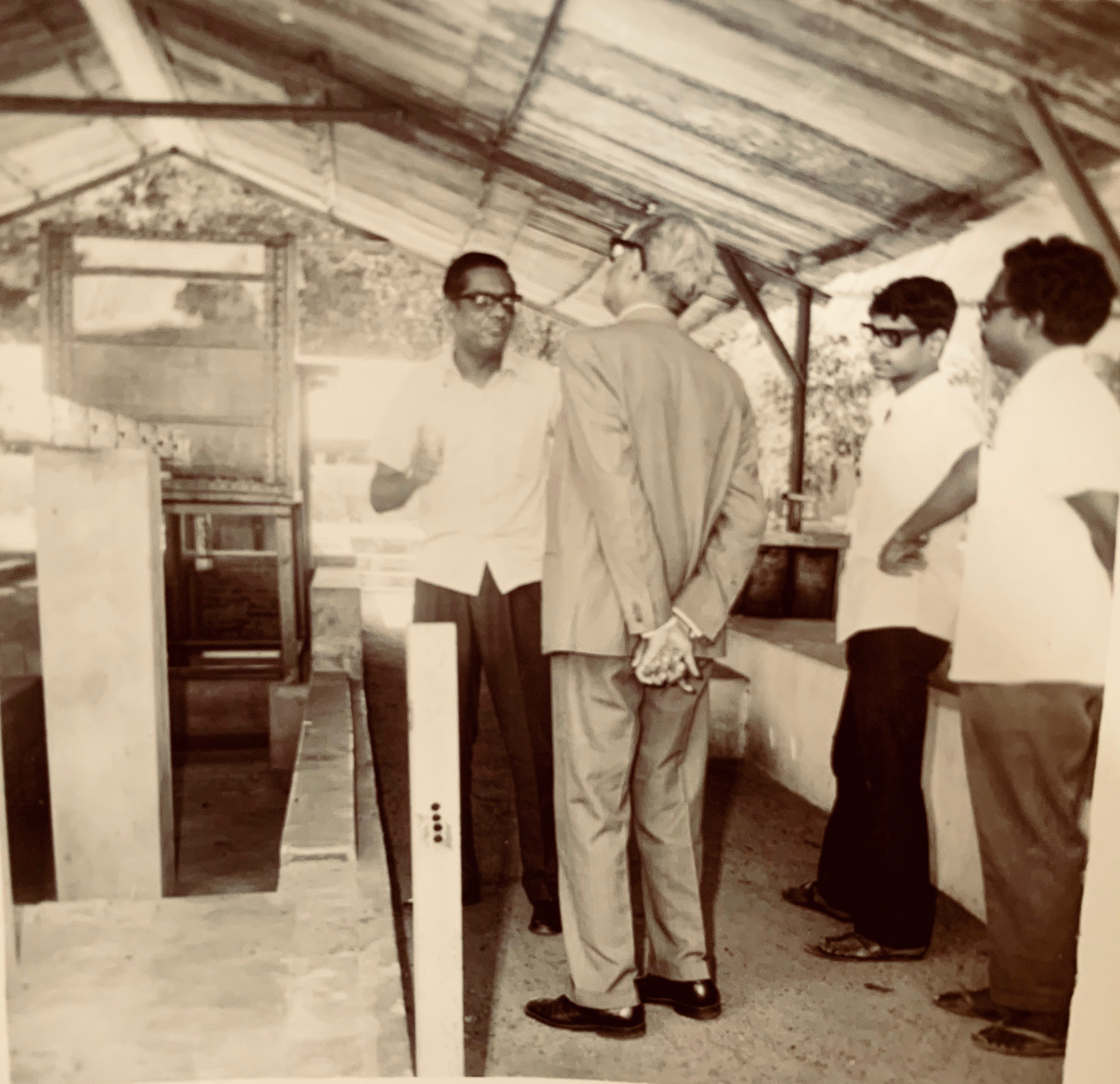
Showing around IHH to the Central Government Irrigation Minister Dr K. L. Rao

Ponnambalam Kumaraswamy (often referred to as Poondi Kumaraswamy; October 4, 1930 – March 9, 1988) was an Indian hydrologist.

== Career ==
He was elected a Fellow of the Indian Academy of Sciences in 1972 although his only formal education was a Civil Engineering Bachelor's degree from College of Engineering, Guindy, University of Madras. Before his death in 1988, at 57 years old, he was the only one to have received both the Homi Bhabha Fellowship 1967–1969 (he spent his time at the Tata Institute of Fundamental Research, Bombay, and at the Massachusetts Institute of Technology, Cambridge, Massachusetts doing research in Groundwater modeling) and the Jawaharlal Nehru Fellowship 1975–1977, two of the country's top research awards.

During the period of Jawaharlal Nehru Fellowship, he created the first comprehensive 20-volume hydrological atlas of Tamil Nadu State of India, including mathematical models, details of hydraulic structures, among others. He also developed the double-bounded probability density function (Kumaraswamy distribution), a probability density function suitable for physical variables that are usually bounded. This distribution is in use in electrical, civil, mechanical, and financial engineering applications. He gave the first practical hard rock well theory that won him the Gold Medal award from Indian Geohydrologists in 1974. He also worked as a design and construction engineer of two major industrial works, namely, the Tiruchirappalli Boiler Plant, and the Tuticorin Harbour Project. In addition, he was involved in the hydraulic design of numerous dams, canals, and other hydraulic structures throughout South India. Kumaraswamy considered explaining the work of the Institute of Hydraulics and Hydrology (IHH), Poondi to engineers and non-engineers an important duty and often had great success with it.

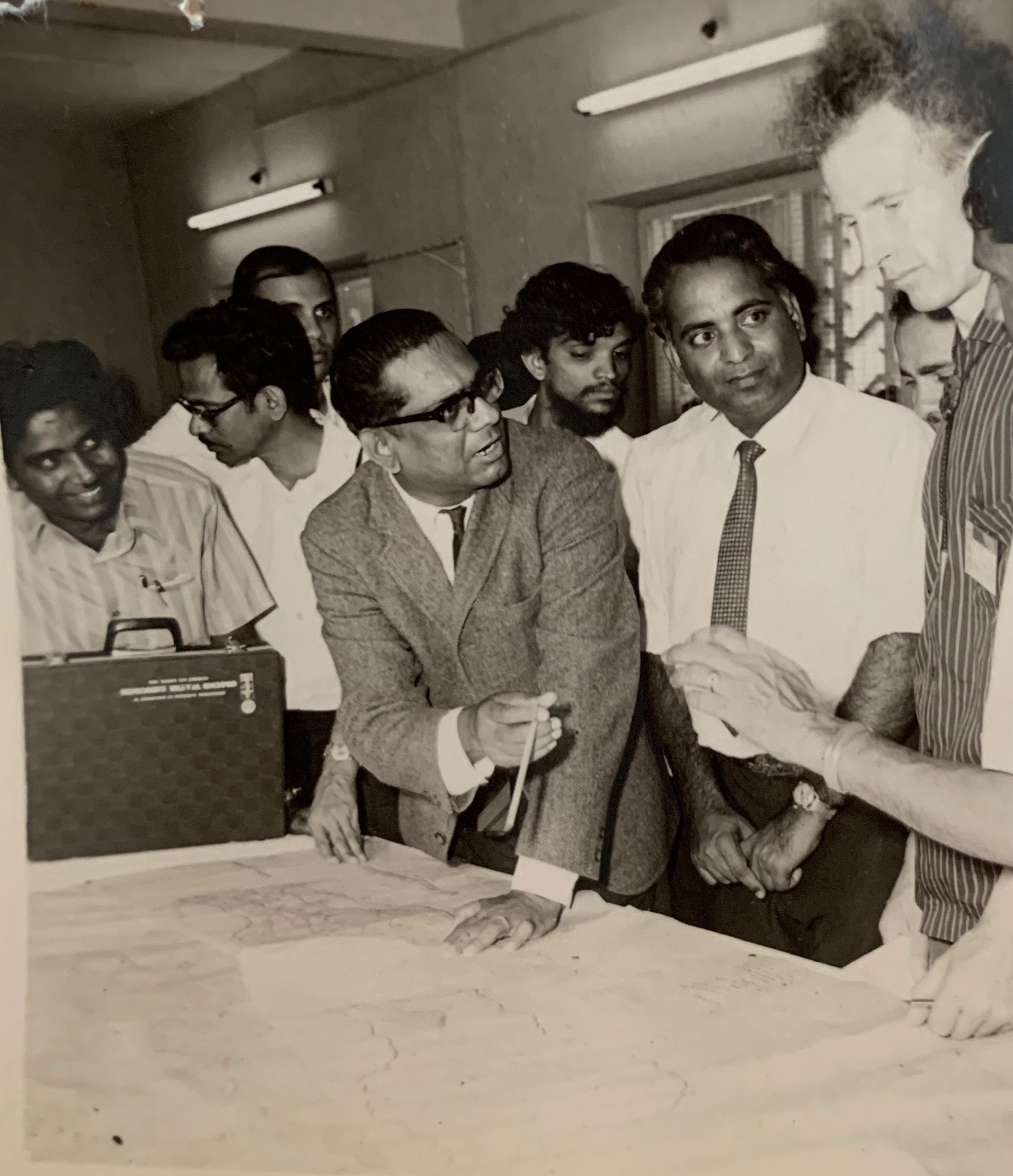
With visitors during the Silver Jubilee celebration of the IHH

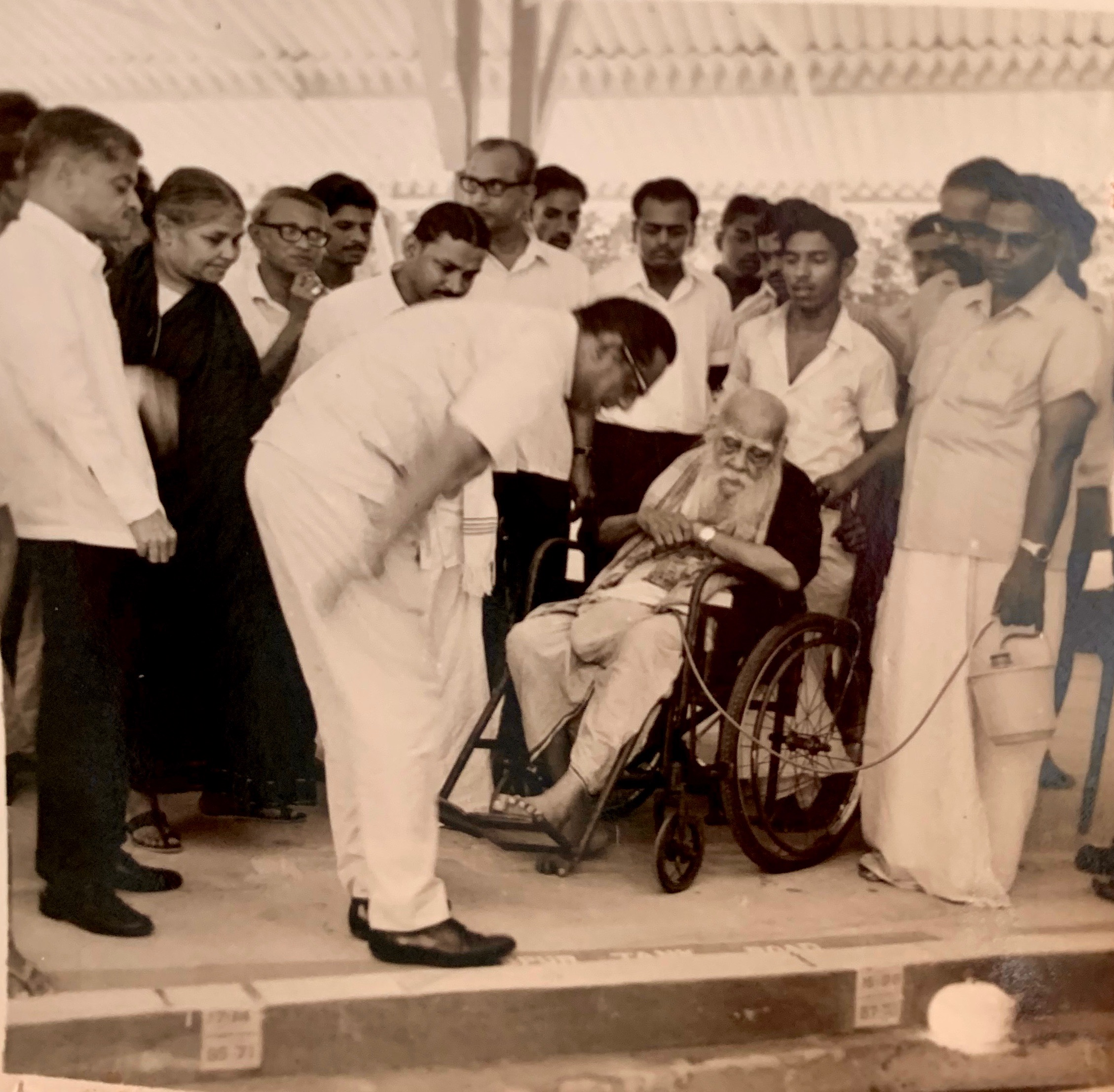
Explaining hydraulic models to visitors Periyar, Maniammai, and Veeramani
