= E. V. R. Maniammai =

Dravidian social activist and politician (1917–1978)

President of the Dravidar Kazhagam
- In office 25 December 1973 – 16 March 1978
- Preceded by: Periyar
- Succeeded by: K. Veeramani

Personal details
- Born: 10 March 1917 Vellore, Madras Presidency, British India (present-day Tamil Nadu, India)
- Died: 16 March 1978 (aged 61) Vellore, Tamil Nadu, India
- Resting place: Periyar Ninaividam
- Party: Dravidar Kazhagam
- Other political affiliations: Justice Party and INC
- Spouse: E. V. Ramasami (m. 1948; died 1973)
- Occupation: Politician; social activist

Erode Venkatappa Ramasami Maniammai (10 March 1917 – 16 March 1978) was a Dravidian social activist and politician. She was the second wife of Periyar and succeeded him as the president of the Dravidar Kazhagam upon his death in 1973.

== Biography ==
Maniammai was born as Kanthimathi to Kanagasabai Mudaliar, who was a member of the Justice Party. Soon after her father's death, she joined the Dravidar Kazhagam founded by Periyar in 1942–1943. Sources close to Periyar had indicated that Maniyammai, being a woman, could not be named his heir. So he took to the recourse of marrying her so that she could become his legal heir. His marriage with a much younger Maniammai and his appointment of her as his successor shocked many of his party leaders.

Then Tamil Nadu Chief Minister M. G. Ramachandran and his arch rival M. Karunanidhi paid their final respects to the mortal remains of Maniyammai at funeral at Periyar thidal in 1978.
