= K. Veeramani =

Indian politician (born 1933)

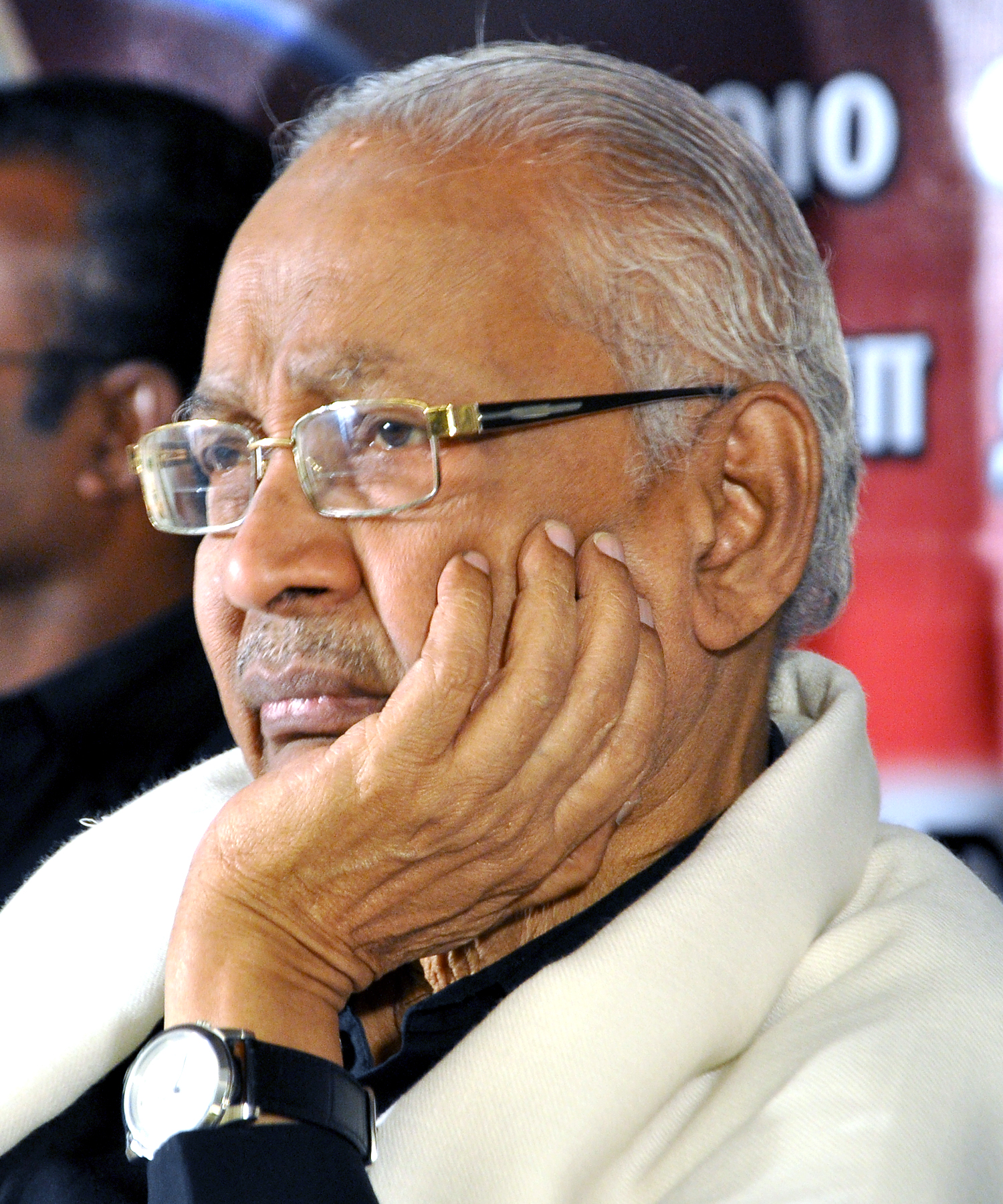

President of Dravidar Kazhagam
- Incumbent
- Assumed office 17 March 1978
- Preceded by: Annai E. V. R. Maniammai

General Secretary of Dravidar Kazhagam
- Incumbent
- Assumed office 1962

Personal details
- Born: 2 December 1933 (age 92) Cuddalore, South Arcot District, Madras Presidency, British India
- Party: Dravidar Kazhagam
- Other political affiliations: Justice Party
- Spouse: Mohana
- Children: 4
- Education: M.A., B.L.
- Occupation: Lawyer and social worker

Krishnasamy Veeramani (born 2 December 1933) is an Indian politician. He is also the president of Dravidar Kazhagam.

== Personal ==
Veeramani was born in Cuddalore, South Arcot District, Tamil Nadu, his original name was Sarangapani. He had his primary education at Cuddalore and entered Annamalai University for higher education. He obtained his master's degree in economics in 1956. He received his Bachelor of Law degree from Madras University in 1960.

== Public life ==
K. Veeramani came into limelight when as a boy of just 10, he was allowed to address the gathering in the Justice Party Salem conference in 1944. He was introduced as an activist by Annadurai. Apart from the one year in which he practiced as a lawyer in Cuddalore, his career has been as a social worker. He began working with Periyar in 1956, and assisted Periyar in editing Viduthalai, the rationalist daily of Dravidar Kazhagam. In 1962, he was made the executive editor of Viduthalai and since 1978 has been the editor. On 16 March 1978, Maniyammai died. The Managing Committee of the Dravidar Kazhagam elected K. Veeramani as General Secretary of the Dravidar Kazhagam on 17 March 1978. He was active in the social campaigns and agitations launched by Periyar for support of 'socially discriminated people,' and was incarcerated forty times for his activities. He was jailed under MISA for a year in 1976 for opposing The Emergency. He was again jailed in 1978 for showing black flags against Indira Gandhi for imposing Emergency while in power. While he was in jail, his father, C. S. Krishnasamy, died.

== Awards ==
Alagappa University conferred the Doctor of Law on him (Honoris Causa) on 4 April 2003. Periyar International Inc., (USA) gives an annual award for outstanding contributions to Social Justice, which is named in his honor. Mr. V. P. Singh, former Prime Minister of India, was the first recipient of the award. K.Veeramani is an Honorary Associate of Rationalist International.

Lifetime Achievement Award

In recognition and praise of Dravidar Kazhagam President Asiriyar K.Veeramani's humanist services, the American Humanist Association conferred the prestigious Lifetime Achievement Award for the year 2019 at the International Conference held on 21 and 22 September 2019.

American Humanist Association, a group of self-less, service-oriented humanitarians, has been promoting the cause of humanism for the past 75 years striving tirelessly for social justice and the welfare of the people.

=== List of K. Veeramani Awardees for Social Justice ===
Year	Awardee	Notes
1996	Vishwanath Pratap Singh	Former prime minister of India
1997	Sitaram Kesari	Former president, Congress Party of India
1998	Chandarajit Yadav	Former union minister, India
1999		
2000	Mayawati	Former chief minister, Uttarpradesh, India
2001		
2002	ST Moorthy	Senior Periyarist, Singapore
2003	G. K. Moopanar	Former president, Tamil Nadu Congress Party, India
2004		
2005	B.S.A. Swamy	Former judge, Andra High Court, Hyderabad
2006	Veera Munusamy	Yangoon, Myanmar
2007		
2008	Karunanidhi	Former chief minister, Tamil Nadu, India
2009	Ravivarma Kumar	Advocate general, Karnataka, India
2010	Chellaperumal	Social worker, Kuwait
2011	G. Karunanithy	General secretary, All-India OBC Organization
2011	Kalaiselvam	President, Periyar Community Service, Singapore
2012	V. Hanumantha Rao M.P.	Convenor, OBC MPs Forum
2013	Chhagan C. Bhujbal	Former PWD minister, Maharastra, India
2014	Prof. Dhaneswar Sahoo	President, Odisha Rationalist Society, Bhubaneshwar, India
2015	Nitish Kumar	Chief minister, Bihar since February 2015, Bihar, India
2016	Michael Selvanayagam	Deputy mayor, elected Councillor, Croydon, London
