= Dravidar Kazhagam =

Anti-caste social movement

Dravida Kazhagam
- Founder: Periyar
- Founded: 1938
- Preceded by: Justice Party
- Succeeded by: DMK
- Headquarters: Chennai
- Newspaper: Viduthalai
- Ideology: Humanism; Social justice Dravidian nationalism Anti-Brahminism; Atheism
- Political position: Left-wing

Party flag

Website
- https://dravidarkazhagam.in/

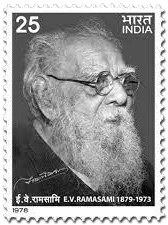
E. V. Ramasamy, Leader of the Dravidar Kazhagam

Dravidar Kazhagam is a social movement founded by Periyar. Its original goals were to eradicate the ills of the existing caste and class system including untouchability and on a grander scale to obtain a "Dravida Nadu" (Dravidian Nation) from the Madras Presidency. Dravidar Kazhagam would in turn give birth to many other political parties, including Dravida Munnetra Kazhagam and later the All India Anna Dravida Munnetra Kazhagam.

== History ==
Founded by Periyar, the roots of the Dravidar Kazhagam lie in the Self-Respect Movement and Justice Party. Periyar formed the Self-Respect Movement in 1925, breaking in the process from the Indian National Congress party, of which he had been a member until then. The Justice Party, formed in 1916, also claimed to promote similar interests. The two entities merged in 1938 under Periyar's leadership. The name was changed to Dravidar Kazhagam in 1944.

== Ideology ==
Being completely opposed to the Brahminical social, political and ritual dominance of southern India, the primary purpose of the Dravida Kazhagam was to secure the complete independence of a Dravidian Republic (Dravida Nadu). The party at its inception retained similar values to the Justice Party, which had the views of a traditional type of balance signifying the idea of equality. Being heavily influenced by Periyar's Self-Respect Movement, it also adopted many of its goals and objectives. A few of these similarities were eliminating the caste, class, and creed divide amongst people to foster a balanced society, working towards the elimination of inequality and ensuring that men and women have equal opportunities towards all aspects of life, and pushing for the eradication of superstitious beliefs based on religion.

== Conflict years ==
As the party gained prominence, many in the party wanted to contest in the elections, including C. N. Annadurai. However, Periyar argued that politics would force ideology into the background. With a straining relationship in the organization and Periyar marrying Maniyammai, who was more than 40 years younger than him, some members of the party broke apart and formed the Dravida Munnetra Kazhagam. Periyar marrying a girl of younger age caused strains within the organization and outside it. Then M. G. Ramachandran who was a former actor and is a treasurer, later he had some quarrels with M. Karunanidhi, whom to become the chief minister. Then M.G.R went out of the party to form a new party called All India Anna Dravida Munnetra Kazhagam formed at Madurai on 17 October 1972 as a breakaway faction from the Dravida Munnetra Kazhagam. Periyar stubbornly opposed it and was very angry with him. Then he also became the mentor of the Dravida Munnetra Kazhagam.

The organization was headed by Maniammai and later by K.Veeramani after her demise.

== List of presidents ==
S.No.	Portrait	Name (Birth–Death)	Term of office		
S.No.	Portrait	Name (Birth–Death)	From	To	Days in office
1		E. V. Ramasami (1879–1973)	27 August 1944	24 December 1973	(29 years, 119 days)
2		E. V. R. Maniammai (1917–1978)	25 December 1973	16 March 1978	(4 years, 81 days)
3		K. Veeramani (1933–)	16 March 1978	Incumbent	(48 years, 250 days)

== Later years ==
Periyar's protests were largely symbolic and did not call for the destruction of private property or physically harming anyone. It based its interests on anti-Hindi and anti-Brahmin agitations and never became a full-fledged political party.

== Dravidar Kazhagam flag ==
The Dravida Kazhagam Flag

The flag of Dravidar Kazhagam can trace its origins back to 1937. During that year, Hindi was made a compulsory subject in South India. In reaction to this, E.V. Ramaswamy organised anti-Hindi protests, in which a plain black flag was flown. From these protests, Periyar gained a large amount of popularity and went onto be elected as the president of the Justice Party a year later. When the Justice Party was rebranded as the Dravida Kazhagam in 1944, the party adopted its official flag. The design features a red circle with a black background with the colour black representing "the deprivations and the indignities that the Dravidians had to face under the strict Hindu religion" while red represented "the tireless efforts taken to eliminate the ignorance and blind faith among the people and to free them from any kind of mental and materialistic exploitation".

== Activities ==
The party often adopted a hard-line approach and was often involved in mass attempts to change the system outright. One such incident involved bringing Adi Dravidas into the inner sanctum sanctorum of temples and threatening Brahmin priests to recite hymns in Tamil instead of Sanskrit. During Indian independence in 1947, the party did not accept the same as Periyar viewed Independence as the transfer of power from British to the Brahmin-Bania combine who occupied all important positions. With a firm belief that caste-based reservations are the only way to empower the under-represented, they supported reservations in education and employment right from 1919. Periyar was instrumental in introducing reservation to the non-Brahmins in Tamil Nadu from 1921 even before independence.

== Legacy ==
The organization laid the foundation for further Tamil involvement in politics. It enthused a new Tamil spirit that later on led to the formation of many parties that would eventually challenge the Indian National Congress stranglehold. Though it failed to achieve its grandiose idea of an independent Dravidian nation, it fostered a spirit of unity amongst the Dravidians, especially in opposing Hindi as India's sole official language in the sixties.

Dravida Kazhagam strongly rooted for the implementation of Mandal Commission report, which was later adopted by the V.P. Singh led government in 1990. It has also involved itself in the Srilankan Tamils issue and has been vocal in the support of LTTE.

== See also ==
- List of political parties in India
