= Patronymic =

Component of a personal name based on the given name of one's male ancestor

A patronymic, or patronym, is a personal name, or component of a personal name, based on the given name of one's father, grandfather (more specifically an avonymic), or an earlier male ancestor. It is the male equivalent of a matronymic.

Patronymics are used, by custom or official policy, in many countries worldwide, although elsewhere their use has been replaced by or transformed into patronymic surnames. Examples of such transformations include common English surnames such as Johnson (son of John).

== Origins of terms ==
The usual noun and adjective in English is patronymic, but as a noun this exists in free variation alongside patronym. (Note: The Oxford English Dictionary records the corresponding metronymic and metronym, alongside matronymic but not, however, matronym.) The first part of the word patronym comes from Greek πατήρ patēr 'father' (GEN πατρός patros whence the combining form πατρο- patro-); the second part comes from Greek ὄνυμα onyma, a variant form of ὄνομα onoma 'name'. In the form patronymic, this stands with the addition of the suffix -ικός (-ikos), which was originally used to form adjectives with the sense 'pertaining to' (thus 'pertaining to the father's name'). These forms are attested in Hellenistic Greek as πατρώνυμος (patrōnymos) and πατρωνυμικός (patrōnymikos). The form patronym, first attested in English in 1834, was borrowed into English from French patronyme, which had previously borrowed the word directly from Greek. Patronymic, first attested in English in 1612, has a more complex history. Both Greek words had entered Latin, and, from Latin, French. The English form patronymic was borrowed through the mutual influence of French and Latin on English.

== History ==
In many areas around the world, patronyms predate the use of family names. Family names in many Celtic, Germanic, Iberian, Georgian, Armenian and Slavic languages originate from patronyms, e.g. Wilson (son of William), FitzGerald (son of Gerald), Powell (from "ap Hywel"), Fernández (son of Fernando), Rodríguez (son of Rodrigo), Andersson or Andersen (son of Anders, Scandinavian form of Andrew), Carlsen (son of Carl), Ilyin (of Ilya), Petrov (of Peter), Grigorovich (son of Grigory, Russian form of Gregory), Stefanović (son of Stefan, little Stefan), MacAllister (from "mac Alistair", meaning son of Alistair, anglicized Scottish form of Alexander) and O'Conor (from "Ó Conchobhair", meaning grandson/descendant of Conchobhar). Other cultures which formerly used patronyms have switched to the more widespread style of passing the father's last name to the children (and wife) as their own. In Iceland, family names are unusual; Icelandic law favours the use of patronyms (and more recently, matronyms) over family names.

== Historical and current use ==
=== Africa ===
Traditionally Muslim and non-Arabic speaking African people, such as Hausa and Fulani people, usually (with some exceptions) follow the Arab naming pattern. The word or phrase meaning "son of" is, however, omitted. As such, Mohamed son of Ibrahim son of Ahmed is "Mohamed Ibrahim Ahmed", and Mohamed Ibrahim Ahmed's son Ali is "Ali Mohamed Ibrahim".

==== Ethiopia and Eritrea ====
The naming convention used in Eritrea and Ethiopia does not have family names and surnames, similarly to neighbouring Somalia and Sudan. A person is referred to by a single name: this is always the person's given name. Ethiopians and Eritreans use a naming pattern very similar to the Arab naming pattern, but with one exception: no suffix or prefix. The full name of a person is usually two but officially registered with three names. The person's given name comes first, followed by their father's given name and (optionally, for official purposes) their grandfather's name last. For example, a person named Lemlem Mengesha Abraha has Lemlem as her given name, Mengesha (from her father's name) Abraha (grandfather's name). The grandfather's name is usually only added in official documents and not used in everyday life. The father's name is not considered a middle name but a last name, without it being a family name or surname. Married women do not take their husband's last name. They continue to go independently by their given name, followed by their father's name, and then their grandfather's name, even after marriage. In both Ethiopia and Eritrea, a person is always addressed by their first name; for example Mrs. Lemlem or Dr. Lemlem.

==== Kenya ====
Some Kenyan communities used patronyms. As of 2010, the practice has largely dropped off with the use of just the father's last name as a surname. Kalenjin use 'arap' meaning 'son of'; Kikuyu used 'wa' meaning 'of' (because of polygamy, 'wa' was also used with matronyms); Maasai use 'ole' meaning 'son of'; Meru use 'mto' (abbreviated M'; for example, 'son of Mkindia' would be 'M'Mkindia').

==== Mozambique ====
Patronymic naming is very common in parts of Mozambique. Although the practice is not universal, patronymic naming has been documented in the Zambezia province.

==== Nigeria ====
Although not as prominent as during the pre-colonial period, some Nigerians (particularly in the North) continue using patronymics—either as a middle name, as the first part of a hyphenated surname, or as a surname. An example of the use of patronymic middle names would be a man named Adamu Abdulkabiru Jibril—whereby "Adamu" would be his given first name, "Abdulkabiru" would be his father's given name as a patronymic middle name, and "Jibril" would be his hereditary family surname. Other people hyphenate their surname to include a patronymic, in which case the example would be named Adamu Abdulkabiru-Jibril with "Abdulkabiru-Jibril" acting as his surname. Using patronymics as the sole surname is also possible, with the example being named Adamu Abdulkabiru with "Abdulkabiru" acting as his surname.

==== Somalia ====
A Somali's full name is their given name followed by their father's given name, then their paternal grandfather's given name – the same naming convention used in neighbouring Eritrea and Ethiopia. Thus. they do not have a surname. Somalis traditionally use the first and second names to address someone. Somalis use their paternal grandfather's given name as their legal surname for documentation purposes. In formal address, they can also use the term "ina" or "iña" meaning "the son of" or "the daughter of," which is similar to other African and Arab naming patterns. For example, the name "Ahmed Mohamed Ali Farah" means "Ahmed son of Mohamed son of Ali son of Farah." When stating one's lineage, one will say "Ahmed ina Mohamed" (meaning Ahmed, the son of Mohamed). To identify themselves and the sub-clan they belong to, Somalis memorize their long lineage back to a common ancestor. Women never adopt their husband's patronym but keep their own for life.

==== South Africa ====
Among the Zulu, patronymics were used in the pre-colonial era. The prefix "ka" was attached to the father's name, for example Shaka kaSenzangakhona means Shaka son of Senzangakhona. The practice disappeared from everyday use with the introduction of the European-style surname system but still remains part of traditional cultural practices, particularly in the case of chieftains and royalty where reciting lineages forms a part of many ceremonial occasions.

==== South Sudan ====
South Sudanese generally follow Arabic naming customs in practicing patronymic naming, customarily with four names (a personal name followed by the person's father's name, paternal grandfather's name and patrilineal great-grandfather's name). South Sudanese nationality regulations adopted after independence in 2011 require witnesses of this family line. This system is complicated by baptismal names, which are often added by members of the Dinka and Nuer, the principal ethnic groups of South Sudan. Baptismal names are inconsistently retained by descendants. Out-of-wedlock births are another complicating factor. South Sudanese born out of wedlock may have their name attested by a maternal uncle and on the uncle's and his ancestors' patronymics. Personal names are often given after a relative or may reflect the circumstances of a person's birth. Among the Dinka, Nuer and Shilluk, boys and girls born during war are often named Tong and Atong, respectively.

==== Sudan ====
Sudanese also follow Arabic naming customs in practicing patronymic naming, customarily with three or four names (a personal name followed by the person's father's name, paternal grandfather's name and patrilineal great-grandfather's name). Most Sudanese also have a clan or family name, prefaced by "Al-" or "El-", which does not function as a surname. Muslim Sudanese women generally do not adopt a name from their husbands. In Western countries, Sudanese may use one of their patronymics or their clan name as a surname for administrative purposes, but these are not considered surnames in Sudan. When a surname is needed, it is most common to adopt the grandfather's name.

=== Central Asia ===
Since the dissolution of the Soviet Union, the citizens of the Central Asian republics have been attempting to de-Russify their surnames and patronymics.

==== Uzbekistan ====
Though the process of changing or modifying one's full name is not costly or time-consuming, Radio Free Europe/Radio Liberty reports that adult Uzbeks do not attempt to de-Russify the "-ovna" and "-ovich" patronymic suffixes to "-qizi" and "-o‘g‘li", though newborns get fully Uzbek names right away.

==== Kazakhstan ====
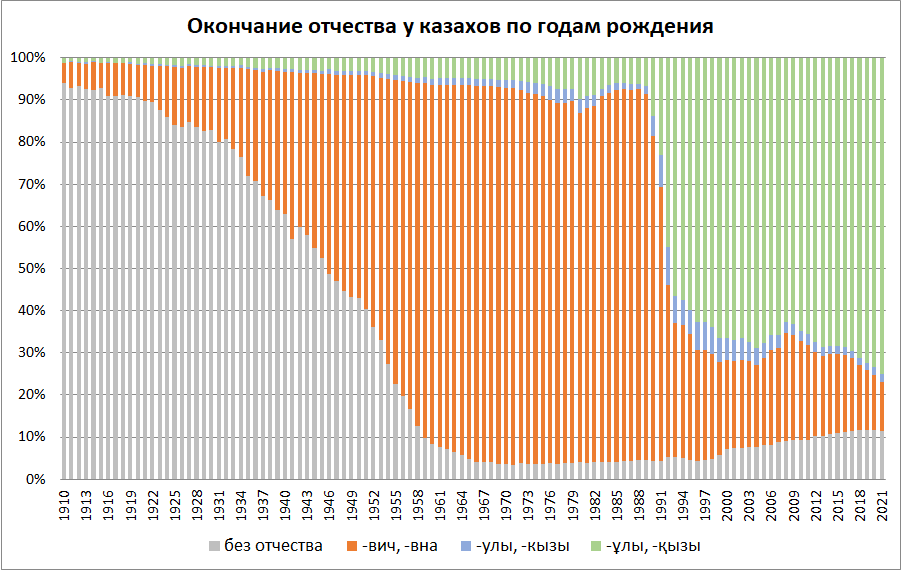
Patronymic endings of Kazakhs by birth year

In 1996, the law "About procedure for the solution of the questions connected with writing of surnames and middle names of persons of the Kazakh nationality" was introduced in Kazakhstan. It aimed to allow the amendment of surnames and patronymics "in accordance with the historically established traditions of the Kazakh people". Before Kazakhstan's independence in 1991, Kazakhs could not hold full names or, as it traditionally was beforehand, use patronymics instead of surnames. Bauyrjan Momyşūly, who refused the surname "Momyshev", opting for his patronymic, was a notable pre-Independence oppositionist to any Russified naming conventions.

At times, the qandas Kazakhs from China and Mongolia may have no patronymic and no surname. This may complicate the process of Kazakh naturalisation.

==== Kyrgyzstan ====
In 2022 and 2023, almost 12,000 Kyrgyz people Russified their surnames to include "-ova" and "-ov". This Russification also extended to patronymics, which were previously gendered as "-kyzy" for women and "-uulu" for men. This wave of Russification is linked to increased migrant work of Kyrgyz people in Russia, where the Kyrgyz naming was unfamiliar and "complicated". The opposing effect is observed as well, one notable example being the 2025 name change of Supreme Council Speaker Nurlanbek Shakiev to Nurlanbek Turgunbek uulu.

In June 2023, the Constitutional Court of Kyrgyzstan allowed the usage of a matronymic in "special cases". After social uproar, the Court cancelled its own decision in November of the same year.

==== Tajikistan ====
Since 2007, a trend of name de-Russification grew after President Emomali Sharipovich Rakhmonov (Note: In this name that follows East Slavic naming customs, the patronymic is Sharipovich and the family name is Rakhmonov.) changed his full name to Emomali Rahmon. Many civil servants followed suit, though, like in Kyrgyzstan, a reverse effect took place later as well, linked to migrant work in Russia.

=== East Asia ===
==== Taiwanese Aborigines ====
Atayal people's given names are followed by the name of their father; both sons and daughters use patronymics. Amis people's sons' given names are also followed by their father's name, while daughters' given names are followed by their mother's name. By contrast, the Seediqs often get to choose which parent's name goes after their own.

==== Mongolia ====
Mongol people's names are preceded by the name of their father and possessive marker; both sons and daughters use patronymics.

==== China ====
Many indigenous ethnic groups in Yunnan, such as Yi, Hani, Jingpo, Jino, Derung, Nu, Wa, Hmong and Yao, use a son-father patronymic naming system (亲子连名制). Historically, Naxi and Bai have also used the patronymic system. The last one or two syllables of the father's name transfers to become the first one or two syllables of the son's name. The last one or two syllables of the son's name is then used as the first one or two syllables of the grandson's name. The naming tradition is closely tied to Tibeto-Burman traditions.

This system can be seen in the names of Nanzhao, Dali and Lijiang rulers.

Nanzhao kings: Xinuluo (細奴邏)－Luosheng (邏盛)－Shengluopi (盛邏皮)－Piluoge (皮邏閣)－Geluofeng (閣邏鳳)－Fengjiayi (鳳迦異)－Yimouxun (異牟尋)－Xungequan (尋閣勸)－Quanlongsheng (勸龍晟)

Dali kings: Duan Zhixiang (段智祥)－Duan Xiangxing (段祥興)－Duan Xingzhi (段興智)

Regents of Dali Kingdom: Gao Shengtai (高升泰)－Gao Taiming (高泰明)－Gao Mingshun (高明順)－Gao Shunzhen (高順貞)－Gao Zhenshou (高貞壽)－Gao Shouchang (高壽昌)

Lijiang chiefs: A-ts'ung A-liang (阿琮阿良)－A-liang A-hu (阿良阿胡)－A-hu A-lieh (阿胡阿烈)－A-lieh A-chia (阿烈阿甲)－A-chia A-te (阿甲阿得)－A-te A-ch'u (阿得阿初)－A-ch'u A-t'u (阿初阿土)－A-t'u A-ti (阿土阿地)－A-ti A-hsi (阿地阿習)－A-hsi A-ya (阿習阿牙)－A-ya A-ch'iu (阿牙阿秋)－A-ch'iu A-kung (阿秋阿公)－A-kung A-mu (阿公阿目)－A-mu A-tu (阿目阿都)－A-tu A-sheng (阿都阿勝)－A-sheng A-chai (阿勝阿宅)－A-chai A-ssu (阿宅阿寺)－A-ssu A-ch'un (阿寺阿春)－A-ch'un A-su (阿春阿俗)－A-su A-wei (阿俗阿胃)－A-wei A-hui (阿胃阿揮)－A-hui A-chu (阿揮阿住)

=== South Asia ===
==== India ====
A patronymic is common in parts of India. For example, if a father is named Ramprasad Sachin Pandey (a masculine name), he might name his son Sunil Ramprasad Pandey, who in turn might name his son Sanjeev Sunil Pandey. As a result, unlike surnames, patronymics will not pass down through many generations.

In Tamil Nadu and some parts of Kerala and South Karnataka, patronymy is predominant. This is a significant departure from the rest of the country where caste names are mostly employed as surnames. This came into common use during the 1950s and 1960s when the Dravidian movement campaigned against the use of one's caste as part of the name.

However, rather than using the father's full name, only the first letter, popularly known as the initial, is prefixed to the given name. For example, if a person's given name is Nikhilesh and his father's Rajaraman, then the full name is R. Nikhilesh and is seldom expanded, even in official records. Only if absolutely necessary, such as when applying for an Indian passport, which does not usually allow initials, is the initial expanded and the name rendered in reverse order as "Nikhilesh Rajaraman" or sometime in the original order as "Rajaraman Nikhilesh". Some families follow the tradition of retaining the name of the hometown, the grandfather's name, or both as initials. The celebrated Indian English novelist R. K. Narayan's name at birth was Rasipuram Krishnaswami Ayyar Narayanaswami, which was shortened at the behest of his writer friend Graham Greene. Rasipuram is a toponym, and Krishnaswami Ayyar is a patronym.

In Tamil Nadu, the patronymic naming convention diverges significantly from other regions of India, influenced by a social justice movement aimed at eliminating caste-based discrimination. Traditionally, many Indian states used patronyms or surnames to reflect familial heritage and caste, but Tamil Nadu's system intentionally disrupts this structure.

In this system, individuals often use their father's given name as an initial or surname. For example, "R. Karthik" signifies Karthik, son of Rajesh, with "R" representing his father's name. Unlike other Indian states, where the patronym serves as a marker of lineage or social status, Tamil Nadu's system allows for the patronym to change with each generation, ensuring that no permanent surname is passed down. This shift reflects the state's broader efforts to dismantle caste markers in society, a key initiative of the Dravidian movement led by figures like Periyar E.V. Ramasamy in the 20th century.

However, the use of initials and surnames in Tamil Nadu remains flexible, leaving it to the individual's discretion. For instance, the late Chief Minister M. Karunanidhi preferred to be addressed as M. Karunanidhi, where "M" stood for his father, Muthuvel's, name. His son, M. K. Stalin, incorporates both his father's and grandfather's names, while Stalin's son chooses to go by Udhayanidhi Stalin, using his father's name as his surname rather than as an initial.

This flexibility extends beyond political figures. In sports, cricketer Ravichandran Ashwin, whose father's name is Ravichandran, prefers to be known as "R. Ashwin" or "Ravichandran Ashwin." This choice is particularly relevant in sports commentary, where players are often referred to by their surnames. Since it would be incorrect to call him by his father's name alone, Ashwin uses his given name in conjunction with his father's name.

There is also a growing trend in Tamil Nadu to expand initials in ways that align with how names sound in the Tamil language. For example, some choose to expand names phonetically, such as "Pala. Karuppiah" instead of "P. Karuppiah," or "Pa. Ranjith" rather than "P. Ranjith," to reflect a closer approximation of the name in Tamil.

In the academic and professional world, scientists like M. Annadurai expand their names to "Mayilsami Annadurai," though it would be inappropriate to address him by his father's name, Mayilsami. Instead, he is referred to by his given name, Annadurai, underscoring the unique flexibility and personalization that Tamil Nadu's naming conventions allow.

This evolution in Tamil naming practices highlights both the influence of social justice reforms and the cultural adaptability within the state. While Tamil Nadu has largely moved away from caste-based surnames, the naming system retains a focus on individual identity, free from rigid lineage-based structures, distinguishing it from other Indian states.

While the usage of caste names as surnames/last names is discouraged (but not banned) in Tamil Nadu, such usage by out-of-state people is greeted with indifference. So, Lakshmi Menon, Shilpa Shetty, etc. are referred by their preferred names which include their caste names. Likewise, old Tamil names with the caste in them are also fully used while referring to them such as Pasumpoan Muthuramalinga Thevar, U.Ve. Swaminatha Iyer, V.O Chidambaram Pillai etc.

To further reinforce Tamil Nadu's efforts in promoting social equality through its naming conventions, the Madras High Court recently directed the removal of community and caste names from government school names across the state. This move aligns with the state's long-standing policies to reduce caste-based distinctions in public life, including naming practices. The court's decision reflects the state's dedication to social justice by eliminating caste markers, particularly in institutions that shape young minds. This legal step ensures that the caste system is not perpetuated through the education system, aligning with the larger movement that has shaped Tamil Nadu's approach to names and identity over the past century.

This final ruling serves as an important reminder of the state's commitment to dismantling caste-based identity and promoting a more egalitarian social structure, further cementing Tamil Nadu's unique position in its approach to names, identity, and social justice.

In Andhra Pradesh and Telangana, the naming pattern is a family name, given name and caste name in that order, but sometimes the caste name is omitted. If a name appears like Alugupally Sudhir Reddy, Alugupally is the family name, Sudhir is the given name and Reddy is the caste name. If you find a name like Gorle Sunil Kumar, Gorle is the family name, and Sunil Kumar the given name. Here, the caste name is omitted. Of late, some people are writing their names in the order of given name, caste name, and family name. Sometimes, the caste name is omitted here too. It can be seen in names like Satyanarayana Bandi, where Satyanarayana is the given name, and Bandi the family name.

In Maharashtra, Karnataka, Sindh and Gujarat, a very common convention among the Hindu communities is to have the patronymic as the middle name. Examples:

- First Deputy Prime Minister and first Home Minister Sardar Vallabhbhai Patel's full name is Vallabhbhai Jhaverbhai Patel, where Jhaverbhai is his father's given name.
- Cricketer Sachin Tendulkar's full name is Sachin Ramesh Tendulkar, where Ramesh is his father's given name.
- Cricketer Sunil Gavaskar's full name is Sunil Manohar Gavaskar, where Manohar is his father's given name. Sunil Gavaskar's son Rohan Gavaskar would be Rohan Sunil Gavaskar, and so on.
- India's 15th Prime Minister Narendra Modi famously took the oath of office as the Prime Minister of India as Narendra Damodardas Modi, wherein Damodardas is his father's given name. He prefers to write his full name, including his father's name as his middle name.

This system works for both boys and girls, except that after marriage, a woman takes her husband's given name as her middle name – her new middle name is no longer a patronymic. East Slavic naming customs are similar, except that the suffix -yevich, -yevna, or something similar is used in a Russian language patronymic.

Indians of the Muslim Isma'ili sect also have patronymic middle names that use the father's first name and the grandfather's first name plus a family name. Someone called "Ramazan Rahim Ali Manji" might call his son "Karim Ramazan Rahim Manji" and his granddaughter might be called "Zahra Karim Ramazan Manji".

===== Indian diaspora =====
Indians in Singapore and Malaysia, particularly those of Tamil descent, often continue the patronymic tradition. This entails having a single given name, followed by son/daughter of, followed by their father's name.

==== Pashtuns ====
Pashtuns have a -zai or -zay suffix meaning "son of", with tribe names being formed over it.

=== Southeast Asia ===
In Malaysia, Singapore and Brunei, ethnic Malays generally follow the Arabic patronymic naming system of given name + bin/binti or son of/daughter of (often abbreviated SO/DO) + father's name. Non-Muslim indigenous Sarawakians use the "anak" in place of bin/binti or SO/DO, "anak" being the Malay word for "child", while indigenous Sabahans may use "bin" or "binti". However, not all Malays use patronymics, in Thailand they have adopted surnames, while in Indonesia they do not usually have either. Tamil Malaysians have this naming system, but they use a/l (anak lelaki) and a/p (anak perempuan) instead, and in some cases, patronymics may be placed first and abbreviated like Indian counterparts.

Singaporean Indians use the abbreviations s/o (son of) or d/o (daughter of), while Malaysian Indians typically use the respective Malay variations "anak lelaki" (abbreviated a/l) or "anak perempuan" (abbreviated a/p). In some cases, individuals may opt to omit the patronymic indicator and abbreviate the patronymic for ease of usage. For example, a former deputy minister of Malaysia Pathmanaban a/l Kunjamboo was more commonly referred to as K. Pathmanaban and veteran Singaporean politicians Shanmugam Kasiviswanathan and Suppiah Dhanabalan went by K. Shanmugam and S. Dhanabalan respectively. The individual may opt not to include "son of" or "daughter of" in their legal name, as in the case of Shanmugam and Dhanabalan.

In Brunei, the ruling family of the monarch uses given name + ibni + father's name instead of using bin/binti.

In Indonesia, there are a number of ethnic groups with different naming systems. The Batak of North Sumatra (Sumatra Utara) give every child the family's name. Sometimes the family's name is prefixed by Huta-, Batu-, etc., but most use Si-, such as Sitanggang, Sihombing, Sibutar-butar, Sinaga, or Sitohang. The family's name is given from the father's family. For example, if the father's name is Boggi Sinaga who married Moetia Siregar then all children will be given the family's name of Sinaga.

In Sunda, a similar cultural rule is used to that of the Batak. The family's name for Sunda is -Wijaya, but that is not true for all Sundanese families.

=== West Asia ===
==== Post-Soviet states ====
There was an adoption of the East Slavic-style patronymic surnames (with patronymic suffix '-ov/-ova') and the use of the patronymic part of the personal name for the peoples of Central Asia and Caucasus. After the dissolution of the Soviet Union the usage of native naming has becoming increasingly common. Example: Arsen Fadzaev: Russian: Арсен Сулейманович Фадзаев, Iron Ossetic: Фадзайти Сулемани фурт Арсен.

===== Armenian =====
The use of patronymics was introduced in Armenia by Russians during the times of the Russian Empire and the Soviet Union. Before that period, the use of patronymics was very limited. Patronymics are usually formed by the addition of "i" ("of", pronounced as ee) to the father's name, e.g. if the father's name is "Armen", the corresponding patronymic would be "Armeni" (of Armen). The Russified version of the same patronymic would be "Armenovich" for males and "Armenovna" for females. After Armenia regained its independence from the Soviet Union in 1991 there was a massive decline in the use of Russified patronymics; nowadays few Armenians use patronymics outside of official contexts.

Many Armenian surnames were once patronymics first used by distant ancestors or clan founders. These are characterized by the suffix "-ian" in Western Armenian, often transliterated as "-yan" in Eastern Armenian. These are appended to the given name, i.e. Kardashian, Asdvadzadourian, Tankian, Hagopian, Khachadourian, Mardirosian, Bedrosian, Sarkissian, etc. Note that the suffix "-ian" was also appended to trades, as in Adakhtsakordzian (issued from the carpenter), Chalian (issued from the candlemaker), Darbinian (issued from the smith).

Of particular note are the surnames of the children of married priests, or kahanas. Though not as common nowadays, it was customary for a long time for these children (particularly the sons) to change their last names to the name-in-religion of their father. For example, the son of Ter Bartev ("reverend Bartev") would change his last name to Ter Bartevian.

===== Azerbaijani =====
In Azeri, patronymics are formed through -oğlu (sometimes transliterated as ogly) for males and qızı (often transliterated as gizi or kizi) for females. Before the late 19th–early 20th century, patronymics were used as an essential part of a person's full name, i.e. Sərdar İlyas oğlu ("Sardar, son of Ilyas") and Mina Nebi qızı ("Mina, daughter of Nabi"), since surnames were mostly non-existent before Sovietization (with the exception of the upper and some middle-class families). After surnames were commonly adopted in Azerbaijan in the 1920s, patronymics still remained parts of full names, i.e. Sardar Ilyas oğlu Aliyev ("Sardar Aliyev, son of Ilyas"). Nowadays in Azerbaijan, patronymics sometimes replace surnames in unofficial use. Normally in such case, they are spelled as one word (i.e. Eldar Mammadoğlu, Sabina Yusifqızı). Many Azeri surnames are also derived from Persian-style patronymics ending in -zadeh (Kazimzadeh, Mehdizadeh, etc.). They are found among both Caucasian and Iranian Azeris. However, unlike the former, Azeris in Iran do not generally use patronymics in oglu / qizi. Azeri patronymics are not to be confused with Turkish surnames in -oğlu and Greek surnames in -ογλού (-oglou), which do not have specific female versions and do not reflect names of fathers.

===== Tajikistan =====
Russian-style naming for new names of ethnic Tajiks was officially replaced by the national one in Tajikistan in 2016. Jaloliddin Rakhimov, Deputy Head of the Civil Registry Department of the Ministry of Justice of Tajikistan, stated that a person's surname, according to Tajik national traditions, can be formed from the father's given name or from the root of his surname with the suffixes that form surnames: -i, -zod, -zoda, -on, -yon, -iyon, -yer, -niyo, -far. A person's surname can also be formed from the father's given name or from the root of the father's or mother's surname without the addition of suffixes that form surnames.

==== Semitic cultures ====
A common feature of historical Semitic names is use of a patronymic system. Since ancient times, men and women have been named using this system. This was not limited to any certain region or religion. It was only in the 17th and 18th centuries when laws were put in place in European nations demanded that those of Semitic descent abandoned the patronymic naming scheme in favor of consistent legal surnames. It was only after these laws were ratified that most of the Jews and Muslims in these nations received surnames.

===== Arabic =====
In Arabic, the word ibn (ابن or بن: bin, ben and sometimes ibni and ibnu to show the grammatical case of the noun) is the equivalent of the "-son" suffix discussed above, and bint (بنت) means "daughter of". Thus, for example, Ali ibn ʿAmr means "Ali son of ʿAmr". In Classical Arabic, the word ibn is written as bn between two names, since the case ending of the first name then supplies a vowel. Ibn is often written as b., and bint as bt., in name formulas rendered from Arabic into Roman characters. Thus Hisham ibn al-Kalbi is alternatively written as Hisham b. al-Kalbi. However, the pronunciation bin is dialectal and has nothing to do with either the spelling or pronunciation in Classical Arabic. The word Abu (Aba or Abi in different grammatical cases) means "father of", so Abu ʿAli is another name for ʿAmr. In Northwest Africa, the patronymic is romanized as ben, reflecting local pronunciation. See for example Ahmed Ben Bella (أحمد بن بلّة) and Ben Ali (بن علي).

In medieval times, an illegitimate child of unknown parentage would sometimes be termed ibn Abihi, "son of his father" (notably Ziyad ibn Abihi). In the Qur'an, Jesus (Isa in Arabic) is consistently termed Isa ibn Maryam – a matronymic (in the Qur'an, Jesus has no father; see Jesus in Islam). An Arabic patronymic can be extended as far back as family tree records will allow: thus, for example, Ibn Khaldun gave his own full name as Abd ar-Rahman ibn Muhammad ibn Muhammad ibn Muhammad ibn al-Hasan ibn Muhammad ibn Jabir ibn Muhammad ibn Ibrahim ibn ʿAbd ar-Rahman ibn Khaldun.

Patronymics are still standard in parts of the Arab world, notably Saudi Arabia and Iraq (in the case of Iraq, with ibn or bint omitted.) However, some of the Arab world has switched to a family name system. As in English, the new family names are sometimes based on what was formerly a patronymic. The form most used in the Arab world is the usage of both the patronymic and a family name, often using both the father's and paternal grandfathers given name in sequence after the own given name, and then the family name. In Iraq, for example, full names are formed by combining the given name of an individual with the given name of their father (sometimes the father is skipped and the paternal grandfather's given name is used instead, sometimes both father and paternal grandfather are used), along with the town, village, or clan name. For instance, Hayder Karar Hussein al-Mousawi is named Hayder, the son of Karrar, the grandson of Hussein, and from the family of Mousawi (This is the surname given to the offspring of the Imam Musa al-Kazim). In Saudi Arabia, naming conventions are similar to Iraq's but family names are used much more often.

===== Aramaic =====
In Aramaic, the prefix bar- means "son" and is used as a prefix meaning "son of". In the Bible, Peter is called Bar-Jonah in Matthew 16:17 and Nathanael is possibly called Bartholomew because he is the son of Tolmai (or son of Ptolemy, with "P" being reduced). The titles can also be figurative, for example in Acts 4:36–37 a man named Joseph is called Barnabas meaning "son of consolation". The feminine equivalent, b'rat-, is found in the Targumim.

Mandaean names also often make use of the prefix bar-.

===== Hebrew =====
In the Hebrew patronymic system, commonly used by Jews, the first name is followed by ben- ("son of") or bat- ("daughter of"), and then the father's or mother's name, or both.

===== Assyrian =====
The Assyrians for centuries have used the patronymic bet or bit literally meaning "house" in Assyrian Neo-Aramaic; however, in the context of the name it means "from the house of [the father's name]."

==== Persian ====
In Persian, patronymics پَسوَند are formed by names ending with the suffix "-pur" پور for men and "-dokht" دُخت for women. For example: Shahpur (son of king) and Sinapur (son of Sina). Depending on country, some suffixes are more common than others. For example, in Iran, the suffix "-pur" is common while in Afghanistan, the suffix "-Zadah" زاده or "-Zad" زاد is common, although --Zadeh is common in Iran.

==== Kurdish ====
In Kurdish Language, generally, a triple name system is used which is patronymic and avonymic. That is the name of the individual followed by the father's name and the paternal grandfather's name without any modification of the names and are completely gender neutral. This style of naming is used in all official documentation in the Iraqi Kurdistan Region. Surnames are not officially used and most people do not even have a surname or family name, those who do, they usually derive their surnames from the name of their place of birth, place of origin, clan or tribe names, etc. The Kurdish names in Turkey, Iran and Syria are heavily influenced by the official naming systems in the respective countries.

=== Europe ===
In Europe, patronyms were formerly widespread but later became confined to Scandinavia, Iceland, and some Eastern Slavic cultures.

==== Scandinavia ====
In Scandinavia, patronyms were derived from the father's name, followed by -son (Swedish) or -sen for men and -dotter (Swedish and Icelandic) or -datter (Danish and Norwegian) for women. In Swedish the father's name is also followed by a genitive -s, thus the double s in e.g. Johansson, Andersson. Around the turn of the 20th century, patronyms were transformed into family names that were inherited from generation to generation, ending with -son or -sen for both men and women.

==== English ====
In England, names ending with the suffix "-son" or "-ing" were often originally patronymic. In addition, the archaic French (more specifically, Norman) prefix fitz (cognate with the modern French fils, meaning "son") appears in England's aristocratic family lines dating from the Norman Conquest, and also among the Anglo-Irish. Thus there are names such as Fitzgerald, Fitzmaurice and Fitzhugh. In addition, the name Fitzroy, meaning "son of [the] king" (Norman: roy), was sometimes used by illegitimate royal children.

==== Irish, Scottish, and Manx ====
The use of "Mac" in some form was prevalent in Scottish Gaelic, Irish, and Manx, in all of which it denotes "son". "Mc" is also a frequent anglicisation in both Scotland and Ireland. In Ireland, the forms "Mag" and "M'" are encountered. The prefix "Mac" is used to form a patronym, such as "Mac Coinnich"—or the anglicized "Mackenzie"—son of Coinneach/Kenneth. The female equivalent of Mac is Nic, condensed from nighean mhic (in Scottish Gaelic) or iníon mhic (in Irish), both meaning daughter. For example, the Scottish Gaelic surname, Nic Dhòmhnaill meaning "daughter of a son of Dòmhnall" (in English, Donald), as in Mairi Nic Dhòmhnaill, or Mary MacDonald.

At the north end of the Irish Sea, in Ulster, the Isle of Man, and Galloway (indeed as far north as Argyll), "Mac" was frequently truncated in speech to /k/. This led to such anglicisations as "Qualtrough" (Son of Walter) and "Quayle" (son of Paul, cf. MacPhail), usually beginning with "C", "K", or "Q". In Ireland, this truncation resulted in surnames such as "Guinness" (son of Aonghus, cf. MacAonghusa), beginning usually in "C" or "G" for patronymics prefixed with Mac, and in "H" (e.g., "Hurley" [descendant of Iarlath, cf. Ua h-Iarfhlatha/O'Hurley]) for surnames prefixed with "O". Colloquial Scottish Gaelic also has other patronymics of a slightly different form for individuals, still in use (for more information please see: Scottish Gaelic personal naming system).

==== Welsh and Cornish ====
Before the 1536 Act of Union, the Welsh did not generally employ surnames, but instead used epithets (e.g. Selyf Sarffgadau, "Selyf the Battle-Serpent"), patronyms (e.g. Rhodri ap Merfyn, "Rhodri son of Merfyn"), and (much less often) matronyms (e.g. Rhodri map Nest, "Rhodri son of Nest") to identify people. The Welsh word for son is mab or map, which was commonly shortened to ab or ap. The middle words ap (before consonants) and ab (before vowels) in medieval Welsh names mean "son" [of a father called]. The rule is not always followed in records.

Welsh, as a P-Celtic language, originally used map or mab instead of the Q-Celtic mac employed in Ireland and Scotland. These were later simplified to the modern Welsh ap and ab. A common practice is to use mab/ab before a father's name beginning with a vowel (e.g., Llywelyn mab Iorwerth), but the two alternative forms are also employed arbitrarily in many sources.

Daughters were indicated by ferch or verch (mutated from merch, "girl, daughter"). Angharad verch Owain would be "Angharad, daughter of Owain".

After the Acts of Union, this led to many Welsh surnames being variants of their father or ancestor's personal name: ap or ab Ieuan often became "Evans"; ap Rhys, "Price"; ap or ab Owain, "Bowen"; ap Hywel, "Powell" or "Howell". In addition to these Anglicised baptismal and official names, patronyms continued to be commonly employed in Welsh until the Industrial Revolution, particularly in the north and west of Wales. Patronyms were sometimes employed within the English names as well by using the father's personal name as the sons' middle name.

Perhaps because Cornwall was legally incorporated into England earlier than Wales was, patronyms (e.g.[m]ap Ros>Rouse, [m]ap Richard>Pritchard, Davies, Evans) are less common there than toponyms (e.g. Tresillian, Trevithick, Nanskeval/Nankeville) and occupational surnames (e.g. An Gof, [An] Gove, (Blacksmith); Helyer (Cornish dialect – possibly a slater or huntsman (helgher)).

==== Dutch ====
In Dutch, patronymics were often used in place of family names or as middle names. Patronymics were composed of the father's name plus an ending -zoon for sons, -dochter for daughters. For instance, Abel Janszoon Tasman is "Abel son of Jan Tasman", and Kenau Simonsdochter Hasselaer: "Kenau, daughter of Simon Hasselaer". In written form, these endings were often abbreviated as -sz. and -dr. respectively e.g. Jeroen Cornelisz. "Jeroen son of Cornelis", or Dirck Jacobsz. The endings -s, -se and -sen were also commonly used for sons and often for daughters too. In the northern provinces, -s, as genitive case, was almost universally used for both sons and daughters. The suffix -x as in "Tacx" or "Hendrix" also denoted the son or daughter of... and is now integrated as a complete name.

Patronymics were common in the Dutch United Provinces until the French invasion in 1795 and subsequent annexation in 1810. As the Netherlands were now a province of France, a registry of births, deaths and marriages was established in 1811, whereupon emperor Napoleon forced the Dutch to register and adopt a distinct surname.

==== French ====
In France, the terms patronyme (lit. 'patronym') and nom patronymique (lit. 'patronymic name') were long used in legislation to designate the family name, meaning that it was inherited from the father. Hence in everyday language, nom de famille (family name, surname) implied the patronym. A legal reform in 2002, replaced occurrences of patronyme and nom patronymique with nom de famille in legal texts, and enabled parents to give their children either or both of their surnames.

The tradition of patronymic lineage is still used among some Canadian descendants of French colonists: in the oral tradition of many Acadians, for example, Marc à Pierre à Gérard (lit. 'Marc of Pierre of Gérard'), means "Marc, son of Pierre, grandson of Gérard".

==== Italian ====
The Italian language used to designate patronymics in formal writing up to 1975 using the preposition di (English of) for a living father and fu (English late) for a deceased one. That is, Mario di Giovanni Rossi meant that Mario Rossi is the son of a living man named Giovanni; Francesco fu Pietro Verdi meant that Francesco Verdi is the son of a deceased man named Pietro. When the father's name was unknown, institutions could use the formula N.N. (Nomen nescio, Latin for "I don't know the name") or use the mother's name or omit this part entirely.

In parish records written in Latin, the father's name would be written in genitive with no preposition. For a deceased father, the particle quondam (English once/formerly) was added. The examples above would have been translated as Marius Johannis Rossi and Franciscus quondam Petri Verdi.

Patronymics are not in common usage in modern Italian. However, some of them have been the source of various surnames. As an example, the individuals descended from a man named Paolo could have gained the patronymic surnames Paolo, Di Paolo, De Paoli, Paoli, Polo, Pagolo, Pagoli, Paolino, Lino, etc.

==== Iberian languages ====
In the past, both in Spanish and Portuguese, the endings -ez and -es tended to be conflated since pronunciation was quite similar in the two languages. Today, Portuguese has been fully standardized to -es; Spanish is also standardized to -ez, but it is very common to see archaic endings in -es. For instance, Pires/Peres and Pérez are the modern equivalents of English "Peterson" in Portuguese and Spanish.

In Portugal, there are some surnames that had a patronymic genesis but, while still common, no longer indicate patronymic usage. For instance, Álvares was the son of Álvaro and Gonçalves was the son of Gonçalo (it was the case of Nuno Álvares Pereira, son of Álvaro and Gonçalves Pereira, son of Gonçalo Pereira). Other cases include Rodrigues (son of Rodrigo), Nunes (son of Nuno) and Fernandes (son of Fernando). In the same way, the surname Soares means son of Soeiro (in Latin Suarius). It comes from Latin Suaricius (son of Suarius); the Latin genitive suffix -icius/a was used to indicate a patronymic. Later it became Suáriz, Suárez (both Spanish), and eventually Soares (Portuguese). Another theory attributes the Iberian -ez style patronymics to Germanic (Visigothic) rather than Latin influence.

Spanish patronyms follow a similar pattern to the Portuguese (e.g., López: son of Lope; Fernández: son of Fernando; Martínez: son of Martín; Rodríguez: son of Rodrigo; Álvarez: son of Álvaro). Common endings include -ez, -az, -iz, -is and -oz. However, not all surnames with similar endings are necessarily patronymic. For example, Chávez is not the son of Chavo, but comes from Galician or Portuguese chaves, meaning "keys", with the "s" denoting the plural form of chave, as is the case of key/keys in English.

However, these kinds of surnames were unusual outside the Crown of Castile. Apart from natural spelling variations (such as using Giménez or Ximénez), modern orthographic standardisation in each Iberian dialect brought a number of crossed versions. It is possible to find the Catalan language politician Jordi Sànchez (whose surname, while Spanish, has a grave accent – characteristic of Catalan – instead of the acute accent used in Spanish) or the journalist Vicenç Sanchis (who spells his surname in a way that is closer to Catalan, but with the ch digraph characteristic of Spanish).

Due to the letters z and s being pronounced alike in Latin American dialects of Spanish, many non-patronymic surnames with an -es have come to be written with an -ez. In Hispano-American Spanish, the -ez spellings of Chávez (Hugo Chávez), Cortez (Alberto Cortez) and Valdez (Nelson Valdez) are not patronymic surnames, but simply variant spellings of the Iberian Spanish spelling with -es, as in the names of Manuel Chaves, Hernán Cortés and Víctor Valdés. For more on the -z surnames in Spanish see Influences on the Spanish language.

A list of some Iberian patronymics:

Original given name	Castilian patronymic	Galician-Portuguese patronymic
Álvaro	Álvarez	Álvares, Alves
Antom, Antão, António	Antúnez	Antunes
Benito, Bento, Bieito	Benítez	Bentes, Bieites, Viéitez
Bermudo, Vermudo	Bermúdez, Vermúdez	Bermudes
Bernardo	Bernárdez	Bernardes
Diego, Diogo	Díaz, Díez, Diéguez	Dias, Diegues
Domingo, Domingos	Domínguez	Domingues
Egaz, Egas	Viegaz	Viegas
Enrique, Henrique	Enríquez	Henriques
Ermígio, Hermígio	Ermíguez	Hermigues
Esteban, Estêvão	Estébanez	Esteves, Estévez
Facundo	Fagúndez	Fagundes
Fáfila, Fávila	Fáfez, Fáfilaz	Fafes, Fáfilas
Fernão, Fernando	Fernández	Fernandes
Froila, Fruela	Fróilaz, Fruelaz	Froilas, Fruelas
García, Garcia	Garcés	Garcês
Geraldo	Geráldez	Geraldes
Godinho, Godím	Godins, Godínez	Godins
Gomes^{1}	Gómez	Gomes
Gonzalo, Gonçalo	González	Gonçalves
Gutier, Gutierre, Guterre²	Gutiérrez	Guterres
Juan, João (from the Latin Ioannes)	Yáñez, Yanes, Ibáñez	Eanes, Anes
Lope, Lopo^{1}	López	Lopes
Marco, Marcos	Márquez	Marques
Martín, Martim, Martinho	Martínez	Martins
Menendo, Mendo, Mem, ^{1}	Menéndez, Méndez	Mendes
Muño, Monio^{1}	Muñoz	Moniz
Nuño, Nuno	Núñez	Nunes
Ordoño, Ordonho	Ordóñez	Ordonhes
Pelayo, Paio^{1}	Peláez, Páez	Paes, Pais
Pero, Pedro	Pérez, Píriz	Peres, Pires
Ramiro	Ramírez	Ramires
Rodrigo	Rodríguez	Rodrigues
Ruy, Rui-Roi³	Ruíz	Ruis, Rois
Sancho	Sánchez	Sanches
Suero, Soeiro^{1}	Suárez	Soares
Tello, Telo	Téllez	Teles
Varão	Varón	Varão
Velasco, Vasco	Velázquez, Vázquez	Vasques, Vaz
Vímara	Vimaránez	Vimaranes, Guimarães
Ximeno, Jimeno, Gimeno, Chemene, Exemeno^{1}	Ximénez, Jiménez, Jimenes, Ximenes, Giménez, Gimenes, Chiménez, Chimenes, Seménez, Semenes, Ximenis, Eiximenis, Scimemi, Scimeni, Chimenz, Jimeno, Eiximinis, Eximenis	Ximenes

1. Archaic given name, not in use.
2. Archaic given name, not in use. Equivalent to the German Gunther.
3. Ruy or Rui is an archaic hypocoristic form of Rodrigo.

==== Norse languages ====
In Norse custom, patronyms and matronyms were formed by using the ending -son (later -søn and -sen in Danish, Norwegian and German) to the genitive form of the father's name to indicate "son of", and -dóttir (Icelandic and Faroese -dóttir, Swedish and Norwegian -dotter, Danish and Norwegian -datter) for "daughter of". The resulting patronymic was generally not used as a surname; however, a third name, a so-called byname based on location or personal characteristic, was often added to differentiate people and could eventually develop into a kind of family name. Some Early Modern examples of the latter practice, where the patronymic was placed after the given name and was followed by the surname, are Norwegian Peder Claussøn Friis, the son of Nicolas Thorolfsen Friis (Claus in Claussøn being short for Nicolas) and Danish Thomas Hansen Kingo, the son of Hans Thomsen Kingo.

Eventually, most Nordic countries replaced or complemented this system with the prevailing "international" standard of inherited family names. In Norway, for example, the parliament passed a family name act in 1923, citing the rising population and the need to avoid the confusion of new last names in every generation. The law does allow a person to retain a patronymic as a middle name in addition to the surname, as was common in Early Modern times; this is not a common practice but does occur, a modern example being Audhild Gregoriusdotter Rotevatn. The Danish government outlawed the practice in 1856 and eased the regulations in 1904 to deal with the limited number of patronymics. In Sweden the practice of children keeping their father's and wives taking their husband's patronymic as a surname occurred in the 18th century but was first prevalent in the late 19th century. Patronymics were normal in Sweden, at least in rural Sweden, until the 19th century. From the end of the 19th-century patronymics gradually became less common in Sweden until they were abolished in 1966. In 1982 the right to use patronyms (and matronyms) was partially restored; a person (or the parents of a child) had to apply and pay a fee. From 1 July 2017 parents in Sweden are free to give their children patronyms/matronyms at birth instead of inherited family names, and any person can change their last name to a matronymic or patronymic.

Matronyms were used exceptionally if the child was born out of wedlock, or if the mother was much more high-born or well-known than the father, a historical example being Sweyn Estridsson.

In Iceland, patronymics or matronymics are still used as last names, and this is, in fact, required by law, with a handful of exceptions. For almost all cases, the father's name (usually in the genitive case) is used, plus the word son for sons or dóttir for daughters. For example, Jóhanna Sigurðardóttir (i.e. "Jóhanna, daughter of Sigurð[ur]"). People who do not identify as male or female (nonbinary people) can also use the suffix -bur, which means "child of".

In 2022, the Swedish Tax Agency denied a Gotland woman's application to change her surname to one with the Gutnish ending -dotri (instead of -dotter) on the grounds that it did not follow Swedish conventions. The administrative court in Stockholm decided in her favour on appeal, with the Tax Agency in turn taking the case to the Court of Appeal; in early 2023, the Court of Appeal finally ruled that she was allowed to use a Gutnish surname.

==== Finnish ====
In Finland, the use of patronymics was a result of relatively-recent Swedish influence and remained uncommon outside official documents. It was only in the 19th century that the use of patronymics gained any sort of popularity among the Finnish-speaking lower classes. Family names became obligatory in Finland by law in 1920.

Historically, patronymics were composed in Swedish fashion: the father's name and the suffix -n for genitive plus the word poika for sons, tytär for daughters. For example, Tuomas Abrahaminpoika means "Tuomas, Abraham's son", and Martta Heikintytär means "Martta, Heikki's daughter".

==== Bulgarian ====
In Bulgarian, the patronymics are -ov / -ev for men and -ova / -eva for women. They are identical to the endings of family names in Bulgarian and some other Slavic family names, such as those in Russian and Czech. In Bulgarian official documents, the patronymic comes before the surname, so Ivan Marinov Yordanov means Ivan, son of Marin, Yordanov and Ivana Marinova Yordanova would be Ivana, daughter of Marin, Yordanova. This may be confusing because Marinov is a patronymic surname, and "Ivan Marinov" is an incomplete name (i.e., without surname).

==== Georgian ====
In Georgian, patronymics, when used, add s to the end of the father's name, followed by dze for a man and asuli for a woman. For example, Joseph Stalin's original name was Ioseb Besarionis Dze Jugashvili. After the end of the Soviet Union, patronymics in Georgia have become disused as a Russian tradition.

Georgian family names derive mostly from patronymics, nicknames and places of origin. Two common elements, dze and shvili, mean "son of" and "child", respectively.

==== Greek ====
Most Greek surnames are patronymics by origin albeit in various forms depending on the ancestral locality. Diminutive suffixes that denote "son of" or, more generally, "descendant of" start with the given name such as Δημήτριος Dēmétrios and then have the patronymic surname such as Dēmētrópoulos (Peloponnese), Dēmētrákos (Laconia), Dēmētréas (Messenian Mani), Dēmētrátos (Cephalonia), Dēmētrákēs (Crete), Dēmētriádēs/Dēmētr-ídēs (Pontus, Asia Minor), Dēmētréllēs (Lesbos), Dēmétroglou (Asia Minor) (identical to Turkish patronym -oğlu), or simply Dēmētríou (especially common in Cyprus, with the first name in the genitive) are formed. The same principle can apply to surnames deriving from professions. For example, as from παπάς, papás "priest", are derived the surnames Papadópoulos, Papadákos, Papadéas, Papadátos, Papadákēs, Papadéllēs, Papazoglou etc., all of which signify a "priest's son". The same principle(s) may apply in combination: Papanikoláou, Papanikolópoulos, "the son of the priest Nikolaos". A daughter's family name is the same as the son's but is always declined in the genitive: Dēmētropoúlou, Papanikoláou.

In addition to those surnames, actual patronymics are used in official documents as "middle names" preceding the surname. For example, the children of a Ioánnis Papadópoulos can be María Ioánnou Papadopoúlou and Andréas Ioánnou Papadópoulos (Ioánnou is the genitive of Ioánnis). Traditionally, a married woman would adopt her husband's family name. Now, however, women in Greece can keep their own surnames if they choose.

==== Hungarian ====
In Hungarian, patronyms were traditionally formed with the ending -fi (sometimes spelled as -fy or -ffy). That system is no longer in common use, but traces can still be found in some frequent current surnames such as Pálfi (son of Paul), Győrfi, Bánfi or Sándor Petőfi (a famous poet who chose the Hungarian form instead of his Slavic birth name, Petrovics). In the Old Hungarian period (10th–16th century, see History of Hungarian), surnames were not in common use, and the full genitive was represented as in Péter fia András (Peter's son Andrew). Such forms are in frequent use in charters and legal documents from that time. In Hungarian, the surname precedes the given name.

==== Romanian ====
In Romanian, the endings -escu and -eanu were used, as in Petrescu, 'son of Petre (Peter)'; many modern Romanian family names were formed from such patronymics. Less commonly, matronymics formed with the genitive form (using the prefix a-) were used, as in Amariei, '(son/daughter) of Maria'.

==== Russian ====
In Russian the endings -ovich, -evich and -ich are used to form patronymics for men. For women, the respective endings are -ovna, -yevna or -ichna. For example, in Russian, a man named Ivan with a father named Nikolay would be known as Ivan Nikolayevich or "Ivan, son of Nikolay" (Nikolayevich being a patronymic). Likewise, a woman named Lyudmila with a father named Nikolay would be known as Lyudmila Nikolayevna or "Lyudmila, daughter of Nikolay" (Nikolayevna being a patronymic). For masculine names ending in a vowel, such as Ilya or Foma, when they are used as a base for the patronymic, the corresponding endings are -ich (for men) and -inichna (for women). Examples in titles of classical Russian literature include The Tales of the Late Ivan Petrovich Belkin, The Death of Ivan Ilyich and The Tale of How Ivan Ivanovich Quarreled with Ivan Nikiforovich.

In Russia, the patronymic is an official part of the name, used in all official documents, and when addressing somebody both formally and among friends. The correct written order of a full name is surname, given name, then patronymic – this order would be found on official documents, business cards, and formal addresses. For example, a woman named Mariya Iosifovna Zhukova would hand you a business card that says Zhukova Mariya Iosifovna. Use of the given name followed by the patronymic in Russian is always the neutral, correct and polite way to address any person except close friends, family members, or children – in such cases usage of the patronymic adds humorous intonation of exaggerated but well-meant respect. This form would be congruent to the Western use of Mr. and the surname for the polite and proper use and reference. Instead of schoolchildren calling their teacher Ms. and surname, the proper form would be given name and patronymic. For example, a teacher named Anna Borisovna Kopylova would always be called Anna Borisovna by her pupils. When addressing a much younger person, only the first name is commonly used, except for the cases when the younger person is of higher rank of society and/or asserts some kind of authority (for example, 24-year-old figure skater Sofia Samodurova would normally be called Sofia Vyacheslavovna because she also works as a coach). Individuals are addressed by their given name followed by the patronymic (e.g., "Mikhail Nikolayevich") in many situations including on formal occasions, by colleagues at work, by acquaintances, or when being addressed by someone younger in age. It is becoming more common for younger individuals (under 50) to drop the patronymic at work. In informal situations, if a person is called by a diminutive (such as Misha for Mikhail or Nastya for Anastasia), the patronymic is not used.

In colloquial, informal speech, it is also possible to contract the ending of a patronymic: thus Nikolayevich becomes Nikolaich, and Stepan Ivanovich becomes Stepan Ivanych or simply Ivanych as the given name may be omitted altogether. In this case, the contraction, if possible, is obligatory: Ivan Sergeyevich Sidorov may be called "Sergeich" or, more rarely, "Sergeyevich". In contrast to male names, if a woman is called by her patronymic name without a given name, the patronymic is usually not contracted: "Ivanovna" but "Mar' Ivanna"; "Sergeyevna" or "Sergevna" is one exception, where both forms are fine. Typically, a patronymic name alone is a familiar form of addressing an older female.

==== Serbian ====
Vuk Karadžić reported in the 19th century that Serbs sometimes used their old family names, and sometimes patronymics. Vuk Karadžić himself used patronymic “Stefanović” (son of Stefan, equivalent of Steven), and sometimes Karadžić, old family name. However, nowadays, the patronymic names in Serbia are mostly used on legal documents, and have the form of the father's name that says the child is 'of so and so'... example: Marija Dragoljuba Pavlović, where Dragoljub is the father's name and 'Dragoljuba' literally means 'of Dragoljub'. There are also other forms, like to include – the father's name – in brackets: Maria (Dragoljub) Pavlović.

It became more common to include the name of any one of the parents in legal documents ('ime jednog roditelja') – in practice this is usually still the father's name.

In Serbia, Croatia and Bosnia, the patronymic names do not change form between masculine and feminine. Example: Marija Dragoljuba Pavlović (Dragoljub is the father's name; Dragoljuba is the form that says she is his daughter or literally 'of Dragoljub'). However, in the past, unmarried Serbian women's surnames ended in -eva, while married Serbian women's surnames ended in -ka.

==== Turkish ====
In Turkish, the suffixes used to indicate paternal ancestry are -oğlu and -zade, which indicate the ancestry as coming from a certain man. Like many other patronymics in other languages, with the formalization of naming conventions by laws in the late modern contemporary age many turned into surnames. After the 'Surname revolution' in 1934, many people chose professions or habitat as surnames with or without the suffix -oğlu, such as Elbeyioğlu, Bakkaloğlu or Giritlioğlu and with -zade such as Beyzade, Mehmedzade, Yusufzade.

==== Ukrainian ====
In Ukrainian, the female patronymic always ends with -івна (-ivna) or -ївна (-yivna). The male patronymic always ends with -ович (-ovych) or -йович (-yovych). Exception: Illia (Ілля) → Illich (Ілліч) (e.g. Illia Illich Mechnikov), Sava (Сава) → Savych (Савич), Yakiv (Яків) → Yakovych (Якович).

Patronyms are part of the full name and are obligatory in formal messages. They are frequent in common speech, such as to address a person in a respectful manner (by using the name, followed by the patronym) and to accent an informal message in formal environments, as between colleagues with good relationships at work (by using the patronym with neither the given name nor the family name).

== See also ==
- Filiation
- Matronymic
- Toponymic surname
