= Cornish surnames =

Cornish surnames are surnames used by Cornish people and often derived from the Cornish language such as Jago, Trelawney or Enys. Others have strong roots in the region and many in the UK with names such as Eddy, Stark or Rowe are likely to have Cornish origins. Such surnames for the common people emerged in the Middle Ages, although the nobility probably had surnames much earlier on. Not until the later Middle Ages did it become necessary for a common man to have a surname. Most surnames were fully established throughout Cornwall by the end of the 15th century. Cornish surnames can be found throughout the world as part of the Cornish diaspora.

Due to the linguistic similarity of Cornish, Welsh and Breton, some surnames can derive from any of the three regions.

== Patronymics ==
The most common surnames in Cornwall are derived from patronymics, the father's first name being taken either without alteration, for example 'John', or with the addition of genitive '-s' or, typically Cornish, '-o', e.g. 'Bennetto' or '-y' as in 'Pawley'.

== Cornish surnames deriving from the Cornish language ==
=== Placenames ===
The phrase Tre, Pol and Pen is used to describe people from, or places in, Cornwall, the United Kingdom. Carew has By Tre, Pol and Pen / You shall know the Cornishmen; however, Camden records the rhyme as By Tre, Ros, Pol, Lan, Caer and Pen / You may know the most Cornishmen.

- Tre – a settlement or homestead
- Ros(e) – heath, moor
- Pol – a pond, lake or well
- Lan – a religious enclosure
- Car – either from karn "tor" or ker "hill-fort"
- Pen(n), Pedn – a hill or headland

Many Cornish surnames and place names still retain these words as prefixes, such as the names Trelawny or Trevithick and the towns of Polperro, Polkerris and of course Penzance. "Carbines" derives from karn byghan "little tor".

Caution should be exercised with the derivation of "Car-" surnames as there seems also to be fusion with names containing the word ker "hill-fort", as in "Carvosso" ker fosow "walled hill-fort", a placename found in Ludgvan. There is also karrek "rocky". "Rosdew" is ros du "black moor" and "Ros(e)warne" from ros (g)wern "alder heath" or perhaps "heath by an alder-marsh". "Landry" means lan dre "enclosure of farmhouse or church-house".

Other examples of place-names used as surnames:

- Gwavas" gwavos "winter residence or bothy"- an area near Penzance and also the surname of a well-known Cornish family (William Gwavas)
- Hammett: "summer bothy"; from Old Cornish hav bot (Cornish: havos, Welsh: hafod). In East Cornwall, -m- was the Anglo-Saxon representation of the Cornish nasal -v-. Place-names: Hammett, Hammett Down in the parish of Quethiock; Great Hammett, Little Hammett in the parish of St Neot, Cornwall.
- Tremethyk: tre medhyk "doctor's residence or farm"
- Trenowden: Tre Renowden "Renowden's farm"; Renowden is the Cornish form of Renaud or Reginald
- Trengrouse: Tre an Grows, "farm at the cross"
- Penprase: Penn Pras "head of the meadow or common pasture"
- Penrose: Penn Ros(e) "head of the moor"
- Solomon: St Colomb Man From St Columb
- Nan(s)- surnames- there are many Nan(s)- surnames in Cornwall, "nan(s)" meaning valley- for example Nankervis from "nans" and "kervys", meaning "valley of the deer/stag" and Nankivell/Nancekivell "nans" "Cyfel", "the valley of Cyfel" (Cyfel being a personal name) or perhaps from the Old Welsh/Cornish word "ceffyl" a "horse". Nanskeval is located on the parish boundaries of St Mawgan in Pydar and St Columb Major.

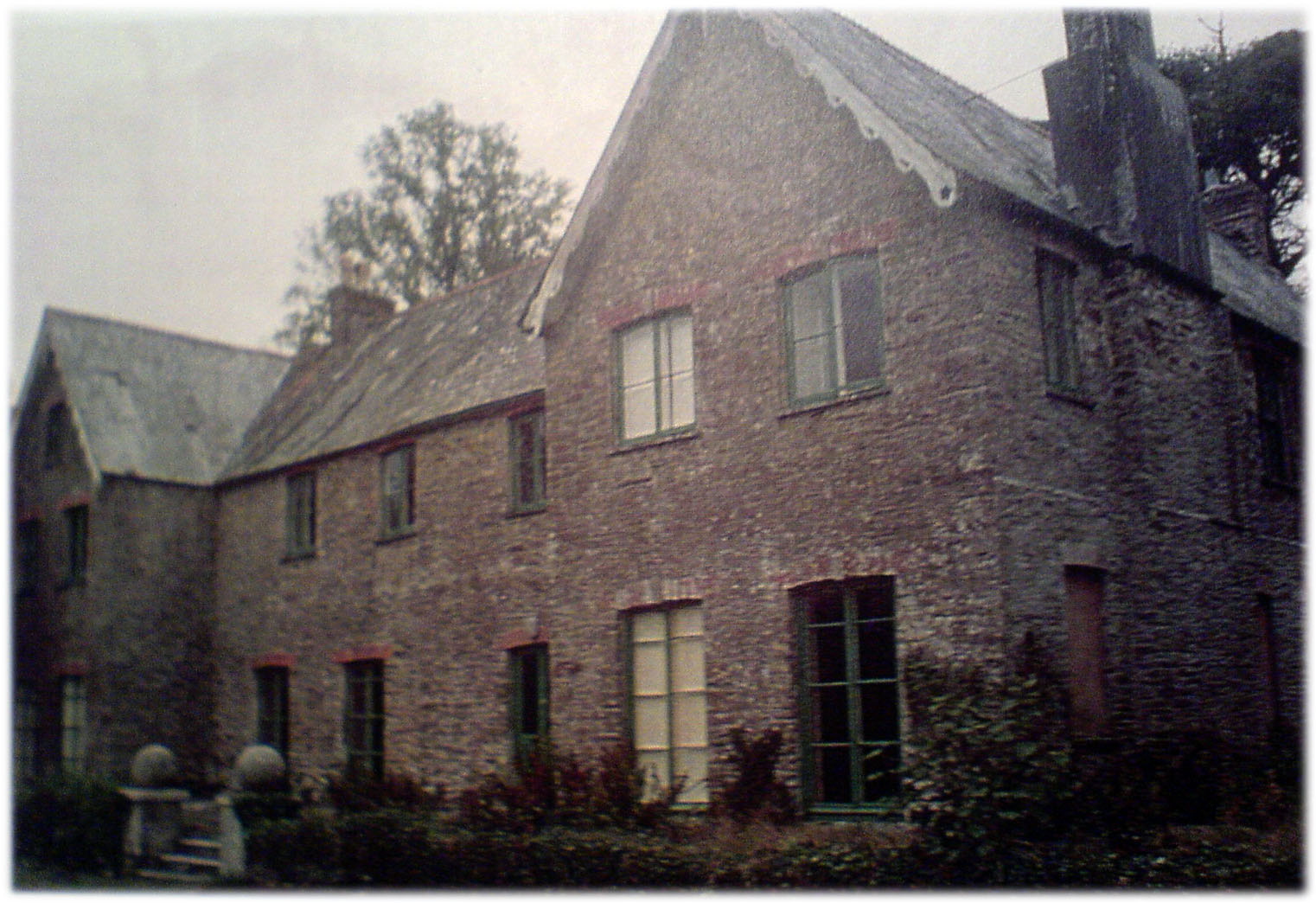
Nanskeval house at St Mawgan in Pydar, Cornwall. A possible location whence the surname originated

=== Trades ===
As in many other parts of Europe, names were used to describe the occupation of the head of the family; "Angove" (Cornish: an Gov "the Smith"), for example, being the equivalent to the Irish Gowan, Scottish Gow, Breton "Le Goff", "Legoff", "Legoffic", English "Smith", German "Schmidt", Polish "Kowalski", and Italian "Ferrero". Other examples of names derived from trades include "Dyer" (Cornish: tior "thatcher") and "Helyer" (Cornish: helghyer "hunter"), both of which can be found in English too, i.e. "Thatcher" and "Hunter" respectively, while Dyer itself is also English for someone who dyes clothing.

Other examples:

- Marrak: Cornish: marghek "horseman, cavalier, knight"
- Gloyn(e): Cornish: glowbrenn "charcoal", perhaps from the ancient profession of a charcoal burner
- Southcott: Cornish: Sothdyji "South Sheep Cot", derived by the family's legacy of sheep farming in Cornwall

=== Animals ===
Some surnames were derived from animals which may indicate that the bearer of some of these surnames may have made a living from hunting, examples include Bligh "wolf" (Cornish: blydh) and Coon "hounds" (Cornish: keun).

Gwinnel: possibly from Cornish: gwennel "swallow"; it also refers to a weaver's shuttle

=== Festivals ===
At least one known Cornish surname derives from the name of a festival, namely "Pascoe" from "Easter".

=== Personal characteristics or nicknames ===
Another category of surnames is derived from personal characteristics or nicknames/hypocoristics. e.g. "Coad" (Cor.coth=old), "Couch" (Cor.cough=red) and "Tallack" (Cor.talek=wide-browed).

Other examples:

- Teague te(k)g- from Cornish "fair" or "beautiful"
- Gwyn(n)- from Cornish "gwy(d)n" "white"

=== The surname Cornish ===
The surname "Cornish" with variants "Cornysshe", "Cornyshe", "Cornysh", "Cornishe", "Cornisshe", and "Cornis"- standardised as "Cornish"- is to be found throughout Great Britain and Ireland. This name seems to originate from a time when ordinary people were still not using surnames in the modern way. A native Cornishman who had left Cornwall for another part of Britain or Ireland was given the name "Cornish", i.e. the Cornishman. In "A Dictionary of British Surnames", P.H. Reaney (1976), the following entries and dates are to be found:

- Cornish, Cornes, Badekoc Korneys (1296)
- John Corneys (1327)
- Henry Cornysh (1375)

The first recorded instance is in the National Dictionary in 1547. It is likely that the Adam Corneys recorded in 1300 is identical to Adam Le Cornwalais recorded in 1275. Other related names to Cornish that designate a Cornish origin include "Cornwall", "Cornwell", "Cornick", "Curnow", "Cornu", "Kernew", "Kernow" etc. (although Cornick may have other origins as well). In previous centuries these names may have alternated along with "Cornwallis" and "Le Cornwalais".

=== "Welsh" names ===
Especially in West Cornwall, many names typically associated with Welsh are also found. In the Cornish language, ultimately a language linked to Welsh and Breton, the prefix 'map' may have been used, as in Welsh, to indicate the relationship of father to son, this later becoming "ap" (as in NW Breton area, Leon dialect, Breton WP) and then finally the "p" alone being prefixed to the name, e.g. (m)ap Richard becoming "Pri(t)chard". Another feature of these patronymics was the diminutive suffix "-kin" being added the father's first name e.g. "Tonkin", which may derive from either Anthony or Thomas.

- Prowse/Prouse from "map" "ros" meaning "son of the heath"
- Prynne "map" "Ryn", "son of Rynne"

Surnames found at high frequencies in both Wales and Cornwall include:

- Davies
- Williams
- Evans
- Jones
- Morgan

== Anglicised names and folk etymology ==
Owing to the gradual language shift in Cornwall from the native Cornish language to English, approximately until the mid-18th century, some Cornish language surnames underwent change through folk etymology. The Cornish meaning of the name was no longer understood and so it was changed into a similar-sounding English word, not necessarily anything to do with the original meaning in Cornish. The same process has been noted in Cornish placenames too. One example of this process regarding surnames is the surname "Kneebone" which actually derives from the Cornish "Carn Ebwen" or the "tomb", "carn" of "Ebwen". The change must have occurred at a point when the original "k" at the beginning of the English word was still pronounced and thus suggests an early period in which it was anglicised.

== Non-Cornish language surnames typically associated with Cornwall ==
There are also many names typically found in Cornwall that may have a completely non-Cornish language origin, excluding those names taken from English, yet a strong association with the area. These names reflect the historical connections between Cornwall and Brittany and also the Norman occupation of Cornwall. The Normans themselves employed Bretons in the administration of Cornwall and thus "imported" Breton names in Cornwall are not unusual.

- Arundell – the name of an aristocratic family in Cornwall.
- Arscott – possibly from Breton "harscoet" meaning "iron shield"
- Briton, Brittan etc. – from "Breton", a name given to a Breton resident in Cornwall
- Ferris – Of Scots origin, commonly found in the Restormel and Carrick areas.
- Grylls – Of English origin, an important family in south-east Cornwall in the seventeenth century
- Orchard
- Kendall - Of Norman English origin, an established gentry family occupying the manors of Pelyn and Treworgy who have resided in Cornwall since the fourteenth century.
- Rowe – of Norman origin, the name became popular in the region following large-scale Norman settlement. It remains a common surname in Cornwall.
- Tangye – of Breton origin.

== Famous persons with Cornish surnames ==
Not all people who consider themselves Cornish have a necessarily Cornish surname nor do all Cornish surname bearers necessarily identify themselves as Cornish.

- Hector Bolitho
- Warren Carne
- Kristin Chenoweth
- Keith Chegwin
- Kenneth Kendall
- Samuel Langhorne Clemens aka Mark Twain
- John Denzel
- John Pascoe Fawkner
- Guy Penrose Gibson
- Kirk Hammett
- Dashiell Hammett
- Sue Menhenick
- Cam Nancarrow
- Jack Nance
- John Nance Garner
- Richard Nancekivell
- John Pasco
- Francis Polkinghorne Pascoe
- Beverly Penberthy
- Edward William Wynne Pendarves
- David Penhaligon
- Charles Penrose
- Sir Roger Penrose
- Rick Rescorla
- Mike Teague
- Sir Jonathan Trelawny, 3rd Baronet
- Arthur Tremayne
- Henry Trengrouse
- Marcus Trescothick
- John Trevaskis
- Sir Charles Trevelyan, 1st Baronet
- Richard Trevithick
- Colin Trevorrow
- John Courtenay Trewin

== See also ==
- Baragwanath
- Bolitho
- Chenoweth
- Category:Cornwall-related biographical lists
- English surnames
- Hypocoristic
- List of people from Cornwall
- Nankivell (surname)
- Nickname
- Normans
- Pascoe
- Patronymics
- Welsh surnames

== Specialist bibliography ==
- Charnock, Richard Stephen: Patronymica Cornu-Britannica: Or, The Etymology of Cornish Surnames. London: Longmans, Green, Reader and Dyer 1870, ISBN 9781165533398
- Gover, J. E. B., The Place Names of Cornwall (1948)
- Jackson, Kenneth, Language and History in Early Britain, Cambridge, Mass.: Harvard University Press (1953)
- Padel, O. J., Cornish Place-Name Elements, Nottingham: English Place-name Society (1985)
- Reaney, P. H., A Dictionary of British Surnames, (2nd ed. 1976), London: Routledge.
- White, George Pawley, A Handbook of Cornish Surnames, Camborne: Chy'nelyn, Tregenna La., (1972)
