= Kudi Arasu =

Tamil weekly magazine in India (1925-49)

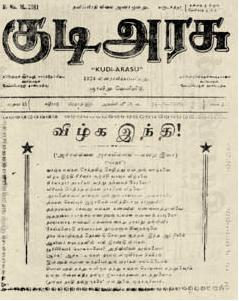
Front page of Kudi Arasu (3 September 1939). The headline reads "Veezhga Indhi" (Down with Hindi) during Anti-Hindi agitation of 1937-40

Kudi Arasu (also pronounced as Kudiyarasu; English: Republic) was a Tamil weekly magazine published by Periyar E. V. Ramasamy in Madras Presidency (present-day Tamil Nadu) in India.

== History ==
Periyar started Kudi Arasu on 2 May 1925 in Erode with K. M. Thangaperumal pillai as the editor. Its initial publications were issued weekly on Sunday with 16 pages at a cost of one anna. In November 1925, Periyar quit the Indian National Congress after his failed attempt to bring reservation for non-Brahmins in educational institutions and government jobs. S. Ramanathan who founded Self Respect Movement in 1921 along with like minded friends, invited EVR to spearhead the Self-Respect Movement to propagate self-respect among Indians, especially Tamils. The magazine became the mouthpiece of the movement. The magazine circulated in the Tamil diaspora, for which Thamizhavel G. Sarangapani played a prominent role. It had Periyar's wife Nagammai, his sister Kannammal and his brother E. V. Krishnasamy as the publisher for a period of time when he was on tour or arrested. It ceased publication on 5 November 1949.

== Publications ==
Periyar wrote several articles on women's rights, on atheism and against the caste system. Others like M. Singaravelu wrote many articles on socialism.

In an editorial dated 29 March 1931, Periyar criticised Mahatma Gandhi for Bhagat Singh's death. He wrote,

There is no one who has not condoled the death of Mr. Bhagat Singh by hanging. There is none who has not condemned the government for hanging him. Besides, we now see several people known as patriots and national heroes scolding Mr. Gandhi for the happening of this event.

The Madras government of the British Raj banned the magazine at several occasions for various reasons including sedition and for propagating communism. In 1935, the Tamil version of Why I am an Atheist was banned, and translator P. Jeevanandham and publisher E.V. Krishnasamy were arrested.

== In recent times ==
In 2010, works from between 1925 and 1938 were reproduced and published as books.
