= Nankivell Observatory =

Astronomical observatory in New Zealand

Coordinates: 41.0997535°S 175.5786737°E

Nankivell Observatory, named after the late Garry Nankivell, a master optical craftsman, is situated in the Wairarapa, New Zealand. It is to become incorporated into the Matariki Research Observatory, now under development by members of the Phoenix Astronomical Society (NZ) (PAS).

The Nankivell Observatory houses an 8" Schmidt Camera with a 6" guide refractor built by Garry Nankivell.
