= Religious views of Periyar =

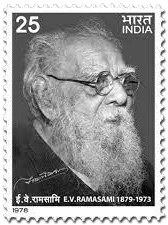
E V Ramasami

The religious views of Periyar E. V. Ramasamy involved opposition to religion virulently because, in his views, the so-called men of religion invented myths and superstitions to keep the innocent and ignorant people in darkness and to go on exploiting them. He was an atheist and a rationalist in his own right. Periyar had been a harsh critic of Brahminical Hinduism in Tamil Nadu. He criticized some elements of Islam, Buddhism and Christianity, but has mostly spoken appreciatively of these faiths, finding in their ethics principles of equality and justice, thus advocating them if they can prove an alternative to Brahamanic Hinduism. With regards to institutionalized religion being used for personal gain, Periyar stated that "religion goes hand in hand with superstition and fear. Religion prevents progress and suppresses man. Religion exploits the suppressed classes." As religions, however they are prone to be hit by accusation of superstition, exploitation and irrationalism.

== Hinduism ==
In Periyar's school of thought, there was no religion by name Vedic Hinduism derived from the name of a place. With no distinct doctrines and no particular sacred book, it was said to be an imaginary religion preaching the superiority of the Brahmin the inferiority of the Shudra, and the untouchability of the Panchama.

Maria Misra compares him to the philosophes,

"His contemptuous attitude to the baleful influence of Hinduism in Indian public life is strikingly akin to the anti-Catholic diatribes of the enlightenment philosophes."

Through the Self-Respect Movement, Periyar preached that compared to other religions, Hinduism placed many restrictions on men by prohibiting all except a small minority of Brahmins from reading the religious texts or discussing religious matters and by evolving a caste system in the name of divine law, and by creating several gods and festivals to provide an assured income and prosperity to the small Brahmin group at the expense of all others.

Regarding Mahatma Gandhi's views on Hinduism and Hindu Varnashramadharma, Periyar wrote: "The day when Gandhi said God alone guides him, that Varnashramadharma is superior system fit to govern the affairs of the world and that everything happens according to God's will, we came to the conclusion that there is no difference between Gandhism and Brahminism. We also concluded unless the Congress party that subscribes to such philosophy and principle is abolished it will not be good to the country. But now this fact has been found out at least by some of the people. They have gained wisdom and courage to call for the downfall of Gandhism. This is a great victory to our cause".

When the ideal of Dravidian nationalism was projected in the 1940s, Periyar's religious philosophy also underwent a modification to assert that Hinduism was not the religion of the Dravidians. There was no Dravidian Veda and the Aryan Vedas prevalent among Dravidians were said to be the sacred books which prescribed how Dravidians should be treated but put a bar on Dravidians from acquiring a knowledge of these texts. In his Presidential Address at the Justice Confederation in 1940 EVR said:

"We have to bring about certain reforms in our religion. Many of our countrymen think that they are Hindus. When you call yourself a Hindu you admit Aryan principles. The words Hindu and Hinduism were not used by our forefathers in any of their works. Historians of world religions say that the sacred books of the Hindus are the Vedas, the Upanishads, the Agamas, the Puranas and the Itihasas. You will notice that none of the ancient religious works of the Dravidians have been included among those religious books. A careful study of the Vedas, etc., proves beyond doubt that they were written with a view to disgrace, enslave and exploit the Dravidians. It is this Hinduism which says that we are Sudras and Rakshasas. Again it is this Hinduism which is responsible for the introduction of caste distinction and growth of feud among the sons of the soil. All our superstitions and meaningless and absurd rituals and ceremonies are the result of following the tenets of Hinduism. In addition to our social subjugation and enslavement it paved the way for our political enslavement also by Aryans. If we think calmly we shall see that it is as necessary to be free from Hinduism in the field of religion as it is to be separated from Aryavarta in the field of politics."

Periyar, even while upholding rationalism, executed his duties of a `dharmakartha' of a temple at Erode.

== Islam ==
Ramasamy said "Bane of Tamils is Brahmins, Muslims and Christians consider themselves to Tamilans". In his book "Vedangalin Vandavalangal", he had separate chapters where he criticized Quran and Bible. However, Periyar also praised Islam and the prophet Muhammad. At the rally in Tiruchi, Periyar said:

"Muslims are following the ancient philosophies of the Dravidians. The Arabic word for Dravidian religion is Islam. When Brahmanism was imposed in this country, it was Muhammad Nabi who opposed it, by instilling the Dravidian religion's policies as Islam in the minds of the people"

For eradicating the evil of 'shudrahood', the threat of conversion was occasionally exercised. The Dravidian movement repeatedly complained about the imposition of Aryan religion on Dravidians. 'He clarified that the idea was not to place the Dravidian people under the authority of Muslim religious leaders abroad but to practice the tenets of equality, righteous conduct and mutual respect. He emphasized that he was not an advocate of Islam but was only trying to find a remedy to the sufferings under Aryan, brahminical system and to find a rightful place for Dravidians in the independent country.

== Buddhism ==
Periyar found in Buddhism a basis for his philosophy though he did not accept that religion as self-respect movement. The search for basis began in the course of the movement and was intensified soon after independence. It was again an experiment in the search for self-respect and the object was to get liberation from the shudrahood of Hinduism. A conference to propagate Buddhism was convened in Erode on 31 January 1954. Later that year, he and his wife [He married Maniammai when he was 74 years old] went to Burma to attend the celebration of the 2500th anniversary of Buddha.

Periyar stated that what he was propagating could be found in the teachings of Buddha given 2000 years ago and wanted to revive them as the independent government had accepted the wheel of the Buddha and Hindus have regarded Buddha as an avatar. Brahmins were accused of covering Buddha within the Aryan religion as they had been hiding Tiruvalluvar within the Aryan fold. EVR pointed out that Buddha also laid stress on rationalism, on intellect as the precept, and on thought process for accepting anything. The persecution of Buddha by Brahmins, the burning of Buddhist institutions and teachings and the 'export' of Buddhism to China, Japan and Ceylon were recalled at the conference and Periyar observed that Buddha Vihars at Srirangam, Kanchi, Palani and Tirupati were converted as Hindu temples.

== Christianity ==
Periyar said "Bane of Tamils is Brahmins, Muslims and Christians consider themselves to Tamilans". In his book "Vedangalin Vandavalangal", he had separate chapters where he criticized Quran and Bible.

He was against evangelical movement of DGS Dinakaran and fought with him on this issue. In Periyar's publication, Naathigan, he used to vehemently oppose and criticize Dinakaran calling him fraud.

Christianity was viewed by Periyar similar to monotheistic faith of Islam. He stated that, "So far as god is concerned we find the Christians and Muslims, somewhat reformed from the olden days of barbarians. They say that there can be only one God. They say that it is beyond human comprehension. They say that God does good to those who are good and punishes those who are bad. They say that God has no name or shape. They talk of good qualities". He took an interest in Rev. Martin Luther, where both he and his followers wanted to liken him and his role to that of the European reformer.

== Judaism ==
Periyar believed that south Indians, especially Tamils, were a separate race and the Brahmins who came from the north were intruders and possibly Jews.

In a rally organised on 29 December 1938 (during the Anti-Hindi agitation of 1937—40) an address from Periyar was read out that he had sent from jail. In it he called the Brahmins 'mosquitos', 'bugs' and 'Jews', and said that the abolition of the reign of priests was more urgent than the abolition of zamindari.

In an article published in his magazine Kudi Arasu on 20 March 1938, he had written:

"The Jews are only interested in themselves, and nobody else. They somehow contrive to have the rulers in their pocket, participate in governance and conspire to torture and suck the lives out of other citizens in order that they live (in comfort). Are they not comparable to the Brahmins who too have no responsibility but have the rulers in their pocket, have entered the ruling dispensation and been lording over (all of us)?"
