= Edward J. Nankivell =

British journalist and philatelist

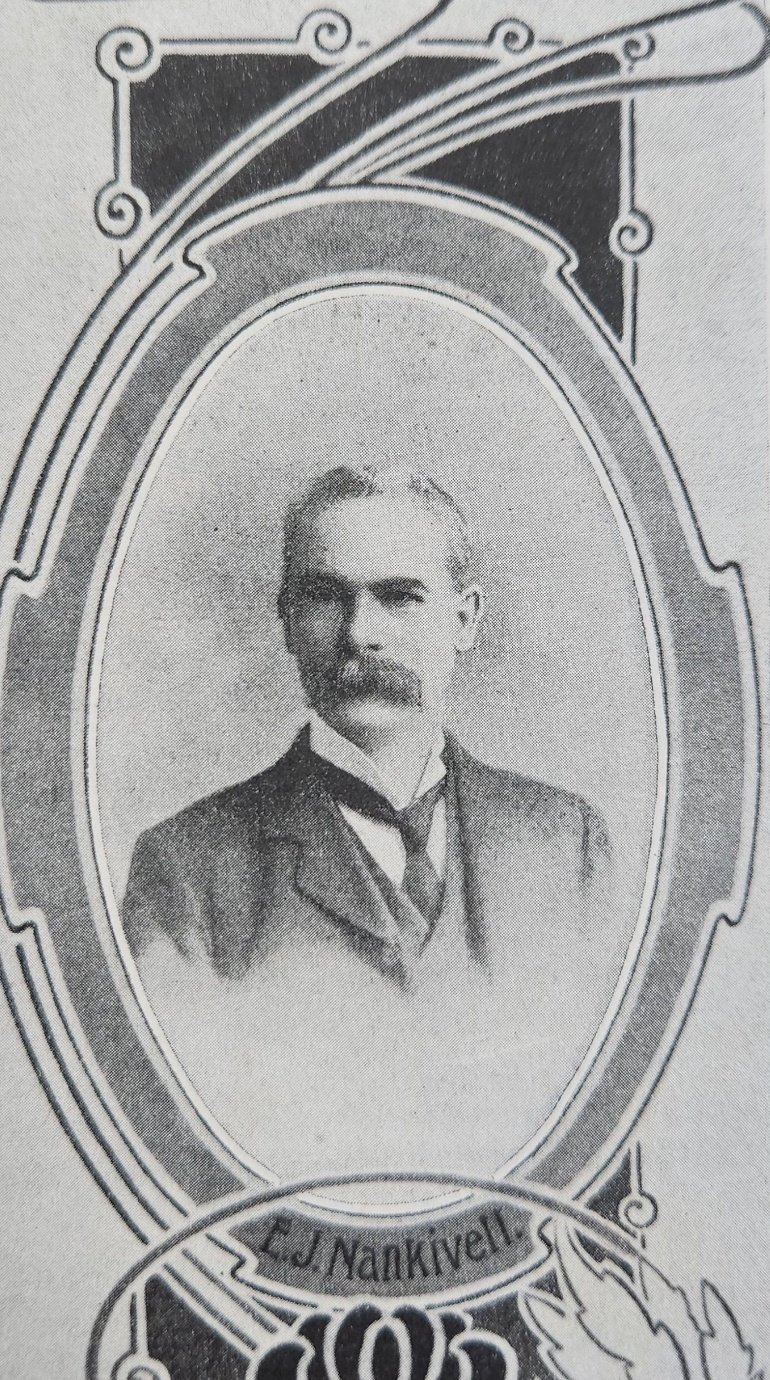
Edward J. Nankivell, 1903

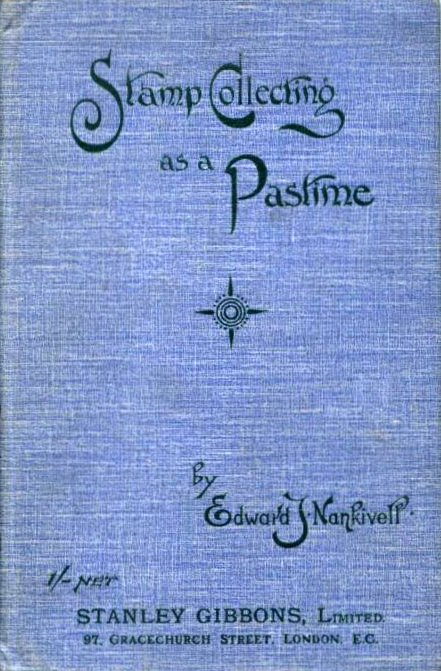
The cover of Nankivell's Stamp Collecting as a Pastime, 1902.

Edward James Nankivell (1848–18 March 1909) was a respected member of the Institute of Journalists in London and an avid early stamp collector. Stamp collecting was a relatively new hobby (the first postage stamp in the world, the Penny Black, was issued by Britain in 1840) and not taken seriously at all by the people, who considered it only something to amuse children.

Nankivell was upset by the lack of respect the public had for his beloved hobby and he wrote Stamp Collecting as a Pastime as a passionate plea for the acceptance of stamp collecting as a serious pastime for everyone from the Prince of Wales to ordinary school children.

The book has become a classic and is available as a free download from the Gutenberg Project and a paper copy of the book is currently available as a reprint.

Nankivell was the editor of The Philatelic Record and Stamp News.

== Publications ==
- Stamp Collecting as a Pastime by Edward J. Nankivell (1902) ISBN 978-0-9786536-1-3 [Reprint]. Also as: Edward J. Nankivell, Stamp Collecting as a Pastime Stanley Gibbons Philatelic Handbooks (1902); reprinted, Dodo Press (2007). Online at Project Gutenberg.
