= Audhild Gregoriusdotter Rotevatn =

Norwegian journalist

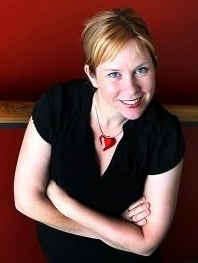
- Rotevatn in 2010
- Born: Audhild Rotevatn; 9 May 1975 (age 51); Norway
- Education: Volda University College, University of Oslo
- Occupations: journalist, news director, communications advisor
- Notable credit(s): Dagsrevyen, news presenter Sportsrevyen, anchor
- Spouse: Tormod Utne

Audhild Gregoriusdotter Rotevatn (born 9 May 1975) is a Norwegian journalist, television host, and radio presenter, who has worked for the Norwegian Broadcasting Corporation and the now defunct Kanal 24. She is known for her unusual name and consistent use of Nynorsk. She is CEO of Viti museums in Aalesund, Norway.

== Career ==
Rotevatn started her journalistic career as an intern in Sunnmørsposten, followed by a short spell in Bergens Tidende. Having finished radio journalism studies at Volda University College, she began working for the Norwegian Broadcasting Corporation in 1999. Rotevatn was a news presenter in Dagsnytt and a sports anchor on NRK1. She moved to Kanal 24 in 2003, initially working as a news anchor. She eventually became news director. Following the ownership change in Kanal 24, Rotevatn left the radio channel and joined I&M Kommunikasjon, an advertising company, as a communications advisor. Rotevatn is also a regular columnist for Dag og Tid, Vårt Land, and Språknytt.

In 2009, the Arts Council Norway offered Rotevatn a position in the committee that evaluates newspapers for press support. Rotevatn was a member of the board of Dag og Tid at the time. After informing the Arts Council about the possible conflict of interest, she resigned from the Dag og Tid board, and accepted the committee position. Dag og Tid received a major increase in subsidy, and Rotevatn was criticized by Christian newspaper Norge IDAG, who lost press support after being assessed by the committee. The Arts Council maintained that there had been no conflict of interest since Rotevatn left the board of Dag og Tid before joining the committee.

In 2010 she became a board member of the Norwegian Broadcasting Corporation.

== Nynorsk advocacy ==
As a journalist and presenter, Rotevatn is known for her consistent use of Nynorsk, for which she received Kringkastingsprisen in 2004. She considers Nynorsk an essential part of the future of the Norwegian language, and frequently participates in the Norwegian language debate. "One should take the language conflict seriously ... many feel discriminated because they are not allowed to write in their own language", she remarked in an interview. During her studies at the University of Oslo, she was required to write her undergraduate thesis in political science in Bokmål, but wrote it in Nynorsk anyway. Rotevatn has criticized the Oslo newspapers, particularly Aftenposten, for not using Nynorsk. "They should be more conscious of their power and their responsibility," she said. Rotevatn received "Alf Helleviks mediemålpris", awarded by Det Norske Samlaget, in 2005.

== Personal life ==
Rotevatn is well known for her unusual name. She was the first member of her family not to be christened "Gregoriusdotter", but added the middle name later to uphold the tradition. In 2001, the word "huglaug" (fan club) was acknowledged as a neologism by the Norwegian Language Council. The word was coined by "Audhild Gregoriusdotter Rotevatn sitt huglaug", Rotevatn's fan club. "It's great that neologisms can come from Nynorsk. Maybe huglaug could mark the beginning of a small revolution", Rotevatn remarked.

Rotevatn is married to Tormod Utne, news director of Sunnmørsposten, and former director-in-chief of Nettavisen. They have three children.
