= Richard Nancekivell =

Cornish rugby union player

Richard Nancekivell was a Cornish rugby union player who competed in the Cornwall County team. He is remembered as the man who scored the winning tries in the 1991 County Rugby championships at Twickenham when Cornwall narrowly beat Yorkshire.

Nancekivell started his rugby career with Launceston (The Cornish All Blacks) along with his two brothers Roly and Eddie.

== See also ==
- Rugby union in Cornwall
