= Pires (disambiguation) =

Pires is a Portuguese surname.

Pires may also refer to:

- Autódromo Fernanda Pires da Silva, race course in Estoril, Portugal
- Music from Van-Pires, John Entwistle's last studio solo album
- Pires (Monção), a village in Monção, Portugal
- Pires do Rio Microregion, a region of south-central Goiás state, Brazil
- Pires do Rio, municipality in Goiás state, Brazil
- Ribeirão Pires, a municipality in the state of São Paulo, Brazil
- Pires (Portuguese footballer) (born 1931), Portuguese football defender
- Pires (Brazilian footballer) (born 1956), Brazilian football defensive midfielder
- Pires SC, a sports club in Duhok, Iraq
