= Periyar and women's rights =

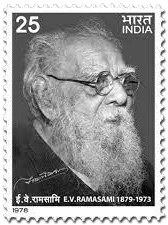
E V Ramasami

Periyar E. V. Ramasamy (17 September 1879 – 24 December 1973), also known as Ramaswami, EVR, Thanthai Periyar, or Periyar, was a Dravidian social reformer and politician from India, who founded the Self-Respect Movement and Dravidar Kazhagam. He advocated for the rights of women and was considered ahead of his time as well as controversial. Throughout the Indian sub-continent today, women continue to be marginalized in various ethnic and religious groups. During the early part of the twentieth century there have been a number of agitations against British rule (external) and injustices committed amongst the people of the sub-continent (internal). With all this, women's rights have been left in the dark. Periyar stated that, "political reformers are agitating that the privilege of administering "India" should go to "Indians". Social reformers are agitating that communal divisions and differences should be done away with. But nobody takes notice of the great hardship suffered by one section of women. Intelligent people will agree that the creator has not endowed men and women with different faculties. There are, in both men and women, intellectuals, courageous people, as well as stupid and cowardly people. While this is the case, it is unfair and wicked on the part of the haughty male population to continue to denigrate and enslave the female population.

Periyar has explained that it is extremely cruel on the part of the Hindu brothers to witness the gradual destruction suffered by one half of their society, without taking any action. This apart, men and women are both human beings. The difference in physical features will not change the human quality. The difference in intellect and physical strength which we find among men can be found among women also. Practice improves the position equally in both men and women. Just as there are foolish people, weaklings and people with bad qualities among men, among women also there are likely to be people belonging to these categories.

== Marriages ==
With regards to marriage, Periyar has stated that it is one of the worst customs in India. He claimed that the marriage principle, briefly, involves the enslavement of a woman by her husband and nothing else. This enslavement is concealed under the cover of marriage rites to deceive the women concerned by giving the wedding the false name of a divine function.

There have been a number of papers in South India reporting how husbands have killed their wives, suspecting immoral behavior. The husband's suspicion of his wife's character has often led to murders. Those who believe in the divine dispensation, according to Periyar, do not have the knowledge to ask themselves why marriages conducted according to religious rites and the approval of God end in this fashion.

Periyar further states that the very idea that the only proper thing for women to do is to be slaves of domesticity, bear children and bring them up, is a faulty one. As long as these restrictions are imposed on women, we can be sure that women have to be subservient to men and depend on men for help. If women have to live on terms of equality with men, they must have the liberty, like men, to have the kind of education they like and also to do unhampered, any work suitable to their knowledge, ability and taste.

Furthermore, Periyar objected to terms like "giving of a maid" and "given in marriage". They are, "Sanskrit terms" and treat woman as a thing. He advocated the substitution of the word for marriage taken from the Tirukkual "Valkai thunai" or "life partner".

=== Expenses ===
With marriage comes the expenses. Periyar stated that in our country, and particularly in Hindu society, a marriage is a function causing a lot of difficulties and waste to all people concerned. But those who conduct the marriage function and those who are getting married do not appear to notice the attendant difficulties because they think that social life necessitates wasteful expense and multiple difficulties and therefore they must necessarily face those inconveniences and hardships.

Wedding feast, jewels, expensive clothes, procession, pandal, dance, music—money is spent on all these to satisfy the vanity of the organizers. Whatever may be the amount of money spent on the wedding and however pompous each of the items may be, the mirth and jollity associated with these are over in two or three days. In a week's time the prestige and honor connected with these are forgotten. But the wedding expenses leave multiple families crushed; for a number of poor families these expenses leave an enormous burden and the debts remain uncleared for a number of years.

However, if the money intended for the wedding expense is not borrowed and belongs to either of the marriage parties, then that amount could be used by her to bring up her children and to educate them. Such a procedure would be highly beneficial to her.

=== Arranged marriages ===
In South Asia we mostly hear of arranged marriages as part of custom, heritage, and religions. Periyar thought that the Aryan wedding methods were barbarous because of the Aryan religion and art: Vedas, Sastras, Puranas, and Epics belong to the barbaric age. He further stated that is the reason why their wedding methods involve the parents giving the girl, prostituting the girl children and some stranger carrying the girl away by force or stealth.

Arranged marriages in general were meant to enable the couple to live together throughout life and derive happiness, satisfaction and a good reputation, even years after the sexual urge and sexual pleasure are forgotten.

But, with the selfish manipulation of this pact, Periyar claimed that women find 'pleasure' in slavish marriage because they have been brought up by their parents without education, independence and self-respect and because they have been made to believe that marriage means subordination to males. The inclusion of such slavish women in the group of 'chaste' women is another lure to them, leading them to find pleasure in such marriages.

Because a man is also married before he has understood the nature of life, its problems and its pleasures, he is satisfied with the slavish nature of the wife and the sexual pleasure she gives. If he finds any incompatibility, he adapts himself to his partner and the circumstances and puts up with his lot.

=== Love marriages or Gandharva marriages ===
Gandharva marriage is when two people fall in love at first sight culminating in a physical union. Gandharva marriages, claims Periyar, will suit only those who have no ideals in life. Such a wedding gives primacy to sexual union along and it is doubtful if it indicates an agreement between the couple for good life. Sexual compatibility alone does not ensure happy married life; the couple should be able to live together cheerfully. Suitability for life or living together can be determined only if the man and woman get used to the company of each other, and are satisfied with each other. Only then, they can enter into an agreement to live together.

Periyar further states that Gandharva marriages can give pleasure only as long as there is lust and the ability to satisfy that lust. If there is no compatibility between the partners in other respects, such marriages end only in the enslavement of women. The lies of such women resemble the lives of bullocks which are tied to a cart, beaten up and made to labor endlessly until they die.

Therefore, there is a proverb stating, "A deeply loving girl is unfit for family life; a suitable life partner is unfit for love." Periyar believed that the agreement between partners to live together will constitute a better marriage than a love marriage.

=== Self-respect marriages ===
In a leading article of Viduthalai, Periyar states that a self-respect wedding is based on rationalism. Rationalism is based on the individual's courage. Some may have the courage to conduct it during the time which almanacs indicate as the time of the planet Rahu and that, particularly in the evening. Some others may have just enough daring to avoid the Brahmin priest and his mother tongue - the Sanskrit language. Some may feel nervous about not keeping the traditional lamp burning in broad daylight. Some others may have the rotten thought that conducting a wedding without 'mangala sutra' is disgraceful.

Still, the self-respect weddings conducted during the past thirty years have some basic limits. They are: Brahmins and their mantras should be utterly avoided; meaningless rituals, piling mud pots, one on another, having the traditional lamp during day time, ritual smoke - all these should be avoided. Rationalism does not approve of these. Periyar then asks why can't the government pass an Act that legalizes weddings which avoid the above-mentioned superstitious practices. If all these details cannot be accommodated in the Act, the latter can legalize weddings which don't have Brahmin priests, the Sanskrit language and the so called holy fire.

Thus, marriages styled as Self-Respect marriages carried a threefold significance: a) replacing the Purohit, b) inter-caste equality, c) man-woman equality. Periyar claimed to have performed Self-Respect marriages unofficially since 1925 and officially since 1928. Self-Respect marriages were legalized in 1967 by the Dravida Munnetra Kazhagam (DMK) Government.

=== Widow-remarriage ===
On the remarriage of widows, Periyar states that among the atrocities perpetrated by the Hindu male population against women, here we have to consider the treatment meted out to widows alone. If a girl loses her husband, even before knowing anything of worldly pleasures, she is compelled to close her eyes to everything in the world and die broken-hearted. Even in Periyar's community at the time, there were widowed girls below the age of 13 years. Periyar stated how it is a touching sight to see the parents of those widowed children treating them like untouchables.

He goes on to say that whatever may be the reason for the present state of the Hindu society, my firm belief that the low position given permanently to widows may prove to be the reason for the utter ruin of the Hindu religion and the Hindu society.

If we try to find the reason for such conduct, we will have to conclude that they instinctively feel that women are slaves, subservient to men and that they must be kept under control. That is why these people treat women like animals. They seem to feel that giving freedom to women is equivalent to committing a serious crime. The result of this attitude is that there is no independence or freedom to one half of the human race. This wicked enslavement of half of the human race is due to the fact that men are physically a little stronger than women. This principle applies to all spheres of life and the weaker are enslaved by the stronger.

If slavery has to be abolished in society, the male arrogance and wickedness which lead to the enslavement of women must be abolished first. Only when this is achieved, the tender sprouts of freedom and equality will register growth.

One of the reasons why Periyar hated Hinduism and the orthodoxy practiced in the name of Hinduism was the practice of child marriage. A number of the girl children who were married before they were ten or twelve years old became widows before they knew the meaning of the word. According to the 1921 All India Census the details of the child widows reported living in the country that time were as follows:

- 1 year baby widows - 497
- 1 to 2 year child widows - 494
- 2 to 3 year child widows - 1,257
- 3 to 4 year child widows - 2,837
- 4 to 5 year child widows - 6,707
- Total number of widows - 11,342
- 5 to 10 year young widows - 85,037
- 10 to 15 year young widows - 232,147
- 15 to 20 year young widows - 396,172
- 20 to 25 year young widows - 742,820
- 25 to 30 year young widows - 1,163,720
- Total number of widows - 2,631,238

Periyar was deeply disturbed when he realized that among the widows in India, 11,892 were little children below 5 years and that young widows below 15 years numbering 232,147 were denied the pleasures of life.

With regards to the re-marriage of widows, Periyar stated that it is the practice of our people to refer to such a wedding as "a widow's marriage". Such an expression is used only with reference to women and in connection with men. Just as this lady is marrying another husband after the death of the first husband, some men marry again after the death of the first wife. But the second marriage of a man is not referred to as "a widower's marriage", though that is the proper thing to do.

Periyar himself was a widower. After becoming one, he took a second wife. He claimed that in the ancient days, both men and women in the country had this practice. There were multiple instances in sastras and puranas of women getting married again after the death of their first husband. Periyar further stated that this is not an unusual practice in the rest of the world though it might appear strange for us at the present time. Christian and Muslim women marry again after the death of the first husband. 90 percent of women in Muslim countries get married again soon after the death of the first husband. This may be unusual in certain sections of Indian societies. But it is a common practice in certain other sections of our society which are called backward communities.

Further, inter-caste marriages and remarriage of widows are on the increase in India. Brahmins oppose these because they are afraid that they cannot exploit the people any more in the name of sastras. For the same reason they oppose the Sharada Act which is necessary for social well-being.

=== Child marriage ===
In all the meetings of the non-Brahmins and the Self-Respectors, Periyar condemned child marriages and emphasized the need for educating all girl children and giving right to young widows to get married again.

Periyar has been against child marriage and stated that it reflects the cruelty to which innocent girls were subjected by their well-meaning parents. Periyar asked that if these parents can be considered civilized in any sense of the term. There was no other leader other than Periyar who reacted against this practice of child marriage.

Those who supported child marriage were strongly against Periyar's condemnation of this act. Take for example, the Sharada Act. Those who opposed this Act say that it was against the Sastras to conduct the marriage of a girl after she has attained puberty. They further say that those who conduct such marriages are committing a sin and therefore will go to hell.

== Chastity ==
Periyar claimed that "household duties" have risen out of the foolishness of people and were not natural duties. He went on to say that it was our selfish greed which has multiplied our household work. Nobody need worry that without household work, the women will lose their "chastity". On chastity, Periyar went on to say that it is something that belongs to women and is not a pledge to men. Whatever, chastity is, it was something that belonged to individuals.

In society, it was believed that if people lose their chastity, they will get divine punishment. Others are not going to get that punishment. Referring to the doctrines of institutionalized orthodox religions, he went on to say that men need not to worry themselves that women are committing a sin by not doing household work. Thus, let men realize that women are not slaves and that men are not their masters or guardians. Women should be allowed to develop the competence to protect themselves and their chastity and men need not be their watchdogs. He also believed that it was derogatory for men to play such a role.

It was said by the orthodox that women will develop diseases if they lose their chastity. The disease that a woman gets affects the husbands also. If we educate the women, they will develop the capability to keep themselves and their husbands pure. Thus, Periyar stated in the Kudi Arasu for the society to think deeply about taking a decision and do the right thing for their sisters and girl children.

Periyar kindled the thoughts of everybody by also ridiculing the use of the word chastity only with reference to women. (Periyar-Father of Tamil 32) He stated that character is essential for both men and women and that speaking of chastity only with reference to women degraded not merely women but men also. He extended this thought and said that in any sphere of activity, civilized society cannot think of one law for men and another for women. He also said that the way most men treated their women was far worse than the way the upper class people treated the lower class, the way in which rich men treated the poor and the way in which a master treated his slave.

== Education ==
On education, Periyar stated that some parents believe that if girls get educated, they will correspond with their secret lovers. That it is a foolish and mischievous notion. If a girl writes a letter, it will only be to a male. We can even now caution men not to read any love letter addressed to them by a woman and, even if they read it, not to reply to it. If men do not listen to this advice, they, as well as the girls who write them must be punished. It will be a hopelessly bad thing, if parents keep their girl children uneducated for this reason.

At a speeched delivered by Periyar at the Prize Distribution function in the Municipal School for Girls at Karungal Palayam, Erode, he stated that girl children should be taught active and energetic exercises like running, high jump, long jump, and wrestling so that they may acquire the strength and courage of men. Their time and energy should not be wasted in light pastimes like Kummi (groups going in a circle, clapping their hands rhythmically) and in Kolatam (striking with sticks rhythmically).

In ancient Tamil literature, poets have stressed the value of education for women. In a famous verse, a poet by the name of Naladiar stated that, "What gives beauty to a woman is not the hair style or the patter of her dress or the saffron on her face but only education". In a verse of Eladhi it states, "Beauty does not lie in the style of wailing or in the charm of a blush but only in the combination of numbers and letters (education)."

In a 1960 issue of Viduthalai Periyar stated that "There should be a drastic revolution in the desires and ideals of Indian women. They should equip themselves to do all types of work that men are doing. They should have good domestic life without allowing nature's obstacles in their own lives. Therefore, there should be a welcome change in the minds of our women. The administrators also most pay special attention to the advancement of women".

== Armed forces ==
Periyar advocated for women to be given weapons to protect themselves in reply to a question put in the Central Legislature. He stated that we have no hope that the state governments will do anything in this sphere because most of the state ministers hold the orthodox belief that women are slavish creatures. Though here and there we find women also as ministers, they are old-fashioned traditionalists who will say, "We don't want any kind of freedom. We are perfectly happy with slavery".

In Periyar's time he explained that ""Indian" women had no self-determination in any sphere of life like education property and marriage. They thought that modern civilization meant dressing themselves like British and American women and adorning themselves. Even our educated women do not entertain any thought that they must enter the police and army departments and learn to pilot airplanes like the women of Russia and Turkey. Just as modern education has made men cowards an book-worms, it has made our women decoratie [sic] dolls and weaklings".

In a leading article written by Periyar in Viduthalai in 1946, he claimed that unless there is a drastic, fundamental and revolutionary change in our administrative machinery, it is impossible to make our women independent beings.

Periyar goes on to explain that in our country also, there are thousands of women with the courage, competence and desire to work in the police department. Just as girls going to school was considered wonderful and cycle-riding by girls was considered funny, a few years ago, women on police duty may appear to be wonderful or strange for a few years. Then, in course of time, this will be considered natural.

We need methods that will effect an astounding revolution in the world of women. Until we acquire those methods, we will be moving forward like a tortoise and writing and talking about Drowpath and Sita.

Periyar, in a 1932 article of Kudi Arasu, explained that "women should develop physical strength like men. They must take exercise and get training in the use of weapons. They must acquire the ability to protect themselves when any sex-mad person tries to molest them. They should get the necessary training to join the armey [sic] when need arises and fight the enemy. This is the view of all civilized people. Women also wholeheartedly support this view. When the general view in the world is like this, who can accept the statement of some people that there is no use in giving higher education to women?"

== Birth control ==
- "Others advocate birth-control, with a view of preserving the health of women and conserving family property; but we advocate it for the liberation of women."

In the Kudi Arasu of 1932, Periyar explained the basic differences between the reasons given to us for contraception and the reasons given by others for this. We say that contraception is necessary for women to gain freedom. Others advocate contraception taking into consideration multiple problems like the health of women, the health and energy of the children, the poverty of the country and the maintenance of the family property. A number of Westerners also support contraception for the same reasons. Our view is not based on these considerations. We recommend that women should stop delivering children altogether because conception stands in the way of women enjoying personal freedom. Further, begetting a number of children prevents men also from being free and independent. This truth will be clear if we listen to talk of men and women when their freedom is hampered.

He went on to say how birth control does not aim at preventing the birth of children altogether, but aims only at limiting births. A man and his wife may have two children, or at the most, three children. This birth control policy is against bringing forth an unlimited number of children.

While Periyar and the Self-Respect movement were advocating for birth control, Rajaji (C. Rajagopalachariar) strongly opposed it. Others who opposed birth control was Thiru Adhithanar, the publisher of an extremely popular newspaper, Dina Thandhi at the time. In response to Rajaji's stand against birth control, Periyar explained that he was against this since he was of the Vedic Brahmin community that staunchly engrossed in the Manu Dharma. Thus, limiting births of overpopulation would limit diseases and death from a number of people and therefore leave Brahmin priests without a job of doing ceremonies for the sick and funerals. In a 1959 article of Viduthalai he exclaimed that "If people like Rajaji discover new islands, make the forests habitable, do propaganda for the birth of more and more children and have farms for the upbringing of children, we may be in a position to understand them."

During the late 1950s, 80 percent of the men and 90 percent of the women in Tamil Nadu were illiterate. Periyar argued in a 1959 article in Viduthalai that "in this situation, if birth control is not practiced and people are allowed to have any number of children, the result will be the multiplication of castes among the "Sudras", like washermen, barbers, pot-makers, kuravas or gypsies, hunters, fishermen, famers [sic], toddy tappers, padayachies, pillars, cobblers, pariahs, and a thousand others and a limitless increase in population. The increase in population will force the 'Sudras' to preserve themselves from starvation by standing with folded hands before lazy fellows and calling them 'swami', 'master' and 'landlord'. What good result can we expect if birth control is not adopted?"

Previously in a 1933 article of the Kudi Arasu, Periyar, in his words, explained that "even a High Court Judge in India does not know the amount of trouble that a mother takes to bring up a child. If a husband is kind to his wife and shows concern for her health and happiness, he must adopt the contraceptive method. Otherwise, he must be one who could manage to see that in delivery and in the brining [sic] up of children, she does not have much trouble. Therefore, the proper thing to do now is to drastically cut the expenses mentioned above and spend money on the proper upbringing of children with the help of nurses."

== Property rights and divorce ==
With regards to property rights for women, Periyar stated that there was no difference between men and women. He went on to say that like men, women should have the right to own property and enjoy its benefits. With regards to divorce or separations, he advocated that a woman can lie away from her husband if he is an undesirable person and if he has nay virulent disease. When a woman has to live apart from her husband in these circumstances, she is entitled to maintenance allowance and a claim on the husband's property. Even if a widow gets remarried, she must be given the right to claim a share of the first husband's property.

On 4 February 1946, the Central Legislature passed an Act giving the right the Hindu married woman to get from her husband in certain circumstances a separate place to live in and a maintenance allowance. Periyar explained how that it was a useless Act. since it seems that the members of the Hindu Mahasabha and Sanadahnis agitated against the grant of even this right.

== Dowry ==
On the Dowry system practiced widely throughout the Indian sub-continent not only by Hindus but Christians too, Periyar calls it a "serious disease that was spreading fast amongst Tamilians". He went on to state that the disease was also found in its virulent form among the Andhras and the Brahmins of Tamil Nadu. Periyar also argued that if a man with property worth one lakh has three daughters, he has to become a beggar by the time these daughters are married. In the name of dowry, the parents of the young men who marry the three daughters, squeeze the man's property out of him.

In the 1959 issue of Viduthalai, Periyar stated that, "according to a new legislation, women have the right to a share of the parents' property. Therefore every girl will definitely get her legitimate share from the parents' wealth - if the parents are wealth. It is inhuamane [sic] on the part of the parents of a boy to dump on him a girl whom he does not like and to plan to such as much as they can from the property of the girl's father. There is basically no difference between selling education and love for money and selling one's chastity for money. 'Prostitute' is a germ of contempt for a woman; a boy should not be reduced by his avaricous [sic] parents to get the name, 'a prostituted boy' or 'a boy that has been sold'. A father-in-law who has means, however miserly he may be by nature, will not be indifferent when his daughter suffers out of poverty. Therefore, it is very shameful on the part of the bridegroom's parents to demand from the bride's father that at the time of the marriage he should gie jewels worth so many thousands along with so many thousand rupees as dowry and that he should provide the bridegroom with a house and a care. The fact that another party makes such demands at the time of his daughter's marriage does not justify any parent's demands at the time of his son's wedding. All people must realize that both demanding and giving dowry are wrong and they must boldly declare this when occasion arises."

Periyar calls the dowry an evil and exploitative practice depriving tens of thousands of talented and beautiful young women with sound character remaining spinsters without any chance of getting married.

== Devadasis ==
Among the atrocities the Tamil society committed against women was the practice of keeping some women attached to temples as Devadasis. Dr. Muthulakshmi proposed the resolution at the Madras Legislature that the Devadasi system should be abolished. The Government wanted comments on that from all important people. Periyar in his statement pointed out that the Devadasi system was a disgrace to Hindu religion. The fact that, in the name of a temple or a god, some women are kept as common property is an insult to all the women in the society. He also remarked that the prevalence of this system encouraged immorality among men and thus set the pattern for unprincipled life in multiple families. This was stoutly opposed in the Assembly by Satyamurthi Iyer, an orthodox Congress member, under the pretext of safeguarding the Hindu traditions. It should be said to the credit of Dr. Muthulakshmi and the leaders like Periyar that the proposal of the Doctor was accepted and a law was enacted against the Devadasi system.

Periyar's example of the degradation of women in the Devadasi system is explained that "if a man's physical passion is aroused when his wife is not with him, he immediately goes to a prostitute. Rough stones are planted where cows and bufaloes [sic] graze to facilitate the animals to rub against the stones when they feel like it. Likewise, Devadasis served in temples and in all villages rough stones planted on the borders and they say that these two (employing devadasis and the planting rough stones) are aamong [sic] the 32 dharmas mentioned in the sastras. When we consider why his kindness to the suffering and also the 32 dharmas are all bogus".

== Resolutions passed ==
As the Self-Respect conference held in Chengalpattu, Tamil Nadu in 1929, the following were among the multiple resolutions passed with regards for women's rights:

1. Women should be given equal right along with men for the family property.
2. There should be no objection to employing women to any job for which they are qualified.
3. Schools, particularly schools, should try to employ only women teachers.

At the conference held in Erode in 1930, the same resolutions were passed again reminding the delegates and others that the interest of women was still uppermost in Periyar's mind. M.R. Jayakar who presided over the Erode conference was greatly impressed by the progressive views of Periyar and other members. He was particularly happy that the movement included not merely non-Brahmin Hindus but Christians and Muslims too. He pointed out that the Self-Respect movement was more progressive than Congress. Furthermore, at the Virudhnagar conference the women members held a separate conference and passed some resolutions demanding that women should have the right to select their life partners without any consideration of religion or community and that weddings should not involve wasteful expenditure and elaborate ceremonies.
