= Periyar and the eradication of caste =

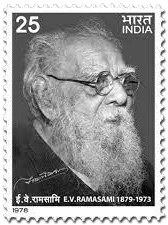
Periyar E. V. Ramasamy

Periyar E. V. Ramasamy (17 September 1879 – 24 December 1973), also known as Ramaswami, EVR, Thanthai Periyar was a Dravidian social reformer and politician from India, who founded the Self-Respect Movement and Dravidar Kazhagam. On the caste system in India, Periyar dealt harshly with the practice of discrimination and its subordination of the different levels it created in society. He attacked those who used the system to take advantage of the masses through exploitation and subjugation.

== Philosophy ==
Periyar felt that a small number of cunning people created caste distinctions in order to dominate over society. That was why he emphasized the view that we must first develop self-respect and learn to analyze propositions rationally. A self-respecting rationalist will readily realize that caste system has been stifling self-respect and therefore he will strive to get rid of this menace. One of Periyar's quotes on caste was, "a sizable population today remains as Untouchables, and another sizable population exists in the name of Sudras and as serfs, coolies and menials. Who wants an independence that cannot help change these things? Who wants religion, scriptures and gods, which cannot bring about a change in this sphere"?

Periyar explained that the caste system in south India is, due to Indo-Aryan influence, linked with the arrival of Brahmins from the north. Ancient Tamil Nadu (part of Tamilakkam) had a different stratification of society in four or five regions (Tinai), determined by natural surroundings and adequate means of living. Periyar also mentions that birds, animals, and worms, which are considered to be devoid of rationalism do not create castes, or differences of high and low in their own species. But man considered to be a rational being, is suffering from these because of religion. He further explains that amongst dogs you do not have a Brahmin dog, or a Pariah (untouchable) dog. Among donkeys and monkeys we also do not find such things. But, amongst men there is such discrimination.

Periyar argued on how a person with an iota of sense or rationalism in could do such things such as giving special treatment only to Brahmins. Some examples practiced were for lower castes to fall at their feet and to even, sometimes, wash their feet and drink that water. Periyar explains that if this is Hindu doctrine and philosophy, such a religion must go. He gives examples of rituals such as christening, house warming, marriage, and for puberty, that they are for the Brahmin's gain as the only ones to conduct these occasions. We do not respect our knowledge nor are we ashamed of our actions. Are we merely a mass of flesh and bones? Why should anybody get angry when I say all these to make you think over. Who is responsible of our degradation? Is it religion or government"?

Gandhi advocated for the caste system in its preservation. On the question of Untouchables being prevented from drawing water from wells and entering temples, Gandhi suggested having separate wells and temples made for them instead. Periyar argued against this by demanding the Vedas of Indo-Aryans to be burnt and their deities to be destroyed since it was their creation of the castes and Untouchables. He also went on to state that "it was absurd to quote religion, god, or religious doctrines to render people as lowest castes".

Periyar argued that the caste system has "perverted peoples ideas about human conduct. The principle of different codes of conduct for each caste based on birth and life, led in accordance with it for centuries, have spoiled the Hindu mentality almost beyond repair, and destroyed the idea of uniformity in conduct. Graded inequality has got so much into the Hindu blood that general intelligence is warped and refused to mend even after English education and higher standards of living".

== Hereditary Education Policy ==
In 1952, Rajaji introduced a new education policy based on family vocation which its opponents dubbed Kula Kalvi Thittam (Hereditary Education Policy). As per this policy, schools will work in the morning and students can help their fathers in their work in the afternoon. Thus, a carpenter’s son would learn carpentry, a priest's son chanting hymns, and a barber’s son would learn hair cutting and shaving after school. Periyar felt that this scheme was a clever device against Dalits and Other Backward Classes as their first generation was getting educated only then.

Periyar demanded its withdrawal and launched protests against the Kula Kalvi Thittam which he felt was caste-based and was aimed at maintaining caste hegemony. Rajaji quit in 1954, and his successor Kamaraj scrapped it after becoming chief minister.

== Removal of caste names ==
Periyar realized that the domination of Brahmins was not restricted to the spheres of administration and worship. It was found that most of the hotels in Tamil Nadu indicated on the name boards that they were maintained by Brahmins and only served Brahmins. Periyar organized agitations throughout Tamil Nadu for the removal of the words "for the brahmins" and "by the Brahmins" from the name boards of hotels. He drew the attention of the common people and particularly the philanthropists to this practice in the chowltries of feeding the Brahmins and non-Brahmins separately. Today this practice is no longer in existence.

== Inter-caste marriages ==
Periyar encouraged inter-caste marriages in order to combat the superstitions of the caste system practiced in India. He pointed out that a marriage is a contract between a young woman and a young man and it is not a function for the parents to get involved in for a reason or another. Generally, orthodox elders arranged the marriages of their children and tried to perpetuate the dowry system. One of the projects of the Self-Respect Movement started by Periyar was to make young people realize that a marriage is the concern of a young man and a young woman and that other considerations brought in by the parents were utterly irrelevant. The Self-Respect Movement also pointed out that there were facilities for registering marriages and that the practice of employing Brahmin priests to conduct the marriages betrayed the superstition of the concerned people and encouraged exploitation by Brahmins. In the course of over the past fifty years, thousands of weddings between people of different communities and without the intervention of Brahmin priests have taken place as a result of the influence that the Self-Respect Movement has exerted on society. Arignar Anna in his capacity as Chief Minister of Tamil Nadu passed a law in 1967 by which marriages conducted without the intervention of priests became lawful marriages.

== Service to the backward classes ==
After entering the Congress in 1919, E.V.Ramasamy(Periyar) realized that the Brahmins had many more government jobs than the non-Brahmins and that higher education was more or less their prerogative. He wanted the Congress to pass a resolution demanding communal representation in education and in employment. Though he tried hard for five years continuously, he could not persuade the Congress party to realize the need for such a resolution. Therefore, he left the Congress, supported the Justice party, started the Self-Respect Movement and finally got the government of Madras to pass a law on communal representation in education and employment.

Kumarasami Kamaraj was thoroughly convinced that Periyar was only demanding justice for the non-Brahmins who had been neglected and exploited by certain sections of the people for hundreds of years. Therefore, he readily accepted Periyar's suggestion that poor people should have free education. When Kamaraj became Chief Minister of Madras he allowed all children to have free education up to standard ten. Through Periyar's spirit of social service, Kamaraj introduced the free mid-day meal scheme for school children and later granted free books and free clothes to school children. When Kalaignar Karunanidhi was Chief Minister in 1969, he extended free education up to the pre-university class. As a result of Periyar's devoted service for the cause of the under privileged, scheduled caste men and women occupy high positions in government offices and also serve as doctors and engineers.
