= Nankivell =

Nankivell and Nancekivell are surnames. Notable people with these surname include:

== Nankivell ==
- Alex Nankivell (born 1996), New Zealand rugby union player
- Bill Nankivell (1923–2024), Australian politician in South Australia
- Edward J. Nankivell (1848–1909), British journalist and stamp collector
- Frank A. Nankivell (1869–1959), Australian artist and political cartoonist
- Gary Nankivell, master optical craftsman from New Zealand; the Nankivell Observatory was named in his honour
- Joice NanKivell Loch (1887–1982), Australian author, journalist and humanitarian worker
- Maisie Nankivell (born 1999), Australian netball player and Australian rules footballer
- Rex Nan Kivell KCMG (1898–1977), New Zealand-born British art collector

== Nancekivell ==
- Kevin Nancekivell (born 1971), English footballer
- Richard Nancekivell, Cornish rugby union player
